= M.I.A. discography =

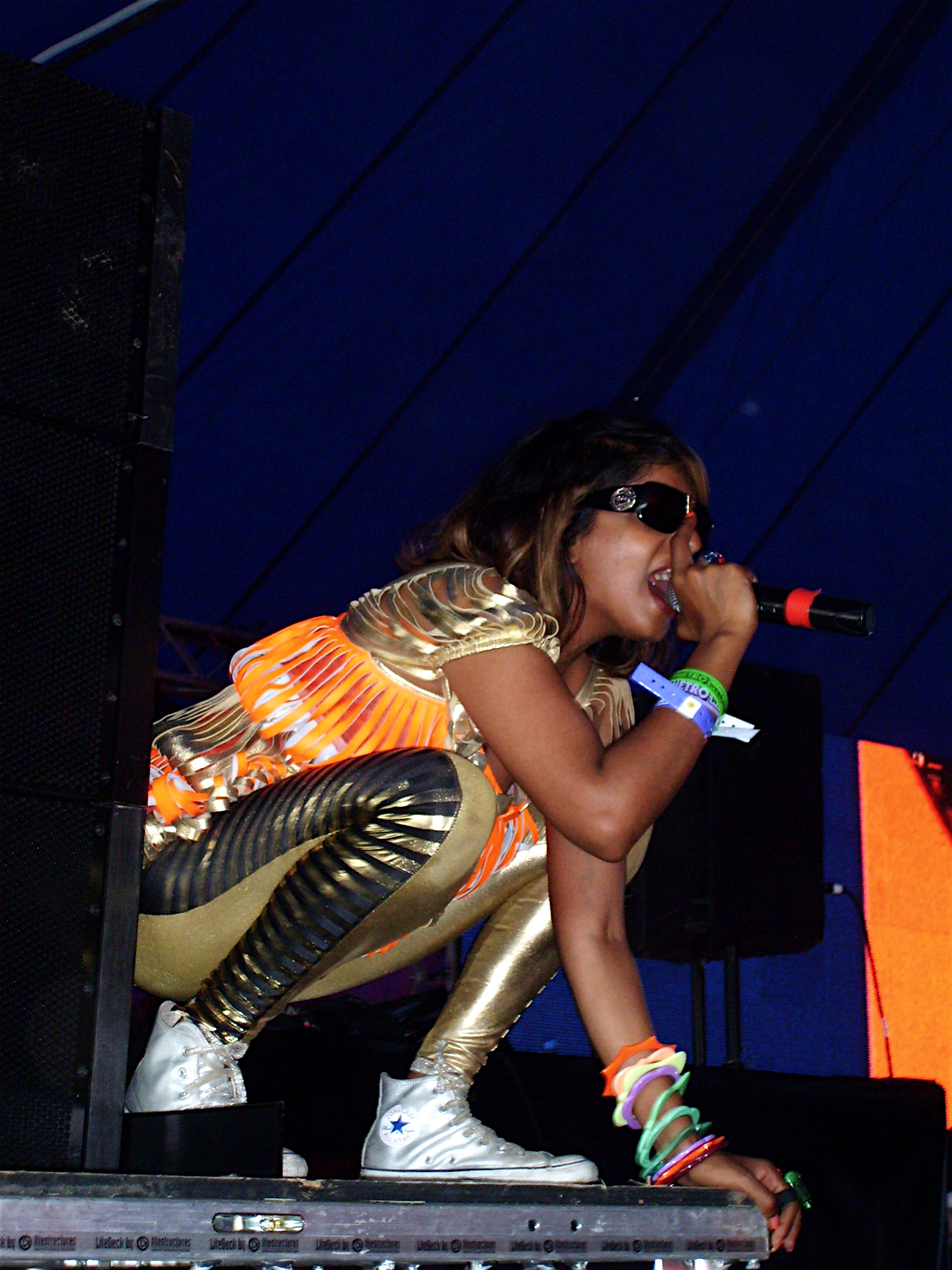
- M.I.A. performing in August 2007
- Studio albums: 7
- Extended plays: 2
- Singles: 45
- Music videos: 34
- Mixtapes: 3

The British rapper and singer M.I.A. has released seven studio albums, two extended plays, three mixtapes, forty-five singles (including nine as a featured artist) and twenty-nine music videos. Born Mathangi "Maya" Arulpragasam, M.I.A. began her career as a visual artist and film-maker, and moved into making music after filming a documentary on the band Elastica in 2001. The band's lead singer, Justine Frischmann, lent her a Roland MC-505 sequencer/drum machine which she used to make a demo tape that secured her a contract with British label XL Recordings.

M.I.A.'s debut studio album, Arular, was initially scheduled to be released in September 2004, but the release was delayed by six months due to problems with the clearance of samples used in the songs. She released two singles and a mixtape in the interim. Although the album had limited commercial success, it was highly regarded by music critics for its blending of genres such as grime, hip hop, ragga and Brazilian baile funk, and for its politicised lyrics. Music magazines in the United States and Europe included it in lists of the best albums of the year, and it was nominated for the Mercury Prize in the United Kingdom.

Her second album, Kala, was released in 2007 along with the single "Boyz" and was also praised by critics, drawing more extensively from African, Tamil and Caribbean music. It proved much more commercially successful than her debut, reaching number 18 on the US Billboard 200 and number 21 on the UK Albums Chart. "Paper Planes", the album's fourth and final single, became M.I.A.'s breakthrough hit and was nominated for Record of the Year at the 51st Annual Grammy Awards. The song appeared on the soundtrack to the 2008 film Slumdog Millionaire along with "O... Saya", a song written specifically for the film by M.I.A. and A. R. Rahman. The song, which appears on the film's soundtrack album, was released on M.I.A.'s own label N.E.E.T. and was nominated for Best Original Song at the 81st Academy Awards.

Her third album, Maya, was released in 2010 and reached the top 10 in numerous countries, remaining her highest-charting album both in the UK and the US. Her fourth album, Matangi, was released in 2013, charting moderately in music markets, despite receiving strong feedback from both public and critics. Her fifth album, AIM, was released on 9 September 2016. In 2020, she was featured along with Young Thug on Travis Scott's single "Franchise", which debuted atop the U.S. Billboard Hot 100, becoming her first Hot 100 number-one single.

== Albums ==
=== Studio albums ===
List of studio albums, with selected chart positions, sales figures and certifications
Title	Album details	Peak chart positions										Sales	Certifications
Title	Album details	UK	AUS	BEL (FL)	CAN	FRA	GER	IRE	NOR	SWE	US	Sales	Certifications
Arular	Released: 22 March 2005; Label: XL; Formats: CD, LP, digital download, streaming	98	145	97	—	—	71	—	20	47	190	Europe: 30,000; US: 129,000	
Kala	Released: 8 August 2007; Label: XL, Interscope; Formats: CD, LP, digital download, streaming	39	46	22	16	117	93	22	22	18	18	US: 559,000	BPI: Gold; MC: Platinum; RIAA: Gold
Maya	Released: 7 July 2010; Label: N.E.E.T., XL, Interscope; Formats: CD, LP, digital download, streaming	21	21	20	7	79	48	47	8	31	9	US: 99,000	
Matangi	Released: 1 November 2013; Label: N.E.E.T., Interscope; Formats: CD, LP, digital download, streaming	64	99	47	—	96	—	—	—	—	23	US: 77,000	
AIM	Released: 9 September 2016; Label: Interscope; Formats: CD, LP, digital download, streaming	63	51	48	41	55	55	—	—	—	66		
Mata	Released: 14 October 2022; Label: Island; Formats: digital download, streaming	—	—	—	—	—	—	—	—	—	—		
M.I.7	Released: 17 April 2026; Label: OHMNIMUSIC; Formats: digital download, streaming	—	—	—	—	—	—	—	—	—	—		
"—" denotes a recording that did not chart or was not released in that territory.

=== Mixtapes ===
Title	Album details
Piracy Funds Terrorism Volume 1	Released: December 2004; Format: CD
Vicki Leekx	Released: 31 December 2010; Format: Digital download
Bells Collection	Released: 25 December 2023; Format: Digital download

== Extended plays ==
Title	Extended play details
Live Session (iTunes Exclusive)	Released: 18 October 2005; Label: XL; Format: Digital download
How Many Votes Fix Mix	Released: 28 October 2008; Label: XL; Formats: 12" vinyl, digital download

== Singles ==
=== As lead artist ===
List of singles as lead artist, with selected chart positions and certifications, showing year released and album name
Title	Year	Peak chart positions										Certifications	Album
Title	Year	UK	AUS	BEL (FL)	CAN	DEN	FRA	GER	IRE	US	US Dance	Certifications	Album
"Galang"	2003	77	—	—	—	—	—	—	—	—	— (Note: "Galang" did not enter the Billboard Dance/Electronic Songs, but peaked at number 11 on the Dance Singles Sales chart.)		Arular
"Sunshowers"	2004	93	—	—	—	—	—	—	—	—	—		Arular
"Hombre"	2005	—	—	—	—	—	—	—	—	—	—		Arular
"Bucky Done Gun"	2005	88	—	—	—	—	—	—	—	—	—		Arular
"Bird Flu"	2006	—	—	—	—	—	—	—	—	—	—		Kala
"Boyz"	2007	—	—	—	—	—	—	—	—	— (Note: "Boyz" did not enter the Billboard Hot 100, but peaked at number 7 on the Hot Singles Sales chart.)	— (Note: "Boyz" did not enter the Billboard Dance/Electronic Songs, but peaked at number 3 on the Dance Singles Sales chart.)		Kala
"Jimmy"	2007	66	153	—	—	—	—	—	—	—	— (Note: "Jimmy" did not enter the Billboard Dance/Electronic Songs, but peaked at number 28 on the Dance Club Songs chart.)		Kala
"Paper Planes"	2008	19	68	18	7	18	91	76	23	4	— (Note: "Paper Planes" did not enter the Billboard Dance/Electronic Songs, but peaked at number one on the Dance Singles Sales chart.)	BPI: 2× Platinum; IFPI DEN: Gold; MC: 7× Platinum; RIAA: 3× Platinum; RMNZ: 5× Platinum	Kala
"Born Free"	2010	156	—	—	—	—	—	—	—	—	—		Maya
"XXXO"	2010	26	74	— (Note: "XXXO" did not enter the Ultratop 50, but peaked at number seven on the Flemish Ultratip chart.)	—	—	—	—	—	—	— (Note: "XXXO" did not enter the Billboard Dance/Electronic Songs, but peaked at number 12 on the Dance/Electronic Digital Songs chart.)		Maya
"Steppin Up"	2010	—	—	—	—	—	—	—	—	—	— (Note: "Steppin Up" did not enter the Billboard Dance/Electronic Songs, but peaked at number 36 on the Dance/Electronic Digital Songs chart.)		Maya
"Teqkilla"	2010	—	—	—	93	—	—	—	—	—	— (Note: "Teqkilla" did not enter the Billboard Dance/Electronic Songs, but peaked at number 11 on the Dance/Electronic Digital Songs chart.)		Maya
"Tell Me Why"	2010	—	—	—	—	—	—	—	—	—	—		Maya
"It Takes a Muscle"	2010	—	—	—	—	—	—	—	—	—	—		Maya
"Internet Connection"	2011	—	—	—	—	—	—	—	—	— (Note: "Internet Connection" did not enter the Billboard Hot 100, but peaked at number 17 on the Hot Singles Sales chart.)	— (Note: "Internet Connection" did not enter the Billboard Dance/Electronic Songs, but peaked at number 7 on the Dance Singles Sales chart.)		Maya
"Bad Girls"	2012	43	81	— (Note: "Bad Girls" did not enter the Ultratop 50, but peaked at number 38 on the Flemish Ultratip chart.)	92	—	61	—	80	— (Note: "Bad Girls" did not enter the Billboard Hot 100, but peaked at number five on the Bubbling Under Hot 100 Singles chart.)	— (Note: "Bad Girls" did not enter the Billboard Dance/Electronic Songs, but peaked at number 10 on the Dance/Electronic Digital Songs chart.)	BPI: Gold; RMNZ: Platinum	Matangi
"Bring the Noize"	2013	—	163	—	—	—	—	—	—	—	—		Matangi
"Come Walk with Me"	2013	—	—	—	—	—	—	—	—	—	39		Matangi
"Y.A.L.A."	2013	—	—	—	—	—	—	—	—	—	19		Matangi
"Double Bubble Trouble"	2014	—	—	— (Note: "Double Bubble Trouble" did not enter the Ultratop 50, but peaked at number 58 on the Flemish Ultratip chart.)	—	—	179	—	—	—	37		Matangi
"Sexodus Re-Loaded With War" (featuring War Syntaire)	2015	—	—	—	—	—	—	—	—	—	—		Non-album single
"Swords"	2015	—	—	—	—	—	188	—	—	—	38		AIM
"Borders"	2015	—	—	—	—	—	73	—	—	—	25		AIM
"POC THAT STILL A RYDA"	2016	—	—	—	—	—	82	—	—	—	—		Non-album single
"Go Off"	2016	—	—	—	98	—	82	—	—	—	25		AIM
"Bird Song"	2016	—	—	—	—	—	—	—	—	—	—		AIM
"Freedun" (featuring Zayn)	2016	—	—	—	—	—	—	—	—	—	—		AIM
"P.O.W.A."	2017	—	—	—	—	—	—	—	—	—	—		Non-album singles
"Up Inna" (with Cadenza and GuiltyBeatz)	2020	—	—	—	—	—	—	—	—	—	—		Non-album singles
"CTRL"	2020	—	—	—	—	—	—	—	—	—	—		Non-album singles
"The One"	2022	—	—	—	—	—	—	—	—	—	29		Mata
"Popular"	2022	—	—	—	—	—	—	—	—	—	—		Mata
"Beep"	2022	—	—	—	—	—	—	—	—	—	—		Mata
"Armour"	2025	—	—	—	—	—	—	—	—	—	—		Non-album singles
"Safe"	2025	—	—	—	—	—	—	—	—	—	—		Non-album singles
"Everything"	2026	—	—	—	—	—	—	—	—	—	—		M.I.7
"—" denotes a recording that did not chart or was not released in that territory.

=== As featured artist ===
List of singles as featured artist, with selected chart positions and certifications, showing year released and album name
Title	Year	Peak chart positions										Certifications	Album
Title	Year	UK	AUS	BEL (FL)	CAN	DEN	FRA	GER	IRE	SWE	US	Certifications	Album
"Swagga Like Us" (Jay-Z and T.I. featuring Kanye West, Lil Wayne and M.I.A.)	2008	33	—	—	19	—	—	—	—	22	5	RIAA: Platinum	Paper Trail
"Sound of Kuduro" (Buraka Som Sistema featuring DJ Znobia, M.I.A., Saborosa and Puto Prata)	2009	—	—	—	—	—	—	—	—	—	—		Black Diamond
"Bang" (Rye Rye featuring M.I.A.)	2009	—	—	—	—	—	—	—	—	—	— (Note: "Bang" did not enter the Billboard Hot 100, but peaked at number 39 on the Hot Singles Sales chart.)		Go! Pop! Bang!
"Sunshine" (Rye Rye featuring M.I.A.)	2010	—	—	—	—	—	—	—	—	—	—		Go! Pop! Bang!
"C.T.F.O." (SebastiAn featuring M.I.A.)	2011	—	—	—	—	—	—	—	—	—	—		Total
"Give Me All Your Luvin'" (Madonna featuring Nicki Minaj and M.I.A.)	2012	37	25	5	1	16	3	8	11	60	10	RIAA: Gold	MDNA
"Temple" (Baauer featuring M.I.A. and G-Dragon)	2016	—	—	—	—	—	—	—	—	—	—		Aa
"Franchise" (Travis Scott featuring Young Thug and M.I.A.)	2020	26	31	— (Note: "Franchise" did not enter the Ultratop 50, but peaked at number 15 on the Flemish Ultratip chart.)	16	—	120	35	23	57	1	BPI: Silver; MC: Gold; RIAA: 2× Platinum; RMNZ: Gold	Non-album single
"Where's the Daddy?" (with Major Lazer)	2024	—	—	—	—	—	—	—	—	—	—		Guns Don't Kill People... Lazers Do (15th Anniversary Edition)
"—" denotes a recording that did not chart or was not released in that territory.

== Other charted songs ==
List of other charted songs, with selected chart positions, showing year released and album name
Title	Year	Peak chart positions				Album
Title	Year	CAN	US	US Dance	US Gospel	Album
"O... Saya" (with A. R. Rahman)	2009	68	93	—	—	Slumdog Millionaire: Music from the Motion Picture
"Space"	2010	— (Note: "Space" did not enter the Canadian Singles Chart, but peaked at number 67 on the Canadian Digital Songs chart.)	—	— (Note: "Space" did not enter the Billboard Dance/Electronic Songs, but peaked at number 9 on the Dance/Electronic Digital Songs chart.)	—	Maya
"Trumpet 1"	2026	—	—	—	18	M.I.7
"Sacred Heart"	2026	—	—	—	17	M.I.7

== Guest appearances ==
List of non-single guest appearances, with other performing artists, showing year released and album name
Title	Year	Album
"Topknot" (Cavemen Remix) (Cornershop featuring Bubbley Kaur and M.I.A.)	2004	"Topknot"
"Goodies" (Richard X Remix) (Ciara featuring M.I.A.)	2005	"Goodies"
"Bad Man" (Missy Elliott featuring Vybz Kartel and M.I.A.)	2005	The Cookbook
"Nookie" (M.I.A. & Jabba Remix) (Jamesy P featuring M.I.A. and Jabba)	2005	"Nookie"
"I Got Grapes" (World Wide Treemix) (Nump featuring M.I.A., apl.de.ap and DJ Qbert)	2007	"I Got Grapes" (World Wide Treemix)
"Get It Up" (Radioclit Mix) (Santogold featuring M.I.A. and Gorilla Zoe)	2007	Top Ranking: A Diplo Dub
"Whachadoin?" (N.A.S.A. featuring Spank Rock, M.I.A., Santogold and Nick Zinner)	2009	The Spirit of Apollo
"Rain Dance" (The Very Best featuring M.I.A.)	2009	Warm Heart of Africa
"Baby Riddim" (Switch Remix) (Major Lazer featuring Prince Zimboo and M.I.A.)	2009	Мишка Presents Keep Watch Vol. X
"Legalize My Medicine" (Nump featuring M.I.A.)	2009	Student ov da Game
"Sound of Siren" (Major Lazer featuring M.I.A. and Busy Signal)	2010	Lazers Never Die
"B-Day Song" (Madonna featuring M.I.A.)	2012	MDNA
"Better Than You" (Rye Rye featuring M.I.A.)	2012	Go! Pop! Bang!
"Rock Off Shake Off" (Rye Rye featuring M.I.A.)	2012	Go! Pop! Bang!
"Reloaded (Let It Go Pt. 2)" (ASAP Ferg featuring M.I.A. and Crystal Caines)	2014	Ferg Forever
"Gold" (with The Partysquad)	2014	The Partysquad Summer Mixtape
"Fine Whine" (ASAP Rocky featuring Future, Joe Fox and M.I.A.)	2015	At. Long. Last. ASAP
"The New International Sound Pt. II" (with GENER8ION)	2015	The New International Sound Pt. II
"Jump In" (Anoushka Shankar featuring M.I.A.)	2016	Land of Gold
"Kites" (N.E.R.D featuring Kendrick Lamar and M.I.A.)	2017	No One Ever Really Dies
"Immigrant" (Belly featuring Meek Mill and M.I.A.)	2018	Immigrant

== Music videos ==
=== As lead artist ===
List of music videos as lead artist, showing year released and directors
Title	Year	Director(s)
"Galang"	2004	Ruben Fleischer
"Sunshowers"	2004	Rajesh Touchriver
"Bucky Done Gun"	2005	Anthony Mandler
"Bird Flu"	2007	M.I.A. and Kalyan Kumar
"Boyz"	2007	M.I.A. and Jason "Jay Will" Williams
"Jimmy"	2007	Nezar Khamal
"Paper Planes"	2008	Bernard Gourley
"Space"	2010	Unknown
"Born Free"	2010	Romain Gavras
"XXXO"	2010	M.I.A.
"Story to Be Told"	2010	Unknown
"Bad Girls"	2012	Romain Gavras
"Bring the Noize"	2013	Ben Newman
"Come Walk with Me"	2013	Unknown
"Y.A.L.A."	2013	Daniel Sannwald
"Double Bubble Trouble"	2014	M.I.A.
"Swords"	2015	M.I.A.
"Warriors"	2015	M.I.A.
"Borders"	2015	M.I.A.
"Go Off"	2016	M.I.A.
"P.O.W.A."	2017	M.I.A.
"Finally"	2017	Vivian Sassen
"Reload"	2018	M.I.A. and Justine Frischmann
"The One"	2022	Unknown
"Popular"	2022	Arnaud Bresson
"Marigold"	2024	Quentin Deronzier
"Armour"	2025	Unknown
"Safe"	2025	Unknown

=== As featured artist ===
List of music videos as featured artist, showing year released and directors
Title	Year	Director(s)
"Sound of Kuduro" (Buraka Som Sistema featuring DJ Znobia, M.I.A., Saborosa and Puto Prata)	2008	João Pedro Moreira and Carlos Afonso
"Bang" (Rye Rye featuring M.I.A.)	2009	M.I.A.
"Sunshine" (Rye Rye featuring M.I.A.)	2010	Jess Holzworth
"Give Me All Your Luvin'" (Madonna featuring Nicki Minaj and M.I.A.)	2012	MegaForce
"The New International Sound Pt. II" (GENER8ION + M.I.A.)	2015	Inigo Westmeier
"Franchise'" (Travis Scott featuring Young Thug and M.I.A.)	2020	Travis Scott and White Trash Tyler
