= Bad Girls (M.I.A. song) =

2012 single by M.I.A.

Single by M.I.A.

from the album Matangi and the mixtape Vicki Leekx
- Released: 31 January 2012
- Recorded: 2010–11
- Studio: Hit Factory Criteria (Miami), Circle House (Miami)
- Genre: Hip hop; pop
- Length: 2:13 (Mixtape version); 3:47 (Album/single version)
- Label: Interscope
- Songwriters: Maya Arulpragasam; Nate Hills; Marcella Araica
- Producer: Danja

M.I.A. singles chronology
"Internet Connection" (2011)	"Bad Girls" (2012)	"Give Me All Your Luvin'" (2012)

Music video
- "Bad Girls" on YouTube

"Bad Girls" is a song by British recording artist M.I.A. from her fourth studio album Matangi (2013). It was released by Interscope Records on 31 January 2012 as the lead single from the album. The song was written by M.I.A., Marcella Araica and Danja, and produced by the latter. It was her first release with Interscope following her departure from XL Recordings in 2011. A shorter version of the song appeared on M.I.A.'s mixtape Vicki Leekx (2010).

The track is a midtempo hip-hop song with Middle Eastern influences and exhibiting elements of worldbeat, dancehall and syncopated drums in its instrumentation. Its lyrics revolve around sexual prowess and female empowerment, while its chorus features the refrain "Live fast die young, bad girls do it well" sung in a haughty rap-sung delivery. The song received positive reviews from contemporary critics, who lauded it as a highlight from the mixtape and commended its hook and lyrics on its final version as containing hallmarks of her previous songs including "Paper Planes" (2007) and "XXXO" (2010). In 2019, Pitchfork ranked "Bad Girls" as the 27th best song of the 2010s.

An accompanying music video for the song was shot in Ouarzazate, Morocco in solidarity with the women to drive movement, premiering on 3 February 2012. Directed by Romain Gavras, the video garnered universal acclaim and accolades. The song charted in Australia, Belgium, Canada, France, Korea, Switzerland, the UK and the US, solely on downloads, and was distributed in physical format on 12 March 2012.

== Background and release ==
"Bad Girls" first appeared on M.I.A.'s self-released mixtape Vicki Leekx (2010), shortly following the release of her third studio album Maya earlier that year. Recording sessions for the song transpired in Miami, Florida; M.I.A worked with Danja, a producer who previously collaborated with recording artists such as Madonna and Nelly Furtado. The artwork for "Bad Girls" was released on 25 January 2012, while photos taken by Bernard Coulter of M.I.A. with cowriters Danja and Marcella, who were listening to the record's main mix in a Jeep, were revealed on the rapper's official website and her Twitter page.

Preceding its release, "Bad Girls" was premiered on audio sharing site SoundCloud on 30 January 2012; the song premiered live on worldwide radio the same day on BBC Radio 1. The single was chosen as Zane Lowe's "Hottest Record in the World" alongside Jack White's "Love Interruption" (2012). Lowe opined that despite her typically "energetic" tracks, the rapper was "finding a new voice on [her] forthcoming album", which perhaps explained "the lack of showing off displayed" on the record. "Bad Girls" became readily available for digital download on the iTunes and Amazon on the following day. The song reached the A-List on BBC Radio 6 rotation, and reached the top of the playlist on Italian radio station Radio DeeJay for the week dated 10 March. The single was released in physical format in the United Kingdom on 12 March 2012.

== Remixes ==
"Bad Girls" contains three remixes: the N.A.R.S Remix featuring rappers Missy Elliott and Azealia Banks; the Switch Remix, which still features Missy Elliott but also features Rye Rye; and the Leo Justi remix.

American rapper Jay-Z uses M.I.A.'s flow from "Bad Girls" for the bridge to his song "Tom Ford".

== Composition ==
M.I.A. "Bad Girls" (2013)
"Bad Girls" was noted for its combination of Middle Eastern sounds and a pop chorus.

"Bad Girls" is a midtempo hip hop song with elements of Middle Eastern and Indian hooks with influences of dancehall and worldbeat music. The song's structure is focused on careening beats, synths inspired by Eastern sounds and syncopated drums and an SOS signal rhythm. Nick Levine of NME commented that the song's chorus was one of those "boffo pop choruses" that M.I.A. could toss off when she wanted to, while commending the chorus as being in the same vein as that of "XXXO", a track from M.I.A.'s third studio album Maya (2010). Rolling Stone thought that "Bad Girls" was the catchiest song the singer had released since "Paper Planes" from Kala (2007). The song's instrumentation consists of background bleeps and blorps mixed down, and the percussion turned up from, but still recalling, the original mixtape version. Because of these, the song exhibits what David Marchese of Spin describes as a "vaguely sinister" rhythm slither.

Lyrically, the song explores themes of sexual empowerment. M.I.A. professes "Live fast, die young, bad girls do it well" and "My chain hits my chest when I'm banging on the radio" in a nonchalant mannered chant. Marchese describes the lyric as "irresistibly sassy", a view shared by Robert Copsey of Digital Spy, who wrote that it was a line M.I.A. pulled off spectacularly. M.I.A. adopts a "nicely haughty" rapping-singing vocalization that bears resemblance to her previous work. The first verse consists of M.I.A. declaring in many references to cars "My chain hits my chest when I’m banging on the dashboard / My chain hits my chest when I’m banging on the radio / Yeah back it, back it, yeah pull up to the bumper game / With a signal, cover me, cause I’m changing lanes / Had a handle on it, my life, but I broke it / When I get to where I’m going, gonna have you saying it." She continues with the line "I had a handle on it / My life, but I broke it" in an emotionally key delivery, a view shared by Will Hermes of Rolling Stone who notes that in an anthem to recklessly empowered car sex, is "surprisingly" melancholy.

== Critical response ==
"Bad Girls" was lauded by music critics. Billboard columnist Jason Lipshutz complimented the song's "hypnotic" hook; synonymous sentiments were echoed by Marchese, who ascertained the hook of "Bad Girls" as an "irresistibly sassy lyric". Jeff Klingman of L Magazine felt that "Bad Girls" was relatively subtle compared to her previous work. Although he enjoyed the "bright and clean" rhythms of the track, Klingman reprimanded its lyrical content. "There's no eye-rolling political agit-prop," he remarked, "but there's nothing taking up its void either. It's about being a bad girl, and driving a car. It acts like 'get down' rhymes with 'you can hang'. It's just sort of filling space." Robert Copsey of Digital Spy wrote that the song served as a "timely reminder" that the musician could make a chart-friendly hit when and if she so chooses. He appreciated its hook as a line "loaded with the kind of sex, drugs and rock 'n' roll fluff that most of today's chart hoggers are spouting" and probably the "last thing we expected to hear from the politically-minded Sri Lankan" adding that it was also a line that few could pull off so spectacularly. Bill Lamb of About.com rated the song three and a half stars (out of five), praising its chorus and composition and writing that "this may be just be the kind of curveball that the artist M.I.A. might want to throw at the moment." Molly Lambert of Pitchfork Media commented that "Bad Girls" shows that the "pop instincts and talents" of M.I.A. "remain as sharp as ever." Priya Elan of the NME praised the song, writing "With his help this is MIA as you've never heard her before, taking her pan-global pop smarts and injecting them with a huge growth hormone... Damn straight, MIA, damn straight."

In his 3.5 out of five star review, Will Hermes of Rolling Stone concluded: "This repolished highlight from M.I.A.'s Vicki Leekx mixtape still rides a slinky, Bollywood-style Danja beat, and the key line flips the emotional script: 'I had a handle on it/My life, but I broke it.' As anthems to recklessly empowered car sex go, surprisingly melancholy." Scott Shetler from PopCrush asserted that the track blended hip-hop with more "exotic" sounds, in this case a "hypnotic" Indian-sounding vibe. Likewise, in his review of the mixtape, Mike Schiller of PopMatters described "Bad Girls" as the most "obvious call back" to the sound that brought M.I.A. her fame. In consumer guide for MSN Music, critic Robert Christgau named "Bad Girls" as one of three highlights from the Vicki Leekx mixtape.

In 2019, Pitchfork ranked the song 27th on their list of the 200 best songs of the 2010s decade.

== Chart performance ==
Without being released as a single, "Bad Girls" debuted at number 62 on the UK Singles Chart, and at number 17 on the UK R&B Chart on 11 February 2012. It climbed to position 43 on the former and peaked at 14 on the latter for the week ending 11 March 2012. Selling on digital downloads, the song opened at number 52 on the South Korea Gaon International Singles Download Chart for the week ending 4 February 2012, and at number 58 overall on the South Korea Gaon International Singles Chart. "Bad Girls" also charted on the US Billboard Bubbling Under Hot 100 chart at number 10 for the week ending 11 February 2012, before peaking at number 5 on this chart. The song debuted at 81 on the Belgium Ultratip Flanders chart in the first week of digital release, before climbing to 38 before physical format distribution. Similarly, it charted on the Canadian Hot 100 at number 92 and the Australian ARIA Singles chart at number 86. On 19 February 2012, the song entered the Swiss Singles Chart at number 61. Within a week on solely downloads, "Bad Girls" charted at number 83 on the French Singles Chart, before climbing to number 61 on the week ending 11 March 2012. "Bad Girls" was voted No. 99 on Triple J Hottest 100 of 2012.

As of 2013, the song has sold 409,000 copies in the United States, according to Nielsen Soundscan.

== Music video ==
=== Background ===
"It was dope to have so many people from so many different backgrounds speaking so many different languages come together to create something that we believed in. I thought I was gonna die on the shoot when I saw the drifting. It was a four-day shoot so everyone was on edge the whole time specifically ME when I had to do bluesteel singing to the camera while the cars did doughnuts on the wet road ten feet away. In my mind I was thinking how I was gonna deliver the video to Vice with no legs."

— M.I.A. describing the shoot for the video to "Bad Girls".

M.I.A. announced via Twitter that she had shot an accompanying music video for the song, directed by Romain Gavras. This is the second time the two have collaborated, following the 2010 video to "Born Free". Two photos from the set of the video were uploaded by the artist onto M.I.A.'s official website in February 2012. The video for "Bad Girls" premiered on Noisey, Vice's new music channel on YouTube, on 2 February 2012 at a total length of four minutes and twelve seconds. Principal photography for the video was done in Ouarzazate, Morocco over a period of four days.

=== Synopsis and production ===
M.I.A. in a still from the music video

The setting of the music video features crumbled architecture, sustained over years of attack; smouldering oil tankers; young men in kaffiyeh, standing around bored; mysterious women covered from head to toe, with only their kohl-lined eyes flashing out. M.I.A. joked to Noisey in a YouTube comment response interview that she shot the video in Morocco because she "didn't want to go to jail!". M.I.A. deadpans to the camera about having sex in cars while vamping in front of those tanker fires. M.I.A. rides atop a drifting car, filing her nails, and in a see through glow-in-the-dark car custom-made for the shoot. Her idea for the vehicle was inspired by the scene of actor Prabhu Deva dancing atop a see-through bus in the song "Urvasi Urvasi" from Kaadhalan (1994). Having initially planned to fund the perspex car's construction in India, M.I.A. and Gavras funded the car's manufacture in Morocco after being told it would take five months to complete. Women are depicted gyrating while wearing designs in cheetah patterns, polka dots and gold. M.I.A. described the design and creation of the video's props, from the clothes designs to the car's upholstery, as an "accumulated process". M.I.A. leads a crowd of women decked in traditional Middle-Eastern garb with a hipster twist, in a modern-day Rebel-Without-A-Cause-esque drag race. It's a dusty evening, where the musician is wearing aviator sunglasses and bling; the women are watched by cheering men as they drive, spin, skid and whoop across the desert plain. Channelling male angst, futility and anger, old family sedans and BMWs are grabbed and turned into drifting, skiing racing stunt rides. A rearing, galloping horse is picturised, being ridden alongside the cars. Critics note this resonates whether on Crenshaw, Eight Mile or a bullet-scarred road running parallel with an oil pipe line. The video evokes a Persian Gulf landscape – dusty, baked, semi-apocalyptic and in the hands of M.I.A. and Gavras, "utterly hard-core". Dan Busheikin of CHARTattack described the outfits in the video as "ostentatious" and the driving "risky", calling the video "pretty badass". He welcomed M.I.A.'s "ditching of the gaudy GIF imagery and digital weirdo phase" of her early work, while feeling the singer remained "as flashy" and confident as ever.

=== Reception ===
Contemporary critics universally commended the music video for its themes and production values. The video was both heralded and criticised for confronting women's rights in Saudi Arabia; the portrayal of women wearing the niqāb driving cars is strictly prohibited in Saudi Arabia, while some media outlets accused the video of propagating Arab stereotypes. Claire Suddath of Time agreed that at first glance, the video appeared to be a political statement on women drivers in Saudi Arabia and a stylish, aesthetically pleasing piece, stating that the video was fun either way and that audiences could all agree that women and men should be able to "drag race, pop wheelies and drive their cars on two wheels" equally. Dina Dabbous of Jordanian publication Al Bawaba praised M.I.A. for presenting an accurate picture of male customs in the kingdom of Saudi Arabia, continuing "if she's being accused of stereotyping, then she’s turning the oriental fantasy on its head when she has Arabian women dressed in khaki styled, though still Arabian, dress or gear, toting guns and strutting their stuff with a swagger unknown to the conservative female society that has women closed off or 'haremed' from the male gaze. M.I.A's girls are a far-cry from the harem-veiled subversive mysterious women of the oriental fantasy in their floaty feminine veils, if we're accusing her of feeding stereotypes. She's toying with the militarized West infiltrating Arabia. Sexing it up a notch to have her 'bad girls' taking male guns and aggro".

Comfort Clinton of PopMatters hailed the video as "certainly" echoing the lyrics of the song "live fast, die young", with death-defying stunts and cars driving "more dramatic circles than M.I.A.'s hip gyrations", described M.I.A.'s concerns about the video as being "just part of" the daily grind for a true "Bad Girl". Elizabeth Broomhall, writing in Arabian Business, appreciated M.I.A. for "pushing boundaries" to get the world to pay attention to women's right to drive in the kingdom, and for being a female artist who "finally" did something different. Margaret Wappler of the Los Angeles Times noted the video as a "lady gangsta" fantasy but one that "played off" very real ingredients from life in the Middle East while a writer for The Huffington Post noted the video's similarities to previous videos by M.I.A. in bringing "real" swagger to a place seldom identified as a hotbed of youthful recklessness, adjudging the video to bring an overhaul to the song through its cinematic nature. Rap-Up described the visuals as "gritty" and "action-packed", which demanded viewers "made way for the pop-crusader". Lucy Jones of The Daily Telegraph described the video as sassy, energetic and dangerous, and noted the ginger child at the end of the video as a reference to "Born Free". A writer for Spin declared that thematically, the video "belonged in the same wheelhouse" as Beyoncé's "Run the World (Girls)" video, in its feminism and desert setting, but beyond their "surface similarities (big explosions, big emphasis on the girls)", the two clips veered off in different directions. The writer continued "Maya may be rapping about ladies' sexual dominance over men, but her clip is chaste – we're oohing and ahhing over car tricks, not hard bodies. Her girls are getting it done with skill rather than sexy." Elizabeth Flock writing in The Washington Post noted that the video was made at a time when Saudi women began fighting against the ban outside of court and online, while following the release of the video, two Saudi female activists – Manal al-Sharif and Samar Badawi – filed lawsuits against the government for refusing to give them a driver's licence, the first high-profile legal challenge to the country's ban on female drivers.

Naomi Zeichner of The Fader noted the video to be audacious, while Hua Hsu, writing for Grantland.com, praised Gavras as "strikingly" talented, making "scenes of faraway desperation look like the most beautiful, mysterious cologne advertisements ever" and the artistic vision of M.I.A. for delivering the audience "somewhere else". He noted that for some, the video would be further confirmation that "ornate scarves, wind-carved deserts, and Arabic script" were cool, while for others, it will "no doubt inspire a deeper investigation into globalism and globalization, feminism, the politics of oil, the West's influence in the Middle East, a career as a graduate student etc.". He concluded that the video was further example of what made M.I.A.'s "protest-in-the-name-of-what-exactly? so riveting, "important,"" and almost prophetic, saying "She flatters our desire for authenticity, for a real spokesperson who apprehends the full circumference of the planet, and then she goes and makes a bright, gaudy T-shirt of it all. If she has sold out – if she represented anything in the first place – then she's shown us exactly what our dollar can buy: an absolutely stunning video starring some of the Middle East's finest stunt drivers." Writing in Seattle Weekly, Todd Hamm described it as the best music video of the year so far.

The video won Best Direction, and Best Cinematography at the 2012 MTV Video Music Awards. It was also nominated for Video of the Year but lost out to Rihanna's "We Found Love". It was nominated for a 2013 Grammy Award for Best Short Form Music Video where it lost to Rihanna's "We Found Love" again. In 2019, Stereogum ranked it number one on their list of the best music videos of the 2010s.

== Use in media ==
Singer Gwen Stefani soundtracked her Fall/Winter L.A.M.B. fashion line presentation with a remix of the song during New York Fashion Week in February 2012. To celebrate their 60th anniversary, French clothing company Moncler commissioned 150 ice skaters to perform a routine to "Bad Girls" in Central Park for their 2012 New York Fashion Week Fall/Winter finale. The song was used to soundtrack several shows during London Fashion Week and Milan Fashion Week the same month.

"Bad Girls" is featured in episodes of several television series:

- 90210: "Blue Ivy" (Season 4)
- Gossip Girl: "It Girl, Interrupted" (Season 5)
- Skins (UK version): "Liv" (Series 6)
- Orphan Black: "Natural Selection" (first episode of series)
- The Mindy Project: "Pilot" and "Take Me with You" (season finale) (both Season 1). Also in "The Parent Trap" (season 4). This song usually plays when she is doing an important delivery. It played in the pilot episode when she is first seen at work during a delivery for a patient who was an immigrant with no insurance. The song plays again when she and the other doctors deliver triplets (their first time delivering triplets). Most recently, it was played in the episode "The Parent Trap' when she delivers the baby of the first patient of her fertility clinic.
- Supernatural: "Baby" (Season 11)
- Saturday Night Live: Season 41, Episode 4 skit
- Class: "The Metaphysical Engine, or What Quill Did" (Series 1)

The song is also heard in the trailers for The Heat, Spring Breakers, For a Good Time, Call..., Bad Girls Club and Vampire Academy. In addition, the song was used in the films Identity Thief, Son of a Gun, The Bling Ring and Vampire Academy. In 2014, "Bad Girls" was featured on the soundtrack of the PlayStation 4, Xbox One and PC versions of Grand Theft Auto V.

This song was featured at the end of Ken Block's Gymkhana Eight: Ultimate Exotic Playground; Dubai.

== Track listing ==
UK digital download

1. "Bad Girls" – 3:48

Remixes

1. "Bad Girls" (N.A.R.S. Remix) [featuring Missy Elliott and Azealia Banks] – 3:58
2. "Bad Girls" (Switch Remix) [featuring Missy Elliott and Rye Rye] – 3:23
3. "Bad Girls" (Leo Justi Remix) – 3:55

== Credits and personnel ==
- Songwriting – Mathangi Maya "M.I.A." Arulpragasam, Nate "Danja" Hills, Marcella Araica
- Production, all instruments – Danja
- Artwork – Mathangi Maya "M.I.A." Arulpragasam

== Charts ==
Chart (2012)	Peak position
Australia (ARIA)	81
Australia Urban (ARIA)	29
Belgium (Ultratip Bubbling Under Flanders)	38
Canada Hot 100 (Billboard)	92
Canada (Canadian Digital Songs)	66
France (SNEP)	61
Ireland (IRMA)	80
South Korea International Singles (Gaon)	52
Switzerland (Schweizer Hitparade)	61
UK Singles (Official Charts)	43
UK Airplay (Official Charts Company)	62
UK Hip Hop/R&B (Official Charts)	14
US Bubbling Under Hot 100 Singles (Billboard)	5
US Dance/Electronic Digital Songs (Billboard)	10
US R&B/Hip-Hop Digital Songs (Billboard)	40
US YouTube (Billboard)	9

== Certifications ==
Region	Certification	Certified units/sales
Brazil (Pro-Música Brasil)	Platinum	60,000^{‡}
United Kingdom (BPI)	Gold	400,000^{‡}
^{‡} Sales+streaming figures based on certification alone.

== Release history ==
Region	Date	Format	Label
United States	31 January 2012	Digital download	Self-released/Interscope
Worldwide	1 February 2012	Digital download	Self-released/Interscope
United States	28 February 2012	Rhythmic radio	Self-released/Interscope
Worldwide	12 March 2012	CD single	Mercury Records/Interscope
