= Steppin Up =

Single by M.I.A.

from the album Maya
- B-side: "Meds and Feds"
- Released: 16 June 2010
- Genre: Electronic; experimental hip hop; industrial
- Length: 4:01
- Label: N.E.E.T.; XL; Interscope
- Songwriters: Maya Arulpragasam; Christopher Mercer; Dave Taylor
- Producer: Rusko

M.I.A. singles chronology
"XXXO" (2010)	"Steppin Up" (2010)	"Teqkilla" (2010)

"Steppin Up" is a song by British recording artist M.I.A. from her third studio album, Maya (2010). The track was written by Maya "M.I.A." Arulpragasam, Rusko and Switch, and produced by Rusko. The song was self-released worldwide as a digital download, under license to XL Recordings and N.E.E.T. Recordings, on 16 June 2010, as the third single from the album. A different version of the song later appeared on the Vicki Leekx mixtape under a slightly altered title. The song was performed during the Maya Tour in 2010 and 2011. No music video has been made for the single. The track received mixed to positive reviews from music critics.

== Track listing ==
Digital download

1. "Steppin Up" – 4:01

12" vinyl single
A. "Steppin Up"
B. "Meds and Feds"

== Charts ==
Chart (2010)	Peak position
US Dance/Electronic Digital Songs (Billboard)	36

== Release history ==
Region	Date	Format	Label
Worldwide	16 June 2010	Digital download, streaming	XL Recordings, N.E.E.T. Recordings
