= Butler, Texas =

Butler, Texas, is the name of two unincorporated communities in the United States:

- Butler, Bastrop County, Texas
- Butler, Freestone County, Texas
