= XXXO =

2010 single by M.I.A.

Single by M.I.A.

from the album Maya
- Released: 11 May 2010 (digital); 12 July 2010 (physical)
- Recorded: 2010
- Genre: Synth-pop; dance-pop
- Length: 2:54
- Label: N.E.E.T.; XL; Interscope
- Songwriters: Maya Arulpragasam; Charles Smith; Cherry Byron-Withers
- Producers: Blaqstarr; Rusko

M.I.A singles chronology
"Born Free" (2010)	"XXXO" (2010)	"Steppin Up" (2010)

Jay-Z singles chronology
"Young Forever" (2009)	"XXXO" (2010)	"A Star Is Born" (2010)

Music video
- "XXXO" on YouTube

"XXXO" is a song by English recording artist M.I.A., released as the lead single from her third studio album, Maya (2010). The song was written by M.I.A., Charles "Blaqstarr" Smith and Cherry Byron-Withers, and produced by Blaqstarr and Rusko. "XXXO" was first released as a digital download following its world premiere on radio on 10 May 2010, and released in physical format in the United Kingdom on 28 June 2010. Two XXXO remix EPs were released alongside the single, featuring Jay-Z, SBTRKT, KickRaux amongst others on official remixes. The song's release followed the digital release of "Born Free", also from Maya.

An uptempo synth-pop song, "XXXO" exhibits a Tamil folk music-influenced melody with elements of techno and tribal music displayed. The song's instrumentation consists of marching band percussion, and backing vocals, drawing inspiration from pop music. "XXXO" is lyrically based on the theme of the creation of a sex symbol and romance in the digital age. Music critics praised the direction of the record, its playful lyrics and futuristic sound. An accompanying music video for the song was filmed by M.I.A. during the month of July 2010, who opted to direct herself having initially commissioned Hype Williams to direct. It features graphics interchange formats and animation of her album artwork, and depicts the singer singing seductively to the camera and scenes from her flip-cam, framed by stars, greeting card flower decorations and English words written in Arabic alphabet or A, B, Cs. The video features leopard imagery alongside references to social networking platforms such as MySpace and YouTube, with the singer singing "you want me be somebody who I'm really not" as the song's chorus. The video was nominated for the "Best Video" award at the 2011 UK Asian Music Awards. The "XXXO Burka" she wore to the 2010 Scream Awards was named by Time as the second top fashion statement of 2010.

Following the release of Maya, the song charted at number 26 in the United Kingdom and number 30 in Scotland, debuting at number two on the UK Indie Chart and number 12 on the UK R&B Chart. "XXXO" is M.I.A.'s second single to reach the UK top 40 and second most successful single in the UK after "Paper Planes" reached number 19 in 2009. The single debuted at number 74 in Australia, charted at number 39 in Spain, reached number 60 on the Billboard Japan Hot 100, and the top ten on the Danish radio airplay chart and in Belgium. "XXXO" was danced to by contestants Robert Roldan and Courtney Galliano of So You Think You Can Dance in 2010 for their Jazz selection. M.I.A. performed the song live for the first time at the Toronto Sound Academy in 2010. Critically, "XXXO" was lauded as yet another departure for M.I.A.. The song was listed at number two on the NME's best tracks of 2010 and in October 2011, the publication placed it at number 70 on its list "150 Best Tracks of the Past 15 Years".

== Background ==
"XXXO" was written by M.I.A., Charles Smith and Cherry Byron-Withers, and produced by Rusko and Blaqstarr. The single was premiered on BBC Radio 1 as Zane Lowe's "Hottest Record in the World" on 11 May 2010.

== Composition ==
"XXXO" is a synth-pop song that draws heavily from M.I.A.'s trademark percussion and clap beats in each bar and incorporates a folk style melody. "XXXO" is considered the most pop-influenced song on the album, with M.I.A. describing the song as showcasing her "cheesy pop side". "XXXO" is performed in a tempo of 120 beats per minute. Written in common time, the song is in verse-chorus form with a bridge before the fourth and final chorus repeating as the coda. The song's instrumentation is simple and minimal, consisting of electro keyboard synths, marching band percussion, beeps and bloops. Charles Aaron of Spin noted that the song was one of M.I.A.'s most plainspoken tracks, reminiscent of the "data-dazed R'n'B" of the song "Space" on the album. Ann Powers of the Los Angeles Times compared the song's chorus vocals favourably to those of Robyn and that her vocal style resembled a girlish coo of early 1980s new wavers, about a seduction that was artistic and not sensual.

"XXXO" is a portmanteau of "XXX", which most commonly represents pornography, and "XOXO", which implies kisses and hugs; a slant on teenage girls' charm, naivety, and their attempts to appeal to boys. "XXXO" is also meant to be a pun to "Excess Sex Oh", which expresses disapproval of the overly manifested sexuality of modern media. Lyrically, the song concerns the making of a sex symbol, and consists of M.I.A pulling a switcheroo on a pop template. The song's lyrics contain textspeak, and reference iPhones and Twitter. The bridge features the lyrics "Upload your photo / see below / you like what you see, you can download and store / we can find ways / just scan what you know / I can be that actress, you be Tarantino." A writer for Rap-Up describes the song as an angry love letter, noting how the singer laments over an overbearing boyfriend who is "tweeting [her] like Tweety Bird on [his] iPhone" before giving him the cold shoulder in the chorus "You want me be somebody who I'm really not." According to Powers, the male in her picture is Tarantino, less likely a lover than a producer trying to turn her big ideas into something more containable. The bridge features the lyrics "I can be that actress" but as the reviewer notes "she really can't. She's all push and pull; like her fellow 'post-feminist' art star Karen O, she understands that something's gotta break – either the role designed for her, or herself."

== Release and promotion ==
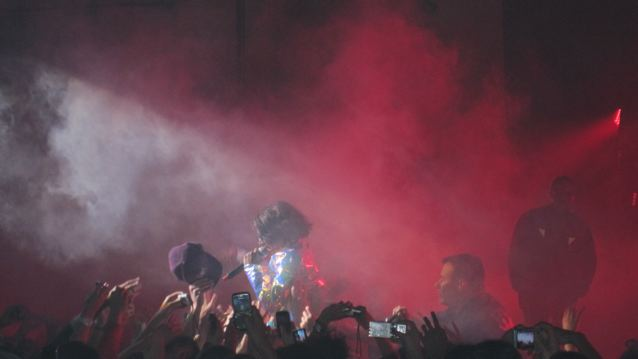
M.I.A. performing "XXXO" during her /\/\ /\ Y /\ Tour

The song was premiered on BBC Radio 1 on 10 May 2010 in the UK. It was released as a digital download on 11 May 2010 with the physical release of the single the following day. On 18 July 2010 it reached number 26 on the UK Singles Chart. "XXXO" was danced to by contestants Robert Roldan and Courtney Galliano of So You Think You Can Dance in 2010.

"XXXO"'s official remixes included contributions from Riton, SBTRKT and a dirty mix by Blaqstarr appearing on the UK 12-inch single released by XL Recordings. A red transparent 7-inch single was released featuring the main song and Blaqstarr dirty mix. An official main mix features rapper Jay-Z who previously appeared on a remix of the M.I.A. single "Boyz" from the How Many Votes Fix Mix EP. This main mix leaked onto the Internet on 10 June 2010. The US CD single features various official remixes including the Jay-Z main mix, two remixes of this mix by Fulton Yard with Walt Boogie and Rieces Pieces and those remixes by Riton and SBTRKT. Two digital EPs of these remixes to the song were released separately by her labels in June 2010 in 12-inch single, CD and download formats. XL Recordings and Interscope Records released XXXO (The Remixes) on 15 June 2010 and XXXO The Remixes Part 2 on 29 June 2010. DJ Qness and Mujava created their own remix which was circulated on the Internet, fusing South African Kwaito, house music and M.I.A.'s pop vocal alignment. On 15 June 2010, Zane Lowe made the Jay-Z remix his "Hottest Record in the World", a month following bestowing the single the same accolade. "XXXO" was released in the UK on 28 June 2010. Revealing her surprise that Jay-Z liked and decided to appear on the album version of "XXXO" and not Blaqstarr's dirty mix which was more "urban" sounding to the songwriter, M.I.A noted "It was interesting he liked the one with the crazy synths and stuff. It's more sort of [an] electro vibe ... and his verse is so great. It was good to hear him say the word 'metrosexual.' "

M.I.A. performed "XXXO" at the Sound Academy in Toronto in late 2009. On the red carpet to the Spike TV 2010 Scream Awards she wore the "XXXO Burka", a black burka – a traditional Islamic garment – printed with lyrics, the graphic "XO I Love You" inside a heart and artwork to the song and album, and revealing teal eye shadow, studded stilettos and yellow nail polish. The singer went with a different ensemble for her onstage performance later in the night, sporting a blue-turquoise wig, yellow sequined blouse, pink pants and green shoes to sing "Teqkilla." Time magazine placed the "XXXO Burka" at number two on its list of the "Top Ten Fashion Statements of 2010", stating "there was a sharp intake of breath when singer M.I.A. turned up at an awards event this year in one of the most controversial garments of our era: a burqa. For many, it's a symbol of oppression, representing the systematic silencing of female voices. For others, it's a symbol of liberation, freeing the women who wear it from oversexualization or objectification of the female form. Either way, at least we know it's versatile" before concluding that it was difficult to be offended by the friendly piece.

== Reception ==
=== Critical reaction ===
Professional ratings
Review scores
Source	Rating
Rolling Stone	3.5/4 stars

"XXXO" was acclaimed by music critics. Brad Wete of Entertainment Weekly had concerns about M.I.A.'s third album after listening to previous single "Born Free", but said with "XXXO" his worries had been eased. Wete wrote, "this techno-tinged dance record is what we hoped for from our Sri Lankan anti-pop star. It's an aggressive but friendly love cut dressed up with playful lyrics [...] It's the fun, naughty stuff we like." Rolling Stone's reviewer characterised the song as a "futuristic, tribal jam", revolving around "little more than reverb-dunked marching-band beat and M.I.A.'s tweaked-to-the-max vocals", before concluding "you have to admire her for always pushing her sound and art forward. When M.I.A. sings, "You want me be somebody who I'm really not", she does it with her middle finger raised high, pointing squarely at your face." PopMatters described the song as being "catchy, relatively straightforward dance pop", shedding the "Technicolor excesses" and world-music hybridity that listeners had come to expect from the rapper.

=== Commercial performance ===
"XXXO" debuted on the UK Singles Chart on 18 July 2010 at number 26, following the release of Maya. "XXXO" marks M.I.A.'s second top 40 single and second most successful single after "Paper Planes" reached number 19 in 2009. The single also debuted at number two on the UK Indie Chart behind Example's "Kickstarts", as well as number 12 on the UK R&B Chart.

=== Awards and accolades ===
The song was listed at number two on the NME's best tracks of 2010. The song placed number 101 on the Triple J Hottest 100, 2010, a list of the most popular songs of the year as chosen by listeners of Australian radio station Triple J. In October 2011, NME placed it at number 70 on its list "150 Best Tracks of the Past 15 Years". The music video was nominated for the "Best Video" award at the 2011 UK Asian Music Awards.

== Music video ==
The official music video was released on 11 August 2010 on her official Vevo account, following an announcement by M.I.A. on her Twitter feed that read "WORLD PREMIA XXXO XXXO XXXO VIDEO!!!YO!". The music video was to be directed by Hype Williams, but M.I.A. eventually directed the video. The quirky, playful visuals, evolved from animated web graphics based on M.I.A.'s own designs for the album cover and booklet. The video features shots filmed on M.I.A.'s flipcam. The video for "XXXO" references several online social networking sites and resembles online GIFs and animations that are popular on Arabic-language Internet forums, blogs, and social/dating websites. It features M.I.A. in a number of headshots amongst glittery floral graphics, resembling those made on Blingee. At one point in the clip, four white unicorns gallop across the screen. Golden Arabic-style calligraphy spells out her name and, at another point, the phrase "click here to download", written in a similar font, scrolls diagonally across the screen. The YouTube screenshots featured on the cover of the Maya's album also appear in the video, in various video feedback sequences. The video ends with the MySpace refrain "Thank you for adding me."

== Track listings ==
- Digital single
1. "XXXO" (Album Version) – 2:58
- UK 12" single

A1. "XXXO" – 2:58
A2. "XXXO" (Riton ReRub) – 3:48
B1. "XXXO" (SBTRKT Remix) – 3:33
B2. "XXXO" (Blaqstarr Dirty Mix) – 3:03

- UK digital single
1. "XXXO" – 2:54
2. "XXXO" (Riton ReRub) – 3:49
3. "XXXO" (SBTRKT Remix) – 3:33
4. "XXXO" (Blaqstarr Dirty Mix) – 3:04
5. "XXXO" (Various Remix) – 3:02
- US red transparent 7" single

A. "XXXO" (Album Version) – 2:58
B. "XXXO" (Blaqstarr Dirty Mix) – 3:03

- US CD single
1. "XXXO" (Fulton Yard/WaltBoogie Remix) featuring Jay-Z – 3:04
2. "XXXO" (Fulton Yard/Rieces Pieces Remix) featuring Jay-Z – 2:56
3. "XXXO" (Main Mix) featuring Jay-Z – 2:53
4. "XXXO" (SBTRKT Remix) – 3:33
5. "XXXO" (Various Remix) – 3:01
6. "XXXO" (Riton ReRub) – 3:48
- US digital EP – The Remixes
1. "XXXO" (Main Mix) featuring Jay-Z – 2:53
2. "XXXO" (Fulton Yard/WaltBoogie Remix) featuring Jay-Z – 3:04
3. "XXXO" (Fulton Yard/Rieces Pieces Remix) featuring Jay-Z – 2:56
- US digital EP – The Remixes Part 2
1. "XXXO" (SBTRKT Remix) – 3:33
2. "XXXO" (Various Remix) – 3:01
3. "XXXO" (Riton ReRub) – 3:48

== Personnel ==
Credits adapted from the liner notes of Maya.

- M.I.A. – vocals, songwriting
- Ben H. Allen – mixing
- Blaqstarr – production, songwriting
- Cherry Byron-Withers – songwriting
- Robert Gardiner – mix assistance
- Rusko – production

== Charts ==
Chart (2010)	Peak position
Australia (ARIA)	74
Belgium (Ultratip Bubbling Under Flanders)	7
Denmark Airplay (Tracklisten)	3
Japan (Japan Hot 100)	54
Japan (Billboard Adult Contemporary Airplay)	29
Scottish Singles Sales (Official Charts)	25
Spain (Promusicae)	39
UK Singles (Official Charts)	26
UK Indie (Official Charts)	2
UK Hip Hop/R&B (Official Charts)	12
US Dance/Electronic Digital Songs (Billboard)	12
US Rock Digital Songs (Billboard)	41
