= Alabama Sacred Harp Singers =

Informal group of sacred harp singers

The Alabama Sacred Harp Singers were any of the informal groups participating in four recorded Sacred Harp singing sessions in Alabama in the 20th century, who were thereafter credited by that name as artists or performers in the published versions of those recordings.

The informal nature of Sacred Harp singing makes it difficult to identify performers in the usual sense. The music is rarely performed by a well-rehearsed ensemble in concert or recording studio settings, but rather is sung by attendees at gatherings and conventions, usually open to the public. Alabama Sacred Harp Singers has referred to several such ad hoc groups of singers in Alabama.

== Recordings ==
On April 16, 1928, a group led by J.C. Brown and S. Whit Denson recorded several songs for Columbia Records, amongst which were "Present Joys" and "Rocky Road", later included on the Anthology of American Folk Music.

In August 1942, Alan Lomax recorded the Alabama Sacred Harp Singing Convention in Birmingham. These recordings were edited by George Pullen Jackson and published by the Library of Congress.

In 1959, Lomax returned to Alabama to record the 56th convention of the United Sacred Harp Musical Association in Fyffe. This recording is variously credited to either the "United Sacred Harp Convention" or "Alabama Sacred Harp Singers". Samples from this recording of Sarah Lancaster's "The Last Words of Copernicus" appear in both M.I.A.'s "Tell Me Why" and Bruce Springsteen's "Death to My Hometown".

Finally, "Alabama Sacred Harp Singers" may refer to a recording by Stephen McCallum at the Alabama and Florida Union Singing Convention at Greater Old Salem Baptist Church in Dale County, Alabama, on September 26, 1980.
