= It Takes a Muscle to Fall in Love =

1982 single by Spectral Display

Single by Spectral Display

from the album Spectral Display
- B-side: "Tango"
- Released: 1982
- Genre: New wave, synth-pop
- Length: 3:28
- Label: EMI
- Songwriters: Michel Mulders, Henri Overduin
- Producer: Michel Mulders

"It Takes a Muscle to Fall in Love" is the debut single by Dutch electronic band Spectral Display, released as a single in 1982 from their eponymous debut album. It was written by members Michel Mulders and Henri Overduin, and produced by Mulders.

The song charted on the Dutch Single Tip Chart in the week dated 4 September 1982.

== M.I.A. version ==
"It Takes a Muscle"

Single by M.I.A.

from the album Maya
- Released: 20 December 2010
- Genre: Dubtronica
- Length: 3:03
- Label: N.E.E.T.; XL; Interscope
- Songwriters: Michael Mulders; Henri Overduin
- Producer: Diplo

M.I.A. singles chronology
"Tell Me Why" (2010)	"It Takes a Muscle" (2010)	"Internet Connection" (2011)

British recording artist M.I.A. covered "It Takes a Muscle to Fall in Love" in 2010, titled "It Takes a Muscle". It is from her third studio album, Maya.

Production of M.I.A.'s version was handled by Diplo and incorporated reggae elements. The single was released worldwide as a digital download, under license to XL Recordings and N.E.E.T. Recordings, on 20 December 2010. Prior to the official release of the single, Diplo uploaded the song to his SoundCloud account on 26 October 2010. The song served as the sixth single from the album. After audience encouragement, M.I.A. performed "It Takes a Muscle" at Terminal 5, New York City in September and on British TV show Later... with Jools Holland in December 2010. The track received positive feedback from music critics.

Promo copies of the single announced that a music video for the song, directed by Spike Jonze, would be released. However, the video was never released and it is unknown whether it has ever been filmed.

=== Track listing ===
Digital download

1. "It Takes a Muscle" – 3:03
2. "It Takes a Muscle" (Pearson Sound Refix) – 5:53

Promo CD

1. "It Takes a Muscle" (Radio Edit) – 2:38
2. "It Takes a Muscle" (Original) – 3:00

12" single

1. "It Takes a Muscle" (Pearson Sound Refix)

=== Release history ===
Region	Date	Format	Label
Worldwide	20 December 2010	Digital download, streaming	XL Recordings, N.E.E.T. Recordings

== Other versions ==
In 2019, Australian musician Kirin J. Callinan covered the song for his covers album Return to Center.
