= Space (M.I.A. song) =

Song by M.I.A.

from the album Maya
- Released: 12 January 2010
- Recorded: 11–12 January 2010
- Genre: Electronic; chill-out
- Length: 3:08
- Label: N.E.E.T.; XL; Interscope
- Songwriter(s): M.I.A.; Rusko
- Producer(s): Rusko; M.I.A.

"Space" is a song by British recording artist M.I.A. from her third studio album, Maya (2010). The track was written and produced by Maya "M.I.A." Arulpragasam and Christopher "Rusko" Mercer. The song was released on 12 January 2010 as a music video only, and has been known under alternative titles "There's Space for Ol Dat I See" and "Space Odyssey". The track was a protest to an article by The New York Times calling Sri Lanka the number one vacation destination of 2010, which M.I.A. found questionable and inaccurate towards the country's Civil War.

Although "Space" was the first song that M.I.A. teased from the forthcoming album, it was never released as an official single. The track did, however, chart upon the release of Maya. The song charted at number 67 on the Canadian Digital Songs chart and number 9 on the Dance/Electronic Digital Songs chart.

== Composition ==
According to former Los Angeles Times writer Ann Powers, "Space" is a "chill-out room seduction".

== Music video ==
The video for the song was uploaded only on Twitter's Twitvid on 12 January 2010, and filmed the night before for $100. It pictures green-lit M.I.A. against a black background, moving in a series of astral projections.

== Charts ==
Chart (2010)	Peak position
Canada (Canadian Digital Songs)	67
US Dance/Electronic Digital Songs (Billboard)	9
