= Born Free (M.I.A. song) =

Single by M.I.A.

from the album Maya
- Released: 23 April 2010
- Recorded: 2009
- Genre: Punk rock; alternative rock; electropunk; noise rock
- Length: 4:10; 9:06 (Video Version)
- Label: N.E.E.T.; XL; Interscope
- Songwriters: Maya Arulpragasam; Dave Taylor; Alan Vega; Martin Rev
- Producers: M.I.A.; Switch

M.I.A. singles chronology
"Paper Planes" (2008)	"Born Free" (2010)	"XXXO" (2010)

Music video
- Born Free” Video on YouTube

"Born Free" is a song by English Tamil recording artist M.I.A., released alongside an accompanying short film/music video of the same name from her third album, Maya. XL Recordings and Interscope Records/N.E.E.T. released "Born Free" as a digital download from the album on 23 April 2010, with the music video released on 26 April 2010. "Born Free" was written and produced by Maya "M.I.A." Arulpragasam and Dave "Switch" Taylor. The artwork for the single was released on 25 April 2010.

"Born Free" was her next release following the track "O... Saya" from the film Slumdog Millionaire and the birth of her son in 2009. The song is an organ and drum driven track based on a sample of Suicide's "Ghost Rider", therefore crediting Alan Vega and Martin Rev as co-writers, and is considered more aggressive than the other songs of the album. High Contrast provided an official remix to the song. The song was praised for its lyrics and composition as statement-making and provocatively complementary to the artist's intentions for the piece, its artwork and accompanying video.

The music video, which depicts a genocide against red-haired people, was filmed in California and directed by Romain Gavras as a nine-minute short film without the prior knowledge of M.I.A.'s record labels. Several incidents relating to the extrajudicial killing of Tamil males by the Sri Lankan Army filmed on mobile phones in Sri Lanka, some of which had been broadcast by news outlets worldwide, inspired M.I.A.'s treatment for the film-video. The video's portrayal of military force, violence and brutality met with a positive critical reception but much controversy worldwide, including a temporary ban from YouTube in the US and UK, with some critics hailing its representation of oppression and political turmoil and others criticising the explicit material in the video. The way the film was shot and the themes it covered drew comparisons to previous works by the artist, and other writer-directors' films such as The Hurt Locker and Punishment Park. It earned a nomination for "Best Dance Video" at the 2010 UK Music Video Awards.

"Born Free" debuted on the UK Singles Chart at number 156, the Swedish Singles Chart at number 58 and earned a position on the UK Indie Singles Chart at number 13 despite no prior promotion for the song. NME ranked the song to be the eleventh best release of 2010 and positioned the video number thirteen on its 2011 list of the "100 Top Greatest Music Videos Ever Made". The same year, the video placed at number 2 on Time magazine's list of the "Top 10 Controversial Music Videos" of all time.

== Background ==
Written and produced by Maya "M.I.A." Arulpragasam and Dave "Switch" Taylor, "Born Free" opens with a frantic rhythm built around a sample from the song "Ghost Rider" by the synthpunk band Suicide, written by Martin Rev and Alan Vega, and was written as a reaction to what the singer experienced between 2009–2010. Following the release and success of M.I.A.'s previous studio album Kala (2007), the singer revealed her intention to retire from the music industry and focus on starting a family. The worldwide success of the album's third single "Paper Planes" and her collaboration with A. R. Rahman, "O... Saya", for the soundtrack of the film Slumdog Millionaire, led some critics to believe M.I.A. would return to recording a third album following the birth of her son in 2009, although neither the artist or her label confirmed this. In May and June 2009, M.I.A. took to Twitter and interviews to condemn the onslaught of the Sri Lankan government against Tamils in the Vanni, with reports that at least 50,000 civilians had been killed from government shelling in the first five months of the year. She tweeted "Born Free! No Freedom! No Free !" on 4 June 2009, before debuting the song "Born Free" during her concert at San Francisco's Outside Lands Music and Arts Festival in August 2009. The song was released via iTunes and the rapper's official website page on 23 April 2010. The next day, she uploaded the lines from the song "you might try to find ways to be happier / you might end up somewhere in ethiopia / take [sic] a bite out of life make it snappier / ordinary gon super trippyer / so i check shit coz im lippyer / and split a cheque like slovakia" onto Twitter, before providing a link to the song on the N.E.E.T. official website. Its artwork sleeve was debuted by M.I.A.'s official website on 25 April 2010. "XXXO", the lead single from Maya, was released next on 11 May 2010 via digital download. Explaining the inspiration for her new releases in 2010, she told George Stroumboulopoulos of The Hour at the end of that year, "when Paper Planes happened, I was too busy to take note, I wasn't out there promoting it and doing any of this shit because, this 25-year-old civil war was coming to an end in my country, and I was making new understandings, new observations and new experiences that was happening to me which didn't add up to what was going on over here."

=== Artwork ===
The single artwork depicts a still from mobile phone footage first obtained and broadcast by Channel 4 News in the United Kingdom on 25 August 2009, that shows the extrajudicial killing of Tamil males by Sri Lankan government soldiers earlier that year, underlined by an image of YouTube's customised error message. M.I.A. tweeted a link to a Channel 4 News article on 3 September 2009, covering the United Nations' initial response to the broadcast footage. The footage would later appear in the documentary Sri Lanka's Killing Fields in 2011, exposing war crimes committed in Sri Lanka in 2009.

== Composition ==
"Born Free" is an uptempo rock song, written in common time to a tempo of 96 beats per minute. The song's instrumentation features distorted bass guitars, keyboards, drum machine, an airhorn and heavy drums incorporating alternative rock, electropunk and noise rock genres. Carter Maness of Spinner notes that "Born Free" opens with a loose, free jazz drum-circle stomp that gathers momentum until the track explodes into a rapid-fire punk vamp with razor-saw bass tones. The song is built around the distorted synth riff from Suicide's "Ghost Rider". Consisting of echoing M.I.A. vocals, the singer's vocal style and delivery is considered more aggressive than usual and is at times reminiscent of Alan Vega's vocal delivery in "Ghost Rider".

Lyrically, the first verse begins with the lines "Yeah man made power / Stood like a tower / Higher, higher, hello! / And the higher you go / you feel lower, Oh! / I was close to the edge / staying under cover / staying under cover / And with my nose to the ground / I found my sound" and ends with "Got myself an interview tomorrow / got myself a jacket for a dolla / ... /I don't wanna live for tomorrow / I push my luck today / I throw this shit in your face when I see ya / Cause I got something to say /" before repeating in the chorus "I was born free". She references Utopia, Ethiopia and Slovakia in the song's second verse. The song's coda sees the songwriter turn the scrutiny on herself, stating "I Don't wanna talk about money, 'cos I got it / I Don't wanna talk about hoochies, 'cos I been it / And I don't wanna be fake, but you can do it".

== Critical reception ==
Slant Magazine stated that "word is that most of the record won't explore this kind of sound. Even so, it's a hell of a one-off, and it should pique expectations for the new record simply by proving that M.I.A.'s bag of studio tricks is as inexhaustible as her attitude." Nick Levine of Digital Spy described the track as a "blistering statement of intent" with a result that was "an almighty racket, but the best kind of almighty racket." Ryan Dombal of Pitchfork noted that M.I.A. had made a punk rock rebel anthem with the song. August Brown of the Los Angeles Times felt that as a song, "Born Free" felt like a teaser with "zero ambition toward structure or development, more like intriguing mixtape fodder than any statement of purpose for her forthcoming record." He praised M.I.A.'s vocals as sounding "great ... echoed out to oblivion while repurposing lyrical punk bromides from the Misfits and idle rap boasts like "I don't want to talk about money, 'cause I got it", and complimented the music direction as being in the same vein as her proteges, the band Sleigh Bells. The Guardian's Douglas Haddow writes that "Born Free", "which presumably takes its title from article 1 of the UN's Universal Declaration of Human Rights, is a kick to the gut or a wink and a nudge depending on how you look at it."

== Promotion, cover versions and media use ==
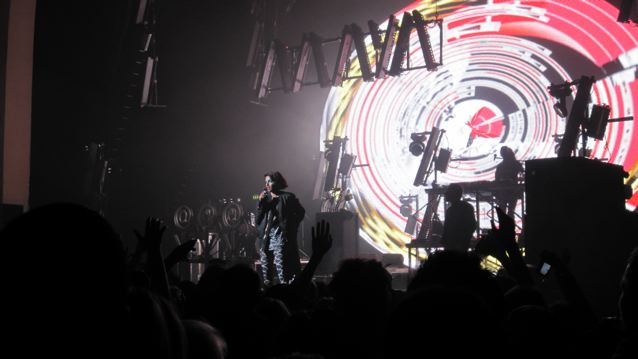
M.I.A. performing "Born Free" during the Maya Tour at the Brixton Academy in London

The song was debuted live at San Francisco's Outside Lands Music and Arts Festival in August 2009. M.I.A. promoted the track with an appearance on the Late Show with David Letterman, during which she performed "Born Free" with Martin Rev of Suicide playing keyboards, backed by a group of dancers styled to look like M.I.A. In November 2010 she appeared on Later... with Jools Holland on British television, performing "Born Free" and "It Takes a Muscle", the former accompanied by Victoria Smith on drums and the latter with members of The Specials.

Speaking more about touring in support of the album and the track at the Big Day Out, M.I.A. told David Farrier of 3 News at the beginning of 2011 how it felt "amazing" to perform for fans in Europe during her Maya Tour following the reaction to the video, negative press and how it "blew out of proportion" in 2010, saying "I felt that the fans that turned up to support that and support the video, they just meant more to me, and you know, it was me and my baby was on tour as well, so the whole thing was meaningful, cause they weren't just there cause they liked the shoes I was wearing in a magazine, but they were there because of a bigger reason. I think that was really important to go and see."

The song has been covered by noise rock band Boogie Monster. The song's video is referenced in the intro to the song "Nando's Skank" by Example and Ed Sheeran. The song was also featured during the E3 2010 teaser trailer for Need For Speed: Hot Pursuit, but it was replaced with "Tainted Love" in the YouTube version of the same trailer.

Featured in the film Triangle of Sadness.

== Awards and accolades ==
"Born Free" ranked number 45 on Metromix list of the "Best Songs of 2010", comparing it favourably to the Beastie Boys' "Sabotage" and describing it as a "hip hop spin on punk rock ... it flat out rocks." The online music service Rhapsody placed it at position 46 on their Top 50 Singles of 2010 list. "Born Free" placed number 30 on the Village Voice's Pazz & Jop poll of the top singles of 2010, and ranked number 11 on NME's list of the Top Tracks of 2010. German music magazines Intro and Musikexpress placed the song at number 33 in their lists of the best singles of the year while Heineken España named "Born Free" the seventh best song released in 2010. The song's music video was nominated in the category "Best Dance Video" at the 2010 UK Music Video Awards. In 2011, NME ranked the song's music video number thirteen on the list of the 100 Top Greatest Music Videos ever made. It was listed number 2 on Time's 2011 list of the "Top 10 Controversial Music Videos" ever made.

== Music video ==
The music video for "Born Free" was directed by Romain Gavras. The video, which depicts a genocide against red-haired people, was filmed in California and directed by Romain Gavras as a nine-minute short film without the prior knowledge of M.I.A.'s record labels. Several incidents relating to the extra-judicial killing of Tamil males by the Sri Lankan Army filmed on mobile phones in Sri Lanka, some of which had been broadcast by news outlets worldwide, inspired M.I.A.'s treatment for the film-video. The video's portrayal of military force, violence and brutality met with a positive critical reception but much controversy worldwide, including a ban from YouTube in the US and UK, with some critics hailing its representation of oppression and political turmoil and others criticizing the explicit material in the video. The way the film was shot and the themes it covered drew comparisons to previous works by the artist, and other writer-directors' films such as The Hurt Locker and Punishment Park. It earned a nomination for "Best Dance Video" at the 2010 UK Music Video Awards.

== Credits and personnel ==
- Songwriting – Mathangi Maya "M.I.A." Arulpragasam, Dave "Switch" Taylor, Alan Vega, Martin Rev
- Production – M.I.A., Switch
- Mixing – Switch
- Artwork – Mathangi Maya "M.I.A." Arulpragasam

== Charts ==
Chart (2010)	Peak position
Swedish Singles Chart	58
UK Singles Chart	156
UK Indie (Official Charts)	13
