= Sarah Lancaster (composer) =

American composer

A performance of "The Last Words of Copernicus"

Sarah "Sally" Lancaster (April 28, 1834 – April 13, 1918) was an American composer in the Sacred Harp tradition. Three of her songs were published: "The Last Words of Copernicus", "I'm on My Journey Home", and "Sardis".

== Biography ==
Lancaster was born in Talbot County, Georgia, April 28, 1834. Her parents were James Lupo Lancaster and Charity Lancaster, formerly of Edgecombe County, North Carolina. Through her father she was a descendant of the Italian Jewish musician Peter Lupo, who had emigrated to England and was active at the court of Elizabeth I. She had two sisters, Anna Lucinda Maria Atkinson Lancaster, known as "Ann", and Priscilla R. Lancaster, known as "Sid"; all three were musical, and both others contributed hymns to editions of the Sacred Harp. All three were students of Benjamin Franklin White and J. P. Reese, the latter of whom assisted them in their compositions. Sarah studied in Hamilton, Georgia, likely at the Hamilton Female Institute, where she expressed an interest in music and took piano lessons. It appears that she boarded with White's family during this time in her life; she also developed the habit of sending original compositions to friends and family along with her letters. She married George Washington "Wash" Hagler on November 28, 1866, bearing him five children. In 1876 the family left Georgia, arriving in Butler, Freestone County, Texas, early in 1877. They remained there until sometime in the 1880s – they are listed as residents there in the 1880 census – but by 1886 had moved to Oakwood, Texas; there she died and was buried in the town cemetery. Lancaster continued to send music home after her move, and would inquire in letters to family about "the singings" she had left behind. It was said of her that she was a "sweet singer" and "a Christian woman, of a lovable disposition".

== Legacy ==
Bruce Springsteen sampled a 1959 Alan Lomax recording of "The Last Words of Copernicus" in his song "Death to My Hometown"; M.I.A. incorporates a fragment of the same recording into her single "Tell Me Why".
