= Internet Connection =

Single by M.I.A.

from the album Maya
- Released: 11 January 2011
- Recorded: Alternative hip hop
- Length: 2:49
- Label: N.E.E.T.; XL; Interscope
- Songwriters: Maya Arulpragasam; Charles Smith
- Producers: M.I.A.; Blaqstarr

M.I.A. singles chronology
"It Takes a Muscle" (2010)	"Internet Connection" (2011)	"Bad Girls" (2012)

"Internet Connection" is a song by British recording artist M.I.A. from the deluxe edition of her third studio album, Maya (2010). The track was written and produced by Maya "M.I.A." Arulpragasam, and Blaqstarr. Originally titled "I'm Down Like Your Internet Connection", the song was inspired by the issues M.I.A. had with her own Internet connection and a lengthy phone call with Verizon tech support. She eventually asked one of the workers to sing the lyrics down the phone, and used the recording in the final track. The song was released as the seventh and final single from the album, on 11 January 2011 as a digital download, under license to XL Recordings and exclusive license to Interscope in the USA. The EP featured remixes by artists including Flux Pavilion, Buraka Som Sistema, Huoratron and Tony Senghore.

== Track listing ==
Digital download

1. "Internet Connection" (Flux Pavilion Remix) – 5:06
2. "Internet Connection" (Buraka Som Sistema Remix) – 5:31
3. "Internet Connection" (Huoratron Remix) – 7:05
4. "Internet Connection" (Tony Senghore Remix) – 7:16

Promo CD<

1. "Internet Connection" – 2:49
2. "Internet Connection" (instrumental) – 2:42

== Release history ==
Region	Date	Format	Label
Worldwide	17 January 2011	Digital download, streaming	XL Recordings, Interscope
