= De Kreun =

Coordinates: 50.825°N 3.2609°E

De Kreun is a concert hall in the Belgian city of Kortrijk. The Dutch term "Kreun" literally translates into English as "groan". It is a concert venue located in the centre of Kortrijk where most of all pop and rock concerts take place. De Kreun also serves as an organisation who supports new musical talent.

== History ==
De Kreun started as a small and local club in Bissegem, a suburb just outside the centre of Kortrijk. In 2006, De Kreun celebrated its 25th anniversary. In the same period, the club moved to the city centre of Kortrijk, in an old Cinemacomplex downtown (Den Gouden Lanteern), while the offices moved to the Music Centre Track, near the conservatory, in the former VRT-buildings.

During fall 2009, a brand new concert venue was opened with a concert hall, spaces for workshops, rehearsal, recording studio's etc. near the Music Centre Track.
