= Teqkilla =

Single by M.I.A.

from the album Maya
- Released: 29 June 2010
- Genre: Industrial hip hop; deconstructed club
- Length: 6:19
- Label: N.E.E.T.; XL; Interscope
- Songwriters: Maya Arulpragasam; Christopher Mercer; Dave Taylor; John Hill; Cherry Byron-Withers
- Producers: M.I.A.; Rusko; Switch; John Hill

M.I.A. singles chronology
| "Steppin Up" (2010) | "Teqkilla" (2010) | "Tell Me Why" (2010) |

"Teqkilla" is a song by British recording artist M.I.A. from her third studio album, Maya (2010). The track was written by Maya "M.I.A." Arulpragasam, Rusko, Switch, John Hill and Cherry Byron-Withers. Production of the song was handled by M.I.A., Rusko, Switch and Hill.

The song references alcohol and cannabis in its lyrics. M.I.A. namechecks several brands of alcohol, notably Chivas Regal, owned by Seagram, which in turn belonged to her then-fiancé Benjamin Bronfman's family.

The song was released worldwide as a digital download, under license to XL Recordings and N.E.E.T. Recordings, on 16 June 2010 as the fourth single from the album. The 'Lost My Fone Out wiv Nicki Minaj Remix' of the song was made available in July 2010, and features a guest verse by Nicki Minaj. M.I.A. performed "Teqkilla" at the 2010 Scream Awards, and during the Maya Tour in 2010 and 2011. No music video was made for the single.

== Critical response ==
The track received mixed opinions from music critics.

It has been described as "a little insubstantial" and a "throwaway", and its lyrics referred to as "inane" and "nonsense". Some also criticized the track's running time of over 6 minutes.

On the other hand, "Teqkilla" was noted for its "rousing beat" and "catchy chorus", and named not only "one of the better songs from the album", but also one of the 10 best M.I.A. songs ever.

== Track listing ==
Digital download

1. "Teqkilla" – 6:19

== Charts ==
| Chart (2010) | Peak position |
|---|---|
| Canada (Canadian Hot 100) | 93 |
| Canada (Canadian Digital Songs) | 65 |
| US Dance/Electronic Digital Songs (Billboard) | 11 |

== Release history ==
| Region | Date | Format | Label |
|---|---|---|---|
| Worldwide | 29 June 2010 | Digital download, streaming | XL Recordings, N.E.E.T. Recordings |
