= Born Free (music video) =

- Directed by: Romain Gavras
- Written by: Romain Gavras; Maya Arulpragasam
- Starring: Ian Hamrick
- Cinematography: Andre Chemetoff
- Music by: Maya "M.I.A." Arulpragasam
- Distributed by: XL Recordings; Interscope Geffen A&M
- Release date: 26 April 2010 (premiere)
- Running time: 9:06
- Country: United States
- Language: English
- Budget: $250,000 (estimated)

"Born Free" is the music video for English recording artist M.I.A.'s song of the same name. The video, which depicts a genocide against red-haired people, was filmed in California and directed by Romain Gavras as a nine-minute short film without the prior knowledge of M.I.A.'s record labels. Several incidents relating to the extrajudicial killing of Tamil males by the Sri Lankan Army filmed on mobile phones in Sri Lanka, some of which had been broadcast by news outlets worldwide, inspired the treatment for the film-video. The video's portrayal of military force, violence and brutality met with a positive critical reception, but much controversy worldwide, including a ban from YouTube in the US and UK. Some critics hailed its representation of oppression and political turmoil, while others criticised the more explicit material. The way the film was shot and the themes it covered drew comparisons to previous works by the artist, and other writer-directors' films such as The Hurt Locker and Punishment Park. It earned a nomination for "Best Dance Video" at the 2010 UK Music Video Awards.

== Development ==
The music video-short film, filmed in Los Angeles and Lancaster, California on 15 January 2010 was written by M.I.A. and directed by French director Romain Gavras. Gavras, who directed the video for the song "Stress" by Justice which proved controversial after release, dealt with themes of "real and fake" which complemented M.I.A.'s vision for the video. M.I.A. intended for the video to depict something real "made not real" to reach a wider audience. The video would depict the footage of the extrajudicial killing of Tamil males she had uploaded three months prior onto her Twitter feed. Red haired men were used in the video following teasing of Maya collaborator Rusko in the studio during the album's recording. The songwriter stated it was one of those "ideas where people would beat the shit out of me because I was ginger [a natural redhead]. It has a whole double meaning. The gingers are kind of anyone who’s been oppressed...I didn't think she'd actually do it." Other roles in the video are played by veterans from the U.S. Army returning from wars in Afghanistan and Iraq; the video also features fake blood and ketchup imported from China. Gavras went on to direct the film Our Day Will Come, a continuation of the ginger-genocide theme of the video-short.

== Synopsis ==
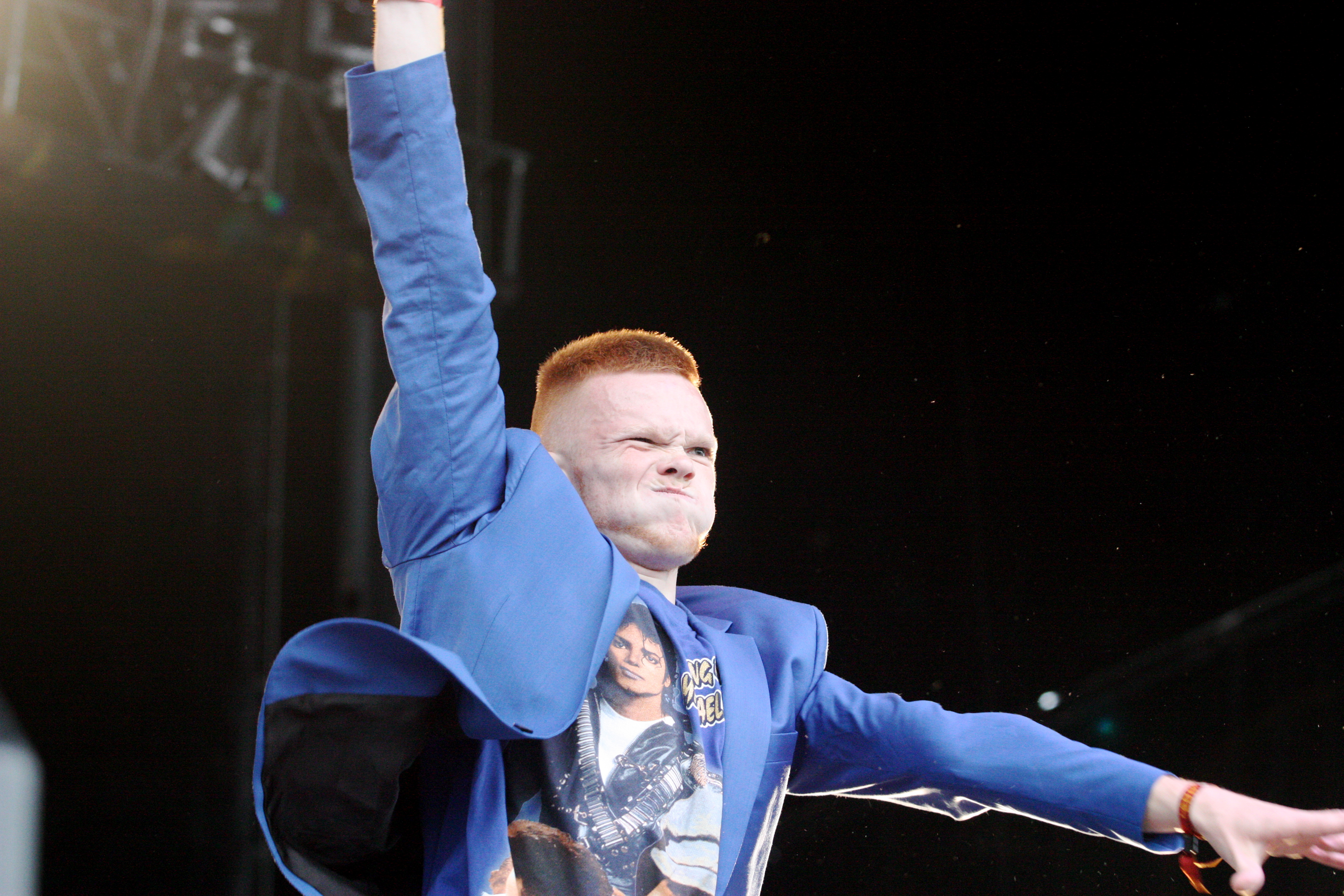
M.I.A.'s dancer "WhyteBoi" from the /\/\/\Y/\ Tour appears in the film.

The film is over nine minutes long and depicts a SWAT team driving up to a building and staging a raid, during which they ignore a man sitting in a room smoking a crack pipe, beat a couple engaged in coitus, and then force a young red-haired man violently into a detainee transport vehicle. Other red-heads are rounded up. Some of the SWAT team members wear American flags on their uniforms. During the video, a mural is seen depicting armed red-headed men and the slogan "Our day will come", the historic motto of the Irish Republican Army (Tiocfaidh ár lá). Keffiya-wearing red-haired young people throw rocks and glass bottles at the armored vehicles transporting the detainees, in an apparent reference to the iconic images of the Second Palestinian "Intifada". The detainees are then driven out to the desert, treated brutally, and forced to run across a live minefield. During the course of events, a young red-headed boy is shot through the head, and another is blown to pieces after stepping on a live mine while the soldiers continue to chase, beat, and shoot the captives.

The "Born Free" film includes graphic violence and language, as well as nudity. Ian Hamrick, the 12-year-old red-haired actor whose character is shot in the head in the film, described the video as "showing violence to end violence." He felt a potency in the video absent from far more graphic video game media such as Call of Duty or Grand Theft Auto. Giving more details on his role in an interview to the Los Angeles Times, Hamrick said M.I.A. complimented his work on set, stating "She wanted to make sure I was OK, that I knew what was happening and why she killed [my character]. I said I did, that she really accomplished her goal of getting people to talk about something they don’t usually see."

== Release and critical response ==
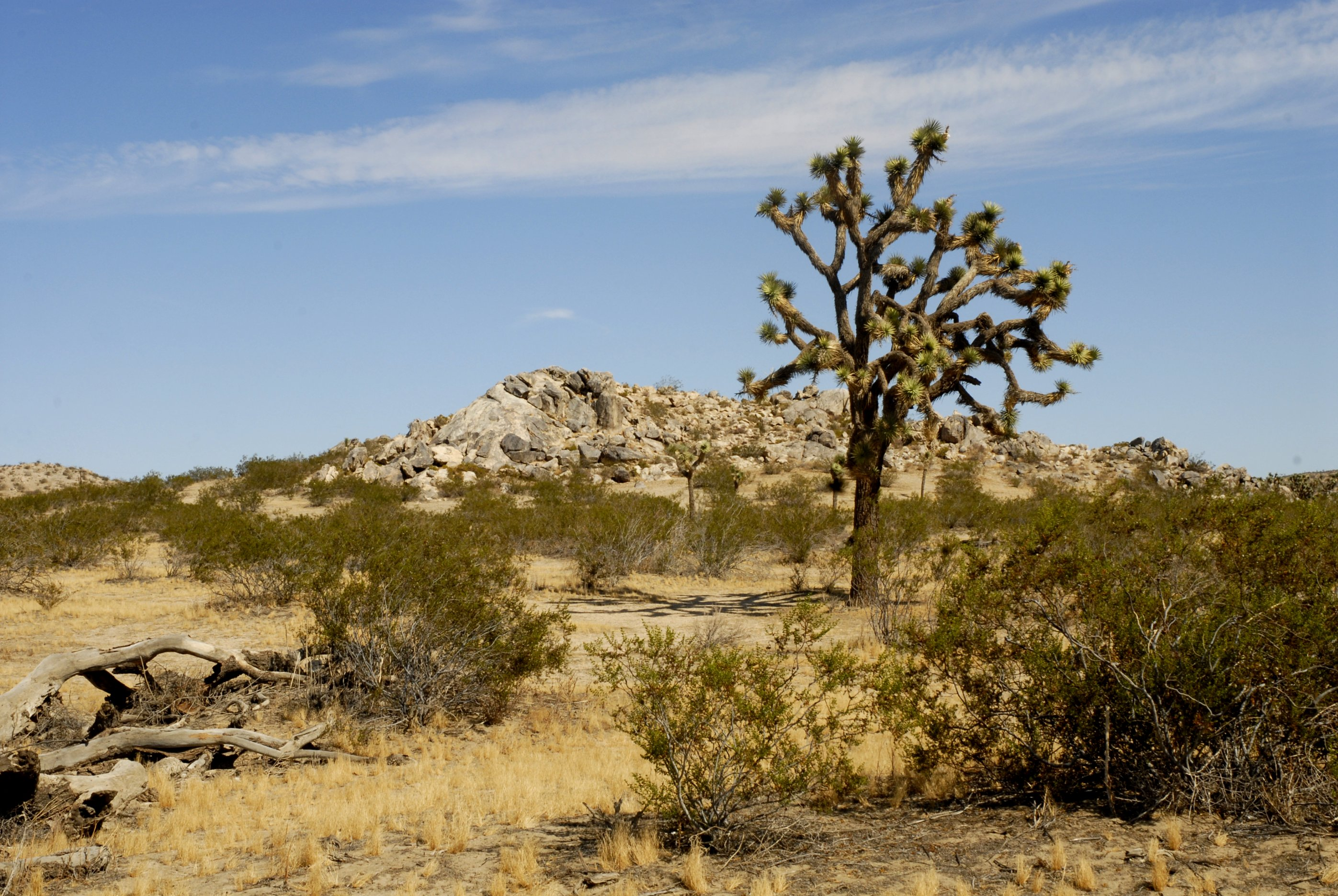
The music video was partly filmed at the Lancaster, California desert, imaged above

On 26 April 2010, the music video was released online and was immediately noted as political allegory, drawing parallels to genocides and many indigenous resistance movements around the world. Its content elicited strong, widespread discussion across the world. Real life parallels were drawn with the issue of immigration in the American state of Arizona, the treatment of prisoners by U.S. troops at the Abu Ghraib prison in Baghdad, and, more universally, the brutal tactics used against minorities by government forces around the world.

The Huffington Post stated "Whether it's a comment on the absurdity of genocide (of which M.I.A. saw plenty during her early childhood in Sri Lanka) or a challenge to the idea of "other" in Arizona's immigration law, it is startling even in the context of recent genre-bending music art-films." Zach Baron, writing in The Village Voice added "NSFW isn't exactly the word. More like art film? We can think of no goofier political allegory than the persecution, abuse, and murder of redheads, but then again, M.I.A.'s politics have never been of the kind you read about in the New York Times." James Montgomery of MTV described it as "unflinchingly, unapologetically real" depicting "the kind of things that most nations – including the U.S., which is portrayed as the aggressor in the clip – often pretend don't happen: the rounding-up of ethnic minorities, the trampling of personal liberties, the bullying of the powerless by those with authority." Ann Powers wrote in the Los Angeles Times that the video "concentrated fully" on the physical horror of gun butts and bullets hitting flesh, with the scenes giving added poignancy to the lyrical themes of the song. Interpreted as a comment on desensitised attitudes towards violence, others found that the video stressed that genocide still exists and violent repression remains commonplace. Some critics described the film as "sensationalist". Neda Ulaby of NPR described the video as intended for "shock value" in the service of nudging people into considering real issues that can be hard to talk about. Haddow wrote further in The Guardian that particularly notable about the video was its use of red headed individuals as a proxy for anyone who has felt the brunt of a jackboot. The effect of this was that the viewer was "expected to empathise with the victim, rather than the aggressor." Haddow stated that this sat in "stark contrast" to the bulk of recent films on the subject of the Afghan and Iraq wars such as Kathryn Bigelow's The Hurt Locker (2009), Oren Moverman's The Messenger (2009) and Green Zone (2010) written by Brian Helgeland and directed by Paul Greengrass, where focus was almost entirely on the psychological experiences of military personnel, continuing "Rarely do we ever catch a glimpse of the locals, whom we are supposed to be helping, unless they are being blown up or used as plot devices to heighten the suspense." Other critics also pointed to differences between "Born Free" and Bigelow's The Hurt Locker but similarities between the video and Peter Watkins' Punishment Park (1971).

Salon described "Born Free" as the most violent music video made in a long time and called it a nine-minute masterpiece, adding that "M.I.A. has built a career on making music that's as outspoken as it is danceable" and described the video as "undeniably powerful, a lurid parable on the systematic ethnic cleansing that goes on all over the world." Eric Henderson in Slant stated "what stuck with me is the furious dignity it accords the main tracksuit-wearing prisoner, and the amount of anger it allows him to deliver....I recognized within him and the band of rock-throwing dissidents that pelt the armored bus a sense of kinship relevant to anyone who occupies a minority class." While he felt that "the clip is but a metaphor, and not entirely successfully so, when the pitbull-faced, tenement-snatched redhead boy is slammed against an iron fence and still dares to glare into the eyes of his attackers, I want to be right there by his side fucking their shit up."

== Aftermath ==
RT America (a Russian television network) producer Lucy Kafanov noted how several mainstream American TV news networks hesitated in covering the reaction to the video initially despite the widespread response. She said this was in contrast to their coverage of the controversy of Erykah Badu's "Window Seat" video two weeks prior, and suggested this was because the video for "Born Free" "hit too close to home" in the United States. Billboard writer Monica Herrera stated that anyone who was "up in arms" over Badu's video would probably feel "ridiculous" after watching the video for "Born Free". Journalist Alyona Minkovski of The Alyona Show noted how M.I.A.'s own experiences with genocide in Sri Lanka contributed to the themes in the video but that the silence of the artist left audience members to speculate on several connections between the video and real events. Iraqi rapper Narcy, Palestinian hip hop group DAM and singer Sabreena Da Witch told MTV Iggy that they saw the video as a "grander metaphor for society" and persecution in areas of political turmoil.

The British network Sky News reported that Sherry Adhami, spokeswoman for the UK Beatbullying charity found the video "inappropriate" as it could "lead to more abuse against red-haired people." Caroline Sullivan of The Guardian told the network "I think M.I.A. is making the point that if we segregated all ginger people as a minority - in the same way as black and Asian people - there would be an enormous outcry, and that we don't seem to get the same reaction when black people are treated in this way." She also stated that M.I.A. depicted violence in order to make a political point, in a way different from gangsta rap. Hamrick was to be prominently featured in the video for "Waka Waka (This Time for Africa)" by Shakira and Freshlyground, the official 2010 FIFA World Cup anthem but his appearance was allegedly recut to a crowd scene following the "Born Free" video release. "Waka Waka"'s producers responded that Hamrick was always meant to be an extra in the video and that this was not due to the controversy. Hamrick said of "Born Free" that he was really "proud to be a part of M.I.A.'s shout-out to the world" because "it was a great chance to tell everyone that bully’s [sic] suck no matter what country you are from."

Gavras was more reassured that audiences talked about the subject by themselves, than explaining the video himself as the debate over the video heightened, although he questioned "How can you be shocked by the M.I.A. video and not shocked when Israel bombs Gaza for days and days...Really crazy stuff where people actually die, real things." Vincent Cassel, star of Gavras' film Our Day Will Come, stated he found the video "scary, shocking and totally crazy" on the first viewing, and added "If it would have been with any kind of community it would have been terrible, but suddenly it's redheads, so it's like a symbol of a quest that doesn't really exist." Thus the video also seemed "strange and funny" to him.

M.I.A. stated in an interview to MTV News that she found the reaction to the film "fascinating" but that she was baffled by the media's fixation on the clip when real issues were ignored, stating "I think it's interesting how we react to fiction and how we react to realism on the internet... this is mainstream media, I wish I was talking about way more underground theories, but [I'm] not, this is just me digesting what I see in the mainstream." She joked to NME that she found the new Justin Bieber video "more of an assault to my eyes and senses than what I've made". A few weeks later, in an interview with Angie Martinez of Hot 97 radio station in New York City, she said "I said I love Justin Bieber and everyone like went crazy. It's weird. No, I said that I found his video offensive, because people said they found my video offensive [...] It got out of hand, Now I feel really bad coz I have some family members who love Justin Bieber, and now they won't talk to me, I need my little cousins to talk to me!"

A week after its release on Vimeo on 26 April, the video was viewed 1.8 million times on the site. From 27 April to 2 May, M.I.A. remained the most blogged about artist on the internet, according to MP3 blog aggregator The Hype Machine. The video was then re-posted on YouTube by VEVO, without users having to sign in to prove they were 18 or older. The raw video is also on M.I.A.'s website. The video has been viewed over 30 million times on the internet.

== YouTube controversy and response ==
Video sharing website YouTube removed the film from viewing in the United States within a day of its posting. Some other uploads of the video were subsequently age-gated on the site, while others were removed due to copyright claims. YouTube stated that they did not comment on individual clips on the site but said that videos were removed only after users reported videos that could "contravene guidelines." Commentators proposed different reasons for the actions, from the graphic "excessive" violence depicted to political censorship. On 27 April, the BBC reported that the video was being removed in some instances by YouTube, and labelled with an age-restriction in others. Neither M.I.A. or her record label XL Recordings commented on the development in the weeks following the release. Lisa Respers France wrote in CNN that the YouTube block may have worked in M.I.A.'s favor as it brought more publicity. M.I.A. tweeted she initially suspected her US parent label Universal Music Group to be responsible but confirmed it was not soon after. The singer-rapper stated that she found YouTube's action on the video "ridiculous", citing YouTube's streaming of real-life killings. Miranda Sawyer of The Observer noted that although the metaphor in the video was obvious, the illustration was graphic and "some might say gratuitous". M.I.A. told Sawyer "It's just fake blood and ketchup and people are more offended by that more than the execution videos" referring to the clips of Sri Lankan troops shooting unarmed, blindfolded, naked men in the head that she tweeted beforehand, later telling French music magazine Mondomix "It’s amazing to me that is the state we're in today – people are more moved by something synthetic than something real. And as an artist that’s the decision you have to make – whether to be real or synthetic." Similarly, Erin Thomson of Seattle Weekly concurred that the violence in the video was not gratuitous, noting that as an artist, M.I.A. "never pretended to be anything less than radical; she's never shied away from shock value. She comes from a world where persecution and terrorism are the norm, and from day one that's been the world she's tried to portray through her music."

Xinhua, the official news agency of the Chinese government noted the removal of the film on American YouTube within a week of Born Free's release. M.I.A. condemned the Chinese Government's role in supporting and supplying arms to the Sri Lankan government during Eelam War IV, stating that China's influence within the UN was preventing prosecutions of war crimes committed during the conflict.
