= Tell Me Why (M.I.A. song) =

Single by M.I.A.

from the album Maya
- Released: 6 July 2010
- Recorded: 10 November 2009
- Genre: Avant-pop; industrial
- Length: 4:10
- Label: N.E.E.T.; XL; Interscope
- Songwriters: Maya Arulpragasam; Thomas Pentz
- Producer: Diplo

M.I.A. singles chronology
"Teqkilla" (2010)	"Tell Me Why" (2010)	"It Takes a Muscle" (2010)

"Tell Me Why" is a song by British recording artist M.I.A. from her third studio album, Maya (2010). It was written by Maya "M.I.A." Arulpragasam, and Diplo, and production was handled by the latter. The song was recorded at Red Bull Studios in Santa Monica, California on Diplo's birthday in 2009. The producer admitted that "Tell Me Why" is his favorite song on the album, likening the track's sound to Wall of Sound and Motown. The song incorporates elements of Sarah Lancaster's "The Last Words of Copernicus" as performed by the Alabama Sacred Harp Singers and recorded by Alan Lomax in 1959. It was released worldwide as a digital download, under license to XL Recordings and N.E.E.T. Recordings, on 6 July 2010, as the fifth single from the album. No music video was made for the single, and M.I.A. has never performed it live.

== Critical reception ==
The track was met with mixed reviews from music critics. While some called it an "absolute beauty" with a "super slick" production, others were very critical towards the use of Auto-Tune. Rap-Up and AllMusic picked the song as one of their highlights on the album.

== Track listing ==
Digital download

1. "Tell Me Why" – 4:10

== Release history ==
Region	Date	Format	Label
Worldwide	6 July 2010	Digital download, streaming	XL Recordings, N.E.E.T. Recordings
