= Butler, Freestone County, Texas =

Unincorporated community in Texas, US

Coordinates: 31.6637°N 95.9235°W

Butler is a historic, unincorporated community in Freestone County, Texas, United States. The community is southeast of Fairfield and approximately 14 miles outside city limits on U.S. Route 84.

== Demographics ==
The community has a total population of approximately 1,475.

Population in July 2007: Males: 733 (49.7%), Females: 742 (50.3%)

Racial Group Representation:

- White alone - 760 (54.1%),
- Black alone - 572 (40.7%),
- Hispanic - 54 (3.8%),
- Two or more races - 14 (1.0%),
- American alone - 3 (0.2%),
- Asian alone - 1 (0.07%)

The average household size is 2.4 people and roughly 57% of the community is a family household, which is well below the state average. Parts of the community are fairly poor with 15% of residents earning income below the poverty level.

== Schools ==
Butler is served by the Fairfield Independent School District which includes Fairfield Elementary school, Fairfield Intermediate school, and Fairfield High School.

Higher education options include Trinity Valley Community College (38 miles), Navarro College (42 miles), UT Tyler (63 miles), Texas State Technical College (67 miles), Tyler Junior College (69 miles), Sam Houston State University (70 miles), and Texas A&M (73 miles).

== Landmarks ==
The nearest hospitals are in Fairfield, TX and Palestine, TX 14 miles and 21 miles away respectively.

Notable sites in Butler include its many churches, historic cemeteries, lakes and reservoirs, as well as the numerous springs and creeks.

== History ==
In the early 1850s, several prominent families from Butler County, Alabama, settled in area known a West Point Hill. Over time the settlement grew with the addition of a church in 1854 and the establishment of a post office in 1856. By 1858 the community had a doctor, a general store, several businesses, and a Masonic lodge. The major revenue of the town at that time was from cotton, which was shipped through Galveston by steamboat on the Trinity River. In 1872 the International-Great Northern Railroad attempted to build a line through the town, but an agreement with landowners could not be reached. The railroad instead went through Oakwood and Palestine. In 1880 the population of Butler was 300, but by 1892 it had decreased to 150, primarily due to the lack of a railroad and the decline in steamboat traffic. In 1916, the post office was closed and all mail was sent through the office in Oakwood. By 1969, all schools had been consolidated in Fairfield.

Sacred Harp composer Sarah Lancaster lived in Butler for some time with her family.
