= Maya (M.I.A. album) =

2010 studio album by M.I.A.

Studio album by M.I.A.
- Released: 7 July 2010
- Recorded: 2009–2010
- Genres: Avant-pop; hip hop; dance; industrial
- Length: 41:39
- Labels: N.E.E.T.; XL; Interscope
- Producers: Sugu Arulpragasam; Blaqstarr; Diplo; John Hill; Derek E. Miller; M.I.A.; Rusko; Switch

M.I.A. chronology
Kala (2007)	Maya (2010)	Vicki Leekx (2010)

Singles from Maya
- 1. "Born Free" Released: 23 April 2010; 2. "XXXO" Released: 11 May 2010; 3. "Steppin Up" Released: 16 June 2010; 4. "Teqkilla" Released: 29 June 2010; 5. "Tell Me Why" Released: 6 July 2010; 6. "It Takes a Muscle" Released: 20 December 2010; 7. "Internet Connection" Released: 11 January 2011

Maya (stylised in all caps; or as ΛΛ Λ Y Λ and /\/\ /\ Y /\) is the third studio album by British recording artist M.I.A. It was released on 7 July 2010 through N.E.E.T. Recordings, XL and Interscope. Songwriting and production was primarily handled by M.I.A., Blaqstarr and Rusko. Producers Diplo and Switch, alongside M.I.A.'s brother Sugu, also worked on the album. Maya was mainly composed and recorded at M.I.A.'s house in Los Angeles. The album's tracks centre on the theme of information politics and are intended to evoke what M.I.A. called a "digital ruckus"; elements of industrial music were incorporated into M.I.A.'s sound for the first time upon its release. A deluxe edition was released simultaneously, featuring four new tracks.

Upon its release, Maya received mixed to positive reviews from music critics, with the album's musical style and lyrical content attracting both praise and criticism. In its first week of release, the album entered the UK Albums Chart at number 21, becoming her highest-charting album in the UK. It also became her highest-charting album in the US, peaking at number nine on the Billboard 200. Elsewhere, the album debuted in the top 10 in Finland, Norway, Greece and Canada.

To promote the album, M.I.A. released multiple tracks online, including "XXXO", "It Takes a Muscle" and "Born Free". The latter was accompanied by a short film-music video, which generated controversy due to its graphic imagery. She also performed at music festivals in the US and Europe to coincide with the album release. During promotion of the album, M.I.A. became embroiled in a dispute with Lynn Hirschberg of The New York Times.

== Composition and recording ==
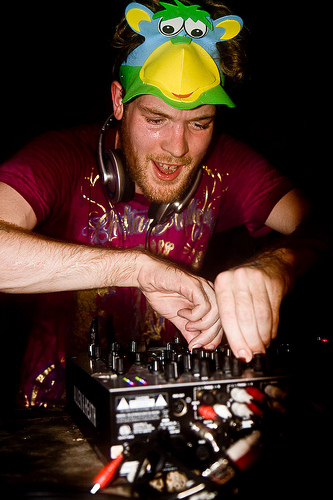
English producer Rusko was one of M.I.A.'s collaborators on the album

English-Tamil musician M.I.A. (Mathangi "Maya" Arulpragasam) released her second album Kala in 2007, which achieved widespread critical acclaim, and was certified gold in the United States and silver in the United Kingdom. Six months after giving birth to her son Ikyhd in February 2009, she began composing and recording her third studio album in a home studio section of the Los Angeles house she had bought with her partner Ben Bronfman. She used instruments such as the portable dynamic-phrase synthesizer Korg Kaossilator to compose. She took the beat machine and began recording atop Mayan pyramids in Mexico. Much of the work on the album was undertaken at her house in Los Angeles, in what she called a "commune environment", before it was completed in a rented studio in Hawaii. She collaborated with writer-producer Blaqstarr because, in her opinion, "he simply makes good music". M.I.A.'s collaboration with Derek E. Miller of Sleigh Bells on the track "Meds and Feds" prompted her subsequent signing of the band to her label N.E.E.T., and according to Miller, this experience gave him the confidence to record the band's debut album Treats.

Her creative partnership with the relatively unknown Rusko grew from a sense of frustration at what she saw as her now more mainstream associates suggesting sub-standard tracks due to their busy schedules. Diplo worked on the track "Tell Me Why", but at a studio in Santa Monica, California, rather than at the house. He claimed in an interview that, following the break-up of his personal relationship with M.I.A. some years earlier, he was not allowed to visit the house because "her boyfriend really hates me".

Tracks for the album were whittled down from recording sessions lasting up to 30 hours. Producer Rusko, who played guitar and piano on the album, described the pair getting "carried away" in the studio, appreciating the "mad distorted and hectic" sound they were able to create. Rusko said "She's got a kid, a little one year old baby, and we recorded his heart beat. We'd just think of crazy ideas". Rusko has described M.I.A. as the best artist he has ever worked with, saying that she had "been the most creative and I really had a good time making music with her".

== Music and lyrics ==
M.I.A. called the new project "schizophrenic", and spoke of the Internet inspiration that could be found in the songs and the artwork. She also said that the album centred on her "not being able to leave [Los Angeles] for 18 months" and feeling "disconnected". She summed up the album's main theme as information politics. During the recording of the album, she spoke of the combined effects that news corporations and Google have on news and data collection, while stressing the need for alternative news sources that she felt her son's generation would need to ascertain truth. Maya was made to be "so uncomfortably weird and wrong that people begin to exercise their critical-thinking muscles". M.I.A. said "You can Google 'Sri Lanka' and it doesn't come up that all these people have been murdered or bombed, it's 'Come to Sri Lanka on vacation, there are beautiful beaches' ... you're not gonna get the truth till you hit like, page 56, and it's my and your responsibility to pass on the information that it's not easy anymore". Following these comments, M.I.A. received death threats directed at her and her son, which she also cited as an influence on the songs on the album. She summed up the album as a mixture of "babies, death, destruction and powerlessness". The singer revealed that going into recording the album, she had still not accepted that she was a musician, saying, "I'm still in denial, listening to too much Destiny's Child". With Maya, she stated "I was happy being the retarded cousin of rap... Now I'm the retarded cousin of singing."

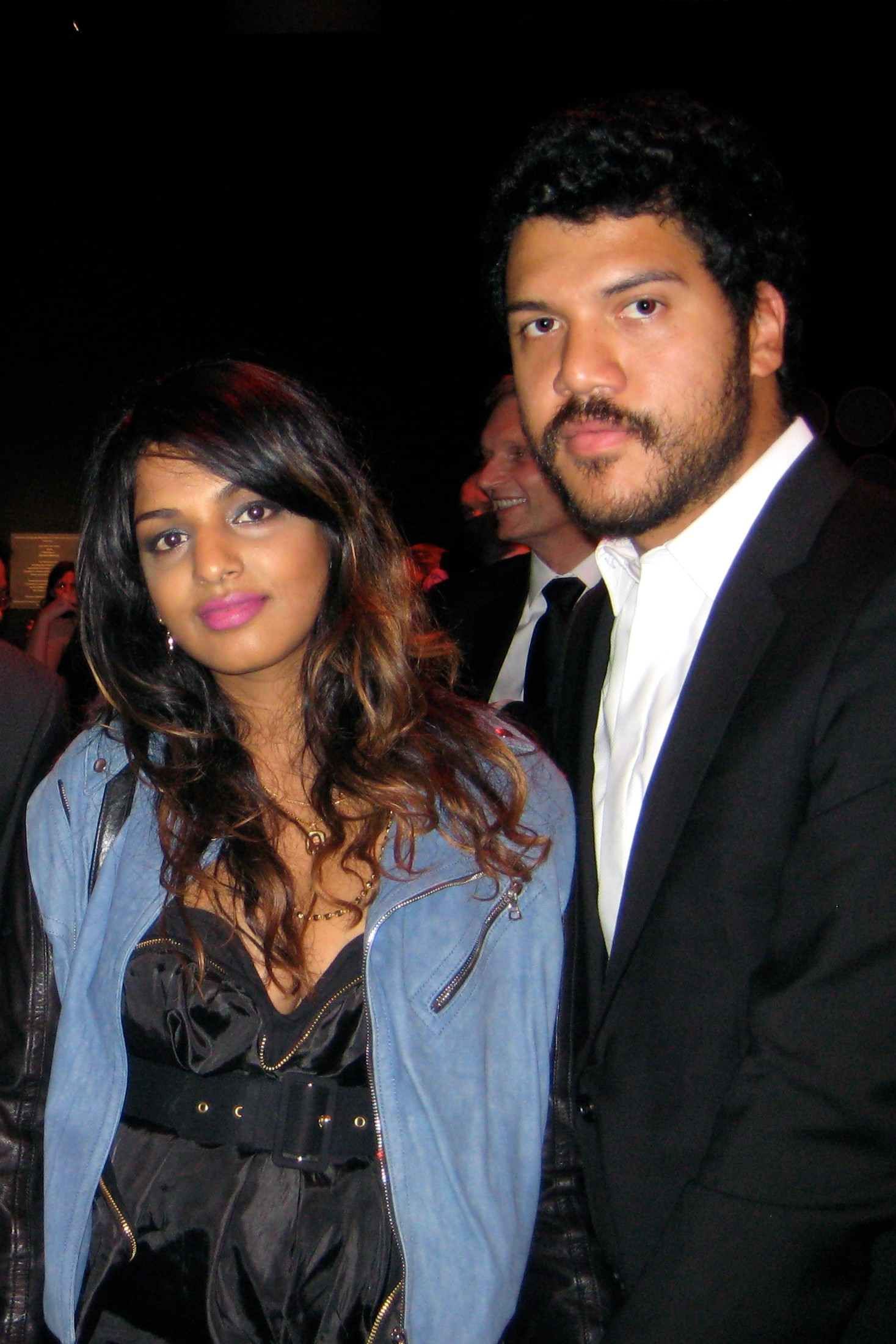
M.I.A. with ex-partner Ben Bronfman

M.I.A. opted to sing, as opposed to rap, on several tracks on the album, telling Rolling Stone in early 2010 that she wished to produce something different from her previous album, which had "more emphasis on production". In a January 2010 interview with NME she spoke of being inspired by the film Food, Inc. and described the album as being about "exploring our faults and flaws" and being proud of them. The closing track, "Space", which was reportedly recorded using an iPhone app, is a ballad which Mikael Wood, writing in Billboard, described as "dreamy" and "sound[ing] like a Sega Genesis practicing its pillow talk". In contrast, Greg Kot of the Chicago Tribune described "Lovalot" as sounding "like it was recorded in a dank alley, the singer's voice reverberating amid percussion that sounds like doors creaking and rats scurrying across garbage cans". "XXXO" draws its inspiration from M.I.A.'s "cheesy pop side", and is based on the theme of the creation of a sex symbol. "Teqkilla" is the only track to address her relationship with Bronfman, through a reference to Seagram, the company owned by his family. "It Takes a Muscle" is a cover version of a track originally recorded in 1982 by Dutch group Spectral Display, and is performed in a reggae style.

The opening track "The Message", featuring a male lead vocalist, parodies the words of the traditional song "Dem Bones" to link Google to "the government". Kitty Empire wrote in The Observer that these conspiratorial government connections to Google and the thoughts of Dzhennet Abdurakhmanova, the Russian teenager who bombed Moscow's tube system in revenge for the death of her husband, were inner-world issues pondered in "Lovalot" with "a mixture of nonsense rhyme, militant posturing and pop-cultural free-flow; her London glottal stop mischievously turns 'I love a lot' into 'I love Allah' ". Ann Powers in the Los Angeles Times said that "M.I.A. turns a call to action into a scared girl's nervous tic. Synths click out a jittery, jagged background. The song doesn't justify anything, but it reminds us that there is a person behind every lit fuse". Powers also commented on how "Born Free" mixed the boasting style often found in hip hop music with lines depicting the lives of those enduring poverty and persecution. "Illygirl", a track found only on the deluxe edition of the album, is written from the point of view of an abused but tough teenager, whom critic Robert Christgau said could be the "kid-sister-in-metaphor" of the swaggering persona adopted by M.I.A. on the track "Steppin Up".

Samples used on the album were taken from artists as diverse as the electronic duo Suicide and gospel choir the Alabama Sacred Harp Singers. "Internet Connection", one of four bonus tracks on the deluxe edition of the album, was recorded in collaboration with a group of Filipino Verizon workers. M.I.A. described the sound and imagery of the album as capturing a "digital ruckus", adding that "so many of us have become typists and voyeurs". We need a digital moshpit like we've never seen, harder than how people were doing it in the punk era. We need that energy, but digitally". M.I.A. herself picked out "Steppin Up", "Space" and "Teqkilla" as her favourite tracks on the album. She said that she contemplated using only the sound of drills as the backing for "Steppin Up", but concluded that this was "too experimental" an approach.

According to Jim Farber of New York Daily News, Maya is an avant-pop album that takes influence from "the most maddeningly catchy bits of electro-clash, hip-hop, Bollywood, dub and dance music". Farber also noted the significant industrial rock influence on the album, likening it to "the late-'80s work of Ministry". Julianne Escobedo Shepherd of The Fader commented on the increasingly industrial feel of the tracks made available prior to the album's release, a style which had not previously been incorporated into her music. On a similar note, Michael Saba of Paste believed the album was "a collection of sparse, industrial-influenced tracks that sound more like post-apocalyptic Nine Inch Nails than Arulpragasam’s trademark realpolitik rap".

== Release and artwork ==
The album was originally set to be released on 29 June 2010, but in May M.I.A.'s record label announced a new release date of 13 July. In late April, the artist posted a twitpic of the track listing for the new album. She also commented that at the time she was "open to suggestions" regarding the album's title. Two weeks later, a blog posting on her record label's official website revealed that the album would be entitled /\/\/\Y/\, which spells out M.I.A.'s own forename, Maya, in leetspeak. The title follows on from previous albums named after her father (2005's Arular) and mother (2007's Kala). Some reviewers used the stylised title while others did not. M.I.A.'s official Myspace page uses both titles. The album was released in conventional physical and digital formats and as an iTunes LP.

The album's cover features the singer's face almost completely hidden by YouTube player bars. MTV's Kyle Anderson described the cover, which was previewed in June 2010, as "a typically busy, trippy, disorienting piece of art" and speculated that it might be "a statement about 21st century privacy". Additional art direction for the album was provided by Aaron Parsons. M.I.A. used her mother's Tamil phonebook to find a wedding photographer to provide images for the album. Photographers for the album were Ravi Thiagaraja, M.I.A. and Jamie Martinez. Elements of the artwork had previously been used in one of a series of billboard images, all designed by musicians, which were projected onto landmarks in London by a guerrilla project called BillBored during the 2010 British general election. The deluxe edition of the album features a lenticular slipcase. Music website Prefix listed it as one of the 10 worst album covers of 2010, likening it to a "child's first computer-class-assignment".

When questioned about the difficulty of finding her album title on search engines such as Google, she noted that she chose to use forward slashes and backward slashes due to their ease at being typed and because she liked the way the album title looked on music players such as iTunes. She also suggested that it was a deliberate attempt to avoid detection by internet search engines. The Guardian's Sian Rowe commented that M.I.A.'s deliberate "shrinking away from a mainstream audience" by the use of difficult, unsearchable symbols was part of a growing new underground scene perhaps trying to create a "generation gap", where only "the youngest and the most enthusiastic" would seek out such band names by reading the right online sources.

== Promotion ==
On 12 January 2010, M.I.A. posted a video clip on Twitter, which featured a new song, but revealed no information about it other than the heading "Theres space for ol dat I see" (sic). The following day her publicist confirmed that the track was entitled "Space Odyssey" and had been produced in collaboration with Rusko to protest a travel piece about Sri Lanka printed in The New York Times. The track made it onto the final album under the revised title "Space". The same month, she filmed a short film for the song "Born Free". At the end of April the track was released as a promotional single, and the short film accompanying the song was released. The film, directed by Romain Gavras, depicts a military unit rounding up red-headed young men who are then shot or forced to run across a minefield. The film, which also features nudity and scenes of drug use, caused widespread controversy and was either removed or labelled with an age restriction on YouTube. In the weeks following the release of the film, M.I.A. was the most blogged about artist on the Internet, according to MP3 blog aggregator The Hype Machine. M.I.A. found the controversy "ridiculous", saying that videos of real-life executions had not generated as much controversy as her video. In the run-up to the album's release, "XXXO", which Entertainment Weekly described as the "first official single" from the forthcoming album, "Steppin Up", "Teqkilla" and "It Takes a Muscle" were released online. On 6 July 2010 she made the entire album available via her Myspace page. On 20 September, "Story To Be Told" received a video, on its own website, featuring the song's lyrics in CAPTCHA formatting. In December, "It Takes a Muscle" was released as a two-track promotional single.

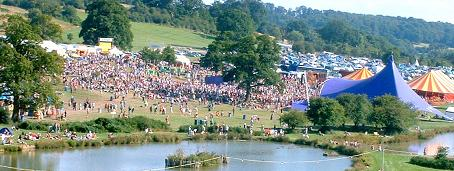
M.I.A. promoted the album with a performance at The Big Chill in August 2010

The new album was publicised during Jay-Z's performance at the Coachella Valley Music and Arts Festival in April, when a blimp flew across the venue announcing that M.I.A.'s new album would be released on 29 June 2010. M.I.A. promoted the album with a series of appearances at music festivals, including the Hard festival in New York and The Big Chill in Herefordshire. Her performance at the latter was cut short due to a stage invasion by fans. She also performed at the Flow Festival in Finland, where she was joined onstage by Derek E. Miller playing guitar during her performance of "Meds and Feds", and the Lokerse Feesten in Lokeren, Flanders, Belgium, where her performance drew a crowd of 13,500, the biggest of the 10-day music festival. In September she announced a tour that would last until the end of the year.

M.I.A. also promoted the album with an appearance on the "Late Show with David Letterman", during which she performed "Born Free" with Martin Rev of Suicide playing keyboards, backed by a group of dancers styled to look like M.I.A. In November 2010 she appeared on the British television show Later... with Jools Holland, performing "Born Free" and "It Takes a Muscle", the latter with members of The Specials. While promoting the album, M.I.A. became involved in a dispute with Lynn Hirschberg of The New York Times, who interviewed her in March 2010 and whose resulting article portrayed the singer as pretentious and attention seeking. In response, M.I.A. posted Hirschberg's telephone number on her Twitter page and later uploaded her own audio recording of the interview, highlighting the discrepancies between what she said and what was reported. The piece was criticised for its yellow journalism by some, however M.I.A. received varying degrees of support and criticism for the ensuing fallout from the media. Benjamin Boles wrote in Now that, while Hirschberg's piece came across as a "vicious ... character assassination", M.I.A's subsequent actions were "childish" and made her "the laughing stock of the internet". The paper later printed a correction on the story, acknowledging that some quotes had been taken out of context. The incident prompted Boots Riley of the band Street Sweeper Social Club to comment on how artists had access to media that allowed writers to be held accountable and that M.I.A.'s move was "brilliant".

== Critical reception ==
Professional ratings
Aggregate scores
Source	Rating
AnyDecentMusic?	7.1/10
Metacritic	68/100
Review scores
Source	Rating
AllMusic	3/5 stars
Entertainment Weekly	C−
The Guardian	3/5 stars
The Independent	4/5 stars
Los Angeles Times	3.5/4 stars
MSN Music (Expert Witness)	A
NME	7/10
Pitchfork	4.4/10
Rolling Stone	4/5 stars
Spin	9/10

Maya received moderately positive reviews from critics. At Metacritic, which assigns a normalised rating out of 100 based on reviews from mainstream critics, the album received an average score of 68 based on 41 reviews, which indicates "generally favorable reviews". Reviews of the album began to appear a month before its release after the album leaked in low quality onto the internet.

Simon Vozick-Levinson of Entertainment Weekly called the album "surely the year's most divisive major-label release". Charles Aaron, writing in Spin, gave the album four and a half out of five stars, his review deeming the song "Lovalot" her "riskiest gambit yet". Matthew Bennett of Clash gave a similar score, calling it a "towering work". Mojo writer Roy Wilkinson called it a "startling fusillade of to-the-moon pop music". Writing for the BBC Online, Matthew Bennett characterised the album as "loud, proud, and taking no prisoners" and also praised the album's lighter tracks, such as "Teqkilla", which he called "enjoyably demented but utterly catchy". Rolling Stone writer Rob Sheffield said the album was M.I.A.'s "most aggressive, confrontational and passionate yet", praising her "voracious ear for alarms, sirens, explosions, turning every jolt into a breakbeat" and her consequent lyrics as "expansive". Los Angeles Times writer Ann Powers commended the album as "an attempt by an artist who's defined herself through opposition to engage with the system that she has entered, for better or worse, and to still remain recognizable to herself" characterising Maya's foregrounded ideas as "a struggle worthy of a revolutionary". In his consumer guide for MSN Music, critic Robert Christgau gave the album an A rating and complimented its "beats and the spunky, shape-shifting, stubbornly political, nouveau riche bundle of nerves who holds them together".

Other critics were not as complimentary towards the album. Charlotte Heathcote of British newspaper the Daily Express said that, while M.I.A. could "still lay claim to being one of our most imaginative, uncompromising artists", there were "only glimmers of brilliance" on the album. Chicago Tribune writer Greg Kot gave the album two and a half out of four stars and expressed a mixed response towards M.I.A.'s "[embracing] pop more fervently than ever. Entertainment Weekly's Leah Greenblatt was critical of the album, stating that it sounded "murky and almost punishingly discordant, as if the album has been submerged underwater and then set upon by an arsenal of exceptionally peeved power tools". She went on to state that nothing on the album sounded "truly vital", or as revolutionary as M.I.A. wanted the public to believe. Stephen Troussé, writing in Uncut, described the album as "anticlimactic" and "self-satisfied" and said that it suffered from "diminished horizons". Mehan Jayasuriya of PopMatters noted M.I.A.'s "self-aggrandizing" as a weakness, adding that Maya lacks "the focus and confidence of M.I.A.'s previous albums". Jesse Cataldo of Slant Magazine noted that the album "has the feel of a vanity project" and wrote "It may be an above-average album, but its aesthetic matches her persona only at its shallowest levels, in the thinness of its ideas and the often-forceful ugliness of its message". Chris Richard of The Washington Post called it "a disorienting mix of industrial clatter and digital slush" and noted "there isn't much to sing along to".

=== Accolades ===
In December 2010, NME named "XXXO" and "Born Free" the number two and number 11 best tracks of the year respectively. Maya appeared in a number of magazines' lists of the best albums of the year. The album was placed at number five on the "2010 Pitchfork Readers Poll" list of the "Most Underrated Album" of the year. Spin placed Maya at number eight in its list of the best releases of 2010, and Rolling Stone listed it at number 19 in its countdown.

=== Legacy ===
In 2013, in light of recently leaked NSA documents that revealed the agency had been surveilling US citizens' internet use through Google and Facebook, M.I.A. made a Tumblr post saying she had correctly predicted this sort of spying in her song "The Message". Carrie Battan of Pitchfork noted that the then-widespread "criticisms of M.I.A.'s politically charged words and alleged paranoia" could now "seem just as silly as her lyrics once might have". On Maya's tenth anniversary, journalists opined that the album's "internet aversion and overstuffed sound" aged well and could be considered a precursor to the industrial distortion of albums like Yeezus (2013) by Kanye West.

== Commercial performance ==
Maya debuted at number 21 on the UK Albums Chart on first-week sales of 7,138 copies, 18 places higher than the peak position achieved by Kala, immediately making it M.I.A.'s highest-charting album in the UK. The following week it dropped out of the top 40. It also charted in a number of other European countries, reaching the top 10 in Finland, Greece and Norway. In the United States, it debuted at number nine on the Billboard 200, nine places higher than the peak position achieved by Kala, although it sold only 28,000 copies in its first week of release, compared with the 29,000 which the earlier album sold in the same period. Maya fell to number 34 in its second week on the chart, selling 11,000 copies. As of September 2013, the album had sold 99,000 copies in the US. The album also topped Billboard's Dance/Electronic Albums chart and reached the top five on two of the magazine's other charts. Maya also entered the top 10 on the Canadian Albums Chart. The single "XXXO" reached the top 40 in Spain and the UK, and "Teqkilla" reached number 93 on the Canadian Hot 100 on digital downloads alone.

== Track listing ==
No.	Title	Writer(s)	Producer(s)	Length
1.	"The Message"	Sugu Arulpragasam; Steve Loveridge	S. Arulpragasam	0:57
2.	"Steppin Up"	Maya Arulpragasam; Christopher Mercer; Dave Taylor	Rusko	4:01
3.	"XXXO"	M. Arulpragasam; Charles Smith; Cherry Byron-Withers	Blaqstarr; Rusko	2:54
4.	"Teqkilla"	M. Arulpragasam; Mercer; Taylor; John Hill; Byron-Withers	Rusko; M.I.A.; Switch; Hill	6:20
5.	"Lovalot"	M. Arulpragasam; Taylor; Hill; Opal Josephs; Sheldon Pennicot; Sekou Davis	M.I.A.; Switch; Hill	2:50
6.	"Story to Be Told"	M. Arulpragasam; Mercer; Taylor	Rusko; M.I.A.	3:32
7.	"It Takes a Muscle"	Michael Mulders; Henri Overduin	Diplo	3:00
8.	"It Iz What It Iz"	M. Arulpragasam; Smith	Blaqstarr	3:29
9.	"Born Free"	M. Arulpragasam; Taylor; Martin Rev; Alan Vega	Switch; M.I.A.	4:07
10.	"Meds and Feds"	M. Arulpragasam; Derek E. Miller	M.I.A.; Miller	3:09
11.	"Tell Me Why"	M. Arulpragasam; Wesley Pentz	Diplo	4:11
12.	"Space"	M. Arulpragasam; Mercer	Rusko; M.I.A.	3:08

Japanese and deluxe edition bonus tracks
No.	Title	Writer(s)	Producer(s)	Length
13.	"Internet Connection"	M. Arulpragasam; Smith	M.I.A.; Blaqstarr	2:49
14.	"Illygirl"	M. Arulpragasam; Smith	M.I.A.; Blaqstarr	2:14
15.	"Believer"	M. Arulpragasam; Smith	M.I.A.; Switch	3:11
16.	"Caps Lock"	M. Arulpragasam; Smith	Blaqstarr	3:58

=== Notes ===
- All track titles are stylized in all caps.
- "Lovalot" incorporates elements of "I Said It" by Opal.
- "It Takes a Muscle" is a cover of "It Takes a Muscle to Fall in Love" by Spectral Display.
- "Born Free" contains a sample from "Ghost Rider" by Suicide.
- "Tell Me Why" incorporates elements of "The Last Words of Copernicus" by the Alabama Sacred Harp Singers.
- "Internet Connection" incorporates a sample from Fonejacker.

== Personnel ==
Credits adapted from the liner notes of the deluxe edition of Maya.

- Maya Arulpragasam – mixing (tracks 1, 5, 12, 15); production (tracks 4–6, 9, 10, 12–15); art direction, creative direction, executive producer, photography
- Ben H. Allen – mixing (tracks 3, 11)
- Sugu Arulpragasam – production (track 1)
- Blaqstarr – production (tracks 3, 8, 13, 14, 16); mixing (tracks 13, 14, 16)
- Diplo – production (tracks 7, 11)
- Robert Gardner – mix assistance (tracks 3, 11)
- John Hill – production (tracks 4, 5)
- Jaime Martínez – photography
- Derek E. Miller – mixing, production (track 10)
- Aaron Parsons – art direction
- Neal Pogue – mixing (track 2)
- Rusko – production (tracks 2–4, 6, 12)
- Shane P. Stoneback – mixing (track 10)
- Switch – mixing (track 2); production (tracks 4, 5, 9); vocal production (track 15)
- Ravi Thiagaraja – photography

== Charts ==
=== Weekly charts ===
Chart (2010)	Peak position
Australian Albums (ARIA)	21
Australian Urban Albums (ARIA)	2
Austrian Albums (Ö3 Austria)	53
Belgian Albums (Ultratop Flanders)	20
Belgian Albums (Ultratop Wallonia)	48
Canadian Albums (Billboard)	7
Danish Albums (Hitlisten)	17
Dutch Albums (Album Top 100)	93
European Albums (Billboard)	31
Finnish Albums (Suomen virallinen lista)	9
French Albums (SNEP)	79
German Albums (Offizielle Top 100)	48
Greek International Albums (IFPI)	10
Irish Albums (IRMA)	47
Irish Independent Albums (IRMA)	5
Japanese Albums (Oricon)	37
New Zealand Albums (RMNZ)	21
Norwegian Albums (VG-lista)	8
Scottish Albums (Official Charts)	32
Swedish Albums (Sverigetopplistan)	31
Swiss Albums (Schweizer Hitparade)	27
UK Albums (Official Charts)	21
UK Independent Albums (Official Charts)	2
UK R&B Albums (Official Charts)	6
US Billboard 200	9
US Top Dance Albums (Billboard)	1

=== Monthly charts ===
Chart (2010)	Peak position
Polish Monthly Albums (ZPAV)	72

=== Year-end charts ===
Chart (2010)	Position
Australian Urban Albums (ARIA)	45
US Top Dance/Electronic Albums (Billboard)	12

== Release history ==
Region	Date	Edition	Label	Ref.
Japan	7 July 2010	Limited	Hostess	
Australia	9 July 2010	Standard; deluxe	XL	
Germany	9 July 2010	Standard; limited	XL	
Ireland	9 July 2010	Standard	XL	
France	12 July 2010	Standard; deluxe	XL	
United Kingdom	12 July 2010	Standard	XL	
United States	13 July 2010	Standard; deluxe	N.E.E.T.; XL; Interscope	
