= Maya Tour =

2010–11 concert tour by M.I.A.

- Tour by M.I.A.
- Associated album: Maya (2010)
- Start date: 21 September 2010
- No. of shows: 16 in North America; 28 in Europe; 8 in Australia; 2 in Japan in total

M.I.A. concert chronology
- People vs. Money Tour (2008); Maya Tour (2010)

The Maya Tour (stylized as /\/\ /\ Y /\ Tour) is a 2010 global M.I.A. concert tour performed in support of her third studio album Maya (see 2010 in music). It began on 21 September 2010 in North America and was M.I.A.'s first major global performing tour since the birth of her first child. The tour was announced on 8 September 2010, with dates for Canadian, American and European venues revealed. According to photo albums on the musician's official Facebook page, the North American leg was branded the Reboot/Reboost Tour 2010, while the Sexynsofistic8d Tour formed the European leg of her 2010 concerts. M.I.A. handled costumes and stage direction, which departed from the productions of the preceding 2007–2008 Kala Tour and People Vs. Money Tours.

While on tour, her performance at the Lokerse Feesten in Lokeren, Flanders, Belgium drew a crowd of 13,500, the biggest of the 10-day music festival. Her performance at The Big Chill in Herefordshire, England was cut short due to a massive stage invasion by fans, while her performance at Hard Festival in New York was received negatively. She performed a show free to New York fans in light of the reaction. In Portugal performing at Festival Sudoeste, she revealed her intentions to shoot a new music video with director Spike Jonze, although this did not materialize. M.I.A. was joined on stage at the Flow Festival in Finland by Derek Miller of Sleigh Bells. Another N.E.E.T. label signee Rye Rye also opened on selected dates during the tour. The Sexynsofistic8d Tour marked M.I.A.'s second appearance at the Sónar in Barcelona, following her first appearance in 2005's Arular Tour, and saw the musician returning to perform at several venues she had first played during her debut global tour.

In January 2011, following the release of her free mixtape Vicki Leekx in the new year, she returned to the Big Day Out festival, marking M.I.A.'s first visit to New Zealand, and kick starting her Australian dates of the tour. Her costumes and style changed during this leg, having dyed her hair platinum blonde in an apparent tribute to WikiLeaks founder Julian Assange and following on from the name and themes of the mixtape. She cancelled two appearances in the UK in 2010 due to her son's sickness, and in May 2011, posted a TwitPic of her with a broken leg, playing with her son. She tweeted "Doh, scrapin playdoh off robot let brace lookin like the 5th member of black eyed peas right now" before continuing "When u stand up, 1st they break ur moral, then they break ur work, then ur leg, but the beauty in enduring is that u can endure more!" She had cancelled her February 2011 dates in Japan.

The 2010–2011 tour featured a new setlist, featuring new songs from Maya. Included as an opening intro song at venues such as Sónar and the Roskilde Festival in Denmark was an animation video accompanying the Hindu slokam Veṅkaṭeśasuprabhātam (Suprabhatam) composed by Prativādibhayaṅkara Śrī Anantācārya, the Rāmānujācārya of Kanchipuram, to awaken the deity Venkateswara of the Tirumala Venkateswara Temple. The tour ended with her performance at the Exit Festival, Novi Sad in Serbia.

== Tour details ==
=== Background ===
M.I.A. promoted the album with a series of appearances at music festivals, including the Hard festival in New York and The Big Chill in Herefordshire. Her performance at the latter was cut short due to a stage invasion by fans. She also performed at the Flow Festival in Finland, where she was joined onstage by Derek E. Miller playing guitar during her performance of "Meds and Feds", and the LokerseFeesten in Lokeren, Flanders, Belgium, where her performance drew a crowd of 13,500, the biggest of the 10-day music festival. M.I.A. performed at the 2010 Virgin Mobile Festival, Festival Sudoeste, Way Out West Festival, Underage Festival and Øyafestivalen. In September she announced a tour, with Sleigh Bells and Rye Rye as alternating support acts, with the tour lasting until the end of the year.

=== Sets ===
M.I.A. tweeted on 19 Nov "my baby is sick @ home in london i m sorry to my liverpool fans, but ill b in leeds 2maro c u there . watching yo gabba gabba!". Subsequently, this meant her Liverpool show was cancelled.

== Set list ==
- "The Message (Intro)"
- "Illygirl"
- "Bucky Done Gun"
- "XR2"
- "Boyz"
- "World Town"
- "Steppin' Up"
- "Teqkilla"
- "Story To Be Told"
- "Born Free"
- "Bamboo Banga"
- "Galang"
- "Paper Planes"

== Tour dates ==
Date	City	Country	Venue
North America
21 September 2010	Montreal	Canada	Métropolis
22 September 2010	Toronto	Canada	Sound Academy
25 September 2010	Columbia	United States	Virgin Mobile FreeFest 2010
26 September 2010	Philadelphia	United States	The Electric Factory
27 September 2010	New York City	United States	Terminal 5
29 September 2010	Chicago	United States	The Vic Theatre
30 September 2010	Chicago	United States	The Vic Theatre
3 October 2010	Ithaca	United States	Cornell University
4 October 2010	Boston	United States	Royal Boston
5 October 2010	Boston	United States	Royal Boston
6 October 2010	New York City	United States	Brooklyn Bowl
9 October 2010	Austin	United States	Zilker Park
12 October 2010	Oakland	United States	Fox Oakland Theatre
14 October 2010	Los Angeles	United States	Mayan Theater
17 October 2010	Seattle	United States	Showbox at the Market
18 October 2010	Portland	United States	Roseland Theater
Europe
10 November 2010	London	United Kingdom	O2 Academy Brixton
11 November 2010	Oxford	United Kingdom	O2 Academy Oxford
12 November 2010	Dublin	Ireland	Tripod
13 November 2010	Manchester	United Kingdom	The Warehouse Project
15 November 2010	Antwerp	Belgium	Muziekcentrum TRIX
16 November 2010	Cologne	Germany	E-Werk
17 November 2010	Berlin	Germany	Columbiahalle
~~19 November 2010~~	~~Liverpool~~	United Kingdom	~~O2 Academy Liverpool~~
20 November 2010	Leeds	United Kingdom	O2 Academy Leeds
~~22 November 2010~~	~~Glasgow~~	United Kingdom	~~O2 Academy Glasgow~~
24 November 2010	Kortrijk	Belgium	De Kreun
25 November 2010	Amsterdam	Netherlands	Paradiso Grote Zaal
25 November 2010	Eindhoven	Netherlands	STRP Festival
28 November 2010	Munich	Germany	Muffathalle
29 November 2010	Zürich	Switzerland	Rote Fabrik
30 November 2010	Vienna	Austria	Gasometer
2 December 2010	Milan	Italy	Alcatraz
3 December 2010	Rome	Italy	Atlantico Live
6 December 2010	Madrid	Spain	La Riviera
7 December 2010	Barcelona	Spain	Sala Razzmatazz
10 December 2010	Rennes	France	Transmusicales
11 December 2010	Paris	France	Le Trianon
Oceania
21 January 2011	Auckland	New Zealand	Big Day Out 2011
23 January 2011	Gold Coast	Australia	Big Day Out 2011
27 January 2011	Sydney	Australia	Big Day Out 2011
28 January 2011	Sydney	Australia	The Metro Theatre
30 January 2011	Melbourne	Australia	Big Day Out 2011
1 February 2011	Melbourne	Australia	Palace Theatre
4 February 2011	Adelaide	Australia	Big Day Out 2011
6 February 2011	Perth	Australia	Big Day Out 2011
Asia
~~11 February 2011~~	~~Tokyo~~	Japan	~~Studio Coast~~
~~12 February 2011~~	~~Tokyo~~	Japan	~~Zepp Tokyo~~
Europe
16 June 2011	Barcelona	Spain	Sónar Festival
17 June 2011	A Coruña	Spain	Sónar Festival
28 June 2011	Borlänge	Sweden	Peace & Love
30 June 2011	Gdynia	Poland	Heineken Open'er Festival
30 June 2011	Roskilde	Denmark	Roskilde Festival
7 July 2011	Trenčín	Slovakia	Bažant Pohoda
7 July 2011	Novi Sad	Serbia	Exit Festival
