= Vicki Leekx =

Mixtape by M.I.A.
- Released: 31 December 2010
- Recorded: 2010
- Genres: Dance; electronic; hip hop
- Length: 36:17
- Producers: Danja; Munchi; M.I.A.; Diplo; Blaqstarr; Switch; Rusko; VIIXIIV (Sugu Arulpragasam); So Japan

M.I.A. chronology
Maya (2010)	Vicki Leekx (2010)	Matangi (2013)

Vicki Leekx (stylised as ViCKi LEEKX) is the second mixtape by English recording artist M.I.A. It was released on 31 December 2010. Following the release of her album Maya earlier in 2010, M.I.A. announced she would be releasing a mixtape on the final day of the year. Vicki Leekx incorporates reworked versions of tracks from Maya alongside new material, and was reported as having been inspired by the 2010 WikiLeaks controversy, although much of its content is not politically inspired.

== Background ==
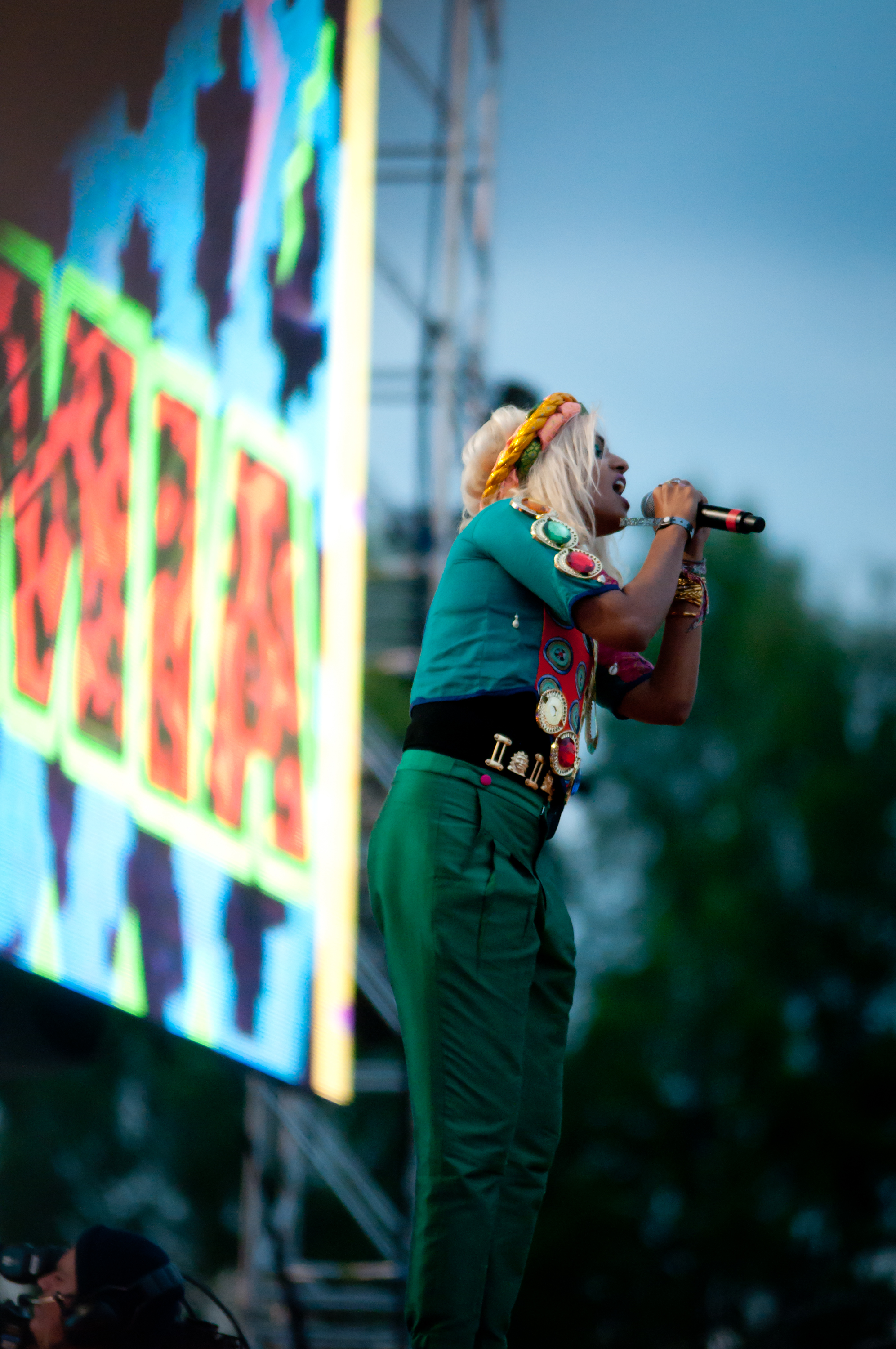
M.I.A. performing in 2011

M.I.A. released her third album Maya in July 2010 to mixed reviews. In early December, she announced on Twitter that she would be following it up with a mixtape to be released on 31 December, stating "vicky leekx [sic] mixtape coming new years eve! layin bad minds to rest 2010!" The mixtape was uploaded online from Bangkok, Thailand, after she sent it via YouSendIt to a friend, stating "VICKILEEKX up/loaded in BANGKOK! thank u, for being a dope ass people/city. cant seem to leave please kick me out! or i wont go!" Exclaim! writer Josiah Hughes contended that the latter portion of the message referred to events which had occurred during the year including the album's mixed reviews and her clashes with journalists and former collaborator Diplo. Zach Baron, writing for The Village Voice, contended that the singer deliberately chose to release the mixtape at the point in the year when internet traffic is traditionally at its lowest, so as "not to feed the online content machines that chewed her up this year". In 2011, M.I.A. shared a demo of the song "27", which she had initially planned to include on Vicki Leekx. The song was a tribute to Amy Winehouse, who had recently died and joined the titular club of musicians who have died at that age.

== Music and lyrics ==
The material included reworked tracks and out-takes from Maya, with previously unreleased material. Some of the tracks, including "Let Me Hump You" and "Gen-N-E-Y", had been made available by M.I.A. earlier in the year at a series of website addresses. The tracks "Meds and Feds" and "Steppin' Up" from Maya appear in radically altered forms, including the removal of the heavy guitar played by Derek E. Miller of the group Sleigh Bells on the original version of the former. A reworked version of "Bad Girls" was later released as a single and included on her 2013 album Matangi.

Vicki Leekx
The mixtape features heavy percussion, Auto-Tuned vocals, and contains attacks on "imitators, haters, and [...] psychos" and "bitches who are fame hoes".

A number of reviewers made a connection between the mixtape's title and the 2010 WikiLeaks controversy. Although the mix opens with a quote about the leaking of information and subsequent legal and political attacks from Julian Assange, founder of Wikileaks, delivered by a female voice, much of the content is not related to the controversy or politically themed. Musically, the mixtape is less abrasive in style than the industrial-influenced Maya, but the lyrics contain a number of attacks on "imitators, haters, and [...] psychos" and "bitches who are fame hoes". The female voice heard at the start, identified by reviewers as the "title character", returns sporadically during the mix speaking internet slogans. At different points the music incorporates heavy percussion, Auto-Tuned vocals, and "bhangra-style" sounds similar to those heard on her second studio album Kala. Most of the mix is at a high tempo, although it slows towards the end, where the longest sections are found.

== Release and reception ==
Professional ratings
Aggregate scores
Source	Rating
Metacritic	75/100
Review scores
Source	Rating
Consequence of Sound	C−
MSN Music (Expert Witness)	B+
Pitchfork	7.8/10
PopMatters	3.5/5 stars
Rolling Stone	3.5/5 stars
Slant Magazine	3.5/5 stars
Sputnikmusic	4/5 stars

Vicki Leekx has been downloadable for free since 31 December 2010. In 2021, M.I.A. released the song "Babylon" and auctioned it as a non-fungible token alongside an extended version of Vicki Leekx, with proceeds going to the Courage Foundation.

In its review of the mixtape, Sputnikmusic commented that "Maya Arulpragasam might have had a rough year, but with Vicki Leekx, she's ended it with a bang". Tom Breihan, a writer from Pitchfork, commented that in "its brief onslaught of sneery fun, Vicki Leekx only occasionally reaches the dizzy pop heights of Arular and Kala. But it does give us an M.I.A. who, once again, seems to be having a blast doing what she's doing. And it's great to learn this M.I.A. still exists". The track "Bad Girls" was listed as "Best New Music" by the same website.

Matthew Cole, reviewing the mixtape in Slant Magazine, described Maya as "an act of musical self-immolation from a self-styled outsider uncomfortable with her own marketability" but that Vicki Leekx was an "ensuing ground-zero dance party" to follow up such a "levelling of her image". Mike Schiller, writing for webzine PopMatters, was positive in his review but stated that the mix sounded like "an artist throwing ideas at a wall and seeing what sticks". In consumer guide for MSN Music, critic Robert Christgau gave Vicki Leekx a B+ rating, indicating "remarkable one way or another, yet also flirts with the humdrum or the half-assed".

== Track listing ==
Although the mixtape consists of a single 36-minute file, the artwork released to accompany it lists twenty tracks.

No.	Title	Length
1.	"Intro"	0:16
2.	"The World"	1:38
3.	"Bamboo Go"	0:58
4.	"Illy Girl"	0:46
5.	"Super Tight"	1:27
6.	"Let Me Hump You"	2:10
7.	"WWW/Meds/Feds"	1:57
8.	"Steppin/Up"	1:01
9.	"Go at It"	1:32
10.	"Vicki Intermission"	0:20
11.	"Gen -N-E-Y"	3:05
12.	"Bad Girls"	2:13
13.	"Dutch Dutch"	0:19
14.	"Marsha/Britney"	2:16
15.	"Tamil Beat Munchi"	1:17
16.	"Listen Up"	2:48
17.	"Mudersounds Munchi"	2:30
18.	"Overdrive"	3:12
19.	"You My Love" (featuring Rosaly)	3:08
20.	"Get Around"	3:28

== Personnel ==
The artwork released to accompany the mixtape credits the producers, listed as M.I.A. herself, Danja, Munchi, Diplo, Blaqstarr, Switch, Rusko, VIIXIIV (a pseudonym for her brother Sugu Arulpragasam) and So Japan, and featured vocals by Rosaly Pfeffer, credited mononymously as Rosaly. The name of Nguzunguzu, a duo which includes Asma Maroof, M.I.A.'s tour DJ, is also prominently displayed; the duo mixed the project.
