= Go! Pop! Bang! =

Studio album by Rye Rye
- Released: May 15, 2012
- Recorded: 2008–2012
- Studios: Bangladesh Studios (Atlanta, Georgia); Chalice Recording Studios, Henson Studios, Paramount Recording Studios, The Record Plant (Hollywood, California); The Cherrytree House, Cherrytree Recording Studios, Interscope Studios (Santa Monica, California); Encore Studios (Burbank, California); G4 Muzik (Dallas, Texas); J.O.B Studios
- Genres: Alternative hip hop; electronic; dance
- Length: 39:14
- Labels: N.E.E.T.; Interscope
- Producers: Steve Angello; Blaqstarr; Christian Rich; Shondrae "Mr. Bangladesh" Crawford; Aaron Dahl; Egyptian Lover; Hervé; J.O.B; Martin "Cherry Cherry Boom Boom" Kierszenbaum; M.I.A.; MadV; Rudy "Mayru" Maya; Ryan Origin; The Neptunes; Play-N-Skillz; RedOne; Sinden; So Japan

Rye Rye chronology
RYEot PowRR (2011)	Go! Pop! Bang! (2012)

Singles from Go! Pop! Bang!
- 1. "Sunshine" Released: October 5, 2010; 2. "Never Will Be Mine" Released: June 7, 2011; 3. "Boom Boom" Released: March 6, 2012

Go! Pop! Bang! is the debut studio album by American rapper Rye Rye. It was released on N.E.E.T. Recordings, an imprint of Interscope Records. The album was originally scheduled for release in 2009, but it has since been delayed several times, due to a pregnancy and label issues. It was eventually released on May 15, 2012, with a deluxe version available through digital music retailers. The album features several artists including M.I.A., Akon, Tyga, Robyn, and Porcelain Black. Production credits are given to M.I.A., The Neptunes, Mr. Bangladesh, and RedOne. The variety of styles brought from each producer was praised by critics.

On the Billboard Hot Dance Club Songs chart, the album's three singles charted in the top 20, with "Never Will Be Mine" and "Boom Boom" being the only ones to break the top 10. As a whole, the album peaked at six on the Top Heatseekers chart. The album also charted on the Top Rap Albums and Top Electronic Albums charts.

== Background ==
Recording started in 2008, with mentor and label boss M.I.A. at hand. M.I.A. took a pivotal role in recording at first, helping produce and write tracks while bringing in hip hop producer Arabian Prince and dance music veteran Egyptian Lover to help record the album. Together they helped to mix tracks such as "Bang". Rye Rye's first official single was the M.I.A.-produced "Sunshine". However, Rye Rye became pregnant in 2009, postponing the release of Go! Pop! Bang!. This would set in motion a series of delays which delayed the album's release until May 2012. Even so, Rye Rye continued to create music during this period, working with music producers Bangladesh and Pharrell. In 2011, she released her first mixtape RYEot PowRR.

== Composition and lyrics ==
Producers on Go! Pop! Bang! include Bangladesh, The Neptunes, M.I.A. and RedOne, each adding a different style to the songs they produced for the album. "It was kind of more about getting comfortable with the album," Rye Rye explains, after taking a hiatus from the album due to a pregnancy "... I started experimenting with other grooves. I felt like I wanted to get some different sounds in. I felt like I was evolving as well, and the times were changing. The first album I did, it was around for awhile [sic], even though nobody else had heard it, it had been around in my ears for so long." "I was just working with different people that had different sounds, and I wanted to kinda work with all of them." Rye Rye said of the plethora of sounds each producer brought to Go! Pop! Bang.

Commenting on the percussive sounds on the album, Rye Rye mentions that Pharrell Williams went for a dub sound on "Shake Twist Drop", while Bangladesh focused on 808s. The former song earned comparisons to M.I.A.'s gaana song "Bird Flu". Rye Rye recalled that working with M.I.A. allowed her "to be herself, cater to society today" and enjoy creative freedom in the studio with her topical themes. RedOne brought a Eurodance sound to the song "DNA" and added guest vocals from Porcelain Black, who is signed to his 2101 Records imprint. The song also features a death growl from that industrial pop singer. Rye Rye describes the song as her favorite on the album. She went into detail, regarding the song's meaning, saying, "It's basically saying everything I did was in my DNA. I'm a party pooper, but any time I hear music, I instantly dance. I could be outside standing on the street, in the store. That's basically what the song is saying. I don't need no Adderall, no Ritalin. It comes natural." Amelia Osowski of CMJ said "DNA" was "destined to be a club hit, or as Rye Rye puts it, 'This is a party anthem.' It's one of those songs that will endlessly loop through your mind as you stumble out of bed the next morning."

"DNA"
"DNA" features a death growl from Porcelain Black paired with synthpop beats, demonstrating the range of musical styles on Go! Pop! Bang!.

The album's ballad, "Crazy Bitch", features Akon and is one of the slowest, sparsest pieces on the album. "Depending on one's investment in dance music, it's either a nice intermission or an unwanted interruption." The Washington Post said. The song "Holla Holla", Godfrey writing for The Washington Post explains, references her long-awaited debut, while being able to compete with Nicki Minaj, Azealia Banks, and Kreayshawn, leading the female MCs in the industry.

Reviewer Gregory Heaney of AllMusic commented on the production of Go! Pop! Bang and M.I.A.'s appearance on multiple songs, saying "While her hook on the chopped-up 'Better than You,' helps to add an extra layer of brash cool to the song, the real heavy hitter on the album is Bangladesh, whose simple and direct approach on tracks like "Hotter" and "Drop" showcases the same knack for dancefloor-crushing beats that the producer has used so effectively for Lil' Wayne and Nicki Minaj."

== Promotion ==
Promotion began in 2009 with the release of the buzz single "Bang", which received positive reviews from music critics. "Bang" was also used for the soundtrack to the 2009 film Fast & Furious and later appeared briefly in the 2010 film Step Up 3D. Rye Rye's track "Get Like This", featuring rapper Busy Signal, appeared on the soundtrack to the 2009 video game NBA Live 10. Following her pregnancy in 2009, she took a short hiatus from promoting the album. By summer 2010, Rye Rye began touring with M.I.A. across Europe, appearing at many of the large music festivals. Late 2010 saw the release of "Sunshine", the first official single off Go! Pop! Bang!. Early 2011 saw Rye Rye collaborating with Urban Outfitters and POP Beauty to create a Go! Pop! Bang!-inspired nail polish set. In addition, Rye Rye embarked on a spring promotional tour, performing in Las Vegas with Robyn on April 14, 2011. This preceded the June 2011 release of "Never Will Be Mine", Rye Rye's second single which features the Swedish singer Robyn. In Summer 2011 promotion of Rye Rye's music saw the use of "New Thing" a new track by Rye Rye used in a Prabal Gurung's fashion video and in an Adidas commercial. Rye Rye has also been affiliated with mobile phone maker HTC. In Spring 2012, Rye Rye released her third single from Go! Pop! Bang!, "Boom Boom", accompanied with a music video. The track listing for Go! Pop! Bang! was revealed via Barnes & Noble's website on April 19.

== Singles ==
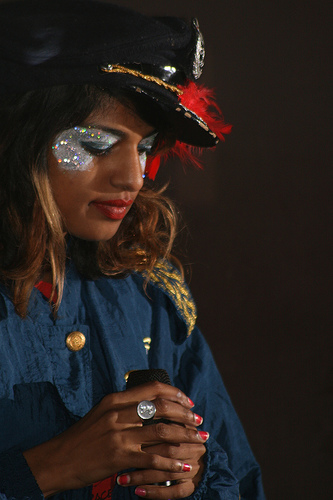
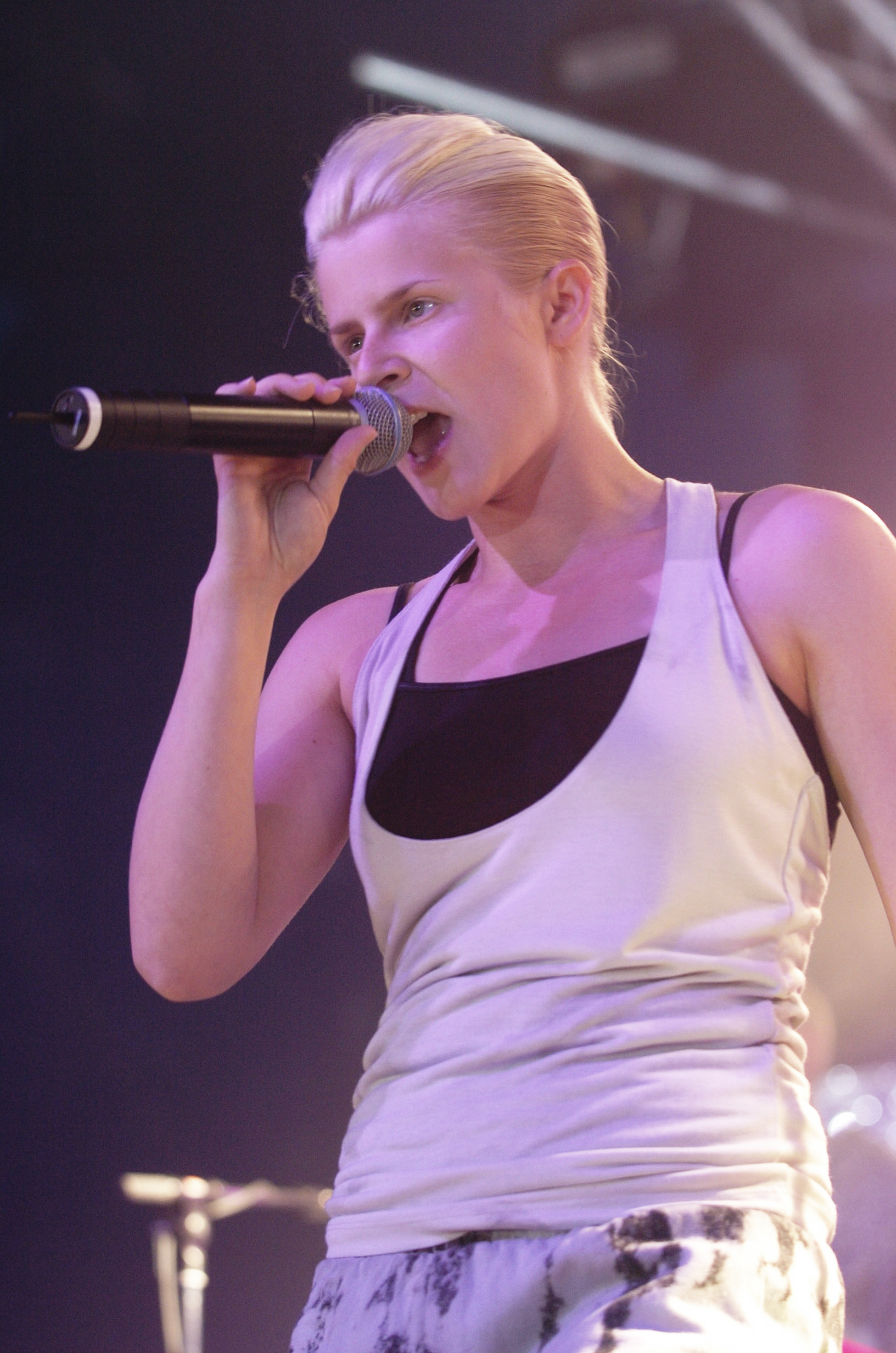
Artists such as M.I.A. (left) and Robyn (right) are featured on Go! Pop! Bang!'s singles

Three singles were released from the album before its debut on May 15, 2012. Sunshine, featuring Rye Rye's mentor, M.I.A, was the album's lead single. Spin called "Sunshine" a tribute to Rye Rye's urban upbringing, with b-girl dance moves, double dutching, and pick-up games. The second single "Never Will Be Mine" samples "Be Mine!" a song by Swedish singer Robyn. The song charted at number 12 on Billboards Hot Dance Club Songs chart. A remix made by R3hab was included on the album, while the original was reserved for the deluxe version. "Never Will Be Mine" is a hip hop ballad that showcases a sweeter side of the Baltimore rapper, contrasting her bubbly and flamboyant nature. Robyn commented that she appreciated how Rye Rye took a sad, ballad song and interpolated it into a different style in a behind-the-scenes documentary.

The third single, "Boom Boom", samples the Vengaboys' 1999 song "Boom, Boom, Boom, Boom!!". A music video accompanying the song was directed by Georgie Greville and Geremie Jasper of Legs Media, and features arcade game graphics reminiscent of the popular video games Space Invaders and Ecco the Dolphin.

Sam Lansky of MTV's Buzzworthy complimented Rye Rye for the inclusion of the Vengaboy's song of a similar title, elevating it above her work with Robyn in "Never Will Be Mine" and the Far East Movement's "Jello". Lansky called the song "a contemporary radio confection, complete with layers of Atari blips and bloops alongside "Ay!" callouts evoking Usher's "Love in This Club." Lansky closed the critique by lauding the video game music samples, calling "Boom Boom" Rye Rye's glossiest and hippest song to date. Jeff Benjamin, a blogger for Billboard, praised how the sampling of Vengaboy, combined with the youthful delivery of her rap lyrics rescued "Boom Boom" from becoming another generic pop song. Benjamin also dubbed the song as fun and appealing, confessing that the song has the potential to convert an entirely new audience to her sound. "Boom Boom" peaked at number eight on the Hot Dance Club songs chart.

== Critical reception ==
Go! Pop! Bang! received generally positive reviews. Steve Jones of USA Today gave the album three out of four stars, saying, "[Go! Pop! Bang! has] rapid-fire boasts flow over a stream of bass-heavy beats is guaranteed to get the feet of the most recalcitrant wallflowers moving to the dance floor," adding that once the record starts, there's no use sitting down. Despite the many guest singers and rappers on the album, USA Today noticed that Rye Rye never gives up center stage. Charley Rogulewski of AOL's The Boom Box called the album a "pop experiment", likening the production and sweet yet fast-paced vocals to Nicki Minaj's Pink Friday: Roman Reloaded and Santigold's 2008 debut album.

Sarah Godfrey of The Washington Post noted that Rye Rye "has moved away from the unadulterated Baltimore club of her early collaborations with DJ Blaqstarr, but the city still flavors her music, as on the Pharrell-produced 'Shake Twist Drop,' which sounds like the Morgan State marching band battling kids playing a clapping game on a Baltimore stoop." Jody Rosen of Rolling Stone said the exclamation points in the album's title are no joke, claiming that the "unflagging energy lifts even the least of her material." AllMusic gave Go! Pop! Bang! three and a half stars out of five, lauding Rye Rye's enthusiastic debut's mixture of hip hop swagger with irresistible dance-floor beats.

== Track listing ==
Go! Pop! Bang! track listing
No.	Title	Writer(s)	Producer(s)	Length
1.	"Drop"	Ryeisha Berrain; Shondrae Crawford; Sonti Brown	Shondrae "Mr. Bangladesh" Crawford	4:25
2.	"Holla Holla"	Berrain; Lazonate Franklin	Steve Angello	2:44
3.	"DNA" (featuring Porcelain Black)	Berrain; Jimmy Joker; Teddy Sky; BeatGeek	RedOne	3:53
4.	"Crazy Bitch" (featuring Akon)	Berrain; Juan Salinas Jr.; Oscar Salinas; Aliaune Thiam	Play-N-Skillz	3:32
5.	"Hotter"	Berrain; Crawford; Christine Taylor; Carla Henderson	Crawford	4:15
6.	"Sunshine" (featuring M.I.A.)	Berrain; Maya Arulpragasam	M.I.A.	3:21
7.	"Boom Boom"	Berrain; Rudy Maya; Benny Andersson; Wessel van Diepen; Björn Ulvaeus; Dennis van den Driesschen	Rudy "Mayru" Maya; Aaron Dahl^{[a]}	3:22
8.	"Better than You" (featuring M.I.A.)	Berrain; Arulpragasam; Irving Berlin; Courcy Magnus; Kyle Edwards	So Japan	3:24
9.	"Never Will Be Mine" (R3hab remix; featuring Robyn)	Berrain; Robin Carlsson; Klas Åhlund; Martin Kierszenbaum	Martin "Cherry Cherry Boom Boom" Kierszenbaum; R3hab^{[b]}	3:04
10.	"Dance"	Berrain; Kehinde Hassan; Taiwo Hassan; J. Robinson	Christian Rich	3:28
11.	"Shake Twist Drop" (featuring Tyga)	Berrain; Pharrell Williams; Michael Stevenson	The Neptunes	3:46

Digital deluxe edition bonus tracks
No.	Title	Writer(s)	Producer(s)	Length
12.	"Shake It to the Ground"	Charles "Blaqstarr" Smith; Berrain	Blaqstarr	2:47
13.	"Rock Off Shake Off" (featuring M.I.A.)	Arulpragasam; Berrain; Greg Broussard	M.I.A.; Egyptian Lover	3:44
14.	"New Thing"	Berrain; John O'Brien; Miguel De Vivo; Ryan Kull; Shawn Breathwaite	J.O.B; MadV; Ryan Origin	2:38
15.	"Hardcore Girls"	Berrain; Joshua Harvey; Graeme Sinden	Hervé; Sinden	4:18
16.	"Bang" (featuring M.I.A.)	Berrain; Arulpragasam; Smith	Blaqstarr	3:32
17.	"Never Will Be Mine" (featuring Robyn)	Berrain; Carlsson; Åhlund; Kierszenbaum	Kierszenbaum	3:23

Notes

- ^{^a} signifies an additional vocal producer
- ^{^b} signifies a remixer and additional producer

Sample credits

- "Boom Boom" contains elements of "Boom, Boom, Boom, Boom!!", written and performed by Vengaboys.
- "Better than You" contains a sample of the recording "Anything You Can Do", written by Irving Berlin and performed by Ethel Merman and Ray Middleton.
- "Never Will Be Mine" and its remix contain a sample of "Be Mine!" (live at The Cherrytree House), written by Robin Carlsson and Klas Åhlund, and performed by Robyn.

== Personnel ==
Credits adapted from the liner notes of the digital deluxe edition of Go! Pop! Bang!

- Akon – vocals (track 4)
- Steve Angello – production (track 2)
- Arabian Prince – mixing (tracks 13, 16)
- Yaneley Arty – management
- Mac Attkisson – recording (tracks 1, 5)
- BeatGeek – all instruments, instrument programming (track 3)
- Blaqstarr – production (tracks 12, 16); recording (track 16)
- Mike Bozzi – mastering (tracks 3, 4, 7, 11)
- Christian Rich – production (track 10)
- Andrew Coleman – arrangement, digital editing, recording (track 11)
- Shondrae "Mr. Bangladesh" Crawford – production (tracks 1, 5)
- Aaron Dahl – additional vocals recording (track 4); mixing (tracks 6, 12); additional vocal production (track 7); engineering (tracks 7, 12); recording (track 16)
- Egyptian Lover – production (track 13); mixing (track 16)
- Carly Ellis – wardrobe
- Chris Galland – mixing assistance (tracks 8, 11)
- Brian Gardner – mastering (tracks 1, 2, 6, 8–10, 12–16)
- Jesus Garnica – mix assistance (track 2)
- Geo Slam – engineering, recording (track 3)
- Geoff Gibbs – engineering (track 10)
- Dana Goldstein – photography
- Gene Grimaldi – single mastering (tracks 3, 7)
- Hervé – mixing, production (track 15)
- Ghazi Hourani – mixing assistance (track 1); assistant engineering (tracks 4, 10)
- J.O.B – engineering, production (track 14)
- Jesse Jackson – recording (track 11)
- Jimmy Joker – all instruments, instrument programming (track 3)
- Jaycen Joshua – mixing (track 2)
- Chris Kasych – recording (track 11)
- Martin "Cherry Cherry Boom Boom" Kierszenbaum – backing vocals, keyboards, production (tracks 9, 17); executive production
- Stephen Loveridge – art direction, design
- M.I.A. – production (tracks 6, 13); vocals (tracks 6, 8, 13, 16); mixing, recording (track 16); executive production
- Erik Madrid – mixing assistance (tracks 8, 11)
- MadV – production (track 14)
- Fabian Marascuillo – mixing (tracks 1, 4, 5, 10, 14)
- Manny Marroquin – mixing (tracks 8, 11)
- Jaime Martinez – photography
- Rudy "Mayru" Maya – production (track 7)
- Meeno – photography
- Trevor Muzzy – engineering, guitars, recording, vocal editing (track 3)
- Ryan Origin – production (track 14)
- Robert Orton – mixing (tracks 3, 7, 9, 17)
- The Neptunes – production (track 11)
- Play-N-Skillz – production (track 4)
- Porcelain Black – vocals (track 3)
- R3hab – additional production, remix (track 9)
- RedOne – production (track 3)
- Robyn – vocals (tracks 9, 17)
- Jose "Hoza" Rodriguez – stylist
- Sinden – production (track 15)
- Teddy Sky – backing vocals, recording, vocal editing (track 3)
- Nandi Smythe – management coordination
- So Japan – production (track 8)
- Tyga – rap (track 11)
- Tony Ugval – engineering (tracks 9, 17)
- Gary "Ski Live" Walker – recording (track 4)
- Halley Wollens – photography

== Charts ==
Chart performance for Go! Pop! Bang!
Chart (2012)	Peak position
US Top Current Albums (Billboard)	190
US Top Dance/Electronic Albums (Billboard)	12
US Top Heatseekers Albums (Billboard)	6
US Top Rap Albums (Billboard)	23
