= Boom Boom (Rye Rye song) =

Single by Rye Rye

from the album Go! Pop! Bang!
- Released: March 6, 2012
- Recorded: 2012
- Genre: Bubblegum pop; electro-hop; electropop
- Length: 3:22
- Label: Interscope Records
- Songwriters: Ryeisha Berrain, Rudy Maya, B. Andersson, D. Van Diepen, B. Ulvaeus, D. Drieschen
- Producer: Rudy "Mayru" Maya

Rye Rye singles chronology
"New Thing" (2011)	"Boom Boom" (2012)

Music video
- "Boom Boom" on YouTube

"Boom Boom" is a song by American recording artist, Rye Rye. It serves as the fourth single from her debut album, Go! Pop! Bang!. It was released to iTunes via Interscope Records on March 6, 2012. The chorus is a cover of "Boom, Boom, Boom, Boom" by Vengaboys. A music video, incorporating video game motifs, was released on March 22, 2012.

The song was received well by reviewers, who compared the music video and lyrics to the works of Usher and Nicki Minaj. Shortly after its release, the song peaked at number 8 on Billboard's Hot Dance Club Songs chart.

== Composition ==
"Boom Boom" is a bubblegum pop, electro-hop, and electropop song that employs pop hooks. The chorus samples a riff from the Eurodance song "Boom, Boom, Boom, Boom" by Vengaboys.

== Critical reception ==
MTV compared "Boom Boom" to Usher's "Love in This Club".

"Boom Boom" received positive reviews. Rap-Up called "Boom Boom" fun, flirty, and a dance floor-ready delight. Sam Lansky of MTV's Buzzworthy congratulated Rye Rye on the inclusion of Vengaboy's smash hit of a similar title, elevating it above her work with Robyn in "Never Will Be Mine" and the Far East Movement's "Jello". Lansky called the song, "a contemporary radio confection, complete with layers of Atari blips and bloops alongside "Ay!" callouts evoking Usher's "Love in This Club." Lansky closed the critique by lauding the video game music samples, calling "Boom Boom" Rye Rye's glossiest and hippest song to date. Jeff Benjamin, a blogger for Billboard, praised how the sampling of Vengaboy’s combined with the youthful delivery of her rap lyrics rescued "Boom Boom" from becoming another generic pop song. Benjamin also dubbed the song as fun and appealing, confessing that the song has the potential to convert an entirely new audience to her sound.

== Music video ==
A video for "Boom Boom" was released on Rye Rye's official VEVO account on March 22, 2012. The video depicts Rye Rye in colorful clothing and hairstyles, battling digital foes in Street Fighter X Tekken fashion, and riding a dolphin equipped with laser cannons.Selena Gomez and Florence + The Machine directors, Georgie Greville and Geremie Jasper of Legs Media directed the video for "Boom Boom".

Rap-Up called it "action packed", praising the video game theme as appropriate compared with the electronic tone of the music. Global Grind noted that the music video's imagery paralleled classic video games. They compared Rye Rye's dancing style to Dance Dance Revolution of arcade nostalgia, her dolphin riding to Ecco the Dolphin, and the rainbow dragon fought as a "final boss" as reminiscent of Space Invaders. Global Grind called the video, "unique", "soooo Rye Rye", and "super cool". Marc Hogan, a writer for Spin, praised the atmosphere of the video, from the swirling chess boards to the Super Mario Bros.-inspired underwater terrain to the inevitable shirtless male dancers. Hogan noted that the music video, while visually extravagant, was likely to net her Nicki Minaj comparisons due to the two having similar artistic styles that challenge the boundaries of pop music. Hogan stated in another review of "Boom Boom" that "It's not necessarily the rapper's best work, but it's solid bubblegum pop that aims toward the lowest common denominator without erasing her distinctive personality entirely — a difficult feat."

== Track listings and formats ==
Boom Boom - Single

1. "Boom Boom" – 3:23

Boom Boom (The Remixes)

1. "Boom Boom (Kat Krazy Club Remix)" - 4:52
2. "Boom Boom (Kat Krazy Radio Edit)" - 3:35
3. "Boom Boom (Tom Neville's Cannonball Remix)" - 6:06
4. "Boom Boom (Digital Lab Remix)" - 6:51
5. "Boom Boom (EOS Remix)" - 4:43
6. "Boom Boom (Glow In the Dark Remix)" - 5:30
7. "Boom Boom (Yogi Remix)" - 3:11
8. "Boom Boom (Wayne & Woods Remix)" - 5:00

== Chart performance ==
Chart (2011–12)	Peak position
US Hot Dance Club Songs (Billboard)	8
