= HazeBanga =

- Also known as: HAZE
- Born: Rashad Muhammad; San Diego, California; U.S.
- Genres: Hip hop; R&B; pop
- Occupations: Record producer; recording engineer; audio mixer; songwriter
- Years active: 2013–present
- Label: PM
- Website: www.hazebanga.com

Rashad Muhammad, better known as HazeBanga and HAZE, is an American record producer from San Diego, California. He has been credited on releases for artists including Beyoncé, Mariah Carey, M.I.A., will.i.am, Selena Gomez, and Rita Ora. At the 59th Annual Grammy Awards, he earned an Album of the Year nomination for his work on Beyonce's Lemonade (2016).

== Musical career ==
HAZE released his debut instrumental concept album, PHANTASIA, on April 14, 2020.

== Discography ==
=== Albums ===
List of studio albums, with release details
Title	Album details
PHANTASIA	Released: April 14, 2020; Label: PM; Formats: digital download, streaming

=== Extended plays ===
List of extended plays, with release details
Title	EP Details
New Tier (with Tre Capital)	Released: February 28, 2018; Label: 916% Entertainment; Formats: digital download, streaming

== Production credits ==
Credits adapted from AllMusic and Discogs.

List of placements, showing year released, song title, performing artist(s), project name, credit(s) and single classification
Year	Title	Artist	Album / EP	Credit	Single
2013	"XO"	Beyoncé	Beyoncé	Additional Production	check
2013	"***Flawless"	Beyoncé	Beyoncé	Co-Production	check
2013	"Boom Skit"	M.I.A.	Matangi	Co-Production	
2013	"Sexodus"	M.I.A.	Matangi	Co-Production • Mixing Engineer	check
2013	"Scream & Shout (Hit-Boy Remix)" (featuring Hit-Boy, Waka Flocka Flame, Lil Wayne and Diddy)	will.i.am and Britney Spears	#willpower	Co-Production	
2013	"What Ya Used To" (Rockie Fresh featuring Hit-Boy)	MMG	Self Made Vol. 3	Co-Production	
2013	"Kiss It" (featuring Sage the Gemini)	DEV	—N/a	Co-Production	check
2013	"Shine"	Audio Push	Come As You Are	Producer	check
2014	"Thirsty"	Mariah Carey	Me. I Am Mariah... The Elusive Chanteuse	Additional Production • Mixing Engineer	check
2014	"Dedicated" (featuring Nas)	Mariah Carey	Me. I Am Mariah... The Elusive Chanteuse	Additional Production	
2014	"Money ($ * / ...)" (featuring Fabolous)	Mariah Carey	Me. I Am Mariah... The Elusive Chanteuse	Co-Production	
2014	"Clappers (Remix)" (featuring Rick Ross, Fat Trel and Young Thug)	Wale	—	Co-Production	
2014	"No Talkin’" (featuring Hit-Boy, Rich Boy and Peej)	HS87	We the Plug	Co-Production	check
2014	"Rude Awakening" (featuring Hit-Boy, BMACTHEQUEEN, Price and Big Hit)	HS87	We the Plug	Additional Production	
2014	"Scorn" (featuring Audio Push, Hit-Boy, Kid Cudi and Kent M$NEY)	HS87	We the Plug	Co-Production	check
2014	"Picture" (featuring Hit-Boy, K. Roosevelt and Chili Chil)	HS87	We the Plug	Co-Production	
2014	"Members Only" (featuring Hit-Boy, Audio Push, BMACTHEQUEEN, Kent M$NEY, K. Roosevelt and James Fauntleroy)	HS87	We the Plug	Co-Production	
2014	"B.B.H." (featuring BMACTHEQUEEN, Audio Push and Hit-Boy)	HS87	We the Plug	Additional Production	
2014	"Grindin’ My Whole Life" (featuring N.No, B.CaRR, Hit-Boy, Big Hit, Audio Push, BMACTHEQUEEN and Kent M$NEY)	HS87	We the Plug	Co-Production	check
2014	"Alert" (featuring Hit-Boy and Nipsey Hussle)	HS87	We the Plug	Producer	
2015	"Revival"	Selena Gomez	Revival	Co-Production	
2015	"Body Heat"	Selena Gomez	Revival	Additional Production	
2015	"Body on Me (Fetty Wap Remix)" (featuring Chris Brown and Fetty Wap)	Rita Ora	—	Producer	
2015	"Wonderful" (featuring Ty Dolla $ign)	Casey Veggies	Live & Grow	Co-Production • Mixing Engineer	check
2015	"Alieno"	Fabri Fibra	Squallor	Producer	
2015	"Squallor"	Fabri Fibra	Squallor	Producer	
2016	"Sorry"	Beyoncé	Lemonade	Co-Production	check
2016	"Red Lights"	Chloe x Halle	Sugar Symphony	Producer	
2016	"Big Boss Big Time Business"	Santigold	99¢	Producer	
2016	"Goddess"	STANAJ	The Preview	Producer	
2016	"L.A.N.C.E."	June's Diary	—	Producer	check
2016	"Something Special"	PJ	Rare	Producer	
2016	"Dark Blue"	K. Roosevelt	Neon Haze	Co-Production	
2016	"Get To Know You"	K. Roosevelt	Neon Haze	Co-Production	
2016	"Going Crazy"	K. Roosevelt	Neon Haze	Co-Production	
2017	"Got Her Own"	Syd	Fin	Producer	
2017	"Over" (featuring 6lack)	Syd	Fin	Producer	
2017	"Only Love"	Wafia	VIII	Producer	
2018	"Me vs. Us"	Tayla Parx	We Need to Talk	Producer	check
2018	"Hey Up There" (featuring Ty Dolla $ign)	Buddy	Harlan & Alondra	Producer	check
2018	"Poolside Manor" (Niki and August 08)	88rising	Head in the Clouds	Producer	
2018	"Don’t Waste It"	August 08	Father	Producer	
2018	"Ain't No Feeling"	Elley Duhé	—	Co-Production	check
2018	"Way Down Low"	Elley Duhé	Dragon Mentality	Producer	check
2019	"Wannabe"	Logic	Confessions of a Dangerous Mind	Producer	
2019	"Keep On"	Tre Capital	—	Producer	
2020	"Poetry"	Amir Obè	—	Producer	check
2020	"On Tour"	Teejayx6	—	Producer	check
2020	"Replace Me" (featuring Big Sean and Don Toliver)	Nas	King's Disease	Producer	

== Awards and nominations ==
=== Grammy Awards ===
Year	Nominated Work	Category	Result	Ref
2017	Lemonade	Album of the Year	Nominated	

=== ASCAP Rhythm & Soul Music Awards ===
Year	Nominated Work	Category	Result	Ref
2015	"***Flawless"	Award Winning R&B/Hip-Hop Songs	Won	
2017	"Sorry"	Award Winning R&B/Hip-Hop Songs	Won	

== Filmography ==
=== Film ===
Year	Title	Credit	Notes	Ref
2019	BEAMED	Director	Short film	
2019	SILVER	Director	Short film	
2020	PHANTASIA - CHAPTER 1	Director, Editor and Color	Short film	

=== Music videos ===
2020

- Uni The Fly Pilot - "Time" (Fantasy Visual)
