= Swords (M.I.A. song) =

2015 song performed by M.I.A.

Single by M.I.A.

from the album AIM
- B-side: "Warriors"
- Released: 17 August 2015
- Length: 2:24
- Label: Interscope
- Songwriter(s): Maya Arulpragasam; Jerry Leembruggen; Ruben Fernhout; Tevin Plaate; Kaushal Sahil; Hirdesh Singh
- Producer(s): M.I.A.; the Partysquad; Hit-Boy; Spanker

M.I.A. singles chronology
"Sexodus" (2015)	"Swords" (2015)	"Borders" (2015)

Music video
- "Matahdatah Scroll 01 "Broader Than A Border" on YouTube

"Swords" is a song by British recording artist M.I.A. The track was written by M.I.A., Jerry Leembruggen, Ruben Fernhout, Yo Yo Honey Singh, Tevin Plaate and Kaushal Sahil. Leembruggen and Fernhout are part of the Partysquad, who produced the song alongside M.I.A. and Spanker. The track is centred around the sound of clinging swords, recorded during filming the music video, and was completed overnight during the singer's stay in India.

The song was released as part of "Matahdatah Scroll 01 "Broader Than a Border"", which featured both "Swords", and the track "Warriors", from M.I.A.'s fourth studio album, Matangi. It was self-released worldwide, under exclusive license to Interscope on 17 August 2015. The song has not yet been performed live.

== Music video ==
The six-minute music video, which featured both "Swords" and "Warriors", was directed by M.I.A. herself and premiered exclusively on Apple Music on 13 July 2015, simultaneously with the single. Filmed in Kolhapur city of Maharashtra, India, "Swords" features female dancers performing routines with swords and sticks, interspersed with scenes of M.I.A. in a 10th-century Hindu temple and lighting a big Om sign. The video for "Warriors" was shot in Ivory Coast in West Africa and features a Zaouli dancer. M.I.A. said she had seen a footage of him on YouTube and has spent two years trying to locate him. She then flew to Africa and filmed his performance.

== Track listing ==
1. "Swords" – 2:24
2. "Warriors" – 3:41
3. "Matahdatah Scroll 01 "Broader Than a Border"" (video) – 5:55

== Charts ==
Chart (2015)	Peak position
France (SNEP)	188
US Dance/Electronic Digital Songs (Billboard)	14
US Dance/Electronic Songs (Billboard)	38

== Release history ==
Region	Date	Format	Label
Worldwide	17 August 2015	Digital download, streaming	Interscope
