= AIM (album) =

Studio album by M.I.A.
- Released: 9 September 2016
- Recorded: 2014–2016
- Genres: Alternative hip hop; dance; pop; worldbeat
- Length: 39:49
- Labels: Polydor; Interscope
- Producers: Blaqstarr; Diplo; Fakear; Leo Justi; M.I.A.; Polow da Don; Richard X; Skrillex; Surkin; The Partysquad; ADP; João Barbosa; Justus Arison; Levi Lennox; MC Renee; Spanker

M.I.A. chronology
Matangi (2013)	AIM (2016)	Mata (2022)

Singles from AIM
- 1. "Swords" Released: 13 July 2015; 2. "Borders" Released: 27 November 2015; 3. "Go Off" Released: 14 July 2016; 4. "Bird Song" Released: 12 August 2016; 5. "Freedun" Released: 2 September 2016; 6. "Finally" Released: 15 June 2017

AIM is the fifth studio album by English rapper and singer M.I.A. It was released on 9 September 2016 by Interscope and Polydor Records. Prior to its release, M.I.A. claimed that it would be her final album. She worked on the composition and production of the album with a range of collaborators, including Blaqstarr, Diplo, and Skrillex. The album was recorded in various countries, including Jamaica and India, and includes vocal contributions from Dexta Daps and Zayn. As with M.I.A.'s earlier releases, the album mixes Eastern and Western musical influences. Lyrically, several tracks on the album contain themes of borders and refugees.

AIM received mixed to positive reviews from music critics, with some praising certain songs but arguing that the overall album lacked focus. In the US, the album peaked at number 66 on the Billboard 200 albums chart and was her first album not to reach the top 40 since her debut release in 2005, although like her previous three albums AIM topped the magazine's Dance/Electronic Albums chart.

== Background and recording ==
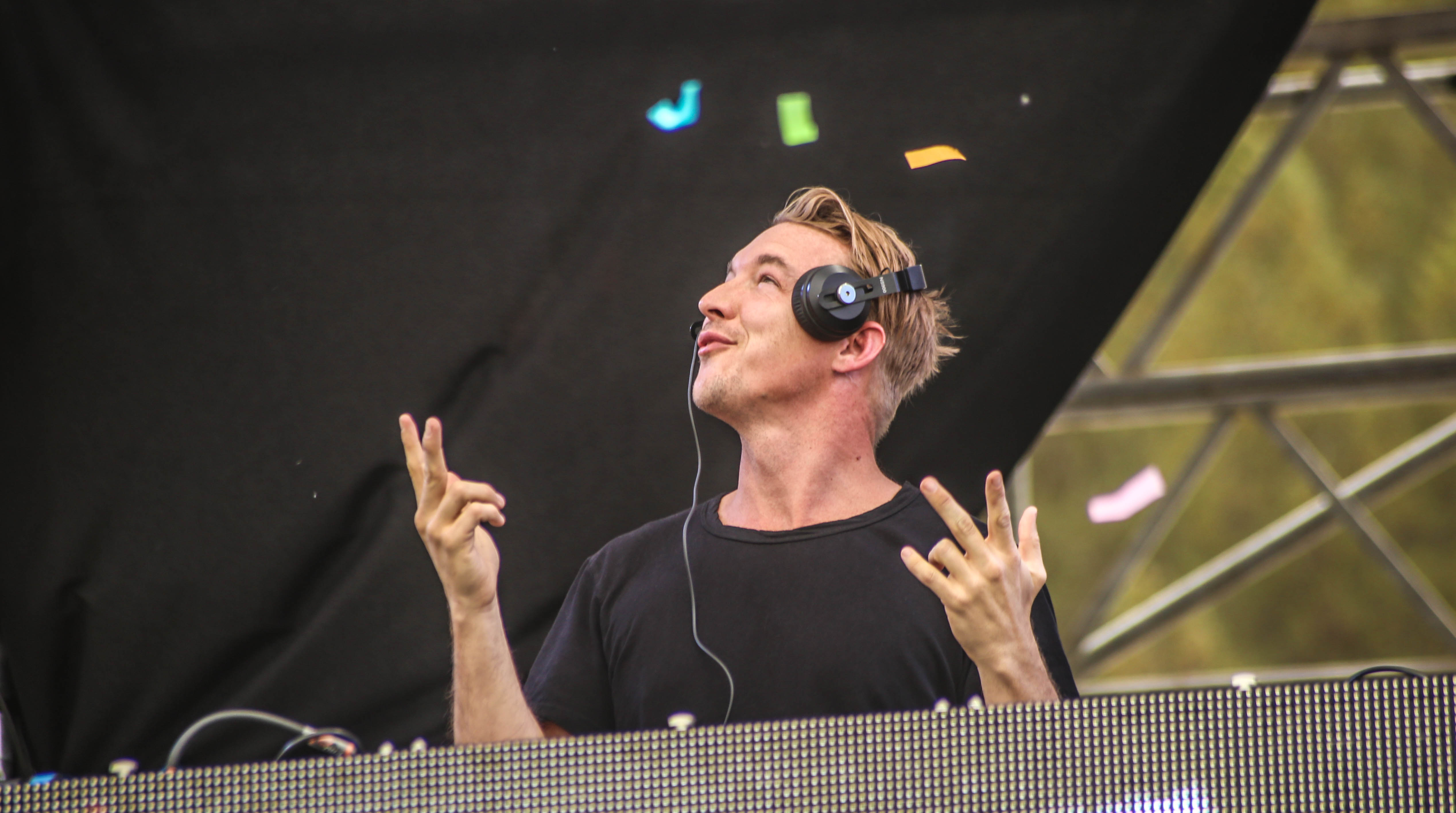
Producer Diplo returned to working with M.I.A. following a personal dispute.

British rapper and singer M.I.A. released her fourth album Matangi in November 2013. Although it received generally positive reviews, it failed to match the commercial performance of her previous two albums. Early reports indicated that the rapper's next album would be titled Matahdatah and have the concept of an audio-visual series filmed around the world, but on 14 July 2016, M.I.A. confirmed that the album would actually be entitled AIM. She considered it her most positive work, saying that there were "no complaints" on it, and claimed that it would be her last album.

Tracks for the album were recorded in various locations around the world. M.I.A. used several different studios in Jamaica to record five songs which appear on the recording, including "Foreign Friend", which features a guest appearance by Jamaican singjay Dexta Daps. "Swords" was recorded during a trip to India. The rapper worked with a number of producers on the album, including reuniting with American producer Diplo. The pair had collaborated previously, including on M.I.A.'s biggest hit, "Paper Planes", but had subsequently experienced a personal dispute which included M.I.A. attacking Diplo in interviews, and led to Matangi being the first of her albums to include no input from Diplo. In June 2016, however, M.I.A. visited the Parklife music festival in Manchester, where Diplo was performing as part of Major Lazer, and the pair worked on the track, reportedly in the festival's car park. Diplo characterised the recording of the track, which included M.I.A. sending a new section of vocals to him at the last minute, as "done very much in [M.I.A.'s] style: complete chaos".

M.I.A. reportedly wrote "Borders" in two hours, the quickest she had ever written a song. The track "Freedun" features vocals by former One Direction member Zayn Malik, although the two did not actually meet during its recording. M.I.A. stated that she had written the song at a much earlier date but had previously deemed it "a bit too mainstream sounding" for her to record, but that it was well-suited to the collaboration with Malik. She also stated that she had spoken to Popcaan and Rihanna about collaborating on the album, but that neither opportunity had come to fruition.

== Music and lyrics ==
As with M.I.A.'s earlier releases, the album mixes Eastern and Western musical influences. The track "Swords" uses the sound of clashing swords, recorded in India, as percussion. In its earliest form, the song "Visa" sampled Elton John's song "Circle of Life" from the film The Lion King. M.I.A. later announced via the video streaming service Periscope that she had replaced the "Circle of Life" sample with a sample of her own early single, "Galang", claiming that she had received legal threats and that if she used her own song, no one would be able to "stop it".

M.I.A. "Bird Song" (2016)
A sample of "Bird Song"

Lyrically, a number of tracks on the album contain themes of borders and refugees. The song "Freedun" sparked a brief controversy when many listeners believed that the lyrics contained the word "rape", however the rapper was insistent that the word was actually "rate". The lyrics of "Bird Song" consist mainly of puns centred on the names of species of bird. Two versions of the track appear on the album. The version produced by Blaqstarr focusses heavily on sounds which have been likened to that of a kazoo, while the version produced by Diplo features more guitar sounds and less kazoo.

== Release and artwork ==
In May 2016, M.I.A. stated that the album would be released in July of the same year, but in July the release date was pushed back to September. The official track listing of the deluxe edition was announced on 18 August 2016. The album's cover was revealed on the same day and features a cropped photograph of the rapper on an orange and black background. The album's artwork also includes the slogan "M.I.A. - Uniting people since 2003" and images of flowers, books, and hands making a bird-like shape.

== Promotion ==
A number of the songs from the album were made available ahead of the album's release, either as singles or through other media. The first teaser of the project came in May 2015, when M.I.A. shared the demo version of the track "Platforms" on her SoundCloud page. "The New International Sound Pt. 2" was first released in June 2015, as part of the French producer Surkin's project GENER8ION. "Swords" and "Borders" were both released later the same year. In March of the following year, M.I.A. debuted "MIA OLA" (later renamed "Visa") via her SoundCloud. The complete album, consisting of 12 tracks, was previewed on Periscope on 17 May 2016.

"Go Off" was released as a single on 14 July 2016; it was premiered on the same day on the BBC Radio 1 show hosted by Annie Mac. The Blaqstarr-produced version of "Bird Song" was released on 12 August 2016 and the Diplo version of the same song six days later. "Freedun" was released as the fifth single on 2 September 2016.

== Critical reception ==
Professional ratings
Aggregate scores
Source	Rating
AnyDecentMusic?	6.1/10
Metacritic	65/100
Review scores
Source	Rating
AllMusic	3.5/5 stars
Entertainment Weekly	B+
The Guardian	3/5 stars
The Independent	3/5 stars
The Irish Times	3/5 stars
NME	4/5 stars
Pitchfork	5.9/10
Rolling Stone	3/5 stars
The Times	2/5 stars
Vice	A

AIM received mixed to positive reviews by critics. At Metacritic, which assigns a weighted mean rating out of 100 to reviews from mainstream publications, the album received an average score of 65, based on 29 reviews, indicating "generally favorable reviews".

Writing in The Guardian, Harriet Gibsone took note of the album's "vision, scope and experimentation", but described it overall as "frustratingly unfocused". Will Hodgkinson said the record "starts well but quickly meanders into mediocrity", in his review for The Times. Greg Cochrane from Loud and Quiet magazine praised several individual tracks but described the album as sounding "disparate, like a collection of ideas rather than songs". El Hunt, in DIY, referred to the album "colliding jangling rhythms with brash, lane-switching pop parps", describing the music as "abrasive" and "divisive". In The Irish Times, Jim Carroll said while M.I.A. "throws plenty of tough punches at the refugee crisis on excellent tunes such as Borders, Visa and Foreign Friend", the rest of the album finds her toning down "the polemic in favour of more user-friendly pop grooves which lack the focus or laser-guided pitch of her other work".

A more positive review came from Stephen Carlick of Exclaim!, who was slightly critical of the album's length but believed there was "plenty here to love" and stated that overall it was "focused and purposeful, a loose collection characterized by sticky-hot swagger, political awareness and, most importantly, urgency." Q magazine said it was perhaps M.I.A.'s best album since 2007's Kala, while Gary Suarez from The Quietus regarded it as one of 2017's best hip hop albums. Vulture critic Craig Jenkins called it M.I.A.'s "dance-pop salvo" and "a welcoming blend of old-school hip-hop, dancehall, dubstep, and Eastern textures".

Especially positive of the album was the veteran critic Robert Christgau; although he wrote in Vice that the album was "loopy [and] simplistic" with lyrics that are "beyond basic", he commented positively on the presence of an overall tone of self-acceptance in the artist's refugee identity: "Bad shit being her heritage, she intends to enjoy herself however bad the shit gets, and so should we." In his ballot for The Village Voice's annual Pazz & Jop critics poll, Christgau ranked it as the fourth best album of the year. Rolling Stone ranked AIM at number 18 on its annual year-end list of the 20 best albums in popular music.

== Commercial performance ==
The album entered the UK Albums Chart at number 63, one place higher than Matangi, but only spent one week on the chart. On the US Billboard 200 chart the album debuted at number 66, but as in the UK fell off the chart entirely the following week. It was her first album not to reach the top 40 on the Billboard 200 since Arular, her debut, which reached number 190. The album debuted atop the US Dance/Electronic Albums chart, with 6,000 copies sold in its first week, making it her fourth consecutive album to debut at number one on the chart, as well as her fifth album overall to reach the top five.

== Track listing ==
Credits adapted from liner notes.

AIM – Standard version
No.	Title	Writer(s)	Producer(s)	Length
1.	"Borders"	Maya Arulpragasam; Amish Patel; Levi Lennox	ADP; Lennox^{[b]}	4:11
2.	"Go Off"	Arulpragasam; Charles Smith; Sonny Moore	Skrillex; Blaqstarr	3:04
3.	"Bird Song" (Blaqstarr remix)	Arulpragasam; Smith	Blaqstarr	3:01
4.	"Jump In"	Arulpragasam; Smith	Blaqstarr	2:23
5.	"Freedun" (featuring Zayn)	Arulpragasam; Zayn Malik; Jamal Jones; Keisha Hollins	Polow da Don	4:41
6.	"Foreign Friend" (featuring Dexta Daps)	Arulpragasam; David Harrisingh; Craig Harrisingh; Louis Anthony Grandison	M.I.A.; Daseca	4:23
7.	"Finally"	Arulpragasam; Théo Le Vigoureux; Patel; Branko (João Barbosa)	ADP; Branko	3:00
8.	"A.M.P (All My People)"	Arulpragasam; Moore	M.I.A.; Skrillex; Leo Justi^{[a]}	3:21
9.	"Ali R U OK?"	Arulpragasam; Smith; Richard Philips	Blaqstarr; M.I.A.; Richard X	3:30
10.	"Visa"	Arulpragasam; Justine Frischmann; Ross Orton; Steve Mackey	M.I.A.; Neil Comber	2:51
11.	"Fly Pirate"	Arulpragasam; Smith	Blaqstarr	2:25
12.	"Survivor"	Arulpragasam; Justus Arison; Andrew Myrie; Tristan Boston	Justus	2:59
Total length:				39:49

AIM – Deluxe version (bonus tracks)
No.	Title	Writer(s)	Producer(s)	Length
13.	"Bird Song" (Diplo remix)	Arulpragasam; Smith; Ilayaraja	Diplo; Blaqstarr	3:22
14.	"The New International Sound Pt. 2" (featuring Gener8ion)	Arulpragasam; Benoit Heitz; Cédric Steffens	Gener8ion	3:28
15.	"Swords"	Arulpragasam; Tevin Plaate; Jerry Leembruggen; Ruben Fernhout; Hirdesh Singh; Kaushal Sahil	M.I.A.; Spanker; The Partysquad	2:25
16.	"Talk"	Arulpragasam; Plaate; Leembruggen; Fernhout	Skrillex; Blaqstarr	2:14
17.	"Platforms"	Arulpragasam; Plaate; Leembruggen; Fernhout	M.I.A.; Spanker; The Partysquad	2:55
Total length:				54:13

=== Notes ===
- ^{^[a]} signifies a co-producer.
- ^{^[b]} signifies an additional producer.

== Charts ==
=== Weekly charts ===
Chart (2016)	Peak position
Australian Albums (ARIA)	51
Austrian Albums (Ö3 Austria)	74
Belgian Albums (Ultratop Flanders)	48
Belgian Albums (Ultratop Wallonia)	61
Canadian Albums (Billboard)	41
Dutch Albums (Album Top 100)	89
French Albums (SNEP)	55
German Albums (Offizielle Top 100)	55
New Zealand Albums (RMNZ)	26
Spanish Albums (Promusicae)	97
Swiss Albums (Schweizer Hitparade)	24
UK Albums (OCC)	63
UK R&B Albums (OCC)	6
US Billboard 200	66
US Top Dance Albums (Billboard)	1
US Top Rap Albums (Billboard)	4

=== Year-end charts ===
Chart (2016)	Position
US Dance/Electronic Albums (Billboard)	21
