= Freedun =

Single by M.I.A. featuring Zayn

from the album AIM
- Released: 2 September 2016
- Genre: R&B; pop; hip hop
- Length: 4:42
- Label: Interscope
- Songwriters: Maya Arulpragasam; Zayn Malik; Keisha Hollins; Jamal Jones
- Producers: Polow da Don; M.I.A.

M.I.A. singles chronology
"Bird Song" (2016)	"Freedun" (2016)	"P.O.W.A." (2017)

Zayn singles chronology
"Cruel" (2016)	"Freedun" (2016)	"I Don't Wanna Live Forever" (2016)

"Freedun" is a song by British rapper M.I.A., featuring English singer-songwriter Zayn, from her fifth studio album, AIM (2016). The song was produced by Polow da Don. Furthermore, Levi Lennox, who produced "Borders" from AIM, also produced Zayn's debut single "Pillowtalk". Lyrically, "Freedun" is politically influenced and references refugees, an undercurrent theme on AIM.

M.I.A. revealed she had been contacted by their mutual publisher to write a song for Zayn's debut solo album Mind of Mine. The song, however, never got past the demo stage and M.I.A then asked Zayn to feature on her own song which she had written a long time ago but always thought it was "too mainstream". The pair got in contact via WhatsApp, began working on the track during M.I.A.'s stay in India and completed it in the first week of August 2016. The song was originally called "Swagistan", as previewed on Periscope in May 2016.

M.I.A. announced the release of the single on 31 August 2016. It premiered on the Annie Mac BBC Radio One show on 1 September 2016, and then released the next day. "Freedun" debuted at number one on the UK Asian Music Chart and remained at the top for one more week.

== Critical reception ==
The song has received generally favorable reception from music critics. New Musical Express and The Independent chose the song as a highlight on the album. Some critics, however, called it "disappointingly generic" and a "misstep".

== Music video ==
M.I.A. filmed a music video for "Freedun" in the Himalayas in Nepal. During filming, she needed the aid of an oxygen tank because of the lack of oxygen in the mountains. Furthermore, she was unable to film the video with Zayn because she was denied visa to enter the United States and he was also unable to leave the country due to his commitments.

== Track listing ==
- Digital download
1. "Freedun" (featuring Zayn) – 4:42

== Charts ==
Chart (2016)	Peak position
UK Asian Music Chart (Official Charts Company)	1
US Twitter Top Tracks (Billboard)	4

== Release history ==
Region	Date	Format	Label	Ref
Worldwide	2 September 2016	Digital download; streaming	Interscope	
