= Go Off (M.I.A. song) =

Single by M.I.A.

from the album AIM
- Released: 15 July 2016
- Recorded: 2015–16
- Genre: Electronic; worldbeat
- Length: 3:05
- Label: Interscope
- Songwriters: Maya Arulpragasam; Sonny Moore; Charles Smith
- Producers: Skrillex; Blaqstarr; Tom Manaton

M.I.A. singles chronology
"Borders" (2015)	"Go Off" (2016)	"Bird Song" (2016)

Music video
- "Go Off" on YouTube

"Go Off" is a song by British recording artist M.I.A. from her fifth studio album, AIM (2016). The track was written by M.I.A., Skrillex, and Blaqstarr. Production was handled by the latter two, alongside Tom Manaton. The song premiered on Annie Mac's eponymous radio show on 14 July 2016 and was self-released worldwide the following day as a digital download under exclusive license to Interscope Records. The track was met with mixed reviews.

== Music video ==
The music video for the song was directed by M.I.A. herself. It only consists of a series of surface mining site explosions as M.I.A. has revealed she did not want to feature any human beings in the video.

== Charts ==
Chart (2016)	Peak position
France (SNEP)	82
UK Asian Music Chart (Official Charts Company)	2
US Dance/Electronic Digital Songs (Billboard)	14
US Hot Dance/Electronic Songs (Billboard)	25
US Twitter Top Tracks (Billboard)	29

== Release history ==
Region	Date	Format	Label	Ref
Worldwide	15 July 2016	Digital download; streaming	Interscope; Polydor; Universal	
Italy	29 July 2016	Contemporary hit radio	Universal	
