= Bird Song (M.I.A. song) =

2016 song performed by M.I.A.

- Blaqstarr version

Single by M.I.A.

from the album AIM
- Released: 12 August 2016 (Blaqstarr version); 18 August 2016 (Diplo version)
- Recorded: 2015–16
- Genre: Worldbeat
- Length: 3:01 (Blaqstarr version); 3:21 (Diplo version)
- Label: Interscope
- Songwriters: Maya Arulpragasam; Charles Smith
- Producers: Blaqstarr; Diplo

Diplo version
- Diplo version

M.I.A. singles chronology
"Go Off" (2016)	"Bird Song" (2016)	"Freedun" (2016)

"Bird Song" is a song by British recording artist M.I.A. from her fifth studio album, AIM (2016). It served as the fourth single from the album. M.I.A. announced the release of the single on 1 August 2016, and that the producers include Diplo and Blaqstarr. The song was written by M.I.A. and Blaqstarr, and was the first collaboration between Diplo and M.I.A. since her 2010 album Maya. The Blaqstarr version was officially released on 12 August 2016 while the release of the Diplo version was delayed due to clearance problems with Interscope, and eventually premiered on 18 August.

== Background and release ==
Blaqstarr is a frequent collaborator with M.I.A., previously working with her on "Go Off" along with Skrillex. Diplo and M.I.A. were previously speculated to have ended their professional relationship after the end of their romantic and personal relationship, but Diplo stated in an interview that he and M.I.A. still talk and maintain a professional relationship. "Bird Song" is M.I.A. and Diplo's first collaboration since 2010. Both versions sample Ilaiyaraaja's song "Oru Kili Uruguthu" from the 1983 Tamil film Aanandha Kummi and the lyrics name-check different birds.

M.I.A. released the Blaqstarr version of the song on 12 August 2016. During a Periscope stream on 13 August, she explained that the difference between the two versions was that the Diplo production was meant more as a dance song. She additionally stated that the labelling of the song as a "remix" was an error. M.I.A. later announced on her Instagram that the reason Diplo's version did not come out in time was because her label, Interscope, had yet to clear the song for release. She also stated that she wished to release it on 19 August 2016 and that if the song was not released by then, she would leak it. On 18 August 2016, M.I.A. revealed in another Periscope stream that the Diplo version was cleared for release and that it had been released on M.I.A.'s official Vevo account. It was previously hinted that only the Blaqstarr version would appear on the track list for her then-upcoming album AIM, however, the album ended up featuring both versions, albeit Diplo's version only on the deluxe edition.

== Release history ==
Region	Date	Format	Version	Label	Ref.
Worldwide	12 August 2016	Digital download; streaming	Blaqstarr version	Interscope	
Worldwide	18 August 2016	Digital download; streaming	Diplo version	Interscope	
