= Bang (Rye Rye song) =

Single by Rye Rye featuring M.I.A.

from the album Go! Pop! Bang! and Fast & Furious (soundtrack)
- Released: 31 March 2009
- Recorded: 2008
- Genre: Electronic; hip hop
- Length: 3:32
- Label: N.E.E.T.; Interscope
- Songwriters: Ryeisha Berrain; Maya Arulpragasam; Charles Smith
- Producer: Blaqstarr

Rye Rye featuring M.I.A. singles chronology
"Bang" (2009)	"Sunshine" (2010)

Bang (The Remixes)

EP by Rye Rye featuring M.I.A.
- Released: June 2, 2009: iTunes; Amazon.com
- Genre: Electronic
- Labels: N.E.E.T.; Interscope

"Bang" is a song and single by rapper/dancer Rye Rye featuring M.I.A. It was recorded in 2008 and appears on the deluxe version of her 2012 album Go! Pop! Bang!. It was released in 2009 on N.E.E.T. Recordings and Interscope Records. The single was released first, followed by an EP of remixes, Bang – The Remixes, which includes remixes by Buraka Som Sistema and DJ Sega. The song appears in the films Fast & Furious and Step Up 3D and in the episode "The Sorkin Notes" of the TV-series Entourage.

== Music video ==
The video features Rye Rye, M.I.A. and several Baltimore club dancers including Whyte Boi dancing in a dark, messy underground club setting. The video was directed by M.I.A. in Baltimore.

== Track listings and formats ==
"Bang (feat. M.I.A.)" CD EP

1. Bang (Main Version) [feat. M.I.A.] - 3:33
2. Bang (Clean Version) [feat. M.I.A.] – 3:33
3. Bang (Instrumental) – 3:30
4. Bang (Acapella) [feat. M.I.A.] – 3:33

"Bang (feat. M.I.A.) - Single"

1. Bang (feat. M.I.A.) - 03:32

"Bang (The Remixes) [feat. M.I.A.] - EP"

1. Bang (WTF I Asked For a Kuduro Remix) [feat. M.I.A.] – 03:59
2. Bang (Buraka Carnival Remix) [feat. M.I.A.] – 05:28
3. Bang (DJ Sega's Philly Club Remix) [feat. M.I.A.] – 04:06
4. Bang (feat. M.I.A.) - 3:33
5. Bang (Instrumental) - 3:30
6. Bang (Acapella) [feat. M.I.A.] - 3:33

== Reception ==
Rolling Stone said of the song "This gloriously showoffy track from M.I.A.'s speedrapping protégée features a monstrously syncopated break beat – it's hotter than a blonde and a brunette double-teaming an ice cream cone. This spare, cheap-effects jam from M.I.A.'s protégée is a hot early hip-hop throwback. Best is Rye Rye's voice: high-pitched like a chipmunk but not cuddly. 'Throw your fucking sets up!' she yells. Why not?" Seattle Weekly heralded the raw energy that Rye Rye captured in the song and the video, saying "Unlike a lot of music videos that portray a fantastical and glamorous lifestyle, Rye Rye injects edginess and grit that embody a real life feel."

== Credits ==
- Mixed By – Arabian Prince, The Egyptian Lover, M.I.A.
- Producer – Blaqstarr
- Recorded By – Aaron Dahl, Blaqstarr, M.I.A.
