= Sunshine (Rye Rye song) =

2010 single by Rye Rye featuring M.I.A.

Single by Rye Rye featuring M.I.A.

from the album Go! Pop! Bang!
- Released: October 5, 2010
- Recorded: 2008
- Genre: Electronic
- Length: 3:22
- Label: N.E.E.T. Recordings, Interscope Records
- Songwriter(s): Ryeisha Berrain; Maya Arulpragasam
- Producer(s): M.I.A.

Rye Rye featuring M.I.A. singles chronology
"Bang" (2009)	"Sunshine" (2010)	"Never Will Be Mine" (2011)

Sunshine (The Remixes)

EP by Rye Rye featuring M.I.A.
- Released: November 2, 2010 (digital); November 22, 2010 (physical)
- Genre: Electronic
- Label: N.E.E.T.; Interscope
- Producer: M.I.A.

"Sunshine" is a song and single by rapper/dancer Rye Rye featuring M.I.A. It was recorded in 2008 and released in 2010 and serves as the first single from her debut album Go! Pop! Bang! (2012). The release on N.E.E.T. Recordings (via Interscope Records) was followed by an extended play of remixes, including work by The Cataracs, 12th Planet, MSTRKRFT, and L.A. Riots. The song also appeared in the episode "While You Weren't Sleeping" of the TV series Gossip Girl. and The Bling Ring.

== Music video ==
'The clip celebrates Rye Rye's urban upbringing, with b-girl dance moves, double dutching, and pick-up games. The video is the second video of Rye Rye's to feature M.I.A., after her debut video "Bang". Contrary to sources' claims, the video was not shot in Rye Rye's hometown of Baltimore instead the video was shot by director Jess Holzworth, in the Greenpoint area of Brooklyn, NY.

== Track listings and formats ==
=== Single ===
1. "Sunshine" (featuring M.I.A.) – 3:22

=== The Remixes EP ===
1. "Sunshine" (JFK of MSTRKRFT Remix) [featuring M.I.A.] – 3:57
2. "Sunshine" (12th Planet Remix) [featuring M.I.A.] – 3:12
3. "Sunshine" (L.A. Riots Remix) [featuring M.I.A.] – 7:15
4. "Sunshine" (The Cataracs Remix) [featuring M.I.A.] – 2:50

== Credits ==
- Producer – M.I.A.
- Mixed by Egyptian Lover
- Recorded by M.I.A.
