= New Thing (Rye Rye song) =

Single by Rye Rye

from the album Go! Pop! Bang!
- Released: July 1, 2011
- Recorded: 2011
- Genre: Electronic
- Length: 2:37
- Label: N.E.E.T.; Interscope
- Songwriters: Ryeisha Barrein; Maya Arulpragasam; Shawn Breathwaite; John O'Brien
- Producers: J.O.B.; MadV; Ryan Origin

Rye Rye singles chronology
"Never Will Be Mine" (2010)	"New Thing" (2011)	"Jello" (2011)

"New Thing" is a song and single by musician Rye Rye. It was recorded and released in 2011 by N.E.E.T. Recordings and Interscope Records with an accompanying music video. The song's release precedes the release of her debut album Go! Pop! Bang!. "New Thing" appears as a promo for designer Prabal Gurung's 2012 Resort Collection and in the 2011 Adidas "Women Go All In" advert. The song samples lyrics from the song "Sunshowers" by M.I.A. Gurung, who cites Rye Rye as his muse, wanted the artist to showcase his work "in a way that highlighted its bright and graphic elements".

== Music video ==
The music video premiered on Stylelist. It subsequently premiered on VEVO and YouTube on July 1, 2011. The video features Rye Rye and several dancers dancing Baltimore club dance moves on a stage, with lights in the background and clothes inspired by Gurung's line. Gurung wanted Rye Rye, an early muse of the designer to showcase his designs in the video, for he felt the musician's unique style, graphics and music complimented his work. In other scenes, Rye Rye dances and rap/sings to the camera with different backdrops.

== Credits ==
- Vocals, songwriting - Rye Rye
