= Y.A.L.A. =

2013 song by M.I.A.

Single by M.I.A.

from the album Matangi
- Released: 22 October 2013
- Genre: Electronic; dance
- Length: 4:23
- Label: Interscope
- Songwriters: Maya Arulpragasam; Ruben Fernhout; Jerry Leembruggen
- Producer: The Partysquad

M.I.A. singles chronology
"Come Walk with Me" (2013)	"Y.A.L.A." (2013)	"Double Bubble Trouble" (2014)

Music video
- "Y.A.L.A." on YouTube

"Y.A.L.A." is a song by recording artist M.I.A. from her fourth album Matangi, released in 2013. It was released as the fourth single from the album. The track was written by M.I.A. together with Ruben Fernhout and Jerry Leembruggen of the Dutch production team The Partysquad who also produced the track.

The song's title stands for "You Always Live Again", which was seen as a response to the slogan "Y.O.L.O." ("You Only Live Once"), popularised by rapper Drake in his 2011 song "The Motto". The track refers to reincarnation and karma, some of the concepts relating to Hinduism that M.I.A. has incorporated into the album. The lyrics also reference Fidel Castro, Cristiano Ronaldo, offshore banking and Julianne Moore.

"Y.A.L.A." was previewed on singer's SoundCloud account on 16 October, and subsequently made available for download on 22 October 2013 upon pre-ordering Matangi. The song served as the fourth single from the album. It was performed on The Colbert Report, Late Night with Conan O'Brien, and the Matangi Tour.

The track was met with mostly positive feedback. AllMusic picked "Y.A.L.A." as one of the highlights on the album.

== Music video ==
The music video for the track was commissioned by British magazine i-D and directed by German photographer Daniel Sannwald. It was premiered on 15 November 2013 on i-D's YouTube channel.

== Track listing ==
Digital download

1. "Y.A.L.A." – 4:23

== Charts ==
=== Weekly charts ===
Chart (2013–14)	Peak position
US Dance/Electronic Digital Songs (Billboard)	11
US Dance/Electronic Songs (Billboard)	19

=== Year-end charts ===
Chart (2014)	Position
US Hot Dance/Electronic Songs	96
