= Bring the Noize =

Single by M.I.A.

from the album Matangi
- Released: 18 June 2013
- Genre: Dance; hip hop; worldbeat; electroclash
- Length: 3:23 (single version); 4:35 (album version)
- Label: Interscope
- Songwriters: Maya Arulpragasam; Benoit Heitz; Dave Taylor; Jean-Baptiste de Laubier; Hugues Rez
- Producers: Switch; Surkin

M.I.A. singles chronology
"Give Me All Your Luvin'" (2012)	"Bring the Noize" (2013)	"Come Walk with Me" (2013)

Music video
- "Bring the Noize" on YouTube

"Bring the Noize" is a hip-hop song by British recording artist M.I.A. from her fourth studio album, Matangi (2013). The track was written by Maya "M.I.A." Arulpragasam, Surkin, Switch, Para One and Hugues Rey, and produced by Switch and Surkin. It references Public Enemy's 1987 song "Bring the Noise" and Janis Joplin's track "Me and Bobby McGee".

The track was first previewed in March 2013 as part of Matangi Mix used as the soundtrack to Kenzo's fashion show in Paris. The single was self-released worldwide as a digital download, under exclusive license to Interscope Records, on 18 June 2013, as the second single from the album. "Bring the Noize" was performed at the Glastonbury Festival 2014 and during the Matangi Tour.

The single's cover features Sri Yantra and a little Om sign in the top right corner.

== Critical response ==
The song received positive feedback from critics. Rolling Stone gave it four out of five stars and its production was praised by Slate as "terrific". Stereogum named "Bring the Noize" one of M.I.A.'s 10 best songs.

== Music video ==
The music video for the song was commissioned by Noisey, part of the Vice network. It was directed by Ben Newman and filmed in 2 days in London. The clip was released on 25 June 2013 on Noisey's website and YouTube channel. A gold-filtered version of the video, dubbed 'Matangi Gold Edition', was released two days later. On 7 November 2016, a day before the 2016 United States presidential election, M.I.A.'s former label Roc Nation removed the video from Noisey's YouTube channel for including the word "WikiLeaks", claiming that the song was released while she was under the label and it had rights over it. The video was eventually re-uploaded on M.I.A.'s Vevo on 17 November 2016 under the title "Bring The Noize (Matangi Street Edition)".

== Track listing ==
Digital download

1. "Bring the Noize" – 3:23

Promo CD

1. "Bring the Noize" (Explicit) – 3:24
2. "Bring the Noize" (Edited) – 3:24
3. "Bring the Noize" (Instrumental) – 3:17

== Charts ==
Chart (2013)	Peak position
Australia (ARIA)	163

== Release history ==
Region	Date	Format	Label
Worldwide	18 June 2013	Digital download, streaming	Interscope
