= Double Bubble Trouble =

Single by M.I.A.

from the album Matangi
- Released: 30 May 2014
- Recorded: 2013; Jungle City Studios (New York City)
- Genre: World; EDM; reggae; trap
- Length: 2:59
- Label: Interscope
- Songwriters: Maya "M.I.A." Arulpragasam; Ruben Fernhout; Jerry Leembruggen; Rypke Westra
- Producer: The Partysquad

M.I.A. singles chronology
"Y.A.L.A." (2013)	"Double Bubble Trouble" (2014)	"Sexodus" (2015)

Music video
- "Double Bubble Trouble" on YouTube

"Double Bubble Trouble" is a song by recording artist M.I.A. from her fourth studio album, Matangi (2013). It is written by Maya "M.I.A." Arulpragasam, Ruben Fernhout, Jerry Leembruggen, and produced by DJ Punish (Richard Westra). The track references Shampoo's 1994 hit song "Trouble", and incorporates such musical styles as reggae, trap and kuduro. "Double Bubble Trouble" was released as a promotional single in the Netherlands in 2013 and Sweden, before becoming the fifth and final official single from Matangi in 2014. The song was performed on Late Night with Seth Meyers on 13 May 2014 as well as on the 2014 Matangi Tour. The song is on the soundtrack of the 2023 movie The Marvels.

== Critical response ==
"Double Bubble Trouble" received generally positive feedback from music critics. Hugh Montgomery of The Independent named it one of Matangi's "sublime, fully formed songs" while Jesal 'Jay Soul' Padania of RapReviews.com stated that the song is "fucking crazy and completely epic". However, in his PopMatters review, Arnold Pan was less enthusiastic, and while appreciating the song's "globetrotting" blend of "dub reggae rhythms, Indian strings, and hip-hop conventions", he also claimed that M.I.A. has "done similar things to more dazzling effect before, since there's less development here as she moves between these traditions rather than weaving them together more intricately".

== Chart performance ==
When released as a single in 2014, "Double Bubble Trouble" failed to impact music charts. However, the track had charted in France in November 2013, solely on individual downloads from its parent album.

== Music video ==
On 10 April 2014, the singer reached out to her fans on Facebook and Twitter, explaining that she needed identical twins for "Double Bubble Trouble" video shoot, which she said would take place in London on 11 and 12 April. The music video for the song was directed by M.I.A. herself on location in Peckham, South London.

The video begins with adolescents printing weapons using a three dimensional printer. It also features scenes of M.I.A. posing against the wall with '1984 is now' written on it, referencing George Orwell's novel Nineteen Eighty-Four, as well as Barack Obama's 2008 campaign slogan 'Yes We Can' modified into 'Yes We Scan', which alludes to scanning and storing personal web information by Google. The Partysquad, who produced the song, also make a cameo appearance in the music video.

M.I.A. premiered the video on 19 May 2014, tweeting a link to it, and revealed that her record label Universal Music Group had been holding the video for four days and would not let the singer release it. When M.I.A. published the clip on YouTube herself, the label blocked it on copyright grounds, but reversed the decision when faced with an outpouring of protest. The video went viral and quickly reached 2m views on YouTube. It has been noted and praised for its political undertones.

== Track listing ==
Digital download

1. "Double Bubble Trouble" – 2:59

== Charts ==
Chart (2013)	Peak position
France (SNEP)	179
US Dance/Electronic Songs (Billboard)	37
