= Come Walk with Me (song) =

Single by M.I.A.

from the album Matangi
- Released: 3 September 2013
- Genre: Dance; worldbeat
- Length: 4:47
- Label: Interscope
- Songwriters: Maya Arulpragasam; Dave Taylor
- Producer: Switch

M.I.A. singles chronology
"Bring the Noize" (2013)	"Come Walk with Me" (2013)	"Y.A.L.A." (2013)

Music video
- "Come Walk with Me" on YouTube

"Come Walk with Me" is a song by the British recording artist M.I.A. for her fourth studio album, Matangi (2013). The track was written by Maya "M.I.A." Arulpragasam and Switch, and produced by the latter. M.I.A. first uploaded a demo of the track online in April 2012, and the final version of the song was self-released worldwide as a digital download, under exclusive license to Interscope Records, on 3 September 2013. The song was the third single from the album, and was performed the on The Colbert Report, Late Night with Jimmy Fallon, the 2013 YouTube Music Awards and during the Matangi Tour. "Come Walk with Me" was met with acclaim from music critics.

== Music video ==
No music video was produced for the song, but a lyric video was uploaded to YouTube and Vevo to accompany the release. The clip illustrates the story of Krishna and includes various Hindu deities. It has been described as "insane" and as "a karaoke video on acid".

== Track listing ==
Digital download

1. "Come Walk with Me" – 4:47

== Charts ==
Chart (2013)	Peak position
US Dance/Electronic Songs (Billboard)	39

== Release history ==
Region	Date	Format	Label
Worldwide	3 September 2013	Digital download, streaming	Interscope
