= Never Will Be Mine =

2011 single by Rye Rye

Single by Rye Rye featuring Robyn

from the album Go! Pop! Bang!
- Released: June 7, 2011
- Genre: Electronic; hip hop
- Length: 3:24
- Label: N.E.E.T.; Interscope
- Songwriters: R. Barrein; R. Carlsson; K. Åhlund; M. Kierszenbaum
- Producer: Cherry Cherry Boom Boom

Rye Rye singles chronology
"Sunshine" (2010)	"Never Will Be Mine" (2011)	"New Thing" (2011)

Robyn singles chronology
"Call Your Girlfriend" (2011)	"Never Will Be Mine" (2011)	"Do It Again" (2014)

Music video
- "Never Will Be Mine" on YouTube

Never Will Be Mine (The Remixes)

EP by Rye Rye featuring Robyn
- Released: August 9, 2011 (Digital)
- Genre: Electronic; dance; house
- Label: N.E.E.T.; Interscope

"Never Will Be Mine" is a song by rapper Rye Rye featuring Swedish singer Robyn. Released in 2011 the song serves as the second single from her debut album Go! Pop! Bang!, appearing on the deluxe edition, whilst the R3hab remix appears on the standard edition. The song samples the chorus of Robyn's previous hit single "Be Mine!". Its release on N.E.E.T. Recordings and Interscope Records was followed by a music video directed by Tim Nackashi. On August 11, 2011 the song debut at number 49 on the US Billboard Dance Charts.

== Reception ==
Rolling Stone described the song as a "hip-hop ballad that showcases a sweeter, more tender side of the rapper, who is typically more bouncy and exuberant. The tempo is a bit slower than usual for both ladies, but they can't help but hit the stage with a lot of enthusiasm and energy." Robyn commented that she appreciated how Rye Rye took a sad, ballad song and interpolated it into a different style in a "Behind The Scenes" documentary.

== Music video ==
Directed by Tim Nackashi and released on June 15, 2011, the music video for "Never Will Be Mine" has been described as a 'summer slow jam with some surprise glitches and turns along the way'. The video sees Rye Rye, accompanied by Robyn, lamenting over lost love as she walks through the graffiti strewn streets of Los Angeles. The collaboration has proved popular, gaining over 1.7 million views under a week.

== Track listings and formats ==
Never Will Be Mine (feat. Robyn) - Single

1. "Never Will Be Mine (feat. Robyn)" – 3:24

Never Will Be Mine (Kat Krazy Remix) [feat. Robyn] - Single

1. "Never Will Be Mine (Kat Krazy Remix) [feat. Robyn]" - 3:37

Never Will Be Mine (The Remixes) [feat. Robyn]

1. "Never Will Be Mine (Fedde Le Grand Dub) [feat. Robyn]" - 7:35
2. "Never Will Be Mine (Fedde Le Grand Vocal Club Remix) [feat. Robyn]" - 7:35
3. "Never Will Be Mine (Kill the Noise Club Remix) [feat. Robyn]" - 4:44
4. "Never Will Be Mine (R3hab Club Remix) [feat. Robyn]" - 4:16
5. "Never Will Be Mine (R3hab Radio Edit) [feat. Robyn]" - 3:10
6. "Never Will Be Mine (Burns Club Remix) [feat. Robyn]" - 5:50
7. "Never Will Be Mine (Moguai Remix) [feat. Robyn]" - 6:49
8. "Never Will Be Mine (Mia Moretti + Caitlin Moe 4 On Da Floor Remix) [feat. Robyn]" - 4:15
9. "Never Will Be Mine (Kat Krazy Club Remix) [feat. Robyn]" - 4:08
10. "Never Will Be Mine (Kat Krazy Radio Edit) [feat. Robyn]" - 3:37
11. "Never Will Be Mine (Kill the Noise Dub) [feat. Robyn]" - 4:31
12. "Never Will Be Mine (Burns Radio Edit) [feat. Robyn]" - 4:15
13. "Never Will Be Mine (Kat Krazy Dub) [feat. Robyn]" - 4:08

== Chart performance ==
Chart (2011)	Peak position
US Hot Dance Club Songs (Billboard)	12

== Release history ==
Release dates and formats for "Never Will Be Mine"
Region	Date	Format	Label(s)	Ref.
United States	August 16, 2011	Mainstream airplay	Interscope	
