= Jello (song) =

2011 single by Far East Movement

Single by Far East Movement featuring Rye Rye
- Released: November 1, 2011
- Genre: Hip house
- Length: 2:52
- Label: Interscope
- Songwriters: Jonathan Yip; Jeremy Reeves; Ray Romulus; Nathan Walker; Jae Choung; James Roh; Kevin Nishimura; Virman Coquia
- Producers: The Stereotypes; Ra Charm

Far East Movement singles chronology
"If I Was You (OMG)" (2011)	"Jello" (2011)	"Live My Life" (2012)

Rye Rye singles chronology
"New Thing" (2011)	"Jello" (2011)	"Boom Boom" (2012)

Music video
- "Jello" on YouTube

"Jello" is a song by Asian-American hip hop group Far East Movement, released in the United States on 1 November 2011, initially as the lead single from their upcoming fourth studio album Dirty Bass. However, due to poor charting the song was later cut from the album. The song was produced by the Stereotypes and features rapper Rye Rye. The hook of the song interpolates part of Pimp C's verse of the song "Big Pimpin'" by Jay-Z.

== Music video ==
A music video to accompany the release of "Jello" was first released onto YouTube on 19 January 2012, at a total length of three minutes and six seconds.

== Live performances ==
On February 9, 2012, Far East Movement performed the song on Jimmy Kimmel Live!

== Credits and personnel ==
- Lead vocals – Far East Movement & Rye Rye
- Producers – Stereotypes
- Lyrics – Jonathan Yip, Jeremy Reeves, Ray Romulus, Nathan Walker, James Roh, Kevin Nishimura, Virman Coquia, Jae Choung
- Label: Interscope Records

== Charts ==
Peak chart positions of "Jello"
Chart (2012)	Peak position
Belgium (Ultratip Bubbling Under Flanders)	72

== Release history ==
Country	Date	Format	Label
United States	1 November 2011	Digital download	Interscope Records
