= Fast & Furious (soundtrack) =

Soundtrack to the 2009 action film Fast & Furious

Fast & Furious (Original Motion Picture Soundtrack)

Soundtrack album by various artists
- Released: March 31, 2009
- Recorded: 2007–09
- Length: 40:32
- Labels: Star Trak; Interscope
- Producers: Pharrell Williams; Yaneley Arty; The Neptunes; Armando Rosario; Blaqstarr; Federico Franchi; J Drew Sheard II; Kenna; Lil' Jon

Singles from Fast & Furious
- 1. "Krazy" Released: September 30, 2008; 2. "Virtual Diva" Released: February 3, 2009; 3. "Blanco" Released: March 24, 2009; 4. "Bang" Released: July 3, 2009

Professional ratings
Review scores
Source	Rating
AllMusic	3/5 stars

Fast & Furious: Original Motion Picture Soundtrack is the soundtrack to Justin Lin's 2009 action film Fast & Furious. It was released on March 31, 2009 via Star Trak Entertainment and Interscope Records. Production was primarily handled by The Neptunes. It features contributions from Pitbull, Pharrell Williams, Busta Rhymes, Don Omar, Kenna, Lil' Jon, M.I.A., Natasha Ramos, Robin Thicke, Rye Rye, Shark City Click and Tego Calderón.

== Track listing ==
No.	Title	Writer(s)	Producer(s)	Length
1.	"Bang" (performed by Rye Rye featuring M.I.A.)	Ryeisha Berrain; Maya Arulpragasam; Charles Jamal Smith	Blaqstarr	3:32
2.	"G-Stro" (performed by Busta Rhymes)	Trevor Smith; Pharrell Williams	The Neptunes	3:41
3.	"Loose Wires" (performed by Kenna)	Kenna Zemedkun; Williams	The Neptunes; Kenna	3:46
4.	"Blanco" (performed by Pitbull featuring Pharrell Williams)	Armando Perez; Williams	The Neptunes	3:22
5.	"Krazy" (performed by Pitbull featuring Lil' Jon)	Perez; Jonathan Smith; Federico Franchi	Lil' Jon; Federico Franchi	3:52
6.	"You Slip, She Grip" (performed by Pitbull and Tego Calderón)	Tegui Calderón Rosario; Perez; Williams	The Neptunes	3:12
7.	"Head Bust" (performed by Shark City Click featuring Pharrell Williams)	Nathaniel Johnson; Williams	The Neptunes	3:55
8.	"Bad Girls" (performed by Pitbull featuring Robin Thicke)	Perez; Robin Thicke; Williams	The Neptunes	4:03
9.	"Virtual Diva" (performed by Don Omar)	William Landrón; Armando Rosario	Armando "Diesel" Rosario	4:00
10.	"La Isla Bonita" (performed by Natasha Ramos)	Madonna Louise Ciccone; Bruce Gaitsch; Patrick Leonard	J. Drew Sheard II	3:46
11.	"Blanco (The Spanish Version)" (performed by Pitbull featuring Pharrell Williams)	Perez; Williams	The Neptunes	3:23
Total length:				40:32

== Charts ==
Chart (2009)	Peak position
Australian Albums (ARIA)	37
Austrian Albums (Ö3 Austria)	9
Belgian Albums (Ultratop Flanders)	49
Belgian Albums (Ultratop Wallonia)	84
French Albums (SNEP)	120
German Albums (Offizielle Top 100)	35
Mexican Albums (Top 100 Mexico)	15
Swiss Albums (Schweizer Hitparade)	25
US Billboard 200	116

== Original Motion Picture Score ==
Fast & Furious (Original Motion Picture Score)

Film score by Brian Tyler
- Released: April 28, 2009
- Recorded: 2008
- Studios: Newman Scoring Stage, 20th Century Fox Studio
- Genre: Film score
- Length: 78:11
- Label: Varèse Sarabande
- Producer: Brian Tyler

Brian Tyler chronology
Dragonball Evolution (2009)	Fast & Furious (2009)	The Final Destination (2009)

Fast & Furious (Original Motion Picture Score) is the film score album for the film, composed by Brian Tyler, who returned from Tokyo Drift (2006). The album, with a total of 25 tracks, was released on CD by Varèse Sarabande with 78 minutes and 11 seconds' worth of music.

=== Track listing ===
No.	Title	Length
1.	"Landtrain"	6:25
2.	"Fast And Furious"	2:10
3.	"The Border"	3:21
4.	"Letty"	2:14
5.	"The Tunnel"	3:35
6.	"Amends"	2:47
7.	"Dom VS Brian"	6:52
8.	"Hanging With Dom"	2:29
9.	"Suite"	4:03
10.	"Revenge"	2:33
11.	"Accelerator"	2:05
12.	"Vaya Con Dios"	2:01
13.	"In The Name Of The Father"	4:21
14.	"Outta Sight"	3:00
15.	"Brian And Mia"	3:18
16.	"Tracer"	2:05
17.	"Letty's Cell Phone"	3:44
18.	"Real Drivers"	2:30
19.	"Fate"	4:29
20.	"The Exchange"	4:15
21.	"No Goodbyes"	1:23
22.	"Vengeance"	2:57
23.	"Memorial"	1:42
24.	"The Showdown"	2:05
25.	"Judgement"	1:47
Total length:		78:11
