= Harlan & Alondra =

Studio album by Buddy
- Released: July 20, 2018
- Genre: Hip hop; R&B; G-funk
- Length: 39:30
- Label: RCA
- Producer: Brody Brown & David Waltzer (also exec.); Mike & Keys & Roofeo (also exec.); DJ Khalil; Flying Lotus; HazeBanga; Isiah Salazar; Jahaan Sweet; Jake One; Roofeeo; Scoop DeVille; Scum; Terrace Martin; Thundercat

Buddy chronology
Magnolia (2017)	Harlan & Alondra (2018)

Singles from Harlan & Alondra
- 1. "Black" Released: March 7, 2018; 2. "Trouble on Central" Released: May 10, 2018; 3. "Hey Up There" Released: June 20, 2018; 4. "Trippin'" Released: July 9, 2018

Harlan & Alondra is the debut studio album by American rapper Buddy. It was released on July 20, 2018, by RCA Records.

== Background ==
The album was produced by Mike & Keys, Brody Brown, Roofeeo, Jake One, DJ Khalil, and Jahaan Sweet, Scoop DeVille. Guest features include ASAP Ferg, Ty Dolla Sign, Snoop Dogg, Khalid and Guapdad 4000.

== Singles ==
On March 7, 2018, Buddy released the first single from titled "Black", with an accompanying music video coming out the following week. On May 10, the second single "Trouble on Central" was released, and a video after the album's release. In June and July, he put out two more songs, "Hey Up There" and "Trippin'", to further promote the project.

== Critical reception ==
Professional ratings
Aggregate scores
Source	Rating
Metacritic	83/100
Review scores
Source	Rating
Pitchfork	7.4/10

Writing for Pitchfork, Briana Younger said "Buddy emerges as one of the region’s most versatile artists. Like a bluesman who still believes things get better, he offsets their often weighty revelations masked in revelry with something that feels more soothing. Part conversation and part confessional, Harlan & Alondra is an alternative take on one of pop culture’s most fabled cities. Buddy drops the top and extends an invitation to ride with him, reminding us along the way that though it may not always be sunny by the beach, it’s always worthwhile."

The album was included in Clash's Albums of the Year 2018 list, placing it at #25, as well as in Vibe's unranked 30 Best Albums of 2018 list.

== Track listing ==
Credits adapted from Tidal

No.	Title	Writer(s)	Producer(s)	Length
1.	"Real Life Shit"	Simmie Sims III; Christopher "Brody" Brown; Terrace Martin	Brody Brown; Martin^{[a]}	4:09
2.	"Shameless" (featuring Guapdad 4000)	Sims III; Akeem Hayes; Michael Cox, Jr.; John Groover, Jr.; Jacob Dutton	Mike & Keys; Jake One	4:02
3.	"Black" (featuring ASAP Ferg)	Sims III; Darold Ferguson, Jr.; Jahaan Sweet; Sir Darryl Farris	Sweet	3:53
4.	"Hey Up There" (featuring Ty Dolla Sign)	Sims III; Tyrone Griffin, Jr.; Khalid "Kent Jamz" Muhammad; Rashad Muhammad; Isiah Salazar	HazeBanga; Salazar	3:21
5.	"Legend"	Sims III; Cox, Jr.; Groover, Jr.; Japhet Landis; Martin	Mike & Keys; Brown; Roofeeo; Martin^{[a]}	0:46
6.	"Trouble on Central"	Sims III; Elijah Molina; Landis; Brown; Farris	Scoop DeVille; Roofeeo; Brown^{[a]}	3:07
7.	"The Blue" (featuring Snoop Dogg)	Sims III; Calvin Broadus, Jr.; Cox, Jr.; Groover, Jr.; Landis; Brown; Martin	Mike & Keys; Roofeeo; Brown; Martin^{[a]}	3:25
8.	"Speechless"	Sims III; Cox, Jr.; Groover, Jr.; Brown; Landis	Mike & Keys; Brown; Roofeeo	3:19
9.	"Young"	Sims III; Cox, Jr.; Groover, Jr.; Brown; Landis; Erika Wright; Antwan Patton; Andre Benjamin; Thomas Callaway; Joi Gilliam; Ruben Wright; Myrna Crenshaw	Mike & Keys; Brown; Roofeeo	3:24
10.	"Trippin'" (featuring Khalid)	Sims III; Khalid Robinson; Cox, Jr.; Groover, Jr.; Landis; Brown	Mike & Keys; Roofeeo; Brown	3:00
11.	"Find Me 2"	Sims III; Landis; Brown	Roofeeo; Brown; Scum^{[a]}	3:22
12.	"Shine"	Sims III; Cox, Jr.; Groover, Jr.; Khalil Abdul-Rahman; Daniel Tannenbaum; Sam Barsh; David Foreman	Mike & Keys; DJ Khalil	3:46
Total length:				39:30

Harlan & Alondra (Deluxe)
No.	Title	Writer(s)	Producer(s)	Length
13.	"Cubicle" (featuring 03 Greedo)	Sims III; Jason Jackson		2:57
14.	"It's Love"	Sims III		3:59
15.	"Link Up" (featuring Kent Jamz, Bas, Guapdad 4000, JID, and Ari Lennox)	Sims III; K. Muhammad; Abbas Hamad; Hayes; Destin Route; Courtney Salter	Thundercat; Flying Lotus	3:10
16.	"Bad Attitude"	Sims III; Brown; Landis	Brown; Roofeeo	3:18

Notes

- ^{^[a]} signifies a co-producer
- "Real Life Shit", "Legend", "Speechless" and "Young" features background vocals from Rose Gold
- "Hey Up There" features background vocals from Kent Jamz
- "Trouble on Central" features background vocals from Joyce Wrice
- "The Blue" features background vocals from Quiñ and Terrace Martin
- "Young" interpolates "Liberation" performed by Outkast, Cee-Lo and Erykah Badu
