= Borders (M.I.A. song) =

2015 single by M.I.A.

Single by M.I.A.

from the album AIM
- Released: 20 November 2015
- Genre: Electronic; hip hop; world; trap
- Length: 4:11
- Label: Interscope
- Songwriters: Maya Arulpragasam; Amish Patel; Levi Lennox
- Producers: ADP; Lennox

M.I.A. singles chronology
"Swords" (2015)	"Borders" (2015)	"Go Off" (2016)

Music video
- "Borders" on YouTube

Professional ratings
Review scores
Source	Rating
411MANIA	8/10 stars
Billboard	3/5 stars
Renowned for Sound	3/5 stars

"Borders" is a song by recording artist M.I.A. for her fifth studio album, AIM (2016). The track was written by M.I.A., Levi Lennox and Amish Patel, and has been described as an electronic song incorporating such musical styles as hip hop and world music.

M.I.A. reportedly wrote "Borders" in two hours, which is the quickest she has ever written a song. Lyrically, the song references current world problems and reflects on popular culture.

The single was made available for online streaming on 20 November 2015, but was pulled later the same day. It was released globally as a digital single on 27 November 2015, accompanied by its socially and politically charged music video which went viral and sparked controversy. Time magazine has named it one of the best videos of 2015. The song is also used in the credits of 2017 action-adventure video game Uncharted: The Lost Legacy.

== Critical reception ==
"Borders" received mixed to positive feedback from music critics. The song and its lyrics have been described as "simplistic" while the track's verses where the phrase "what's up with that?" is repeated several times, have been referred to as both "extremely repetitive" and "undeniably catchy".

HotNewHipHop gave the track a 'Hottttt' rating, noting similarities to M.I.A.'s biggest hit to date, "Paper Planes".

== Chart performance ==
The track entered the top 40 in Dance/Electronic charts and Twitter songs chart in the US, but did not impact mainstream music charts in any country except in France.

== Music video ==
=== Background and synopsis ===
The video for the song was filmed in India, directed and edited by M.I.A. in collaboration with Sugu Arulpragasam and Tom Manaton. It tackles the issue of the 2015 European migrant crisis. The singer has a long history of speaking about the struggles of refugees in her music, which goes back as far as to her debut album, 2005's Arular. A former refugee herself, she relocated from the war-torn Sri Lanka to London with her family at the age of 10. M.I.A. revealed that none of the people appearing in the video were actors, but "real people" she acquired through street-casting and approaching actual refugee camps in the south of India where Sri Lankan Tamils live.

It was released on 27 November 2015, a week after the track premiered online, exclusively on Apple Music. It was her second video which Apple had an exclusivity to, after the double clip "Swords"/"Warriors" released earlier that year. M.I.A. dedicated the video to her uncle Bala, who had saved her family by helping them migrate from Sri Lanka to England. He died two days after the release of the video.

The video begins showing all-male South Asian refugees as they run through the desert and climb wire fences which replicate Melilla border fence, with M.I.A. performing the song in front of the scenes. The men then spell out the word 'LIFE' with their bodies across the fence. In subsequent scenes, the refugees are seen forming a boat with a pyramid in the middle, and crowd on to small boats, accompanied by the singer. The final scenes picture M.I.A. and some of the men sitting on rocks by the sea, wrapped in gold Mylar blankets. The video ends with the refugees wading into the sea.

=== Reception and controversies ===
The clip went viral and was met with positive feedback, having been described as "impressive", "beautiful" and "visually stunning".

M.I.A. has revealed that the reaction to the video has been "extreme" and that she has received a lot of hate from the Neo-Nazi groups claiming she is promoting "white genocide". On the other hand, some accused her of objectifying and using people of colour as props.

The fact itself that M.I.A. launched the video in partnership with Apple was the subject of further critical comments. Kelsey McKinney of Fusion.net wrote: "It seems incredibly ironic that she's singing "fuck the system" lyrics while the logo for one of the biggest, most profitable companies in the world hovers just to her right."

In the video, M.I.A. is seen wearing the official T-shirt of the French football club Paris Saint-Germain, with the original words "Fly Emirates" modified to "Fly Pirates". In January 2016, it emerged that the club had threatened to sue the singer for using their logo in such context, and demanded she take the video down. M.I.A. went on to publish their complaint letter on Twitter. She later stated she did not try to specifically target PSG, explaining that the only reason she used the T-shirt was because she has friends in Paris. Eventually, no legal action against M.I.A. has actually been taken by PSG.

== Track listing ==
- Digital download
1. "Borders" – 4:11
2. "Borders" (Video) – 4:44

== Charts ==
Chart (2015)	Peak position
France (SNEP)	73
US Dance/Electronic Digital Songs (Billboard)	10
US Dance/Electronic Songs (Billboard)	25
US Twitter Top Tracks (Billboard)	24
