= Matangi (album) =

Studio album by M.I.A.
- Released: 1 November 2013
- Studios: Jungle City (New York City) (Note: Engineering on track 4); Chalice (Hollywood) (Note: Track 15; engineering on track 4); The Hit Factory Criteria (Miami) (Note: Track 8)
- Genres: Alternative hip hop; bhangra; electronic; dance; experimental
- Length: 57:16
- Labels: N.E.E.T.; Interscope
- Producers: Danja; Hit-Boy; M.I.A.; Doc McKinney; The Partysquad; Sugu; Surkin; Switch

M.I.A. chronology
| Vicki Leekx (2010) | Matangi (2013) | AIM (2016) |

Singles from Matangi
- 1. "Bad Girls" Released: 31 January 2012; 2. "Bring the Noize" Released: 18 June 2013; 3. "Come Walk with Me" Released: 3 September 2013; 4. "Y.A.L.A." Released: 22 October 2013; 5. "Double Bubble Trouble" Released: 30 May 2014; 6. "Sexodus" Released: 25 May 2015

Matangi is the fourth studio album by English recording artist M.I.A. It was released on 1 November 2013 through N.E.E.T. Recordings and Interscope. M.I.A.'s longtime collaborator Switch primarily handled Matangi's production; Hit-Boy, Doc McKinney, Danja, Surkin, and The Partysquad provided additional contributions. The album was recorded in various locations around the world and featured uncredited input from WikiLeaks founder Julian Assange. Its title is a variant of M.I.A.'s real first name and references the Hindu goddess Matangi. The lyrics feature themes related to Hinduism, including reincarnation and karma, and the music blends Western and Eastern styles.

The album was initially scheduled to be released in December 2012 but it was delayed multiple times; in August 2013, M.I.A. threatened to leak the album herself if the label did not finalise a release date. The lead single, "Bad Girls", was released nearly two years before the album. "Bring the Noize", "Come Walk with Me", and "Y.A.L.A." were also made available as singles prior to Matangi's release and "Double Bubble Trouble" and "Sexodus" were released subsequently.

Matangi received positive reviews from critics and was included in several publications' year-end lists of the best albums of 2013. Its chart peak was lower on the main album chart of both the UK and United States, although in the U.S. it topped the Dance/Electronic Albums chart and reached the top ten of the Top Rap Albums listing. It also charted in other countries, including Australia, Belgium and Japan.

== Background and recording ==
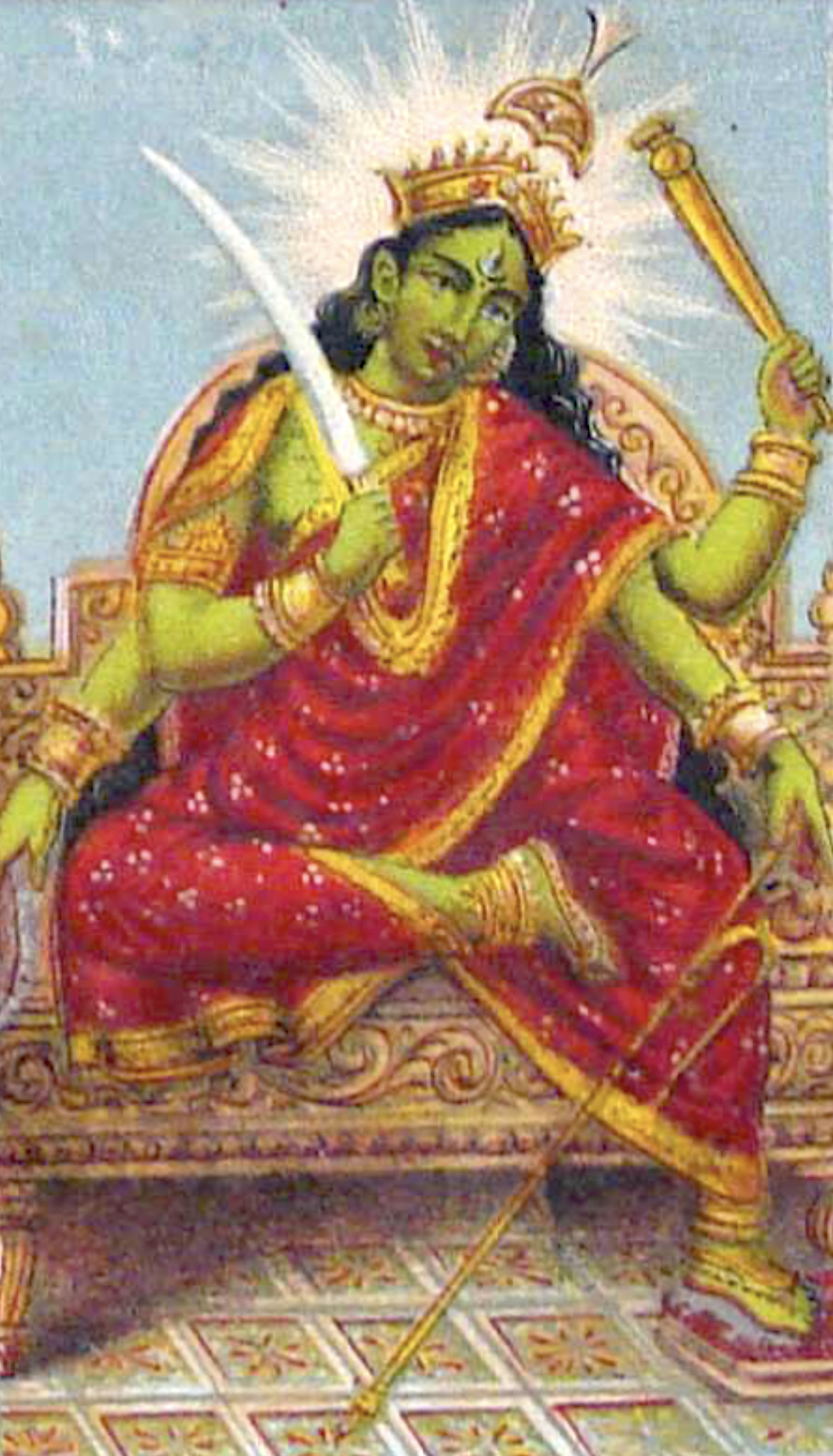
M.I.A. took inspiration from the Hindu goddess Matangi.

M.I.A. released her third album Maya in 2010, which did not garner the wide acclaim of its predecessors Arular (2005) and Kala (2007) and sold poorly compared to Kala. Following the recording of Maya, she wanted to change her creative process before making a new album. She eventually found inspiration in reading about her namesake, the Hindu goddess Matangi, after she searched the word "green" on Google and pictures of the goddess appeared. Inspired by Matangi's life, M.I.A. travelled to temples and universities in India to research ideas for the album, piqued by stories about female spirituality. She decided to steer away from politicised lyrics, a known feature of her previous music.

M.I.A. said that the recording process for Matangi involved input from WikiLeaks founder Julian Assange. She was struggling with writing lyrics that contained the word "tent" for a song, so according to her, Assange "came into the studio and took [her] computer and basically decrypted the whole of the internet, and downloaded every word in the whole of the language that contained the word tent within it". Assange and M.I.A. had been friends for several years, and he made an appearance via Skype at one of her concerts promoting the release of the album.

M.I.A. primarily handled the production for Matangi with longtime collaborator Switch. Hit-Boy, Doc McKinney, Danja, Surkin, and The Partysquad provided additional production work. It was M.I.A.'s first album to not feature producer and songwriter Diplo, with whom she had fallen out. Diplo had accused her of glamorising terrorism through her music and suggested that this had been a factor in the comparative commercial failure of Maya. M.I.A. had also taken issue with his jealous reaction to her signing for a major record label and comments which he had made in a critical article about her published by The New York Times in 2010. The album was recorded in various locations around the world, including London, New York and Los Angeles. The track "Atention" (stylised as "aTENTion") was recorded on the island of Bequia in the Grenadines.

== Music and lyrics ==
M.I.A. "Bad Girls" (2013)
The album blends Eastern and Western musical styles. The opening section of "Bad Girls" combines Middle Eastern instrumentation with a pop/hip-hop chorus.

M.I.A. described the album's sound as like "Paul Simon on acid". In an interview with BBC News, she stated that people expected Matangi to be "spa music" due to its themes of spirituality. However, she said it does not have "a tranquil flute massage sound". The interviewer Mark Savage characterised the album's production as "a chaotic, digitally-degraded thunderstorm of hip-hop and bhangra; punk and pop; spitfire raps and thorny wordplay". Matangi's overall sound mixes Eastern and Western musical styles; Jesse Cataldo of Slant Magazine wrote of the album's combination of desi instrumentation with "a tough new style of dynamic, intensely experimental hip-hop". The R&B-influenced single "Bad Girls" combines Middle Eastern and hip-hop elements with a pop chorus. Spin writer David Marchese described the track as having a "vaguely sinister rhythm slither". Lyrically, the track conveys a message of female empowerment. Clare Lobenfeld of Stereogum ranked it the best song on M.I.A.'s first four albums.

The opening track "Karmageddon" begins with the om chant, and its lyrics reference karma and the dance of Shiva associated with the Hindu creation myth. "Karmageddon" and the second track "Matangi" lyrically suggest that the album will contain attacks on M.I.A.'s critics, and the title track also addresses potential imitators with the line "if you’re gonna be me, need a manifesto". Another song that incorporates Hindu themes is "Y.A.L.A.", which discusses reincarnation. Its title stands for "You Always Live Again", interpreted by some critics as a response to "Y.O.L.O." ("You Only Live Once"), a slogan popularised by rapper Drake, whose name is referenced in the album's title track. "Boom Skit" references M.I.A.'s controversial appearance at the Super Bowl XLVI halftime show, where she extended her middle finger to the camera while performing with Madonna and Nicki Minaj, and suggests that she feels that America rejects her because of her ethnicity. "Come Walk With Me" references the invasive influence of modern technology, continuing a theme from her previous album. NME's Tom Howard observed that Matangi noticeably "winds down" over the course of the three tracks which close the album: the dancehall-influenced "Lights", "Know It Ain't Right" and "Sexodus". Prior to the album's release, M.I.A. said that her favourite lyric was "The truth is like a rotten tooth, you gotta spit it out" from the track "Bring the Noize". NME's Lucy Jones praised the line, but Marc Hogan of Spin described it as a "lyrical clunker".

Many songs in Matangi sample or share similarities with other songs. The short track "Double Bubble Trouble" is sonically and lyrically reminiscent of "Trouble" (1994), a single by female duo Shampoo. "Bring the Noize" uses a beat from the song "Marble Anthem" (2011) by Marble Players, a group which includes Surkin, who produced several tracks on Matangi, although the sample is not listed in the credits. Lobenfeld stated that "Atention" contains an uncredited sample of "Never Scared" (2003) by rapper Bone Crusher featuring T.I. and Killer Mike. "Only 1 U" uses excerpts of the song "Karuppu Thaan Yenakku Pudichu Coloru" from the 2000 Indian film Vetri Kodi Kattu, and "Exodus" and "Sexodus" contain elements of "Lonely Star" (2011) by the Weeknd, who receives a featured artist credit.

== Release and artwork ==
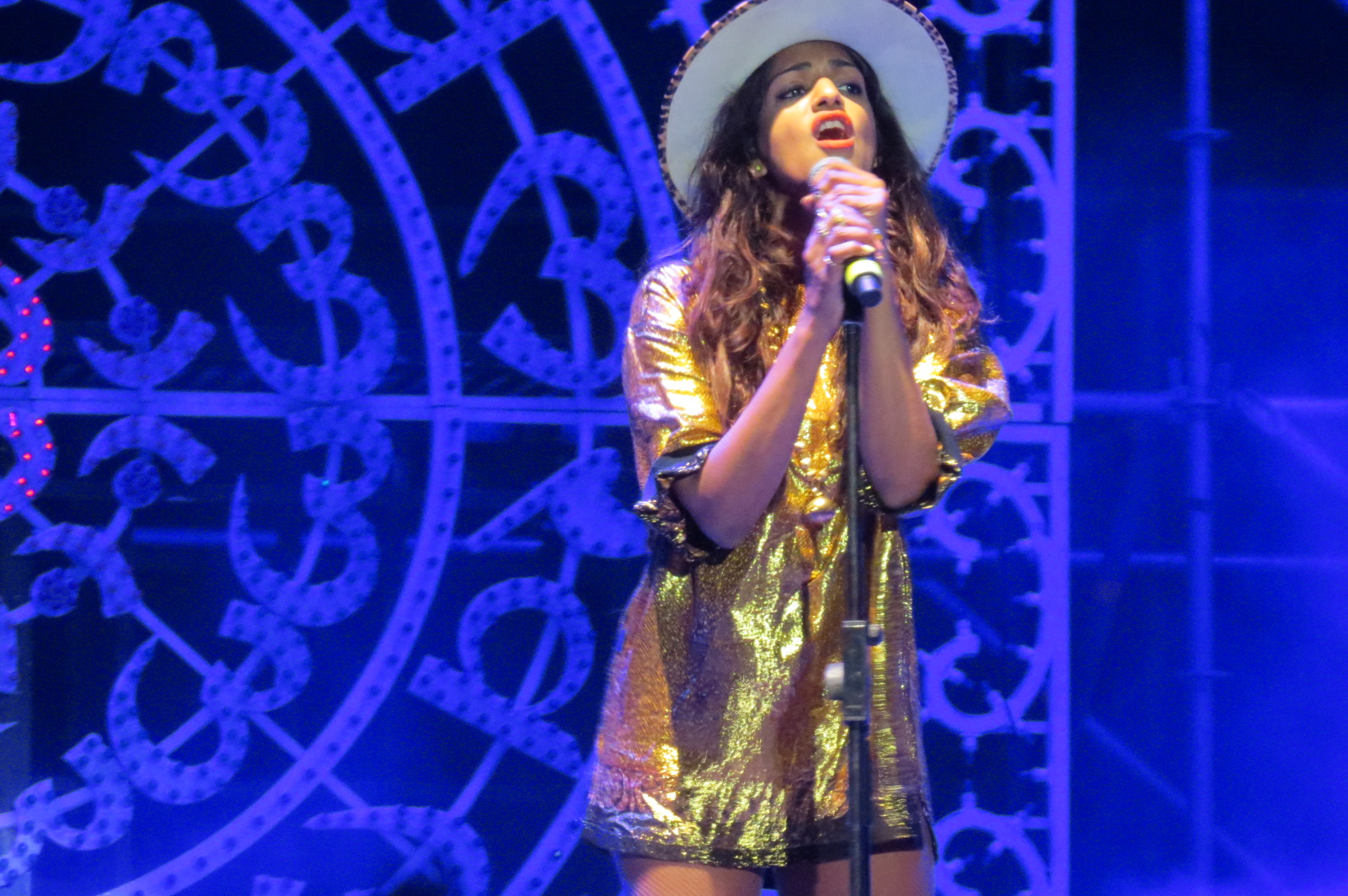
M.I.A. performing live in 2013

M.I.A. teased Matangi by posting a photo of herself in the studio in November 2011, on TwitPic. In August 2012, she posted an image of the album's proposed track listing online, with some of the titles partially obscured. The titles include "Tentple", "Rain" and "Balcony in B—", none of which appear on the final album's track listing.

M.I.A. announced the title of the album in November 2012, explaining that it related to both the Hindu goddess and her own forename, Mathangi. It was originally scheduled for a December 2012 release, but Interscope Records, the parent company of M.I.A.'s label N.E.E.T. Recordings, postponed it. M.I.A. told the press that she had believed that she had finished the album but that the label had rejected it, saying that it was "too positive". The following month she claimed the album would be released in April to coincide with the Tamil New Year, but this did not occur. In August 2013, M.I.A. threatened to leak the album if Interscope took any longer to negotiate a release date. The label responded by announcing the album's official release date as 5 November. Four days before this date, the album was streamed on YouTube and made available to purchase in some countries.

Matangi's cover artwork was revealed in September and depicts M.I.A.'s face tinted red and green. Stereogum writer Tom Breihan described it as continuing a trend where her albums use an "'ugly computer graphics' visual theme". Upon the release of her album Kala (2007), Breihan wrote in The Village Voice that he hoped for her to someday make an album cover that was not garish.

== Promotion ==
Six singles were released from the album, beginning with a new recording of the track "Bad Girls", which had previously appeared on M.I.A.'s 2010 mixtape Vicki Leekx. The track was released as Matangi's lead single on 31 January 2012, accompanied by a music video directed by Romain Gavras, which attracted attention for its apparent focus on laws preventing women in Saudi Arabia from driving. On 3 March 2013, M.I.A. released an eight-minute mix of songs from the album as part of Kenzo's autumn/winter 2013 collection at its Paris Fashion Week show. "Bring the Noize" was released as the second single on 18 June 2013, followed by "Come Walk with Me" on 3 September, and "Y.A.L.A." on 22 October. An animated lyric video was released for "Come Walk With Me", depicting various Hindu deities. "Double Bubble Trouble" was released as the album's fifth single on 30 May 2014, and "Sexodus" as the sixth on 25 May 2015.

M.I.A. promoted the album with a short series of live performances in the United States, including two shows at the Terminal 5 venue in New York, at which she performed tracks from the album and material from her back catalogue backed by DJ Venus X. She also made an appearance at the Fun Fun Fun Fest in Austin, Texas, and performed at the Belasco Theater in Los Angeles. She also appeared on several television shows, including the NBC chat show Late Night with Jimmy Fallon, where she was interviewed and performed "Come Walk with Me". She performed "Y.A.L.A." on both The Colbert Report, and Late Night with Conan O'Brien.

== Critical reception ==
Professional ratings
Aggregate scores
| Source | Rating |
|---|---|
| Metacritic | 78/100 |
Review scores
| Source | Rating |
| AllMusic | 3/5 stars |
| Entertainment Weekly | B+ |
| The Guardian | 4/5 stars |
| The Independent | 5/5 stars |
| The Irish Times | 4/5 stars |
| NME | 8/10 |
| Pitchfork | 6.5/10 |
| Rolling Stone | 3.5/5 stars |
| Spin | 8/10 |
| The Times | 4/5 stars |

Matangi received largely positive reviews from critics. At Metacritic, which assigns a normalised rating out of 100 to reviews from mainstream publications, the album received an average score of 78, categorised as "[g]enerally favorable reviews".

Jon Blistein of Rolling Stone and Chris Bosman of Consequence of Sound called the album one of M.I.A.'s strongest. Jem Aswad of Spin wrote that some of its songs were highlights of M.I.A.'s career and concluded that Matangi was a significant improvement from her previous album. Gavin Haynes of NME and Alexis Petridis of The Guardian praised the album for its nonconformity to the characteristics of mainstream music, and Petridis argued that M.I.A.'s music still did not sound like anyone else's. Other critics were positive about M.I.A.'s continued ability to combine distinct genres within one body of work.

Some reviewers were more critical of the album. The A.V. Club's Marah Eakin and Pitchfork's Lindsay Zoladz were both of the opinion that it had suffered due to the long delays to its release and that a number of the tracks sounded stale and utilised outdated reference points. Zoladz described the title track as a "re-tread" of M.I.A.'s earlier song "Bird Flu" and "Sexodus" as "cardboard-stiff", although she did praise "Bad Girls", which in her view far outshone the other tracks on a largely disappointing album.

Matangi was named among the best albums of 2013 by several publications. NME named Matangi the 12th best album of 2013 in its year-end poll. and the following year ranked the album number 47 in a list of "101 Albums To Hear Before You Die". Pitchfork ranked the album at number 46 on their "The 50 Best Albums of 2013" list. Time ranked the album at number 10 in their annual list. Complex listed it at number 32. For The Barnes & Noble Review, Robert Christgau ranked Matangi 33rd on his year-end best albums list. In 2019, NME placed the album at number 92 on their list of the best albums of the 2010s decade.

== Commercial performance ==
Matangi entered the UK Albums Chart at number 64, significantly lower than M.I.A.'s previous album Maya, which debuted at number 21 in 2010. The following week, the album dropped out of the top 100. In the United States, the album debuted at number 23 on the Billboard 200 chart with first-week sales of 15,000 copies, but that remained its peak position, 14 places lower than that achieved by Maya. In its second week it fell to number 90. The album reached number one on the US Dance/Electronic Albums chart, M.I.A.'s third consecutive album to do so. As of August 2016, Matangi had sold 77,000 copies in the US, compared to the 99,000 which Maya had sold three years after its release. Elsewhere, Matangi reached number 47 in Belgium, number 61 in Switzerland, number 93 in Japan, number 96 in France and number 99 in Australia. In 2016, M.I.A. claimed that the album's performance was impacted by a lack of support from her record label following the Super Bowl incident and other controversies.

== Track listing ==
| No. | Title | Writer(s) | Producer(s) | Length |
|---|---|---|---|---|
| 1. | "Karmageddon" | Maya Arulpragasam; Sugu Arulpragasam; Martin McKinney; Dave Taylor | Sugu; Doc McKinney; Switch^{[a]} | 1:34 |
| 2. | "Matangi" | M. Arulpragasam; Taylor | Switch | 5:12 |
| 3. | "Only 1 U" | M. Arulpragasam; Taylor; Kyle "Micky Park" Edwards | Switch; M.I.A.; So Japan^{[b]}; Surkin^{[b]} | 3:13 |
| 4. | "Warriors" | M. Arulpragasam; Chauncey Hollis | Hit-Boy | 3:41 |
| 5. | "Come Walk with Me" | M. Arulpragasam; Taylor | Switch | 4:44 |
| 6. | "Atention" | M. Arulpragasam; Taylor | Switch | 3:41 |
| 7. | "Exodus" (featuring the Weeknd) | M. Arulpragasam; Taylor; Abel Tesfaye; Carlo Montagnese; McKinney | Switch | 5:08 |
| 8. | "Bad Girls" | M. Arulpragasam; Nate Hills; Marcella Araica | Danja | 3:49 |
| 9. | "Boom Skit" | M. Arulpragasam; Hollis; Rashad Muhammad | Hit-Boy; Haze Banga^{[c]} | 1:16 |
| 10. | "Double Bubble Trouble" | M. Arulpragasam; Ruben Fernhout; Jerry Leembruggen; Rypke Westra | The Partysquad | 3:00 |
| 11. | "Y.A.L.A." | M. Arulpragasam; Fernhout; Leembruggen; Jasper Brightman | The Partysquad | 4:23 |
| 12. | "Bring the Noize" | M. Arulpragasam; Benoit Heitz; Taylor; Jean-Baptiste de Laubier; Hugues Rey | Switch; Surkin | 4:36 |
| 13. | "Lights" | M. Arulpragasam; S. Arulpragasam; Rosalee Pfeffer | Sugu; Switch | 4:36 |
| 14. | "Know It Ain't Right" | M. Arulpragasam; McKinney | McKinney | 3:42 |
| 15. | "Sexodus" (featuring the Weeknd) | M. Arulpragasam; McKinney; Tesfaye; Montagnese | Hit-Boy; Haze Banga^{[c]} | 4:52 |
| Total length: | | | | 57:16 |

Spotify and Amazon MP3 exclusive bonus track
| No. | Title | Writer(s) | Producer(s) | Length |
|---|---|---|---|---|
| 16. | "Like This" | M. Arulpragasam; Hollis; Muhhamad | Hit-Boy; Haze Banga | 2:51 |

Spotify exclusive bonus track
| No. | Title | Writer(s) | Producer(s) | Length |
|---|---|---|---|---|
| 16. | "Trouble Again" | M. Arulpragasam; McKinney; Schlachthofbronx; Fernhout; Leembruggen | McKinney; Schlachthofbronx; The Partysquad | 4:43 |

=== Sample credits ===
- "Only 1 U" contains excerpts of "Karuppu Thaan Yenakku Pudichu Coloru" from the motion picture Vetri Kodi Kattu.
- "Exodus" and "Sexodus" contain elements of "Lonely Star" written by Abel Tesfaye, Carlo Montagnese and Martin McKinney.

=== Notes ===
- ^{^[a]} signifies a vocal producer
- ^{^[b]} signifies an additional producer
- ^{^[c]} signifies a co-producer
- "Atention" is stylised as "aTENTion".

== Personnel ==
Credits adapted from the liner notes of Matangi.

=== Musicians ===
- M.I.A. – vocals
- Neil Comber – guitar (track 5)
- Sugu – additional programming (track 8)

=== Technical ===
- Sugu – production (tracks 1, 13)
- Doc McKinney – production (tracks 1, 14); vocal recording (track 10); recording (track 14)
- Switch – vocal production (track 1); production, mixing (tracks 2, 3, 5–7, 12, 13)
- Neil Comber – mixing (tracks 1, 2, 5); engineering (tracks 1–3, 5–7, 12, 13)
- M.I.A. – mixing (tracks 1, 4, 6, 7); production (track 3)
- Geoff Pesche – mastering (tracks 1–3, 5, 7–15)
- So Japan – additional production (track 3)
- Surkin – additional production, mixing (track 3); production (track 12)
- Hit-Boy – production (tracks 4, 9, 15); mixing (track 4)
- Haze Banga – engineering (tracks 4, 15); co-production, mixing (tracks 9, 15)
- Mazen Murad – mastering (tracks 4, 6)
- Danja – production (track 8)
- Marcella Araica – mixing, engineering (track 8)
- Thomas Culliso – engineering assistance (track 8)
- The Partysquad – production, mixing (tracks 10, 11)
- Schlachthofbronx – vocal recording (track 10)
- Ralf Flores – recording (track 14)
- Jean-Marie Horvat – mixing, engineering (track 14)

=== Artwork ===
- Maya Arulpragasam – creative direction, art direction
- Tom Manaton – creative direction, art direction
- Daniel Sannwald – photography

== Charts ==
=== Weekly charts ===
| Chart (2013) | Peak position |
|---|---|
| Australian Albums (ARIA) | 99 |
| Australian Urban Albums (ARIA) | 12 |
| Belgian Albums (Ultratop Flanders) | 47 |
| Belgian Albums (Ultratop Wallonia) | 62 |
| French Albums (SNEP) | 96 |
| Greek Albums (IFPI) | 60 |
| Japanese Albums (Oricon) | 93 |
| Swiss Albums (Schweizer Hitparade) | 61 |
| UK Albums (Official Charts) | 64 |
| UK R&B Albums (Official Charts) | 4 |
| US Billboard 200 | 23 |
| US Top Dance Albums (Billboard) | 1 |
| US Top Rap Albums (Billboard) | 4 |

=== Year-end charts ===
| Chart (2014) | Position |
|---|---|
| US Top Dance/Electronic Albums (Billboard) | 14 |

== Release history ==
| Region | Date | Format | Label | Ref(s) |
|---|---|---|---|---|
| Ireland | 1 November 2013 | CD | Virgin EMI | |
| Netherlands | 1 November 2013 | CD | Universal | |
| Australia | 4 November 2013 | CD; digital download | Universal | |
| France | 4 November 2013 | CD; digital download | Universal | |
| Germany | 4 November 2013 | CD; digital download | Universal | |
| Italy | 4 November 2013 | Digital download | Universal | |
| Netherlands | 4 November 2013 | Digital download | Universal | |
| United Kingdom | 4 November 2013 | CD; digital download | Virgin EMI | |
| Italy | 5 November 2013 | CD | Universal | |
| Poland | 5 November 2013 | CD | Universal | |
| United States | 5 November 2013 | CD; digital download | N.E.E.T.; Interscope | |
| Japan | 6 November 2013 | Digital download | Universal | |
| Japan | 20 November 2013 | CD | Universal | |
| Germany | 25 November 2013 | LP | Universal | |
| United States | 25 November 2013 | LP | N.E.E.T.; Interscope | |
