= Villains (electronic music group) =

American musical duo

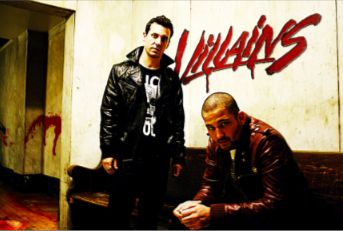

Background information
- Origin: Los Angeles, California, USA
- Genres: Electronica, electronic rock, breakbeat
- Years active: 2007–present
- Label: Dim Mak Records
- Members: Mad V and Koncept
- Website: Villains Official Website

Villains are an American electronic duo consisting of Mad V and Koncept. The group officially formed in late 2007. Within a few months, they were performing all over the United States and getting commissioned to produce official remixes. And now, within just two years, they are touring the globe and producing original music as well as remixes for a wide variety of artists.

== Discography ==
=== Official Remixes ===
- Fischerspooner – "Infidels of the World Unite (Villains Remix)" [via Dim Mak] (2011)
- The Bravery – "Slow Poison (Villains Remix)" [via Mercury / IDJ] (2009)
- Shakira – "She Wolf (Villains Remix)" [via Epic / Sony] (2009)
- Britney Spears – "Circus (Villains Remix)" [via Jive / Zomba] (2009)
- Dragonette – "Fixin' To Thrill (Villains Remix)" [via One Love] (2009)
- Bloc Party – "Ares (Villains Remix)" [via Wichita] (2009)
- Lykke Li – "Little Bit (Villains Remix)" [via Atlantic] (2009)
- N.A.S.A. – "Whatchadoin' (Villains Remix)" feat. M.I.A., Santigold, and Spankrock [via Anti-] (2009)
- DJ Felli Fel – "Get Buck In Here (Villains Remix)" feat. Diddy, Ludacris, Akon, and Lil Jon [via So So Def] (2008)
- Edison Gem – "Things Change (Villains Remix)" [via Orion Music] (2008)
- Bianca G. & The Nasty Boys – "3some (Villains Remix)" [via 3 Is The Co] (2008)
- Shwayze – "Buzzin' (Villains Remix)" [via Suretone / Geffen] (2008)
- Datarock – "Computer Camp Love (Villains Remix)" [via Nettwerk] (2008)

=== Bootleg Remixes ===
- New Young Pony Club – "The Bomb (Villains Xplosive Remix)" (2008)
- Hot Chip – "Ready For The Floor (Villains & L.A. Riots Remix)" (2008)
- Daft Punk – "Around The World (Villains' More Cowbell Edit)" (2007)
- Bloc Party – "Hunting For Witches (Villains Electro-Banger Remix)" (2007)

=== Singles / EPs ===
- "Victims" [via Dim Mak] (2010)
- "I'm On It" Remix EP (with remixes by Acid Girls and AC Slater) [via Villains Records] (2009)
- Villains x Classixx – "I'm On It" feat. o8o [via Coco Machete / Buzzard Gulch] (2009)
- Birth EP [via Villains Records] (2009)

=== Mixtapes ===
- AU / NZ Tour: May 2009: Mini-Mix (2009)
- Villains, Second Offense feat. Whiskey Pete and o8o (2009)
- Maximum Mini-Mega Mix for Indie 103.1 (2008)
- Villains, Volume One feat. Whiskey Pete (2007)
