= Sexodus =

Single by M.I.A. featuring the Weeknd

from the album Matangi
- Released: 25 May 2015
- Genre: R&B; pop
- Length: 4:54
- Label: Interscope
- Songwriters: Maya Arulpragasam; Dave Taylor; Martin McKinney; Abel Tesfaye; Carlo Montagnese
- Producers: Hit-Boy; Haze Banga; War Syntaire

M.I.A. singles chronology
| "Double Bubble Trouble" (2014) | "Sexodus" (2015) | "Swords" (2015) |

The Weeknd singles chronology
| "Drinks On Us" (2015) | "Sexodus" (2015) | "The Hills" (2015) |

"Sexodus" is a song by English rapper M.I.A. from her fourth studio album, Matangi (2013). It is written by M.I.A. alongside British record producer Switch; Doc McKinney, Illangelo, and the Weeknd are also credited due to a sample of the Weeknd's song "Lonely Star" from his mixtape Thursday. The album version of the song was noted for its "striking" similarities to a different song from the album, "Exodus". However, the single version features War Syntaire and was labelled as being "Re-Loaded With War". Before the track was recorded by M.I.A., she offered the song to Madonna.

The song was originally titled "This Exodus", before the "Thi" was deleted and M.I.A. kept the typo. M.I.A. performed the song live during her 2013–14 Matangi Tour.

== Track listing ==
Digital download

1. "M.I.A.'s Sexodus Re-Loaded With War" (featuring War Syntaire) – 4:54

== Personnel ==
Credits adapted from the liner notes of Matangi.

- M.I.A. – vocals
- Hit-Boy – production
- War Syntaire – production, guitar
- Haze Banga – engineering; co-production; mixing
- Geoff Pesche – mastering

== Release history ==
| Region | Date | Format | Label | Ref. |
|---|---|---|---|---|
| Various | 25 May 2015 | Digital download; streaming | Interscope | |
