= The Divine EP =

EP by Blaqstarr
- Released: January 25, 2011
- Genre: Electronic
- Label: Interscope Records

Blaqstarr chronology
Hollertronix #8 (2008)	The Divine EP (2011)	Here We Are (2012)

The Divine EP is an EP by producer and electronic musician Blaqstarr, released on January 25, 2011. Prior to the EP's release, Blaqstarr said that "There are no bounds for my music, so expect to experience every one of your best feelings when you listen to it." The EP's title derives from Blaqstarr's hope that "the release will kickstart his own divine mission."

== Reviews ==
Professional ratings
Review scores
Source	Rating
Pitchfork Media	6.8 stars on a 10 point scale
Robert Christgau	(A)
Rolling Stone	2.5/5 stars
Spin	8/10 stars

== Track listing ==
1. All the World
2. Rider Girl
3. Oh My Darlin'
4. Divine
5. Wonder Woman
6. Turning Out
