= N.E.E.T. Recordings =

- Parent company: Universal Music Group
- Founded: 2008
- Founder: M.I.A.
- Defunct: 2013; 13 years ago
- Status: Inactive
- Distributor: Interscope Records
- Genre: Alternative hip hop, electronica, pop, dance, punk rock, world
- Country of origin: United States

N.E.E.T. Recordings was a vanity record label of Sri Lankan English hip hop recording artist M.I.A. as an imprint of Interscope Records in 2008. N.E.E.T. is an acronym for "Not in Education, Employment or Training".

The first artist signed to the label was Baltimore rapper Rye Rye, while A. R. Rahman's Slumdog Millionaire soundtrack was the label's first official release. Seeking to expose new, underground music, M.I.A. signed Baltimore musician Blaqstarr, indie rock band Sleigh Bells and visual artist Jaime Martinez in 2009.

== Artists ==
- M.I.A. (founder)
- Rye Rye
- Blaqstarr
- Sleigh Bells
- Jaime Martinez

== Discography ==
- M.I.A. - Matangi (2013)
- Blaqstarr - Here We Are (2013)
- Rye Rye - Go! Pop! Bang! (2012)
- Blaqstarr - The Divine EP (2011)
- M.I.A. - Maya (2010)
- M.I.A. - XXXO/XXXO The Remixes/XXXO The Remixes: Part 2 (2010)
- Sleigh Bells - Treats (2010)
- Rye Rye - Never Will Be Mine - The Remixes (2011)
- Rye Rye - Sunshine - The Remixes (2011)
- Rye Rye - "Bang"/Bang - The Remixes (2009)
- A. R. Rahman - Slumdog Millionaire (2008)

== See also ==
- List of record labels
- List of electronic music record labels
- List of hip hop record labels
