= Rye Rye =

American rapper

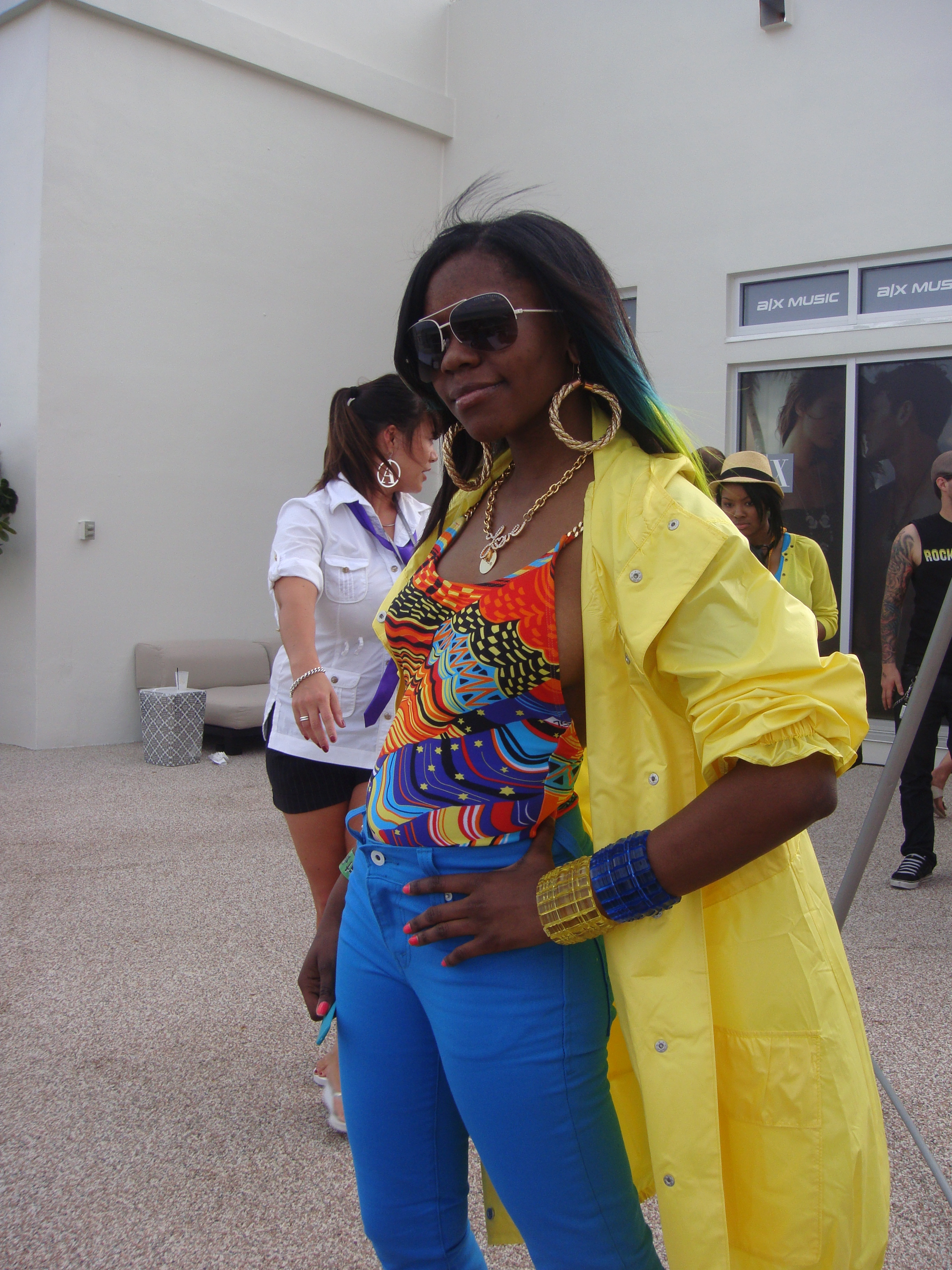
- Rye Rye at WMC 2009 in Miami, Florida

Background information
- Also known as: Rye Rye
- Born: Ryeisha Rochelle Berrain; November 25, 1990 (age 35); Baltimore, Maryland, U.S.
- Genres: Hip hop; dance; Baltimore club
- Occupations: Rapper; singer; dancer; actress
- Years active: 2006–present
- Labels: N.E.E.T.; Interscope
- Website: Rye Rye Myspace; Rye Rye official website

Ryeisha Rochelle Berrain (born November 25, 1990), known by her stage name Rye Rye, is an American rapper, singer, dancer and actress. Signed to N.E.E.T. Recordings, she released her first mixtape RYEot PowRR in 2011 and her anticipated debut album Go! Pop! Bang! on May 15, 2012. In early 2009, MSNBC listed Rye Rye as one of the "5Top: Top of the pops! Up-and coming young singers." In 2011, Rye Rye was named one of Billboard's "21 Under 21". Rye Rye made her acting debut in the 2012 film 21 Jump Street.

== Career ==
=== Early career ===
Rye Rye began performing at the age of 16. She wanted to join the music industry because she felt there was potential there, adding "I love performing, singing, dancing, all of that and I felt that given the opportunity I would destroy it."

She met the musician Blaqstarr, a friend of her sister's, and worked with him on her early material after leaving a rap verse on his answering machine. On this process she notes "I used to like to write poetry and stories. One day I was home, bored, and started to compose songs."

Her song "Shake It To The Ground," produced in collaboration with Blaqstarr, was a club hit in 2006, leading to local speculation that Rye Rye could be a fresh, new female success within hip hop music. A meeting between Rye Rye, M.I.A. and Diplo in a studio in 2006/2007 was arranged by Blaqstarr after the song caught M.I.A.'s attention. Blaqstarr told Rye Rye somebody wanted to meet her, but refused to say more. Although upon meeting them Rye Rye did not know who they were, M.I.A. told the rapper that she had been looking for her. At the time, Rye Rye was in her junior year at Dr. Samuel L. Banks High School. She toured with M.I.A. during the KALA Tour in fall and winter of 2007, which included opening for her during the CMJ Music Marathon and dates in the United Kingdom in 2007, the People Vs. Money Tour in early 2008 and briefly with Afrikan Boy. They both appeared in M.I.A.'s 2007 music video for the song "Paper Planes."

=== Go! Pop! Bang! ===
Rye Rye was the first artist signed to M.I.A.'s record label N.E.E.T., imprint of Interscope Records. Her debut album, titled Go! Pop! Bang! was set to come out in March 2009, but its release was delayed. In the interim, she recorded guest verses for other songs. She performed the song "What I Got" with Blaqstarr and M.I.A. in live performances; other recordings completed but not confirmed for her album included "Gangsta Girl" with Zakee, "Bang" with M.I.A., "Wassup Wassup" with DJ Diplo, "Hardcore Girls" with The Count & Sinden and "Reasons" as well as "Older Man", a song about falling in love with someone twice your age, and "Quit Swinging." A music video for "Shake It To The Ground" was made. Rye Rye appears on M.I.A.'s remix of Busy Signal's "Tic Toc" and she performed in Sweden in summer of 2008, featuring on the rapclash remix of Adrian Lux's single "Strawberry". She features on a remix of M.I.A.'s "Paper Planes" with Afrikan Boy, which she performed during her 2007 live dates on the Kala Tour and appears on the Paper Planes - Homeland Security Remixes EP. In an interview with Nylon during the making of "Bang", M.I.A. described Rye Rye as "the voice of Baltimore". Rye Rye also worked with The Neptunes while recording her debut. In October 2008, she performed the song "Paper Planes" with Pharrell Williams and a pregnant M.I.A. at the Diesel XXX party at Pier 3 in Brooklyn.

Rye Rye is featured on the Crookers debut album, Tons of Friends, rapping on the track, "Hip Hop Changed". Rye Rye also appears on a track by Tel-aviv based Soulico called "Exotic On The Speaker". Rye Rye is featured on the track "Have You Heard?" by Ceci Bastida. She song "X Girl" for the electro-duo Teenage Bad Girl's second album "Backwash". Rye Rye's single "Bang" (featuring M.I.A.) appeared on the Fast & Furious motion picture soundtrack, and she released her M.I.A.-directed video for the track in 2009. Rolling Stone called the track "gloriously showoffy". Rye Rye's performance at SXSW in 2010 was well received by critics and festival goers. She performed at the Winter Music Conference in Miami before opening for indie rock band The Gossip in April 2010.

On February 9, 2011, Rye Rye put up her pre-album mixtape RYEot PowRR for download, along with a video to her remix of Miley Cyrus' "Party in the U.S.A.". After several date changes, an official release date for Go! Pop! Bang! was announced for February 22, 2011. However, the album did not come out and is presently slated for a Fall 2011 release. Rye Rye performed at the 2010 Alexander Wang fashion week after party. The first single to be lifted from her debut album Go! Pop! Bang! entitled "Sunshine", was released on October 5 and leaked online a day earlier. A music video with M.I.A. was shot in September 2010, and released on October 8. Rye Rye has recently joined M.I.A. to perform on her tour of international shows in 2010.

On June 7, 2011, she released a second single "Never Will Be Mine" featuring Robyn. The video featuring the two artists premiered on June 15, 2011 and after two days, had been viewed 2,740,998 times. The song reached number 12 on the US Billboard Hot Dance Club Songs. Rye Rye also toured with Robyn, as well as Katy Perry and LMFAO on arena shows.

Rye Rye released her single "New Thing" in 2011, which showcases and soundtracks fashion designer Prabal Gurung's collection and the 2011 "Women Go All In" Adidas advert. In April 2012, her single "Boom Boom" reached number 8 on the US Billboard Hot Dance Club Songs.

=== Departure from N.E.E.T. Recordings ===
In a 2016 interview, Rye Rye revealed that she had left N.E.E.T. Recordings, claiming that "N.E.E.T. kinda [sic] just folded. M.I.A. was focusing on her own stuff, [and] never really put that much time into the label", and that she was planning on releasing music independently.

== Acting ==
Rye Rye appeared in the film 21 Jump Street and its sequel 22 Jump Street, she also recorded 21 Jump Street's main theme with Esthero.

== Artistry ==
=== Style and inspiration ===
The LA Times described her music as a "hardcore club sound." Rye Rye collaborated on the album with executive producer, co-writer and stylist M.I.A., whom Rye Rye described as her fashion icon. Rolling Stone described Go! Pop! Bang! as "the hip-hop album most likely to set the club on fire" while Paper stated the album "will take over car stereos one impossibly ear-catching kinetic party jam at a time." Bust described her debut album as "Baltimore grime at its best." She told Rap-Up TV that she was also a fan of clothing designer Jeremy Scott.

Speaking of the ease at which writing her lyrics comes to her, Rye Rye notes that listening to her songs' beats repeatedly in the studio helps her to focus. Rye Rye has spoken of her intention to work with Chris Brown, Lil Wayne, Rihanna and Jay-Z as well as a Disney Channel artist to reach out to child audiences. She says, "Of course I want to work with artists that can dance so in saying that I have to say that Ciara is someone I really want to work with, as that girl have moves. Not forgetting Ms. Missy Elliott of course as I think her videos are crazy."

=== Influence ===
Rye Rye is the muse of fashion designer Prabal Gurung. Music critics have noted similarities between the style of the music video in the song "What You Talking About!?" by Redlight, featuring Ms. Dynamite, with that of M.I.A. and Rye Rye.

== Discography ==
=== Albums ===
- Go! Pop! Bang! (2012)

=== Mixtapes ===
- RYEot PowRR (2011)

=== Singles ===
- "Bang" (featuring M.I.A.) (2009)
- "Sunshine" (featuring M.I.A.) (2010)
- "Never Will Be Mine" (featuring Robyn) (2011)
- "New Thing" (2011)
- "Boom Boom" (2012)
- "21 Jump Street" (featuring Esthero) (2012)
- ”Crazy legs anthem” (2021)
- ”QUEEN’N” (2021)
- I See You (featuring lau.ra) (2022)
- Tip Thru The Door (featuring Cakes da Killa, WERK) (2022)

=== As featured artist ===
- "Shake It To The Ground" (2007) (Blaqstarr featuring Rye Rye)
- "Paper Planes (Blaqstarr remix)"(M.I.A. featuring Rye Rye and Afrikan Boy)
- "Hardcore Girls" (2008) (The Count & Sinden featuring Rye Rye)
- "Wassup Wassup" (2008) (Diplo featuring Rye Rye)
- "Lovely" (2009) (Johnny Spanish featuring Rye Rye)
- "Exotic On The Speaker" (2009) (Soulico featuring Rye Rye)
- "Hip Hop Changed" (2010) (Crookers featuring Rye Rye)
- "Kawaii" (2011) (Missill featuring Rye Rye)
- "X Girl" (2011) (Teenage Bad Girl featuring Rye Rye)
- "Jello" (2011) (Far East Movement featuring Rye Rye)
- "Bad Girls (Switch Remix)" (2012) (M.I.A featuring Missy Elliott & Rye Rye)
- "I Kiki" (2012) (Toddla T vs Scissor Sisters featuring Spank Rock & Rye Rye)
- "Actin' up" (2013) (Asher Roth featuring Rye Rye & Justin Bieber and Chris Brown)
- "Now" (2014) (Bassnectar featuring Rye Rye)
- "Legs" (2015) (Laganja Estranja featuring Rye Rye)
- "TKO" (2016) (Bassnectar featuring Rye Rye & Zion I)
- ”Look - All Night Mix” (2022) (Doss featuring Rye Rye)
