= Blaqstarr =

American rapper

- Also known as: DJ Blaqstarr; Jamal Loving
- Born: Charles Jamal Smith; September 30, 1985 (age 40)
- Origin: Baltimore, Maryland, U.S.
- Genres: Hip hop; Baltimore club; dance
- Occupations: Rapper; record producer; singer; DJ
- Years active: 2000s–present
- Labels: N.E.E.T.; Manta Ray Records; GASS Records
- Website: Official website

Charles Jamal Smith (born September 30, 1985), better known as Blaqstarr or DJ Blaqstarr, is an American rapper, singer, record producer and DJ. He is best known for his work with M.I.A.

== Biography ==
Blaqstarr had local success in the early 2000s with the songs "Get My Gun," "Ryda Girl," "Jiggle It," "Hands Up Thumbs Down" and "Feel It In the Air," released via Starr Productions. In 2005, he contributed songs such as "Tote It" to the album Operation Playtime and the songs "Supastarr" and "So Horney" to the album Baltimore Club 9.

In December 2005, M.I.A. travelled to America to work with Blaqstarr on her second album, telling The Observer, "I arrived at 9 am and he'd been arrested at seven; he was still up from the night before. That's his studio, and it's got a washer-dryer in the back and a sofa bed, that's his whole set-up; that's why he doesn't make it out of Baltimore." "Shake It to The Ground" featured Rye Rye, an affiliate of Blaqstarr's in Baltimore, and became a club hit in 2006. Blaqstarr introduced Rye Rye to M.I.A. after the singer asked for a meeting, leading to touring with the artist and collaborations on her album Kala which led to wide recognition. His EP, Supastarr, was released, its first single being the rereleased "Shake It To the Ground" for which a music video was made, and another EP, titled Shake It To the Ground was also released in 2007.

In January 2008, Blaqstarr released the album King of Roq. He toured with Diplo, M.I.A., and Rye Rye, and participated in the Rock the Bells tour. He also produced and recorded tracks with M.I.A., Mos Def, Switch, and Rye Rye. In June 2008, he contributed a track to the album Hollertronix 8, along with DJ Sega.

In early 2009, Blaqstarr released a single in collaboration with the DJ Diplo titled "Get Off". M.I.A. and Blaqstarr released a song and video "Way Down in the Hole" following his signing to the N.E.E.T. Recordings record label. He also produced some tracks for the 2009 K-Swift album Greatest Hits.

In 2009, Blaqstarr was chosen to perform at the People's Inaugural Ball in Washington D.C., one of the unofficial pre-inaugural events in the days leading up to the inauguration of Barack Obama.

Blaqstarr was on the lineup for the SXSW Festival, which took place in Austin, Texas, from March 13 to 22, 2009. He released an EP entitled "The Divine" on January 25, 2011. It includes six songs: "All The World," "Rider Girl," "Oh My Darlin," "Divine," "Wonder Women" and "Turning Out".

== Critical reception ==
Music critic Chris Richards of The Washington Post, in reviewing the 2008 recording I'm Bangin' 2, wrote, "If Blaqstarr's hallucinogenic odes to sex, drugs, and Baltimore don't make him a legend in his day, they should certainly cement his cult status in some dystopian future." Billboard wrote, regarding King of Roq, "Much of the music sounds like standard hip-hop fare but sped up to Alvin & the Chipmunks speed; it's fast, furious and dirty."

== Discography ==
=== EPs ===
- Supastarr (2007)
- Shake It to the Ground (featuring Rye Rye) (Mad Decent, 2007)
- Hollertronix #8 (2008)
- The Divine EP (2011)
- The Blaq Files (2014)
- Trinity EP, vol 1 (2014)
- Trinity EP, vol 1.5 (2014)
- Moan Her Lease Her (2016)
- M.I.A Aim. (2017)

=== Mixtapes ===
- Blaqstarr The Mixtape (2011)

== Videography ==
- 2007: "Shake It To The Ground"
- 2009: "S.U.S. (Save Ur Souls)/Way Down In The Hole" w/ M.I.A.
- 2010: "Oh My Darlin"
- 2011: "Rider Gyrl"
- 2011: "Never Hesitant"
- 2014: "Dear Diamond" ft Common
