= Alice Merton discography =

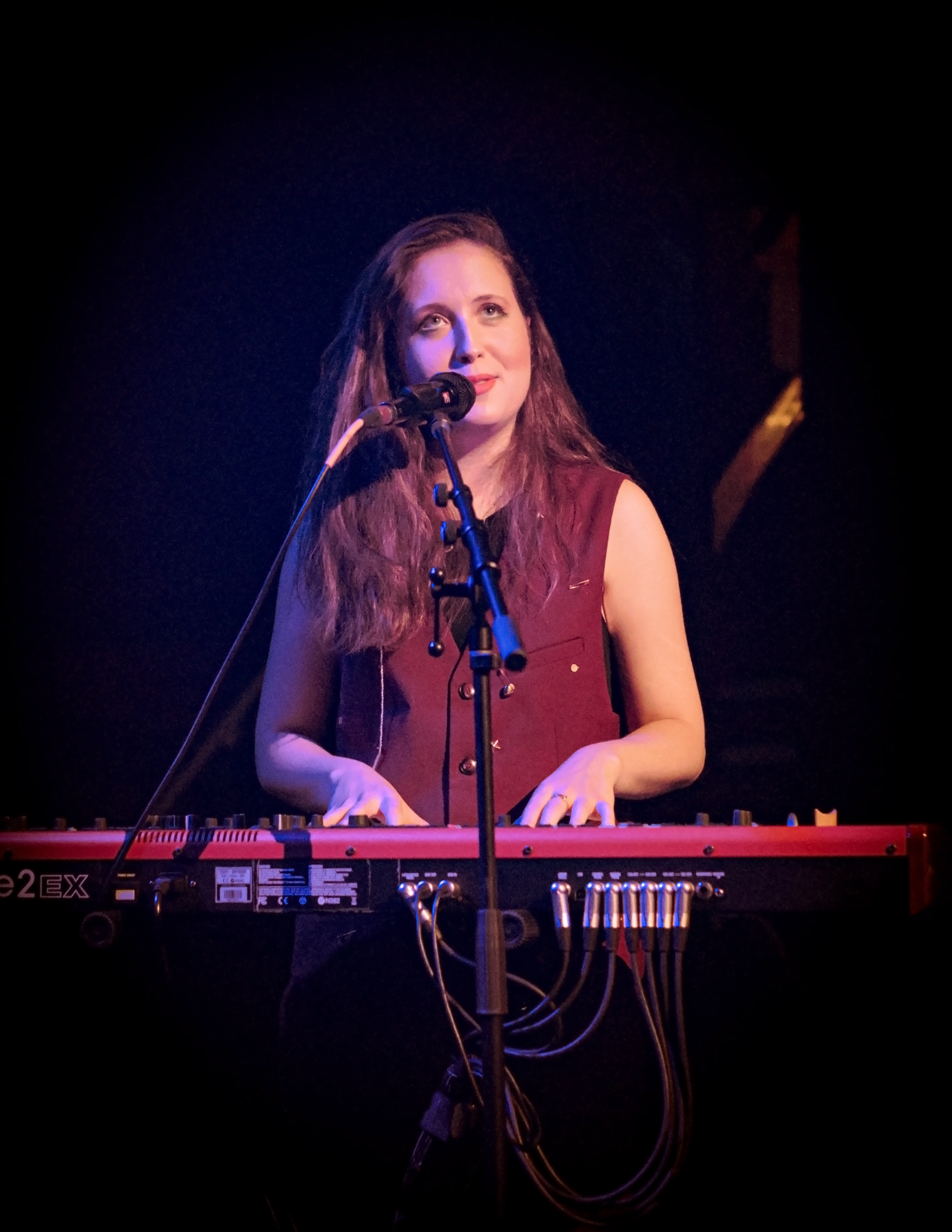
- Merton in 2024
- Studio albums: 3
- EPs: 3
- Singles: 19
- Music videos: 18

British-German-Canadian singer-songwriter Alice Merton has released three studio albums, three extended plays, nineteen singles (including three as a featured artist) and 16 music videos. In 2016, she released her debut single "No Roots", which debuted at number 84 on the US Billboard Hot 100, and an EP of the same name in 2018. It was followed by her debut studio album Mint (2019).

== Studio albums ==
List of studio albums, with selected details and chart positions
Title	Studio album details	Peak chart positions								
Title	Studio album details	GER	AUT	ITA	SCO	SWI	UK	UK Indie	US	US Ind.
Mint	Released: 18 January 2019; Label: Paper Planes, Mom + Pop; Formats: Vinyl, Digital download, streaming	2	19	62	66	21	— (Note: Mint did not enter the UK Albums Chart, but peaked at number 25 on the UK Official Album Downloads Chart.)	14	— (Note: Mint did not enter the US Billboard 200, but peaked at number 48 on the US Top Album Sales Chart.)	13
S.I.D.E.S.	Released: 17 June 2022; Label: Paper Planes, Mom + Pop; Formats: Vinyl, digital download, streaming	28	—	—	—	—	—	—	—	—
Visions	Released: 16 January 2026; Label: Paper Planes; Formats: Vinyl, digital download, streaming	66	—	—	—	—	—	—	—	—

== Extended plays ==
List of extended plays, with selected details and chart positions
Title	Extended play details	Peak chart positions			
Title	Extended play details	US	US Alt.	US Ind.	US Rock
No Roots	Released: 6 April 2018; Label: Paper Plane, Mom + Pop; Formats: CD, digital download	171	14	17	30
Heron	Released: 12 April 2024; Label: Paper Plane; Formats: Vinyl, digital download, streaming	—	—	—	—
Heron II	Released: 16 August 2024; Label: Paper Plane; Formats: Digital download, streaming	—	—	—	—

== Singles ==
=== As lead artist ===
List of singles as lead artist, showing year released, selected chart positions, certifications, and originating album
Title	Year	Peak chart positions										Certifications	Album
Title	Year	GER	AUT	CAN	FRA	ITA	MEX	SWI	UK	US	US Rock	Certifications	Album
"No Roots"	2016	2	3	97	41	7	27	12	52	84	5	BVMI: 3× Gold; BPI: Silver; IFPI AUT: Platinum; IFPI SWI: Platinum; FIMI: 2× Platinum; SNEP: Platinum; RIAA: Gold	Mint
"Hit the Ground Running"	2017	—	—	—	—	—	—	—	—	—	—		No Roots
"Lash Out"	2018	—	—	—	—	66	—	— (Note: "Lash Out" did not enter the Swiss Singles chart, but charted at number 89 on the Swiss Airplay chart.)	—	—	37	FIMI: Gold	Mint
"Why So Serious"	2018	— (Note: "Why So Serious" did not enter the German Singles Chart, but peaked at number 5 on the Deutsche Single Trend Chart.)	60	—	—	—	— (Note: "Why So Serious" did not enter the Mexico Airplay chart, but peaked at number 9 on the Mexico Ingles Airplay chart.)	—	—	—	—		Mint
"Funny Business"	2018	—	—	—	—	—	—	—	—	—	— (Note: "Funny Business" did not enter the Hot Rock & Alternative Songs chart, but peaked at number 42 on the US Rock & Alternative Airplay chart.)		Mint
"Learn to Live"	2019	—	—	—	—	—	—	—	—	—	—		Mint
"Easy"	2019	—	—	—	—	—	—	—	—	—	—		Mint +4
"Vertigo"	2021	—	—	—	—	—	—	—	—	—	— (Note: "Vertigo" did not enter the Hot Rock & Alternative Songs chart, but peaked at number 46 on the US Rock & Alternative Airplay chart.)		S.I.D.E.S.
"Hero"	2021	—	—	—	—	—	—	—	—	—	—		S.I.D.E.S.
"Island"	2021	—	—	—	—	—	—	—	—	—	—		S.I.D.E.S.
"Same Team"	2022	—	—	—	—	—	—	—	—	—	—		S.I.D.E.S.
"Blindside"	2022	—	—	—	—	—	—	—	—	—	—		S.I.D.E.S.
"Loveback"	2022	—	—	—	—	—	—	—	—	—	—		S.I.D.E.S.
"Waste My Life"	2023	—	—	—	—	—	—	—	—	—	—		Non-album singles
"Charlie Brown"	2023	—	—	—	—	—	—	—	—	—	—		Non-album singles
"Run Away Girl"	2024	— (Note: "Run Away Girl" did not enter the German Singles Chart, but peaked at number 100 on the Deutsche Single Download Chart.)	—	—	—	—	—	—	—	—	—		Heron
"Pick Me Up"	2024	—	—	—	—	—	—	—	—	—	—		Heron
"Sleigh Ride"	2024	—	—	—	—	—	—	—	—	—	—		Non-album single
"Ignorance Is Bliss"	2025	—	—	—	—	—	—	—	—	—	—		Visions
"Cruel Intentions"	2025	—	—	—	—	—	—	—	—	—	—		Visions
"Landline"	2025	—	—	—	—	—	—	—	—	—	—		Visions
"—" denotes a recording that did not chart or was not released in that territory.

==== As featured artist ====
List of singles as featured artist, showing year released and originating album
Title	Year	Other artist(s)	Album	Ref.
"Half as Good as You"	2018	Tom Odell	Jubilee Road	
"The Best"	2020	Awolnation	Angel Miners & the Lightning Riders	
"Flower Moon"	2024	MisterWives	Nosebleeds: Encore	

== Music videos ==
List of music videos, showing year released and directors
Title	Year	Director	Ref.
"No Roots"	2017	Stolarow	
"Hit the Ground Running"	2017	Paul Grauwinkel and Max Stolarow	
"Lash Out"	2018	Max Nadolny and Jonas Stark	
"Why So Serious?"	2018	Alice Merton and Paul Grauwinkel	
"Half As Good As You" (Tom Odell featuring Alice Merton)	2018	Sophie Littman	
"Funny Business"	2019	Alice Merton	
"Learn To Live"	2019	Paul Grauwinkel	
"Easy"	2019	Alice Merton	
"Vertigo"	2021	Anuk Rohde	
"Hero"	2021	Anuk Rohde	
"Same Team"	2022	Dominik Galizia	
"Blindside"	2022	Sander Houtkruijer	
"The Other Side"	2022	Ivan Boljat	
"Waste My Life"	2023	Martin Swarovski and Alice Merton	
"Charlie Brown"	2023	Alice Merton	
"Pick Me Up"	2024	Alice Merton	
"Ignorance is Bliss"	2025	Alice Merton	
