= Broken View =

Studio album by Sam Barber
- Released: April 3, 2026
- Genres: Americana; country; folk
- Length: 50:18
- Label: Atlantic
- Producers: Sam Barber; Joe Becker

Sam Barber chronology
Restless Mind (2024)	Broken View (2026)

Singles from Broken View
- 1. "Borrowed Time" Released: March 6, 2026; 2. "Just a Kid" Released: March 27, 2026

Broken View is the second studio album by American singer-songwriter Sam Barber, released on April 3, 2026, through Atlantic Records. Barber produced the album himself alongside Joe Becker, who produced his debut album Restless Mind (2024), and Barber co-wrote all thirteen tracks on the project. Two of the songs also feature co-production from Aaron Dessner. It was preceded by the singles "Borrowed Time", and "Just a Kid". Thematically, Broken View is an introspective reflection on life’s complexities, exploring themes of love, loss and self-discovery.

== Background ==
The lead single from the album, "Borrowed Time", was released on March 6, 2026.

Broken View was officially announced on March 10, 2026.

"Just a Kid" was released on March 27, 2026 as the second single from the album, alongside an accompanying short film directed by Gus Black and starring actress Elle Chapman.

== Track listing ==
All tracks are written by Sam Barber and Joe Becker, except where noted.

Broken View
No.	Title	Writer(s)	Length
1.	"Borrowed Time"		3:49
2.	"Far Past"		3:47
3.	"Just a Kid"		4:18
4.	"Hate It Here"	Avery Anna; Sam Barber	3:30
5.	"Broken View"		3:40
6.	"All For You"	Anna; Barber	4:04
7.	"Satellite"	Barber; Becker; Carrie K	3:14
8.	"The More I Hope"		4:06
9.	"Hopeless Son"		3:50
10.	"Lighthouse"		4:44
11.	"Run"	Barber; Becker; Carrie K	3:58
12.	"I Will Follow"		3:08
13.	"Hope It Never Rains"		3:40
Total length:			50:18

== Personnel ==
Credits are adapted from Tidal.

=== Musicians ===
- Sam Barber – vocals, acoustic guitar (all tracks); electric guitar (tracks 1–6, 8–10, 12, 13), banjo (3, 10), background vocals (10, 11)
- Kevin McGowan – drums (1–5, 7–9, 11), percussion (4, 5, 7–9, 11)
- Phil Anthony – bass guitar (1, 2, 5, 7, 8, 11), upright bass (13)
- Luc Nyhus – electric guitar (1, 2, 5, 7, 8, 11)
- Tyler Bryant – electric guitar (1, 7, 11); acoustic guitar, bass guitar (1)
- Seth Taylor – acoustic guitar (2, 7, 8, 11); banjo, mandolin (7)
- Luisa Marion – fiddle (2, 8), background vocals (2, 11),
- Joe Becker – piano (3–6, 8–10, 12, 13), bass guitar (3, 6, 9, 10, 12), percussion (6, 8), drums (6, 10), keyboards (6), programming (10)
- Aaron Dessner – acoustic guitar, bass guitar, electric guitar (4, 13); drums, percussion, piano, synthesizer (13)
- Avery Anna – background vocals (6)

=== Technical ===
- Sam Barber – production
- Joe Becker – production (1–12), additional production (13), engineering (1, 3–6, 9, 10, 12, 13)
- Aaron Dessner – production (4, 13)
- Ryan Hewitt – mixing
- Dave Huffman – mastering
- Tyler Bryant – engineering (1–3, 5, 7–9, 11)
- Bella Blasko – engineering (4, 13)
- Lake Wilkinson – engineering assistance (2, 3, 7, 8, 11)
- Gillian Pelkonen – engineering assistance (4, 13)

== Charts ==
Chart performance for Broken View
Chart (2026)	Peak position
Canadian Albums (Billboard)	47
Hungarian Physical Albums (MAHASZ)	33
New Zealand Albums (RMNZ)	38
UK Americana Albums (Official Charts)	4
US Billboard 200	60
US Top Country Albums (Billboard)	12
