= No Roots =

No Roots may refer to:

- "No Roots" (album), a 2004 album by British electronica band Faithless or its title track
- "No Roots" (song), a 2016 song by German singer-songwriter Alice Merton
- No Roots (EP), a 2017 EP by the same artist
