= Lash Out =

Single by Alice Merton

from the album Mint
- Released: 30 May 2018
- Length: 3:14
- Label: Paper Plane; Mom + Pop
- Songwriter(s): Alice Merton; Dave Bassett
- Producer(s): Dave Bassett; Nicolas Rebscher

Alice Merton singles chronology
"Hit the Ground Running" (2017)	"Lash Out" (2018)	"Why So Serious" (2018)

Music video
- "Lash Out" on YouTube

"Lash Out" is a song by German-Canadian-English singer Alice Merton. It was released on 30 May 2018, as the second single from her debut studio album, Mint (2019).

== Production ==
Merton co-wrote the song with songwriter Dave Bassett. The song was released through Paper Plane Records and Mom + Pop Music on 30 May 2018 with a music video. The song includes a guitar-heavy track similar to Merton's other singles "No Roots" and "Hit the Ground Running". The single was included in the American re-release of Merton's EP No Roots. The music video was co-directed by Max Nadolny and Jonas Stark, with shots recorded in Berlin and South Africa.

== Charts ==
=== Weekly charts ===
Chart (2018)	Peak position
Canada Rock (Billboard)	22
Croatia (HRT)	65
Czech Republic Modern Rock (IFPI)	8
Italy (FIMI)	66
Switzerland Airplay (Schweizer Hitparade)	89
US Hot Rock & Alternative Songs (Billboard)	37
US Rock & Alternative Airplay (Billboard)	22

=== Year-end charts ===
Chart (2018)	Position
Iceland (Plötutíóindi)	97

== Certifications ==
Region	Certification	Certified units/sales
Italy (FIMI)	Gold	25,000^{‡}
^{‡} Sales+streaming figures based on certification alone.
