= Carrier Pigeon (album) =

Studio album by Odie Leigh
- Released: July 12, 2024
- Genre: Indie pop
- Length: 33:43
- Label: Mom + Pop
- Producers: Odie Leigh; Derek Ted (Note: Runnner (real name Noah Weinman) is additionally credited for production on "No Doubt".)

Odie Leigh chronology
The Only Thing Worse Than a Woman Who Lies Is a Girl Who'll Tell Truths (2023)	Carrier Pigeon (2024)

Singles from Carrier Pigeon
- 1. "No Doubt" Released: January 25, 2024; 2. "Either Way" Released: March 21, 2024; 3. "Conversation Starter" Released: May 3, 2024; 4. "My Name on a T-Shirt" Released: June 6, 2024; 5. "Already (On My Mind)" Released: July 10, 2024

Carrier Pigeon is the debut studio album by American singer-songwriter Odie Leigh. It was released on July 12, 2024, through Mom + Pop Music. Produced by Leigh with Derek Ted, the album has been noted as an evolution from Leigh's earlier, sparser folk style, with fuller instrumentation and a sound which Leigh describes as "going from acoustic to this kind of late '90s, early 2000s girl-rock thing."

"No Doubt", "Either Way", "Conversation Starter", "My Name on a T-Shirt", and "Already (On My Mind)" have been released as singles to promote the album.

== Critical reception ==
Writing for Paste, Leah Weinstein gave the album a rating of 7.4 out of 10, while praising both Leigh's songwriting and the album's pacing.

== Track listing ==
All tracks are written by Lauren Hicks.

Carrier Pigeon
No.	Title	Length
1.	"A Good Thing"	3:29
2.	"Already (On My Mind)"	2:52
3.	"Party Trick"	3:13
4.	"Conversation Starter"	2:49
5.	"No Doubt"	3:46
6.	"Finer Things"	3:00
7.	"Either Way"	4:12
8.	"Common Denominator"	3:39
9.	"Idiom"	2:40
10.	"My Name on a T-Shirt"	4:03
Total length:		33:43
