= Drastic Measures (disambiguation) =

Drastic Measures is a 1983 album by the rock band Kansas.

Drastic Measures may also refer to:

- Drastic Measures (Bayonne album) (2019)
- Drastic Measures (Dalbello album) (1981)
