= Restless Mind =

Studio album by Sam Barber
- Released: November 1, 2024
- Length: 93:56
- Labels: Lockeland Springs; Atlantic
- Producer: Joe Becker

Sam Barber chronology
Live EP 001 (2024)	Restless Mind (2024)	Music for the Soul (2025)

Singles from Restless Mind
- 1. "S.O.B." Released: February 9, 2024; 2. "Streetlight" Released: March 14, 2024; 3. "Better Year" / "Jersey Giant" Released: August 23, 2024; 4. "Thought of You" Released: October 11, 2024; 5. "Indigo" / "Restless Mind" Released: October 31, 2024

Restless Mind is the debut studio album by American singer-songwriter Sam Barber, released on November 1, 2024, through Lockeland Springs and Atlantic. A double album, it is his first collection of studio material since his debut extended play, Million Eyes (2023) which contained his mainstream breakthrough single, "Straight and Narrow". Alongside "Straight and Narrow", which re-appears on Restless Mind the album features a guest appearance from Lily Fitts and two from Avery Anna, among them the internationally-charting "Indigo". The album and its songs were received positively by critics, drawing recurrent comparisons to Zach Bryan. On June 19, 2025, the album was certified platinum by Music Canada; by July 31, the album was certified gold by the Recording Industry Association of America (RIAA). By April 2025, the album had amassed over 1.5 billion streams.

Professional ratings
Review scores
Source	Rating
AllMusic	3.5/5 stars

== Track listing ==
Disc one
No.	Title	Writer(s)	Length
1.	"Man You Raised"	Sam Barber	4:09
2.	"Cold Dark Place"	Amy Allen; Barber; Eliz Rizk	3:01
3.	"Thought of You"	Allen; Barber; Rizk	2:43
4.	"G-PA"	Barber	0:41
5.	"Restless Mind" (featuring Avery Anna)	Avery Anna; Barber	3:40
6.	"Due Time"	Barber	3:54
7.	"Better Year"	Anna; Barber	3:20
8.	"Long Way to Go"	Barber	2:58
9.	"Bet on My Ghost"	Barber	3:25
10.	"Will You Be There"	Barber	3:08
11.	"76"	Barber	3:19
12.	"Jersey Giant"	Tyler Childers	3:43
13.	"Down the Road"	Barber	3:53
14.	"S.O.B."	Barber	3:03
Total length:			44:57

Disc two
No.	Title	Writer(s)	Length
1.	"Evil Place"	Barber	4:18
2.	"Gambler"	Barber	3:28
3.	"Morning Time"	Barber; Elizabeth Nichols	2:54
4.	"Indigo" (featuring Avery Anna)	Anna; Barber; Andy Sheridan	4:46
5.	"Different Kind of Pain"	Allen; Barber; Rizk	2:50
6.	"Streetlight"	Barber	3:12
7.	"Never Mine"	Barber	4:03
8.	"V"	Barber	3:23
9.	"Stopped in Hell" (featuring Lily Fitts)	Barber; Lily Fitts	3:33
10.	"Stay the Night"	Barber	3:23
11.	"Straight and Narrow"	Barber	3:19
12.	"Home Ain't Far"	Barber	3:15
13.	"Let Me Down"	Barber	3:11
14.	"You Know I Know"	Barber	3:24
Total length:			48:53

== Charts ==
=== Weekly charts ===
Weekly chart performance for Restless Mind
Chart (2024–2025)	Peak position
Australian Albums (ARIA)	47
Canadian Albums (Billboard)	21
Norwegian Albums (VG-lista)	22
UK Americana Albums (Official Charts)	5
US Billboard 200	48
US Top Country Albums (Billboard)	9

=== Year-end charts ===
Year-end chart performance for Restless Mind
Chart (2025)	Position
Australian Albums (ARIA)	74
Canadian Albums (Billboard)	47
US Billboard 200	88
US Top Country Albums (Billboard)	15

== Certifications ==
Region	Certification	Certified units/sales
Canada (Music Canada)	Platinum	80,000^{‡}
United States (RIAA)	Gold	500,000^{‡}
^{‡} Sales+streaming figures based on certification alone.
