= Visions (Alice Merton album) =

Studio album by Alice Merton
- Released: 16 January 2026
- Studio: Flóki (Iceland)
- Genre: Pop
- Length: 43:48
- Label: Paper Plane
- Producer: Alice Merton; Jennifer Decilveo; James Dring; Rich Cooper; Paul Whalley

Alice Merton chronology
S.I.D.E.S. (2022)	Visions (2026)

Singles from Visions
- 1. "Ignorance Is Bliss" Released: 26 September 2025; 2. "Cruel Intentions" Released: 14 November 2025; 3. "Landline" Released: 11 December 2025

Visions is the third studio album by German-Canadian singer Alice Merton. It was primarily recorded in Flóki Studios, Iceland, alongside other several locations. The album was released independently on 16 January 2026, through Paper Plane Records. After the release of her second studio album, S.I.D.E.S. (2022), she released an EP titled Heron and its deluxe edition in 2024. In September 2025, she revealed Vision's cover artwork; its lead single "Ignorance Is Bliss" was soon announced, being available on 26 September along with the music video filmed in Iceland. The album was further preceded by two remaining singles, "Cruel Intentions" and "Landline".

Merton co-wrote and produced every song in the album with the assistance from Dan Smith, Jennifer Decilveo, James Dring, Rich Cooper and Paul Whalley. Visions is a pop record, mainly about blind trust in oneself and one's vision. Upon release, it received generally positive reviews from music critics, peaking at number 66 in Germany.

== Background and recording ==
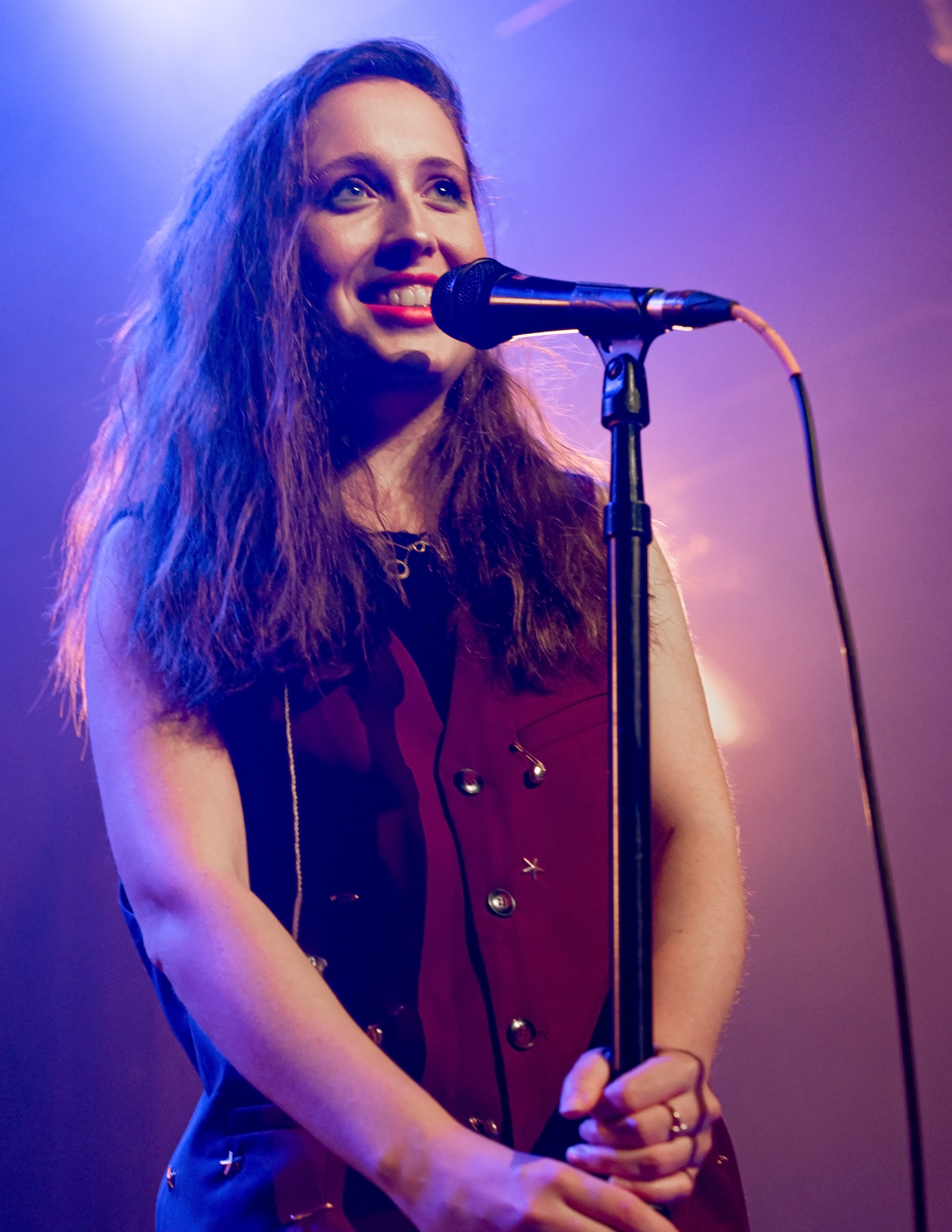
Merton on 22 May 2024 at the Troubadour

Merton met viral success with her debut single, "No Roots" (2016). It had charted at number 1 in Iceland and Billboard's Rock & Alternative Airplay chart, as well as number 2 in her native country, Germany. Her debut studio album, Mint (2019), received generally favorable reviews from Metacritic, peaking at number 2 in German Albums charts. However, her 2022 album S.I.D.E.S. failed to chart in other territories; it only charted at number 28 in Germany. In 2024, the five-track extended play Heron and its deluxe edition, Heron II, were released.

Visions was recorded in several places, such as Iceland, New York, London and Los Angeles; seven of the songs in the album were recorded in Flóki Studios, Iceland. Merton described the studio as "the perfect way to focus on the vision for this album", noting that its remote location and "the most stunning landscape" she had ever seen contributed to the creative atmosphere.

== Music and theme ==
Produced by Dan Smith, Jenn Decilveo, Paul Whalley, James Dring, and Rich Cooper, Visions is an "empowering, unapologetic pop record". Its theme is about blind trust in oneself and one's own vision. The album centers on themes of independence, resilience, and self-determination; it explores the creative process through moments of doubt, risk-taking, and persistence.

Merton described Visions as being about "the creative vision and the ups and downs that come with it", explaining that it reflects "the days you don't want to do anything, the days you achieve so much", as well as the doubts and questions faced along the way, driven by an "indescribable love for a certain project".

== Release and promotion ==
Merton revealed her third studio album, Visions, on 13 September 2025, alongside its cover artwork. On 18 Septepmber, she started to tease materials through her social media platforms, offering a preview of then-upcoming lead single. Four days later, she revealed its title and release date. The singer started to leak three alternative cover artworks of Visions on 21 October, 28 October and 4 November. On 9 November, she revealed the track list of the album.

Three singles preceded Visions; the lead single "Ignorance Is Bliss", co-produced with Jennifer Decilveo, was released on 25 September. A accompanying music video for the song was filmed in Iceland and directed by Merton. Rich Cooper co-produced the second single, "Cruel Intentions", released on 14 November. "Landline" was released as the third and final single from Visions on 12 December. In support of the album, Merton is set to embark on the tour, beginning from Berlin, Germany in March 2026.

On 13 January 2026, Merton revealed The Visions podcast on her social media. In the podcast, she interviews guests exploring their dreams, aspirations and the journeys they've taken to pursue them.

== Critical reception ==
Professional ratings
Review scores
Source	Rating
AllMusic	3.5/5 stars
Mix1	7/8 stars

Writing for AllMusic, Marcy Donelson described Visions as Merton's first fully independent release and a statement of self-reliance, adding that she sounds "more self-assured than ever". Mix1 noted the album as her most consistent statement of independence and argued that the album reflects her willingness to embrace discomfort in pursuit of authenticity. FluxFM believed that it stands as Merton's most uncompromising work to date; they highlighted its clear artistic vision, defined structure, and sharp hooks.

== Track listing ==
All tracks were produced by Alice Merton and Jennifer Decilveo, except where noted.

Visions track listing
No.	Title	Writer(s)	Producer(s)	Length
1.	"Ignorance Is Bliss"	Alice Merton; Jennifer Decilveo; Dan Smith; Paul Whalley		3:35
2.	"Coasting"	Merton; Decilveo; Smith; Whalley		3:25
3.	"Visions"	Merton; James Dring	Merton; Dring; Whalley	3:28
4.	"Cruel Intentions"	Merton; Rich Cooper; Jonny Lattimer	Merton; Cooper	2:53
5.	"Boogie Man"	Merton; Decilveo; Whalley		3:19
6.	"Mirage"	Merton; Whalley; Julien Emery	Merton; Whalley	3:22
7.	"Jane Street"	Merton; Decilveo		3:00
8.	"On the Wire"	Merton; Decilveo; Smith; Whalley		3:38
9.	"Willow Trees in Tokyo"	Merton; Decilveo; Smith		3:24
10.	"Joyriding"	Merton; Decilveo; Whalley		3:06
11.	"Landline"	Merton; Decilveo; Smith; Whalley		3:05
12.	"Marigold"	Merton; Cooper	Merton; Cooper	4:07
13.	"Treasure Island"	Merton; Decilveo		3:39
Total length:				43:48

== Charts ==
Chart performance
Chart (2026)	Peak position
German Albums (Offizielle Top 100)	66

== Release history ==
List of release dates and formats
Region	Date	Format	Label	Ref.
Various	16 January 2026	CD; digital download; LP; streaming	Paper Plane	
