= Drastic Measures (Bayonne album) =

Studio album by Bayonne
- Released: February 22, 2019
- Length: 45:00
- Label: Mom + Pop

Bayonne chronology
| Primitives (2016) | Drastic Measures (2019) |

Singles from Drastic Measures
- 1. "I Know" Released: June 1, 2018; 2. "Uncertainly Deranged" Released: November 7, 2018; 3. "Drastic Measures" Released: January 16, 2019; 4. "Same" Released: February 6, 2019

Professional ratings
Aggregate scores
| Source | Rating |
|---|---|
| Metacritic | 73/100 |
Review scores
| Source | Rating |
| AllMusic | 3.5/5 stars |
| Austin Chronicle | 3/5 stars |
| The Skinny | 4/5 stars |

Drastic Measures is the second studio album by American electronic musician Bayonne. It was released on February 22, 2019 through Mom + Pop Music.

== Track listing ==
| No. | Title | Length |
|---|---|---|
| 1. | "QA" | 5:44 |
| 2. | "Drastic Measures" | 4:45 |
| 3. | "Same" | 3:40 |
| 4. | "Gift" | 5:12 |
| 5. | "Enders" | 3:17 |
| 6. | "I Know" | 4:25 |
| 7. | "Kind" | 3:30 |
| 8. | "Uncertainly Deranged" | 4:35 |
| 9. | "Abilia" | 5:06 |
| 10. | "Bothering" | 4:46 |

== Charts ==
| Chart | Peak position |
|---|---|
| Billboard US Dance/Electronic Album Sales | 8 |
