= Primitives =

Primitives may refer to:

- Primitive (philately), crudely designed early postage stamps

== Arts ==
- Primitive decorating, American art style
- The Primitives, 1980s English alternative rock band
- The Primitives, alternative country band, precursor to Uncle Tupelo
- The Primitives, parody band formed in 1964 with Lou Reed and John Cale
- The Primitives, 1960s British band, active in Italy 1965–1970, led by Mal Ryder
- The Primitives (film), 1962 British film directed by Alfred Travers
- The Primitives, a 1966 novelette by Frank Herbert
- Artists of the early International Gothic period of art, in particular:
  - Early Renaissance painting
  - Early Netherlandish painting
- Primitives (album), an album by Bayonne

== Computing ==
- Cryptographic primitives, low-level cryptographic algorithms frequently used to build computer security systems
- Primitives (computer graphics), basic graphic elements such as lines or curves, used to create computer images

== See also ==
- Primitive (disambiguation)
