= Straight and narrow =

Straight and narrow or strait and narrow may refer to:

- strait is the gate, and narrow is the way, which leadeth unto life, a phrase from Matthew 7:14
- "Straight and Narrow" (The Outer Limits), a television episode
- The Straight and Narrow, a 1918 film starring Oliver Hardy
- "Walk the Straight and Narrow", an episode of Batman
- the strait and narrow path described in the tree of life vision in the Book of Mormon
- "Straight and Narrow" (song), by Sam Barber
