= S.I.D.E.S. =

Studio album by Alice Merton
- Released: 17 June 2022
- Length: 48:27
- Label: Paper Planes; Mom + Pop
- Producer: Alice Merton; Beatgees; Christian Neander; Jenn Decilveo; Jens Schneider; Jonny Coffer; Jules Kalmbacher; Moritz Pirker; Paul Whalley; Stephen Kozmeniuk; Tim Morten Uhlenbrock; Tobias Kuhn

Alice Merton chronology
Mint (2019)	S.I.D.E.S. (2022)	Visions (2026)

Singles from S.I.D.E.S.
- 1. "Vertigo" Released: 8 April 2021; 2. "Hero" Released: 9 September 2021; 3. "Island" Released: 9 September 2021; 4. "Same Team" Released: 4 March 2022; 5. "Blindside" Released: 7 April 2022; 6. "Loveback" Released: 13 May 2022

S.I.D.E.S. is the second studio album by German-Canadian singer Alice Merton, released on 17 June 2022 through Paper Planes and Mom + Pop Music.

== Background ==
In a video interview, Merton revealed that a former collaborator gave her an ultimatum, threatening to end their partnership if she worked with other producers. She described the situation as deeply personal, likening it to having "a gun to [her] head", and shared that it contributed to emotional strain during the album's creation.

Rather than pulling from her distant past, Merton found inspiration directly in her present-day life — capturing moments full of familiarity and friction, comfort and anxiety. From the opening track "Loveback" to the cathartic closer "The Other Side", the album traces a visceral, emotionally charged journey. Reflecting on the release, Merton shared mixed feelings, saying she was happy the album was finally out, but nervous about how listeners would perceive it now that it was no longer hers alone.

== Singles ==
On 8 April 2021, the lead single "Vertigo" was released. It was followed by two singles, "Hero" and "Island," which were both released on 9 September 2021. Subsequent singles included "Same Team" on 4 March 2022, "Blindside" on 7 April 2022, and "Loveback" on 13 May 2022.

== Critical reception ==
S.I.D.E.S. ratings
Review scores
Source	Rating
AllMusic	4/5 stars
Beats Per Minute	67%

AllMusic described S.I.D.E.S. as a lyrically existential and confrontational album shaped by the pandemic and personal turmoil. The review also noted its darker, more abrasive sound and emphasized Merton's full creative involvement across all tracks.

== Track listing ==
S.I.D.E.S. track listing
No.	Title	Writer(s)	Length
1.	"Loveback"	Alice Merton; Tim Morten Uhlenbrock	3:39
2.	"Island"	Merton; Uhlenbrock	3:10
3.	"Future"	Merton; Jules Kalmbacher; Jens Schneider	3:50
4.	"Same Team"	Merton; Kalmbacher; Schneider; Uhlenbrock	3:33
5.	"Blurry"	Merton; Uhlenbrock	3:32
6.	"Everything"	Merton; Beatgees	3:51
7.	"Blindside"	Merton; Tobias Kuhn	3:40
8.	"Shiny Things"	Merton; Christian Neander	2:08
9.	"100 Stories"	Merton; Neander	3:43
10.	"Hero"	Merton; Jonny Coffer	2:27
11.	"Mania"	Merton; Jenn Decilveo	2:59
12.	"Vertigo"	Merton; Stephen Kozmeniuk	3:08
13.	"Breathe In, Breathe Out"	Merton; Neander	1:40
14.	"Letting You Know"	Merton; Moritz Pirker	3:37
15.	"The Other Side"	Merton; Coffer	3:30
Total length:			48:27

== Charts ==
Chart performance for S.I.D.E.S.
Chart (2022)	Peak position
German Albums (Offizielle Top 100)	28

== Personnel ==
Credits were adapted from AllMusic.

=== Executive Production & Management ===
- Alice Merton – primary artist, composer, producer, executive producer
- Anna Weigner – executive producer
- Heiko Mark – executive producer, management
- Paul Grauwinkel – executive producer, management

=== Composition & Production ===
- Beatgees – composer, producer
- Christian Neander – composer, producer
- Jenn Decilveo – composer, producer
- Jens Schneider – composer, producer
- Jonny Coffer – composer, producer
- Jules Kalmbacher – composer, producer
- Moritz Pirker – composer, guitar, mixing, producer
- Stephen Kozmeniuk – composer, producer
- Tim Morten Uhlenbrock – composer, producer
- Tobias Kuhn – composer, producer
- Paul Whalley – producer

=== Performance & Instrumentation ===
- Björn Werra – bass
- Moritz Pirker – guitar
- Ulrich Rode – guitar
- Sebastian Schmidt – drums
- Sönke Reich – drums

=== Technical & Visual Staff ===
- Matty Green – mixing
- Nikodem Milewski – mastering, mixing
- John Davis – mastering
- Sascha Bühren – mastering
- Aykut Aydogdu – artwork
- Chris Merton – design
- Henry Harrlet – design
