= Odie Leigh =

American indie folk musician

Odie Leigh is an American indie folk singer-songwriter from Baton Rouge, Louisiana. Leigh is currently based in Detroit, Michigan. She first gained recognition through viral success on TikTok, where her original songs attracted a wide audience, leading to a full-time music career. Known for her emotional songwriting, Leigh’s work is characterized by creative lyricism and a blend of folk and indie pop influences. Her debut studio album, Carrier Pigeon (2024), marked her transition into a more produced sound.

== Early Life & Education ==
Born Lauren Hicks, Leigh was raised in Baton Rouge, Louisiana. She was introduced to music at a young age through participation in her church choir and later taught herself guitar while in middle school. Despite this early interest, she did not initially pursue music seriously and eventually stopped playing for a period of time. Initially, Leigh studied film at Loyola University in New Orleans and did not intend to pursue music professionally. There, she watched the music students working to learn music theory, play live gigs, and seek out a team to help grow their careers. During this time, she was surrounded by the traditional expectations surrounding musicianship, feeling that her informal approach to songwriting did not align with the rigor of her peers. However, her perspective in music shifted after hearing “Talkin’ Like You (Two Tall Mountains)” by Connie Converse, which helped inspire her to embrace music as a form of personal expression rather than technical perfection.

== Career ==
Leigh’s career began unexpectedly when she participated in a bet with her roommates to create a TikTok video. During the COVID-19 pandemic, she began writing songs again, picking up the guitar again as a creative outlet. After posting original songs on the platform, she quickly became viral, with her original song Crop Circles becoming a breakout success.

Her viral traction from TikTok allowed Leigh to create a fan-base without traditional industry backing and transition into a full-time music career. She was immediately recognized and officially signed to record label Mom + Pop Music. She then subsequently released a series of early projects, including the EP How Did It Seem to You (2022) and The Only Thing Worse Than a Woman Who Lies Is a Girl Who’ll Tell Truths (2023), which further established her artistry as a new emerging artist. Later in July 2024, Leigh released her debut studio album, Carrier Pigeon, through Mom + Pop Music. Produced in collaboration with Derek Ted, the album allowed her to expand her sound beyond stripped-down acoustic recordings, incorporating bigger production while maintaining her focus on her artistic songwriting. Carrier Pigeon was named one of "The best albums out July 12" from All Things Considered. Leigh was named "The Best of What's Next" by Paste in 2024. The album title reflects the idea of communicating feelings after the fact, with many songs written as reflections on past experiences.

Leigh has also developed a presence as a live performer, touring across the United States and internationally. After the release of How Did It Seem To You, she with Olive Klug and Kevin Atwater. She has appeared at major music festivals, including Newport Folk Festival and Outside Lands. Her live performances have been described as intimate and conversational, often reflecting the same emotional openness present in her recorded work.

== Discography ==
Singles

- Ronnie's Song (January 1st, 2021)
- Bigger Fish (January 29th, 2021)
- The Beast (March 12th, 2021)
- Nothing New (August 27th, 2021)
- Crop Circles (February 18th, 2022)
- Nine Lives (June 1st, 2022)
- A Month or Two (August 5th, 2022)
- Chutes & Ladders (April 7th, 2023)
- Double Shift (May 12th, 2023)
- Sheep Song (June 9th, 2023)
- No Doubt (January 25th, 2024)
- Either Way (March 21st, 2024)
- Conversation Starter (May 2nd, 2024)
- My Name on a T-Shirt (June 6th, 2024)
- Already (On My Mind) (July 10th, 2024)
- All Star Breakfast (feat. Field Medic) (November 9th, 2024)
- Rodeo Clown (Reimagined) (March 13th, 2026)
- Miss Leave Me Alone (September 25th 2026)

EPs

- How Did It Seem to You? (October 21st, 2022)
- The Only Thing Worse Than A Woman Who Lies Is A Girl Who'll Tell Truths (July 14th, 2023)

LPs

- Carrier Pigeon (July 12th, 2024)

Misc. Releases/Alternative Releases

- Crop Circles - Treehouse Tape Sessions (EP - December 2nd, 2022, Single - December 12th, 2022)
- A Month or Two (Treehouse Tape Sessions) (January 6th, 2023)
- How Did It Seem To You (Treehouse Tape Sessions) (January 27rd, 2023)
- Odie Leigh on Audiotree Live (August 10th, 2023)

== Artistry ==
Leigh’s music is most known for the direct and journal-like songwriting style, often writing about her personal experiences with relationships, insecurity, and young adulthood. She has described her creative process as intuitive and emotionally driven, frequently writing songs in the moment as a way of processing her feelings.

Her sound has a blend of elements of indie folk, Americana, and indie pop, specifically incorporating acoustic foundations with meaningful lyrics. Many critics have highlighted her emphasis on authenticity over technical precision. Her first album Carrier Pigeon, particularly demonstrates a progression toward more layered instrumentation while retaining the emotional immediacy that defines her songwriting. The album expands on specific themes, presenting songs written as reflections of past emotional moments. Known for her unpolished and intuitive approach to creating music, Leigh has emphasized that technical knowledge is secondary to authenticity, often recording with minimal equipment and embracing imperfections in her musical sound.

== Personal life ==
Leigh is now currently living in Detroit, Michigan, where she still continues to make music and perform. She continues to post on her social media accounts like TikTok and Instagram to promote her music.
