= Why So Serious (song) =

Single by Alice Merton

from the album Mint
- Released: 7 September 2018
- Length: 3:43
- Label: Paper Plane; Mom + Pop
- Songwriters: Alice Merton; Nicholas Rebscher
- Producer: John Hill

Alice Merton singles chronology
"Lash Out" (2018)	"Why So Serious" (2018)	"Funny Business" (2018)

Music video
- "Why So Serious" on YouTube

"Why So Serious" is a song by German-Canadian singer Alice Merton. It was released on 7 September 2018, as the third single from her debut studio album, Mint (2019). Merton co-wrote the song with producer Nicolas Rebscher.

== Composition ==
In discussing Mint, Merton described the album as a series of reminders to live without fear and to embrace the idea that home is not tied to one place. These themes are reflected in "Why So Serious", where she sings, "With every mistake there comes a lesson learned / So someone tell me / Why so serious? / Why are we so serious?"

== Charts ==
"Why So Serious" chart performance
Chart (2019)	Peak position
Austria (Ö3 Austria Top 40)	60
