= Lily Fitts =

American singer-songwriter

- Fitts in 2026

Background information
- Born: Lily Fitts; December 9, 2000 (age 25)
- Origin: Topsfield, Massachusetts, U.S.
- Genres: Indie folk, alt-country
- Occupation: Singer-songwriter
- Years active: 2023–present
- Label: Mom + Pop
- Website: lilyfittsmusic.com

Lily Fitts (born 2000) is an American singer-songwriter from Topsfield, Massachusetts. She first drew attention in 2023, when Noah Kahan, Zach Bryan and the Lumineers reposted videos of her singing their songs. Her debut album, Getting By, was released in 2025, and her EP, Calling It Quits, was released on November 6, 2026.

== Early life and education ==
Fitts was born in Topsfield and grew up in Cambridge, Massachusetts. She began taking guitar lessons at age nine and says she started writing songs at around the same time. She posted her first YouTube video at age ten, and later posted on Vine, Instagram and TikTok.

She graduated from the University of Massachusetts Amherst in 2023 with a degree in biochemistry and molecular biology. She had been on a pre-medical track. Fitts said she worked in a cardiology unit for a short time after graduating, before deciding to pursue music.

== Career ==
=== Early career ===
Fitts posted cover songs online for years before building a following. A version of Kahan's "Stick Season" with rewritten lyrics, posted to TikTok, passed two million views and drew a repost and reaction from Kahan. In June 2023, NBC Boston reported that Kahan, Bryan and the Lumineers had each reposted her covers and that she had about 100,000 followers across TikTok and Instagram.

Her debut single, "Hurts Like Hell", was released in 2023, and she continued to release singles through 2024, including "Brown Eyed Baby" and "Lose You Now". She is a featured artist on "Stopped in Hell", a track on Sam Barber's album Restless Mind. In 2024 she opened for Michael Marcagi.

=== Getting By and first headlining tour (2025) ===
Fitts released her debut album, Getting By, on June 27, 2025, through Thirty Knots Records. The album has ten tracks. According to Songwriting Magazine, it was made in Los Angeles and Nashville with a small group of co-writers, and the title track is the only song Fitts wrote alone. The magazine described the album as moving through breakups, grief and anger.

Fitts played FairWell Festival and the Levitate Music and Arts Festival in 2025, and opened for Noah Kahan at BST Hyde Park in London. Her first headlining tour, the Getting By Tour, visited 11 U.S. cities, beginning at The Rebel Lounge in Phoenix, Arizona, on October 7, 2025. It ended with a sold-out show at The Sinclair in Cambridge in November 2025. In December 2025 she joined Max McNown on his European tour dates, starting in Dublin.

=== 2026–present ===
In January 2026, Fitts performed "Lose You Now" on the CBS News program Saturday Sessions. She headlined a North American tour in 2026, which included a May 3 show at 3S Artspace in Portsmouth, New Hampshire.

"Mess of Me" was released on May 1, 2026, on Mom + Pop Music. "River", a collaboration with Cheat Codes (DJs), followed on July 31, 2026. "Take Me Down", featuring Michael Marcagi, was released on October 7, 2026, and is the lead single from the five-track EP, Calling It Quits. She is scheduled to perform at Noah Kahan's Out of the Blue Festival in Cancún, Mexico, on January 7–10, 2027.

== Musical style ==
Fitts's music has been described as indie folk with alternative country influences. She has named Noah Kahan, the Lumineers, Fleetwood Mac and Stevie Nicks among her influences, and has said she writes about her own experiences.

== Discography ==
=== Studio albums ===
Title	Details
Getting By	Released: June 27, 2025; Label: Thirty Knots

=== Extended plays ===
Title	Details
Calling It Quits	Released: November 6, 2026; Label: Mom + Pop; Tracks: "Mess of Me", "Tolerance", "Take Me Down" (feat. Michael Marcagi), "Calling It Quits", "Notice"

=== Singles ===
Title	Year	Album
"Hurts Like Hell"	2023	Non-album single
"I Know What It Isn't"	2023	Non-album single
"What They Say"	2024	Non-album single
"Lose You Now"	2024	Non-album single
"Over Your Head"	2024	Non-album single
"Brown Eyed Baby"	2024	Getting By
"Buying Time"	2024	Non-album single
"Boston to Barcelona"	2024	Non-album single
"In the Dirt"	2025	Getting By
"Some Kind of Evil"	2025	Getting By
"Made to Believe It"	2025	Getting By
"Good Riddance"	2025	Getting By
"Mess of Me"	2026	Calling It Quits
"River" (with Cheat Codes)	2026	Non-album single
"Take Me Down" (feat. Michael Marcagi)	2026	Calling It Quits

=== Guest appearances ===
Title	Year	Other artist(s)	Album
"Stopped in Hell"	2024	Sam Barber	Restless Mind
