= Olive Klug =

American folk singer-songwriter (born 1997)

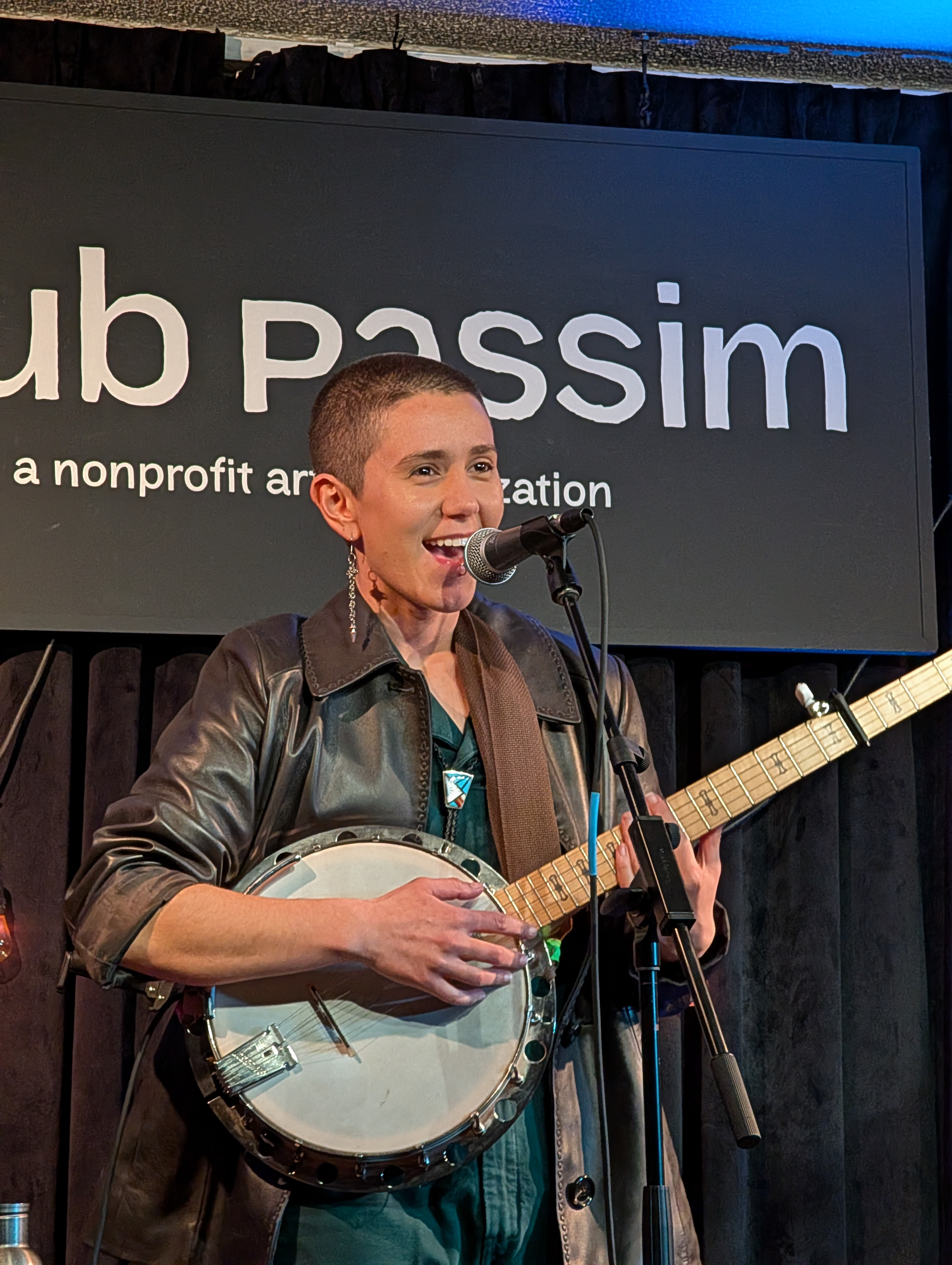
Klug performing in 2026

Olive Klug (born 1996 or 1997) is an American folk singer-songwriter known for their music about discovering identity, finding community, and navigating the human experience of life. Klug's music gained notoriety during the 2020– pandemic through social media platforms such as TikTok, and they now tour under the Signature Sounds music label.

== Early life and education ==
Klug grew up in Portland, Oregon. As a child, they participated in musical theatre, sang a cappella and took guitar lessons. They graduated from Wilsonville High School in 2015.

In college, Klug studied psychology and sociology, intending to pursue a Master of Social Work and become a therapist. They earned their bachelor's in 2019 and worked for several months at a rehab facility. During their senior year, conversations with friends emboldened them to pursue music as a full-time career.

== Career ==
Klug released their debut EP, Fire Alarm, in 2019, featuring songs they wrote throughout high school and college.

In 2020, early during the COVID-19 pandemic, Klug began sharing videos of their music on TikTok. Their account became popular, eventually amassing more than 175,000 followers. They toured with Odie Leigh and Kevin Atwater in 2022.

In 2023, Klug released their first full-length album, Don't You Dare Make Me Jaded, with Nettwerk Music Group. Written mostly in 2021, the album is about "deconstructing the expectations I had for myself and finding joy even though the world is really bleak," Klug told The Texas Observer.

In 2025, Klug released their second full-length album Lost Dog with Signature Sounds.

Klug has named Joni Mitchell, Kimya Dawson, Adrianne Lenker, and Mal Blum as musical influences.

== Personal life ==
Klug is non-binary and uses they/them pronouns. They split their time living in Massachusetts or a Sprinter Van, and, as of 2023, were in a relationship with a nonbinary partner.
