= Michael Goldstone =

American music executive

- Occupations: Music industry executive; entrepreneur; A&R executive
- Organization: Mom + Pop Music
- Known for: Co-founding Mom + Pop Music
- Website: momandpopmusic.com

Michael Goldstone is an American music industry executive and owner of Mom + Pop Music.

Goldstone began his career at Chrysalis Records in Los Angeles doing Public Relations, working with Blondie, Pat Benatar, Huey Lewis and others before moving on to MCA Records, where he worked in marketing and artist development before moving into A&R. Segueing to PolyGram, he signed Mother Love Bone and, after the death of lead singer Andrew Wood, signed the remaining members to Epic Records. This band became Pearl Jam. Also while at Epic, “Goldie” signed Rage Against the Machine and many others such as BRAD and Shudder to Think, who previously released their music on Discord. He was also responsible for the release of the Soundtrack to the movie Singles, directed by Cameron Crowe.

In 1996, he joined DreamWorks Records as a partner, where he was instrumental in building the company's A&R, marketing and promotion departments. Goldstone signed Buckcherry and The All-American Rejects, to the label which both went on to Platinum success. At DreamWorks, he was also responsible for such artists as Citizen Cope and Long Beach Dub All Stars. In 2003, Goldie moved to Sire Records where he re-launched the label with Chairman, Seymour Stein. While at Sire, his signings included Regina Spektor, Tegan and Sara, Against Me!, HIM, The Spill Canvas and The Veronicas.

In May 2008, Goldie left Sire to launch indie label Mom + Pop Music Company together with Peter Mensch and Cliff Burnstein of Q Prime. As Chairman at Mom + Pop, the label has released records from the following artists: Sleigh Bells, Andrew Bird, Ingrid Michaelson (via Cabin 24), Tokyo Police Club, Joshua Radin, The Freelance Whales (with Frenchkiss), Neon Indian. In 2013, the label released albums from Flume, FIDLAR, Poliça, Lucius, Hunters, and Sleigh Bells. Mom + Pop's most recent releases include albums from Ingrid Michaelson, Wild Cub, Courtney Barnett, Parquet Courts (with WYR), Cloud Nothings (with Carpark Records), Tokyo Police Club, and Kindness. Goldstone also manages American rock band Cage The Elephant alongside Peter Mensch and Cliff Burnstein.
