= Bayonne (musician) =

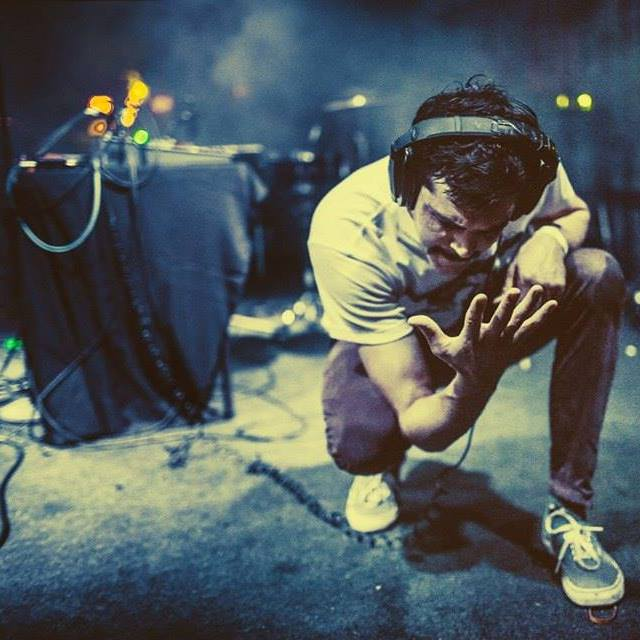
- Bayonne during a live set in 2015

Background information
- Also known as: Bayonne
- Born: Roger Sellers
- Origin: Austin, Texas, United States
- Genres: Electronic, Ambient, Dream pop, Americana
- Labels: Mom + Pop Music, City Slang, Spunk, Nettwerk
- Website: www.bayonneofficial.com

Roger Sellers, also known by his stage name Bayonne, is an American minimalist composer and electronic musician based in Austin, Texas, United States. After releasing four albums under his own name, Sellers adopted the Bayonne moniker. His 2014 album Primitives was reissued under that name in 2016 by Mom + Pop Music and City Slang. He has since released three more albums as Bayonne: Drastic Measures (2019) on Mom + Pop, and Temporary Time (2023) and Filters (2026) on Nettwerk. Bayonne is known for creating and layering intricate loops, combined with field recordings, as well as for his one-man live performances.

== Career ==
=== As Roger Sellers ===
Sellers released four albums under his own name between 2010 and 2014, exploring what AllMusic called "electro-acoustic avant-folk".

Sellers released 8 Songs one song a week as a free download, writing each new song while the previous one was available, and completed the album on December 31, 2012.

The fourth album, Primitives, was released by Punctum Records.

=== As Bayonne ===
Sellers then adopted the stage name Bayonne, and Primitives was reissued under it by Mom + Pop Music in 2016. Magdalen Jenne of PopMatters rated the reissue 8 out of 10 and called it "a phenomenally crafted first statement", while Flood's Michael Duncan gave it 6 out of 10, describing it as "catchy, minimalist, and percussive".

"Appeals", a song from Primitives, was featured on the soundtrack of the 2016 EA Sports game FIFA 17.

In November 2018, Bayonne announced his second album under the pseudonym, Drastic Measures, released by Mom + Pop on February 22, 2019. Sellers played all of the instruments and produced the album himself. It reached the top ten of Billboard's US Dance/Electronic Album Sales chart. The Skinny's Eugenie Johnson called it "a firm step up from Primitives", with "the most fully-formed tracks that Sellers has produced to date". Marcy Donelson of AllMusic found it "more distinctive and memorable for its unique textures than things like melodies and grooves". In The Irish Times, Louise Bruton noted that "while the content could be perceived as downbeat, the pace of Drastic Measures is surprisingly upbeat". Elise Barbin of The Austin Chronicle wrote that Sellers "delivers baroque for the poptimist age", though she found that "a few latter-half tracks become saccharine, at times bordering on the generic".

Sellers signed to Nettwerk in 2022, and the label released his third album as Bayonne, Temporary Time, in May 2023. It drew on the period from his father's cancer diagnosis in 2019 to his father's death three years later. Annie Zaleski of the Houston Chronicle described the album as "warm and immersive, swirling with dense layers of keyboards and stacked vocal harmonies". Beats per Minute scored it 79%, with Kristy Sawyer praising its "layer upon layer upon layer of textural electronica creating lush soundscapes" and calling it "one of the most successful rebirths and evolutions of an artist". Joey Willis of Glide Magazine found it "a solid electronic pop album with a lot to offer the listener, especially on repeat listens".

In March 2024, he released Temporary Time (Orchestrated), an orchestral reworking of the album made with composer Nathaniel Earl.

His fourth album as Bayonne, Filters, was released by Nettwerk on September 4, 2026. It deals with Sellers working through his grief after his father's death. Jeremy McDonagh of PopMatters rated Filters 8 out of 10, calling it "an undeniably pleasing record, and often an astonishingly detailed one", with production "pristine without becoming sterile"; he praised how its "disparate textures coexist ... with remarkable harmony", though he occasionally "wanted one of those elements to refuse to cooperate", and concluded that the album's "most memorable moments are those that threaten that perfection". In Melodic Magazine, Ezra Kendrick called it "a cohesive, dreamy and wonderful 10-track album", while finding that repetition in its first half could make "the songs sound a little too alike".

== Live performances ==
Sellers performs as a one-man act, building songs from live loops while playing drums, keyboards and guitar and singing. In later years he has been joined on stage by a drummer.

Reviewing the 2016 live video for "Appeals", NPR's Robin Hilton wrote that Sellers "makes live looping look like an endurance sport ... he breathlessly dances, lays down tracks and darts between a tangle of mixers and drums in a series of perfectly orchestrated maneuvers." Sellers told NPR that the song "takes the most work involved in playing live because there are more simultaneous loops brought in and out than any other song in my set".

Before the 2019 Drastic Measures tour, Adrian Spinelli of the San Francisco Chronicle wrote that "seeing Sellers seemingly lose himself while breathing life into the tunes is a riveting sight". In the Houston Chronicle, ahead of the 2023 Temporary Time tour, Zaleski wrote that "Bayonne's concerts are as energetic and interactive as any full-band show".

== Discography ==
as Roger Sellers

Studio albums

- Roger Sellers (2010)
- Moments (2011, Pau Wau Records)
- 8 Songs (2012)
- Primitives (2014, Punctum Records)

as Bayonne

Studio albums

- Primitives (2016, reissue on Mom + Pop Music)
- Drastic Measures (2019, Mom + Pop Music)
- Temporary Time (2023, Nettwerk)
- Filters (2026, Nettwerk)

Compilations

- Early Recordings (2006–2012) (2025, recordings made as Roger Sellers)

EPs

- I Know (2018, Mom + Pop Music)
- Temporary Time (Orchestrated) (2024, Nettwerk, with Nathaniel Earl)
