= Indigo (Sam Barber song) =

2024 single by Sam Barber featuring Avery Anna

Single by Sam Barber featuring Avery Anna

from the album Restless Mind
- Released: October 31, 2024
- Genre: Country
- Length: 4:46 (album version); 3:44 (radio edit)
- Label: Lockeland Springs; Atlantic
- Songwriters: Sam Barber; Avery Anna; Andy Sheridan
- Producer: Joe Becker

Sam Barber singles chronology
"Restless Mind" (2024)	"Indigo" (2024)	"Man of the Year" (2025)

Avery Anna singles chronology
"Restless Mind" (2024)	"Indigo" (2024)	"Low Road" (2024)

"Indigo" is a song by the American country singer Sam Barber, with the American singer Avery Anna. It was released on October 31, 2024, as the eighth single from his debut studio album, Restless Mind, which was released the following day. It was the first song to chart from both artists, peaking at number 40 on the Billboard Hot 100. The song gained popularity through the video-sharing app TikTok, and it impacted country radio on February 24, 2025.

== Content ==
The lyrics are sung from the perspective of two heartbroken ex-lovers. Sam Barber begins by acknowledging that his former lover is worried about his well-being and expresses regret for leaving them. In the pre-chorus, he wonders if his pain is a result of God teaching him a lesson and he has changed since the breakup. The chorus uses metaphors describing how he no longer feels joy and his emotions are now full of gloom and melancholy: "I used to shine bright like gold / Now I'm all indigo / My colors are darker and cold / I think it's time that I went home". The last line may refer to both leaving the bar where he is drinking to deal with his grief and reconcile with his lover. Avery Anna performs the second verse, in which she suggests she still loves her partner but left them due to the pressures of commitment before further highlighting her sadness and hope to be offered salvation from God.

== Charts ==
=== Weekly charts ===
Weekly chart performance for "Indigo"
Chart (2024–2025)	Peak position
Australia (ARIA)	23
Austria (Ö3 Austria Top 40)	53
Canada (Canadian Hot 100)	23
Canada Country (Billboard)	57
Germany (GfK)	81
Global 200 (Billboard)	77
Ireland (IRMA)	20
Lithuania Airplay (TopHit)	99
New Zealand (Recorded Music NZ)	20
Norway (VG-lista)	16
Sweden (Sverigetopplistan)	19
Switzerland (Schweizer Hitparade)	92
UK Singles (OCC)	33
US Billboard Hot 100	40
US Country Airplay (Billboard)	37
US Hot Country Songs (Billboard)	8

=== Year-end charts ===
Year-end chart performance for "Indigo"
Chart (2025)	Position
Australia (ARIA)	37
Canada (Canadian Hot 100)	57
Global 200 (Billboard)	194
New Zealand (Recorded Music NZ)	29
Sweden (Sverigetopplistan)	95
US Billboard Hot 100	49
US Hot Country Songs (Billboard)	12

== Certifications ==
Certifications for "Indigo"
Region	Certification	Certified units/sales
Australia (ARIA)	2× Platinum	140,000^{‡}
Canada (Music Canada)	2× Platinum	160,000^{‡}
New Zealand (RMNZ)	2× Platinum	60,000^{‡}
United Kingdom (BPI)	Gold	400,000^{‡}
United States (RIAA)	Platinum	1,000,000^{‡}
^{‡} Sales+streaming figures based on certification alone.
