= No Roots (EP) =

2017 extended play by Alice Merton

EP by Alice Merton
- Released: 3 February 2017
- Length: 16:35
- Label: Paper Plane; Mom + Pop
- Producer: Alice Merton; Nicolas Rebscher

Alice Merton chronology
No Roots (2017)	Mint (2019)

Singles from No Roots
- 1. "No Roots" Released: 2 December 2016; 2. "Hit the Ground Running" Released: 4 August 2017

No Roots is the debut extended play by German-Canadian-English singer Alice Merton, released on 3 February 2017 and produced by Alice Merton and Nicolas Rebscher. It was later released in the US on 6 April 2018.

== Songs ==
Regarding the No Roots EP, Merton stated that it reflects her personal experiences over the previous two years, especially her sense of not feeling at home. The title track "No Roots" represents this theme and her acceptance of the positives of a nomadic lifestyle. "Hit the Ground Running" is an empowering song designed to motivate both Merton and her listeners to actively pursue their goals, with production intended to evoke the energy of running. "Jealousy" was the most challenging track, taking over six months to write, and personifies the emotion as an unequal struggle between two forces. "Lie to My Face" explores experiences of dishonesty in relationships, pairing dark, dramatic production with lyrics that ironically encourage continued deception.

== Track listing ==
No Roots – International edition
No.	Title	Length
1.	"No Roots"	3:55
2.	"Jealousy"	3:39
3.	"Hit the Ground Running"	2:52
4.	"Lie to My Face"	2:55
Total length:		13:21

No Roots – US edition
No.	Title	Length
1.	"No Roots"	3:55
2.	"Lash Out"	3:14
3.	"Jealousy"	3:39
4.	"Hit the Ground Running"	2:52
5.	"Lie to My Face"	2:55
Total length:		16:35

== Charts ==
No Roots chart performance
Chart (2018)	Peak position
US Billboard 200	171
US Top Rock Albums (Billboard)	30
US Top Alternative Albums (Billboard)	14
