= Sam Barber (singer) =

American singer-songwriter (born 2003)

- Born: Samuel Robert Barber; April 15, 2003 (age 23); Frohna, Missouri, U.S.
- Genres: Country; rock; folk
- Occupation: Singer-songwriter
- Instruments: Vocals; guitar
- Years active: 2021–present
- Labels: Lockeland Springs; Atlantic Records
- Website: sambarbermusic.com

Samuel Robert Barber (born April 15, 2003) is an American singer and songwriter. He has released two albums, three EPs, and several singles. Most of his music has been released through Lockeland Springs under Atlantic Records. His first song to chart in the U.S. was his 2022 single "Straight and Narrow," and he later reached the Billboard Hot 100 in 2024 with "Indigo" (featuring Avery Anna). Both songs are now certified platinum by the RIAA.

== Early life ==
Sam Barber was born in the rural town of Frohna, Missouri and raised on his family's large ancestral farm. His father was a mechanic and his mother was a nurse. When Barber was 16, he began to play music and write songs after learning of his great-grandfather's music ability. Before pursuing a career in music, he enrolled in the civil engineering program at the State Technical College of Missouri.

== Career ==
=== 2021–2022: Social media and American Idol ===
Beginning in 2021, while still enrolled at the State Technical College, Barber released videos on short-form social media platform TikTok performing original songs as well as covers. His first video on the platform displaying his music was posted on March 14, 2021. Barber first gained popularity on the platform when he posted a video of himself performing a cover of Lynyrd Skynyrd's "Simple Man", followed by videos of covers of "Dancing in the Sky" by English duo Dani and Lizzy—which he later released as a single—and "Ophelia" by The Lumineers.

On September 6, 2021, Barber would release his first single, "Run Away High", via digital download and streaming.

In late 2021 and early 2022, Sam Barber auditioned during the filming of the twentieth season of American Idol. Although he received a golden ticket to Hollywood Week following his performance, he was eliminated and neither his audition nor his performance at Hollywood Week would air.

Barber's next release wouldn't be until May of the following year with the single "Ramblin Man" on May 8, 2022. Another long release gap appeared before the releases of "Straight and Narrow" on November 30 and "As Time Passes" on December 15, 2022. The former would eventually become his first charted song and certified gold by the RIAA.

=== 2023–present: Million Eyes and Restless Mind ===
Barber headlined his first event on June 11, 2023 during a sold-out performance at The Basement, a concert venue in Nashville, Tennessee. Shortly following this, Barber performed at Bruce Springsteen's BST Hyde Park series on July 8, and opened for Ed Sheeran on July 14 at a performance at the Royal Oak Theater. Only three months after his first headliner, Barber made his official Grand Ole Opry debut on September 23.

On September 21, 2023, Barber released his debut EP, Million Eyes, through Lockeland and Atlantic. This EP includes five previously released singles as well as three new songs. Barber has stated that his favorite song off the EP is "Save Me", a ballad about struggles with mental health.

On January 5, 2024, Barber released a live EP, Live EP 001, which includes live performances of some of the songs from Million Eyes and other singles.

On February 9, 2024, Barber released his first single of the year, "S.O.B." Prior to the release of the single, Barber held a fan vote on social media platform Instagram between three potential songs, which "S.O.B." ultimately won. One month later, on March 14, 2024, Barber released his second single of the year, "Streetlight"

On July 19, 2024, Barber released "Tear Us Apart" as a single from the soundtrack album, Twisters: The Album.

On August 9, 2024, Barber announced via Instagram his 25-city "Restless Mind" concert tour and the release of his next single, "Better Year". On August 23, 2024, Barber released a two-song single which contained "Better Year" and a cover of an unreleased song written by Tyler Childers, "Jersey Giant". On October 11, 2024, Barber released another single, "Thought of You". Three days later, Barber announced the release of his debut album, Restless Mind, which was released on November 1, 2024. The album contains 28 tracks, including "Streetlight", "S.O.B.", and "Straight and Narrow", as well as his three most recent singles. The album became Barber’s breakthrough onto the Billboard 200, peaking at 48.

Barber released the single "Man of the Year" on April 18, 2025, and "Home Tonight" on July 18, while announcing a forthcoming third EP. The EP, Music for the Soul, was released on August 1, and contains 7 songs including "Man of the Year" and "Home Tonight".

In April 2026, Sam Barber released his second full-length studio album in 2026 titled Broken View, adding onto the reflective and emotionally-charged music that made him famous. The songs in the album have an array of sounds ranging from simpler acoustic numbers to more complex and richly-layered productions, showcasing his progression as an artist, lyrically and musically.

The main themes explored in the album revolve around reflection and change in one's life, as well as complicated relationships. Some of the songs in "Broken View" have become very popular with listeners and critics alike because of their vulnerable lyrics and more coherent style of music compared to his previous album. The album is considered as a more polished piece of work by many people, helping cement Barber's position among emerging artists in the field.

== Discography ==
=== Studio albums ===
List of studio albums with selected details and chart positions
Title	Details	Peak chart positions						Certifications
Title	Details	US	US Country	AUS	CAN	NOR	NZ	Certifications
Restless Mind	Released: November 1, 2024; Label: Lockeland Springs and Atlantic; Formats: Digital download, streaming, CD	48	9	47	21	22	—	RIAA: Gold; MC: Platinum
Broken View	Released: April 3, 2026; Label: Atlantic; Formats: Digital download, streaming, CD	60	12	—	47	—	38	

=== Extended plays ===
List of EPs with selected details and chart positions
Title	Details	Peak chart positions		Certifications
Title	Details	US Country	AUS	Certifications
Million Eyes	Released: September 21, 2023; Label: Lockeland Springs and Atlantic; Formats: Digital download, streaming, CD	40	—	MC: Gold
Live EP 001	Released: January 5, 2024; Label: Lockeland Springs and Atlantic; Formats: Digital download, streaming	—	—	
Music for the Soul	Released: August 1, 2025; Label: Lockeland Springs and Atlantic; Formats: Digital download, streaming	—	84	
The Outlier	Released: November 6, 2026; Label: Lockeland Springs and Atlantic; Formats: Digital download, streaming	—	—	

=== Singles ===
List of singles, with selected chart positions and certifications, showing year released and album name
Title	Year	Peak chart positions										Certifications	Album / EP
Title	Year	US	US Country	US Rock	AUS	CAN	IRE	NOR	NZ	SWE	WW	Certifications	Album / EP
"Run Away High"	2021	—	—	—	—	—	—	—	—	—	—		Non-album singles
"Ramblin Man"	2022	—	—	—	—	—	—	—	—	—	—		Non-album singles
"Straight and Narrow"	2022	— (Note: "Straight and Narrow" did not enter the Billboard US Hot 100 chart, but peaked at number 14 on the Bubbling Under Hot 100 chart.)	33	13	41	53	29	—	—	—	—	RIAA: 2× Platinum; ARIA: 2× Platinum; BPI: Gold; MC: 3× Platinum; RMNZ: 2× Platinum	Million Eyes and Restless Mind
"As Time Passes"	2022	—	—	—	—	—	—	—	—	—	—		Non-album single
"Drowning"	2023	—	—	—	—	—	—	—	—	—	—		Million Eyes
"Ghost Town"	2023	—	—	—	—	—	—	—	—	—	—		Million Eyes
"Dancing in the Sky"	2023	—	—	—	—	—	—	—	—	—	—	ARIA: Gold; MC: Platinum; RMNZ: Gold	Million Eyes
"All That I Have"	2023	—	—	—	—	—	—	—	—	—	—		Million Eyes
"S.O.B."	2024	—	—	—	—	—	—	—	—	—	—		Restless Mind
"Streetlight"	2024	—	—	—	—	—	—	—	—	—	—		Restless Mind
"Tear Us Apart"	2024	—	—	—	—	—	—	—	—	—	—		Twisters: The Album
"Better Year"	2024	—	—	—	—	—	—	—	—	—	—		Restless Mind
"Jersey Giant"	2024	—	—	—	—	—	—	—	—	—	—		Restless Mind
"Thought of You"	2024	—	—	—	—	—	—	—	—	—	—		Restless Mind
"Restless Mind" (featuring Avery Anna)	2024	—	—	—	—	—	—	—	— (Note: "Restless Mind" did not enter the NZ Top 40 Singles Chart, but peaked at number 19 on the NZ Hot Singles Chart.)	—	—	MC: Gold; RMNZ: Gold	Restless Mind
"Indigo" (featuring Avery Anna)	2024	40	8	—	23	23	20	16	20	19	77	RIAA: Platinum; ARIA: 2× Platinum; BPI: Gold; MC: 2× Platinum; RMNZ: 2× Platinum	Restless Mind
"Man of the Year"	2025	—	43	—	—	86	—	—	— (Note: "Man of the Year" did not enter the NZ Top 40 Singles Chart, but peaked at number 5 on the NZ Hot Singles Chart.)	—	—		Music for the Soul
"Home Tonight"	2025	—	—	—	—	—	—	—	— (Note: "Home Tonight" did not enter the NZ Top 40 Singles Chart, but peaked at number 26 on the NZ Hot Singles Chart.)	—	—		Music for the Soul
"Music for the Soul"	2025	—	—	29	—	—	—	—	— (Note: "Music for the Soul" did not enter the NZ Top 40 Singles Chart, but peaked at number 21 on the NZ Hot Singles Chart.)	—	—		Music for the Soul
"Better than the Floor" (with Chance Pena)	2025	—	—	—	—	—	—	—	— (Note: "Better than the Floor" did not enter the NZ Top 40 Singles Chart, but peaked at number 32 on the NZ Hot Singles Chart.)	—	—		Music for the Soul
"Borrowed Time"	2026	—	47	29	—	—	—	—	—	—	—		Broken View
"Good Faith"	2026	—	—	41	—	—	—	—	—	—	—		Outlier
"—" denotes a recording that did not chart or was not released in that territory.

=== Other charted songs ===
List of other charted songs, with selected chart positions, showing year released and album name
Title	Year	Peak chart positions	Album
Title	Year	US Rock	Album
"Just a Kid"	2026	39	Broken View
"The More I Hope"	2026	32	Broken View
"Outlier"	2026	47	Outlier

== Awards and nominations ==
Year	Association	Category	Nominated work	Result	Ref.
2026	American Music Awards	Breakthrough Country Artist	Himself	Won	
2026	American Music Awards	Best Country Album	"Restless Mind"	Nominated	
