= Mint (Alice Merton album) =

Studio album by Alice Merton
- Released: 18 January 2019
- Genre: Dance-pop
- Length: 38:11
- Label: Paper Planes; Mom + Pop
- Producer: Nicolas Rebscher; John Hill; Alice Merton

Alice Merton chronology
| No Roots (2017) | Mint (2019) | S.I.D.E.S. (2022) |

Singles from Mint
- 1. "No Roots" Released: 2 December 2016; 2. "Lash Out" Released: 30 May 2018; 3. "Why So Serious" Released: 7 September 2018; 4. "Funny Business" Released: 30 November 2018

Mint is the debut studio album by German-Canadian singer Alice Merton, released on 18 January 2019 through Paper Planes and Mom + Pop Music. It includes the singles "No Roots" and "Lash Out, which were previously included on the No Roots EP, "Why So Serious", released on 7 September 2018, and "Funny Business", released on 30 November 2018.

Merton re-released the album in late 2019 under the title Mint +4, with the addition of 4 new songs, including new single "Easy".

== Background ==
Merton spoke to Billboard about an additional single to be included on the album: "It's one of my favorites at the moment. I could listen to it all the time... We'll probably be releasing it in November. When I wrote it, I was like, yeah this is fun." She also stated that the song "Why So Serious" came about as a "response to the press' questions about being a one-hit wonder [after 'No Roots'] and embracing her individuality through music and a small team".

== Promotion ==
=== Singles ===
The lead single, "No Roots" was released on 2 December 2016, which was included in her debut EP, No Roots. It reached number one on the US Alternative Songs chart. On 30 May 2018, "Lash Out" was released as the second single from the album. The third single, "Why So Serious", which was released on 7 September 2018, was accompanied by a video of Merton seeing strange things as she walks down a street. "Funny Business" was released on 30 November 2018 as the fourth and las single from the album. "Easy" was released as the overall fifth single from Mint +4.

== Critical reception ==
Mint ratings
Aggregate scores
| Source | Rating |
|---|---|
| Metacritic | 74/100 |
Review scores
| Source | Rating |
| AllMusic | 3.5/5 stars |
| Exclaim! | 7/10 |
| PopMatters | 8/10 |

The New York Times called the album a "rousing take on centrist 1980s pop with a disco tempo and the faintest texture of Southern rock. Which is to say: Haim, watch out."

== Track listing ==
All tracks were produced by Nicolas Rebscher, except "Lash Out", produced alongside Dave Bassett and "Funny Business" produced by John Hill.

Mint – Standard edition
| No. | Title | Writer(s) | Length |
|---|---|---|---|
| 1. | "Learn to Live" | Alice Merton; Nicolas Rebscher | 3:56 |
| 2. | "2 Kids" | Merton; Rebscher | 3:31 |
| 3. | "No Roots" | Merton; Rebscher | 3:55 |
| 4. | "Funny Business" | Merton; John Hill | 3:05 |
| 5. | "Homesick" | Merton; Rebscher | 3:16 |
| 6. | "Lash Out" | Merton; David Bassett | 3:14 |
| 7. | "Speak Your Mind" | Merton; Rebscher | 3:32 |
| 8. | "I Don't Hold a Grudge" | Merton; Hutchings; Rebscher | 3:39 |
| 9. | "Honeymoon Heartbreak" | Merton; Michelle Leonard; Rebscher | 3:23 |
| 10. | "Trouble in Paradise" | Merton; Rebscher; Tobias Kuhn | 2:57 |
| 11. | "Why So Serious" | Merton; Rebscher | 3:43 |
| Total length: | | | 38:11 |

Mint – +4 Edition
| No. | Title | Writer(s) | Length |
|---|---|---|---|
| 5. | "Easy" | Merton; Rebscher | 3:10 |
| 6. | "Homesick" | Merton; Rebscher | 3:16 |
| 7. | "Lash Out" | Merton; David Bassett | 3:14 |
| 8. | "Keeps Me Awake" | Merton; David Vogt; Hannes Büscher; Laila Samuels; Philip Böllhoff; Sipho Sililo | 3:11 |
| 9. | "Speak Your Mind" | Merton; Rebscher | 3:32 |
| 10. | "I Don't Hold a Grudge" | Merton; Hutchings; Rebscher | 3:39 |
| 11. | "Honeymoon Heartbreak" | Merton; Michelle Leonard; Rebscher | 3:23 |
| 12. | "PCH" | Merton; Bassett | 3:32 |
| 13. | "Trouble in Paradise" | Merton; Rebscher; Tobias Kuhn | 2:57 |
| 14. | "Why So Serious" | Merton; Rebscher | 3:43 |
| 15. | "Back to Berlin" | Merton | 4:22 |
| Total length: | | | 52:26 |

== Charts ==
Chart performance for Mint
| Chart (2019) | Peak position |
|---|---|
| Austrian Albums (Ö3 Austria) | 19 |
| German Albums (Offizielle Top 100) | 2 |
| Italian Albums (FIMI) | 62 |
| Scottish Albums (OCC) | 66 |
| Swiss Albums (Schweizer Hitparade) | 21 |
| UK Albums Sales (OCC) | 63 |
| UK Album Downloads (OCC) | 25 |
| UK Independent Albums (OCC) | 14 |
| US Top Album Sales (Billboard) | 48 |
| US Heatseekers Albums (Billboard) | 3 |
| US Independent Albums (Billboard) | 13 |
