= Primitives (album) =

Studio album by Bayonne
- Released: March 26, 2016
- Genre: Electronic
- Length: 52:42
- Label: Mom + Pop Music
- Producer: Roger Sellers

Bayonne chronology
Primitives (2016)	I Know EP (2018)

Primitives is Bayonne's debut studio album. The album was originally released by Roger Sellers on September 27, 2014 via Punctum Records. Primitives would later be re-released on March 26, 2016 via Mom + Pop Music under Bayonne, Roger Sellers' stage name.

== Reception ==
Upon its release, Primitives received generally positive reviews. At Metacritic, which assigns a normalized rating out of 100 to reviews from mainstream critics, the album holds an average score of 74 based on nine critics, indicating "generally positive reviews." MOJO magazine praised Bayonne's debut for "channelling the celestial overlaid vocals of AnCo, Toro y Moi's soaring gauzy electronic pop, the live, looping sample techniques of tUnE-yArDs and D.D. Dumbo, and even Steve Reich's shuddering, percussive experiments in repetition - with charming results." Rolling Stone calls Primitives "an unusually fascinating work."

== Track listing ==
No.	Title	Length
1.	"Intro"	6:33
2.	"Appeals"	4:01
3.	"Spectrolite"	4:43
4.	"Marim"	3:57
5.	"Waves"	6:30
6.	"Steps"	4:42
7.	"Lates"	6:25
8.	"Omar"	5:55
9.	"Hammond (Bonus Track)"	5:14
10.	"Sincere (Bonus Track)"	4:42
Total length:		52:42
