= Straight and Narrow (song) =

2022 single by Sam Barber

Single by Sam Barber

from the album Million Eyes and Restless Mind
- Released: November 30, 2022
- Genre: Country
- Length: 3:19
- Label: Lockeland Springs; Atlantic
- Songwriter: Sam Barber
- Producer: Joe Becker

Sam Barber singles chronology
"Ramblin Man" (2022)	"Straight and Narrow" (2022)	"As Time Passes" (2022)

Music video
- "Straight and Narrow" on YouTube

"Straight and Narrow" is a song by American country singer Sam Barber, first released on November 30, 2022, as the lead single from his EP Million Eyes (2023). It became his breakout hit through exposure on the video-sharing app TikTok and also appears on his debut studio album Restless Mind (2024).

== Background ==
Sam Barber wrote the song when he was 16 years old. He was trying to write music that "sounded good" to him and did not feel like the song would be important to him at the time. Although he recorded his earliest music from voice memos on his phone, he decided on a higher-quality recording for "Straight and Narrow" and recorded it with a microphone in a bedroom. In November 2022, about a year after being discovered by his managers, Barber released the song. It received little attention until April 2023, after it was used on TikTok. The song subsequently gained traction on the platform and propelled Barber to mainstream popularity.

== Composition ==
"Straight and Narrow" is an acoustic guitar-based song with lyrics about persevering through times of adversity.

== Charts ==
Chart performance for "Straight and Narrow"
Chart (2023)	Peak position
Australia (ARIA)	41
Canada (Canadian Hot 100)	53
Ireland (IRMA)	29
US Bubbling Under Hot 100 Singles (Billboard)	14
US Hot Country Songs (Billboard)	33
US Hot Rock & Alternative Songs (Billboard)	13

== Certifications ==
Region	Certification	Certified units/sales
Australia (ARIA)	2× Platinum	140,000^{‡}
Canada (Music Canada)	3× Platinum	240,000^{‡}
New Zealand (RMNZ)	2× Platinum	60,000^{‡}
United Kingdom (BPI)	Gold	400,000^{‡}
United States (RIAA)	2× Platinum	2,000,000^{‡}
^{‡} Sales+streaming figures based on certification alone.
