= Avery Anna =

American singer-songwriter

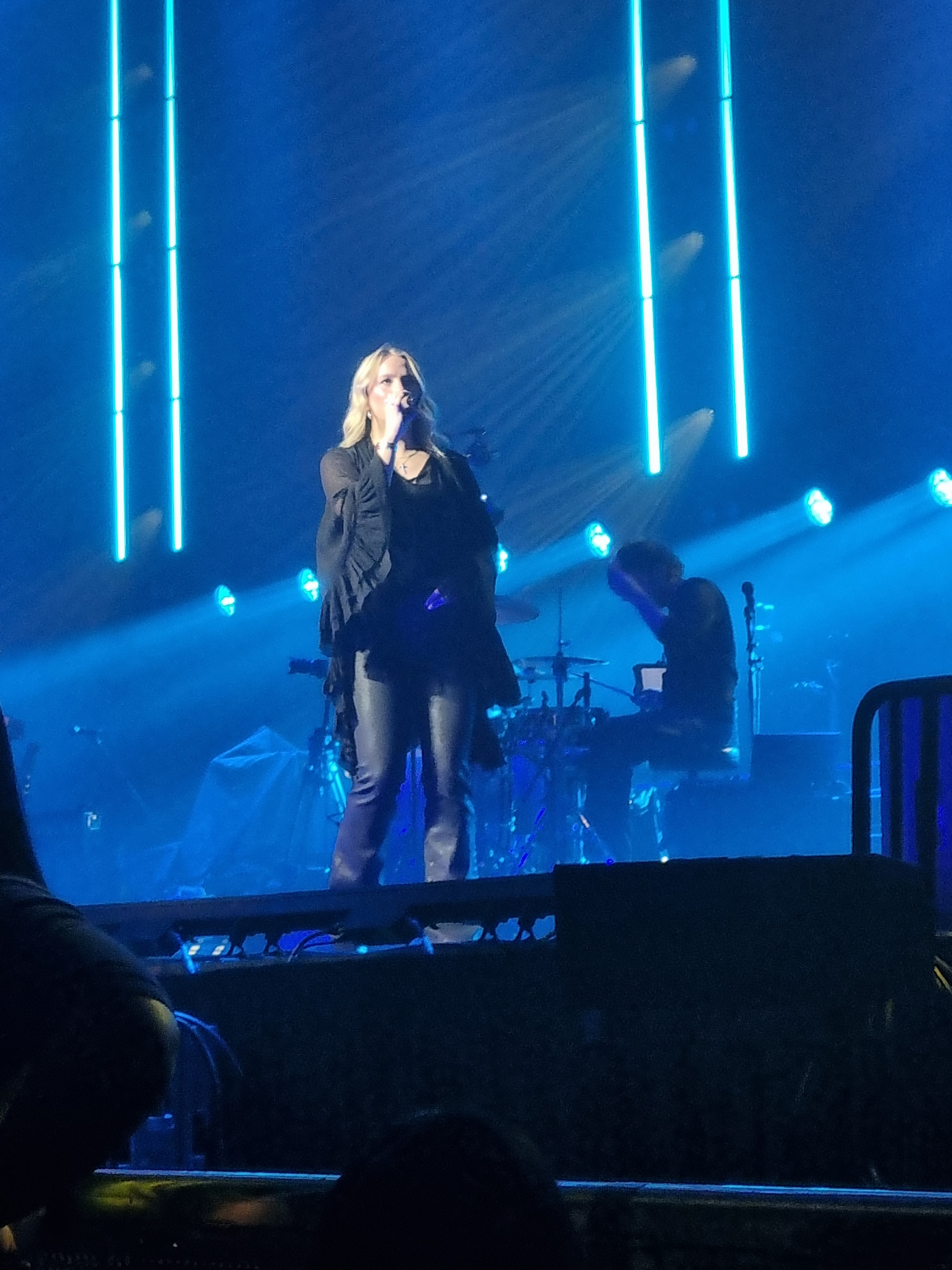
- Avery Anna in 2025 C2C: Country to Country at Glasgow

Background information
- Born: Avery Anna Rhoton; March 2, 2004 (age 22); Flagstaff, Arizona, U.S.
- Genre: Country pop
- Occupation: Singer-songwriter
- Instruments: Vocals, guitar, piano
- Years active: 2021–present
- Label: Warner Music Nashville
- Website: www.averyannamusic.com

TikTok information
- Page: avery.anna.music
- Followers: 2.3 million
- Last updated: November 18, 2026

Avery Anna Rhoton (born March 2, 2004) is an American singer-songwriter from Flagstaff, Arizona. Her music blends elements of country, rock, and acoustic pop music, and is described as confessional. She is signed to Warner Music Nashville and her talent manager is David Fanning.

She has released two albums: Breakup Over Breakfast (2024) and Let Go Letters (2025). Anna co-wrote and was featured on the song "Indigo" (2024) by Sam Barber, which reached number 8 on the Hot Country Songs chart, number 40 on the Billboard Hot 100, number 33 on the UK singles chart, and charted in several other European countries. She is featured on the song "Dusty Bibles" with Josiah Queen, which peaked at number 3 on the Hot Christian Songs list.

== Early life ==
Avery Anna Rhoton grew up in Flagstaff, Arizona. When she was 8 years old, after she was baptized, she received a journal as a gift, which later became the inspiration for her songs. She started singing in church as a little girl; her mother told her it was to help people get closer to God. She wrote her first song around the fifth grade and soon taught herself to play guitar. She also sang country songs by Johnny Cash, Willie Nelson, and Merle Haggard with her grandfather, who played guitar. Prior to her music career, volleyball was her primary focus, with her mother serving as a coach.

== Career ==
=== Early career (2021–2023) ===
During the COVID-19 pandemic, she posted her cover version of "Say Something" by Christina Aguilera on TikTok in late 2020, which became a viral video. She sang in her mother's bathtub because of the good acoustics. The video gained the attention of Matt Thomas of Parmalee, who forwarded it to David Fanning of 33 Creative. Fanning contacted Anna via Instagram and signed her to a talent manager and song production agreement. Along with Andy Sheridan and Ben Williams, Fanning wrote the song "Narcissist", inspired by Anna's journal entries, which she recorded. It was performed by Kelly Clarkson on The Kelly Clarkson Show.

She released her debut single, "Just Cause I Love You," in early 2021 with her breakout Platinum-certified song "Narcissist" arriving later that year. In August 2021, she moved to Nashville at the age of 17. Upon relocation, Anna would go on tour for the first time opening for Josh Turner and Martina McBride. In May 2022, Anna graduated from Coconino High School, completing her final year via Zoom. In June 2022, Anna signed a recording contract with Warner Music Nashville. "Narcissist" peaked at No. 22 on Billboard's Hot Country Songs chart. Anna made her Grand Ole Opry debut on September 30, 2022. In October 2022, she released her debut extended play, Mood Swings, made up of songs that are inspired by moments in her life where she felt either really happy, in love, confused, or sad.

In 2023, she attended the CMT Music Awards, earning a nomination for Breakthrough Female Video of the Year and performed on the Ram Trucks Side Stage. Anna would also embark on her first headlining tours "The Narcissist Tour" and the "Treat Yourself Nice Tour" while opening for the likes of Jordan Davis, Cole Swindell, and Chase Rice.

=== Breakup Over Breakfast, "Indigo", & Let Go Letters (2024–2025) ===
In July 2024, her debut album, Breakup Over Breakfast, was released via Warner Music Nashville. She co-wrote all 17 of the album's songs, which features collaborations with Parmalee, Dylan Marlowe, Hillary Lindsey, Liz Rose, and Lori McKenna (known collectively as the Love Junkies).

In October 2024, Sam Barber released "Indigo" and "Restless Mind" from his debut album Restless Mind which features and was co-written with Anna. "Indigo" was a chart hit, peaking at number 40 on the Billboard Hot 100, number 8 on the Hot Country Songs chart, number 33 on the UK singles chart, and charted in several other European countries. It impacted country radio on February 24, 2025. Anna also collaborated with Adrien Nunez on breakout single "Low Road."

In May 2025, her second album, Let Go Letters, was released. Songs were inspired by fans; at Anna's concerts, fans would write down their struggles in letters as a way to process and let go - each song on her album is based on one of these letters. That same year, she was named alongside the Opry NextStage Class of 2025.

=== forgive, forget. (2026–present) ===
In early 2026, she announced the Girl of Constant Sorrow tour, inspired by the Joan Baez song. On March 13, 2026, she released the EP forgive, forget.. The project includes Sam Barber duet "Fear In God" and "Blood Runs Thicker," which served as her official debut single at country radio on July 27. Her momentum earned her the win for New Female Artist of the Year at the 61st Academy of Country Music Awards, a Female Artist of the Year nomination at the 2026 MusicRow Awards, and her first Country Music Association Award nomination for New Artist of the Year at the 60th Annual CMA Awards. Following a viral performance at the ACM Awards, she embarked on the headlining Blood Runs Thicker Tour in the fall of 2026. Anna collaborated with Dexter and the Moonrocks on "Why Don't You Say So", which debuted at No. 98 on the Billboard Hot 100, her second chart entry.

== Personal life ==
Anna is Christian.

== Discography ==
=== Studio albums ===
List of albums, with selected details
| Title | Album details |
|---|---|
| Breakup Over Breakfast | Release date: July 19, 2024; Label: Warner Music Nashville; Format: CD, digital download, LP, streaming |
| Let Go Letters | Release date: May 16, 2025; Label: Warner Music Nashville; Format: CD, digital download, LP, streaming |

=== Extended plays ===
List of extended plays with selected details
| Title | Details |
|---|---|
| Mood Swings | Released: October 7, 2022; Label: Warner Music Nashville; Formats: Digital download, streaming |
| Forgive, Forget | Released: March 13, 2026; Label: Warner Music Nashville; Formats: Digital download, streaming |

=== Singles ===
==== As lead artist ====
List of singles
| Title | Year | Peak chart positions | | | | | | | | Certifications | Album |
| Title | Year | US | US Rock | US Christ. | US Christ. Air | US Christ. AC | US Christ. Digital | US Christ. Stream. | US Country | Certifications | Album |
|---|---|---|---|---|---|---|---|---|---|---|---|
| "Just Cause I Love You" | 2021 | — | — | — | — | — | — | — | — | | Non-album singles |
| "Can't Miss You Anymore" | 2021 | — | — | — | — | — | — | — | — | | Non-album singles |
| "I Love You More" | 2021 | — | — | — | — | — | — | — | — | | Non-album singles |
| "Narcissist" | 2021 | — (Note: "Narcissist" did not enter the Billboard Hot 100, but peaked at number 4 on the Bubbling Under Hot 100.) | — | — | — | — | — | — | 22 | RIAA: Platinum | Mood Swings |
| "Critic" | 2022 | — | — | — | — | — | — | — | — | | Mood Swings |
| "What Made You Think?" | 2022 | — | — | — | — | — | — | — | — | | Mood Swings |
| "Miss You at Christmas" | 2022 | — | — | — | — | — | — | — | — | | Non-album singles |
| "Self Love" | 2023 | — | — | — | — | — | — | — | — | | Non-album singles |
| "Worst in Me" | 2023 | — | — | — | — | — | — | — | — | | Non-album singles |
| "I Will (When You Do)" (featuring Dylan Marlowe) | 2023 | — | — | — | — | — | — | — | — | | Non-album singles |
| "Make It Look Easy" | 2024 | — | — | — | — | — | — | — | — | | Breakup Over Breakfast |
| "Two Sides of the Story" | 2024 | — | — | — | — | — | — | — | — | | Breakup Over Breakfast |
| "Blonde" | 2024 | — | — | — | — | — | — | — | — | | Breakup Over Breakfast |
| "Breakup Over Breakfast" | 2024 | — | — | — | — | — | — | — | — | | Breakup Over Breakfast |
| "Say Something" | 2024 | — | — | — | — | — | — | — | — | | Spotify Sessions |
| "Girl Next Door" | 2024 | — | — | — | — | — | — | — | — | | Breakup Over Breakfast |
| "Low Road" (with Adrien Nunez) | 2025 | — | — | — | — | — | — | — | — | | Non-album single |
| "Mr. Predictable" | 2025 | — | — | — | — | — | — | — | — | | Let Go Letters |
| "Wish You Well" | 2025 | — | — | — | — | — | — | — | — | | Let Go Letters |
| "Danny Don't" | 2025 | — | — | — | — | — | — | — | — | | Let Go Letters |
| "Dusty Bibles" (with Josiah Queen) | 2025 | 92 | 14 | 3 | 18 | 19 | 4 | 3 | — | | Non-album single |
| "Fear in God" (with Sam Barber) | 2026 | — | — | — | — | — | — | — | — | | Forgive, Forget |
| "Man Downstairs" | 2026 | — | — | — | — | — | — | — | — | | Forgive, Forget |
| "Blood Runs Thicker" | 2026 | — | — | — | — | — | — | — | 47 | | Forgive, Forget |

=== As featured artist ===
| Title | Year | Peak chart positions | | | | | | | | | | Certifications | Album |
| Title | Year | US | US Country | US Rock | AUS | CAN | IRE | NOR | NZ | SWE | WW | Certifications | Album |
|---|---|---|---|---|---|---|---|---|---|---|---|---|---|
| "Restless Mind" (Sam Barber featuring Avery Anna) | 2024 | — | — | — | — | — | — | — | — (Note: "Restless Mind" did not enter the NZ Top 40 Singles Chart, but peaked at number 19 on the NZ Hot Singles Chart.) | — | — | MC: Gold | Restless Mind |
| "Indigo" (Sam Barber featuring Avery Anna) | 2024 | 40 | 8 | — | 23 | 23 | 20 | 16 | 20 | 19 | 77 | RIAA: Platinum; ARIA: 2× Platinum; BPI: Gold; MC: 2× Platinum; RMNZ: 2× Platinum | Restless Mind |
| "Why Don't You Say So" (Dexter and the Moonrocks featuring Avery Anna) | 2026 | 98 | — | 23 | — | 88 | — | — | — (Note: "Why Don't You Say So" did not enter the NZ Top 40 Singles Chart, but peaked at number 10 on the NZ Hot Singles Chart.) | — | — | | Friends That I Don't Like |
"—" denotes a recording that did not chart or was not released in that territory.

== Awards and nominations ==
| Year | Association | Category | Nominated work | Result | Ref. |
|---|---|---|---|---|---|
| 2023 | CMT Music Awards | Breakthrough Female Video of the Year | Herself | Nominated | |
| 2026 | Academy of Country Music Awards | New Female Artist of the Year | Herself | Won | |
| 2026 | Country Music Association Awards | New Artist of the Year | Herself | Pending | |

== Tours ==
=== Headlining ===
- "The Narcissist Tour" (2023)
- "Treat Yourself Nice Tour" (2023)
- "Let Go Letters Tour" (2025)
- "Girl of Constant Sorrow Tour" (2026)
- Blood Runs Thicker Tour (2026)

=== Opening act ===
- Josh Turner and Martina McBride (2022)
- The Western Tour (Spencer Crandall) (2022)
- Damn Good Time Tour (Jordan Davis) (2023)
- Twelve Tour (Cole Swindell) (2023)
- Way Down Yonder Tour (Chase Rice) (2023)
- The Extra Mile Tour (Breland) (2023)
- Fell In Love With A Cowgirl Tour (Parmalee) (2025)
- Restless Mind Tour (Sam Barber) (2025)
- Country Song Came On Tour (Luke Bryan) (2025)
- Truck Still Works World Tour (Brad Paisley) (2025)
- Ain't Enough Road Tour (Jordan Davis) (2026)
- Dandelion Tour (Ella Langley) (2026)
- The Ugly Tour (Teddy Swims) (2026)
- Grateful Tour (The Red Clay Strays) (2027)
- My Kinda Saturday Night Tour (Luke Combs) (2027)
