= Alice Merton =

German-Canadian singer-songwriter (born 1993)

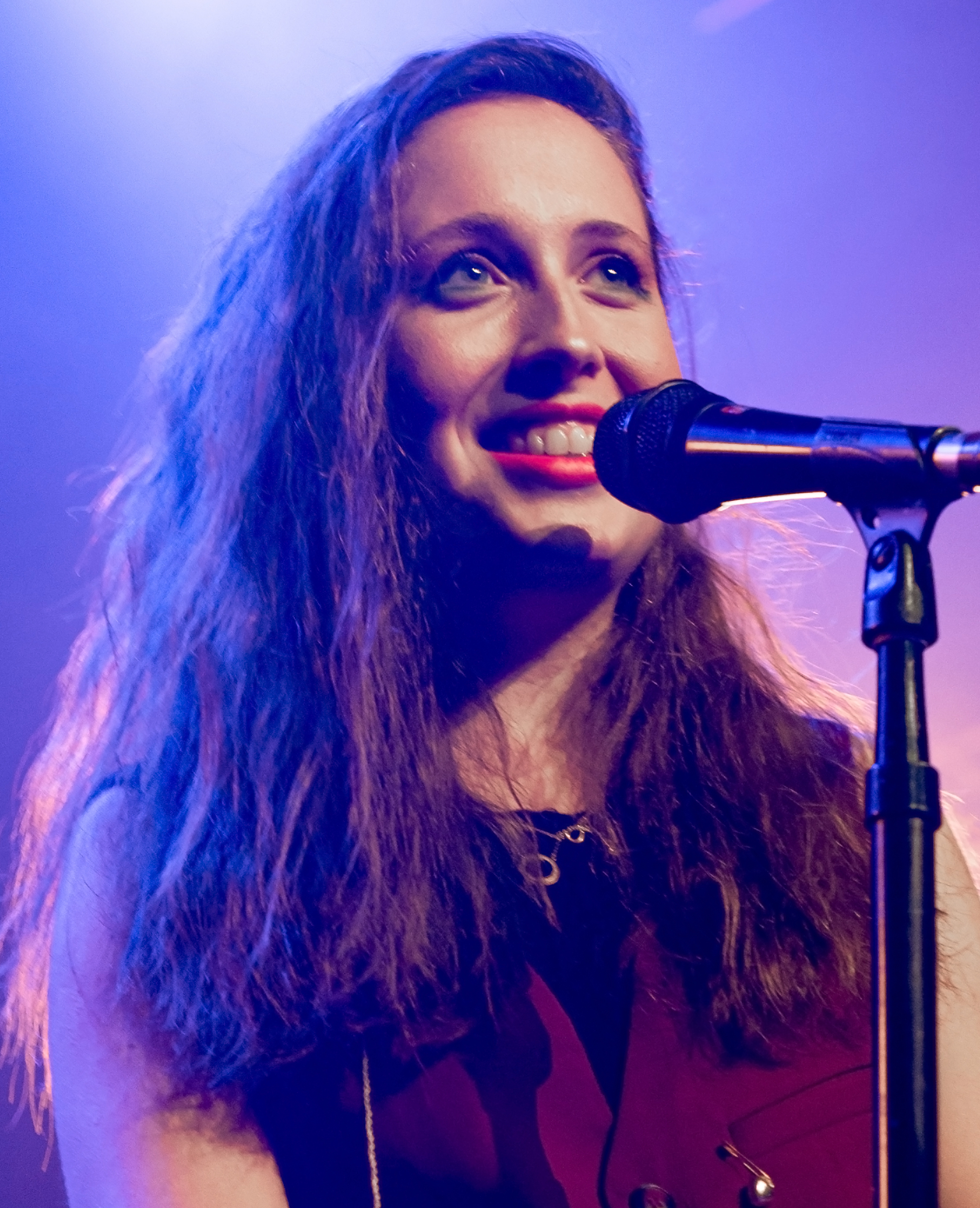
- Merton in 2024
- Born: 13 September 1993 (age 32); Frankfurt, Germany
- Education: Popakademie Baden-Württemberg
- Occupations: Singer; songwriter
- Musical career
- Origin: Frankfurt, Germany
- Instruments: Vocals; piano; guitar
- Years active: 2015–present
- Labels: Paper Plane; Mom + Pop
- Website: alicemerton.com

Alice Florence Clarissa Merton (born 13 September 1993) is a British-based German-Canadian singer-songwriter. Merton achieved mainstream success with her debut single, "No Roots". In 2017, she released her first EP of the same name, and released her debut studio album Mint in 2019. S.I.D.E.S. was released as her second studio album in 2022. Her third studio album, Visions, was released on 16 January 2026.

== Early life ==
Alice Florence Clarissa Merton was born on 13 September 1993 in Frankfurt, Germany to a German mother and an Irish-born father. Merton's family moved frequently due to her father's job as a mining consultant. When she was three months old, Merton moved to Connecticut. Shortly thereafter, they relocated to Oakville, Ontario, Canada where she was raised until the age of thirteen, learning classical piano and singing. Her family then relocated to Munich. Merton's return to Germany prompted her to learn German which enabled her to speak with her German grandmother whom she had only seen annually growing up. While in Germany, Merton wrote her first song and attended a German-language high school before graduating and moving to the United Kingdom.

Merton moved frequently in her early life, living in Oakville, Ontario, Connecticut, New York, Munich, Bournemouth, London, and Berlin, among other places. Through her upbringing, Merton has stated she has felt connected to Canada, the United Kingdom, Germany, and France where her mother lived. In 2013, she started her studies at the Popakademie Baden-Württemberg in Mannheim, where she earned a bachelor's degree in composition and song writing, and met the members of her future band.

== Career ==
=== 2015–2017: The Book of Nature, No Roots, and mainstream success ===
Merton first drew major attention in 2015 as a songwriter and singer on Fahrenhaidt's album The Book of Nature. On 14 November 2016 while in Hamburg, she won the annual award for the promotion of talented newcomers in the category Acoustic Pop.

After moving to Berlin, Merton and her manager Paul Grauwinkel founded the record label Paper Plane Records International, and released the song "No Roots" at the end of 2016. The song's lyrics were inspired by her feeling of "There's no one place where my home is." On both Hype Machine and Spotify's Global Viral 50 charts the song reached number one, and was soon included on the "Hit Play" lists of several radio stations. The song was also featured on episode 5x09 of the NBC TV series, The Blacklist.

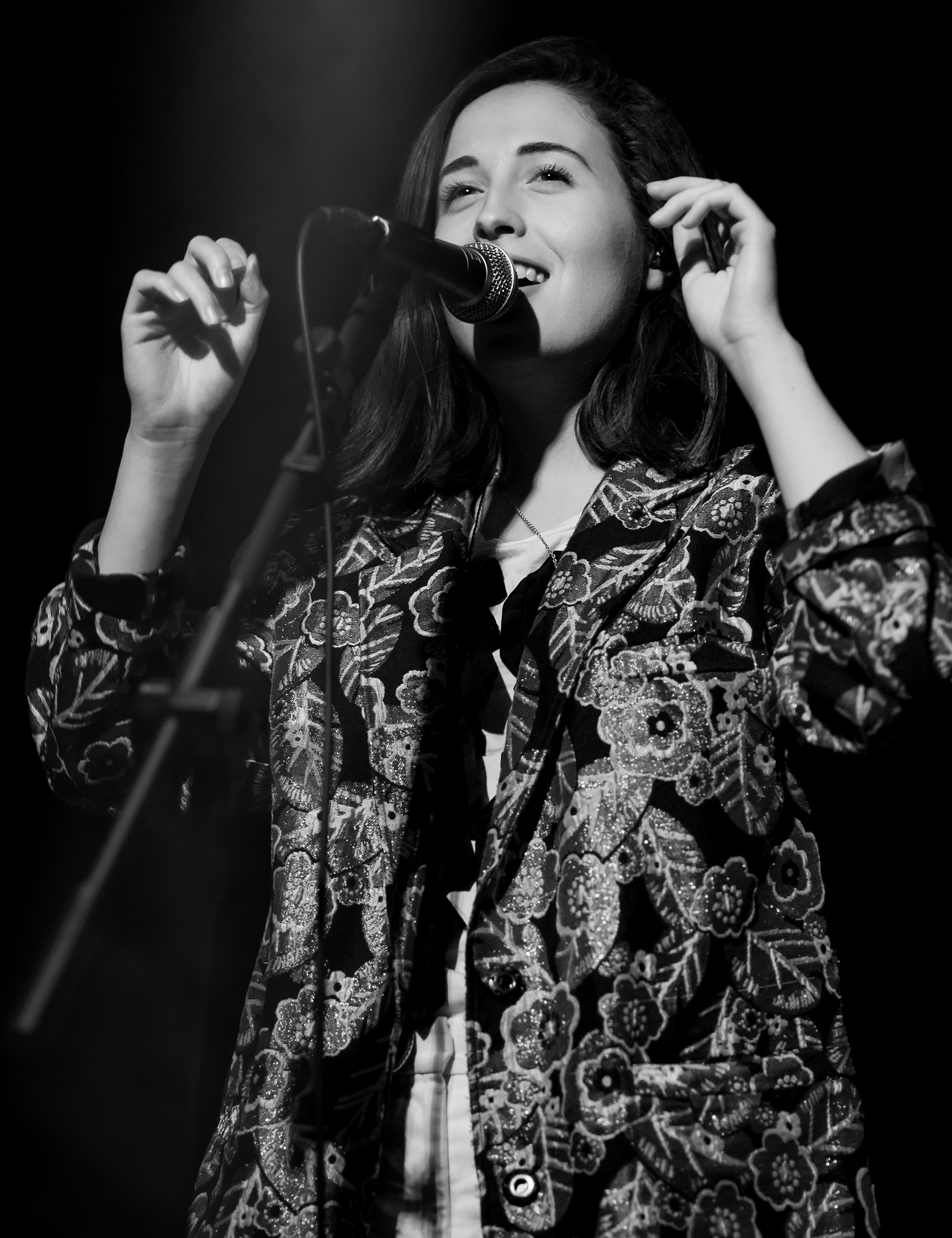
Alice performing live in Los Angeles 2017

On the basis of this success, Merton officially released her first EP, No Roots, on 3 February 2017. The song "No Roots" reached number two on the German charts, number three in Austria, and number one in US alternative radio charts. Vodafone Germany also included the song in one of its commercials. Merton signed with Mom + Pop Music in August 2017 for marketing within the United States, and on 2 August 2017 she released her second single "Hit the Ground Running" with her new record label.

She performed at the Life Ball in Vienna on 10 June 2017, and ended the year touring throughout Germany, appearing as opening act for Bosse and Philipp Poisel, among others. In late 2017 she won the 2018 European Border Breakers Award.

=== 2018–2020: Mint ===
On 7 September 2018, Merton released "Why So Serious", as the second single from her debut album, Mint. It was released on 18 November 2019. The third single, "Funny Business" was released 30 November. The video for the single was premiered 9 January, releasing her brand new song from the album "Homesick".

Merton dueted with British singer-songwriter Tom Odell in the single "Half as Good as You", released on 28 September 2018. On 1 February 2019, Merton released the first part of the Making of Mint documentary and announced an April 2019 USA concert tour.

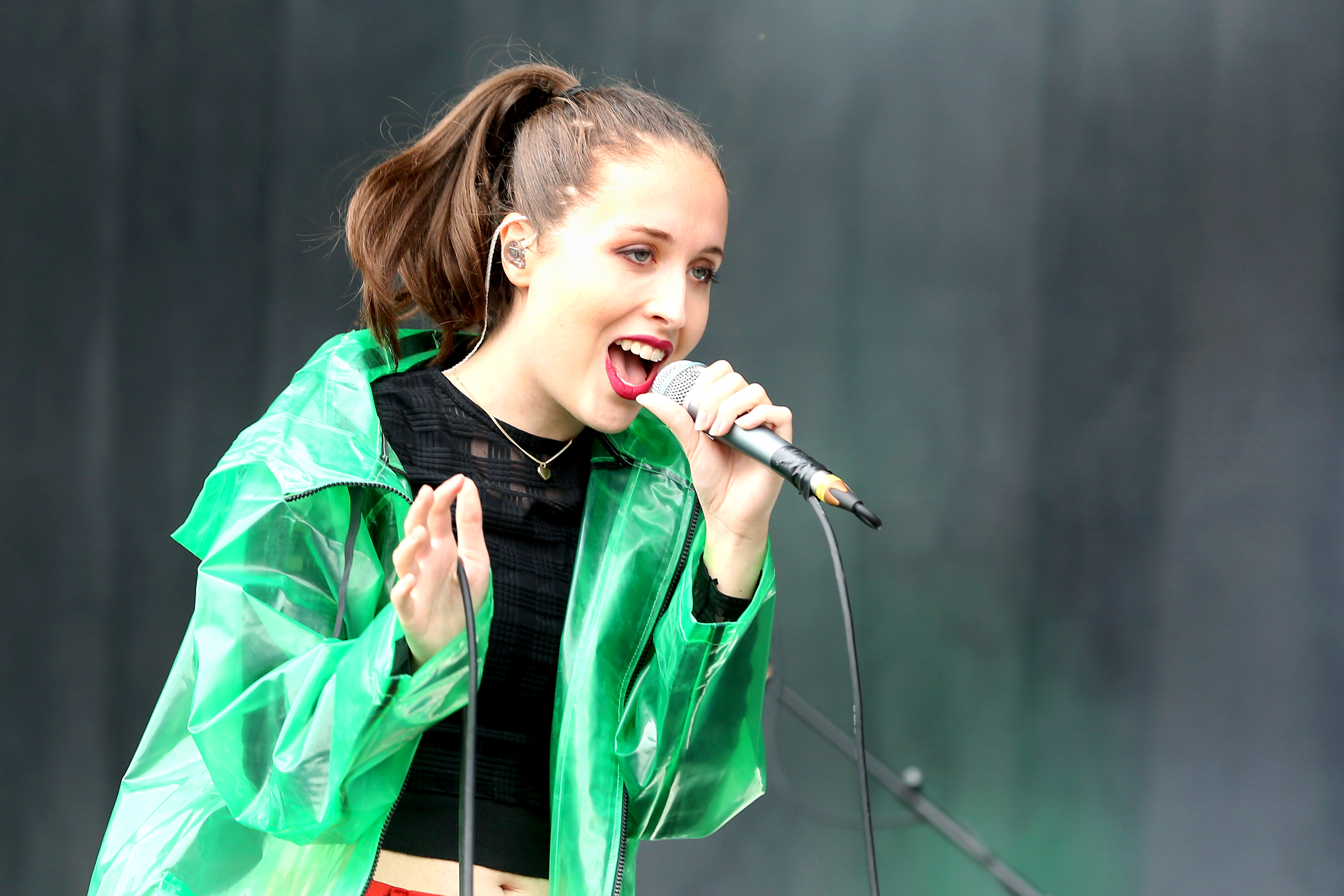
Alice Merton live at Southside Festival 2019

In 2019, Merton was a coach on ninth series of The Voice of Germany, becoming the first female coach to win a series. In Claudia Emmanuela Santoso, her victory is marked as the third international contestant to win. On 18 October 2019, Merton released her album Mint again with four additional songs: "Back to Berlin", "PCH", "Easy" and "Keeps Me Awake". Later, in the beginning of 2020, she toured across Germany, Austria, Czech Republic and Denmark singing these new songs, as well as the ones from her previous album.

=== 2021–2022: S.I.D.E.S ===
On 8 April 2021, Merton released "Vertigo". On 9 September, she released double single, "Hero" and "Island", both of which are from her upcoming second studio album, S.I.D.E.S., which she revealed the name on 23 February 2022, along with its tracklist. Her new work will count with 15 tracks, of which 6 have already been released. On TikTok, she released a video announcing the release of the next song "Same Team" would be on 4 March 2022. Later in April 2022, she released her next single "Blindside", and lastly "Love Back" in May 2022.

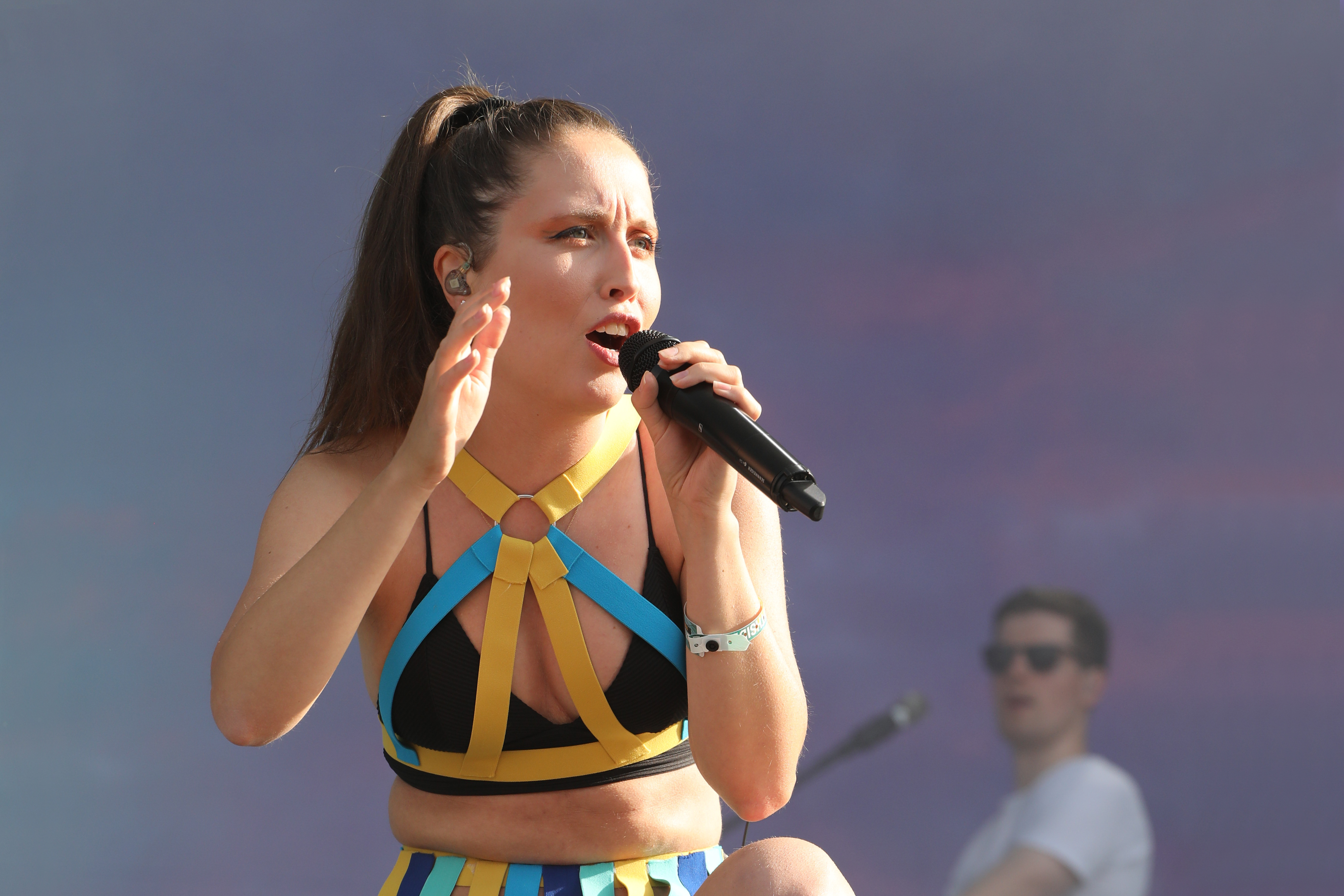
Merton at Southside Festival in 2022

She was touring with the British band Bastille in their Give Me the Future American tour. Later in 2022, she performed in 7 different countries through all Europe, in support of her second album, S.I.D.E.S. On 17 June, S.I.D.E.S. was released.

=== 2024–present: Heron EP & Visions ===
On 1 January 2024, Merton released the first single "Run Away Girl" from her second EP, Heron, released on 12 April 2024. The original version of the EP contained 5 songs. On 16 August 2024, she added different versions and the instrumentals on the deluxe version, titled Heron II. In May 2024, Merton performed a headline tour in the United States of America. On 25 September 2025, she released the lead single "Ignorance Is Bliss" and announced her forthcoming third studio album, Visions, which is due on 16 January 2026. The song "Ignorance Is Bliss" has been written by Merton and Dan Smith in Iceland. Later in the process, Jennifer Decilveo and Paul Whalley contributed further creative work to the song.

== Personal life ==
Merton currently resides in London. Merton is a great-great-grandniece of Wilhelm Merton.

== Discography ==
=== Studio albums ===
- Mint (2019)
- S.I.D.E.S. (2022)
- Visions (2026)
