= No Roots (song) =

Single by Alice Merton

from the EP No Roots and the album Mint
- Released: 2 December 2016
- Genre: Synth-pop
- Length: 3:55
- Label: Paper Plane; Mom + Pop
- Songwriters: Alice Merton; Nicolas Rebscher
- Producer: Nicolas Rebscher

Alice Merton singles chronology
"No Roots" (2016)	"Hit the Ground Running" (2017)

Music video
- "No Roots" on YouTube

"No Roots" is the debut single by the German-British-Canadian singer and songwriter Alice Merton. Merton co-wrote the song with producer Nicolas Rebscher. The song was released in Europe through Paper Plane Records on December 2nd, 2016 and in the United States by Mom + Pop Music on 2 February 2018.

The song reached the top 10 of the music charts in Germany, Italy, Austria, France, Luxembourg, Poland, Slovenia, and Israel, and it also reached the top 20 in Switzerland. It also peaked at number 84 on the US Billboard Hot 100. The song was certified Gold in the United States by the (RIAA), Platinum in Germany by the (BVMI), and in France by the (SNEP). It was added to the 'A' List of the digital UK station Radio X in March 2018 and was also receiving airplay on BBC Radio 1 and the UK's most popular station BBC Radio 2.

== Writing ==
After moving from Canada to Germany, Merton wrote her first song, "Little Lighthouse", a song "about finding my way back home", she told Billboard. Moving a total of 12 times in 24 years inspired her to write the song. "No Roots" came together while she was visiting her parents in England. "I got to a point where I was feeling quite lost. So I decided to write a song that would make me feel better", she explained.

== Release and promotion ==
The original release date of the single, "No Roots" was scheduled for 18 November 2016 but was delayed until 2 December 2016. In the UK, Merton was part of the BBC Introducing radio programme on 18 March 2017. She appeared on television, at prime time in the ProSieben show, Schlag den Henssler. On 9 February 2018, she also appeared for the first time on The Tonight Show Starring Jimmy Fallon performing "No Roots". Later, Merton featured on the Viva Top 100 and VIVA elevator music. Beginning in May 2017, "No Roots" is used as the soundtrack for an official commercial of Vodafone Germany. On 12 April 2018, Merton performed the song live during the German Echo Music Prize.

== Critical reception ==
Mike Jones of WWDC (FM) exclaimed that "No Roots" is "the start of greatness". The song received a similar reception on WGN-TV, with WGN Music Producer Tom Barnas claiming that Merton "slayed it". Hype Machine and music blogs positively received Merton's single, "No Roots". According to Nielsen Music, in the United States, the song had been streamed 922,000 times as of August 2017. Eleanor Pettipher of Fortitude Magazine wrote that "track is kept fresh and catchy by the undulating baseline [sic] and backing vocal emphasis on 'roots'". Front View Magazine remarks that with success, the song "seems to sum up the life of the English/German singer". Matthew Kent of The Line of Best Fit remarks that the song is "brought together perfectly by the powerful, repeating refrain". Indie Obsessive stated that "No Roots" is "the most recent humility check. The song was released months ago. It was interesting, but not blogworthy. Over time, the attraction to the song grew".

=== Year-end lists ===
Billboard magazine named "No Roots" the 81st best song of 2017.

== Usage in other media ==
"No Roots" was featured in a Mini car commercial in 2018, as well as the fifth season of the television series The Blacklist. It was also used by dancers in Dancing on Ice, a British TV show, and in week 2 of the U.K. show Strictly Come Dancing in 2018 where Kate Silverton and Aljaz Skorjanec danced a tango to it. In the Brazilian soap opera Segundo Sol and during several Sunday Night Football games on NBC during the 2018 regular season, the song was also featured. An instrumental version of the song was used in a series of 2019 and 2020 Miracle-Gro advertisements that aired in the US.

It was also used in American television series Deception, and was performed by Australian band 5 Seconds of Summer at the BBC Live Lounge. On May 2021, the song started to go viral on TikTok, appearing in 1 million videos. In 2022, the song was featured in the Polish Netflix film Heart Parade. In 2025, the song was used in the South African/Scottish television series Recipes for Love and Murder.

== Charts ==
=== Weekly charts ===
2017–2018 weekly chart performance for "No Roots"
Chart (2017–2018)	Peak position
Austria (Ö3 Austria Top 40)	3
Belarus Airplay (Eurofest)	2
Belgium (Ultratip Bubbling Under Flanders)	5
Belgium (Ultratip Bubbling Under Wallonia)	7
Canada Hot 100 (Billboard)	97
Canada AC (Billboard)	36
Canada CHR/Top 40 (Billboard)	44
Canada Hot AC (Billboard)	20
Canada Rock (Billboard)	3
Croatia International Airplay (Top lista)	8
Czech Republic (IFPI)	52
France (SNEP)	41
Germany (GfK)	2
Hungary (Editors' Choice Top 40)	22
Hungary (Single Top 40)	25
Iceland (Tónlistinn)	1
Italy (FIMI)	7
Italy Airplay (EarOne)	1
Mexico Airplay (Billboard)	43
Poland Airplay (ZPAV)	9
Romania (Airplay 100)	95
Russia Airplay (Tophit)	4
Scottish Singles Sales (Official Charts)	20
Slovakia (IFPI)	5
Slovenia (SloTop50)	3
Switzerland (Schweizer Hitparade)	12
UK Singles (Official Charts)	52
Ukraine Airplay (TopHit)	1
US Billboard Hot 100	84
US Adult Pop Airplay (Billboard)	13
US Hot Rock & Alternative Songs (Billboard)	5
US Pop Airplay (Billboard)	27
US Rock & Alternative Airplay (Billboard)	1

2024 weekly chart performance for "No Roots"
Chart (2024)	Peak position
Moldova Airplay (TopHit)	85

2025 weekly chart performance for "No Roots"
Chart (2025)	Peak position
Moldova Airplay (TopHit)	58

=== Monthly charts ===
2025 monthly chart performance for "No Roots"
Chart (2025)	Peak position
Moldova Airplay (TopHit)	66

=== Year-end charts ===
2017 year-end chart performance for "No Roots"
Chart (2017)	Position
Austria (Ö3 Austria Top 40)	12
France (SNEP)	168
Germany (Official German Charts)	14
Poland (ZPAV)	76
Slovenia (SloTop50)	14
Switzerland (Schweizer Hitparade)	38

2018 year-end chart performance for "No Roots"
Chart (2018)	Position
CIS (Tophit)	22
Iceland (Plötutíóindi)	46
Italy (FIMI)	35
Russia (Tophit)	24
Slovenia (SloTop50)	31
US Adult Top 40 (Billboard)	35
US Hot Rock Songs (Billboard)	11
US Rock Airplay (Billboard)	10

=== All-time charts ===
All-time chart performance for "No Roots"
Chart (1995–2021)	Position
US Adult Alternative Airplay (Billboard)	54

== Certifications ==
"No Roots" certifications
Region	Certification	Certified units/sales
Austria (IFPI Austria)	Platinum	30,000^{‡}
France (SNEP)	Platinum	133,333^{‡}
Germany (BVMI)	2× Platinum	800,000^{‡}
Italy (FIMI)	2× Platinum	100,000^{‡}
New Zealand (RMNZ)	Gold	15,000^{‡}
Poland (ZPAV)	Platinum	20,000^{‡}
Switzerland (IFPI Switzerland)	Platinum	30,000^{‡}
United Kingdom (BPI)	Silver	200,000^{‡}
United States (RIAA)	Gold	500,000^{‡}
^{‡} Sales+streaming figures based on certification alone.
