= Mom + Pop Music =

American independent record label

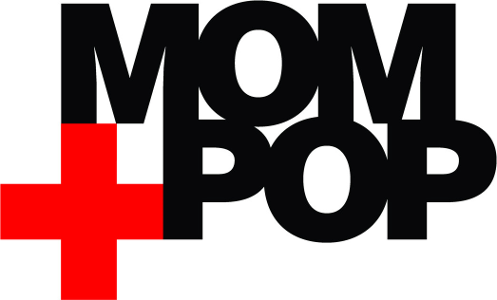
- Founded: 2008
- Founder: Michael Goldstone; Cliff Burnstein; Peter Mensch
- Distributor: Virgin Music Group
- Genre: Indie rock; alternative rock; electronic
- Country of origin: United States
- Location: New York City
- Official website: momandpopmusic.com

Mom + Pop Music is an independent record label based in New York City. The label was founded in 2008 by Michael Goldstone and has released music in indie rock, alternative, and electronic music. The label is led by co-presidents Goldstone and Thaddeus Rudd, who joined the company in 2009. Artists associated with the label have included Courtney Barnett, Magdalena Bay, Madeon, Tom Morello, Porter Robinson, Maya Hawke, Tycho, Tash Sultana, Sunflower Bean, Beach Bunny, Caamp, Del Water Gap, and Lily Fitts.

== History ==
Mom + Pop was founded by Michael Goldstone in 2008, with initial backing from Q Prime founders Peter Mensch and Cliff Burnstein. The label first operated from an office in Times Square, across from the Brill Building. In 2013, it moved its New York City office to Manhattan's NoMad district, and later added a Los Angeles office. Mom + Pop employs around 15 staff members across its New York City and Los Angeles locations, in roles including A&R, digital marketing, and design.

The label's first two signings were An Horse and Joshua Radin. Subsequent signings have included Tokyo Police Club, Freelance Whales, Sleigh Bells, Metric, Ingrid Michaelson, Andrew Bird, Lucius, FIDLAR, Poliça, Neon Indian, Jagwar Ma, Jai Wolf, Alina Baraz, Sunflower Bean, and Flume, among others. Mom and Pop signed Courtney Barnett in 2014, prior to her nomination for Best New Artist at the 2016 Grammy Awards. In 2017, the label signed Alice Merton following the performance of her single 'No Roots' on the German radio and music charts.

In June 2020, Billboard included Goldstone and Rudd in its annual "Indie Power Players" list, which recognizes executives for their work within the independent music sector.

== Artists ==
=== Current Artists ===
- After
- Alan Palomo / Neon Indian
- Alice Merton
- Caamp
- Camille Blackman
- Chaparelle
- Courtney Barnett
- Del Water Gap
- FKJ
- Galdive
- Gallant
- Indy
- Jai Wolf
- Lily Fitts
- Madeon
- Magdalena Bay
- Maya Hawke
- MGMT
- Mother Soki
- Odie Leigh
- Orion Sun
- Pablopablo
- Porter Robinson
- Sleigh Bells
- Teen Jesus and the Jean Teasers
- The Brudi Brothers
- The Kilans
- The Rat Utopia Experiment
- Tiny Habits
- Tom Morello
- Tycho
- Underscores
- Vandelux
- VIOLENT VIRA

=== Former Artists ===
- Alina Baraz
- An Horse
- Andrew Bird
- Animal Kingdom
- Ashe
- Bayonne
- Beach Bunny
- Cloud Nothings (with Carpark Records)
- DMA's
- EL EL
- Evann McIntosh
- Fidlar
- Flume
- Freelance Whales
- Goth Babe
- Hinds
- Hotel Garuda
- Hunters
- Ingrid Michaelson
- Jagwar Ma
- The Jezabels
- Jon Spencer Blues Explosion
- Joshua Radin
- Kindness
- Lady Lamb
- Lucius
- Metric
- Mikhael Paskalev
- MNDR
- Poliça
- Raffaella
- Sleater-Kinney
- Sleeper Agent
- Sleigh Bells
- Smith Westerns
- Tei Shi
- Tired Pony
- Tokyo Police Club
- White Sea
- Wild Cub
- Wavves

== See also ==
- List of record labels
