= Jagwar Ma =

Australian psychedelic dance band

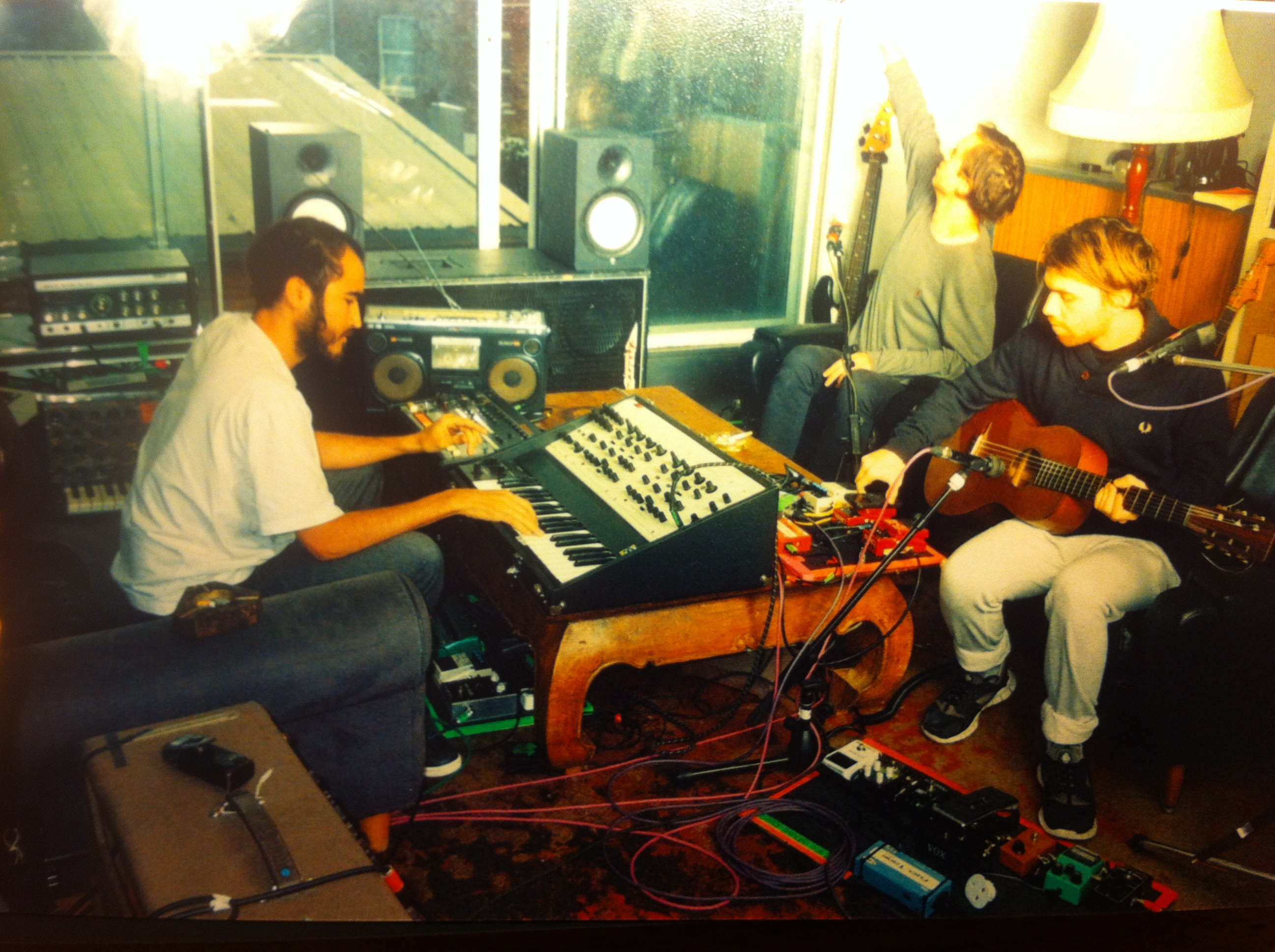
- 2013

Background information
- Origin: Sydney, Australia
- Genres: Psychedelic rock, acid house, baggy, experimental, alternative dance, trip hop
- Years active: 2011–present
- Labels: Future Classic; Mom + Pop Music; Marathon Artists
- Members: Gabriel Winterfield; Jono Ma; Jack Freeman
- Website: www.jagwarma.com

Jagwar Ma is an Australian psychedelic dance band formed in Sydney in 2011. It consists of Gabriel Winterfield (lead vocalist, guitarist), Jono Ma (guitar, beats, synths, production), and bass guitarist Jack Freeman, who joined in 2012. The band name is derived from a satirical compound of the word "jaguar" and Jono's surname. In 2013, Jagwar Ma signed with record labels Mom+Pop (US), Marathon Artists (EU), and Future Classic (Australia) and released its debut album Howlin'. It released its second album Every Now and Then on 14 October 2016.

== Career ==
Ma and Winterfield met in 2007. At this time, both were playing in different groups, Lost Valentinos and Ghostwood. It would be until mid-2010 at an FLRL performance that the two shared the stage. FLRL was a locally based krautrock experimental pop group - initially founded by Jono Ma, Kirin J. Callinan and Julian Sudek - local musicians would get together, curate an evening of new music, and perform it to an audience. One night, Winterfield took vocals and guitar and Ma generated sounds from the use of vintage drum machines, radio frequency manipulation, improvised percussion, and other esoteric methods of creating sound. By 2011, Ma and Winterfield began frequently getting together at a studio (often a living room) and recording sounds and melodies, whilst also swapping old demos from unfinished side projects, "Jaguar Paw" and "Flintstone". Subsequently, loose jams and recordings started as anything from Motown to electronica. It would be during these recording sessions that the band's first songs "Come Save Me" and "What Love" would emerge. At this point, the pair decided to semi-relocate to France and to extend what was originally "going to be a one off 7 inch single" to a full LP. Jack Freeman, a London-based musician and old friend, joined the live lineup in mid-2012. In June 2013, the band released Howlin', which reached the UK album chart. In 2015, the band toured as support to Tame Impala.

The duo began writing material at their Crescent Head studio in rural Australia, before returning to the farmhouse in La Briche, France to record. The record was finalised in London and featured guest appearances by Stella Mozgawa, Ewan Pearson and James Ford. In May 2016, Ma confirmed that the second album would be released in the second half of 2016. The band released the first single, "O B 1" in July, followed by a second "Give Me A Reason" in August 2016. The 11-track album, Every Now & Then, was released on 14 October 2016. Musicfeeds maintained that it "rewards a dedicated listener with a fine-tuned ear". NME gave the album four out of five stars, calling it "a mind-altering second album with melody at its heart" DIY Magazine said the album had Jagwar Ma "on a process of self-discovery, just a couple of steps away from striking gold." The band embarked on a headlining tour in support.

In 2018, the band began recording sessions in Iceland, however further tours and recordings were delayed by an illness which confined Ma to Australia. According to Jono, the band has "by no means disbanded". Both members have embarked on separate projects. Winterfield began a "surf blues" solo project as Golf Alpha Bravo, releasing singles "Groove Baby Groove", "Unwind", and "Blue Wave" via Mom+Pop Records in 2019. His full-length debut album, The Sundog, was released on his own label, Treasured Recordings, on 12 June 2020. Jono Ma started an ongoing project with Jonti called Mystics, who released their first single, "Steppers" in 2019, and performed live at Carriageworks in 2022. He also released an EP in collaboration with Dreems titled The Dreemas on Kompact in 2018, and a cover of Kraftwerk's "Neon Lights" on Bandcamp in 2020, in memory of Florian Schneider and Andrew Weatherall, with proceeds benefiting The Aboriginal Legal Service.

== Touring and shows ==
In 2014, Jagwar Ma played the Summer Festival circuit throughout the UK, EU and Australia including Reading and Leeds, Glastonbury, Pukkelpop, Latitude, Bestival, Paredes de Coura Festival, The Big Day Out, Splendour in the Grass among others. Jagwar Ma has played sold-out headline tours in the UK, France, Australia and the US.

In 2017, Jagwar Ma played at Summer Bright Lager's Summer Sessions Tour and at Coachella. In the summer of 2017, the band performed at Panorama Music Festival on Randall's Island in New York City and England's Glastonbury Festival.

In 2018, Jagwar Ma performed at Dark Mofo in Tasmania, headlining a Red Bull Music lineup.

== Members ==
- Gabriel Winterfield – lead vocals, guitar
- Jono Ma – guitar, synths, drum machines, samplers, producer
- Jack Freeman – bass

== Discography ==
=== Studio albums ===
Year	Album	Peak positions			
Year	Album	AUS	BEL (Wa)	FRA	UK
2013	Howlin': Mom + Pop Music (US); Marathon Artists (UK)	—	198	133	64
2016	Every Now & Then: Mom + Pop Music (US)	47	160	131	85

=== EPs ===
Year	EP
2013	The Time and Space Dub Sessions: Rough Trade Records/Marathon Artists

=== Singles ===
Title	Year	Album
"Come Save Me"	2011	Howlin
"The Throw"	2013	Howlin
"Man I Need"	2013	Howlin
"Come Save Me" (re-release)	2013	Howlin
"Uncertainty"	2014	Howlin
"O B 1"	2016	Every Now & Then
"Give Me a Reason"	2016	Every Now & Then
"Ordinary"	2016	Every Now & Then
"Slipping"	2016	Every Now & Then

== Awards ==
=== AIR Awards ===
The Australian Independent Record Awards (commonly known informally as AIR Awards) is an annual awards night to recognise, promote and celebrate the success of Australia's Independent Music sector.

Year	Nominee / work	Award	Result
2013	themselves	Best Independent Artist	Nominated
2013	Howlin'	Independent Album of the Year	Nominated
2013	Howlin'	Best Independent Dance/Electronic Club Album	Nominated
2013	"Man I Need"	Independent Single of the Year	Nominated
2013	"Man I Need"	Best Independent Dance/Electronic Club Song or EP	Nominated
2013	themselves	Carlton Dry Global Music Grant	Nominated
2017	Every Now and Then	Best Independent Dance/Electronic Album	Nominated

=== APRA Awards ===
The APRA Awards are presented annually from 1982 by the Australasian Performing Right Association (APRA), "honouring composers and songwriters". They commenced in 1982.

Year	Nominee / work	Award	Result	Ref.
2014	Jagwar Ma	Breakthrough Songwriter of the Year	Nominated	

=== Australian Music Prize ===
The Australian Music Prize (the AMP) is an annual award of $30,000 given to an Australian band or solo artist in recognition of the merit of an album released during the year of award. The commenced in 2005.

Year	Nominee / work	Award	Result
2013	Howlin'	Australian Music Prize	Nominated

=== J Award ===
The J Awards are an annual series of Australian music awards that were established by the Australian Broadcasting Corporation's youth-focused radio station Triple J. They commenced in 2005.

Year	Nominee / work	Award	Result
2013	Howlin'	Australian Album of the Year	Nominated
