= Ghostwood (band) =

Australian alternative-indie band

- Also known as: The Ghosts
- Origin: Sydney, New South Wales, Australia
- Genres: Indie; alternative; ambient; shoegaze; post-rock
- Years active: 2006–2011
- Labels: Modular/Universal
- Past members: Tom Crandles; Patrick Harrowsmith; James West; Gabriel Winterield; Rupert Parry

Ghostwood were an Australian alternative-indie band formed in 2006. The original line-up, known as the Ghosts, was Tom Crandles on bass guitar, Patrick Harrowsmith on lead guitar, James West on drums and Gabriel Winterield on lead vocals and rhythm guitar. They changed their name and were signed to Modular Recordings, which issued their self-titled extended play in August 2007. The group toured Australia in that year and then travelled to the United Kingdom during 2008 and 2009. They split up in 2011 with Winterfield joining Jagwar Ma. In mid-2019 they released their debut studio album, The Lost Album, which had been recorded ten years earlier.

== History ==
Ghostwood were formed in 2006 as the Ghosts in Sydney, but changed their name, "because 7 million other bands already have the name 'Ghosts'." They played their last show under the former name with Lost Valentinos at the Sydney Club The Annandale on 18 May 2007. Their line-up was Tom Crandles on bass guitar, Patrick Harrowsmith on lead guitar, James West on drums and Gabriel Winterield (a.k.a. Gabriel Navidzadeh) on lead vocals and rhythm guitar.

Ghostwood released a five track eponymous extended on 27 August 2007, which reached the ARIA Top 100 Physical Singles chart and also peaked at No. 6 on the ARIA Hitseekers Singles chart. Its lead single, "Red Version" was iTunes single of the week in late August 2007. Some tracks on the EP are about Pokémon, all of which except "Pencils" reference the video game series. Winterfield stated in an interview that "Red Version" is about the Pokémon Trading Card Game, but "Blue Version" is not.

The group toured Australia during 2007 and into the following year. In 2008 they relocated to the United Kingdom to perform, and they recorded material there in the next year.

Ghostwood released another EP, I Am Overcast (June 2011), two of its tracks, "Sunset Mirage" (2010) and "Cutlass" had high rotation on Australian youth radio Triple J. Richard Kingsmill of Triple J rated "Sunset Mirage" as five-out-of-five stars and explained, "Saw these guys a few years ago and they were all drone, no tunes. They took a break and wrote some new stuff. This is hopefully as good as the rest of what they've come up with." In March they co-headlined the bill at the Annandale Hotel with Laura Imbruglia and were supported by Young Revelry, the Betty Airs, Creepers, and Bonney Read.

Winterfield, their main songwriter, formed a dance and neo-psychedelic duo, Jagwar Ma with Jono Ma (ex-the Valentinos) in 2011 and Ghostwood disbanded. In mid-2019 Ghostwood released their debut studio album, The Lost Album, which had been recorded ten years earlier. Brad Abrahams of Sound the Sirens described how, "Hearing such a stellar album ten years after it was recorded, inevitably leads to questions of what could have been... hopefully through the power of the internet it will find its way into hearts of people who will appreciate its craftsmanship."

== Members ==
- Tom Crandles – bass guitar 2006–2011
- Paddy Harrowsmith – lead guitar
- James West – drums
- Gabriel Winterfield – lead vocals, rhythm guitar
- Rupert Parry – bass guitar

== Tours ==
- Toured the UK in 2008–09
- Toured Australia with The Jesus & Mary Chain in April 2008
- Toured Australia with Maxïmo Park in August 2007
- Co-headline tour of Australia with Mercy Arms in August/September 2007
- Toured Australia with Ash in July 2007
- Toured with Silversun Pickups in Australia in September 2007
- Played at the first Australian V Festival in early 2007
- Toured with Red Riders in mid-2006

== Discography ==
=== Albums ===
- The Lost Album (July 2019)

=== Extended plays ===
- Ghostwood (27 August 2007) – Modular Recordings/Universal Music Australia (UMA MODEP021)

Track listing

1. "Red Version" - 3:45
2. "Blue Version" - 2:45
3. "Ghost" - 3:54
4. "Run" - 2:49
5. "Pencils" - 4:10
- I Am Overcast (June 2011)
