= Spectral Display =

Dutch musical group

- Origin: Amsterdam, Netherlands
- Genres: New wave, synth-pop, dub
- Years active: 1982–1984, 2019–present
- Label: EMI
- Past members: Michel Mulders: Henri Overduin; Paul Simon; Adriana Romijn
- Website: spectraldisplay.nl

Spectral Display is a Dutch new wave group formed by Amsterdam-based synthesizer player Michel Mulders. The group achieved success in 1982 with the single "It Takes a Muscle to Fall in Love", released in 13 countries. and also covered by M.I.A. in 2010 and Kirin J. Callinan in 2019. The group returned after a lengthy hiatus with the announcement of their 2020 album You Steal My Heart, with new member Paul Simon.

== Discography ==
=== Albums ===
- Spectral Display (1982), EMI
- Too Much Like Me (1984), EMI
- You Steal My Heart (2020), Spectral-Records

=== Singles ===
- "It Takes a Muscle to Fall in Love" (1982), EMI (featuring Henri Overduin)
- "There a Virus Going Round" (1982), EMI
- "Electric Circus" (1982), EMI
- "Danceable" (1984), EMI
- "Legendary" (1984), EMI
- "Too Much Like Me" (1984), EMI
- "It Takes a Muscle to Fall in Love (Remix)" (2019), Spectral-Records
- "It Takes a Muscle (Reggae)" (2019), Spectral-Records
- "To Me You're Everything" (2021), Spectral-Records
- "You're My Religion" (2021), Spectral-Records
