= Zone (Cloud Control album) =

Studio album by Cloud Control
- Released: 1 September 2017
- Length: 40:42
- Label: Ivy League
- Producers: Alister Wright, George Nicholas, Wayne Connolly, Eric J Dubowsky

Cloud Control chronology
Dream Cave (2013)	Zone (2017)

Singles from Dream Cave
- 1. "Rainbow City" Released: 12 May 2017; 2. "Zone (This Is How It Feels)" Released: 28 July 2017; 3. "Treetops" Released: 28 July 2017; 4. "Panopticon" Released: January 2018

Zone is the third and final studio album by Australian band Cloud Control. The album was released on 1 September 2017 and peaked at number 53 on the ARIA Charts.

The album is Alister Wright's production debut and was supported with a five date Australian tour in September and October 2017.

== Reception ==
Professional ratings
Review scores
Source	Rating
The Music	3.5/5 stars

Adam Wilding from The Music said "The third album from the Blue Mountains trio was four years in the making and has stepped away from the dream pop that soaked their much-lauded albums Bliss Release and Dream Cave. Having lost a bass player but gained production skill (lead singer Alister Wright recorded and mixed the album) Zone reveals a band that have grown up."

Nastassia Baroni from Music Feeds said "Zone took longer than expected to come together. But, with time comes finesse, and Zone is rich with sonic exploration, musical innovation and emotional perception."

Perth Underground said "With the band wielding complete control over the album, Zone possesses the dreamy, psych-infused sound that initially marked Cloud Control as a stalwart fixture in Australia’s music scene, while also evoking feelings of loss and nostalgia."

Langdon Hickman from Treblezine said "Cloud Control deliver a psychically confused record on Zone" adding "Cloud Control shows a firm grasp of song structures that don’t allow the tune to tire out before they cut the tape and enough production acumen to give each section its own identifiable trait."

== Track listing ==
All tracks are written by Cloud Control (except where noted).

No.	Title	Length
1.	"Zone (This Is How It Feels)"	4:09
2.	"Treetops"	4:25
3.	"Rainbow City"	3:10
4.	"Panopticon"	3:23
5.	"Lights on the Chrome"	4:10
6.	"Goldfish"	3:42
7.	"Lacuna"	4:22
8.	"Mum's Spaghetti"	4:49
9.	"Summer Rave"	3:50
10.	"Find Me in the Water" (written by Douglas Wright)	4:33
Total length:		46:46

== Charts ==
Chart (2017)	Peak position
Australian Albums (ARIA)	53
