= Dream Cave (album) =

Studio album by Cloud Control
- Released: 9 August 2013
- Length: 44:29
- Label: Ivy League Records
- Producer: Barny Barnicott, Cloud Control

Cloud Control chronology
Bliss Release (2010)	Dream Cave (2013)	Zone (2017)

Singles from Dream Cave
- 1. "Dojo Rising" Released: 3 June 2013; 2. "Scar" Released: July 2013; 3. "Promises" Released: 28 October 2013; 4. "Moonrabbit" Released: February 2014

Dream Cave is the second studio album by Australian band Cloud Control. The album was released on 9 August 2013 and peaked at number 9 on the ARIA Charts. At the J Awards of 2013, The album was nominated for Australian Album of the Year and was nominated for the 2013 Australian Music Prize.

The artwork is by Leif Podhajsky.

An acoustic version of the album was released for free download on 8 October 2013.

== Reception ==
Professional ratings
Review scores
Source	Rating
The Guardian	4/5 stars
Irish Times	3/5 stars
AllMusic	3.5/5 stars
DIY Magazine	3.5/5 stars

Charlotte Richardson Andrews from The Guardian said "There's a pleasing, high-pitched ache to frontman Alister Wright's vocals, and an ambivalent feeling has the album sliding between 70s rock-hippy sweetness and moodier fare."

Siobhán Kane from Irish Times said "Dream Cave is full of space and disparate influences" adding "Cloud Control are caught between the past and the future, with singer Alister Wright searching out firm ground. When they are conservative, it doesn't work as well (on, for example, the plodding 'Tombstone'). But when they cut loose, as on the synth-based 'Island Living', they are tremendous."

Gregory Heaney from AllMusic said "With just the right balance of brooding and brightness, Dream Cave is one of those albums that seems tailor-made for rainy day reflection, with Cloud Control giving listeners just the push they need to go into their own heads and look around for a bit"

Cam Findlay from The Music said "[There's] a lot going on here. It could've been a mess: there's so much inspiration leaking in from decades of music, film and art in general, a dog's breakfast might've been an apt description. But Cloud Control don't care. Their obvious love of meshing sounds and easy coolness turns this into a grand adventure of sound and, at the best moments, light and shade."

In a 2024 review, Tom Morris from DIY Magazine said it's "an album that flits between playful cheeriness and melancholy with an almost worrying sense of ease."

== Track listing ==
All tracks are written by Cloud Control.

Standard edition
No.	Title	Length
1.	"Scream Rave"	1:48
2.	"Dojo Rising"	4:20
3.	"Promises"	3:23
4.	"Moonrabbit"	3:43
5.	"Island Living"	3:35
6.	"The Smoke, The Feeling"	4:35
7.	"Scar"	3:43
8.	"Happy Birthday"	3:09
9.	"Ice Age Heatwave"	4:00
10.	"Tombstone"	6:05
11.	"Dream Cave"	6:08
Total length:		46:46

== Charts ==
Chart (2013)	Peak position
Australian Albums (ARIA)	9

== Personnel ==
- Alister Wright – lead vocals, rhythm guitar
- Heidi Lenffer – vocals, keyboards
- Ulrich Lenffer – drums, percussion
- Jeremy Kelshaw – vocals, bass guitar
