= V Festival (Australia) =

Music festival in Australia

- Genre: Rock, pop
- Dates: March/April
- Locations: Australia: Sydney (2007–2009); Gold Coast (2007–2009); Melbourne (2008–2009); Perth (2008–2009)
- Years active: 2007–2009
- Website: vfestival.com.au

The Australian V Festival was an Australian music festival, and a spin-off of the British V Festival. Like all V Festivals, the event was primarily sponsored by Virgin Mobile. In Australia the event was also sponsored by airline Virgin Blue. The V Festival was televised exclusively in Australia by MTV, and from 2008, also by its sister channel VH1. In 2008 the festival expanded to four shows, with Melbourne and Perth being added. Since the 2009 V Festival the event has been in hiatus, with the official website stating "V Festival Australia is taking a break at the moment".

== Artist line-ups ==
=== Artist line-up 2009 ===
The festival's first announcement was made on 18 November 2008, with the second announcement occurring on 11 February 2009.

| | Sydney | Melbourne | Perth | Gold Coast |
|---|---|---|---|---|
| The Killers | Yes | Yes | Yes | Yes |
| Snow Patrol | Yes | Yes | Yes | Yes |
| Kaiser Chiefs | Yes | Yes | Yes | Yes |
| Madness | Yes | Yes | Yes | Yes |
| Elbow | Yes | Yes | Yes | Yes |
| Duffy | Yes | Yes | Yes | Yes |
| The Human League | Yes | Yes | Yes | Yes |
| Razorlight | Yes | Yes | Yes | Yes |
| The Kills | Yes | Yes | Yes | Yes |
| M83 | Yes | Yes | Yes | Yes |
| The Dø | Yes | Yes | Yes | Yes |
| Louis XIV | Yes | Yes | Yes | Yes |
| Jenny Lewis | Yes | Yes | Yes | Yes |
| Jackson Jackson | Yes | Yes | Yes | Yes |
| Howling Bells | Yes | Yes | Yes | Yes |
| Tame Impala | Yes | Yes | Yes | Yes |
| Wolf & Cub | Yes | Yes | Yes | Yes |
| Children Collide | Yes | Yes | Yes | Yes |
| The Temper Trap | Yes | Yes | Yes | Yes |
| Canyons | Yes | Yes | Yes | Yes |
| Black Rose | Yes | Yes | No | No |
| Vanilla Ice | Yes | Yes | No | Yes |

=== Artist lineup 2008 ===
The festival's first announcement was made on 28 November 2007. The festival's second announcement was made on 10 February 2008. It included the return of the Virgin Mobile Venue, the festival's fourth stage, which featured local and international DJs.

| | Sydney | Melbourne | Perth | Gold Coast |
|---|---|---|---|---|
| The Smashing Pumpkins | Yes | Yes | Yes | Yes |
| Duran Duran | Yes | Yes | Yes | Yes |
| Queens of the Stone Age | Yes | Yes | Yes | Yes |
| The Jesus and Mary Chain | Yes | Yes | Yes | Yes |
| The Presets | Yes | Yes | Yes | Yes |
| Air | Yes | Yes | No | Yes |
| Cansei de Ser Sexy | Yes | Yes | Yes | Yes |
| The Tough Alliance | Yes | Yes | Yes | Yes |
| Plug in City | Yes | Yes | Yes | Cancelled |
| Modest Mouse | Yes | Yes | Yes | Yes |
| Róisín Murphy | Yes | Yes | Yes | Yes |
| Hot Hot Heat | Yes | Yes | Yes | Yes |
| The Rakes | Yes | Yes | Yes | Yes |
| Cut Copy | Yes | Yes | Yes | Yes |
| Glass Candy | Yes | Yes | Yes | Yes |
| Robyn | Yes | Yes | No | Yes |
| Doom & Hoodrat | Yes | Yes | Yes | Yes |
| Munk (Gomma) | Yes | Yes | Yes | Yes |
| Flosstradamus (USA) | Yes | Yes | Yes | Yes |
| Mike Simonetti (Italians Do It Better) | Yes | Yes | Yes | Yes |
| Andee Van Damage | Yes | Yes | Yes | Yes |
| Mika* | Cancelled | Cancelled | No | Cancelled |

- *Mika was originally featured in the first announcement, but cancelled due to recording commitments.

=== Artist lineup 2007 ===
The festival ran two shows in its inaugural year: one at Centennial Park in Sydney on 31 March and one at Avica Resort on the Gold Coast on 1 April.

| | Sydney | Gold Coast |
|---|---|---|
| Pixies | Yes | Yes |
| Beck | Yes | Yes |
| Pet Shop Boys | Yes | Yes |
| Groove Armada | Yes | Yes |
| Jarvis Cocker | Yes | Yes |
| Gnarls Barkley | Yes | Yes |
| New York Dolls | Yes | Yes |
| Soulwax – Nite Versions | Yes | Yes |
| 2ManyDJs | Yes | Yes |
| The Rapture | Yes | Yes |
| Phoenix | Yes | Yes |
| Softlightes | Yes | Yes |
| Bumblebeez | Yes | Yes |
| Muscles | Yes | No |
| Mercy Arms | Yes | Yes |
| Ghostwood | Yes | Yes |
| Lost Valentinos | Yes | Yes |
| The Temper Trap | Yes | Yes |
| Seabellies | Yes | Yes |
| Kitsuné DJs | Yes | Yes |
| The Bang Gang Deejays | Yes | Yes |
| Rub-N-Tug | Yes | Yes |
| Andee Frost | Yes | Yes |

== Sideshows and others ==
=== Best of V Festival (Mini V) 2007 ===
The promoter of the festival, Michael Coppel, declared Melbourne a "festival graveyard", and did not book a venue for the festival in the city, despite the fact that several very successful Big Day Out festivals had been held in Melbourne since 1993. Adelaide also missed out on the festival, disappointing many Victorian and South Australian fans who were hoping to see Pixies on their first Australian tour.

To make up for the omission, a "Best of V Festival" series of concerts was organised, also called "Mini V", in which the Pet Shop Boys, Groove Armada, Gnarls Barkley and The Rapture played in Melbourne (at the Sidney Myer Music Bowl) on 3 April, while Pixies, Jarvis Cocker, Phoenix and New York Dolls played in Adelaide (at the Thebarton Theatre) on the same night. The following night (4 April) the line-ups swapped cities with Pet Shop Boys playing in Adelaide and Pixies playing in Melbourne.

The move was controversial, however, with tickets for one night at the Melbourne show costing only slightly less ($110 in Melbourne, $99 in Adelaide) than a festival ticket ($124), and double that to attend both nights. The promoter responded that the similar cost was to do with the economics of scale regarding the smaller capacity venues in Melbourne and Adelaide.

=== V Festival Sideshows 2008 ===
The Best Of shows did not return in 2008, for several reasons. Firstly, Melbourne was given a full V Festival for 2008, due to the availability of the newly renovated Showgrounds. Secondly, Adelaide, after again missing out on a full-scale festival, received, along with other capital cities in Australia and New Zealand, a variety of sideshows from V Festival artists, intended to replace the Best Of shows.

The sideshow schedule was as follows:

| City | Venue | Date | Notes |
|---|---|---|---|
The Smashing Pumpkins
| Wellington | TSB Arena | 20 March 2008 | with Queens of the Stone Age |
| Auckland | Vector Arena | 22 March 2008 | with Queens of the Stone Age |
| Christchurch | Westpac Arena | 24 March 2008 | with Queens of the Stone Age |
| Sydney | Hordern Pavilion | 27 March 2008 | |
| Brisbane | Brisbane Convention & Exhibition Centre | 31 March 2008 | |
| Adelaide | Adelaide Entertainment Centre | 2 April 2008 | with Queens of the Stone Age |
| Melbourne | Festival Hall, Melbourne | 4 April 2008 | |
Duran Duran
| Auckland | Vector Arena | 26 March 2008 | |
| Sydney | Sydney Entertainment Centre | 28 March 2008 | |
| Adelaide | Adelaide Entertainment Centre | 1 April 2008 | |
| Melbourne | Palais Theatre | 3 April 2008 | |
Queens of the Stone Age
| Wellington | TSB Arena | 20 March 2008 | with The Smashing Pumpkins |
| Auckland | Vector Arena | 22 March 2008 | with The Smashing Pumpkins |
| Christchurch | Westpac Arena | 24 March 2008 | with The Smashing Pumpkins |
| Brisbane | The Arena | 27 March 2008 | |
| Sydney | Luna Park, Sydney | 28 March 2008 | |
| Melbourne | Palace Theatre | 1 April 2008 | |
| Adelaide | Adelaide Entertainment Centre | 2 April 2008 | with The Smashing Pumpkins |
| Hobart | Hobart City Hall | 4 April 2008 | |
The Jesus and Mary Chain
| Brisbane | The Arena | 1 April 2008 | |
| Sydney | Enmore Theatre | 2 April 2008 | |
| Melbourne | Palace Theatre | 3 April 2008 | |
AIR
| Perth | Kings Park & Botanic Gardens | 27 March 2008 | |
| Brisbane | The Tivoli | 31 March 2008 | |
| Melbourne | Palais Theatre | 2 April 2008 | |
| Adelaide | Thebarton Theatre | 3 April 2008 | |
| Sydney | Sydney Opera House | 6 April 2008 | Sold out in 10 minutes |
| Sydney | Sydney Opera House | 7 April 2008 | |
Modest Mouse w/ Hot Hot Heat
| Brisbane | The Arena | 31 March 2008 | |
| Melbourne | Palace Theatre | 2 April 2008 | |
| Sydney | Luna Park, Sydney | 3 April 2008 | |
Róisín Murphy
| Brisbane | The Tivoli | 1 April 2008 | |
| Sydney | Metro Theatre | 2 April 2008 | |
| Melbourne | Billboard | 4 April 2008 | |

== See also ==
- V Festival (UK)
- Virgin Festival (North America)
