= Mercy Arms =

Australian inde rock band

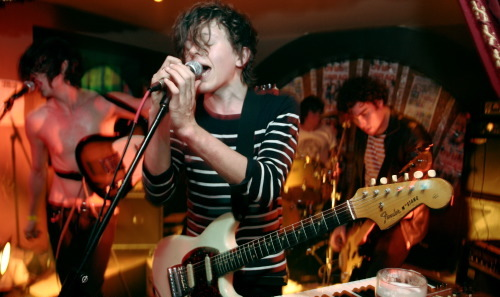
- Mercy Arms performing in 2007

Background information
- Origin: Sydney, Australia
- Genres: Indie rock, rock and roll, dream pop
- Years active: 2005–2009
- Past members: Thom Moore; Kirin J. Callinan; Ash Moss; Julian Sudek; Alex Coutts
- Website: www.myspace.com/mercyarms

Mercy Arms were an Australian indie rock band formed in early 2005. The four-piece were made up of Thom Moore (lead vocals, guitar), Kirin J. Callinan (guitar), Ash Moss (bass guitar) and Julian Sudek (drums, percussion). Their debut self-titled album was issued in August 2008 and peaked at No. 10 on the ARIA Hitseekers Albums component chart. The band dissolved in February 2009 after four years together.

== History ==
The band formed in 2005 after Moore met Callinan and Sudek at a Morning After Girls show. Callinan and Sudek lived in the same area and were childhood friends. Bassist Ash Moss joined the band soon after. The band played their first show in April 2005, three days after their first rehearsal.

2006 saw the band tour Australia with The Strokes, record two tracks with Dave Sitek from TV on the Radio, and after an intense bidding war, eventually sign with Capitol Records in the US. However, the deal would be short-lived, and 2007 saw the band part ways with Capitol after its merger with Virgin. The band toured with the Pixies, Editors, Cut Copy, Wolf & Cub and the Horrors, and played at the Sydney and Gold Coast legs of the V Festival. The band's first release, the Kept Low EP, was recorded and released August 2007 on Levity in Australia.

On their self-titled debut album, released in Australia independently in August 2008, they collaborated with producer Tony Cohen and mixed the album in Melbourne with Tony Espie. It peaked at No. 10 on the ARIA Hitseekers Albums component chart.

Mercy Arms have been on hiatus since February 2009 after touring with the Big Day Out nationally. This is mainly credited to Callinan and Moore's creative differences. Other groups and projects involving Mercy Arms members include FLRL (Fashion Launches Rocket Launches), started by Kirin J. Callinan & Julian Sudek with Jono Ma of Lost Valentinos & Daniel Stricker of Midnight Juggernauts, Kirin performing solo as Kirin J. Callinan and playing guitar in Jack Ladder's band, Julian Sudek playing in Canyons & Danimals, Ash Moss playing bass in Dark Bells.

== Members ==
- Thom Moore – vocals, guitar
- Kirin J. Callinan – guitar noise, vocals
- Ash Moss – bass guitar
- Julian Sudek – drums
- Alex Coutts

== Discography ==
=== Kept Low EP ===
1. "Kept Low" – 2:57
2. "Shot Right Down" – 6:49
3. "Ending To Begin" – 3:30
4. "Uptown Address" – 3:24
5. "Scream" – 3:14
6. "Loitering with Intent" (download only)

=== Limited pressing singles ===
1. "Always"
2. "Sacred Heart"
3. "Julie"
4. "Quit Your Fooling"

=== "Half Right" (Single) ===
1. "Half Right"
2. "Quit Your Fooling"
3. "Always" (download only)

=== Mercy Arms (Self-titled album) ===
1. "Down Here, So Long"
2. "Half Right"
3. "Footsteps"
4. "To Me Now"
5. "Kilby"
6. "Speed"
7. "Shine A Light Down"
8. "Caroline"
9. "Firing Line"
10. "On & On"
11. "1956 State Fair" (download only)

== Touring ==
=== Past touring ===
- Supported The Strokes on the 2006 Australian Tour.
- Supported Wolf & Cub on the 2006 Australian tour
- Supported Cut Copy on the 'Hearts on fire' 2007 Australia tour.
- Australian "Kept Low" tour, supported nationally by Ghostwood
- Supported Editors as part of the Splendour in the Grass sideshows in August 2007 throughout Australia.
- Supported The Horrors on their 2007 Australian Tour.
- Supported The Pixies on their Sydney show in 2007.
- Australian album tour, supported nationally by The Process
- Supported Cut Copy on their 2008 UK & Scandinavia Tour
- Australian "Down Here So Long" tour, December 2008.
