= Cities of Gold (album) =

Studio album by Lost Valentinos
- Released: 9 September 2009
- Recorded: 2008–2009
- Genre: Indie rock, synthpop, dance-punk
- Length: 42:29
- Label: etcetc
- Producer: Ewan Pearson

Cities of Gold is the debut album by Australian band Lost Valentinos, released on 9 September 2009 in Australia by etcetc. Produced by Ewan Pearson, it would be the bands only album.

== Track listing ==
1. "Midnights" – 3:37
2. "In The City Of Gold" – 2:31
3. "Serio" – 4:00
4. "Francisco (Y Los Trece De La Fama)" – 5:06
5. "The Bismarck" – 4:11
6. "Thief" – 3:56
7. "Between The Squalls" – 2:27
8. "Nightmoves" – 4:28
9. "Dark That I Love" – 3:59
10. "Great Leap Forward" – 3:54
11. "Happiness Made Easy" – 4:20
