= There's Nothing in the Water We Can't Fight =

Single by Cloud Control

from the album Bliss Release
- Released: July 2010
- Length: 3:21
- Label: Ivy League Records / Infectious Music
- Songwriters: Jeremy Kelshaw; Ulrich Lenffer; Heidi Lenffer; Alister Wright
- Producer: Wayne Connolly

Cloud Control singles chronology
"This Is What I Said" (2010)	"There's Nothing in the Water We Can't Fight" (2010)	"Meditation Song No. 2 (Why Oh Why)" (2010)

"There's Nothing in the Water We Can't Fight" is a song by Australian band Cloud Control. It was released in July 2010 as the fourth single from their debut studio album, Bliss Release.

Band member Alister Wright told Double J the song was written after a trip to India, saying, "I was in a hotel room looking out over this alleyway and there was like a funeral procession. They're all just walking down the street, banging their chests and screaming out. It was such a passionate kind of celebration of someone. I just thought it was really cool. And the lyrics aren't really literal. Like, I'm not describing something, but I just tried to put that kind of feeling into the performance."

The song was voted 18 in the Triple J Hottest 100, 2010.

== Critical reception ==
In a BBC album review, Iain Moffatt said the song "is both impelling and intriguing."

== Track listings ==
Digital download
No.	Title	Length
1.	"There's Nothing in the Water We Can't Fight" (album version)	4:00

CD single (INFECT126CDP)
No.	Title	Length
1.	"There's Nothing in the Water We Can't Fight" (radio version)	3:21
2.	"There's Nothing in the Water We Can't Fight" (album version)	4:00
3.	"Hollow Drums"	3:00
4.	"There's Nothing in the Water We Can't Fight" (Video)

vinyl single (INFECT126S)
No.	Title	Length
1.	"There's Nothing in the Water We Can't Fight"	3:52
2.	"There's Nothing in the Water We Can't Fight" (BretonLABS Remix)	3:22

== Charts ==
Chart (2011)	Peak position
UK Physical Singles (OCC)	35

== Certifications ==
Region	Certification	Certified units/sales
Australia (ARIA)	Gold	35,000^{‡}
^{‡} Sales+streaming figures based on certification alone.

== Release history ==
Region	Date	Edition	Label	Ref.
Australia	July 2010	digital download / video	Ivy League Records	n/a
United Kingdom	2011	CD single	Infectious Music	INFECT126CDP
United Kingdom	7 March 2011	vinyl record	Infectious Music	INFECT126S
