= Howlin' (Jagwar Ma album) =

Studio album by Jagwar Ma
- Released: 13 August 2013
- Genre: Indie rock, madchester, indietronica, synthpop, experimental, alternative dance
- Length: 48:28
- Label: Mom + Pop

Jagwar Ma chronology
Howlin' (2013)	Every Now & Then (2016)

Singles from Howlin
- 1. "Come Save Me" Released: 24 January 2012; 2. "The Throw" Released: 1 February 2013; 3. "Man I Need" Released: 20 May 2013; 4. "Uncertainty" Released: 31 January 2014

Professional ratings
Aggregate scores
Source	Rating
AnyDecentMusic?	7.6/10
Metacritic	79/100
Review scores
Source	Rating
AllMusic	4/5 stars
Consequence of Sound	3.5/5 stars
Financial Times	4/5 stars
The Irish Times	4/5 stars
Mojo	4/5 stars
NME	9/10
The Observer	3/5 stars
Pitchfork	7.7/10
Q	4/5 stars
Uncut	7/10

Howlin' is the debut album by Australian dance-rock band Jagwar Ma. It was released in June 2013 under Mom + Pop Music in the United States, Marathon in the United Kingdom and Europe, and Future Classic in Australia and New Zealand.

At the J Awards of 2013, the album was nominated for Australian Album of the Year.

The album was written and performed by band members Jono Ma and Gabriel Winterfield, and recorded and produced by Ma. It was mixed primarily by Ewan Pearson with additional mixes by Ma, Anthony Garvin and Steve Dub.

== Track listing ==
No.	Title	Length
1.	"What Love"	3:53
2.	"Uncertainty"	4:02
3.	"The Throw"	6:43
4.	"That Loneliness"	2:52
5.	"Come Save Me"	5:14
6.	"Four"	6:32
7.	"Let Her Go"	2:56
8.	"Man I Need"	3:36
9.	"Exercise"	4:04
10.	"Did You Have To"	2:59
11.	"Backwards Berlin"	5:37

== Charts ==
Chart (2013)	Peak position
Belgian Albums (Ultratop Wallonia)	198
French Albums (SNEP)	133
UK Albums (OCC)	64
UK Independent Albums (OCC)	13
US Heatseekers Albums (Billboard)	37
