= J Awards of 2013 =

Annual Australian music awards

- Date: 22 November 2013
- Venue: Australia
- Website: abc.net.au/triplej

The J Award of 2013 was the ninth annual J Awards, established by the Australian Broadcasting Corporation's youth-focused radio station Triple J. The announcement comes at the culmination of Ausmusic Month (November). For the sixth and final year, three awards were presented; Australian Album of the Year, Australian Music Video of the Year and Unearthed Artist of the Year.

The winners were announced on Triple J on Friday 22 November 2013.

== Who's eligible? ==
Any Australian album released independently or through a record company, or sent to Triple J in consideration for airplay, is eligible for the J Award. The 2013 nominations for Australian Album of the Year and Australian Music Video of the Year were selected from releases received by Triple J between November 2012 and October 2013. For Unearthed Artist of the Year it was open to any artist from the Unearthed (talent contest), who has had a ground breaking and impactful 12 months from November 2012 and October 2013.

== Awards ==
=== Australian Album of the Year ===
| Artist | Album Title | Result |
|---|---|---|
| Flume | Flume | Won |
| Big Scary | Not Art | Nominated |
| Northlane | Singularity | Nominated |
| Karnivool | Asymmetry | Nominated |
| Horrorshow | King Amongst Many | Nominated |
| Abbe May | Kiss My Apocalypse | Nominated |
| Boy & Bear | Harlequin Dream | Nominated |
| RÜFÜS | Atlas | Nominated |
| The Drones | I See Seaweed | Nominated |
| Cloud Control | Dream Cave | Nominated |
| Jagwar Ma | Howlin' | Nominated |

=== Australian Video of the Year ===
| Director | Artist and Song | Result |
|---|---|---|
| Josh Thomas | Clubfeet - "Everything You Wanted" | Won |
| Christian J Heinrich & Nicholas Rabone | Bluejuice - "SOS" | Nominated |
| Darcy Prendergast | The Paper Kites - "Young" | Nominated |
| Matt Campbell | Kingswood - "Ohio" | Nominated |
| Adam Callen | Thundamentals - "Smiles Don't Lie" | Nominated |
| Dimitri Basil (co-directed by Laura Gorun) | Vance Joy - "Riptide" | Nominated |

=== Unearthed Artist of the Year ===
| Artist | Result |
|---|---|
| Remi | Won |
| Tigertown | Nominated |
| SAFIA | Nominated |
| Jeremy Neale | Nominated |
| Wave Racer | Nominated |
| Dustin Tebutt | Nominated |
| Jackie Onassis | Nominated |
