= Molly Lewis (whistler) =

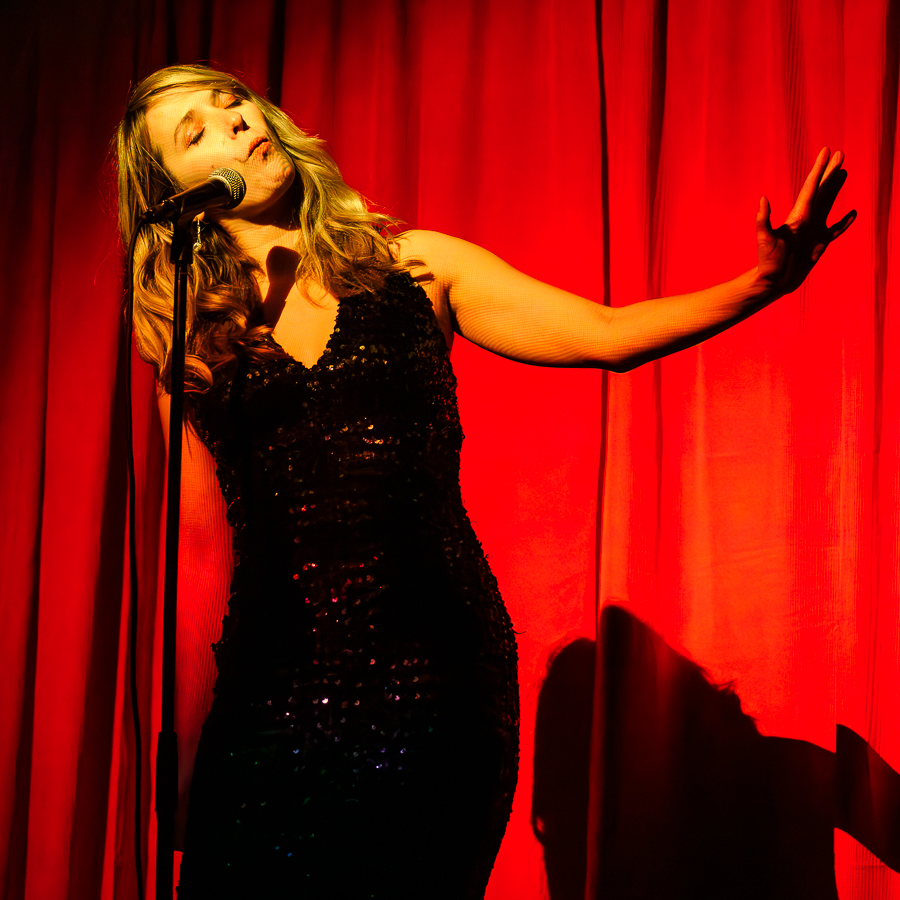
- Lewis in 2025 on stage at Parkteatret, Oslo

Background information
- Born: Sydney, Australia
- Occupation: Musician
- Label: Jagjaguwar
- Website: molly-lewis.com

Molly Lewis is an Australian musician known for her whistling. She featured in a rendition of Billie Eilish's "What Was I Made For?" for the 2023 movie Barbie, and has collaborated with musicians such as Dr. Dre, Karen O, and Jackson Browne.

== Early life and education ==
Molly Lewis was born in Sydney, Australia. She is the daughter of the documentary filmmaker Mark Lewis and music supervisor Rhyl Lewis.

She attended Byron Bay High School in Byron Bay, New South Wales, and enjoyed whistling in her youth.

== Career ==
After her parents showed her the documentary Pucker Up: The Fine Art of Whistling, about the 2012 International Whistlers Convention in North Carolina, she realised that she could make a career of whistling. She later won first place in the Live Band Accompaniment Division (female) at 2015's Masters of Musical Whistling competition in Los Angeles, after her family had moved there.

She appeared in Kirin J. Callinan's song and video "Big Enough" in 2017.

Her debut EP The Forgotten Edge was released in 2021 on Jagjaguwar, after the label saw her lounge show Café Molly in Los Angeles. In the same year, her single "Oceanic Feeling" was featured in two episodes of the third season of Max TV Series Doom Patrol and also season 3 of the FX show Atlanta. This was followed by a second EP Mirage in 2022.

For the 2023 movie Barbie she collaborated with Mark Ronson and Andrew Wyatt, with Lewis whistling a rendition of Billie Eilish's "What Was I Made For?"; their track "Meeting Ruth" was released on the film's score album.

Her debut LP On the Lips was released on 16 February 2024 on Jagjaguwar.

Other work has included whistling for a wedding celebration in Spain, and whistling the walk-on music for a famous wrestler. She has also performed with musicians such as Dr. Dre, Karen O, and Jackson Browne.

In May 2026 Lewis returned to Australia to attend the premiere of the documentary feature Whistle at the Sydney Film Festival. Directed by Christopher Nelius, the film centres on the Masters of Musical Whistling competition in Los Angeles, and features Lewis.

Lewis collaborated with François Tétaz on the soundtrack for the Netflix series My Brilliant Career, which was released on 13 August 2026.

== Personal life ==
Lewis moved to Los Angeles in her youth, later moving to New York City and then, around early 2026, to London, England.

She has released a brand of her own brand of lip balm.
