= Cloud Control =

Australian alternative rock band

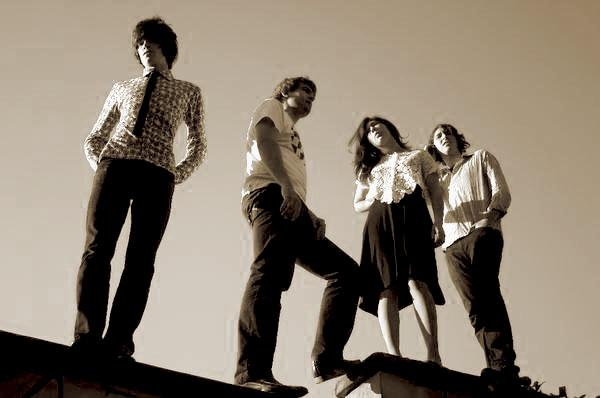

Background information
- Origin: Blue Mountains, NSW, Australia
- Genres: Alternative rock; indie rock; psychedelic rock
- Years active: 2007–2018, 2025–present
- Label: Ivy League Records
- Spinoffs: Vlossom
- Members: Alister Wright; Heidi Lenffer; Ulrich Lenffer; Jeremy Kelshaw
- Past members: Doug Wright
- Website: Cloud Control

Cloud Control is an Australian alternative rock band, originating from the Blue Mountains near Sydney, Australia. For the majority of their initial run, the band was signed to the Australian record label Ivy League Records, on which they released their first album, Bliss Release. They were also signed to Infectious Music in the UK and Europe, Humming Records in Germany, and Votiv in North America. The band was nominated for several awards in Australia, including two ARIA Music Awards. The band won the Australian Music Prize on 3 March 2011 for Bliss Release.

Throughout the 2010s, the band supported a number of local and international acts, including Arcade Fire, Vampire Weekend, Supergrass, The Magic Numbers, Yves Klein Blue, The Temper Trap, Last Dinosaurs, Local Natives and Weezer.

== History ==
=== 2007-2012: formation and Bliss Release ===
In 2007 the group was hastily formed so they could enter a university battle of the bands competition. with Alister recalling in 2011, "None of us had written songs before and I'd never sung anything. We were completely fresh". The group entered for a second time and subsequently won and recorded and released their debut EP, Cloud Control, in November 2007. Several songs were uploaded onto Triple J Unearthed.

They signed with Ivy League Records in 2008, with their debut single "Death Cloud" released in November 2008.

After a string of festival appearances and tours with a variety of Australian bands, the band released its first album, Bliss Release, in 2010. They recorded the album in the house of their producer, Liam Judson. Single "There's Nothing In The Water We Can't Fight" appeared at number 18 in the Triple J Hottest 100, 2010. The single "Gold Canary" was voted as Single of the Week in the Rebel Playlist on the UK's BBC Radio 6 Music 2010.

=== 2013-2018: Dream Cave & Zone ===
Their second album, Dream Cave, was released on 9 August 2013, which peaked at number 9 on the ARIA charts. A free acoustic album titled Dream Cave Unplugged was released on 8 October 2013 before becoming available from Apple Music for purchase in February 2014.

On 3 January 2015, the bass guitarist, Jeremy Kelshaw, announced his departure from the group on the band's Facebook page.

The band's third studio album, Zone was released on 1 September 2017. Their label said the album was written in a small beach house near the NSW regional centre of Forster and has been described as "profound, but also flippant, euphoric, but conceptual". The album peaked at number 53 on the ARIA Charts.

The band quietly disbanded in 2018, with Alister Wright beginning a new solo project, Vlossom, while Heidi Lenffer pursued entrepreneurial work as the leader of FEAT.

=== 2025: reunion ===
In 2025, Cloud Control announced their reunion for a run of shows celebrating the 15-year anniversary of Bliss Release.

== Band members ==
- Alister ("Al") Wright – lead vocals, guitar (2005–2018, 2025–present)
- Heidi Lenffer – keyboards, backing vocals, percussion (2005–2018, 2025–present)
- Ulrich Lenffer – drums, percussion, backing vocals (2005–2018, 2025–present)
- Jeremy Kelshaw – bass guitar, backing vocals, percussion (2005–2015, 2025–present)

Past members

- Doug Wright – bass guitar (2017–2018)

== Discography ==
=== Studio albums ===
Title	Details	Peak chart positions		
Title	Details	AUS	UK	UK indi
Bliss Release	Released: May 2010; Label: Ivy League Records (IVY090); Format: CD, digital download, LP	19	136	17
Dream Cave	Released: 9 August 2013; Label: Ivy League Records (IVY196); Format: CD, digital download, LP	9	-	29
Zone	Released: 1 September 2017; Label: Ivy League Records (IVY384); Format: CD, digital download, LP	53	-	-

=== Other albums ===
Title	Details
Dream Cave Unplugged	Released: 8 October 2013 (Note: Dream Cave Unplugged was released as free download on 8 October 2013 before becoming available from Apple Music for purchase in February 2014.); Label: Ivy League Records; Format: CD

=== Extended plays ===
Title	Details
Cloud Control	Released: November 2007; Label: Meow Music (MM001); Format: CD, digital download

=== Singles ===
List of singles, with selected chart positions
Year	Title	Chart positions	Certifications	Album
Year	Title	UK physical	Certifications	Album
2008	"Death Cloud"	50		Bliss Release
2009	"Gold Canary"	37		Bliss Release
2010	"This Is What I Said"	52		Bliss Release
2010	"There's Nothing In The Water We Can't Fight"	35	ARIA: Gold	Bliss Release
2010	"Meditation Song No. 2 (Why Oh Why)"	88		Bliss Release
2011	"My Fear #1"	—		Bliss Release
2013	"Dojo Rising"	—		Dream Cave
2013	"Scar"	—		Dream Cave
2013	"Promises"	—		Dream Cave
2014	"Moon Rabbit"	—		Dream Cave
2017	"Rainbow City"	—		Zone
2017	"Zone (This Is How It Feels)"	—		Zone
2017	"Treetops"	—		Zone
2018	"Panopticon"	—		Zone

== Awards and nominations ==
=== AIR Awards ===
The Australian Independent Record Awards (commonly known informally as AIR Awards) is an annual awards night to recognise, promote and celebrate the success of Australia's Independent Music sector.

Year	Nominee / work	Award	Result
2010	themselves	Best Independent Artist	Nominated
2010	themselves	Breakthrough Independent Artist	Won
2010	Bliss Release	Best Independent Album	Won

=== ARIA Music Awards ===
The ARIA Music Awards is an annual awards ceremony that recognises excellence, innovation, and achievement across all genres of Australian music. Cloud Control were nominated for two awards.

Year	Nominee / work	Award	Result
2010	Bliss Release	Breakthrough Artist	Nominated
2010	Bliss Release	Best Rock Album	Nominated

=== Australian Music Prize ===
The Australian Music Prize (the AMP) is an annual award of $30,000 given to an Australian band or solo artist in recognition of the merit of an album released during the year of award.

Year	Nominee / work	Award	Result
2010	Bliss Release	Australian Music Prize	Won
2013	Dream Cave	Australian Music Prize	Nominated

=== J Awards ===
The J Awards are an annual series of Australian music awards that were established by the Australian Broadcasting Corporation's youth-focused radio station Triple J.

Year	Nominee / work	Award	Result
2010	Bliss Release	Australian Album of the Year	Nominated
2013	Dream Cave	Australian Album of the Year	Nominated
