= Big Enough =

2017 single by Kirin J. Callinan

Single by Kirin J. Callinan featuring Alex Cameron, Molly Lewis, and Jimmy Barnes

from the album Bravado
- Released: 24 November 2017
- Recorded: 2017
- Genre: Country-EDM
- Length: 4:43
- Label: Terrible
- Songwriters: Kirin J. Callinan; Alex Cameron; Aaron Cupples

Music video
- "Big Enough" on YouTube

"Big Enough" is a song by Australian singer-songwriter Kirin J. Callinan featuring Australian singer Alex Cameron, Australian whistler Molly Lewis, and Scottish-Australian singer Jimmy Barnes. American record label Terrible Records released a music video on 16 August and the single on 24 November 2017. The song is featured on Callinan's album Bravado, released on 9 June 2017.

"Big Enough" is famous for Barnes' screaming, which has turned into an internet meme.

The song was written by Kirin J. Callinan, Alex Cameron, and Aaron Cupples, and was produced by Callinan and Cupples.

== Background ==
In an interview with Under the Radar, Callinan described his desire to include Barnes' famous screaming and receiving an email reply from Barnes containing only multiple audio files of said screaming.

Pedestrian describes "Big Enough" as a mixture of The Man from Snowy River, Brokeback Mountain, and the Spaghetti Western genre of films.

== Music video ==
The music video for "Big Enough" released alongside the single in August 2017. Directed by Danny Cohen, the video takes place in an old west environment. Callinan and Cameron play feuding cowboys who put aside their differences, accepting the world to be big enough "for all of us". Molly Lewis appears in the video whistling to the sky, where a screaming, translucent Jimmy Barnes appears.

== Internet meme ==
"Big Enough" became an internet meme by October 2017. The song features Barnes screaming, and the music video features him screaming in the sky. Many of the memes feature Barnes' image and vocals transplanted into various scenes in popular culture. Commenting on the recording of the track, Barnes simply stated he "screamed like a banshee for five minutes".

== Personnel ==
- Kirin J. Callinan – vocals, acoustic guitars, electric guitars, producer, writer
- Aaron Cupples – keys, choir synth, arrangements, programming, wind, producer, writer
- Alex Cameron – vocals, morals, ethics, writer
- Molly Lewis – whistle
- Jimmy Barnes – scream
- John Kirby – piano

== Nominations ==
Year	Awards	Category	Recipient	Outcome	Ref.
2017	J Awards	Australian Music Video of the Year	Danny Cohen	Nominated	
