= Bravado (album) =

Studio album by Kirin J. Callinan
- Released: 9 June 2017
- Recorded: 2017
- Length: 40:27
- Label: Terrible

Kirin J. Callinan chronology
Embracism (2013)	Bravado (2017)	Return to Center (2019)

Singles from Bravado
- 1. "Big Enough" Released: 24 November 2017

Bravado is the third studio album by Australian musician Kirin J. Callinan. The album was released by American record label Terrible Records on 9 June 2017.

== Background ==
The album was first announced on 26 April 2017, alongside a music video for "S.A.D.".

In an interview with Under the Radar, Callinan compared naming the album to making "a big empty statement", and that his ideas became "confusing and disorienting".

The cover of the album depicts Callinan urinating on himself.

== Reception ==
Andrew Street of The Guardian used the phrase "kidding on the square" to describe Callinan's music, while describing the album as dazzling. Anna Gaca, writing for Spin, called the album unusual.

Canadian magazine Exclaim!, however, critiqued that the album lost focus and compared the music to mashing keys on a keyboard.

== Track listing ==
No.	Title	Length
1.	"My Moment" (featuring Sean Nicholas Savage)	4:16
2.	"S.A.D."	3:38
3.	"Down 2 Hang" (featuring James Chance)	3:14
4.	"Living Each Day" (featuring Connan Mockasin)	4:00
5.	"Big Enough" (featuring Alex Cameron, Molly Lewis, and Jimmy Barnes)	4:43
6.	"Family Home" (featuring Finn Family)	4:59
7.	"Tellin' Me This" (featuring Jorge Elbrecht)	4:31
8.	"This Whole Town" (featuring Star)	3:10
9.	"Friend of Lindy Morrison" (featuring Weyes Blood)	4:03
10.	"Bravado"	3:53
Total length:		40:27

== Charts ==
Chart (2017)	Peak position
Australian Hitseekers Albums (ARIA)	5
