= Bliss Release =

Studio album by Cloud Control
- Released: 14 May 2010
- Genres: Folk, psychedelic
- Length: 46:46
- Label: Ivy League Records

Cloud Control chronology
| Cloud Control (2007) | Bliss Release (2010) | Dream Cave (2013) |

Singles from Bliss Release
- 1. "Death Cloud" Released: November 2008; 2. "Gold Canary" Released: 6 October 2009; 3. "This is what I Said" Released: April 2010; 4. "There's Nothing In The Water We Can't Fight" Released: July 2010; 5. "Meditation Song No. 2 (Why Oh Why)" Released: November 2010; 6. "My Fear #1" Released: February 2011

Bliss Release is the debut album by Australian band Cloud Control. The album was released in May 2010 and peaked at number 20 on the ARIA Charts.

At the ARIA Music Awards of 2010, the album was nominated for Breakthrough Artist - Release and Best Rock Album. At the J Awards of 2010, the album was nominated for Australian Album of the Year. At the AIR Awards of 2010, the album won Best Independent Album and Breakthrough Independent Artist. In 2011, the album won the Australian Music Prize.

== Reception ==
Professional ratings
Review scores
| Source | Rating |
|---|---|
| J Mag | 4/5 stars |
| The Australian | 4/5 stars |
| Clash | 8/10 stars |
| The Age | 4/5 stars |
| The Sydney Morning Herald | 4/5 stars |

The Age said "The buzz around Cloud Control is entirely warranted – expect big things from this four-piece"

The Sydney Morning Herald said "Let's be frank, a bloody impressive album".

== Track listing ==
All tracks are written by Cloud Control.

Standard edition
| No. | Title | Length |
|---|---|---|
| 1. | "Meditation Song #2 (Why, Oh Why)" | 4:13 |
| 2. | "There's Nothing In The Water We Can't Fight" | 3:59 |
| 3. | "Ghost Story" | 4:17 |
| 4. | "Gold Canary" | 3:55 |
| 5. | "This Is What I Said" | 3:39 |
| 6. | "Just for Now" (part of the Soundtrack for the 2012 film Magic Mike) | 3:58 |
| 7. | "The Rolling Stones" | 4:14 |
| 8. | "Hollow Drums" | 3:00 |
| 9. | "My Fear #2" | 3:45 |
| 10. | "Beast of Love" | 3:45 |
| 11. | "Death Cloud" (bonus track) | 4:16 |
| 12. | "My Fear #1" (demo) | 3:39 |
| Total length: | | 46:46 |

2×CD 2011 Deluxe edition
| No. | Title | Length |
|---|---|---|
| 1. | "My Fear #1" | 3:44 |
| 2. | "Island" | 3:29 |
| 3. | "This Is What Yo Mama Said" (Fishing remix) | 3:18 |
| 4. | "Gold Canary" (Seekae Remix remix) | 3:52 |
| 5. | "Gold Canary" (DJ Animals remix) | 2:17 |
| 6. | "There's Nothing in the Water We Can't Fight" (Spod remix) | 3:45 |
| 7. | "Pursuit of Happiness" (FBI Radio Sydney Live Recording) | 2:40 |

UK 2011 edition
| No. | Title | Length |
|---|---|---|
| 1. | "Meditation Song #2 (Why, Oh Why)" | 4:13 |
| 2. | "There's Nothing in the Water We Can't Fight" | 3:59 |
| 3. | "Death Cloud" (UK album version) | 3:56 |
| 4. | "Ghost Story" | 4:17 |
| 5. | "Gold Canary" | 3:53 |
| 6. | "This Is What I Said" | 3:39 |
| 7. | "Just For Now" | 3:58 |
| 8. | "The Rolling Stones" | 4:10 |
| 9. | "Hollow Drums" | 3:00 |
| 10. | "My Fear #1" (UK album version) | 3:31 |
| Total length: | | 38:49 |

== Charts ==
| Chart (2010) | Peak position |
|---|---|
| Australian Albums (ARIA) | 20 |

| Chart (2025) | Peak position |
|---|---|
| Australian Albums (ARIA) | 19 |

== Personnel ==
- Alister Wright – lead vocals, rhythm guitar
- Heidi Lenffer – vocals, keyboards
- Ulrich Lenffer – drums, percussion
- Jeremy Kelshaw – vocals, bass guitar

== Release history ==
| Region | Date | Format | Label | Catalogue |
|---|---|---|---|---|
| Australia | 14 May 2010 | CD, digital | Ivy League Records | IVY090 / IVY094 |
| Australia | March 2011 | 2×CD, digital | Ivy League Records | IVY109 |
| United Kingdom / North America | May 2011 | LP, CD, digital | Infectious Records | INFECT127LP / INFECT127CD |
| Australia | May 2025 | LP (15th Anniversary Edition) | Mushroom Records | MUSH012LP1 |
