= Lost Valentinos =

Australian musical group

- Origin: Sydney, New South Wales, Australia
- Genres: Indie rock, psychedelic rock, dance-punk, synth-pop
- Labels: etcetc Universal Music Australia
- Members: Nik Yiannikas; Pat Santamaria; Andrew Santamaria; Jono Ma
- Past members: Daniel Stricker; Kirin J Callinan
- Website: Official Website; MySpace Page

Lost Valentinos are an Australian indie rock band from Sydney. They released two EPs under the band name The Valentinos but changed their name in mid-2007 to Lost Valentinos due to the threat of legal action by soul artists from the 1950s, Bobby Womack & The Valentinos. Lost Valentinos have been described by NME as "A skittering shitstorm of punk fury, disco beats and psychedelic excursions, the sonic invention of M83, Can and My Bloody Valentine melding with the panty-poking fun of Wham!, The Pixies and The Human League."

== History ==
The band's eponymous debut EP, The Valentinos, produced by Kim Moyes of The Presets was released in 2005 and featured Midnight Juggernauts's Daniel Stricker and a young Kirin J. Callinan (credited as Kieran Callinan), of Mercy Arms, on guitar. The EP's original pressing sold out in its first week of release. Their first single "Man with a Gun" received heavy rotation on Triple J.

Their second EP, Damn And Damn Again, was produced by Nick Littlemore of PNAU and was mastered in New York by Greg Calbi, who has worked with the likes of Blondie, Sonic Youth and The Strokes. By this stage Jono Ma had replaced Kirin J Callinan. Upon meeting, the two guitarists began working together and would later go on to be founding members of the improvisational collective F.L.R.L.

The band, now Lost Valentinos, released their third EP Miles From Nowhere in 2007.

They released their debut album, Cities of Gold, on 9 September 2009. It was recorded during 2008 and 2009 in Sydney, London, and Berlin. The album was produced by Ewan Pearson, who has worked with bands such as Chemical Brothers and The Rapture. Four singles were released from the album: "The Bismarck", "Serio", "Midnights", and "Thief".

== Members ==
- Jono Ma – guitar, keyboards
- Andrew Santamaria – guitar
- Patrick Santamaria – bass guitar
- Nik Yiannikas – vocals
- Simon Parker – drums

=== Former members ===
- Daniel Stricker (Midnight Juggernauts) – drums
- Kirin J Callinan (Mercy Arms, The Dreamlanders) – guitar, keyboards
- Leon Rogovoy – keyboards
- Liam Bramall – guitar
- Craig Whitaker – drums
- Jonathan Martin – bass guitar
- Loryn Garnsey – drums

== Discography ==
=== Albums ===
- Cities of Gold (2009)

=== EPs ===
- The Valentinos (2005)
- Damn & Damn Again (2006)
- Miles from Nowhere (2007)

=== Singles ===
- "Man with the Gun" (2005)
- "Rain" (2006)
- "17 Deaths" (2007)
- "The Bismarck" (2008)
- "Serio" (2009)
- "Midnights" (2009)
- "Thief" (2009)

== Touring ==
- Toured with The Presets in 2005
- Headline tour with the UK's Johnny Boy in 2006
- Slots at Parklife Festival, Splendour in the Grass, Falls Festival, V Festival and the Playground Weekender Festival
- Toured with The Church on their national tour in 2006
- Toured to the UK and Japan and 2006
- Toured with Datarock in Australia in 2006
- Toured with Soulwax in Australia, March/April 2007
- V festival tour, March/April 2007
- "17 Deaths" Single Tour in Australia, July 2007
- Played at Splendour in the Grass in August 2007 alongside bands such as Arctic Monkeys and Bloc Party
- Toured with Van She in Australia, September 2008
- Bacardi Express Tour '09 w/ Groove Armada, British India, Bluejuice, Van She, Beardyman, and Hoops DJs.
