= Kirin J. Callinan =

Australian musician

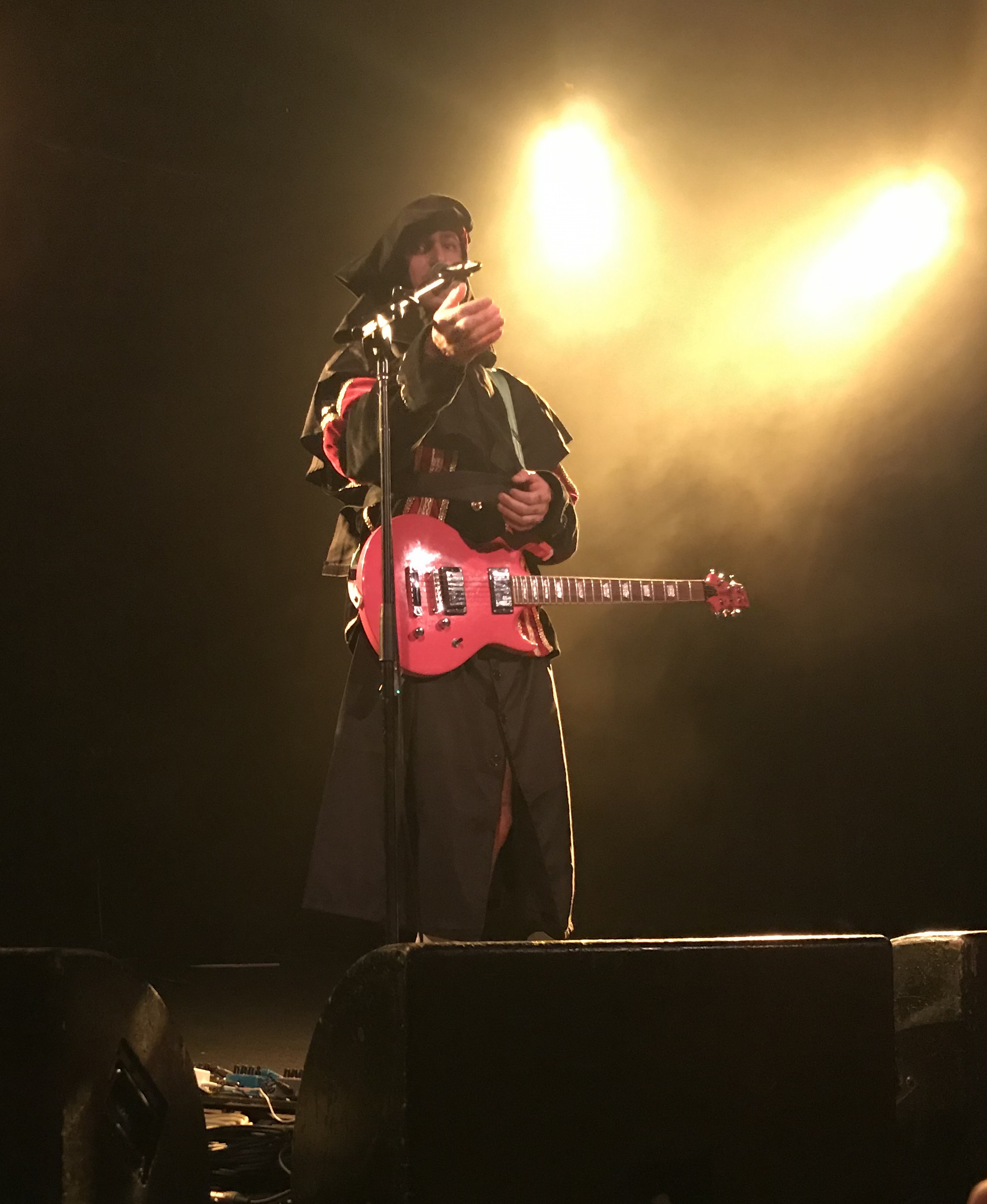
- Callinan performing live in Sydney, August 2019

Background information
- Born: Kieran John Callinan; 21 January 1986 (age 40); Sydney, New South Wales, Australia
- Genres: Glam rock; art pop; indie rock; dance-pop; EDM; experimental rock; post-punk
- Occupations: Musician; actor
- Instruments: Vocals; guitar; synthesiser; bass guitar; percussion; piano
- Years active: 2005–present
- Labels: Siberia; Terrible; XL Recordings; EMI; Caroline
- Formerly of: Mercy Arms; The Night Game; Jack Ladder and the Dreamlanders

Kieran John Callinan (born 21 January 1986), known by his stage name Kirin J. Callinan, is an Australian singer, songwriter, comedian and guitarist. He is also a founding member of Mercy Arms and has played with the Night Game, Jack Ladder and the Dreamlanders, Mark Ronson and Genesis Owusu.

Referred to as the enfant terrible of Australia's underground rock music scene, Callinan is known for his flamboyant public persona, confrontational live shows, and diverse musical output in which, according to Spin, "the distinctions between no talent, irony, and genuine bad taste bleed together until they're indistinguishable." Callinan said that his primary motivation as a musician is to "to get worldwide attention."

Callinan has collaborated with a wide range of musicians, including Mark Ronson, Jimmy Barnes, James Chance, Alex Cameron, Connan Mockasin, Caroline Polachek, Weyes Blood, Pond, Kim Dracula, Mac Demarco, Martin Johnson, Ariel Pink, Hubert Lenoir, Julian Casablancas, Genesis Owusu, whistler Molly Lewis and brothers Neil and Tim Finn. Barnes, Cameron and Lewis feature in Callinan's 2017 single "Big Enough"; Barnes' distinctive screaming cameo became an internet meme.

== Early life ==
Kieran John Callinan was born and raised in Sydney. His father is Brendan Callinan, former keyboardist with Australian pub rock band The Radiators. Callinan attended Barrenjoey High School located in the Northern Beaches of Sydney and was elected School Captain in his final year of school.

== Music career ==
=== 2005–2007: Early years and Mercy Arms ===
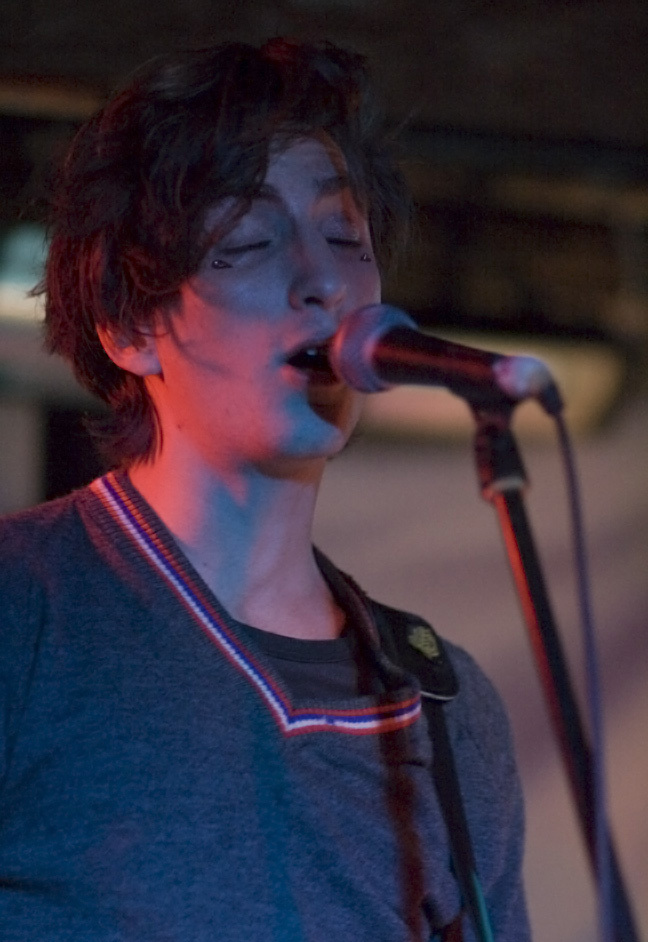
Callinan playing live with Mercy Arms, Melbourne, May 2008

In 2005, he formed indie rock band Mercy Arms with fellow guitarist and vocalist Thom Moore, bassist Ash Moss, and drummer Julian Sudek. Callinan and Sudek had lived in the same area: "We played soccer against each other and with each other as kids, so we go back to when we were fourteen years old or so." Mercy Arms broke up in 2009, on stage at the Perth Big Day Out.

Kirin was also an early member of Sydney post punk band The Valentinos, their first ep produced by later Kirin J collaborator and Embracism producer Kim Moyes of The Presets.

=== 2008–present: Solo career ===
In 2008, Callinan self-released his debut solo album, Am I a Woman, Yet?. His second album, Embracism, was released by American record label Terrible Records and London based XL Recordings in 2013.

Beginning in 2016, Callinan began recording and performing with The Night Game, a rock band with Martin Johnson.

In 2017, Callinan released Bravado. It reached No. 5 on the ARIA Hitseekers Albums Chart. His track, "S.A.D.", was provided with a music video directed by Danny Cohen, which was nominated for Best Video at the ARIA Music Awards of 2017.

In February 2018, Callinan received a 12-month good-behaviour bond after being charged with willful and obscene exposure in a public place. He lifted his kilt on the red carpet at the ARIA Music Awards of 2017, briefly exposing his genitals to press photographers. Following the incident, Callinan was dropped from the 2018 lineup of Laneway Music Festival and as of 2024 he has not appeared on a major festival lineup in Australia since.

In 2019, Callinan released Return to Center. Writing for the Sydney Morning Herald, music journalist Michael Dwyer wrote that "Kirin J Callinan has just purloined the concept album of the century".

Callinan has contributed and collaborated both live and on record with a number of other artists. Since 2009 he has been an original touring member of Jack Ladder & the Dreamlanders, contributing guitars on the 2009 live EP Counterfeits as well as full-length albums Hurtsville (2011), Playmates (2014), Blue Poles (2018) and 2021's Hijack!. He also played guitars on Mark Ronson's Grammy Award-winning album Uptown Special, performing songs from the album including lead singles "Uptown Funk" and "Leaving Los Feliz" live alongside Ronson and Tame Impala's Kevin Parker.

2019 saw Callinan co-writing and producing songs in a production duo alongside Mac Demarco, producing Julian Casablancas & The Voidz' singles "Did My Best" and "The Eternal Tao 2.0" and working on Hubert Lenoir's second LP Pictura de Ipse: Musique Direct among others.

Back in Australia, Callinan also begun working alongside Australian-Ghanaian rapper Genesis Owusu, co-writing 2021's Smiling with No Teeth album, contributing vocals and guitar. Smiling with No Teeth would go on to win Album of the Year, Best Hip Hop Release, and Best Independent Release at the 2021 ARIA Awards as well as the J Award for Australian Album of the Year, and in March 2022, the Australian Music Prize.

In 2021, Callinan launched his own record label, Worse Records – a subsidiary of US label Terrible Records, releasing French Canadian artist Hubert Lenoir's 2022 Polaris Prize shortlisted second album Pictura de Ipse: Musique Direct as well as one-off single "New Music Friday", by his own manufactured conceptual boy band "Seconds Flat" and Jack Ladder & the Dreamlanders' lead single "Astronaut" from the album Hijack!.

On Valentine's Day, 14 February 2022, Kirin released the first single "...In Absolutes" and its accompanying music video co-directed with Kiwi director Oscar Keys, apparently shot in Callinan's New Zealand residence.

In July 2023, Callinan appeared on Kim Dracula's debut album A Gradual Decline In Morale featuring on the song "Are You?"

In October 2023, Callinan released "Eternally Hateful" and announced his fifth studio album If I Could Sing.

== Acting ==
In 2017, Callinan was cast by Jane Campion in the second season of Top of the Lake. "Kirin was a joy to work with because he was imaginative, playful and exploring," said Campion. "He seems somehow to push the limits of human being in the biggest sense, like he might have been raised by unicorns."

== Discography ==
=== Albums ===
Title	Details
Am I a Woman, Yet?	Released: 2008; Label: Kirin J Callinan; Format: CD, digital download
Embracism	Released: 24 June 2013; Label: Siberia (SIB011CD); Format: CD, LP, digital download
Bravado	Released: 9 June 2017; Label: Siberia, Terrible, EMI (5735778); Format: CD, LP, digital download
Return to Center	Released: 17 June 2019; Label: Terrible, EMI (7766194); Format: CD, LP, digital download
If I Could Sing	Released: 2 February 2024; Label: Worse Records; Format:

== Backing band ==
Current

- Jack Ladder – theremin (2021–present)

Former

- Tex Crick – synthesizer, bass guitar, backing vocals (2013–2020)
- Mahne Frame – drums, percussion, backing vocals (2016–2020)
- John Carroll Kirby – keyboards (2018)
- David Jenkins Jnr. – drums, percussion (2013–2016)
- Daniel Stricker – drums (2007–2012)
- Hannes Kaschell – drums (2015)
- Tim Koh – bass guitar (2015)
- Jaie Gonzales – bass guitar (2013–2014)
- Molly Lewis – whistling (2017)

== Awards ==
=== AIR Awards ===
The Australian Independent Record Awards (commonly known informally as AIR Awards) is an annual awards night to recognise, promote and celebrate the success of Australia's Independent Music sector.

Year	Nominee / work	Award	Result
2013	themselves	Breakthrough Independent Artist	Nominated

=== ARIA Music Awards ===
The ARIA Music Awards is an annual awards ceremony that recognises excellence, innovation, and achievement across all genres of Australian music.

Year	Nominee / work	Award	Result	Ref.
2017	"S.A.D." (directed by Danny Cohen)	Best Video	Nominated	

=== Australian Music Prize ===
The Australian Music Prize (the AMP) is an annual award of $30,000 given to an Australian band or solo artist in recognition of the merit of an album released during the year of award. The commenced in 2005.

Year	Nominee / work	Award	Result
2013	Embracism	Australian Music Prize	Nominated

=== J Award ===
The J Awards are an annual series of Australian music awards that were established by the Australian Broadcasting Corporation's youth-focused radio station Triple J. They commenced in 2005.

Year	Nominee / work	Award	Result
2012	"Way II War"	Australian Video of the Year	Won
2017	"Big Enough"	Australian Video of the Year	Nominated

=== National Live Music Awards ===
The National Live Music Awards (NLMAs) are a broad recognition of Australia's diverse live industry, celebrating the success of the Australian live scene. The awards commenced in 2016.

Year	Nominee / work	Award	Result
2016	Kirin J. Callinan	Live Guitarist of the Year	Nominated
