= Tell Em =

Tell Em or Tell 'Em may refer to:

- "Tell Em" (Cochise and Snot song), 2021
- "Tell 'Em" (Sleigh Bells song), 2010
- "Tell Em", 2019 song by American singer Sabrina Carpenter, on her album Singular: Act II

== See also ==
- "Tell Them", a song by James Blake from his 2019 album Assume Form
