= Jessica Rabbit (disambiguation) =

Jessica Rabbit is a fictional character from the Roger Rabbit film-and-novel franchise.

Jessica Rabbit may also refer to:

- Jessica Rabbit (album), a 2016 album by Sleigh Bells
- Rabbit vibrator also known as Jessica Rabbit vibrator, a sex toy
- Melyssa Ford (born 1976), Canadian model, often referred to as Jessica Rabbit

== See also ==
- Jessica (given name)
- Rabbit
