= Comeback Kid (Sleigh Bells song) =

Single by Sleigh Bells

from the album Reign of Terror
- Released: January 17, 2012
- Genre: Noise pop
- Length: 3:00
- Label: Mom+Pop
- Songwriter: Sleigh Bells
- Producer: Derek E. Miller

Sleigh Bells singles chronology
"Riot Rhythm" (2011)	"Comeback Kid" (2012)	"Bitter Rivals" (2013)

Music video
- "Comeback Kid" on YouTube

"Comeback Kid" is a song written and performed by noise pop duo Sleigh Bells, issued as the official lead single for their second album Reign of Terror (following the promotional single "Born to Lose"). The song was released January 17, 2012. On February 18, the band performed the song on Saturday Night Live.

== Music video ==
The music video was directed by Miller and Gregory Kohn. It was filmed in Jupiter, Florida, Miller's home town. Scenes were shot in his old neighborhood, his mother's room and a local grocery store.

== Critical reception ==
The song has received positive reviews from critics. Billboard described the song as "a bizarrely catchy track". Greg Kot of the Chicago Tribune positively compared the song to songs from the band's debut album Treats, stating that "the production is more refined" and has "a more spacious arrangement".
