= Texis =

Studio album by Sleigh Bells
- Released: September 10, 2021
- Studios: The Bayou (Kingston); Catskill Casa (New York); The Creamery (Brooklyn)
- Genres: Noise pop; electropop; industrial rock
- Length: 35:19
- Label: Mom + Pop
- Producers: Alexis Krauss; Derek E. Miller

Sleigh Bells chronology
| Kid Kruschev (2017) | Texis (2021) | Bunky Becky Birthday Boy (2025) |

Professional ratings
Aggregate scores
| Source | Rating |
|---|---|
| Metacritic | 73/100 |
Review scores
| Source | Rating |
| AllMusic | 3.5/5 stars |
| Beats Per Minute | 71% |
| DIY | 4/5 stars |
| The Line of Best Fit | 8/10 |
| MusicOMH | 3.5/5 stars |
| NME | 4/5 stars |
| Paste | 8.2/10 |
| Pitchfork | 6.1/10 |
| Sputnikmusic | 4.5/5 |
| Under the Radar | 7/10 stars |

Texis is the fifth studio album by American noise pop duo Sleigh Bells. The title is an anagram of "exits," which refers to bandmember Derek Miller's feelings at the time that he would not survive substance abuse.

== Track listing ==
All tracks are written by Alexis Krauss and Derek Miller.

Texis track listing
| No. | Title | Length |
|---|---|---|
| 1. | "SWEET75" | 3:32 |
| 2. | "An Acre Lost" | 3:26 |
| 3. | "I'm Not Down" | 3:18 |
| 4. | "Locust Laced" | 2:30 |
| 5. | "Knowing" | 3:11 |
| 6. | "Justine Go Genesis" | 3:16 |
| 7. | "Tennessee Tips" | 2:43 |
| 8. | "Rosary" | 3:38 |
| 9. | "Red Flag Flies" | 3:05 |
| 10. | "True Seekers" | 3:26 |
| 11. | "Hummingbird Bomb" | 3:14 |
| Total length: | | 35:19 |

== Personnel ==
Credits adapted from the album's liner notes.

=== Sleigh Bells ===
- Alexis Krauss – vocals, production, recording
- Derek Miller – beats, drums, percussion, guitars, synthesizers, bass, production, recording, artwork, collage, design, layout

=== Additional contributors ===
- Andrew Dawson – mixing
- Joe LaPorta – mastering
- Jeff Fettig – backing vocals recording
- Jessica Wagner – backing vocals (tracks 1, 4, 6–8, 11)
- Tania Jones – backing vocals (tracks 1, 4, 6–8, 11)
- Sara Devine – backing vocals (tracks 1, 4, 6–8, 11)
- Will Hubbard – design, layout
- Chris Vultaggio – photography
