= Reign of Terror (Sleigh Bells album) =

Studio album by Sleigh Bells
- Released: February 21, 2012
- Recorded: June 25 – October 31, 2011
- Genres: Noise pop; pop metal
- Length: 36:24
- Label: Mom+Pop
- Producer: Derek E. Miller

Sleigh Bells chronology
Treats (2010)	Reign of Terror (2012)	Bitter Rivals (2013)

Singles from Reign of Terror
- 1. "Comeback Kid" Released: January 17, 2012

Reign of Terror is the second studio album by American noise pop duo Sleigh Bells. The album was released on February 21, 2012 by Mom+Pop.

Following the critical success of their debut album Treats, Sleigh Bells started writing new material for their next album while on tour for their debut album, and recorded it over the course of five months in 2011. Reign of Terror placed more emphasis on pop structures, guitar, and emotionally heavy lyrics than their overdriven, sample-heavy debut.

The album received a generally positive reception from critics. Reign of Terror debuted at number 12 on the Billboard 200 and spawned only one single: "Comeback Kid". To promote the album, Sleigh Bells toured across North America and Europe.

== Writing and recording ==
The writing process for Reign of Terror began during the touring cycle for Sleigh Bells' debut album Treats in 2010. The song writing for Reign of Terror was a more collaborative effort between group members Derek E. Miller and Alexis Krauss, as the majority of the songs on Treats were written solely by Miller before Krauss joined the group. Krauss' musical background is primarily in pop music, and her contributions to the album included pop song structures such as bridges, counter-melodies and pre-choruses. In addition to traditional pop music song structures, Reign of Terror also features a more guitar-centered sound. According to Miller, "With Treats it was less clear to me whether Sleigh Bells was going to be a guitar band or if we were going to do more sample-heavy stuff. With this record I had to pick sides. The beats are still important to me, but the guitar won." Sleigh Bells also described the album as being heavy, immense, and huge, and a press release described it as "the sonic equivalent of a beautiful shotgun to the head." Lyrically, Reign of Terror features songs that are emotionally heavy, differing from the songs on Treats which were described as "party music" by Miller.

Sleigh Bells were rushed during the production of Treats and were unable to finish recording all of the songs they had written before they had to leave the studio to perform at scheduled tour dates. Not wanting to repeat this mistake, the duo set aside a lot of time in 2011 to record and produce Reign of Terror. Recording began on June 25, 2011 at SMT Studios in Manhattan, New York. The album was produced by Miller and engineered by Shane Stoneback, who also worked with Sleigh Bells on Treats. At SMT, Miller recorded his guitar parts in a reverberation room to achieve a "massive Def Leppard-influenced guitar sound." Sleigh Bells also recorded a group of their friends stomping and clapping in the bleachers of a high school gym for the song "Crush" and other songs.

The album starts with cheering and what seems to be Krauss speaking at a live performance, although the recording was created in the studio. Krauss explained that "we wanted to create something that was really anthemic, and for it to sound like we recorded it in an arena...we just wanted to come in with something really bombastic, something that was announcing our return, something that was confident and a bit playful for sure." Miller told Westword that "if you don't start cracking up when you hear the stadium crowd fade in, then we're not doing our job. It's supposed to be funny. It's such an ambitious, arrogant, tasteless way to start a record, but if you know that there's a wink and a nudge with it, I think it works perfectly. We actually did a test because we didn't know if we wanted to start the record that way, so we just brought in a bunch of different friends separately. After the fifth or sixth one started cracking up within the first ten seconds, we knew that we had it."

Less than two months after the release of Reign of Terror, Sleigh Bells already began writing a follow-up album. "[Reign of Terror] made me feel like we had so much more to do. I definitely didn't hear it and think, 'Okay, I'm satisfied.' I heard it and I thought, 'We didn't have to stop recording—we could do this, this, and this, right now.' So I feel like we made a very good record, but I want very much to continue to the next phase of our development," Krauss said. A few unused demos and ideas from the Reign of Terror sessions, such as the instrumental track used in the album's trailer, could become part of the band's third studio album.

== Artwork ==
The cover art for Reign of Terror features a dirty, bloody pair of white Keds shoes. The pair of shoes belongs to Krauss and least some of the blood shown in the picture is hers too. During a live performance, Miller hit Krauss in the head with his guitar and some of the blood from the incident landed on her shoes, but the image was also "doctored up" after-the-fact for effect. According to Miller, the cover represents both band members. Krauss ritually wears a pair of white Keds for every performance, and Miller noted, "If Keds are a symbol of youth and purity, having them tainted can be seen as a loss of innocence; a lot of life has happened to me in a very, very short period of time."

The remaining images in the album's liner notes are all related to Miller's family history—namely, a number of war relics from his grandparents. Most of the imagery is also a reflection of Miller's difficult year preceding the album. "Reign of Terror is mainly about internal conflict and—this is kind of corny—I was definitely at war with myself," Miller said. The image of the Purple Heart, also used as the cover art for the promotional single "Born to Lose", was awarded to Miller's grandfather for being wounded in World War II. The medal also loosely relates to the passing of his father. "It was just a really terrible, painful experience and of course a Purple Heart is something you receive after you are wounded in service. I'm not drawing a direct comparison, but the thought occurred to me," Miller said. His grandfather was shot in the leg during the war, but the bullet first traveled through his canteen. This canteen seen with the bullet hole, along with the American flag he was awarded, are also featured in Reign of Terror's liner notes. One picture that was featured in the album's liner notes that isn't a war relic is a photograph of a burning sugar cane field, which also serves as the cover art for the "Comeback Kid" single. This image is meant to represent Miller's father who used to work as a sugar cane farmer.

== Promotion ==
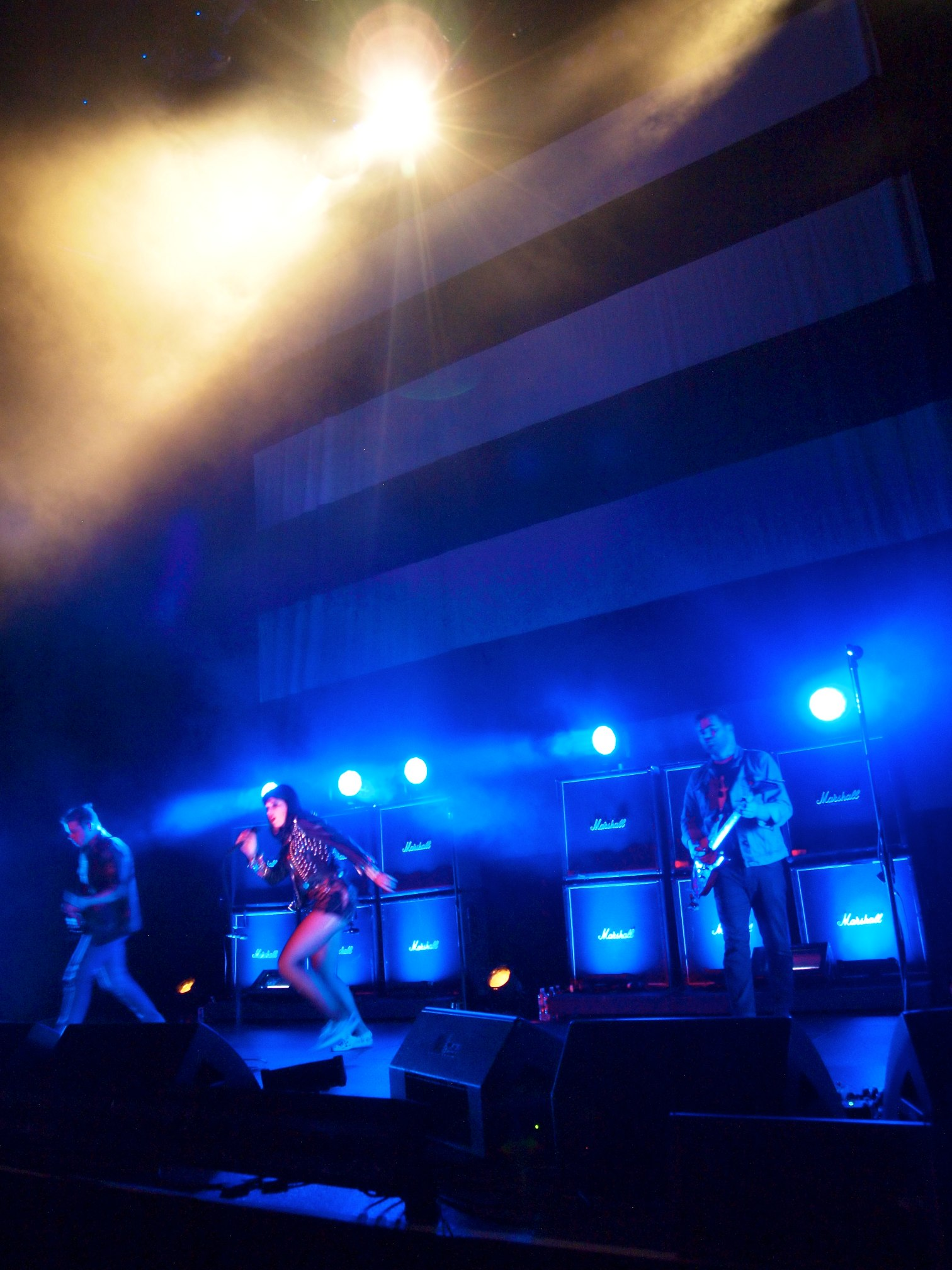
Left-to-right: Derek Miller, Alexis Krauss and Jason Boyer performing at SXSW.

On December 2, 2011 Sleigh Bells posted a trailer for Reign of Terror on their official website. The video was a compilation of various clips including Alexis Krauss sitting at a vanity mirror brushing her hair, live performances of Sleigh Bells and home videos of the group in the studio. The instrumental guitar track for the trailer was an unused demo from the Reign of Terror sessions.

The promotional single "Born to Lose" was available for streaming online on December 15, 2011. The first official single from Reign of Terror, "Comeback Kid", was released as a free download from iTunes for those who pre-order the full album, and as a stand-alone download on January 17, 2012. The music video for "Comeback Kid" was filmed in Derek Miller's home town of Jupiter, Florida. Scenes were shot in Miller's old neighborhood, his mom's room and the local grocery store.

A music video for "Demons" was released in May 2012. The video was directed by Gregory Kohn and instrumentalist Derek Miller, and features live footage of Sleigh Bells performing in various cities that was inspired by Pantera music videos. The video includes footage from the band’s concerts in Omaha, Oklahoma City, Dallas and Houston. A remix of "Demons" by the band’s tourmate Diplo was released the same day. In August 2012, a music video co-directed by Kohn and Miller for "End of the Line" was released.

Leading up to Reign of Terror's release date, Sleigh Bells went on an eight-day mini-tour of Florida with the DJ Diplo and the black metal band Liturgy. The idea for a tour exclusively in Florida came to Miller and Diplo while the two were in Brooklyn, New York. About this tour, Miller said, "Not a lot of bands come down to Florida, but it's a strange place and something about it felt right." On February 18, 2012, Sleigh Bells was the musical guest on Saturday Night Live, and performed "Comeback Kid" and "End of the Line." Following a short tour opening for Red Hot Chili Peppers, Sleigh Bells will tour North America with the synthpop group Class Actress and the rapper Jel in July 2012. In August 2012, Sleigh Bells headlined Europe, toured the US West Coast with the hardcore punk band Refused, then announced a September–November 2012 tour with DJ AraabMuzik.

The stage production for early tours in support of Reign of Terror was described by Miller as being, "so dark that it's hard to see the crowd." The stage set-up consisted simply of a black-and-white American flag backdrop and a wall of stacked Marshall amplifiers. Susan Shepard of Rolling Stone, Mario Tarradell of The Dallas Morning News and Harley Brown of Consequence of Sound all described the stage set-up as being "minimal", with the latter also describing the flag as being "ostentatious". Because the songs on Reign of Terror have more guitar harmonies than previous releases, Sleigh Bells employed Jason Boyer as a backing touring guitarist for live performances. Miller also liked the symmetry of having two guitarists on both sides of a vocalist.

== Reception ==
=== Critical ===
Professional ratings
Aggregate scores
Source	Rating
Metacritic	77/100
Review scores
Source	Rating
AllMusic	3.5/5 stars
Alternative Press	2.5/5 stars
Consequence of Sound	4.5/5 stars
The Guardian	2/5 stars
MSN Music (Expert Witness)	A−
NME	8/10
Paste	6.7/10
Pitchfork	8.2/10
Rolling Stone	4/5 stars
Slant Magazine	4/5 stars

Prior to the album's release, several publications listed Reign of Terror as an anticipated release for the first part of 2012 including Spin, Time, Metacritic and NPR. At Metacritic, which assigns a normalized rating out of 100 to reviews from mainstream critics, the album received an average score of 77 based on 38 reviews, which indicates "generally favorable reviews".

Rob Sheffield of Rolling Stone noted that the duo make tweaks to well-known rock genres from different eras in their tracks, saying that they "bring a proudly aggressive sass to all the heavily treated guitars – now that they've proven they can get away with such a massive sound, they're out to see what tricks they can do with it." Priya Elan of NME praised the different styles the duo delve into that recall dark films and gothic music, concluding that, "[T]he way they’ve leapfrogged their contemporaries in terms of ambition and scope is terrifying. Sleigh Bells are, once again, in a league of their own." Matthew Cole of Slant Magazine praised the duo for following their debut with a more amplified continuation of the formula they set themselves, saying that "they've met the sophomore slump head-on, fists and guitars raised, and made something like a respectable pop album."

AllMusic's Heather Phares said that while Miller and Krauss increased the qualities that made their debut a success with a polished sheen, she felt that the metal elements become unbalanced when the guitar riffs get louder, concluding that "Reign of Terror ends up being a fatiguing reminder of how remarkable a feat Treats was. Sleigh Bells may have topped themselves here, but it's a case of more being less." Dan Weiss of Paste noted that the album lacked the hip-hop element their debut had that gave those songs energy along with the metal elements, concluding that "Reign of Terror plays like a band with original ideas who got stuck in quicksand."

Michael Hann of The Guardian felt that the album was compressed with its songs' production lacking energy, concluding that "they're not actually noisy per se, merely uninterested in restraint, which is a rather different thing." Scott Heisel of Alternative Press felt that the album was a disappointment, criticizing the nondescript production, lyrical framing of the songs and Krauss' forgettable lyrics, concluding that "Unlike Treats, Reign of Terror never feels new, fresh or exciting; it just feels like a chore."

The album was listed 24th on Stereogum's list of top 50 albums of 2012.

=== Commercial ===
Reign of Terror was anticipated to sell 30,000 copies in the first week and landed at number six on Nielsen SoundScan's Building Chart—a chart that ranks album sales based on the first four days of release (opposing the first seven as is done with the Billboard 200) and is only based on sales from major retailers. The album debuted at number 12 in the Billboard 200, significantly higher than Treats, which peaked at number 39. However, the album descended to number 78 in the second week with sales falling to around 8,000 copies—a 72% drop.

== Track listing ==
All lyrics are written by Alexis Krauss and Derek Miller.

No.	Title	Length
1.	"True Shred Guitar"	2:20
2.	"Born to Lose"	3:53
3.	"Crush"	3:19
4.	"End of the Line"	3:38
5.	"Leader of the Pack"	2:43
6.	"Comeback Kid"	3:00
7.	"Demons"	3:03
8.	"Road to Hell"	3:21
9.	"You Lost Me"	4:30
10.	"Never Say Die"	3:40
11.	"D.O.A."	2:57

== Personnel ==
Reign of Terror album personnel adapted from liner notes.

Sleigh Bells

- Alexis Krauss – vocals
- Derek Miller – all instruments

Production

- Derek Miller – production
- Shane Stoneback – mixing, engineering
- Ryan Primack – assistant engineer
- Steve Fallone – mastering

Artwork

- Derek Miller – art direction
- Steve Attardo – layout, design
- Joe Garrad – photography

== Charts ==
Chart (2012)	Peak position
Australian Albums (ARIA)	33
Belgian Heatseekers Albums (Ultratop Flanders)	13
Canadian Albums (Billboard)	35
Irish Albums (IRMA)	64
UK Albums (Official Charts)	48
US Billboard 200	12
US Independent Albums (Billboard)	1
US Top Alternative Albums (Billboard)	2
US Top Rock Albums (Billboard)	3
