= Bitter Rivals =

Studio album by Sleigh Bells
- Released: October 4, 2013
- Recorded: Treefort Studios (Brooklyn, New York City)
- Genre: Noise pop; electropop
- Length: 29:26
- Label: Mom + Pop
- Producer: Will Hubbard; Derek Miller; Shane Stoneback

Sleigh Bells chronology
| Reign of Terror (2012) | Bitter Rivals (2013) | Jessica Rabbit (2016) |

Singles from Bitter Rivals
- 1. "Bitter Rivals" Released: September 3, 2013

Bitter Rivals is the third studio album by American noise pop duo Sleigh Bells. It was released on October 4, 2013, by Mom + Pop Music. The title track was released as the album's lead single on September 3, 2013, with a music video released the day before. The album was made exclusively available for streaming on Rolling Stone's website on October 1, 2013. It was partially inspired by Janet Jackson, with the song "Tiger Kit" referencing Jackson's "Rhythm Nation".

== Composition ==
=== Music and lyrics ===
Philip Cosores of Consequence of Sound described Alexis Kraus' vocals on the record as leaning "heavily" on the "hip-hop cadence" of Sleigh Bells' previous albums "to go along with [Kraus'] inked-up bubblegum melodies". Cosores also described the album's musical styles as nostalgic, featuring "nu metal serving as a warning for pop punk, and freestyle, and whatever else might next resurface".

== Critical reception ==
Professional ratings
Aggregate scores
| Source | Rating |
|---|---|
| Metacritic | 70/100 |
Review scores
| Source | Rating |
| AllMusic | 3.5/5 stars |
| The A.V. Club | B |
| Consequence of Sound | D− |
| Entertainment Weekly | A− |
| The Guardian | 3/5 stars |
| NME | 7/10 |
| Pitchfork | 5.9/10 |
| PopMatters | 7/10 |
| Rolling Stone | 3.5/5 stars |
| Spin | 8/10 |

At Metacritic, which assigns a normalized rating out of 100 to reviews from mainstream critics, the album received an average score of 70 based on 27 reviews, which indicates "generally favorable reviews".

Philip Cosores of Consequence of Sound compared the album to nu metal bands such as Korn, Limp Bizkit, and Staind, who all had "a similar pattern of three albums into the spotlight, [with] their third being a success in terms of attention, but also a signifier of the end of people caring in quite the same way". Cosores also felt that the album played to Sleigh Bells' strength, but mostly felt "stuck in the weaker aspects of their previous albums, busying up the mercifully brief tracks with unnecessary filler".

== Track listing ==
All lyrics are written by Sleigh Bells.

| No. | Title | Length |
|---|---|---|
| 1. | "Bitter Rivals" | 3:19 |
| 2. | "Sugarcane" | 2:47 |
| 3. | "Minnie" | 3:01 |
| 4. | "Sing Like a Wire" | 2:35 |
| 5. | "Young Legends" | 2:50 |
| 6. | "Tiger Kit" | 2:55 |
| 7. | "You Don't Get Me Twice" | 2:43 |
| 8. | "To Hell With You" | 3:09 |
| 9. | "24" | 2:58 |
| 10. | "Love Sick" | 3:09 |

== Personnel ==
Credits adapted from the liner notes of Bitter Rivals.

Sleigh Bells

- Alexis Krauss – vocals
- Derek E. Miller – all instruments

Additional musicians

- Kevin Osborne – whistling on "To Hell With You"

Production and recording

- Chris Athens – mastering
- Andrew Dawson – mixing, additional production on "Young Legends"
- Will Hubbard – executive producer
- Derek E. Miller – production
- Shane Stoneback – engineering, recording, additional production

Artwork and design

- Steve Attardo – design, layout
- Derek Miller – art direction, original photography

== Charts ==
| Chart (2013) | Peak position |
|---|---|
| UK Indie Albums Chart | 36 |
| US Billboard 200 | 49 |
| US Alternative Albums | 15 |
| US Independent Albums | 9 |
| US Rock Albums | 16 |

== Release history ==
| Region | Date | Format | Label |
|---|---|---|---|
| Germany | October 4, 2013 | Digital download | Lucky Number Music |
| Ireland | October 4, 2013 | CD | Lucky Number Music |
| France | October 7, 2013 | Digital download | Lucky Number Music |
| Ireland | October 7, 2013 | Digital download | Lucky Number Music |
| United Kingdom | October 7, 2013 | CD; digital download | Lucky Number Music |
| United States | October 8, 2013 | CD; LP; digital download | Mom + Pop |
| Australia | October 11, 2013 | CD; digital download | Liberator |
| United Kingdom | October 14, 2013 | LP | Lucky Number Music |
| Germany | October 18, 2013 | CD; LP | Lucky Number Music |
| France | October 21, 2013 | CD | Lucky Number Music |
| Japan | November 27, 2013 | CD | Hostess |
