= Bunky Becky Birthday Boy =

Studio album by Sleigh Bells
- Released: April 4, 2025
- Genres: Pop-punk; pop metal
- Length: 33:56
- Label: Mom + Pop
- Producers: Alexis Krauss; Derek Miller

Sleigh Bells chronology
Texis (2021)	Bunky Becky Birthday Boy (2025)

Singles from Bunky Becky Birthday Boy
- 1. "Bunky Pop" Released: February 19, 2025

Bunky Becky Birthday Boy is the sixth studio album by American musical duo Sleigh Bells. It was released on April 4, 2025, by Mom + Pop Music.

The first released project since the duo's 2021 album, Texis, the album was preceded by the single "Bunky Pop", which was released on February 19, 2025. The single was followed by a music video featuring Dylan Gelula, and directed by Derek Miller and Alex Ross Perry.

== Background ==
Sleigh Bells announced Bunky Becky Birthday Boy in February 2025 alongside the official release of the single "Bunky Pop" and its music video. Guitarist/producer Derek Miller explained that the album's title comes from "Bunky Becky", a nickname for Alexis Krauss's dog Riz who passed away in 2023; "Birthday Boy" is in reference to Krauss's son Wilder, born shortly after Riz's passing.

Even though the title sounds a little ridiculous—and it’s totally okay to laugh at it—with a little bit of context, it’s actually life and death. We lost somebody that we love, and we gained somebody that we love. Derek Miller

According to Miller, the album is loosely conceptualized around Bunky Becky, a character based on Krauss, and her friend Roxette Ric, a character based on Miller.

== Reception ==
Professional ratings
Review scores
Source	Rating
AllMusic	4/5 stars
New Noise Magazine	5/5 stars
Paste	7.6/10
Pitchfork	5.4/10
Sputnikmusic	3.6/5
The Skinny	3/5 stars

Pitchfork rated the album 5.4 out of ten and describing it as "clean and crisp where it should spin out, bubbly where it should be brash."

Billboard referred to it as the duo's "latest day-glo furnace blast of joyous, raucous metal pop." Paste Magazine assigned it a rating of 7.6 out of ten and called the album "a nimble late-career return to form that enlivens their signature loudness with a renewed sense of spirit." Sputnikmusic commented "This thing throws itself into any number of saccharine earworms and goonish singalongs, its brash arena chords a good match for some of the duo's most energizing material to date."

Heather Phares of AllMusic remarked "By giving equal time to headbanging and heartbreak, they've made an immensely satisfying album that's among their finest." New Noise Magazine noted "On the 11-song album, the listener journeys through fun twists and turns with something new around each corner."

The New York Times wrote in its review of the album, describing it as "a recombinant bash, slamming together selected elements of loud and louder styles — punk, metal, grunge, hip-hop, electro, glam, garage-rock," while The Skinny referred to it as "a return to the immediacy that made Sleigh Bells' name – but you wonder whether they had to sacrifice quite so much of the nuance of their last couple of albums in the process."

== Track listing ==
All tracks are written by Alexis Krauss and Derek Miller.

Bunky Becky Birthday Boy track listing
No.	Title	Length
1.	"Bunky Pop"	3:01
2.	"Wanna Start a Band?"	2:53
3.	"Life Was Real"	2:38
4.	"Roxette Ric"	2:48
5.	"This Summer"	3:03
6.	"Can I Scream"	2:33
7.	"Badly"	2:35
8.	"Blasted Shadow"	2:30
9.	"Real Special Cool Thing"	2:43
10.	"Hi Someday"	3:56
11.	"Pulse Drips Quiet"	3:16
Total length:		33:56

== Personnel ==
Credits adapted from Tidal.

=== Sleigh Bells ===
- Alexis Krauss – vocals, production
- Derek Miller – bass, drum machine, guitar, synthesizer, production, engineering (all tracks); vocals (tracks 1, 2), percussion (4)

=== Additional contributors ===
- Joe LaPorta – mastering
- Andrew Dawson – mixing
- Ryan Dieringer – engineering
- Steve Evetts – engineering (tracks 1–6, 8–11)
- Chris Hornbrook – drums (tracks 1–6, 8–11)
- Kate Steinberg – background vocals (tracks 1, 2, 4–7)
- Charlene Kaye – background vocals (tracks 1, 2, 4–6)
- Hannah Winkler – background vocals (tracks 1, 2, 4–6)
- Felicia Douglass – background vocals (track 7)
- Ines Nassara – background vocals (track 7)

== Charts ==
Chart performance for Bunky Becky Birthday Boy
Chart (2025)	Peak position
Scottish Albums (Official Charts)	58
UK Album Downloads (Official Charts)	77
UK Independent Albums (Official Charts)	21
