= Sleigh Bells (band) =

American band

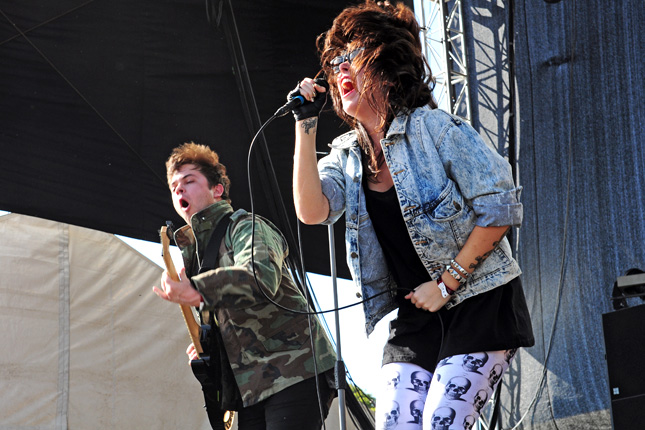
- Sleigh Bells performing at the Southbound festival in March 2011

Background information
- Origin: Brooklyn, New York, US
- Genre: Noise pop
- Years active: 2008–present
- Labels: Mom + Pop; N.E.E.T.; Torn Clean
- Members: Alexis Krauss; Derek Miller
- Website: tornclean.com

Sleigh Bells is an American musical duo based in Brooklyn, New York, formed in 2008 and consisting of vocalist Alexis Krauss and guitarist/producer Derek Miller. The group became known for its overdriven style of noise pop, which incorporates elements from various genres, including pop, hip hop, metal, and punk.

After signing to M.I.A.'s N.E.E.T. Recordings and the independent label Mom + Pop Music, Sleigh Bells released its debut album Treats (2010) to critical acclaim. They followed with Reign of Terror (2012), Bitter Rivals (2013), and Jessica Rabbit (2016). Its fifth album, Texis, was released in September 2021. A sixth, Bunky Becky Birthday Boy, was released in April 2025.

== History ==
=== Background and formation ===
The two members of Sleigh Bells—Derek Miller and Alexis Krauss—had previous experience performing and touring in a musical ensemble. From age 17 to 22, Miller was a guitarist in the post-hardcore band Poison the Well. He played on the band's first three albums, but left in 2004, citing creative differences with the other band members as a key factor for his departure. Krauss meanwhile has a background in theater and television. As a child she appeared in a Nickelodeon Magazine commercial, and starred in a community production of the musical Annie. From age 12 to 16, Krauss performed in the teen pop group RubyBlue. After RubyBlue broke up, Krauss went to college (majoring in political science), taught Spanish at an elementary school in The Bronx, and performed at weddings on the side for fun.

In March 2008, Miller moved to New York City expressly to find a female vocalist for some song demos he was working on. "I'm just obsessed with female vocalists. I don't want to say I was really determined, but I was really determined," said Miller. He began working at a Brazilian bistro in Williamsburg, Brooklyn, and in July, Krauss and her mother dined at the restaurant. Miller expressed his interest in finding a female vocalist for his new project and Krauss was volunteered by her mother. The two met in a park, where she listened to Miller's demos. In a 2012 interview, Krauss recalled her first impressions, saying: "Derek's music sounded like a really interesting challenge, but I wasn't thinking he was somebody I wanted to develop a creative relationship with." Krauss was pursuing a Rhodes Scholarship at the time, but decided to pair up with Miller instead. The band name Sleigh Bells comes from the phrase Miller used to delineate CD-Rs with demos he had worked on.

=== 2009–2011: Sleigh Bells EP and Treats ===
From the beginning, Miller and Krauss set high expectations for themselves, with the goal to make a living off of their music. Krauss noted that when the two began recording together for the first time, Miller wanted to be in control. "It was like a really interesting session gig for me...I always knew it was Derek's thing — he was producing and writing the songs. He had very specific ideas about what the vocals should be like."

The duo performed at the CMJ Music Marathon in October 2009. They signed to M.I.A.'s N.E.E.T. Recordings and Mom + Pop Music in March 2010. The two quickly got in the studio and recorded a seven-track self-titled EP. Their EP soon gained attention from The Guardian, The New York Times, Pitchfork, ABC News's Amplified, and other sources. Stereogum named them a Band to Watch on October 22, 2009. The Guardian named them Band of the Day in December 2009. Their song "Crown on the Ground" was named the 57th best track of 2009 by Pitchfork. Miller produced the track "Meds and Feds" with M.I.A. from the album Maya towards the end of 2009, and began recording Treats with Krauss in 2010. All but one of the tracks from Sleigh Bells EP have been subsequently included on studio albums. Songs "Rill Rill", "Crown on the Ground", "Beach Girls" (later renamed "Kids"), "Infinity Guitars", and "A/B Machines" were released on 2010s Treats. The final track, "2HELLWU", was eventually reworked into the Bitter Rivals track "To Hell with You", released in October 2013.

The group released "Tell 'Em", the first single from their debut album, Treats, as a free download in April 2010. Treats was released in May 2010 by Mom + Pop Music. Alarm Magazine later stated that the album established the band as "the new master of noise pop, infusing overblown electro beats and crunchy, gritty guitars into raucous compositions," concluding that "it was an unapologetic exploration of pushing 'pop' music to its threshold and crossing it."

They performed at the Coachella Valley Music and Arts Festival in April 2010 and 2011, the Primavera Sound Festival in May 2010, and the Pitchfork Music Festival in July 2010.

=== 2011–2012: Reign of Terror ===
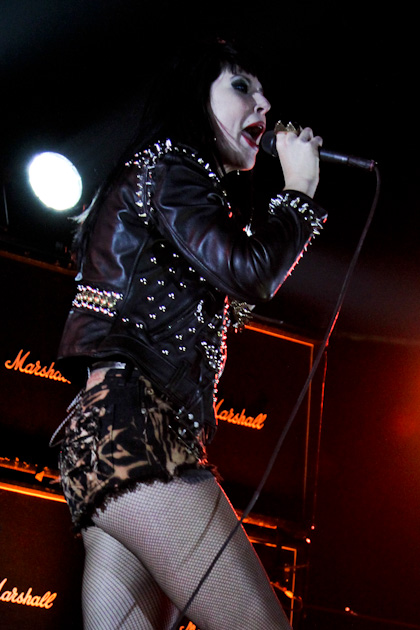
Alexis Krauss of Sleigh Bells performing at the Prudential Center in Newark, New Jersey on May 4, 2012

Sleigh Bells began tracking songs for their second studio album in June 2011. Describing the sound of the new album, Krauss said, "It sounds really huge, so there's going to still be tons of volume."

On December 2, 2011, the band's website began to link to a Vimeo video. It served as a teaser trailer for the upcoming album, revealing the title to be Reign of Terror. There was no release date or any other information attached to the trailer. The trailer features scenes of Krauss sitting at a vanity mirror, grooming herself, interspersed with various backstage and live concert footage, as well as footage depicting the band's touring. For the duration of the video, a riff plays in the background and serves as the only sound. This was later featured in "Rainmaker" on Kid Krushchev.

On December 7, 2011, the band announced via press release both the date of the album's release and the track listing. The band's publicist said of the upcoming release, "[The album features] songs that are as crushing and authoritative as their title suggests; they're effortlessly robust and heavier than any of the band's previous output ... the sonic equivalent of a beautiful shotgun to the head." The album's promotional single, "Born to Lose", was released on December 15, 2011. In an interview with webzine Coup de Main, Krauss was quoted as saying that Reign of Terror is "a much more personal record".

The album was originally set to be released on February 14, 2012, but was pushed back to February 21. Along with the announcement of the release date and track listing, Sleigh Bells also announced a tour of strictly Floridian venues. This tour preceded the release of the album.

Sleigh Bells made their network television debut on the February 18, 2012 episode of Saturday Night Live, performing the songs "Comeback Kid" and "End of the Line". On August 16, 2012, the duo announced a US tour, which kicked off at the Paramount Theatre in Seattle on August 28 and concluded at First Avenue in Minneapolis on November 2, including dates with Swedish hardcore punk band Refused and American DJ AraabMuzik.

=== 2013–2014: Bitter Rivals ===
Only a few months after the release of Reign of Terror, Sleigh Bells began writing a third studio album for a possible 2013 release. Before the end of 2012, the album was said to feature more writing from Krauss and with a cleaner sound. The album, titled Bitter Rivals, was released on October 8, 2013, through Mom + Pop Music. The album was partially inspired by the music of Janet Jackson. According to Krauss, several tracks would feature dynamic acoustic riffs and R&B-ish vocals. In an interview with Rolling Stone magazine, Krauss clarified the new style of the album, saying, "I was interested in doing something Beyoncé or Janet Jackson would do, these slow-winding, sparkling melodies." A music video directed by Sleigh Bells for the album's title track, "Bitter Rivals", was released in September 2013. The band toured North America in October and November 2013 in support of Bitter Rivals with Doldrums and Danny Brown as support.

=== 2015–present: Jessica Rabbit, Texis and Bunky Becky Birthday Boy ===
On December 7, 2015, Sleigh Bells premiered a new song titled "Champions of Unrestricted Beauty", while announcing they were finishing up their fourth studio album. The duo released the single "Rule Number One" on June 7, 2016, followed by "Hyper Dark" on July 19. On August 24, Sleigh Bells announced both the release date and track listing of their upcoming fourth studio album, Jessica Rabbit. The album was released on November 11, 2016, marking the first release on the duo's own label, Torn Clean, in partnership with Sinderlyn.

It was announced on October 10, 2017, that the duo would release a mini-album titled Kid Kruschev on November 10, 2017. On the same day, the lead single "And Saints" was released. "Rainmaker" was released as the second single on October 24.

On September 10, 2021, Texis was released, led by a single and music video for "Locust Laced".

On January 28, 2025, the band shared a single entitled "Wanna Start A Band?", with an American tour simultaneously announced for 2025. The following month, the band officially announced their sixth album Bunky Becky Birthday Boy, which was released on Friday, April 4th via Mom+Pop.

== Musical style ==
The band's music has been known for its juxtaposition of simple pop hooks with loud, rhythmic noise, electronic beats, harsh guitar riffs and dreamy vocals, which has been described mainly as noise pop. The band's music also has been described as noise rock, indie rock, dance-punk, electropunk, digital hardcore, experimental pop, alternative rock, and industrial rock. While their debut album, Treats, was noted for its punk and heavy metal guitars, glam metal influences and mid-tempo beats from hip hop and electro, their second album, Reign of Terror, was also described as a mixture of "heavy metal shredding with R&B vocals".

Heather Phares of AllMusic stated that the work of Sleigh Bells foreshadowed the hyperpop genre and artists such as Grimes, Poppy, and others who "brazenly ignored genre boundaries and united the extremes of sweet and heavy;" Ian Cohen of Pitchfork similarly stated that their sound preempted the hyperpop genre and influenced a number of "ascendant acts blowing bubblegum melodies over razored guitars, while squabbles over cheerleading outfits, prom dresses, and pilfered pop-punk hooks span generations."

== Members ==
- Alexis Krauss – vocals (2008–present)
- Derek Miller – guitar, production, lyrics (2008–present)

=== Current touring musicians ===
- Kate Steinberg – backing vocals, keyboards (2021–present)

=== Former touring musicians ===
- Ryan Primack (Poison the Well) – guitar (2013)
- Chris Maggio (Trap Them) – drums (2013)
- Jason Boyer – guitar (2012–2013)

=== Alexis Krauss ===
Alexis Krauss
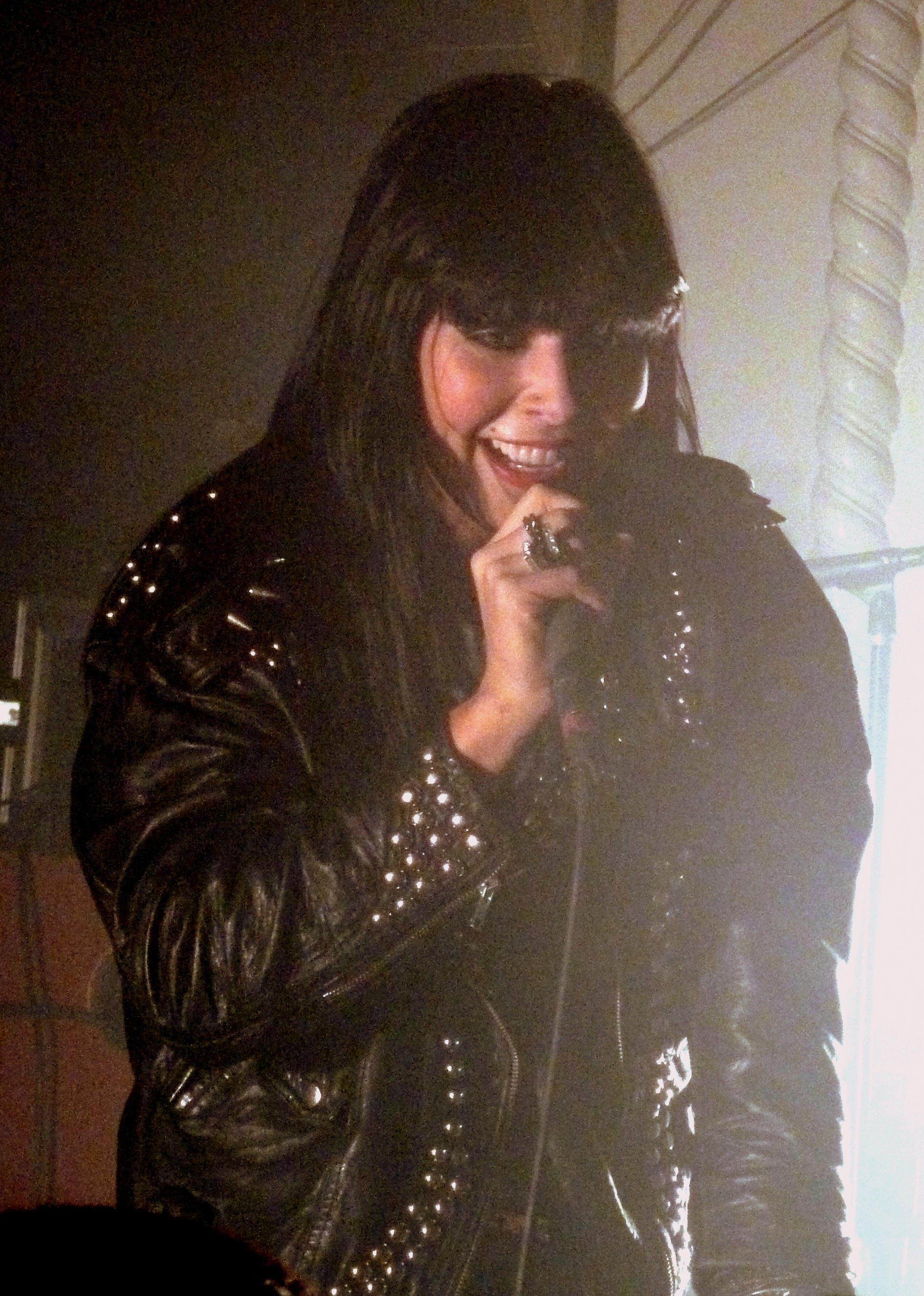
- Krauss performing at the Clazel Theater in Bowling Green, Ohio, 2012

Background information
- Born: Sydney Alexis Krauss; September 27, 1985 (age 41); Manasquan, New Jersey, U.S.
- Genre: Noise pop
- Occupations: Singer; songwriter; schoolteacher
- Years active: 2008–present
- Labels: Mom + Pop; N.E.E.T.; Torn Clean
- Member of: Sleigh Bells
- Formerly of: RubyBlue

Sydney Alexis Krauss (born September 27, 1985) is an American singer, songwriter, former schoolteacher, activist and frontwoman of Sleigh Bells. She is also co-founder of Beauty Lies Truth, a website dedicated to educating consumers about the ingredients in personal care products.

Sydney Alexis Duncan Krauss was born and raised in Manasquan, New Jersey, where she attended Manasquan High School. Her father, Joel Krauss, is a professional musician who was a member of Holme and a founding member of Cats on a Smooth Surface. Her mother is Karen Duncan, a registered nurse.

Krauss performed in music and musical theatre from the age of nine until the age of 16. As a teenager, she sang lead vocals and played bass in an all-girl pop group called RubyBlue, which recorded two singles and an unreleased album before breaking up.

After breaking from music, Krauss returned to school and majored in international studies at Marymount Manhattan College, and then received New York State certificates for elementary and bilingual education at Pace University. Krauss had been teaching elementary school with Teach For America for two years before she met soon-to-be Sleigh Bells bandmate Derek Miller, who was the server at the restaurant she and her mother were dining in. Miller mentioned that he was looking for a vocalist for his music project and Krauss' mother suggested Krauss.

==== Other ventures ====
In February 2014, Krauss and her friend Jessica Assaf founded the blog Beauty Lies Truth, which educates consumers on the toxic ingredients in cosmetics and skincare products. The blog was officially launched in August 2014.

== Discography ==
=== Studio albums ===
Title	Details	Peak chart positions										Sales
Title	Details	US	US Indie	US Rock	AUS	BEL Heat.	CAN	IRE	SCO	UK	UK Indie	Sales
Treats	Released: May 24, 2010; Label: Mom + Pop, N.E.E.T.; Formats: CD, LP, digital download	39	4	14	81	—	—	—	—	152	12	US: 180,000
Reign of Terror	Released: February 21, 2012; Label: Mom + Pop; Formats: CD, LP, digital download	12	1	3	33	13	35	64	69	48	—	US: 80,000
Bitter Rivals	Released: October 4, 2013; Label: Mom + Pop; Formats: CD, LP, digital download	49	9	16	—	—	—	—	—	158	36	
Jessica Rabbit	Released: November 11, 2016; Label: Torn Clean; Formats: CD, LP, digital download, streaming	187	12	19	—	—	—	—	—	—	35	
Texis	Released: September 10, 2021; Label: Mom + Pop; Formats: CD, LP, digital download, streaming	—	—	—	—	—	—	—	—	—	—	
Bunky Becky Birthday Boy	Released: April 4, 2025; Label: Mom + Pop; Formats: CD, LP, digital download, streaming	—	—	—	—	—	—	—	—	—	—	
"—" denotes a recording that did not chart or was not released in that territory.

=== EPs ===
Title	Details
Sleigh Bells	Released: December 6, 2009; Label: Self-released; Format: Digital download
Kid Kruschev	Released: November 10, 2017; Label: Torn Clean; Format: Digital download, LP

=== Singles ===
List of singles, with selected chart positions, showing year released and album name
Title	Year	Peak chart positions			Album
Title	Year	MEX Air.	UK Sales	UK Indie	Album
"Tell 'Em"	2010	27	45	— (Note: "Tell 'Em" did not enter the UK Independent Singles Chart, but peaked at number 15 on the UK Independent Singles Breakers Chart.)	Treats
"Infinity Guitars"	2010	20	—	40	Treats
"Rill Rill"	2010	25	—	—	Treats
"Riot Rhythm"	2011	33	—	— (Note: "Riot Rhythm" did not enter the UK Independent Singles Chart, but peaked at number 13 on the UK Independent Singles Breakers Chart.)	Treats
"Comeback Kid"	2012	34	—	—	Reign of Terror
"Bitter Rivals"	2013	—	—	—	Bitter Rivals
"That Did It" (featuring Tink)	2014	—	—	—	Non-album single
"Rule Number One"	2016	—	—	—	Jessica Rabbit
"Hyper Dark"	2016	—	—	—	Jessica Rabbit
"I Can Only Stare"	2016	—	—	—	Jessica Rabbit
"And Saints"	2017	—	—	—	Kid Kruschev
"Rainmaker"	2017	—	—	—	Kid Kruschev
"Where Did You Sleep Last Night"	2019	—	—	—	Non-album single
"Wanna Start A Band?"	2025	—	—	—	Bunky Becky Birthday Boy
"Bunky Pop"	2025	—	—	—	Bunky Becky Birthday Boy
"This Summer"	2025	—	—	—	Bunky Becky Birthday Boy
"—" denotes a recording that did not chart or was not released in that territory.

=== Music videos ===
Title	Year	Director(s)
"Infinity Guitars"	2010	Phil Pinto
"Riot Rhythm"	2010	Bo Mirosseni
"Rill Rill"	2011	Jon Watts
"Comeback Kid"	2012	Derek Miller and Gregory Kohn
"Demons"	2012	Derek Miller and Gregory Kohn
"End of the Line"	2012	Derek Miller and Gregory Kohn
"Bitter Rivals"	2013	Sleigh Bells
"That Did It" (featuring Tink)	2014	Grant Singer
"It's Just Us Now"	2016	Derek Miller
"I Can Only Stare"	2016	Alex Ross Perry and Derek Miller
"And Saints"	2017	Mimi Cave and Derek Miller
"Favorite Transgressions"	2018	Derek Miller
"Locust Laced"	2021	Derek Miller and Nina Ljeti
"Justine Go Genesis"	2021	Alex Ross Perry and Derek Miller
"Bunky Pop"	2025	Alex Ross Perry and Derek Miller
