= Kid Kruschev =

EP by Sleigh Bells
- Released: November 10, 2017
- Genre: Noise pop
- Length: 21:49
- Label: Torn Clean
- Producer: Sleigh Bells

Sleigh Bells chronology
Jessica Rabbit (2016)	Kid Kruschev (2017)	Texis (2021)

Singles from Kid Kruschev
- 1. "And Saints" Released: October 10, 2017; 2. "Rainmaker" Released: October 24, 2017

Kid Kruschev is an EP (referred to as a "mini-album") by American noise pop duo Sleigh Bells. It was released on November 10, 2017 through Torn Clean.

The mini-album was preceded by the lead single "And Saints", released on October 10, and the second single "Rainmaker", released on October 24.

== Release and promotion ==
On October 10, 2017, the duo announced that they would release a mini-album titled Kid Kruschev on November 10. That same day, they released the lead single, "And Saints". Derek Miller stated in a press release:

Alexis moved north of Brooklyn recently, somewhere with trees and cliffs, providing us with a new space to write and record without pissing off neighbors, so that's what we've been doing. We didn't want to wait another year or two to release something. We like the idea of putting out shorter records at a more consistent rate, so we’re gonna give it a shot for a while, see how it feels.

On October 24, the second single, "Rainmaker", was released. The duo will be heading on tour in the United States, beginning in January 2018, in support of the mini-album.

On April 21, 2018, the first and only vinyl pressing was released to celebrate Record Store Day 2018. The exclusive album was pressed on clear vinyl and limited to 1000 copies.

== Critical reception ==
Professional ratings
Aggregate scores
Source	Rating
Metacritic	65/100
Review scores
Source	Rating
Drowned in Sound	7/10
Pitchfork	6.4/10
The Skinny	4/5 stars
Slant Magazine	2.5/5 stars

At Metacritic, which assigns a normalized rating out of 100 to reviews from mainstream publications, the album received an average score of 65, based on seven reviews, indicating "generally favorable reviews". Megan Wallace of The Skinny said that "Kid Kruschev sees Sleigh Bells strike a delicate balance, branching into new creative waters whilst staying true to the musical formula which first garnered them attention." Drowned in Sound critic Lee Adcock wrote, "Without any obvious signifiers, Kid Kruschev could resonate for many other voices–which, granted, was also true for Jessica Rabbit, but still satisfying. And while Sleigh Bells deliver no knockout punch this time around, don't let your guard down, or else." Pitchfork's Sasha Geffen thought the mini-album has "more thematic cohesion than their previous releases and also a surprising tenderness," and stated that Alexis Krauss "directs this show, and the space she occupies helps the lyrics stick." In a more mixed review, Zachary Hoskins from Slant Magazine wrote, "Seven years after their debut, they remain both confined and defined by their early novelty as the twee pop group with the loud guitars."

== Track listing ==
No.	Title	Length
1.	"Blue Trash Mattress Fire"	4:02
2.	"Favorite Transgressions"	2:27
3.	"Rainmaker"	3:50
4.	"Panic Drills"	3:08
5.	"Show Me the Door"	3:03
6.	"Florida Thunderstorm"	2:30
7.	"And Saints"	2:49
Total length:		21:49
