= Treats (album) =

Studio album by Sleigh Bells
- Released: May 24, 2010
- Studios: Treefort Studios (Brooklyn, New York City)
- Genres: Noise pop; electro-pop; electro-rock; pop metal; art pop
- Length: 32:06
- Labels: Mom + Pop; N.E.E.T.
- Producer: Derek Miller

Sleigh Bells chronology
Sleigh Bells (EP) (2009)	Treats (2010)	Reign of Terror (2012)

Singles from Treats
- 1. "Tell 'Em" Released: April 28, 2010; 2. "Infinity Guitars" Released: November 14, 2010; 3. "Riot Rhythm" Released: February 14, 2011

Treats is the debut studio album by the American noise pop duo Sleigh Bells, consisting of the vocalist Alexis Krauss and the producer-guitarist Derek Miller. It was released on May 24, 2010, by Mom+Pop and N.E.E.T. Recordings. The release was preceded by the April single "Tell 'Em" and featured the group's most popular track, the Funkadelic-sampling "Rill Rill".

The album won the group critical acclaim. It drew attention for its distorted sound and hybrid of genre elements, including pop hooks, the guitar riffs of punk and metal, and beats from hip hop and electro. It was named among the 10 best albums of the year by Slant, Paste and Entertainment Weekly.

== Background ==
The two members of Sleigh Bells—Derek Miller (production/guitar) and Alexis Krauss (vocals)—both had previous experience performing and touring in a musical ensemble. From age 17 to 22, Miller was a guitarist in the metalcore band Poison the Well. Krauss had a background in theater and television, and from age 12 to 16 she performed in the teen pop group RubyBlue. In March 2008, Miller moved to New York City to find a female vocalist for some demos he was working on, and after meeting Krauss the two began collaborating.

Miller's demos gained the attention of M.I.A. and Spike Jonze. Miller stated that the ensuing positive feedback and his "dream collaboration" working with M.I.A. in her studio on the album Maya (2010) gave him the confidence to do the Treats record without a co-producer. Miller worked with M.I.A. on the track "Meds and Feds" in 2009, following which she signed the group to her label N.E.E.T. Recordings. Krauss said of M.I.A.: "It's really exciting to have her in our court and be able to work with her [...] It's the fact that she had interest in us literally before anyone else cared at all which definitely boosted our confidence."

== Recording ==
Miller ascribed the album's distorted, overdriven sound to the fact that "everything was pushed into the red." Krauss spoke of her enjoyment at the collaborative nature of the album making process with Miller, telling Drowned in Sound, "When we got into the studio we began collaborating more. There's a few tracks on the album—'Tell Em', 'Riot Rhythms', 'Tell the Heart' [sic]—which definitely became more collaborative in terms of me doing more work on melodies, harmonies and we plan on further explorations of this in the future." The album was recorded at Treefort Studios in Brooklyn.

== Release ==
The lead single from Treats, "Tell 'Em", was released as a free download on April 28, 2010, via the duo's official website. "Infinity Guitars" was released on November 14, 2010, as the second single from the album. Rolling Stone placed the track at number 21 on their list of the 50 Best Songs of 2010. The music video for "Infinity Guitars" premiered on NME's website on September 19, 2010. "Riot Rhythm" was released on February 14, 2011, as the album's third and final single.

The track "Rill Rill" features a sample of Funkadelic's "Can You Get to That" from the 1971 album Maggot Brain. It became the band's best known song and was used in a 2013 iPhone advertisement.

== Critical reception ==
Professional ratings
Aggregate scores
Source	Rating
AnyDecentMusic?	8.2/10
Metacritic	84/100
Review scores
Source	Rating
AllMusic	4/5 stars
The A.V. Club	A−
Entertainment Weekly	A−
The Guardian	4/5 stars
Los Angeles Times	3/4 stars
MSN Music (Expert Witness)	A−
NME	8/10
Pitchfork	8.7/10
Rolling Stone	3.5/5 stars
Spin	8/10

At Metacritic, which assigns a normalized rating out of 100 to reviews from mainstream publications, Treats has an average score of 84 based on 35 reviews, indicating “universal acclaim”. AllMusic called it album "one of 2010’s most attention-getting debuts", writing that "Derek Miller and Alexis Krauss craft a sound that’s all climax," featuring a "boldness, immediacy, and sense of fun that’s missing from too much other music". Pitchfork writer Mark Richardson stated that "the music's essentials-- jackhammer riffs clipped from punk and metal, mid-tempo beats from hip-hop and electro, and supremely catchy sing-song melodies-- [are] remarkably fresh and unlike anything else right now." Bob Boilen of NPR described the album as a "thrill ride" which is "somehow both an aural assault and a piece of pop candy," noting its "excessively compressed beats and abrupt guitars" along with Krauss's "melodic counterpoint, with a sweetness that can turn fierce." Paste called it "a supremely raw and visceral pop masterwork" and "32-minute sonic rollercoaster that’s totally, gloriously, devoid of subtlety and restraint [...] with mixing cranked so high your speakers sound like they’re about to combust."

Rolling Stone reviewer Jon Dolan described the music as consisting of "neck-snapping hip-hop beats and blasts of gonzo riffage from producer Derek Miller; bratty, bubbly chant-singing from Alexis Krauss; everything air-raid-siren loud," citing it as "noise that's friendly and cute, primitivism that masks pop smarts and respect for tradition". New Musical Express called it "a work that not so much mixes genres as smashes them into one visceral, jaw-dropping hybrid." Leah Greenblatt of Entertainment Weekly praised its "genre-swerving sound—primitive guitar fuzz, pastiche beats, sugar-buzz vocals" which "bypasses the default snark button and burrows directly into jaded listeners’ punch-drunk pleasure centers." The Los Angeles Times called the music "filthy, audibly painful" but also possibly "the most delirious, joyful and defining album of 2010."

In retrospect, Dan Weiss of Paste stated that the album's "shrieking, granular distortion [...] had that perfect blend of intention and accident, both out of nowhere and sorely needed," in which "all the bluntest aspects of grindcore, crunk rap and chirpy bubblegum audibly fought for space, and still with time for a Funkadelic sample break on the most-celebrated, uncharacteristic "Rill Rill." Alarm Magazine stated that the album established the band as "the new master of noise pop, infusing overblown electro beats and crunchy, gritty guitars into raucous compositions," concluding that "it was an unapologetic exploration of pushing 'pop' music to its threshold and crossing it."

=== Accolades ===
Publication	Rank	List
Drowned in Sound	40	Albums of the Year 2010
Entertainment Weekly	6	10 Best Albums of 2010
Exclaim!	16	Pop & Rock: Year in Review 2010
NME	40	75 Best Albums of 2010
Paste	6	The 50 Best Albums of 2010
Pitchfork	16	The Top 50 Albums of 2010
PopMatters	11	The 70 Best Albums of 2010
Slant Magazine	4	The 25 Best Albums of 2010
Spin	29	The 40 Best Albums of 2010

== Track listing ==
All tracks are written by Sleigh Bells.

No.	Title	Length
1.	"Tell 'Em"	2:56
2.	"Kids"	2:46
3.	"Riot Rhythm"	2:37
4.	"Infinity Guitars"	2:32
5.	"Run the Heart"	2:41
6.	"Rachel"	2:19
7.	"Rill Rill"	3:50
8.	"Crown on the Ground"	3:49
9.	"Straight A's"	1:32
10.	"A/B Machines"	3:35
11.	"Treats"	3:29

Notes

- "Rill Rill" contains portions of "Can You Get to That" by Funkadelic.

== Personnel ==
Credits adapted from the liner notes of Treats.

Sleigh Bells

- Derek Miller – instruments, artwork, production
- Alexis Krauss – vocals

Additional personnel

- Ana Alvarez – vocals ("Kids")
- Eric Biondo – trumpet ("Kids")
- Demi Colon – vocals ("Kids")
- Ferry Gouw – layout, Treats logo
- Curtis Hasselbring – trombone ("Kids")
- Will Hubbard – artwork, executive producer
- Joe LaPorta – mastering
- Emily Lazar – mastering
- Isamar Leonardo – vocals ("Kids")
- Ever Ronquillo – engineering assistance
- Adam Schatz – tenor saxophone ("Kids")
- Shane P. Stoneback – engineering
- Jacob Wick – trumpet ("Kids")

== Charts ==
=== Weekly charts ===
Chart (2010–2011)	Peak position
Australian Albums Chart	81
UK Albums Chart	152
UK Indie Albums Chart	12
US Billboard 200	39
US Alternative Albums	8
US Independent Albums	4
US Top Rock Albums	14

=== Year-end charts ===
Chart (2010)	Position
US Independent Albums	45

As of 2013 it has sold 180,000 copies in United States according to Nielsen SoundScan.

== Release history ==
Region	Date	Format	Label	Ref.
United Kingdom	May 24, 2010	Digital download	Mom + Pop	
United States	June 1, 2010	CD; digital download	Mom + Pop; N.E.E.T.	
Germany	June 4, 2010	Digital download	Mom + Pop	
Australia	June 18, 2010	CD; digital download	Liberator	
United Kingdom	June 21, 2010	CD	Mom + Pop	
Germany	June 22, 2010	LP	Sony	
United Kingdom	June 28, 2010	LP	Mom + Pop	
Japan	October 13, 2010	CD	Sony	
Germany	October 15, 2010	CD	Sony	
United States	April 26, 2011	LP	Mom + Pop; N.E.E.T.	
