= Jessica Rabbit (album) =

Studio album by Sleigh Bells
- Released: November 11, 2016
- Studio: The Bayou, The Creamery, Faculty, Treefort (Brooklyn, New York); Blue Lagoon (Sherman Oaks, California); Can-Am Recorders (Tarzana, California); San Francisco Soundworks (San Francisco, California)
- Genre: Indie pop
- Length: 42:58
- Label: Torn Clean
- Producer: Sleigh Bells

Sleigh Bells chronology
Bitter Rivals (2013)	Jessica Rabbit (2016)	Kid Kruschev (2017)

Singles from Jessica Rabbit
- 1. "Rule Number One" Released: June 7, 2016; 2. "Hyper Dark" Released: July 19, 2016; 3. "I Can Only Stare" Released: October 4, 2016

Jessica Rabbit is the fourth studio album by American noise pop duo Sleigh Bells. It was released on November 11, 2016, by Torn Clean, the duo's own label, in partnership with Sinderlyn.

== Critical reception ==
Professional ratings
Aggregate scores
Source	Rating
Metacritic	72/100
Review scores
Source	Rating
AllMusic	4/5 stars
The A.V. Club	C
DIY	4/5 stars
Drowned in Sound	9/10
The Guardian	4/5 stars
NME	3/5 stars
Pitchfork	5.9/10
PopMatters	7/10 stars
Rolling Stone	3.5/5 stars
Slant Magazine	3/5 stars

Jessica Rabbit received generally positive reviews from music critics. At Metacritic, which assigns a normalized rating out of 100 to reviews from mainstream publications, the album received an average score of 72, based on 24 reviews. Lee Adcock of Drowned in Sound stated that "[e]verything about Jessica Rabbit is visceral—full-force drum slams, the slick claps, Miller's steely slabs of guitar, lyrics replete with bombs, knives, and natural disasters." El Hunt of DIY opined, "Energising Sleigh Bells with rocket-fuel, Jessica Rabbit stands up as the band's most consistent record since Treats." Heather Phares of AllMusic noted that "instead of just tweaking their dynamics, [the duo] play fast and loose with the most conventional and experimental parts of their music", concluding, "Contrasts like these have been Sleigh Bells' modus operandi since the beginning, but Jessica Rabbit's mix of brashness and finesse proves they can still thrill." The Guardian's Gwilym Mumford found that "there's a wider sonic palette on show than on previous efforts: snatches of synth and glitchy breakbeats jostle for attention alongside Alex Krauss's clean, poppy vocals", calling the album an "encouraging move into new territory". Rolling Stone's Sarah Grant commented, "When Brooklyn duo Sleigh Bells arrived six years ago, their wild-style hip-hop/noise-punk seemed like an explosive novelty. Four records into their run, they're still building on it".

Mark Beaumont of NME wrote, "It's all deranged enough to convince us that Sleigh Bells are still menacing outliers, but on a deep cover mission to infiltrate the mainstream, horns still poking out of their '80s mullet wigs." Pitchfork's Evan Rytlewski viewed the album as "a hodgepodge of clashing sounds and concepts that's united only by its indiscriminate maximalism", adding that "the duo has never seemed to be trying harder than they are here, so although Jessica Rabbit is even more scattershot than Bitter Rivals was, it at least has a sense of showmanship that album didn't." Josh Goller of Slant Magazine remarked that the album's "greater emphasis on melody, along with its more diverse, if occasionally too random, structure, clearly comes from savvier musicians who are more aware of their own tendencies and flaws, even if they can't always overcome them." Cole Waterman of PopMatters wrote that "the album manages to still sound like Sleigh Bells, though unlike anything they've previously released", but felt that a "bloated tracklist of 14 songs is baffling [and] the middle section bears the brunt of this quality dip. Had they edited it down to a more succinct 10 or even nine songs, such a knock could have been largely avoided." Kevin Warwick of The A.V. Club expressed that "though Krauss does her damnedest to work with the quick-shifting rhythms and deep grab bag of ideas on Jessica Rabbit, she still sounds like she's trying to keep up with its zigzagging movement."

== Track listing ==
All tracks are written by Derek Miller and Alexis Krauss, except where noted. All tracks produced by Sleigh Bells.

No.	Title	Length
1.	"It's Just Us Now"	3:09
2.	"Torn Clean"	1:21
3.	"Lightning Turns Sawdust Gold"	3:17
4.	"I Can't Stand You Anymore" (writers: Miller, Krauss, Mike Elizondo)	4:01
5.	"Crucible"	3:01
6.	"Loyal For"	1:58
7.	"I Can Only Stare"	3:33
8.	"Throw Me Down the Stairs"	2:42
9.	"Unlimited Dark Paths"	3:14
10.	"I Know Not to Count on You"	2:19
11.	"Rule Number One"	4:04
12.	"Baptism by Fire" (writers: Miller, Krauss, Elizondo)	4:23
13.	"Hyper Dark"	3:13
14.	"As If"	2:43

Limited edition vinyl bonus 7-inch
No.	Title	Length
1.	"Champions of Unrestricted Beauty"	3:49

== Personnel ==
Credits adapted from the liner notes of Jessica Rabbit.

=== Sleigh Bells ===
- Sleigh Bells – production
- Alexis Krauss – melodies, vocals
- Derek Miller – beats, design, drums, engineering, guitar, layout, melodies, percussion, piano, synths, words

=== Additional personnel ===
- Brent Arrowood – engineering
- Andrew Dawson – mixing (tracks 1–10, 12–14)
- Mike Elizondo – engineering (all tracks); executive production (tracks 4, 7, 9, 11–13); synths (tracks 4, 7, 12)
- Jeffrey Fettig – engineering
- Adam Hawkins – engineering (all tracks); mixing (track 11)
- Will Hubbard – design, layout
- Joe LaPorta – mastering
- Brian Montuori – artwork
- Simeon Spiegel – engineering
- Shane Stoneback – engineering
- Nick Sylvester – engineering
- Chris Zane – engineering

== Charts ==
Chart (2016)	Peak position
UK Independent Albums (OCC)	35
US Billboard 200	187
US Independent Albums (Billboard)	12
US Top Alternative Albums (Billboard)	8
US Top Rock Albums (Billboard)	19
US Vinyl Albums (Billboard)	2

== Release history ==
Region	Date	Format	Label
United Kingdom	November 11, 2016	CD; digital download	Lucky Number Music
United States	November 11, 2016	CD; LP; digital download	Torn Clean
