= Tell 'Em (Sleigh Bells song) =

2010 single by Sleigh Bells

Single by Sleigh Bells

from the album Treats
- B-side: "Holly"
- Released: April 28, 2010
- Length: 2:56
- Label: Mom + Pop; N.E.E.T.
- Songwriter: Derek E. Miller
- Producer: Derek E. Miller

Sleigh Bells singles chronology
"Tell 'Em" (2010)	"Infinity Guitars" (2010)

"Tell 'Em" is the debut single by American music duo Sleigh Bells, released on April 28, 2010. It is from their debut album Treats, and appears as the album's opening track. The song was written by Derek E. Miller and sung by Alexis Krauss.

Prior to the album's release, the track was available as a free download on April 28, 2010, via the Mom + Pop website. It was well received by critics, and frequently noted as a highlight of the album. The song was released to U.S. radio stations on April 28, 2010, but it failed to enter any charts.

== Writing and recording ==
In an interview with Drowned in Sound, Krauss referred to the song among others as "more collaborative in terms of me doing more work on melodies, harmonies and we plan on further explorations of this in the future." Miller, when asked about the duo's loud sound, referenced the song, stating, "It has this intense melody on it. I was afraid to do it for so long because I had abandoned heavy drone for a few years. But it was just there, always in the background and I was just craving it."

Miller described the song as being "preach-y without being righteous. It's like we're disappointed but optimistic." The song's lyrics detail a disappointment in today's youths and an encouragement for teens to strive to be better, and it was one of the last to be recorded for the album.

== Composition ==
"Tell 'Em" is a song composed of an intro, which has been described as a mixture of "piledriving beats" and a "towering riff trigger", "bazooka beats and syncopated snaps" incorporated with "heavy metal guitar riffs", and a chorus featuring Krauss' vocals over "machine-gun drums". The song also incorporates various snaps and claps.

== Reception ==
=== Critical response ===
Professional ratings
Review scores
Source	Rating
Rolling Stone	3/5 stars

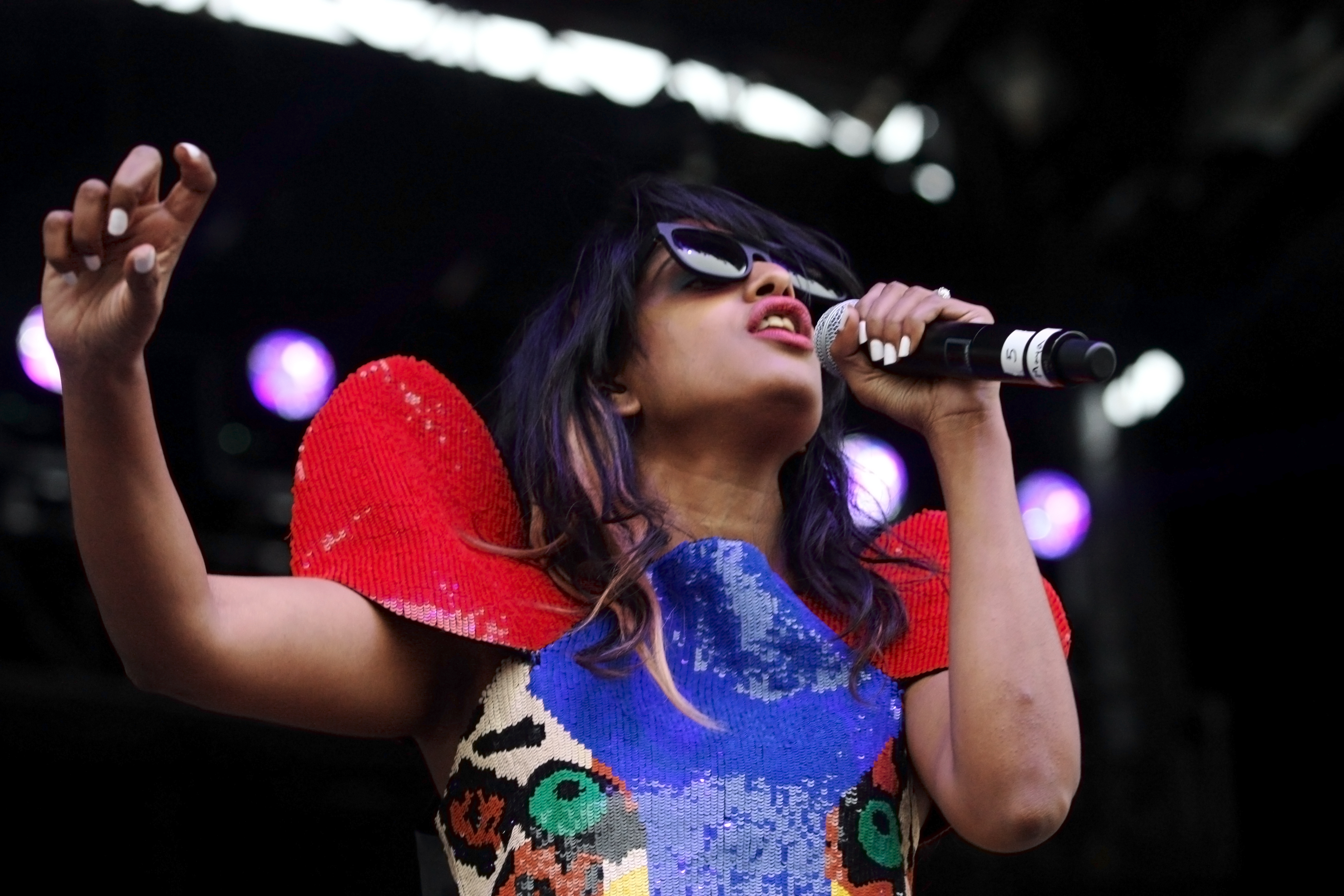
The song's style has been compared to that of singer M.I.A.

Since its release, the song has been hailed by music critics for its intense sound, with one noting its similarity to the songs of electronic singer M.I.A. Lisa Wright, a writer from NME, lauded the song, declaring "not since Miss Arulpragasam herself has there been a track that makes violence sound so goddamn danceable." Zach Baron of Village Voice praised the song's production, comparing it to "winning a video game shootout inside of a disco that's on neon fire." Michael Saba of Paste also wrote highly of the song, calling it "a beast of a track—three minutes of the crunchy, glitched-out riffs and titanic hooks". PopMatters' editor Arnold Pan, like other critics, commented on the song's intensity, writing, "You'll probably be too shellshocked by the anxiety-inducing and heart-palpitating thrills of the leadoff track 'Tell 'Em' to do anything else but take it all in, even if your eardrums tell you to turn off the racket."

Ryan Dombal of Pitchfork commented positively on the song, stating that "nobody has made a guitar sound so hawkish since Jack White. Because it's got both the bone crunch of third and long and the pom-pom chants built in." Rolling Stone's Eric Magnuson, impressed with the song's sound, referred to it as "a body-shaker that sounds like a choir girl showing up to a street fight with a howitzer and a holster full of lasers. Danceable lasers." Matthew Cole of Slant Magazine described the song as "a call to the dance floor, mosh pit, or wherever it is that folks from your scene get down, it's undeniable." In Sputnikmusic's review of the album, the song was described as "the perfect litmus test: buzzsaw guitars, frenetic bass, and Alexis Krauss' melodic, choir-girl vocal hooks make for something as initially uncomfortable as it is incredibly catchy." Erik Adams of The A.V. Club stated "tracks like 'Tell 'Em' and 'Treats' trade on some of the last three decades of pop music's most noxious textures—harmonized, Joe Satriani-esque guitar heroics; dark stabs of synthesizers lifted from crunk and snap—but those sounds are transformed into undeniable hooks when filtered through Miller's songwriting smarts and laid under the deceptively sweet vocals of Alexis Krauss.

=== Accolades ===
Daily news site IndieWire placed the song at number forty on its list of The 50 Best Songs of 2010. Matthew Cole of Slant Magazine deemed the song the best album opener of 2010.

=== Pop culture ===
A part of the song is used as the theme of TRTÉ's show "The Rumour Room". It was also featured in a commercial for The X Games. Used as a theme song for Professional Wrestler Rob Van Dam

== Track listing ==
- CD single
1. "Tell 'Em" - 2:56
2. "Holly" - 2:56

== Personnel ==
- Derek E. Miller - songwriter, guitarist, producer
- Alexis Krauss - vocals, songwriter

== Charts ==
Chart (2011)	Peak position
UK Physical Singles Chart (Official Charts Company)	45
