= Basto =

Belgian record producer, musician and DJ

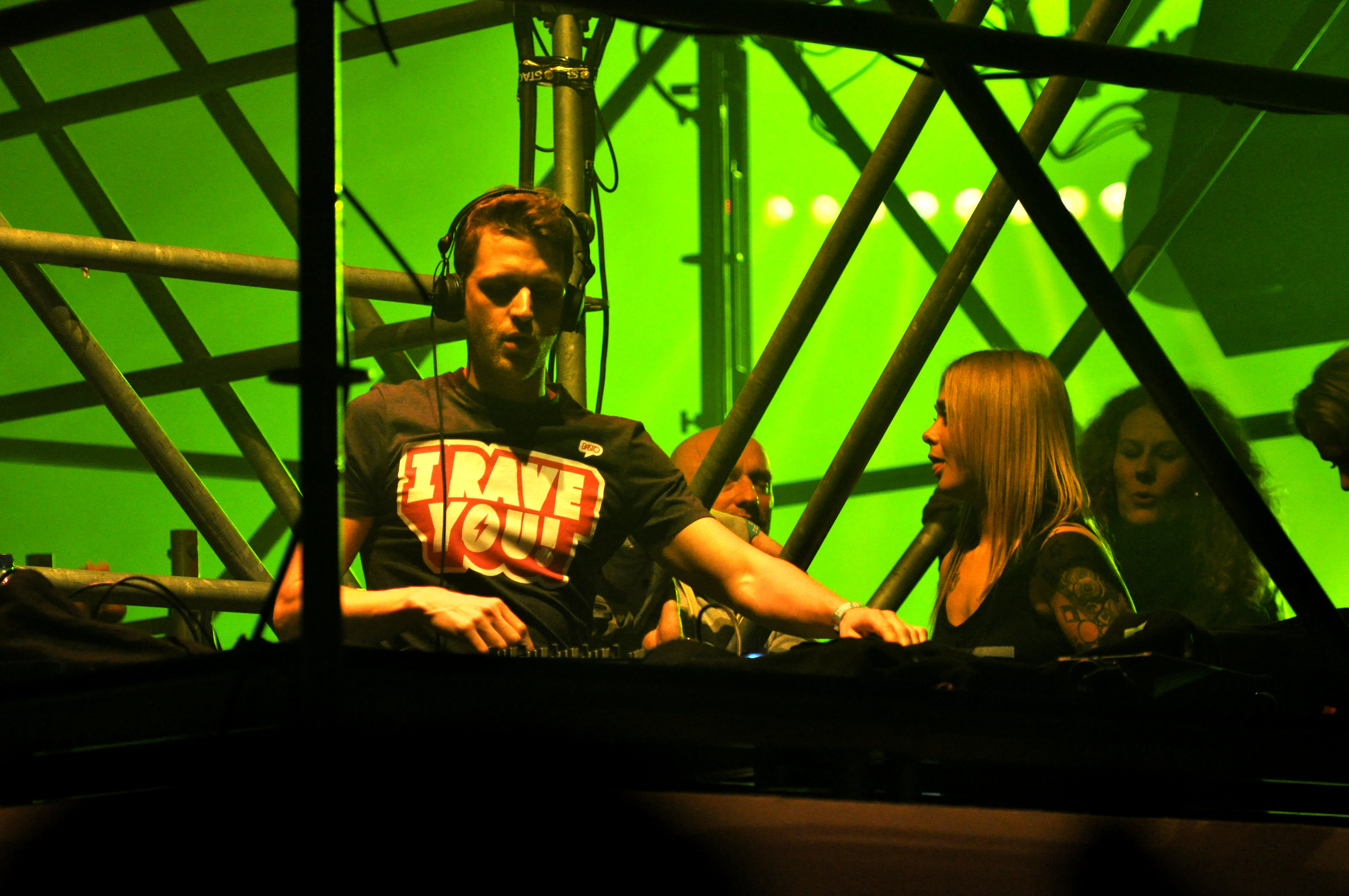
- Basto at the Paaspop Festival in 2013

Background information
- Birth name: Jef Martens
- Also known as: Basto!; Comet Blue; Bitch Boys; Candyman; Dirty Bunch; DJ Basiq; Felix Project; Jin Sonic; Kings of Porn; Lazy Jay
- Born: Hoogstraten, Belgium
- Genres: Electro house; progressive house; hard dance
- Occupations: Record producer; musician; DJ
- Years active: 2005–present
- Labels: ARS; Big & Dirty; Spinnin'; Ultra; Zoo; 541; N.E.W.S.; Epic Amsterdam; Sony

Jef Martens (Flemish pronunciation: [ʑɛf ˈmɑrtəns]), better known by his stage name Basto (stylized as Basto!), is a Belgian record producer, musician and DJ. He primarily produces electro house music, and he is signed to the ARS label. He has produced using various aliases such as Bitch Boys, Candyman, Dirty Bunch, DJ Basik, Felix Project, Jin Sonic, Kings of Porn, and Lazy Jay. He was also a member of the Belgian dance group Lasgo. Martens co-produced with the band in 2009 and 2010 on a number of singles. He is best known for producing Azealia Banks' hit debut single "212" under the alias of Lazy Jay, together with his brother Toon. He also produced "Scream & Shout" for will.i.am and Britney Spears in 2012.

== Musical career ==
He started DJing in 2005, finding local success in Belgium and the Netherlands through "Rock With You" (2005) and a later cooperation with Peter Luts in "On My Own" (2008). It was with "Gregory's Theme" (2011) that Basto found chart success in France. After some well-received remixes for well-known artists, including Kylie Minogue, Moby and Sander Van Doorn, he gained international fame through a successful dance hit, "Again and Again" in 2011. Basto! dropped the exclamation mark from his name to be known as Basto.

== Discography ==
=== Studio albums ===
- Live Tonight (2013)

=== Extended plays ===
2017

- EP 1

2018

- Sunrise / Shut Your Eyes

=== Singles ===
==== As lead artist ====
List of singles as lead artist, with selected chart positions and certifications, showing year released and album name
Title	Year	Peak chart positions							Certifications	Album
Title	Year	BEL (FL)	BEL (WA)	CZE	FRA	NLD	SUI	SWE Dance	Certifications	Album
"Rock With You"	2005	24	22	—	—	37	—	—		Non-album singles
"On My Own" (with Peter Luts)	2008	31	—	—	—	75	—	—		Non-album singles
"Gregory's Theme"	2011	12	50	36	—	47	—	—		Live Tonight
"Again and Again"	2011	86	22	52	18	42	22	20	GLF: Gold	Live Tonight
"Maverick" (as Lazy Jay)	2012	—	—	—	—	—	—	—		Non-album single
"CloudBreaker" (vs. Yves V)	2012	22	27	—	22	29	—	—		Live Tonight
"I Rave You"	2012	83	56	45	29	96	—	—		Live Tonight
"Bonny"	2012	—	—	—	—	—	—	—		Live Tonight
"StormChaser"	2013	121	74	—	40	—	—	—		Live Tonight
"On The Rocks" (as Lazy Jay)	2013	36	—	—	—	—	—	—		Non-album single
"Dance With Me"	2013	—	—	—	161	—	—	—		Live Tonight
"Keep On Rocking"	2014	86	—	—	—	—	—	—		Live Tonight
"Electric Stars" (featuring Maruja Retana)	2014	—	—	—	—	—	—	—		Non-album singles
"Hold You"	2015	21	55	—	195	—	—	—		Non-album singles
"Unicorn" (with Natasha Bedingfield)	2016	—	—	—	—	—	—	—		Non-album singles
"Gotta Be Love" (featuring Nat Conway)	2018	—	—	—	—	—	—	—		Non-album singles
"Sexy" (featuring Nat Conway)	2018	—	—	—	—	—	—	—		Non-album singles
"Blister" (with Peter Luts)	2018	—	—	—	—	—	—	—		Non-album singles
"For You" (featuring Comet Blue)	2019	—	—	—	—	—	—	—		Non-album singles
"Your Love"	2019	—	—	—	—	—	—	—		Non-album singles
"Play It Again"	2019	—	—	—	—	—	—	—		Non-album singles
"Tell Me"	2019	—	—	—	—	—	—	—		Non-album singles
"Better Together"	2019	—	—	—	—	—	—	—		Non-album singles
"Gaia"	2019	—	—	—	—	—	—	—		Non-album singles
"Bring Me To Life"	2019	—	—	—	—	—	—	—		Non-album singles
"Spitfire" (with Peter Luts)	2019	—	—	—	—	—	—	—		Non-album singles
"All About You"	2019	—	—	—	—	—	—	—		Non-album singles
"Alright"	2019	—	—	—	—	—	—	—		Non-album singles
"Acabou"	2020	—	—	—	—	—	—	—		Non-album singles
"The One" (featuring Comet Blue)	2020	—	—	—	—	—	—	—		Non-album singles
"I Don't Know"	2020	—	—	—	—	—	—	—		Non-album singles
"Balanca"	2020	—	—	—	—	—	—	—		Non-album singles
"Wish For It"	2020	—	—	—	—	—	—	—		Non-album singles
"Ochiba"	2020	—	—	—	—	—	—	—		Non-album singles
"Remember"	2020	—	—	—	—	—	—	—		Non-album singles
"Howsid"	2020	—	—	—	—	—	—	—		Non-album singles
"The Austin Shuffle"	2020	—	—	—	—	—	—	—		Non-album singles
"Summer Nights"	2020	—	—	—	—	—	—	—		Non-album singles
"Changes"	2020	—	—	—	—	—	—	—		Non-album singles
"Walking Funny"	2020	—	—	—	—	—	—	—		Non-album singles
"I Miss You"	2020	—	—	—	—	—	—	—		Non-album singles
"Close to Me"	2020	—	—	—	—	—	—	—		Non-album singles
"Dangerous Stuff"	2020	—	—	—	—	—	—	—		Non-album singles
"Destroy"	2021	—	—	—	—	—	—	—		Non-album singles
"—" denotes a recording that did not chart or was not released in that territory.

==== As featured artist ====
List of singles as featured artist, with selected chart positions and certifications, showing year released and album name
Title	Year	Peak chart positions								Certifications	Album
Title	Year	AUS	BEL (VL)	BEL (WA)	IRE	NLD	SCO	UK	UK R&B	Certifications	Album
"Out There" (John Dahlbäck featuring Basto)	2008	—	56	—	—	—	—	—	—		Non-album single
"212" (Azealia Banks featuring Lazy Jay)	2011	68	17	34	7	17	12	12	3	BPI: Platinum	1991 (EP) and Broke with Expensive Taste
"—" denotes a recording that did not chart or was not released in that territory.

=== Remixes ===
2010

- AnnaGrace – Love Keeps Calling (Basto Remix)
- Angellisa – Hard to Breathe (Lazy Jay Remix)

2011

- Lasgo – Hold Me Now (Basto Remix)
- Sander Van Doorn featuring Carol Lee – Love Is Darkness (Basto Remix)
- Ian Van Dahl – Just A Girl (Basto Remix)
- Kylie Minogue – Put Your Hands Up (Basto Remix)
- Moby – The Day (Basto Remix)
- Adrian Lux featuring The Good Natured – Alive (Basto Remix)

2012

- Ed Sheeran – Drunk (Lazy Jay's Wasted in London Remix)
- The Wanted – Warzone (Basto Remix)
- Labrinth – Express Yourself (Lazy Jay Remix)
- Chic Flowerz – Gypsy Woman (Basto Remix)
- Starkillers and Nadia Ali – Keep It Coming (Basto Remix)
- Lil Jon featuring LMFAO – Drink (Lazy Jay Remix)
- Flo Rida featuring Sia – Wild Ones (Basto Remix)
- Spandau Ballet vs. Basto – Gold 2012

2013

- Basto vs. Keane – Bend and Break (Basto Remix)

2016

- Cleo – Zabiorę Nas (Basto Remix)
