= Crown (Azealia Banks song) =

Promotional single by Azealia Banks

from the album Slay-Z (Re-release)
- Released: February 17, 2017
- Recorded: 2015
- Genre: Electronic
- Length: 3:44
- Label: Chaos & Glory Recordings
- Songwriters: Azealia Banks; Lunice
- Producer: Lunice

Azealia Banks promotional singles chronology
ATM Jam (2013)	Crown (2017)	Movin' On Up (2018)

"Crown" is a song recorded by Azealia Banks. It was released on February 17, 2017. Production of the song was handled by Lunice, while the song was penned by Banks alone.

== Background and release ==
Banks announced the song via her private Twitter account. It features production from Canadian producer Lunice, whom previously collaborated with Banks on her song "Runnin'", which was featured on her first mixtape Fantasea.

Crown was released to online streaming company, SoundCloud on February 17, 2017, after teasing the single on Twitter. The song has since garnered over 200 thousand plays on the web site. On July 12, 2017, it was released to iTunes and other online music stores via Chaos & Glory Recordings; it was included in the reissue of Banks' 2016 mixtape Slay-Z.

== Critical reception ==
Upon release, "Crown" has received generally positive reviews by critics. A writer for XXL described the single as "an instrumental that sounds like rapid squirting from a bottle of lotion and a drum beat, Azealia flies into a rapid-fire flow, stunting on anyone who’d dare doubt her flyness". Maya Lewis' critical consensus, writing for The Fader, states, "This poppy electronic track might remind you why she’ll always be your problematic fave". Sheldon Pearce, writing for Pitchfork, gave his mixed feelings on his track by stating, "the track is marred by beat shifts often sound more like interruptions than change-ups, with Banks awkwardly oscillating between vicious raps and busts of song... The song is redeemed by her flow, which can navigate the nooks and crannies in any production. She slips nimbly between synth notes with a breathless cadence, unabated and in control".

== Release history ==
Country	Date	Format	Label	Ref.
Worldwide	February 17, 2017	Streaming	Self-released	
Worldwide	July 12, 2017	Digital download	Chaos & Glory Recordings	
