= Rock with You (disambiguation) =

"Rock with You" is a 1979 song by Michael Jackson.

Rock with You may also refer to:

- "Rock with You" (BoA song), 2003
- "Rock with You" (Basto song), 2006
- "Rock with You" (Seventeen song), 2021
- "Rock with You", Inner Circle song, 1992
- "Rock with You", Ateyaba song, 2018
- "Rock with You", MoStack song, from Stacko (2019)
- "Rock Witchu", PrettyMuch song, 2019
- "Rock Wit U", a song by Alicia Keys on the album Songs in A Minor, 2001

== See also ==
- "Rock with U", 2008 single by Janet Jackson
- "Rock wit U (Awww Baby)", 2003 single by Ashanti
- "Rock Wit'cha", 1989 single by Bobby Brown
