= Jumanji (song) =

Promotional single by Azealia Banks

from the album Fantasea
- Released: May 11, 2012
- Genre: Tropical
- Length: 2:55
- Label: Self-released
- Songwriters: Azealia Banks; Hudson Mohawke; Nick Conceller
- Producers: Hudson Mohawke; Nick Hook

"Jumanji" is a song recorded by American hip hop artist Azealia Banks for her debut mixtape, Fantasea (2012). The song was released as a free promotional single, available for digital download and streaming via Banks's SoundCloud, on May 11, 2012. "Jumanji" is composed as a tropical track with musical influences including kuduro, dancehall, and calypso music. Instrumentally, the song features a trumpet, a timpani, a harp, and calypso steel drums. The song also features Banks rapping over a beat that was compared by music critics to the work of English musician and producer, M.I.A. Lyrically, the song describes Banks' involvement in media scandals and, as she described, "keeping true to herself". "Jumanji" received acclaim from music critics, who complimented the overall production and Banks's rapping flow. Banks has performed the song live several times, as part of the Mermaid Ball, as well as at the Glastonbury Festival 2013, and Club Nokia in 2015.

== Background and composition ==
"Jumanji" was released on May 11, 2012, via free digital download and streaming. The song was the first promotional single from the Fantasea mixtape, which, at that time, was titled Fantastic.

"Jumanji" is composed as a tropical song. Huw Nolan of Ripe and Marc Hogan of Spin both pointed out elements of calypso music within the song. Josh Hall of The Line of Best Fit commented on Hudson Mohawke's production, stating the production was a "good-time mix of dancehall synth stabs and kuduro-inflected rhythms". In an article about "Jumanji", Grant Trimboli of Under the Gun Review opined that the song had a "Caribbean vibe". Jonah Weiner, in a contribution to Slate, stated that the song's tempo was "about 80 bpm". Weiner went on to state that the song's tempo was "a relaxed pace", and identified "bomb-tick hi-hats" in the song's composition. Instrumentally, several music critics noted calypso steel drums throughout the song. Sarah Pope of NME opined that the song had "ethereal twinkles of a harp". The song also features Banks rapping "lines about media scandals and keeping true to herself" over a beat likened, by critics, to the works of M.I.A. In a review of the song for Spin, music critic Marc Hogan noted the use of "elephantine trumpet blares", a "loudly clanging timpani", and clapping on the track every eighth note. Hogan later categorized "Jumanji", along with Barbadian singer Rihanna's "Birthday Cake", and the Big Sean and Nicki Minaj collaboration, "Dance (A$$)", as "clappers". On a similar note, Andrew Unterberg of Popdust deemed "Jumanji" a "21st-century 'Clapping Song'".

== Critical reception ==
The song received general acclaim from music critics. Brittany Mahaney of ANDPOP praised the song's playful demeanor, and called "Jumanji" a summer anthem. Mahaney further elaborated that the song "practically screams summer with dance worthy steel drums and timpani hits". On a similar note, Jason Lipshutz of Billboard also deemed the song an anthem. Lipshutz also compared Banks's performance in the song to the works of Cam'ron and early Ghostface Killah, claiming it was "a great thing". Using a similar comparison, Jonah Weiner of Slate commented that the song "channels the sort of hip-hop that dominated New York in the early- to mid-'00s—in particular, the triumphal cacophony and inspired gobbledygook of Cam'ron and his Harlem crew, the Diplomats". Weiner went on to commend the track's "comically helter-skelter" percussion, but heavily praised the song's relaxed tempo, stating it "better accommodates kingly rapping". Huw Nolan of Ripe lauded the song, calling it "classic Azealia". Mark Richardson, writing for Pitchfork, gave the song the "Best New Track" honor, stating, "her rapping really functions as the bedrock, the steady pulse for the production (by Hudson Mohawke and Nick Hook) to swirl around". Richardson used the aforementioned metaphor throughout his review, comparing the production on the song to Rustie's mix featured on BBC Radio 1's Essential Mix, before ending the review by saying, "She [Azealia] can rap." Reviewing the song's parent mixtape for the same publication, Marc Hogan lauded the "[sic] rapidfire verses and an instantly quotable 'real bitch, all day/ Uptown, Broadway' hook over what sounds like elephants escaping from an urban zoo". Placing the song on Pretty Much Amazing's "Tracking 2012's Best Songs" list, Genevieve Oliver opined the song exemplified "Azealia's jittery, relentless, rapid-fire energy and smart, sarcastic lyrics" aesthetic. Also writing for Pretty Much Amazing, Drewwmalmuth wrote a review of the track's parent mixtape, and praised "Jumanji", "Nathan", and "Fuck Up the Fun" for being "commercially viable", but lamented that the tracks weren't "aren't as gripping as the highest points of the tape".

== Live performances ==
As part of the Mermaid Ball concert tour's setlist, "Jumanji" was performed several times on the aforementioned tour. Banks performed the song at the Bowery Ballroom on June 4, 2012, as part of her Mermaid Ball tour's setlist, with a pair of athletic backup dancers. Corban Goble of Stereogum criticized the use of dancers, inferring Banks upstaged them, citing, "[sic] it was hard to notice them when they flanked Banks, such was the magnetism of Banks's onstage exercise". Goble also noted the crowd's reaction to the song, stating it "elicited the a satisfied sigh of recognition from the audience when the first bars dropped". Ray Rahman of Entertainment Weekly praised the performance, saying, "Things jumped off when she ripped into her Internet hit 'Jumanji'". Jason Lipshutz of Billboard opined that the performance "thumped like a wild animal". Another time the song was performed was, again, a part of the Mermaid Ball, at the Fonda Theatre on July 14, 2012. Ernest Hardy of the Los Angeles Times lauded the performance, comparing Banks's vocal delivery on both "Jumanji" and "Esta Noche" to that of Lil' Kim's. Hardy continued with his praise, citing, Banks was "owning the crowd", and that her "breath control was impeccable". Another performance of "Jumanji" was on October 13, 2012, at the Sea Life Centre London Aquarium in London. In an article about the show written for MTV UK's website, Emma Knock called the lyrics to the performance a "real crowd pleaser", and noticed the crowd "did their best to sing along to the likes of 'Jumanji'".

Banks performed "Jumanji" as part of her setlist on "the Other Stage", on day two at the Glastonbury Festival 2013. Gigwise deemed the performance as "gloriously grimey" and said that it made "sweaty swathes krunk like there's no tomorrow".

"Jumanji" was included on Banks's set list for a performance at Club Nokia on April 19, 2015, described by Entertainment Voice as a "high octane rendition".

== Credits and personnel ==
Credits adapted from the BMI repertoire and Banks's SoundCloud page.

- Azealia Banks (credited on the BMI website with her birth name, Azealia Amanda Banks) – lead vocals, songwriting
- Hudson Mohawke (credited on the BMI website with his birth name, Ross Matthew Birchard) – songwriting, production
- Nick Conceller (credited on the BMI website with his birth name, Nicholas Conceller) – songwriting
- Nick Hook – production

== Release history ==
Region	Date	Format	Label
Worldwide	May 11, 2012	Digital download; streaming	Self-released
