= Lemuria (disambiguation) =

Lemuria is a hypothetical land mass in the Indian Ocean.

Lemuria may also refer to:

- Lemuria (festival), in Roman religion, a domestic ritual to appease the unwholesome and malevolent spectres of the restless dead (lemures)

== Fiction ==
- Lemuria (comics), two fictional locations in comic books published by Marvel Comics
- Lemuria, a mysterious hidden island in the video game series Golden Sun
- Lemuria, a 2004 RPG world designed for the d20 Modern game by Swedes Anders Blixt and Krister Sundelin
- Lemuria (Transformers), one of four missing spaceships in the animated television series Transformers: Cybertron
- Lemuria, a character in the reality TV series Who Wants to Be a Superhero?
- Lemuria, a map of Champions Online

== Music ==
- Lemuria (American band), an indie/punk band from Buffalo, New York, USA
- Lemuria (Belgian band), a Belgian black folk metal band
- Lemurian (album), a 2008 album by Lone
- Lemuria (album), a 2004 album by Therion, or the title song
- Lemuria, the tenth track of the album, Ext16.05 Original Soundtrack VOL.1, made for AlphaVer, an ARG of Minecraft, heard in-game as a music disc.

== See also ==
- Lemurians (disambiguation)
- Lemur (disambiguation)
