= Galaxy Garden =

Studio album by Lone
- Released: 1 May 2012
- Recorded: October 2010 – November 2011 in Manchester.
- Genre: House, bass
- Length: 51:00
- Label: R&S
- Producer: Matt Cutler

Lone chronology
Emerald Fantasy Tracks (2010)	Galaxy Garden (2012)	Reality Testing (2014)

Galaxy Garden is the fifth studio album by Electronic musician Lone released by R&S Records in 2012. The album was recorded between October 2010 and November 2011, and was his first album he made where he found himself making music as a profession opposed to as a hobby. The album's sound is a move away from the more house music oriented sounds of his previous albums and towards a sound more influenced by early 1990s rave music. The album was the first of Lone's to feature guest vocalists.

Galaxy Garden was released on 1 May 2012. A single "Crystal Caverns 1991" was released to promote the album. It received favourable reviews on its release with the BBC, Mixmag and Pitchfork referring to the album as Lone's strongest release.

== Production ==
Galaxy Garden was recorded between October 2010 and November 2011 in Manchester. It was his third full-length studio album. Galaxy Garden was first album that was not done as a side-hobby for Cutler, but as a full-time career as a musician which made it difficult for him to get motivated. Cutler stated that he was "making lots of house-y, kind of 4/4 tunes, and I just got really bored of doing that, but at the same time I didn't have a clue what I was going to do next. I was a few months into this weird spell, and I started to worry". Cutler began working on a track that would become "New Colour" and became inspired by it to take the album in that direction. Cutler spent the rest of the year making new songs with "New Colour" being the jumping point.

The album features vocals from Machinedrum and Anneka. This was the first album of Lone's to use original recorded vocals rather than sampled vocal pieces.

== Composition ==
Galaxy Garden follows a style different from his 2011 EP Echolations (2011), which was house oriented. Unlike previous albums which contained musical references to house and hip hop music, Galaxy Garden was meant to be "reference free" with Cutler stating he was "influenced by nothing".

The album's sound has been compared to rave music, Dummy described the sounds of the album as a "personal interpretation of these familiar [rave] sounds, colours and symbols in a more modern and allusive way."

== Release ==
Galaxy Garden was released on vinyl and compact disc by R&S Records on 1 May 2012. The first single from the album was "Crystal Caverns 1991". Cutler has stated that the songs that didn't make it onto the album were not going to be included on future releases.

== Reception ==
Professional ratings
Aggregate scores
Source	Rating
Metacritic	77/100
Review scores
Source	Rating
AllMusic	4/5 stars
Clash	9/10
Drowned in Sound	8/10
Fact	3.5/5
Mixmag	4/5
Pitchfork	8.2/10
Q	3/5 stars
Resident Advisor	4.0/5
Uncut	7/10
XLR8R	8/10

Initial critical response to Galaxy Garden was positive. At Metacritic, which assigns a normalised rating out of 100 to reviews from mainstream critics, the album received an average score of 77, based on 15 reviews. BBC Music deemed Galaxy Garden to be Lone's best album, adding that it "stands proudly beside sets from Slugabed, Actress and John Talabot as one of "dance"-in-2012's very best albums." Mixmag referred to the album as "easily his most defining moment to date" and wrote that "it's the smart weaves in and out of expectation – the jolts, the swerves – that make it an instant classic." Online music zine Pitchfork shared these views as well, referring to it as "his most complete statement yet".

Drowned in Sound opined that Lone was "delivering the music he always promised" and felt that the "only snag with Galaxy Garden's flow is it can feel too fidgety, with literally everything thrown into the mix". Fact wrote that it was "certainly dividing existing Lone fans" as compared to previous albums, noting that "there are only fleeting moments of reference to Lone's previous preoccupations in classic house and hip-hop".

== Track listing ==
All tracks by Matt Cutler.

1. "New Colour" – 4:39
2. "The Animal Pattern" – 4:26
3. "As A Child" – 5:27
4. "Lying in the Reeds" – 4:31
5. "Dragon Blue Eyes" – 1:11
6. "Crystal Caverns 1991" – 4:53
7. "Raindance" – 4:22
8. "Dream Girl / Sky Surfer" – 5:23
9. "Earth's Lungs" – 4:20
10. "Cthulhu" – 4:28
11. "Stands Tidal Waves" – 1:47
12. "Spirals" – 5:33

== Personnel ==
- Konx-om-Pax – artwork, design wiki
- Matt Cutler – composer, producer
- Matt Colton – mastering
