= Lemurian =

Lemurian or Lemurians or variation, may refer to:

- Lemurian Fellowship, a religious movement
- Lemurian (album), an album by the artist Lone
- Inhabitants of Lemuria (continent), a hypothetical "lost land" variously located in the Indian and Pacific Oceans
  - Lemurians, a hypothetical human root race
- Lemurians, a fictional race of giant lemur relatives from Taylor Anderson's Destroyermen series of books
- Lemurians, a fictional alien species of humanoid lizards from the Risk of Rain game series.

== See also ==
- Lemuria (disambiguation)
- Lemur (disambiguation)
