= Anna Wintour (song) =

2018 single by Azealia Banks

Single by Azealia Banks
- Released: April 6, 2018
- Recorded: 2017–2018
- Genre: Hip house; pop rap
- Length: 4:33
- Label: eOne; Chaos & Glory
- Songwriters: Azealia Banks; Eugenio Sanchez; Dorian Strickland; Kevin James; Shug
- Producer: Junior Sanchez

Azealia Banks singles chronology
"Escapades" (2017)	"Anna Wintour" (2018)	"Treasure Island" (2018)

Music video
- "Anna Wintour" on YouTube

"Anna Wintour" is a song recorded by American singer and rapper Azealia Banks. It was released on April 6, 2018, by eOne and Chaos & Glory as the planned lead single from her mixtape Fantasea II: The Second Wave. Production of the song was handled by Junior Sanchez, while the song was penned by Banks, Sanchez, Dorian Strickland, Kevin James, and "Shug". The song is named after Anna Wintour, the former editor-in-chief of Vogue, and features Banks rap-singing about self empowerment. The music video was released on May 24, 2018, and surpassed 1 million views in 48 hours.

== Production ==
While Banks was signed to Interscope Records, Junior Sanchez was commissioned by the label to do a remix of Banks's song "Ice Princess," from Broke with Expensive Taste (2014), with the working title of the track being "Anna Wintour". This would explain the presence of a sample in the song. One of the initial plans for the song was for it to feature Mel B, however, this concept was ultimately scrapped due to scheduling conflicts. Another concept that Banks had envisioned for the song was for it to feature Nicki Minaj. When discussing her reasoning for the title of the song, Banks stated:

"My choice to name this song 'Anna Wintour' is telling; I relate to Anna Wintour so much as a strong, powerful and larger than life soul in a petite, tidy and feminine body. While others may see Anna as intimidating, I see a woman who was born into this world with an absolute certainty about her place in it."

== Critical reception ==
Shaad D'Souza of the website Noisey stated, "The song is a fun, upbeat vogue track, and it features Azealia rapping and singing some of her sweetest lines ever. "I feel in love babe, I really know that your love is enough," she sings on the chorus, "I'm so lucky you found me in the day." It's beautiful! The song is called "Anna Wintour," I assume, because it's a vogue track, and Anna Wintour is the editor of Vogue. Wordplay! I'm feeling really positive about Fantasea II, and "Anna Wintour" is a great start to a new era for Azealia." Myles Tanzer of The Fader commented on Banks' vocals, stating: "...she hits soulful high notes in the pre-chorus, glides through a pop section with her trademark fluid delivery, screams over the song's breakdown, and even stops to rap a ferocious verse."

Dazed put "Anna Wintour" on its 20 best tracks of 2018 list, saying the song "showed, once again, that the rapper really knows how to make a dance floor anthem. Channeling the energy of Vogue’s iconic editor with the same glow she exhibits while “stuntin’ in front row”, “Anna Wintour” felt like it could have been a real comeback moment for Banks, marking an upwards artistic trajectory as she embarked on her new album." The Line of Best Fit placed it on 25th spot in its Fifty Best Songs of 2018, remarking that "its impossibly catchy 90s house beat plays host to both Banks’ powerful voice and unstoppable bars. It treads the pop/rap line in a way that no other artist is doing in 2018. It feels retro but not dated, and sticks to Banks’ signature sound without feeling too same-old."

Pitchfork ranked it on its 100 best songs of 2018 list, saying that "the rapper’s messy public persona yields the floor to a bracing showcase of her dexterity. She pulls triple duty as house diva, raging wraith, and cold-blooded killer, nailing each part and metabolizing Junior Sanchez’s fiercely generic Ibiza track into a raw energy source. “Anna Wintour” joins “Thank U, Next” and “Honey” among the few songs about self-love released this year that betray greater depth than vapid Instagram inspo, and it offers a reminder of what makes the often-frustrating Banks so great: Like this song’s namesake, she knows how to keep us looking."

== Music video ==
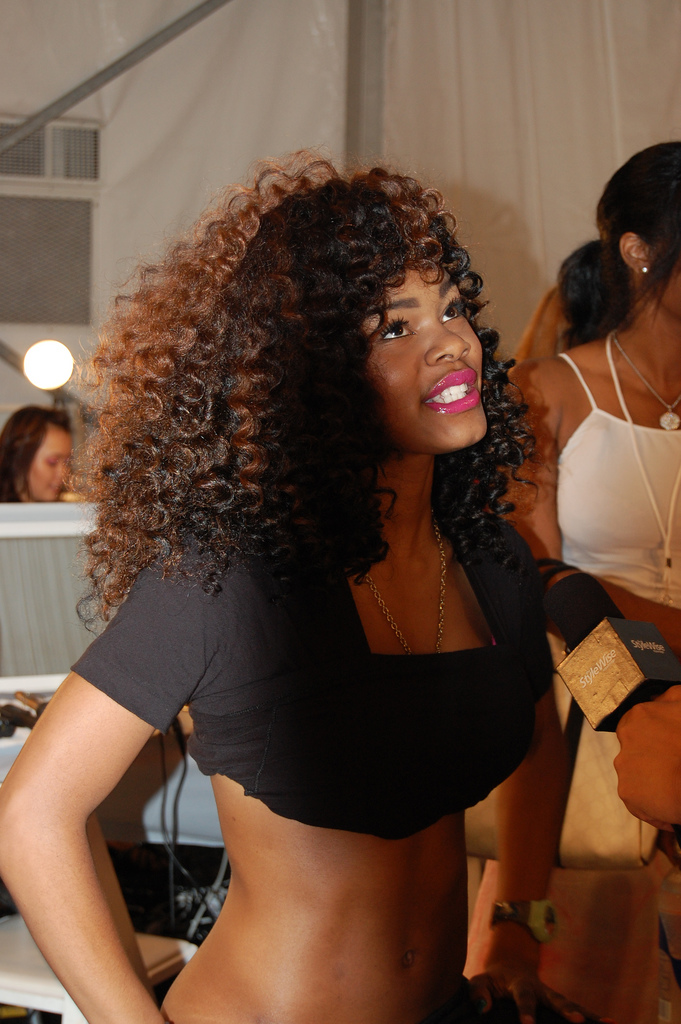
Comparisons to Teyana Taylor's dance for "Fade" ignited a dispute between the two artists

On May 24, 2018, Banks released the music video for "Anna Wintour". The video features Banks in and around an abandoned warehouse dancing and was directed by choreographer and long time backup dancer Matthew Pasterisa. Prior to the music video's release, Banks responded to accusations that her music video was too similar to Kanye West's 2016 video for "Fade", claiming that Teyana Taylor stole the choreography from Pasterisa and didn't give him credit until lawyers were involved. Taylor denied these claims and called on Pasterisa to comment, to which he said he wasn't directly involved with "Fade" but received credit regardless.

== Track listing ==
- Digital download
1. "Anna Wintour" – 4:33

== Charts ==
Chart (2018)	Peak position
US Hot Dance/Electronic Songs (Billboard)	24
