= Love Beats Rhymes =

- Theatrical release poster
- Directed by: RZA
- Written by: Nicole Jefferson-Asher
- Produced by: Jennifer Booth; Natalie Galazka; Paul Hall; Michael Paseornek; Peter Soldo
- Starring: Azealia Banks; Lucien Laviscount; Jill Scott; John David Washington; Common; Lorraine Toussaint; Hana Mae Lee
- Cinematography: Joseph White
- Edited by: Bruce Cannon; Maysie Hoy
- Music by: Richard Gibbs
- Production companies: CodeBlack Films; Spoken Productions
- Distributed by: Lionsgate
- Release date: December 1, 2017
- Running time: 106 minutes
- Country: United States
- Language: English

Love Beats Rhymes is a 2017 American musical drama film directed by RZA. The film stars Azealia Banks as Coco Ford, a 25-year-old rapper from Staten Island, New York who wants to pursue a music career. The film also co stars Lorraine Toussaint, Jill Scott, Lucien Laviscount, MC Jin, Hana Mae Lee, John David Washington and Common. The film was released on December 1, 2017 by CodeBlack Films and Lionsgate.

== Cast ==
- Azealia Banks as Coco Ford
- Lucien Laviscount as Derek, Coco's love interest
- Jill Scott as Professor Dixon
- Lorraine Toussaint as Nichelle, Coco's mother
- John David Washington as Mahlik
- Hana Mae Lee as Julie
- Common as Coltrane
- MC Jin as Jin
- Jeremie Harris as Matt
- Esperanza Spalding as Herself
- Monna Sabouri as Girl
- Mary Christina Brown as Sapphire
- Caleb Eberhardt as Reasons

== Production ==
On May 26, 2015, it was announced that Azealia Banks will be making her feature film debut in Coco directed by Rza and produced by Lionsgate. Lorraine Toussaint, Common, Jill Scott, Hana Mae Lee, and Lucien Laviscount were also cast. Filming began in New York City in late May 2015 in Wagner College, Staten Island and concluded in late June 2015. An initial March 11, 2016 release date was pushed back to a date still undetermined. When referring to the film in a June 2016 interview, RZA told Rolling Stone that "Coco is done. It's in Lionsgate's hands now. Movie companies have to figure out the best time to put their movies out. Date has been not fixed."

== Release ==
On October 11, 2017, Lionsgate released a trailer for the film, now with the new title Love Beats Rhymes and a new December 1, 2017 release date in selected theaters and video on demand formats.

== Reception ==
On review aggregator Rotten Tomatoes, the film holds an approval rating of 44% based on 9 reviews, with an average rating of 5.13/10.

== Home media ==
The film was released on DVD on January 2, 2018.
