= Escapades (song) =

2017 song by Azealia Banks

Promotional single by Azealia Banks

from the album Fantasea II: The Second Wave
- Released: June 26, 2017; September 1, 2017 (radio edit)
- Recorded: 2013–2017
- Genre: EDM
- Length: 4:04
- Label: Chaos & Glory Recordings
- Songwriter: Azealia Banks
- Producer: O/W/W/W/L/S

Azealia Banks singles chronology
"Chi Chi" (2017)	"Escapades" (2017)	"Anna Wintour" (2018)

"Escapades" is a song recorded by American rapper Azealia Banks for her planned second album, Fantasea II: The Second Wave. O/W/W/W/L/S handled production of the song, while the song was penned by Banks alone. The original version of the song was released as a free streaming single, on June 26, 2017, to Banks' SoundCloud. A "radio edit" of the song was released to SoundCloud on August 9, 2017. On September 1, 2017, Banks released the final version of the song to iTunes.

== Background ==
The song was originally conceived as the unreleased track "Bizarra", produced by Disclosure, which was intended for Banks' debut studio album Broke with Expensive Taste. Banks has said that she will be solely singing on the track, and has described it as "very orgasmic" although not being "a sexual song," with more singing than rap.

== Reception ==
Anna Gaca, a writer for Spin, described the first two of the three versions of the song as "works-in-progress".

== Track listing ==
- Streaming
1. "Escapades" (48k Monitor Mix) – 3:53
- Streaming
1. "Escapades" (Stereo Mix) – 4:04
- Streaming
1. "Escapades" (Radio Edit) – 4:04
- Digital Download
1. "Escapades" – 4:04

== Release history ==
Country	Date	Format	Label	Ref.
Worldwide	June 26, 2017	Streaming	Self-released	
Worldwide	August 9, 2017	Streaming (Radio Edit)	Self-released	
Worldwide	September 1, 2017	Digital download	Chaos & Glory Recordings	
