= Levitate (Lone album) =

Studio album by Lone
- Released: 27 May 2016
- Label: R&S

Lone chronology
Reality Testing (2014)	Levitate (2016)	Ambivert Tools Volume One (2017)

Levitate is the seventh studio album by English musician Lone, released on 27 May 2016 by R&S Records; it departs from the calm hip house style of his prior album Reality Testing for quicker, psychedelic tracks that are a hybrid of breakbeat, hardcore, and jungle. It was ranked the 16th best album of 2016 by Dummy and the 44th best by Mixmag.

Professional ratings
Aggregate scores
Source	Rating
Album of the Year	74/100
Metacritic	72/100
Review scores
Source	Rating
AllMusic	4/5 stars
DJ Mag	9/10
Exclaim!	7/10
The Irish Times	3/5 stars
Mixmag	8/10
Pitchfork	7.6/10
PopMatters	7/10 stars
Resident Advisor	3.5/5
Spectrum Culture	3.75/5 stars
Uncut	6/10

== Track listing ==
No.	Title	Length
1.	"Alpha Wheel"
2.	"Backtail Was Heavy"
3.	"The Morning Birds"
4.	"Vapour Trail"
5.	"Triple Helix"
6.	"Breeze Out"
7.	"Sleepwalkers"
8.	"Sea of Tranquility"
9.	"Hiraeth"

== Charts ==
Chart (2016)	Peak position
UK Dance Albums (Official Charts)	35
UK Independent Album Breakers (OCC)	16
