= Icy Colors Change =

EP by Azealia Banks
- Released: December 20, 2018
- Recorded: 2017–2018
- Genre: Christmas
- Length: 16:20
- Label: Entertainment One
- Producer: Lone

Azealia Banks chronology
Slay-Z (2016)	Icy Colors Change (2018)	Yung Rapunxel: Pt. II (2019)

Icy Colors Change is the second extended play, and the first holiday project, by American rapper Azealia Banks, released on 20 December 2018 through eOne Music. It contains jazz-infused songs.

== Background ==
"Icy Colors Change" was conceived after the widespread coverage of the release of the title track on December 26, 2017, which sampled "Airglow Fires" by Lone, a long time collaborator of Banks. "I will re-release this on vinyl fully mixed and mastered next Christmas [as] it's a work in progress as a part of a full holiday project I've been working on." Banks also recorded a pop punk cover of "Sleigh Ride", which her label at the time, eOne, removed from the digital version of the EP.

== Track listing ==
Icy Colors Change track listing
No.	Title	Writer(s)	Producer(s)	Length
1.	"Icy Colors Change"	Azealia Banks; Matt Cutler; Chris Young; Isley Juper; Dorian Strickland; Paul Falcone	Lone	5:29
2.	"What Are You Doing New Year's Eve"	Frank Loesser		5:32
3.	"Have Yourself a Merry Little Christmas"	Hugh Martin; Ralph Blane		5:19
Total length:				16:20
