= DJ-Kicks: Lone =

Compilation album by Lone
- Released: 6 October 2017
- Genre: Club
- Length: 59:24
- Label: Studio !K7

Lone chronology
Levitate (2016)	DJ-Kicks: Lone (2017)

DJ-Kicks chronology
DJ-Kicks: DJ Tennis (2017)	DJ-Kicks: Lone (2017)	DJ-Kicks: Kerri Chandler (2017)

Professional ratings
Aggregate scores
Source	Rating
Metacritic	77/100
Review scores
Source	Rating
Exclaim!	7/10
Pitchfork	7.6/10
PopMatters	7/10

DJ-Kicks: Lone is a DJ mix album by English musician Lone. It was released on 6 October 2017 through Studio !K7 independent record label as part of their DJ-Kicks series.

== Track listing ==
No.	Title	Writer(s)	Length
1.	"Go Hawaii" (featuring Casino Versus Japan)	Matt Cutler	0:45
2.	"Spotted" (featuring Heralds of Change)	Matt Cutler	2:11
3.	"Brooklyn Banks"	Matt Cutler	2:17
4.	"Hold the Floor" (featuring Camu Tao)	Tero Smith	2:47
5.	"Hityawitdat" (featuring Lootpack)	Lootpack	2:15
6.	"Cali Drought"	Matt Cutler	3:01
7.	"Alpha Wheel 4 (Ambient Mix)"	Matt Cutler	1:27
8.	"Orange Romeda" (featuring Boards of Canada)	Marcus Eoin and Michael Sandison	2:11
9.	"U" (featuring Gnork)	Szabolcs Endrody	4:18
10.	"Placid Angels" (featuring John Beltran)	John Beltran	5:40
11.	"Arc (DJ-Kicks)"	Matt Cutler	5:03
12.	"Untitled (Main Mix)" (featuring E. Myers)	E. Myers	4:22
13.	"Double Rainbow" (featuring Protect-U)	Aaron Leitko and Mike Petillo	3:37
14.	"Saturday Night"	Matt Cutler	4:00
15.	"The Outsiders" (featuring Ross from Friends)	Felix Weatherall	4:34
16.	"Bubble Metropolis" (featuring Drexciya)	Gerald Donald and James Stinson	4:10
17.	"Choke and Fly" (featuring Balil)	Ed Handley and Andy Turner	2:16
18.	"Worrywort" (featuring Radiohead)	Colin Greenwood, Jonny Greenwood, Ed O'Brien, Philip Selway and Thom Yorke	4:30
