= 1991 (Azealia Banks EP) =

EP by Azealia Banks
- Released: May 28, 2012
- Recorded: 2011–2012
- Genres: Hip hop; hip house
- Length: 16:06
- Labels: Interscope; Polydor
- Producers: Machinedrum; Jef Martens; Lone

Azealia Banks chronology
| 1991 (2012) | Fantasea (2012) |

Singles from 1991
- 1. "212" Released: December 6, 2011; 2. "Liquorice" Released: June 14, 2012

1991 is the debut EP by American rapper Azealia Banks. It was first released on May 28, 2012, in the United Kingdom through Polydor Records and a day later in the United States by Interscope Records. Its lead single, "212", preceded its release on December 6, 2011. Its second single, "Liquorice", was released on December 4, 2012. Banks also released music videos for every song, including the non-singles "1991" and "Van Vogue".

The EP was not eligible for the UK Albums Chart, but the title track charted at number seventy-nine on the UK Singles Chart. It also reached 133 on the US Billboard 200 on the issue dated June 16, 2012, and number twelve on the Rap Albums chart, number seventeen on the R&B/Hip-Hop Albums chart, and number one on the Heatseekers Albums chart. On release, 1991 received positive reviews from music critics.

== Background ==
Under the name Miss Bank$, she released her first recording "Gimme a Chance" on the Internet in February 2009. The recording was accompanied by "Seventeen", a track produced by the American DJ Diplo which sampled the Ladytron song "Seventeen". Later that year, Banks signed to the XL Records label and began working with the producer Richard Russell. She left the label later that year due to conflicting ideas.

After leaving XL Recordings, Banks dropped the Miss Bank$ name and became Azealia Banks, which preceded a move to Montreal. Using YouTube as a portal, Banks uploaded several demo tracks, including "L8R" and a cover of "Slow Hands" by Interpol. In September 2011, Banks released her first single "212" as a free digital download from her website; it was released officially on December 6, 2011, as the lead single from one of Banks' future releases.

== Release and promotion ==
Originally scheduled for release on April 17, 2012, 1991 was delayed following the musician's change of management on April 13. The EP's artwork and track listing was published online on May 15, with confirmation that 1991 would be released first on May 28 in the United Kingdom. The project was to be released digitally on May 29 and physically on June 12 in the United States, she announced on Twitter. In 2013, 1991 was certified gold by the Australian Recording Industry Association (ARIA), having shipped 35,000 units in Australia.

The original track listing had three tracks: the single "212", "1991" and "Grand Prix". Following the delay, it was extended to a four-track EP, with the tracks "Liquorice" and "Van Vogue" in place of "Grand Prix". Banks confirmed on Twitter that she had re-written "Grand Prix", produced by Lone, and it would feature on her debut studio album Broke with Expensive Taste under the new title of "Miss Camaraderie".

The EP's lead single, "212", was first released in the United Kingdom on December 6, 2011. The track, which samples and credits "Float My Boat" by Lazy Jay, had some chart success in Europe, reaching number seven on the Irish Singles Chart and number twelve on the UK Singles Chart. "Liquorice" was released as the second single on June 14, 2012, also using "Pineapple Crunch" by LONE as the beat. To promote the 1991 EP, she performed at Hackney Weekend 2012 and did the Mermaid Ball Tour. At Glastonbury 2013, she performed songs from the EP, her mixtape Fantasea and closed out the festival by performing the lead single "Yung Rapunxel" from her then upcoming album Broke with Expensive Taste.

== Critical reception ==
Professional ratings
Aggregate scores
| Source | Rating |
|---|---|
| Metacritic | 84/100 |
Review scores
| Source | Rating |
| AllMusic | 4/5 stars |
| The Boston Phoenix | 4/4 stars |
| Fact | 3.5/5 |
| HipHopDX | 3.5/5 |
| MSN Music (Expert Witness) | A |
| Pitchfork | 7.7/10 |
| Rolling Stone | 3.5/5 stars |

1991 received widespread acclaim from music critics. At Metacritic, which assigns a normalised rating out of 100 to reviews from mainstream publications, it received an average score of 84, based on nine reviews, indicating "universal acclaim". AllMusic editor David Jeffries was amazed by Banks' lyricism and called the EP a "short house-rap blast". He said Banks "acts as if she had been raised at a classic N.Y.C. loft party, one where you kept dancing and dissing", and found the production "nostalgic ... as if this EP fell through the cracks of the Paradise Garage's sweaty disco floorboards and then evolved in some alternative and fierce universe". Chris Dart of Exclaim! was also impressed by her quick rapping and argued that she "manages a feat that takes most rappers the better part of a career to master: the perfect marriage of bangin', club-friendly beats and smart, crisply delivered lyrics." In his consumer guide for MSN Music, Robert Christgau called "212" the highlight of an EP whose music is minimalist yet skillfully crafted: "quick-tongued, lascivious, catchy, and delighted with itself ... there hasn't been a more pleasurable record all year and probably won't be—not even by her."

In a less enthusiastic review for Rolling Stone, Will Hermes said the four tracks on 1991 "spin hip-hop backwards and forwards", although he felt it was too short. Alex Macpherson of Fact felt the EP is somewhat inconsistent, but he compared Banks favorably to Missy Elliott and stated, "while the quality of the music remains disproportionate to the hype, it does make her bratty rejection of the rap establishment feel that much more thrilling." Pitchfork journalist Lindsay Zoladz called it "another example of Banks' versatile skills", but lamented how "the half-statement of 1991 reminds us that Banks is still an artist in her development stage."

1991 was ranked by Rolling Stone at number 30 in the magazine's list of 2012's 50 best albums, while Time named it the 9th best album of 2012. In a year-end list for The Barnes & Noble Review, Christgau ranked 1991 as the 11th best album of 2012 and the title track as the year's 13th best single.

== Track listing ==
| No. | Title | Writer(s) | Producer(s) | Length |
|---|---|---|---|---|
| 1. | "1991" | Azealia Banks; Kevin James; Travis Stewart | Machinedrum | 3:30 |
| 2. | "Van Vogue" | Banks; Stewart | Machinedrum | 5:57 |
| 3. | "212" (featuring Lazy Jay) | Banks; Jef Martens | Lazy Jay | 3:24 |
| 4. | "Liquorice" | Banks; Matthew Cutler | Lone | 3:18 |

1991 – Vinyl edition
| No. | Title | Writer(s) | Producer(s) | Length |
|---|---|---|---|---|
| 1. | "1991" (A1) | Banks; James; Stewart | Machinedrum | 3:30 |
| 2. | "Liquorice" (A2) | Banks; Cutler | Lone | 3:18 |
| 3. | "212" (featuring Lazy Jay) (B1) | Banks; Martens | Lazy Jay | 3:24 |
| 4. | "Van Vogue" (B2) | Banks; Stewart | Machinedrum | 5:57 |

== Charts ==
| Chart (2012–13) | Peak position |
|---|---|
| Australia (ARIA) | 63 |
| Australia Urban (ARIA) | 10 |
| Ireland (IRMA) | 97 |
| UK Singles (Official Charts Company) | 79 |
| US Billboard 200 | 133 |
| US Heatseekers Albums (Billboard) | 1 |
| US Top Rap Albums (Billboard) | 12 |
| US Top R&B/Hip-Hop Albums (Billboard) | 17 |

== Certifications ==
| Region | Certification | Certified units/sales |
|---|---|---|
| Australia (ARIA) | Gold | 35,000^{^} |
^{^} Shipments figures based on certification alone.

== Release history ==
| Region | Date | Format | Label | Ref. |
|---|---|---|---|---|
| Australia | May 28, 2012 | Digital download | Polydor | |
| Belgium | May 28, 2012 | Digital download | Polydor | |
| United States | May 28, 2012 | Digital download | Polydor | |
| United States | June 12, 2012 | Vinyl | Interscope | |
| Australia | June 12, 2012 | Vinyl | Polydor | |
| Europe | June 12, 2012 | CD | Interscope; Universal Music Germany | |
| United States | June 12, 2012 | CD | Interscope | |
