= I Rave You =

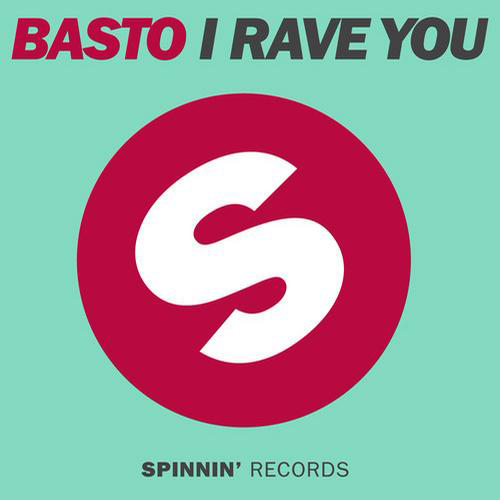

Single by Basto

from the album Live Tonight
- Released: 28 May 2012
- Recorded: 2012
- Genre: Electro house
- Length: 3:29
- Label: Spinnin' Records
- Songwriter(s): Jef Martens
- Producer(s): Jef Martens

Basto singles chronology
| "CloudBreaker" (2012) | "I Rave You" (2012) | "StormChaser" (2013) |

"I Rave You" is a song by Belgian house producer, DJ Basto. It was released in May 2012 as a single across Europe.

== Track listings ==
Digital download
| No. | Title | Length |
|---|---|---|
| 1. | "I Rave You" (Radio Edit) | 3:29 |
| 2. | "I Rave You" (Original Mix) | 5:25 |

== Chart performance ==
=== Weekly charts ===
| Chart (2012–13) | Peak Position |
|---|---|
| Belgium (Ultratip Bubbling Under Flanders) | 33 |
| Belgium (Ultratip Bubbling Under Wallonia) | 6 |
| Czech Republic (Rádio – Top 100) | 45 |
| France (SNEP) | 29 |
| Hungary (Dance Top 40) | 33 |
| Netherlands (Single Top 100) | 96 |

=== Year-end charts ===
Year-end chart performance for "I Rave You"
| Chart (2013) | Position |
|---|---|
| Russia Airplay (TopHit) | 97 |
