= Konx-Om-Pax =

Scottish electronic musician and graphical artist

Konx-om-Pax (born Tom Scholefield) is a Scottish electronic musician and graphical artist from Glasgow.

Scholefield has done graphic design and animation for musicians and record labels, the latter including Brainfeeder, Hyperdub, and LuckyMe. Musicians for whom he has done animations include Hudson Mohawke, Lone, Mogwai, Jamie Lidell, and Martyn; his sleeve designs have been used by Oneohtrix Point Never, Rustie, and King Midas Sound.

As Konx-om-Pax, Scholefield released a full-length album, Regional Surrealism, on the label Planet Mu in 2012. Stuart Braithwaite of Mogwai makes an appearance on the record. A second full-length album, Caramel, was released in 2016, also on Planet Mu. Scholefield released the EP Refresher in 2017.

In 2019, he released his third album, Ways of Seeing, following it with an EP of remixes, Return to Cascada, in 2020.

== Discography ==
=== Studio albums ===
- Regional Surrealism (2012)
- Caramel (2016)
- Ways of Seeing (2019)

=== Extended plays ===
- Refresher (2017)
- Return to Cascada (2020)
