= Reality Testing (album) =

Studio album by Lone
- Released: 16 June 2014
- Genre: Electronic, instrumental hip hop, house
- Label: R&S
- Producer: Matt Cutler

Lone chronology
Galaxy Garden (2012)	Reality Testing (2014)	Levitate (2016)

Reality Testing is the sixth album by English electronic musician Lone. It was released in the United Kingdom, on 16 June 2014, by R&S Records.

== Style ==
Reality Testing focuses on "dusty hip-hop grooves of auteurs like J Dilla and Madlib". A review in Pitchfork referred to the album as "Largely abandoning rave’s warp-speed tempos and sensual overload" of Galaxy Garden.

== Release ==
The album was released on R&S Records on 16 June 2014 on vinyl record and compact disc.

Also reissued by R&S Records on 7 December 2018 as a limited edition of 300, pressed on Clear Vinyl

== Reception ==
Professional ratings
Aggregate scores
Source	Rating
AnyDecentMusic?	7.4/10
Metacritic	81/100
Review scores
Source	Rating
AllMusic	4/5 stars
DIY	4/5 stars
Exclaim!	9/10
Fact	4/5
The Guardian	4/5 stars
Mixmag	5/5
NME	8/10
Pitchfork	8.0/10
Q	4/5 stars
Resident Advisor	4.0/5

At Metacritic, which assigns a normalized rating out of 100 to reviews from mainstream critics, the album received an average score of 81, based on 17 reviews, indicating "universal acclaim".

Pitchfork stated that "Reality Testing is Cutler’s easiest listen—you can imagine this music playing over coffee shop speakers as much as you could put a rapper on top of it—and as such it may seem less innovative when placed up against his previous two full-lengths."

== Track listing ==
No.	Title	Length
1.	"First Born Seconds"	1:55
2.	"Restless City"	4:37
3.	"Meeker Warm Energy"	4:00
4.	"Aurora Northern Quarter"	4:04
5.	"2 Is 8"	3:43
6.	"Airglow Fires"	6:02
7.	"Coincidences"	3:35
8.	"Begin to Begin"	5:35
9.	"Jaded"	4:49
10.	"Vengeance Video"	5:19
11.	"Stuck"	2:39
12.	"Cutched Under"	6:10

== Personnel ==
- Matt Cutler – composer, producer
- Konx-om-Pax – artwork
- Noel Summerville – mastering

== Charts ==
Chart (2014)	Peak position
Belgian Albums (Ultratop Flanders)	99
UK Albums (OCC)	137
UK Dance Albums (OCC)	20
UK Independent Albums (OCC)	21
US Heatseekers Albums (Billboard)	50
