= Zenzealia =

Studio album by Azealia Banks
- Released: April 21, 2026
- Genres: Guided meditation; spoken word; ambient
- Length: 66:19
- Label: Pleasure Place
- Producers: Azealia Banks; Kornél Kovács

Azealia Banks chronology
Yung Rapunxel Pt. II (2019)	Zenzealia (2026)

Zenzealia is the second studio album by American rapper Azealia Banks, self-released on April 21, 2026, under the limited liability company Pleasure Place. It is technically her first full-length release since her mixtape Yung Rapunxel Pt. II (2019), and her second album following Broke with Expensive Taste (2014). Co-produced with Swedish DJ Kornél Kovács, the album marks a significant stylistic departure from Banks' previous work, consisting of an hour-long spoken guided meditation that was described as highly unexpected by critics.

== Background ==
Banks had recently drawn widespread criticism for comments related to the Jeffrey Epstein case, and for her staunch support for Israel and zionism during the Gaza war. One month before the release of Zenzealia, Banks tweeted that she was unable to make new music because "unfortunately nobody will work with me now. The only people who will are all in Tel Aviv."

== Composition ==
Spanning ten tracks, Zenzealia guides the listener through a meditative experience incorporating body relaxation, deep breathing and energy work, with references to chakras and color visualization, and themes of mental serenity, self-esteem and emotional renewal.

== Critical reception ==
Spanish publication Jenesaispop declared that, despite being unexpected, Zenzealia had "quite beautiful soundscapes" and that Banks "turns out to have a good voice for the role", while the American critic Anthony Fantano described it as the "worst album of 2026 so far".

== Track listing ==
All tracks are written by Azealia Banks.

Zenzealia track listing
No.	Title	Length
1.	"Intro"	6:32
2.	"Inner Monologue"	6:48
3.	"Spine"	2:57
4.	"State of Relaxation"	6:55
5.	"Sacral"	6:59
6.	"Solar Plexus"	11:32
7.	"Heart"	6:52
8.	"Throat"	5:46
9.	"Third Eye"	7:26
10.	"Crown"	4:32
Total length:		66:19
