= 212 (song) =

2011 single by Azealia Banks featuring Lazy Jay

Single by Azealia Banks featuring Lazy Jay

from the EP 1991
- Released: December 6, 2011
- Recorded: 2011
- Genre: Hip house; Dutch house; hardcore hip-hop
- Length: 3:24
- Label: Self-released
- Songwriters: Azealia Banks; Jef Martens
- Producer: Lazy Jay

Azealia Banks singles chronology
"212" (2011)	"Liquorice" (2012)

Music video
- "212" on YouTube

"212" (pronounced "two one two") is the debut single by the American rapper Azealia Banks. It was written by Banks and Lazy Jay—the alias of Belgian disc jockey Jef Martens and his brother Toon. Lazy Jay also produced the track. "212" was released on December 6, 2011, as the lead single for Banks' debut extended play, 1991 (2012); it was included as an album track in her debut album, Broke with Expensive Taste (2014). Built around Lazy Jay's track "Float My Boat", it has been described as a hip house, electro house, and dance rap track. "212" reflects Banks' adolescence in Harlem, New York, and features her rapping about cunnilingus.

"212" has received acclaim from music critics, some of whom described it as one of the best tracks of the 2010s, with Billboard recognizing it as one of the songs that "defined the decade". Rolling Stone included it on its list of the 500 greatest songs of all time. Initially released as a free download, "212" achieved commercial success in Europe, reaching the Top 20 in the United Kingdom and charting in the Benelux region. A black-and-white music video was released on September 13, 2011, featuring Banks dancing and rapping to the song in front of a brick wall. It was praised by critics; many publications described it as one of the best music videos of the 2010s.

== Background and release ==
Raised in Harlem, American rapper Azealia Banks began rapping after watching her high school boyfriend and his friends freestyle. She recalls, "I was just writing this little rap on the side. I spit it, and they were like, 'Oh shit, you can rap—you need to do that!'" In 2009, Banks recorded "Gimme a Chance" and "Seventeen" and uploaded them to Myspace under the name Miss Banks. DJ-producer Diplo helped connect her with XL Recordings after she sent him her song "Seventeen", leading the label to fly her to London for a development deal when she was seventeen. However, Banks left the label in 2010 due to conflicting ideas. She used YouTube as a platform to share several demo tracks, including "L8R" and a cover of Interpol's "Slow Hands".

Banks began writing "212" in the middle of 2011, a month before getting evicted from her apartment in Dyckman Street in the Inwood neighborhood north of Harlem. In May 2011, Banks released "212", her debut single, as a free digital download on her website, and officially released it on December 6, 2011. "212" is the lead single from her extended play 1991, which was released on May 28, 2012, and is also featured on Banks' debut studio album, Broke with Expensive Taste, released on November 7, 2014.

== Composition ==
"212"
The track features Banks rapping about lesbian sex and her hometown.

"212" is three minutes and 24 seconds long. The song was written by Banks, Jef Martens and his brother Toon; the latter two are a duo credited by the alias Lazy Jay. Lazy Jay produced the track, while Nick Hook and Ric Mcrae worked as mixing engineers. "212" has been described as a hip house, electro house, dance rap, and rap track. The song, written at 126 beats per minute, samples the musical base of Lazy Jay's "Float My Boat", an instrumental house track. The song title is a reference to the area code 212, which covers Manhattan, New York City, where Banks grew up. According to Pitchfork's Carrie Battan, Banks delivers her vocals with "solid, straightforward flows, guttural yelps, top-shelf singing, triple-X raunch, and a smug talk-rap cadence".

In the first section of "212", Banks raps about cunnilingus, set against electro beats. About halfway through, the beat recedes, which, according to Michael Cragg of The Guardian, allowed Banks to showcase her vocal abilities. In the final section, the beat evolves gradually and merges into a fusion of altered synths. According to James McNally of the Journal of the Society for American Music, "212" "rearticulates the figure of the black female rapper and comments on white attraction to black women and fascination with black cultural forms, both in the realm of hip-hop and in broader American culture". Banks makes multiple references to her place of origin, Harlem, using phrases such as "I was in the 212" and "on the uptown A".

== Critical reception ==
"212" has received rave reviews from critics. Michael Cragg of The Guardian praised the song, describing it as "a startling three and a half minutes of attitude" and calling it "incredible". The Guardian ranked it number two on their list of The Best Songs of 2011. Carrie Battan of Pitchfork named the song Best New Track, lauding Banks' "unpredictable vocal range". Battan wrote, "She clicks between characters and styles casually, effortlessly. No seams. A jaw-slackening demo reel". Thomas H. Green of The Daily Telegraph described the track as "a potty-mouthed sex song that encapsulates the way the current US explosion in EDM has adapted and adopted European rave, mixing the style with hip-hop and R&B stylistic tics". New Musical Express positioned "212" as number eighteen on their 50 Best Tracks Of 2011, calling it "mischievous, quick-witted and full of filthy cunnilanguage [...] it's made Azealia Banks the coolest girl on the planet, and it delivered on 2011's forward-thinking promise".

NPR Music placed "212" in the top five of their 100 Favorite Songs of 2011, dubbing it "the raunchiest shut-down of [the year]"; Pitchfork ranked it ninth, stating, "If it were judged only on its visceral thrill, '212' would still be one of 2011's best, an unashamed banger in a mostly mid-tempo year. But the more you dig into the song, the more you can hear details and decisions that suggest a scary degree of pop talent". In 2019, "212" was placed sixth in Pitchfork's list of the 200 Best Songs of the 2010s. Billboard recognized the song as one of those that "defined the decade". In 2021, Rolling Stone placed it at number 485 on their 500 Greatest Songs of All Time list.

== Music video ==
Banks rapping to Greene, a scene from the music video

The music video for "212" was released on September 12, 2011, via YouTube. The video is three minutes and 25 seconds long. It was filmed by the directors Vincent Tsang and Paul Labonté in Montréal, Canada, where Banks was living at the time.

The video is shot in black-and-white and features Banks wearing a Mickey Mouse sweater and short shorts, dancing and rapping directly to the camera in front of a brick wall. It includes two male supporting roles played by Montréal producers Jacques Greene and Lunice. Greene, wearing glasses and a plain white shirt, maintains eye contact with the camera, displaying a subtle smile and gently nodding his head in rhythm. Positioned on the right side of the frame, Banks engages in both rapping and dancing. At the beginning of the video, she adopts a neutral stance and expression towards Greene; however, as the A section progresses, her demeanor becomes more provocative. She smiles and dances enticingly alongside his left side, culminating in the lyric, "Bet you do want to fuck". Lunice, meanwhile, performs a cheerful, slightly awkward, and subtly effeminate dance, with Banks observing him closely. The video concludes with Lunice, initially unaware of Banks, finally noticing her and appearing somewhat timid.

The music video has been praised by critics, with Rolling Stone including it in their list of The 100 Greatest Music Videos, Billboard naming it one of The 100 Greatest Music Videos of the 2010s, and Pitchfork describing it as one of The 50 Best Music Videos of the Decade in 2014. Rolling Stone described it as a "simple image that created a viral moment that felt equal parts endearing and intimidating", while drag queen Jinkx Monsoon, reviewing for Billboard, described "212" as "one of the most brilliant music videos ever".

== Track listing ==
Digital download

1. "212" – 3:25

== Charts ==
=== Weekly charts ===
Chart (2011–2012)	Peak position
Australia (ARIA)	68
Australia Urban (ARIA)	20
Belgium (Ultratop 50 Flanders)	17
Belgium Dance (Ultratop Flanders)	1
Belgium (Ultratop 50 Wallonia)	34
Belgium Dance (Ultratop Wallonia)	36
Euro Digital Song Sales (Billboard)	16
Ireland (IRMA)	7
Netherlands (Single Top 100)	17
Scottish Singles Sales (Official Charts)	12
UK Singles (Official Charts)	12
UK Hip Hop/R&B (Official Charts)	3

=== Year-end charts ===
Chart (2012)	Peak position
Belgium (Ultratop 50 Flanders)	92
Belgium Dance (Ultratop Flanders)	19
Netherlands (Dutch Top 40)	99
UK Singles (Official Charts Company)	44

== Certifications and sales ==
Certifications and sales for "212"
Region	Certification	Certified units/sales
New Zealand (RMNZ)	2× Platinum	60,000^{‡}
United Kingdom (BPI)	2× Platinum	1,200,000^{‡}
United States	—	250,000
^{‡} Sales+streaming figures based on certification alone.

== Release history ==
Region	Date	Format	Label
United Kingdom	December 6, 2011	Digital download	Self-released
Canada	April 24, 2012	Digital download	Interscope
United States	April 24, 2012	Digital download	Interscope
United States	May 22, 2012	Rhythmic contemporary radio	Interscope

== Bibliography ==
- McNally, James (2016). "Azealia Banks's "212": Black Female Identity and the White Gaze in Contemporary Hip-Hop". Journal of the Society for American Music. 10 (1). Cambridge University Press: 54–81. doi:10.1017/s1752196315000541. ISSN 1752-1963.
