= Lemur (disambiguation) =

A lemur is a Malagasy primate.

Lemur may also refer to:

- Lemur (genus), a genus of lemur containing only the ring-tailed lemur
- Lemurs of Madagascar (book), a field guide published by Conservation International that summarizes what is known about all lemur species
- List of lemur species, a list of all the recognized species of lemur
- Save the Lemur, a conservation campaign
- Lemur-like ringtail possum, a species of Australian marsupial
- Lemures, wandering and vengeful spirits of the dead in Roman mythology
- LMTK2 (lemur tyrosine kinase 2), a human gene
- Lemur (input device), a musical multitouch controller
- Lemur Project, an information retrieval toolkit

LEMUR may refer to:

- Limbed Excursion Mechanical Utility Robot, a rock-climbing autonomous robot being developed by JPL
- League of Electronic Musical Urban Robots, a group of artists and technologists developing robotic musical instruments

== See also ==
- Lemurians (disambiguation)
- Lemuria (disambiguation)
