= Slay-Z =

Mixtape by Azealia Banks
- Released: March 24, 2016
- Recorded: 2014–2016
- Genre: Hip-hop; EDM
- Length: 30:05
- Label: Self-released
- Producer: David Maurice; An Expresso; Benga; Coki; Fame School (Slim & Telli); Guvnor Telli Kray; Jamie Iovine; Kaytranada; Lunice; Tony Igy; Vyle; DJ Yamez

Azealia Banks chronology
Broke with Expensive Taste (2014)	Slay-Z (2016)	Icy Colors Change (2018)

Singles from Slay-Z
- 1. "The Big Big Beat" Released: February 19, 2016

Slay-Z is the second mixtape by American rapper Azealia Banks. It was independently released as a free download on March 24, 2016. The eight-song project features collaborations with Rick Ross and Nina Sky; its production was handled by various musicians, including Benga, Coki, An Expresso, and Kaytranada. On July 12, 2017, it was re-released under Banks' record label, Chaos & Glory Recordings, to the iTunes Store and other online music stores.

== Background ==
Following multiple conflicts with record label Interscope Records, Banks released her debut album Broke with Expensive Taste in November 2014 through Prospect Park. The genre-spanning longplayer garnered positive reviews from music critics, and peaked at number 30 on the US Billboard 200. In July 2015, the rapper announced her departure from the aforementioned company; nonetheless, she revealed the following month that her contract with Prospect Park forbade her from releasing new music until March 2016.

Banks originally devised Slay-Z as a tribute to American rapper Jay-Z. "Can't Do It like Me" was initially composed with American singer Rihanna in mind but was instead released solo. Rick Ross's verse on "Big Talk" was originally intended for a remix of Banks' song "Ice Princess," however it was repurposed for Slay-Z due to label complications.

On March 2, 2016, Banks released "Used to Being Alone" for streaming.

== Release and reception ==
Professional ratings
Review scores
Source	Rating
Exclaim!	6/10
HipHopDX	3.7/5
NME	4/5 stars
Pitchfork	7.4/10
Spin	7/10
Vice	(2-star Honorable Mention)

Prior to the release of the mixtape, Banks deactivated her Twitter handle for sixteen days. The rapper activated it on March 24 in order to announce the release of Slay-Z, which was made available for free download through WeTransfer on that day. She further explained that the release had been motivated by the project's engineer leaking its songs.

Slay-Z received generally positive reviews from critics. At Metacritic, which assigns a normalized rating out of 100 to reviews from mainstream publications, it received an average score of 75, based on seven reviews. Britt Julious from Pitchfork said the mixtape was not as good as Broke with Expensive Taste, but it still "shimmered with Banks' skill and personality", with tracks that were not always consistent but nevertheless engrossing. NME magazine's Joe Levine called it a "blast" and praised Banks' ability to "bounce effortlessly between genres". New York Times critic Nate Chinen said "where no one can really surpass her is in the convergence of raw hip-hop and electronic dance music", as on the songs "Used to Being Alone", "The Big Big Beat", and "Queen of Clubs".

In a less enthusiastic review, HipHopDX writer Trent Clark said while Banks' talent was apparent on Slay Z, filler such as "Along the Coast" and "Used to Be Alone" suffered from poor musical choices; he described the latter track's beat as "an epileptic seizure of techno disharmony". Robert Christgau gave the mixtape a two-star honorable mention in his blog for Vice, indicating a "likable effort consumers attuned to its overriding aesthetic or individual vision may well enjoy". He cited "Along the Coast" and "The Big Big Beat" as highlights while calling Banks the "seriously fluent, seriously flaky rapper as the dancefloor diva you love more than her beats—or, obviously, her tweets".

On July 12, 2017, the mixtape was re-released commercially through Banks' label, Chaos & Glory Recordings.

== Track listing ==
Slay-Z – Standard version
No.	Title	Writer(s)	Producer(s)	Length
1.	"Riot" (featuring Nina Sky)	Azealia Banks; Nina Sky; Leah Hayes; Slim	Fame School (Slim & Telli)	3:38
2.	"Skylar Diggins"	Banks; Slim; Telli	Fame School	3:17
3.	"Big Talk" (featuring Rick Ross)	Banks; Rick Ross; Vyle; DJ Yamez	Vyle; DJ Yamez	2:44
4.	"Can't Do It like Me"	Banks; Jonathan Harris; Benga; Coki	Benga; Coki	2:44
5.	"The Big Big Beat"	Banks; Harris; Jack Fuller; An Expresso	An Expresso	3:36
6.	"Used to Being Alone"	Banks; Fuller; Tony Igy	Tony Igy	2:39
7.	"Queen of Clubs"	Banks; Jamie Iovine; Slim	Jamie Iovine; Slim	4:29
8.	"Along the Coast"	Banks; Fuller; Kaytranada	Kaytranada	3:12

Slay-Z – (Re-release bonus tracks)
No.	Title	Writer(s)	Producer(s)	Length
9.	"Crown"	Banks; Lunice	Lunice	3:44

=== Sample credits ===
- "Can't Do It Like Me" contains elements of "Night", performed by Benga and Coki.
- "Used to Being Alone" contains elements of "Astronomia", performed by Tony Igy.

== Release history ==
Country	Date	Format	Label	Ref.
Worldwide	March 24, 2016	Streaming	Self-released	
Worldwide	July 12, 2017	Digital download	Chaos & Glory Recordings	
