= Lone (musician) =

British electronic musician

- Born: Matt Cutler
- Origin: Nottingham, England
- Genres: Electronic; instrumental hip hop; house; ambient; IDM; breakbeat hardcore; jungle; wonky
- Years active: 2007–present
- Labels: Greco-Roman; R&S; Werkdiscs; Magic Wire; Dealmaker

Matt Cutler, better known as Lone, is a British electronic musician from Nottingham, England.

== Biography ==
Cutler adopted the Lone alias after the dissolution of his previous band, the electronic duo Kids in Tracksuits, in which Cutler performed with Andy Hemsley. His debut release as Lone came in 2007 with Everything is Changing Colour CD-R, followed by another full-length album Lemurian in 2008 on the Dealmaker label. Ecstasy & Friends appeared on the Werk Discs label in 2009. While these releases combined abstract hip-hop beats with electronic textures, Cutler moved towards a more dance-orientated sound with Emerald Fantasy Tracks (2010) and Galaxy Garden (2012). He also has released five EPs titled Cluster Dreams, Joyreel/Sunset Teens, Pineapple Crush/Angel Brain, Once In a While/Raptured and Echolocations EP, released between 2009 and 2011.

Lone has been quoted as saying that the greatest influences on his music are artists such as Boards of Canada and Madlib. He also says that fellow British musician Keaver and Brause (stylized Keaver & Brause) and Bibio have had an effect on the way he makes his music.

Cutler also plays in the side-project Kona Triangle when not working on Lone. Kona Triangle is a collaboration between Keaver & Brause and Lone. Kona Triangle released a record titled Sing a New Sapling into Existence. Its album art was done by HAPPY DAZE.

American rapper Azealia Banks samples "Pineapple Crush" on her debut EP, 1991, for her second single "Liquorice". Banks also used his song "Koran Angel" as an interlude on her mixtape Fantasea and "Aquamarine" for her track "Count Contessa" from her second upcoming album. Cutler produced the songs "Miss Amor" and "Miss Camaraderie" for her debut studio album Broke with Expensive Taste, "Airglow Fires" is sampled on her Christmas EP Icy Colors Change, and "Re-Schooling" is sampled for her song "Playhouse".

British rock band Coldplay used a remix of their song "Midnight" featuring elements of Lone's song "Blue Moon Tree" from Ambivert Tools Vol. 4 on their Music of the Spheres World Tour.

== Discography ==
=== Albums ===
- Everything Is Changing Colour (2007, vu-us)
- Lemurian (2008, Dealmaker Records, 2015, Magic Wire Recordings/R&S Records)
- Ecstasy & Friends (2009, Werk Discs)
- Sing a New Sapling into Existence as Kona Triangle (2009, Porter Records)
- Emerald Fantasy Tracks (2010, Magic Wire Recordings)
- Galaxy Garden (2012, R&S Records)
- Reality Testing (2014, R&S Records)
- Levitate (2016, R&S Records)
- DJ-Kicks: Lone (mix) (2017, !K7 Music)
- My Laptops (2001 - 2006) (2018, Magicwire)
- Greenhills Road Archive Traks Volume One (2020, Ancient Astronauts)
- Greenhills Road Archive Traks Volume Two (2020, Ancient Astronauts)
- Greenhills Road Archive Traks Volume Three (2020, Ancient Astronauts)
- The Light Year Wave Tape (2020, Ancient Astronauts)
- MCR/LDN 20122016 (2020, Ancient Astronauts)
- Always Inside Your Head (2021, Greco-Roman)
- Hyperphantasia (2026, Greco-Roman)

=== Singles and EPs ===
- "Cluster Dreams" (2009)
- "Joyreel/Sunset Teens" (2009)
- "Pineapple Crush/Angel Brain" (2010)
- "Once in a While/Raptured" (2010)
- "Echolocations" (2011)
- "All Those Weird Things" (2011)
- "Cobra" (part of IOTDXI compilation) (2011)
- Outlander (2011)
- "Crystal Caverns 1991" (2012)
- "Airglow Fires" (2013)
- Ambivert Tools Vol. 1 (2017)
- Ambivert Tools Vol. 2 (2017)
- Ambivert Tools Vol. 3 (2018)
- Ambivert Tools Vol. 4 (2018)
- "Smoke Signals" (part of Modeselektor compilation) (2018)
- Icy Colors Change (with Azealia Banks) (2018)
- "Melted (Out of Body Experience)" (2019)
- "Abraxas" (2019)
- "Not Seeing Is a Flower" (2019)
- "Count Contessa" (with Azealia Banks) (2019)
- "Lone X" (with KETTAMA) (2020)
- "Waterfall Reverse" (2023)
- "Triton" (2023)
- "Ascension.png" (2025)
- "Sickly, Sweetly, Summer Movie" (2025)
- "Life Spark" (2026)
- "Miracle Mile" (2026)
