= Fantasea (mixtape) =

Mixtape by Azealia Banks
- Released: July 11, 2012
- Recorded: 2010–2012
- Genres: Hip-hop; witch hop; seapunk
- Length: 56:49
- Label: Self-released
- Producers: AraabMuzik; Diplo; Drums of Death; Eprom; Nick Hook; Ikonika; Liam Howlett; Lunice; Machinedrum; DJ Master D; Hudson Mohawke; Munchi; O/W/W/W/L/S; RRXL; Zebra Katz

Azealia Banks chronology
1991 (2012)	Fantasea (2012)	Broke with Expensive Taste (2014)

Fantasea is the debut mixtape by American rapper Azealia Banks, released as a free download on July 11, 2012.

== Background ==
Banks first announced the possibility of a mixtape on May 10, when she tweeted, "So y'all will be getting, 1991 EP this month, the FANTASTIC mixtape for the summer, and Broke With Expensive Taste, in the Fall". On May 30, Banks took to Twitter again to announce her plans to alter the title of the mixtape from Fantastic to Fantasea. Banks released the album cover of "Fantasea" via Instagram on July 9. Banks later confirmed that Fantasea would have 18 tracks (15 originals and 3 remixes). Via Twitter, Banks spoke on the mixtape saying "Fantasea is almost kind of a first album of sorts....but it happened by mistake.... It's weird". "This is a test run... I tried a lot of cool things... Sounds I thought were progressive, beats made by close friends, different flowsss."

== Critical reception ==
Professional ratings
Review scores
Source	Rating
The Guardian	4/5 stars
MSN Music (Expert Witness)	(2-star Honorable Mention)
Pitchfork	7.6/10
Respect.	favorable
The Source	favorable
Spin	8/10
Sputnikmusic	4/5 stars

Fantasea garnered highly positive reviews from music critics. The Guardian's Graeme Virtue wrote that the mixtape "showcase[s] an artist brimming with ideas" and gave it a rating of four stars (out of five). Spin gave the album a rating of 8 out of 10 and wrote that the album "makes her [Banks] sounds mega-industrious."

== Promotion ==
=== Song releases ===
On May 11, 2012, Banks released the track "Jumanji" online as a free digital download. Produced by Hudson Mohawke and Nick Hook, the track served as the first song set to feature on the upcoming mixtape. A second track, "Aquababe"—produced by EPROM and Machinedrum—was released online on June 13. Ahead of its release on July 11, Banks released a third track, "Nathan" on June 30. Featuring American rapper Styles P, "Nathan" was produced by Drums of Death. Azealia spoke on the song Nathan saying "I'm that rap girl who's out here and doesn't have another rapper behind her, but she's got all this mouth and she's all over the place, So [this collaboration] was cool for me [because I'm like] 'What ya'll gonna say now, when I bust out with that Styles P record?' Ya'll not gon' call me fake and make fun of me for having one song. Yeah, I make lil' dance music and ya'll got jokes, whatever—watch when I come out with the Styles P record." Banks released the song "Neptune" featuring Shystie online on July 10, 2012. She also released music videos for "Luxury" and "Atlantis" on September 27 and November 11, 2012, respectively.

"Esta Noche" was planned to be released as the mixtape's first official single on September 25, 2012, but due to the song's producer, Munchi, refusing to give permission for the track's release, the plans were cancelled.

== Track listing ==
No.	Title	Producer(s)	Length
1.	"Out of Space"	Liam Howlett (Note: The song "Out of Space" samples the track of the same name, originally by The Prodigy.)	2:34
2.	"Neptune" (featuring Shystie)	Ikonika (Note: The song "Neptune" samples the track "Heston", originally by Ikonika)	3:57
3.	"Atlantis"	O/W/W/W/L/S	2:29
4.	"Fantasea"	Machinedrum (Note: The song "Fantasea" samples the track "Fantastix", originally by Machinedrum.)	4:29
5.	"Fuck Up the Fun"	Diplo, DJ Master D	2:25
6.	"Ima Read"	Zebra Katz (Note: The song "Ima Read" samples the track of the same name, originally by Zebra Katz featuring Njena Reddd Foxxx.)	1:02
7.	"Fierce"	Drums of Death (Note: The song "Fierce" samples the track of the same name, originally by Drums of Death, and "Work It Girlfriend" by Jack & Jill.)	3:14
8.	"Chips"	O/W/W/W/L/S	3:48
9.	"Nathan" (featuring Styles P)	Drums of Death	3:24
10.	"L8R"	Machinedrum	2:42
11.	"Jumanji"	Hudson Mohawke, Nick Hook	2:55
12.	"Aquababe"	EPROM & Machinedrum (Note: The song "Aquababe" samples the track "Regis Chillbin (Machinedrum Remix)", originally by Eprom.)	3:45
13.	"Runnin'"	Lunice	3:30
14.	"Us"	O/W/W/W/L/S	2:46
15.	"Paradiso"	RRXL (Note: The song "Paradiso" samples the track "Weekend Special", originally by Brenda and the Big Dudes.)	0:49
16.	"Luxury"	Machinedrum (Note: The song "Luxury" samples the track "Love Come Down", originally by Evelyn King.)	2:45
17.	"Azealia (Skit)"	Lone	1:03
18.	"Esta Noche"	Munchi (Note: The song "Esta Noche" samples the track of the same name, originally by Munchi.)	3:14
19.	"Salute"	AraabMuzik (Note: The song "Salute" samples the track of the same name, originally by AraabMuzik.)	1:27

Fantasea – (Re-release bonus tracks)
No.	Title	Writer(s)	Length
18.	"No Problems"	Azealia Banks	4:14
