= Rock with You (Basto song) =

"Rock With You"

Single by Basto
- Released: 2005
- Recorded: 2005
- Genre: Trance, electro house
- Length: 3:26
- Label: 541
- Songwriter: Jef Martens
- Producer: Jef Martens

Basto singles chronology
"Rock With You" (2005)	"On My Own" (2008)

"Rock With You" was a 2005 hit single by Belgian DJ/producer Jef "Basto!" Martens. After becoming a club hit, the single was picked by Belgian music channel TMF and popular radio stations Donna (Flanders) and Contact (Wallonia). Eventually, it topped the Belgian dance charts in February 2006. A few weeks later, "Rock With You" became Dance Smash of Dutch radio station Radio 538.

A music video was produced. The single was signed by different European labels. Among them were Ministry of Sound for the UK and Australia, Airplay Records for France and Alphabet City for Germany.

== Track listings ==
CD-Single

1. "Rock With You" (Radio Edit) (3:33)
2. "Rock With You" (Original Mix) (5:23)
3. "Rock With You" (NUfrequency Remix) (7:44)
4. "Smokin' Vegas" (7:56)

== Charts ==
Weekly chart performance for "Rock with You"
Chart (2005–06)	Peak Position
Belgium (Ultratop 50 Flanders)	22
Belgium Dance (Ultratop Flanders)	1
Belgium (Ultratop 50 Wallonia)	24
Belgium Dance (Ultratop Wallonia)	1
Netherlands (Dutch Top 40)	23
Netherlands (Single Top 100)	37

Year-end chart performance for "Rock with You"
Chart (2006)	Position
Netherlands (Dutch Top 40)	173
