= Azealia Banks =

American rapper (born 1991)

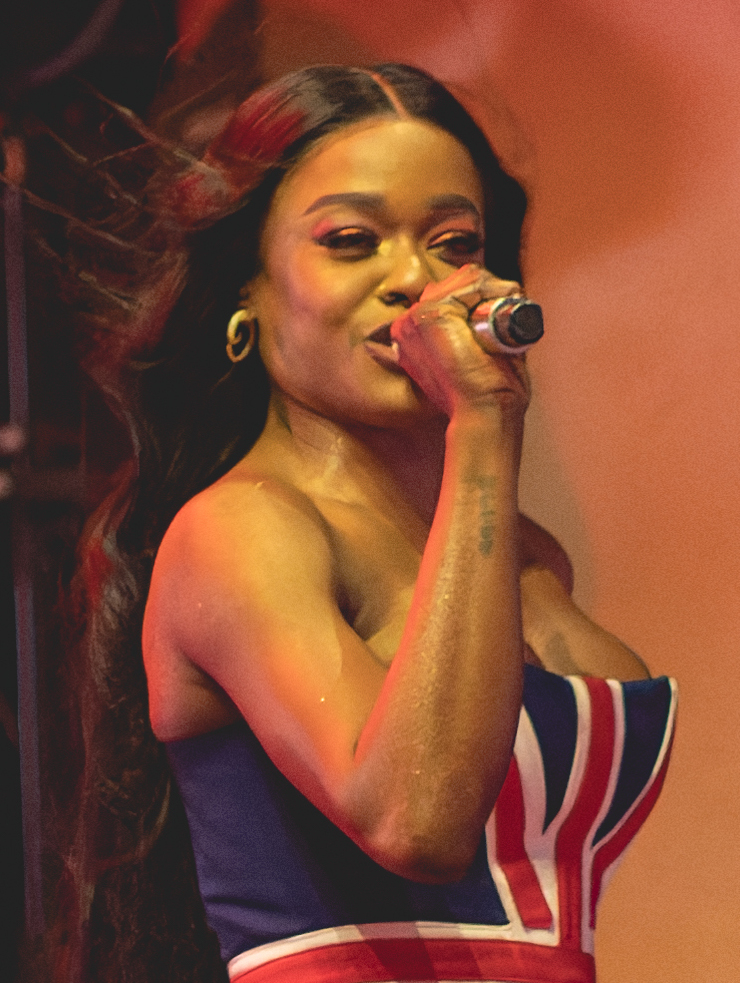
- Banks in 2024
- Born: Azealia Amanda Banks; May 31, 1991 (age 35); New York City, U.S.
- Other names: Miss Bank$; Azilka
- Occupations: Rapper; singer; songwriter; actress
- Years active: 2008–present
- Works: Discography; songs; videography
- Musical career
- Genres: Hip-hop; hip house; pop rap
- Labels: Parlophone; Prospect Park; E1; Chaos & Glory; Interscope; Polydor; XL

Azealia Amanda Banks (/əˈziːliə/ ə-ZEE-lee-ə; born May 31, 1991) is an American rapper, singer, and songwriter. Her debut single "212" became a defining song of the 2010s and appeared on Rolling Stone's list of the "500 Greatest Songs of All Time" in 2021. Banks is also known for her controversial social media presence and outspoken views, which have received significant publicity. Banks was the first and only female on Forbes' inaugural Hip Hop Cash Princes list in 2014, after her tours between 2012-2013 generated over $1 million dollars, only 2 years after the release of "212" and with no debut album. Consequently, she was dubbed 'Hip-Hop's Cash Princess'.

Raised in the Harlem neighborhood of New York City, she began releasing music through Myspace in 2008 before being signed to XL Recordings at age 18. She subsequently signed with Interscope and Polydor Records before separating in 2013. Banks became an independent artist and started her own independent record label, Chaos & Glory Recordings. She later signed to Parlophone and Warner Records before quitting her label in 2023. Banks has released three mixtapes (Fantasea in 2012, Slay-Z in 2016, and Yung Rapunxel Pt.II in 2019), two studio albums (Broke with Expensive Taste in 2014 and Zenzealia in 2026), and two extended plays (1991 in 2012 and Icy Colors Change in 2018). In 2017, Banks had her film debut in the musical drama Love Beats Rhymes, portraying the lead character. Banks's works have garnered acclaim from critics, drawing on various sounds including house, rap, pop, electronic music, and avant-garde.

Throughout her career, Banks has generated controversy for her views on U.S. politics and race, as well as disputes with other artists. She has been accused of homophobia, transphobia, and xenophobia towards multiple nationalities. Complex wrote in 2014 that "she gets more attention for her public feuds than she does for her music".

== Life and career ==
=== Early life and career beginnings ===
Azealia Amanda Banks was born on May 31, 1991, in New York City's Manhattan borough; she was the youngest of three. Her single mother raised her and her two siblings in Harlem, after their father died of pancreatic cancer when she was two years old. Following her father's death, Banks says that her mother "became really abusive—physically and verbally. Like she would hit me and my sisters with baseball bats, bang our heads up against walls, and she would always tell me I was ugly. I remember once she threw out all the food in the fridge, just so we wouldn't have anything to eat." Due to escalating violence, Banks moved out of her mother's home at age 14 to live with her older sister.

At a young age, Banks became interested in musical theater, dancing, acting, and singing. At 16, she starred in a production of the comedy-noir musical City of Angels, where she was found by an agent who sent her to auditions for TBS, Nickelodeon, and Law & Order, all without success. At this point Banks decided to end her pursuit of an acting career, citing the stiff competition and overall sense of nonfulfillment. Because of this lack of fulfillment, she began writing rap and R&B songs as a creative outlet. She never finished high school, instead choosing to embark on a career as a recording artist.

Under the moniker Miss Bank$, she released her debut recording, "Gimme a Chance", online on November 9, 2008. The recording was accompanied by the self-produced track "Seventeen", which sampled the Ladytron song of the same name. Banks sent both tracks to American DJ Diplo. Later that year, she signed a development deal with record label XL Recordings and began working with producer Richard Russell in London, leaving the label later that year due to conflicting ideas.

=== 2011–2012: 1991 and Fantasea ===
Richard [Russell] was cool, but as soon as I didn't want to use his beats, it got real sour. He wound up calling me "amateur" and the XL interns started talking shit about me. It just got real fucking funny. I was like, "I didn't come here for a date. I came here to cut some fucking records." I got turned off on the music industry and disappeared for a bit. I went into a bit of a depression.

— Banks talking of her departure from XL Recordings

After leaving XL Recordings, Banks dropped the 'Miss Bank$' moniker and formally became Azealia Banks, which preceded a move to Montreal. Using YouTube as a portal, she uploaded several demo tracks, including "L8R" and a cover of "Slow Hands" by Interpol. After her Canadian visa expired, Banks returned to New York, where she sold keychains at a Manhattan jazz club and danced at a Queens strip club to make ends meet. "That's when I was really depressed", Banks said. "I don't have a manager, I don't have a boyfriend, I don't have any friends, I don't have any money. Here I am working at the strip club, trying not to say the wrong thing and get into fights with these girls who don't give a shit."

In September 2011, Banks released her debut single, "212", as a free digital download from her website. It was released officially on December 6, 2011, as the lead single from her EP 1991. The track attained moderate European chart success, peaking at No. 14 in the Netherlands, No. 12 in the United Kingdom and No. 7 in Ireland.

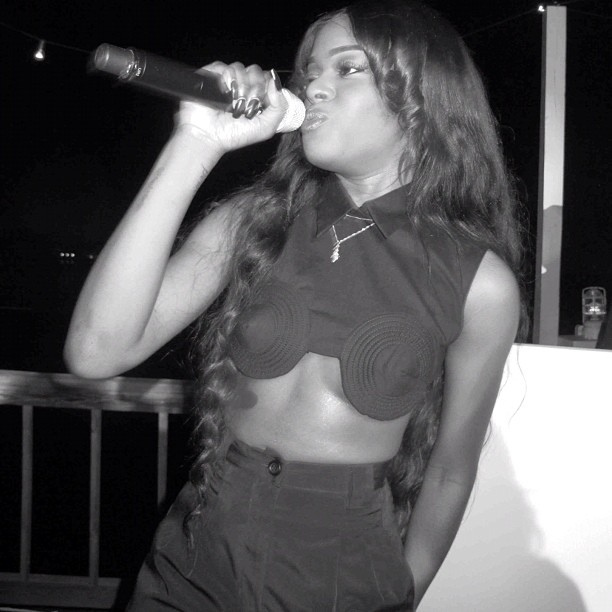
Banks performing at the Art Basel in Miami Beach, 2012

Though unsigned at the time, Banks began working with British producer Paul Epworth on a debut studio album. It was announced in December 2011 that she would feature on "Shady Love", a track on American band Scissor Sisters' fourth studio album, Magic Hour, although the appearance was uncredited. An accompanying video was released in January 2012 following its radio premiere from Annie Mac (BBC Radio 1) on January 4, though the single's release was canceled for unconfirmed reasons. Banks released the track "NEEDSUMLUV (SXLND)" online on January 16, 2012, coinciding with what would have been the 33rd birthday of the late singer Aaliyah, who is sampled on the track. A week later saw the emergence of a second track, "Bambi", produced by Paul Epworth and selected as the soundtrack for a Thierry Mugler fashion show in Paris.

In May 2012, Banks announced plans to release a mixtape—originally titled Fantastic—titled Fantasea. Preceding its release the tracks "Jumanji", "Aquababe", and "Nathan" (featuring rapper Styles P) were made available online. Fantasea was released via Banks's Twitter account on July 11, and described as "thrilling document of a phenomenally gifted performer in a state of flux".

Banks's first EP, 1991, was released in the UK on May 28 and in the US the next day. The 4-track EP, which includes 212, was not eligible for the UK Albums chart, but the title track charted at No. 79 on the UK Singles chart. It also reached No. 133 on the US 200, while reaching No. 17 on the US R&B/Hip-Hop chart, No. 12 on the US Rap chart, and headin' US Heat chart. In 2013, 1991 was certified gold by the Australian Recording Industry Association.

Banks was scheduled to release her second single, "Esta Noche", from Fantasea, on September 25, 2012, but it was pulled the day of its release due to sampling disputes between Banks and its producer, Munchi. Banks collaborated with both Lady Gaga and Kanye West, but these songs remain unreleased. On December 31, 2012, Banks released "BBD", a collaboration with Sup Doodle and Apple Juice Kid.

=== 2013–2016: Broke with Expensive Taste and Slay-Z ===
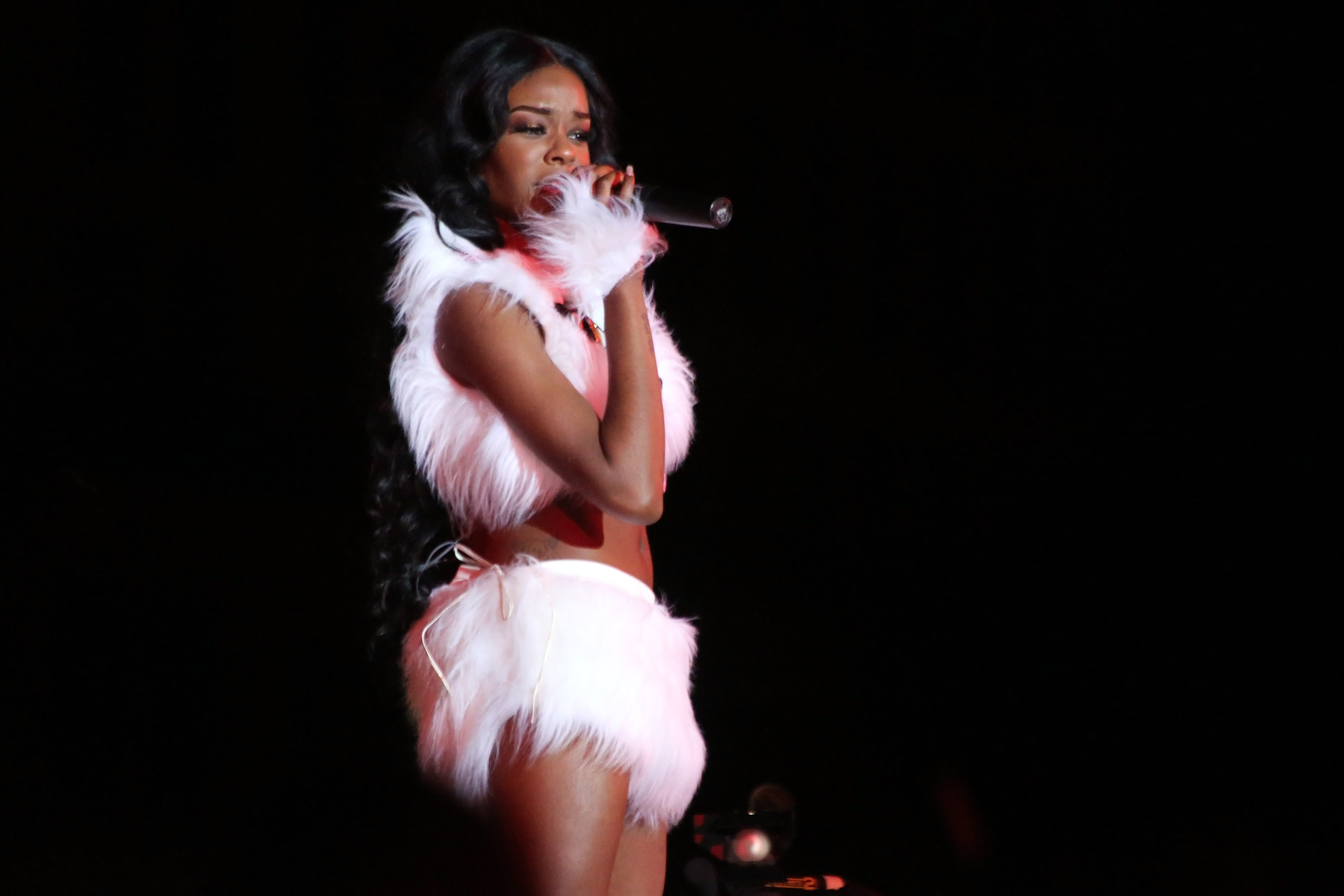
Banks performing at Life Ball 2013

Early in 2012, Banks revealed that her debut album would be called Broke with Expensive Taste, and said it would include contributions from musicians including Toko Yasuda, Theophilus London, Kevin Hussein, and Ariel Pink. She initially said the album's lead single would be a track titled "Miss Amor" and that it would be accompanied by a B-side, "Miss Camaraderie", both produced by Lone, but these plans changed: in January 2013 she announced that the first official single from the album would be "Yung Rapunxel", which was released in March 2013 on SoundCloud.

In May 2013, Banks announced that the second single from Broke with Expensive Taste would be "ATM Jam", featuring Pharrell. On June 29, she debuted the song at the 2013 Glastonbury Festival, with New York City radio station Hot 97 premiering a clean, shortened version of the studio recording three days later. On July 11, the full studio version of "ATM Jam" was released on BBC Radio 1. Banks confirmed in November 2013 that "ATM Jam" would not appear on Broke with Expensive Taste due to negative fan feedback and personal disinterest regarding the song.

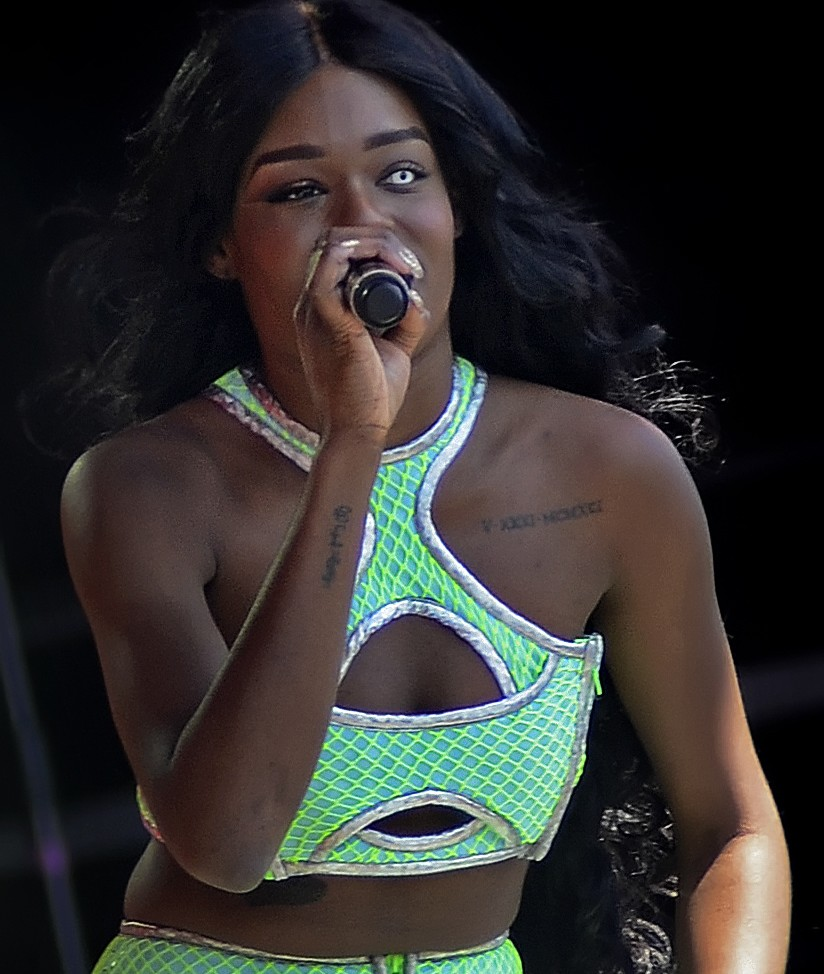
Banks performing at the 2013 Glastonbury Festival

Banks announced in mid-July that after a long battle, she had parted ways with Universal Music Group. She reportedly has possession and the rights to the work she released with Interscope. On July 28, 2014, Banks released the official second single from Broke with Expensive Taste, titled "Heavy Metal and Reflective", on her own label, Azealia Banks Records.

Banks surprise-released Broke with Expensive Taste under Prospect Park on iTunes on November 7, 2014. The physical album was released on March 3, 2015. In 2015, Banks performed at the Coachella Valley Music and Arts Festival and posed nude for the April issue of Playboy, shot by Ellen von Unwerth. In late 2015, Banks revealed that she was unable to release new music until March 2016, due to the separation from her label, Prospect Park, but as of February 2016 she was officially cleared of her contract and able to release new music.

In February 2016, Banks released the single, "The Big Big Beat", with its official video uploaded to Vevo in April. The song would serve as the lead single to Banks's second mixtape, Slay-Z, which was released on March 24, 2016. In July 2017, Slay-Z was reissued to iTunes, Spotify, and other online music stores under her independent record label, Chaos & Glory Recordings. The re-issue would include the Lunice collaboration, "Crown", which was released as the project's sole bonus track.

=== 2017–2019: Icy Colors Change and Yung Rapunzel: Pt. II ===
In early 2017, Banks launched her online store, CheapyXO. The site features artist merchandise from Banks as well as original skin care products. The site also includes "CheapyXO Radio" which links to a playlist curated by Banks herself. Banks would later relaunch the site in 2020 to include her podcast, Cheapy's Two Cents.

Banks announced that her next project will be Fantasea II: The Second Wave, a follow-up to 2012 mixtape Fantasea. On June 5, 2017, Banks released the song "Chi Chi" intended to be the lead single from Business & Pleasure, however, it was later demoted to a stand-alone single. On June 26, 2017, Banks released the promotional single, "Escapades", from the upcoming album Fantasea II: The Second Wave. After a yearlong hiatus from touring, Banks returned to New York City to embark on a North American tour with 20 dates across the U.S. and Canada. The tour began on October 4 in Chicago and concluded on October 31 in San Francisco. Banks also performed across Europe in a handful of shows during 2017.

It was announced in 2015 that Banks would make her acting debut as the main character in the RZA-directed musical drama film Coco (now known as Love Beats Rhymes). The film was officially released on December 1, 2017.

On January 31, 2018, Banks announced that she had signed a US$1 million record deal with Entertainment One. On March 9, 2018, she released "Movin' On Up" to iTunes and other streaming platforms as the second promotional single from Fantasea II: The Second Wave. The song was previously featured in the 2017 film Love Beats Rhymes which Banks starred in. In March 2018, she announced that the first official single from her forthcoming album would be "Anna Wintour". It was released on April 6, 2018, and the official music video for the single was released on May 24, 2018. On July 6, a second single, "Treasure Island", was released. In November, Banks announced on her Instagram account that she would release the Christmas-themed EP Icy Colors Change on December 7. A demo of the title track was released in December 2017. The project was released on December 19 after several delays, with a promotional single, "What Are You Doing New Year's Eve?", released on December 13. Another promotional single from Fantasea II: The Second Wave, "Playhouse", was released exclusively on SoundCloud on April 12, 2019. Banks first teased the track back in 2016 by playing the entire song on the live streaming app, Periscope.

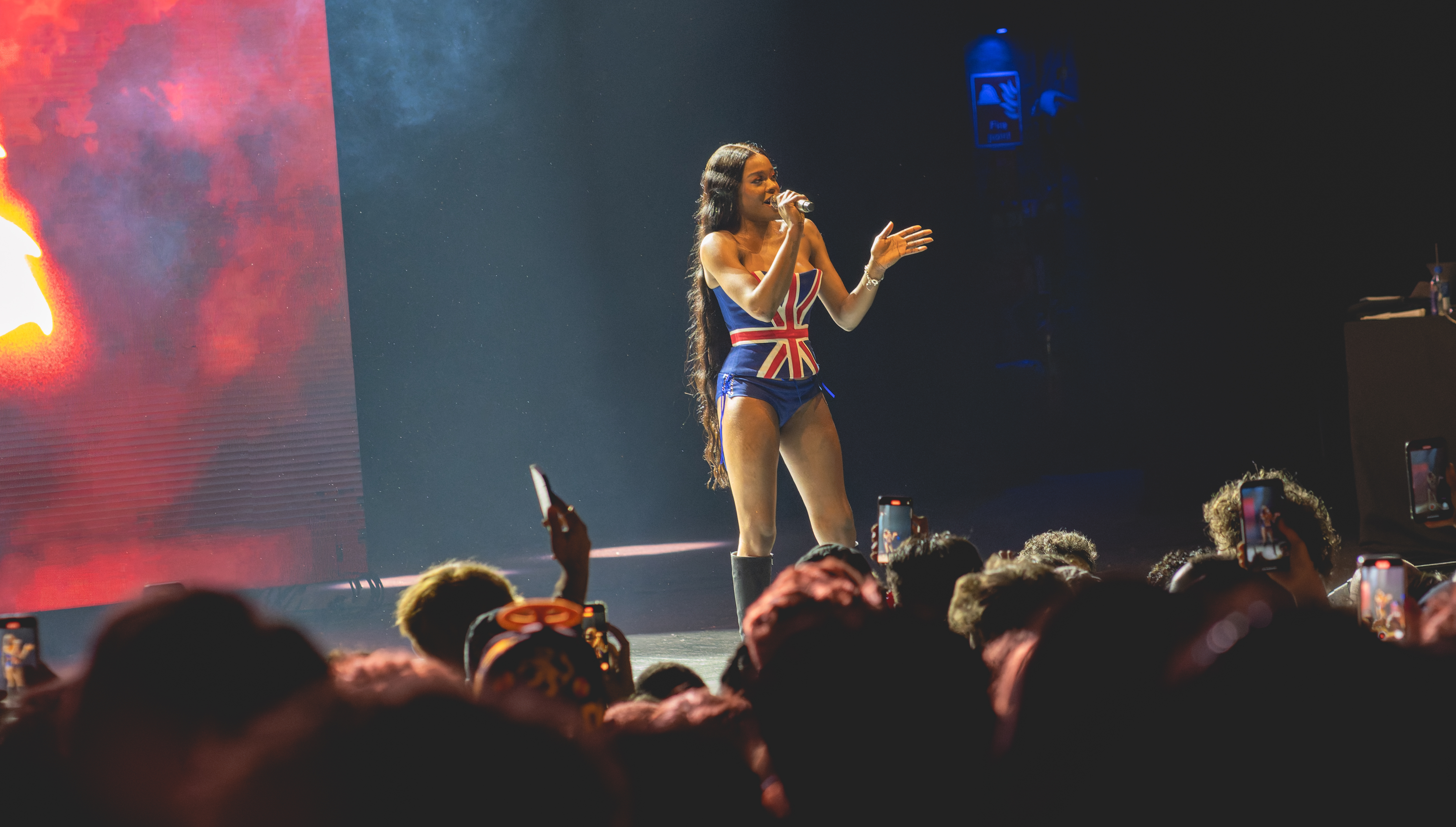
Azealia performing at the O2 Brixton Academy in 2024

Banks separated from eOne Music in 2019. Consequently, she announced in May of that year that she had been working on a project called Yung Rapunxel: Pt. II. The title references Banks's debut single off Broke with Expensive Taste, "Yung Rapunxel". It was released through SoundCloud on September 11, 2019, before later being taken down.

On December 16, 2019, Banks released the promotional singles "Count Contessa" and "Pyrex Princess" on various streaming platforms. "Pyrex Princess" is a song from Business & Pleasure, previously released on August 22, 2018, before being taken down. "Count Contessa" was previously published on SoundCloud in 2013. A music video for "Count Contessa", directed by Rony Alwin and shot in Bali, Indonesia, was previously released on December 8, 2015.

=== 2020–present: Singles and Zenzealia ===
Throughout the first quarter of 2020, Banks debuted her podcast Cheapy's Two Cents and released multiple promotional singles, including "Slow Hands", an Interpol cover previously uploaded in 2012, as well as "Salchichón" being produced by frequent collaborator Onyx. Additionally, Banks released multiple tracks exclusively on her SoundCloud, such as "Diamond Nova", which previously served as the B-side to her 2013 single "ATM Jam", featuring and produced by Pharrell, as well as the Spanglish single, "Nirvana".

On June 9, 2020, Banks released the lead single from her as-yet-unreleased album Business & Pleasure titled "Black Madonna" featuring producer Lex Luger. On December 23, 2020, she released the promotional single "Mamma Mia" on all platforms, where it was previously released on her SoundCloud account since April 2020. Banks released the single "Six Flags" featuring Slim Dollars on January 7, 2021.

On July 7, 2021, Banks released the single "Fuck Him All Night". A perfume of the same name was launched months later. She also announced that she was under new management.

Banks began teasing a track titled "New Bottega" in August 2022. On November 9, she announced that she had officially signed to Parlophone Records, under Warner Music Group. In January 2023, she posted an Instagram Story stating that she had left Parlophone and announced that she would instead release "New Bottega" independently. After several delays, "New Bottega" was released by the Australian dance music label Sweat It Out on March 10, 2023, as a collaboration between Australian house producer Torren Foot and Banks. In May 2023, Banks said she had not authorized the release and criticized Torren Foot's rework of the song, which she called "a piss poor remix of [her] master track". She also criticized Sweat It Out for marketing "New Bottega" as a dance recording instead of a hip-hop song. She released Zenzealia, a meditation album, on April 21, 2026.

== Artistry ==
"212"
The 2011 song features numerous vocal shifts, as well as lyrics containing word play, alliteration, and assonance.

Banks has said she admires American recording artists Beyoncé and Aaliyah, calling the former "the queen of everything. She's the most remarkable performer and musician. And this is just my humble opinion, but I just think she's better than everyone else making music right now." Banks is inspired by, and has drawn directly upon, black gay culture, such as the film Paris Is Burning, in her music.

AllMusic characterizes Banks as "a stylish vocalist who combines hardcore hip-hop, indie pop, and dance music". Meanwhile, The Guardian's John Robinson considered Banks's style "an appealing blend of Missy Elliott and dance-pop". In regards to her musical style, Banks has frequently been noted for the use of profanity in many of her songs, particularly her reclamation of the word "cunt", examples including her debut single "212", in which she uses the word more than ten times, or other songs such as "Fierce", in which she refers to herself as the "cunt queen". Banks attributes this to her upbringing in Harlem, saying, "...I'm from Harlem. I went to art school; I grew up with the cunts. And that term doesn't come from me! People think I invented it, but I didn't. To be cunty is to be feminine and to be, like, aware of yourself. Nobody's fucking with that inner strength and delicateness. The cunts, the gay men, adore that. My friends would say, 'Oh you need to cunt it up! You're being too banjee.' Banjee means unrefined and rough. You need your cunts: they fix your hair for you and do your makeup. They give you confidence and give you life." She is also known for her often fast-paced rapping, or "flow". In a review of Banks's debut EP 1991, Chris Dart of Exclaim! found Banks's rapping speed "remarkable", commenting that she "manages a feat that takes most rappers the better part of a career to master: the perfect marriage of bangin', club-friendly beats and smart, crisply delivered lyrics".

Since writing "212", Banks has adopted an alter ego, "Yung Rapunxel". This alter ego was adapted from Banks calling herself Rapunzel due to a long weave she wore while working at Starbucks as a teenager. Banks discussed this with Rolling Stone saying, "Yung Rapunxel is that girl who pisses people off but doesn't really mean to. She's actually a sweetheart! But people are so taken aback that she's so herself; she's not even trying to be unique or different. She literally just lives in her head; she does what she wants to do. So, the lipstick is here for someone who is happy to be themself."

== Personal life ==
Banks is bisexual. She has stated that she doesn't want to be a representative of the community or reduced to the token "lesbian rapper." In 2016, Banks shared that one of her siblings was a trans man and congratulated him on his top surgery.

In October 2019, Banks announced that she would perform under the name Azilka (Russian: Азилька) during her tour in post-Soviet countries.

In February 2021, Banks publicly announced her engagement to American artist Ryder Ripps, but the next month Banks announced the end of the relationship. They had made an audio sex tape and sold it as an NFT.

In November 2023, Banks posted an Instagram story in which she accused American record producer Diplo of sexually coercing her during the time they worked together when she was 17 years old. She said that he would pressure her to have sex with him in exchange for music and then refuse to give her the tracks. She also accused him of sexual misconduct towards other women, calling him "someone who needs to be canceled from the [music] industry".

=== Health ===
In July 2016, Banks admitted to lightening her skin due to skin blemishes caused by her birth control regimen and defended the process of skin bleaching. In December of the same year, she revealed that she had had a miscarriage and asked her fans for advice and support.

BuzzFeed News wrote Banks "has been frank about her own mental health issues". In 2020, during a plea deal in Manhattan Court to avoid prison time for assault, she was ordered to seek mental health treatment. The British magazine gal-dem reported the same year that she has bipolar disorder, but she stated in 2025 that it was a misdiagnosis and that she has premenstrual dysphoric disorder (PMDD) as well as post-traumatic stress disorder (PTSD) and attention deficit hyperactivity disorder (ADHD).

== Politics and controversy ==
=== Legal issues regarding music ===
==== Jeff Kwatinetz ====
After the release of her hit single 212, Banks signed with Interscope Records and Polydor Records in January 2012 which both are apart of Universal Music Group. It was around this time that Banks was expected to release her debut album, Broke With Expensive Taste however this never came to fruition due to creative differences between Banks and Universal Music Group. Ultimately, this led to Banks ending her contract with Universal Music Group in July of 2014 as she felt that they didn't understand the type of music she wanted to produce.

Following her exit from Universal Music Group, Banks began working with Jeff Kwatinetz who was the CEO of Prospect Park. Banks ended up surprise-releasing Broke With Expensive Taste on November 7th 2014 with no conventional rollout beforehand. Almost a year after the release of her debut album, Banks was released from Prospect Park in July 2015. Banks later claimed that she could not release new music as Prospect Park was holding onto her album contract until February 2016.

In June of 2020, Banks begins to claim she wasn't receiving the money she believes she was owed from Broke With Expensive Taste. She pleaded to fans and told them to not stream the album, claiming that Kwatinetz was taking the money from it.. In response to this, Kwatinetz sued Banks for defamation, harassment, civil extortion, invasion of privacy and alleged interference with his business relations. He also made allegations that Banks made threats involving him and his family, which Banks denied. In March 2021, Kwatinetz requests his lawsuit to be dismissed without prejudice and then in September of the same year, he filed a substantially similar lawsuit with more claims added onto the original allegations.

In November 2021, Banks countersues alleging breach of contract, fraud, breach of fiduciary duty and negligence. Her complaint alleged that Prospect Park didn't provide its first accounting statement until July 2020, more than five years after the album's release, and that the statement showed her receiving only about $15,345. She disputed Prospect Park's accounting of the album's revenues and expenses.

In 2023, Banks' lawyer withdrew from the case, and she subsequently got additional time to gather evidence. A judge postponed the trial that had been scheduled for February 2024 until at least July 2024. In 2025, the litigation increasingly moved in Kwatinetz's favour and court proceedings were addressing his claims including defamation, stalking and civil extortion, among others.And by January 2026, a court had determined Banks was liable on multiple claims, including stalking, defamation and civil extortion. That left the question of damages to be decided separately. In April 2026, Banks missed a court hearing ahead of a May 5th bench trial concerning how much she would have to pay Kwatinetz in damages. Rolling Stone reported that the liability finding had already happened; the remaining trial was about the financial consequences.

In July 2026, Banks made additional claims where she sought a temporary restraining order against Kwatinetz and made new allegations about their past relationship and alleged psychological abuse. Kwatinetz's lawyer rejected her account and said her claims against him had already been dismissed with prejudice. He also characterised the new filing as another attempt to harm Kwatinetz.

=== Beliefs and politics ===
Banks is known for publicly speaking out on African American civil rights issues. In December 2014, she called for over $100 trillion in reparations to be paid to African Americans, citing U.S. reparations to Native American communities and German reparations to Jewish survivors of the Holocaust as precedents. On Twitter, she urged young African Americans to take an interest in such issues, adding, "We are the children of the people who perished in the name of modern capitalism and we deserve a piece of that fucking pie". She suggested that reparations could improve educational prospects for Black Americans.

Banks has voiced support for African diaspora religions such as Palo Mayombe and Santería.

==== Donald Trump and political stances ====
Banks has shared shifting opinions on Donald Trump and his policies since 2015, when she expressed support for his hardline immigration stance, stated that the U.S. was "playing foster parent" for Mexico. Banks announced that she planned to vote for Trump in the 2016 election because he was "evil like America is evil," which some speculated was a publicity stunt, before later retracting the endorsement. Banks publicly congratulated Trump on the eventual election result.

In 2021, she moved from Los Angeles to Miami, citing disillusionment with the liberal politics of LA and adding that she felt "way safer" in Florida. She has praised Florida's governor Ron DeSantis for his perceived focus on practical issues.

In July 2024, Banks attended a rally in support of Trump's 2024 presidential campaign in Florida, despite having previously offered her support for Ron DeSantis and his campaign. The day before the election, Banks stated that she would be voting for Kamala Harris due to concerns over Trump's close ties to Elon Musk, who she said "belongs nowhere near American politics". However, on November 6, she claimed to have "lied" and voted for Trump—a decision she later regretted.

In July 2025, Banks defended Trump's appearance in the Epstein files, claiming that "[having sex with] 14-year-old girls was really only made a social taboo in the 1990s."

==== International politics ====
===== Relationship with Israel and denouncement of Palestine =====
Banks has offered shifting opinions on Israel and its relations internationally, at one point stating that canceling her performance in the country would be "totally anti-Semitic". Banks has stated that due to anti-black racism in the Arab world, she is a Zionist and supports Israel. She has criticized the two-state solution, stating that an Arab state would be unable to support itself and that Palestinians should become naturalized Israelis or leave. After performing in Tel Aviv in 2018, she said she would never visit again due to the racism she experienced in the country. However, she returned in 2025, opening her performance wearing an Israeli flag and a Star of David necklace.

In the lead up to her concert in Tel Aviv, Banks had condemned the Palestinian-led BDS Movement and labelled it antisemitic over Instagram. After the concert, Banks pushed back against claims of apartheid in Israel on Twitter, citing supposed diversity in her audience.

In the wake of the Gaza war and Gaza genocide, Banks appeared to double down on these sentiments on Twitter, declaring her support for Zionism, and claiming that "no black person should support Palestine", accusing Arabs of anti-Black racism. Banks also accused Palestinians in the Gaza Strip of carrying out genocide against Afro-Palestinians, a claim she made without providing evidence. In another post, Banks claimed Palestine was not a country, writing that Palestinian territory "should all be Israel".

Later that month, Banks announced on Twitter that she would be withdrawing from the lineup of two music festivals in the United Kingdom, Maiden Voyage and Boomtown. Banks had claimed that the two festivals were pressuring her into expressing pro-Palestinian views, which she described as extortion. After which, a representative from Boomtown refuted this in a comment to the Evening Standard, saying that the festival does not "dictate the personal views and beliefs of performers".

====== Antisemitism and anti-Zionism ======
In 2025, Banks shared a post on Twitter claiming that Jewish people had too much influence in the entertainment industry. In 2026, Banks took to X to declare her dissatisfaction with Israel's attacks on Iran during the 2026 Iran War. Banks stated in a series of posts that she hopes Israel's prime minister, Benjamin Netanyahu is dead. She also proceeded to say that "We should strike a big [deal] with Iran and just go to war with Israel and keep the petrodollar strong.

===== Ukraine =====
AZEALIA BANKS	Twitter
@iiwasinthee212

No. lol

Fuck you fuck islam fuck muslim fuck gays and fuck palestine.

You should apologize to me and the jews and the Israelis and nicki for making us hate you all like so.

Mar 27, 2026

FE	Twitter
@yearningbull

Can you like, apologize, like legit get on camera, no makeup, neutral clothing and backdrop, ring light on neutral warm, your hair up in a bun; just apologize and say that you’re truly sorry and start making music

Mar 27, 2026

During the Russian invasion in Ukraine, responding to reports of Black people fleeing Ukraine being denied exit, Banks blamed President Zelenskyy and criticized his appearance at the Grammys while Ukraine was "under attack." She accused Ukraine of recruiting soldiers from Africa and urged the nation to surrender to avoid nuclear war. In a previous statement, Banks referred to Putin as her "favorite super villain ever." In July 2025, Banks faced criticism for mocking the emaciated appearance of a recently-released Ukrainian prisoner of war.

=== Opinions on gender and sexuality ===
==== Transgender ====
While Banks has been publicly supportive of her brother's gender transition, she has also sharply criticized transgender medicine under the assumption that it redirects resources away from more critical care. In 2023, she argued that state funding for other healthcare issues should take precedence over funding for gender-affirming surgery, which she compared to cosmetic surgery.

In 2021, she said that trans women are "just gay boys on hormones using male aggression to force their ways into women's spaces," and compared gender-affirming surgery to castration.

In 2025, she criticized J. K. Rowling for her "paranoid" views on trans women. When asked about her own past comments, she denied being transphobic and said that she had been reacting to "activist" rhetoric at the time; she also argued that "a female and a woman are two different concepts". She also mentioned her sibling is a trans man and noted the "pain" and "ostracism" that is caused by transphobia.

==== Homosexuals ====
Banks is controversial within the LGBTQ+ community, despite her own bisexual identity, with Out describing her as a "bully."

Banks has repeatedly used the epithet "faggot," wielding the term against Perez Hilton, producer Baauer, and Zayn Malik. In September 2015, a video surfaced showing Banks using the slur again against a Delta flight attendant. In response to backlash from the video, Banks likened the LGBT community to the Ku Klux Klan. She went on to call the community "weak" and "easily moved" and lamented being part of the same community as those she criticized. In 2016, Banks apologized for using the word and said she would not do it again.

In 2020, she said gay men were "appropriating horse culture" by using harnesses, ketamine, and sexual lubricant.

In July 2025 Banks sparked criticism for stating that being gay or transgender is unnatural, claiming they stemmed from trauma responses.

However, in June 2026, Banks took to twitter to wish the LGBTQ+ community a happy Pride Month.

=== Public feuds and disputes ===
Billboard has described Banks as being more well known for her "feuds on and off social media with her fellow musicians" than her music. Some of Banks' more notable disputes with celebrities include:

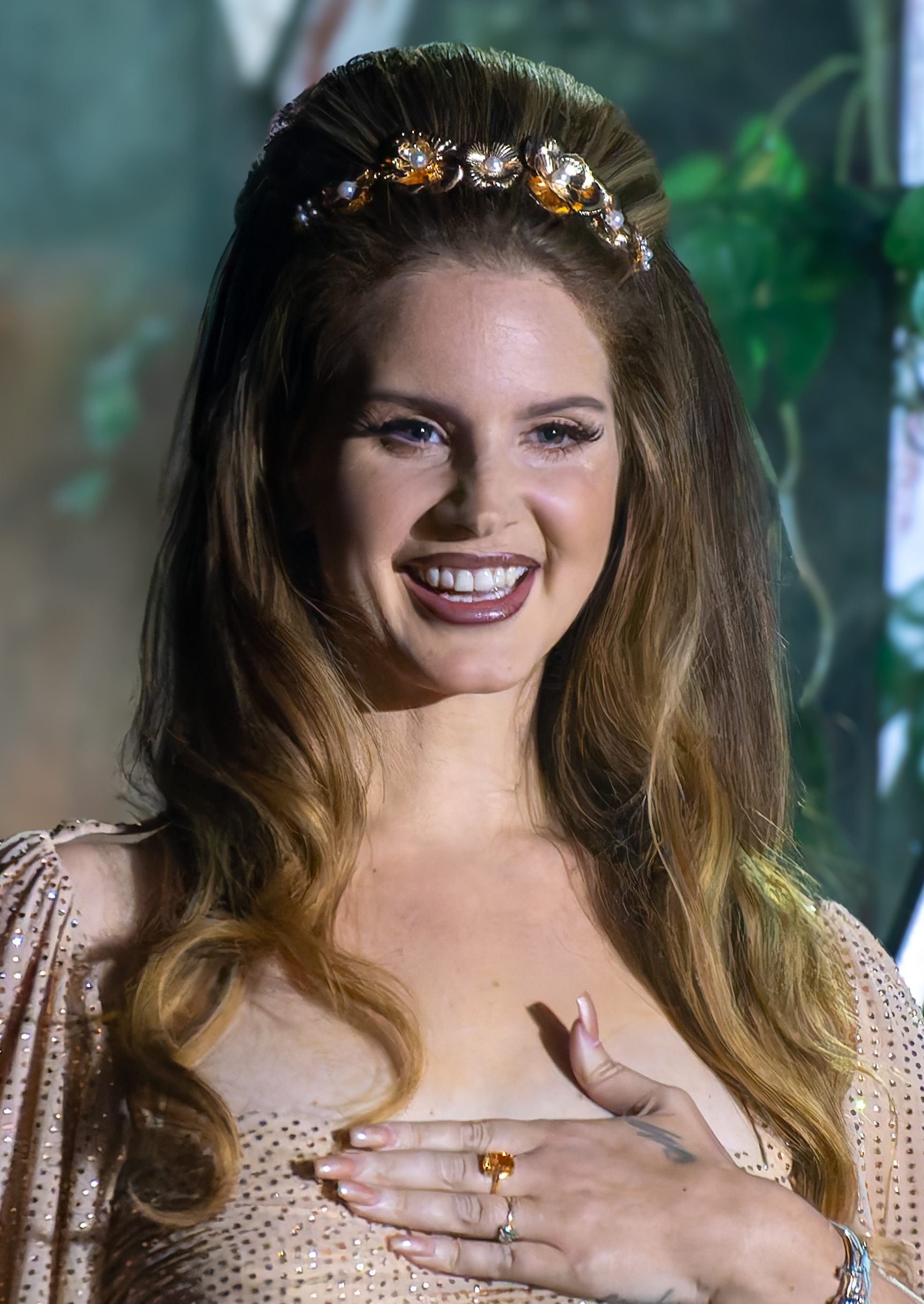
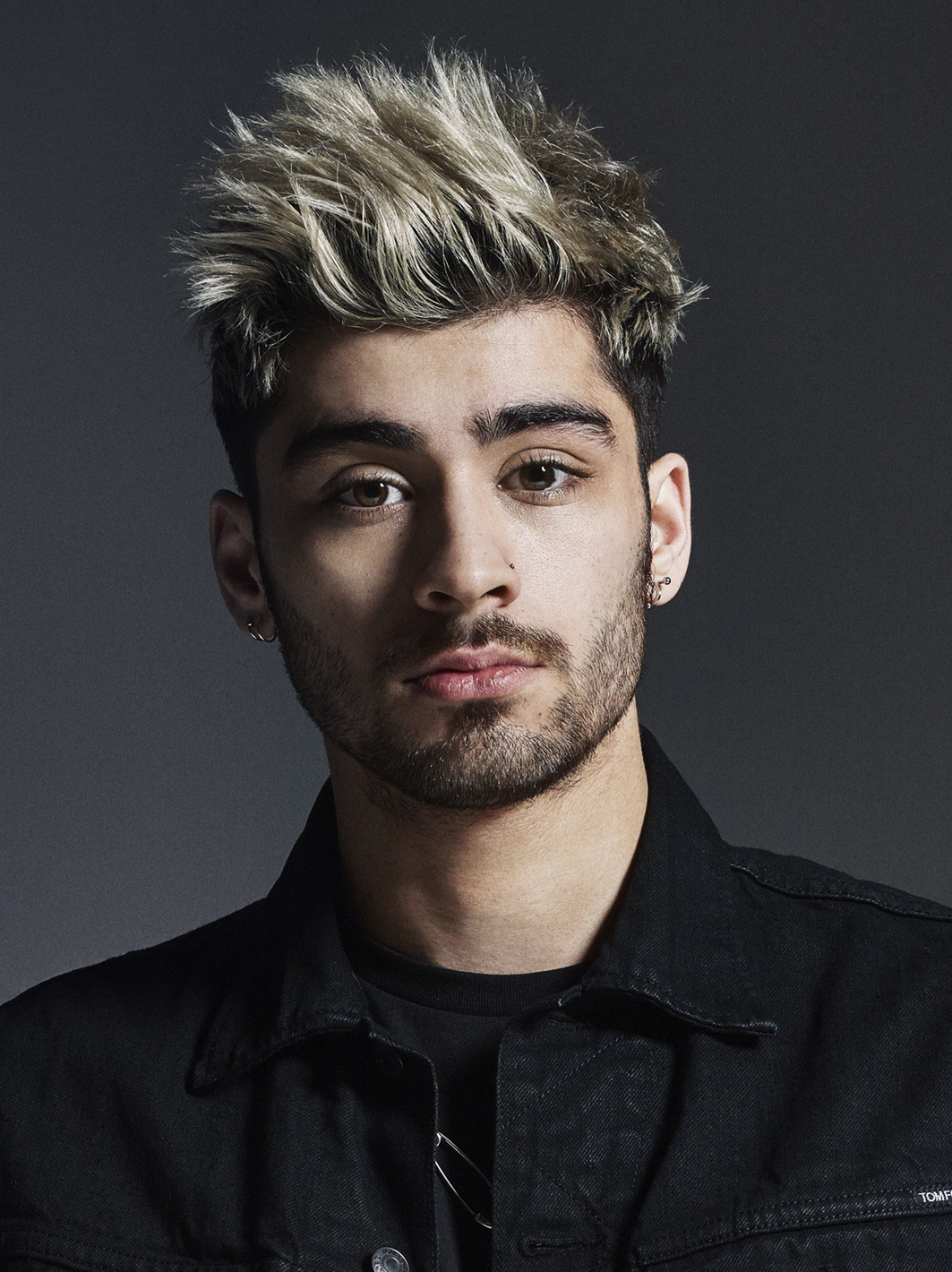
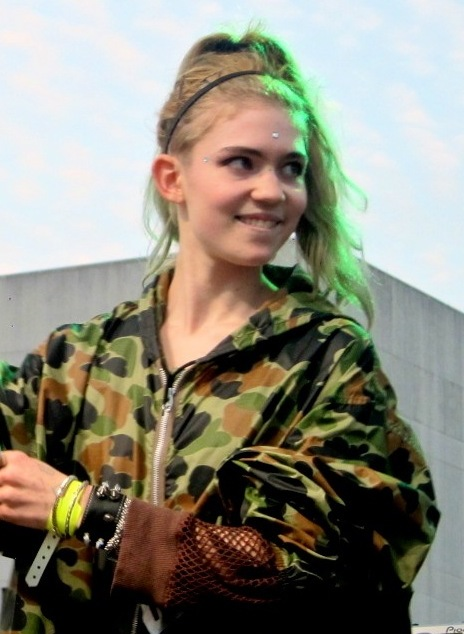
Some of Banks' most notable social media disputes have been with singers Lana Del Rey, Zayn Malik, and Grimes.

==== Sarah Palin ====
In April 2016, Banks tweeted that politician Sarah Palin should be sexually assaulted, ostensibly as a result of a satirical article claiming Palin was pro-slavery. Palin condemned these comments and stated that she planned on taking legal action against Banks. Banks then posted an apology to Palin on Tumblr in which she claimed not to call for Palin's assault.

==== Beyoncé ====
In April 2016, following the release of Beyoncé's studio album Lemonade, Banks took to Twitter to criticize the project, calling it "the antithesis of what feminism is" and accusing Beyoncé of perpetuating "that sad black female sufferance." She also labeled Beyoncé a "thief" and a "poacher," alleging that she appropriated art from other Black women.

In June 2022, Banks commented on social media that mashups combining her music with Beyoncé's then-new single "Break My Soul" were "horrible," asking fans to stop creating them.

The following year, Banks stated in an Instagram comment that had Beyoncé sampled her music on Renaissance without permission, she would have pursued legal action against Beyoncé, her label, and associated parties.

In March 2024, Banks released an audio recording criticizing Beyoncé's country-oriented album Cowboy Carter, accusing her of pandering to white audiences and Grammy Award voters, kowtowing to Taylor Swift, and no longer setting trends in the music industry. She also claimed that Black country artists without Beyoncé's resources had been working the genre for years without equivalent recognition.

In the same commentary, Banks expressed that she would have welcomed a collaboration between Beyoncé and Scottish singer-songwriter KT Tunstall, a remark that led to a friendly exchange between Banks and Tunstall on social media.

==== Zayn Malik ====
On May 11, 2016, Banks posted a series of racist Tweets about British singer Zayn Malik, claiming Malik had taken inspiration from her artistry and calling him "curry scented" in addition to homophobic and racial slurs. On the same day, Banks apologized over Twitter "to anyone who was offended," but clarified that she was not apologizing for making these remarks. As a result of her remarks, she was dropped from the headliner at the Born and Bred Festival and suspended from Twitter.

However, later in October 2016, Banks made a full apology to Malik over Instagram, saying that she had misconstrued Malik's original post, and called the language that she had used "derogatory."

==== Russell Crowe ====
In October 2016, Banks filed a police report against actor Russell Crowe, claiming that he choked and spat at her before proceeding to call her a "nigger" during a party in his hotel suite. Crowe in turn claimed that he removed Banks from the premises because she threatened to physically assault other attendees. The Los Angeles District Attorney's office dropped the case in December.

==== Grimes and Elon Musk ====
In 2018, Banks and Grimes announced that they would be releasing music together. Grimes purportedly invited Banks to a her and Elon Musk's Los Angeles home to finish the collaboration. Banks claimed that Grimes had left her alone in the house with Musk "for days," likening the experience to the plot of Get Out. During Banks' stay at Musk's residence, Musk posted on Twitter that he was "considering taking Tesla private at $420" while allegedly under the influence of LSD.During her stay, Banks took to Twitter to claim that Musk had benefitted from apartheid. The SEC sued Musk for misleading investors, claiming that Musk did not have the funding he claimed to have. Both Banks and Grimes were subpoenaed and demanded to preserve evidence related to the trial.

In 2019, Banks posted screenshots of text messages between her and Grimes from over the course of a year, showing Grimes commenting on Banks' weight, Banks making remarks about Grimes' appearance, and Banks claiming that Grimes smelled "like a roll of nickels". In late 2024, Banks replied to a post Grimes made on Twitter insinuating that Musk had left her, which Grimes denied. Grimes then complimented Banks, and later clarified in another post that the metallic scent Banks complained of was caused by shell casings.

In February 2025, Banks criticized an interview Grimes gave with Time, telling her to return to Canada, in addition to making comments about her appearance.

==== Cardi B ====
In September 2016, Banks referred to Cardi B as a "Poor mans Nicki Minaj". In response to this, Cardi B posted a video of Banks dancing to her song Bodak Yellow. On May 11 2018, during an interview at The Breakfast Club Banks heavily criticised Cardi B, including calling her an "illiterate, untalented rat" and describing her as a "caricature of a black woman". Cardi responded the next day in a lengthy Instagram post in which she answered Banks directly and called her approach to advocating for women contradictory. Cardi then proceeded to delete her Instagram and private her X (then Twitter) page which highly publicised the feud.

==== Lana Del Rey ====
In September 2018, Lana Del Rey criticized Kanye West for supporting Donald Trump, saying that Trump's presidency was a "loss for the country", and that West's comments were a "loss for the culture". Banks accused Del Rey of performative activism, bringing up Del Rey's past collaboration with ASAP Rocky, whom Banks accused of assaulting female fans. The pair exchanged insults, leading up to Banks threatening to sue Del Rey.

==== Lil Nas X ====
In April 2024, Banks posted a message to Instagram suggesting that Lil Nas X and Tyler, the Creator should pursue a romantic relationship, arguing it would be more culturally significant than either artist dating white partners. Tyler commented on the post with apparent amusement, while Nas welcomed the idea on social media.

In October 2024, Banks posted on X that Nas had "fell off so hard" and had "NO BARS," to which Nas responded by dismissing her commercial relevance while simultaneously expressing appreciation for her music. He later shared a screenshot of himself listening to her music on his Instagram story, writing that he wished her well and encouraged her to pursue her artistry. Banks continued her criticism the following day, stating he is "a terrible lyricist with pedestrian musical sensibilities." Nas did not respond further.

==== Charli XCX ====
In late 2024, Banks shared a post on Twitter criticizing the appearance of singer Charli XCX, and in response, The 1975 frontman Matty Healy criticized Banks and accused her of jealousy. Banks then went on to further criticize the looks of both Healy and his fiancée Gabbriette. In response, Healy shared a post appearing to threaten to attack Banks, which he later deleted and apologized for. Nonetheless, Banks in another post alluded to taking legal action against Healy. A legal representative for Banks then sent a cease-and-desist letter to Healy, which Banks posted to Twitter, but was later removed.

==== Conor McGregor ====
In July 2025, Banks posted screenshots on Twitter of multiple nude photos that Conor McGregor appeared to have sent Banks, one of which was sent with the caption "Don't be a rat cos all rats get caught", which Banks interpreted as a threat. Banks then alluded to McGregor's bid for the Irish presidency, before posting another screenshot where it appeared Banks no longer had access to the photos.

==== J. K. Rowling ====
Banks shared a post on Twitter in 2025 suggesting that J. K. Rowling's husband left her for a transgender woman, which is why Rowling holds certain views on transgender topics. Rowling then mentioned that she was abused by her first husband in a post responding to Banks, which Banks said she had not seen because she had blocked Rowling.

=== Witchcraft ===
In December 2016, Banks posted a series of videos on Instagram detailing her cleanup of a closet in her apartment where she claimed to have been practicing witchcraft. She admitted to practicing "three years worth of brujeria". The video appeared to show dried blood, feathers, and the carrion of dead chickens. In January 2021, she received criticism after posting a video on Instagram of her exhuming the remains of her dead pet cat, Lucifer, and collecting some of his bones. She later said in an interview that she did not eat the cat and exhumed it for taxidermizing purposes.

=== Criticisms of other countries ===
==== Ireland ====
In early 2019, Banks shared a post on Instagram criticizing Aer Lingus, claiming the airline had banned her. Banks also went on to call Irish women "ugly", additionally likening them to Oompa-Loompas in another Instagram story, before calling herself the "queen of Ireland".

Later that week, Banks posted multiple comments on Instagram calling Irish people "inbred", as well as appearing to make light of the Great Famine. Responding to these comments, a barrister suggested that these could breach the United Kingdom's Communications Act 2003, and that Banks could be subject to legal action upon landing in the country, where she was slated to perform next. Banks then replied accusing the barrister of racism.

Banks once again criticized Aer Lingus in 2025 on Twitter, reiterating her comments on the appearances of the airline's staff, this time likening them to characters from James and the Giant Peach and claiming that the airline "needs help".

==== Sweden ====
In 2019, Banks accused the staff of SAS of profiling her on a flight leaving from Stockholm over Instagram, leading to Banks deeming Swedish people as racist. Soon after this incident, Banks then shared another post calling for Sweden to be bombed.

In 2025, Banks announced that she was moving to Stockholm to collaborate with Swedish DJ Kornél Kovács. However, after moving Banks then criticized the city's social scene and nightlife over multiple tweets.

==== Australia ====
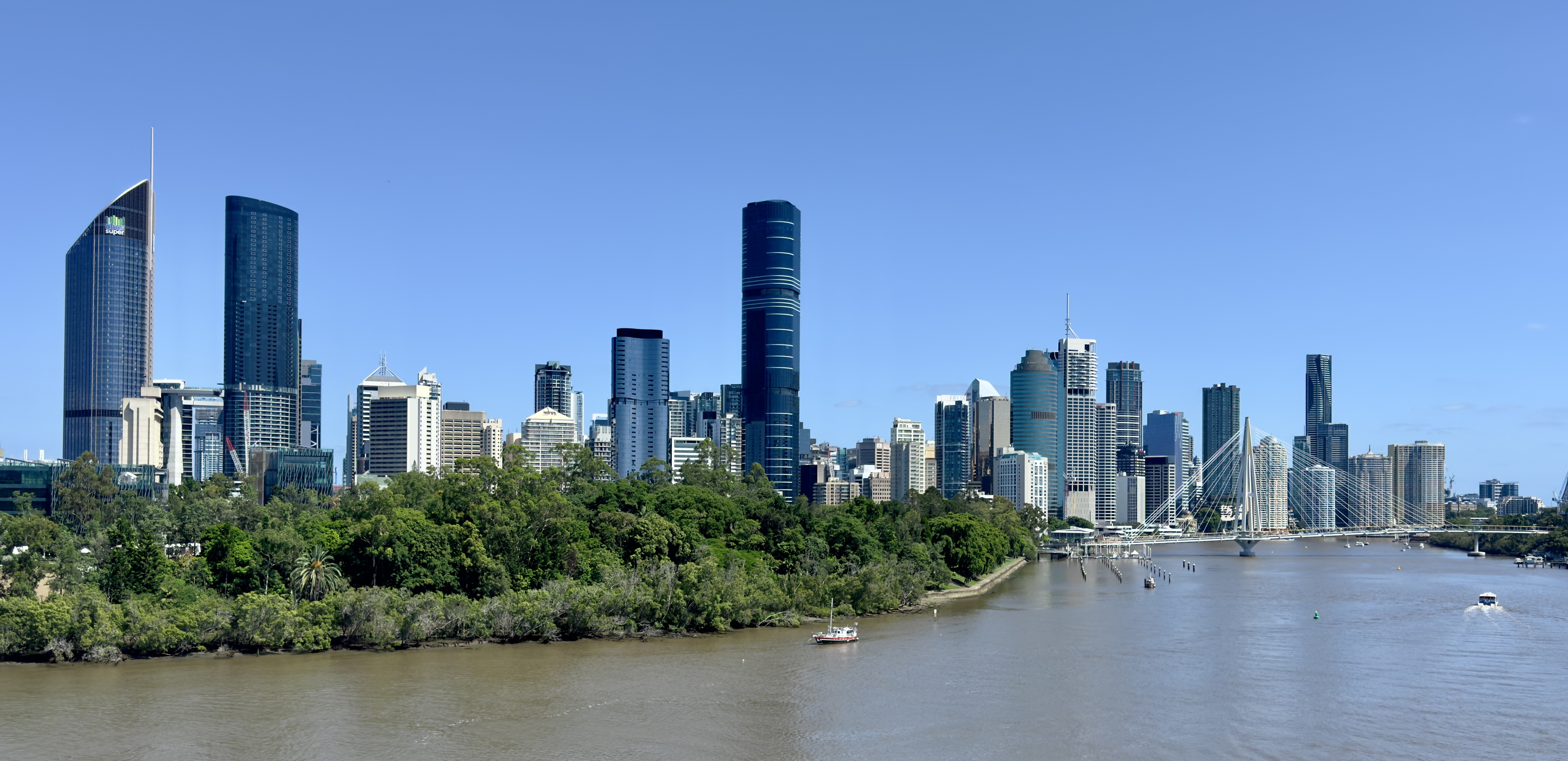
Banks canceled her show in Brisbane hours before her concert was set to begin.

In 2022, Banks cancelled a show in Brisbane hours before she was set to perform because of a previous incident where a bottle was thrown at her on stage in Brisbane. Banks announced that she would not tour Australia again, stating that the racism she had experienced in the country made her "utterly miserable".

In 2023, the track "New Bottega" was released by Australian producer Torren Foot featuring Banks, who criticized the version of the song that was released on Instagram, comparing it to the track's original mix. After this, Banks went on to criticize Australia's music industry, calling the country "unimportant" and its culture "trash".

=== Reactions ===
Over the years, Banks has gained publicity for her public conflicts. However, her actions on social media have drawn criticism from organizations such as PETA, GLAAD, and the National Black Justice Coalition, the latter of which publicly called for Banks to be banned from Instagram. In addition to having been banned from social media platforms multiple times, Banks has had performances canceled as a result of statements made online.

Banks has faced social media bans and concert cancellations over her online conduct, which some say has eclipsed her musical career.

In 2016, Banks was briefly suspended from Twitter for "racially-charged" tweets toward Zayn Malik. Banks faced suspensions again in 2018 and 2020 as a result of a dispute with Monét X Change and remarks about transgender healthcare, respectively. Banks rejoined Twitter after Elon Musk acquired the app.

Banks was suspended from Instagram in October 2022, but soon rejoined under a different account.

After having her performance at a music festival canceled in 2016 over her remarks about Zayn Malik, Banks was then removed from the lineup of the Milkshake Festival in 2025 due to backlash over Banks' opinions on the LGBTQ community. When Swedish singer Loreen was added to the lineup after Banks' cancelation, Banks then insulted her and accused her of being anti-Semitic.

Banks has also sparked, and contributed to, discussions about cancel culture, given that Banks is seen to have retained some level of notability despite potentially problematic behavior, and Banks herself said to Rolling Stone that she does not think she has been "canceled". However, Them has said that Banks may be more prone to cancelation because of her status as a queer Black woman.

Banks has been defended to various degrees by multiple outlets, with Crack labelling her "misunderstood", and Dazed pointing to her struggles with bipolar disorder, with both publications tying in the struggles many Black artists face in the music industry. In June 2025, she won a Sinai Award from online magazine Tablet for being one of the "12 people who made the world freer" that year, as the "original uncancellable rapper".

== Discography ==
Studio albums

- Broke with Expensive Taste (2014)
- Zenzealia (2026)

== Filmography ==
Azealia Banks film roles
Year	Title	Role	Notes
2005	The American Ruling Class	Empire Falls Singer and Dancer	Feature film
2017	Love Beats Rhymes	Coco	Feature film
2020	The Azealia Banks Cooking Show	Herself	Short film

== Tours ==
Headlining

- Mermaid Ball (2012–13)
- Broke with Expensive Taste Tour (2014–15)
- Azealia Banks: North American Tour (2017)
- Back to the Union Jack (2024)

Featured act

- ShockWaves NME Awards Tour (2012)

== Awards and nominations ==
Year	Award	Category	Work	Result
2011	BBC	Sound of 2012	Herself	Third
2011	Rober Awards Music Poll	Most Promising New Artist	Herself	Won
2011	Rober Awards Music Poll	Best Dance Anthem	"212"	Won
2012	NME Awards	Dancefloor Anthem	"212"	Nominated
2012	NME Awards	Philip Hall Radar Award	Herself	Won
2012	mtvU Woodie Awards	The Breaking Woodie	Herself	Nominated
2012	O Music Awards	Best Web-Born Artist	Herself	Nominated
2012	Urban Music Awards	Best Single	"212"	Won
2012	Urban Music Awards	Best International Artist	Herself	Nominated
2012	Urban Music Awards	Artist of the Year	Herself	Nominated
2012	European Festival Awards	Newcomer of the Year	Herself	Nominated
2012	UK Festival Awards	Best Breakthrough Act	Herself	Nominated
2012	UK Festival Awards	Anthem of the Summer	"212"	Nominated
2012	MOBO Awards	Best International Act	Herself	Nominated
2013	NME Awards	Villain of the Year	Herself	Nominated
2013	UK Music Video Awards	Best Urban Video – Budget	"Atlantis"	Nominated
2013	BET Awards	Best Female Hip Hop Artist	Herself	Nominated
2013	BET Awards	Best New Artist	Herself	Nominated
2013	International Dance Music Awards	Best Rap/Hip-Hop Dance Track	"212"	Nominated
2014	Billboard.com Mid-Year Music Awards	Most Memorable Feud	Herself vs T.I.	Nominated
2014	Rober Awards Music Poll	Best R&B	Herself	Nominated
2015	BET Awards	Best Female Hip Hop Artist	Herself	Nominated
2015	International Dance Music Awards	Best Rap/Hip-Hop/Trap Dance Track	"Heavy Metal and Reflective"	Nominated
2015	A2IM Libera Awards	Groundbreaking Album of the Year	Broke with Expensive Taste	Nominated
2015	Rober Awards Music Poll	Floorfiller of the Year	"Trap Queen" (with Fetty Wap) (Remix with Quavo & Gucci Mane)	Nominated
2016	Music Society Awards	Hip-Hop Recording of the Year	"Ice Princess"	Nominated
2016	Music Society Awards	Hip-Hop Album of the Year	Broke with Expensive Taste	Nominated
2017	Music Society Awards	Hip-Hop Album of the Year	Slay-Z	Nominated
2017	Music Society Awards	Best Urban Album	Slay-Z	Nominated
2017	Music Society Awards	Best Hip-Hop Recording of the Year	"The Big Big Beat"	Nominated
2017	Music Society Awards	Artist of the Year, Female - Hip-Hop	Herself	Nominated
