= Lemurian (album) =

Studio album by Lone
- Released: August 4, 2008
- Genre: Electronic, hip hop, ambient
- Label: Dealmaker

Lone chronology
Everything is Changing Colour (2007)	Lemurian (2008)	Ecstasy and Friends (2009)

Lemurian is the second full-length album by Nottingham based artist Lone, released on August 4, 2008. The album has been described as "shimmering, sun-drenched, and hazy" by a reviewer. When asked about the album's "summery" feel, Lone said "I knew I wanted to make music that sounded kind of warped, but it wasn't until I'd made loads of tracks that it started taking shape, and getting this summery feel. I didn't really set out for it to be a summery sounding record." Lone has been quoted as saying that one of the hardest things about making the album, for him, was choosing the track listing.

== Track listing ==
1. "Koran Angel" – 1:02
2. "Cali Drought" – 3:17
3. "Interview At Honolulu" – 3:51
4. "Banyan Drive" – 2:37
5. "Green Sea Pageant" – 1:08
6. "Girl" – 3:13
7. "Orange Tree" – 0:49
8. "Maya Codex" – 2:04
9. "Atoll Mirrored" – 1:15
10. "Sea Spray" – 3:52
11. "Under Two Palms" – 1:32
12. "Lens Flare Lagoon" – 3:10
13. "Borea" – 3:30
14. "Buried Coral Banks" – 0:54
15. "Phthalo Blue" – 3:36
16. "Sunken" – 2:01
17. "Minor Suns" - 2:48
