= List of songs recorded by Azealia Banks =

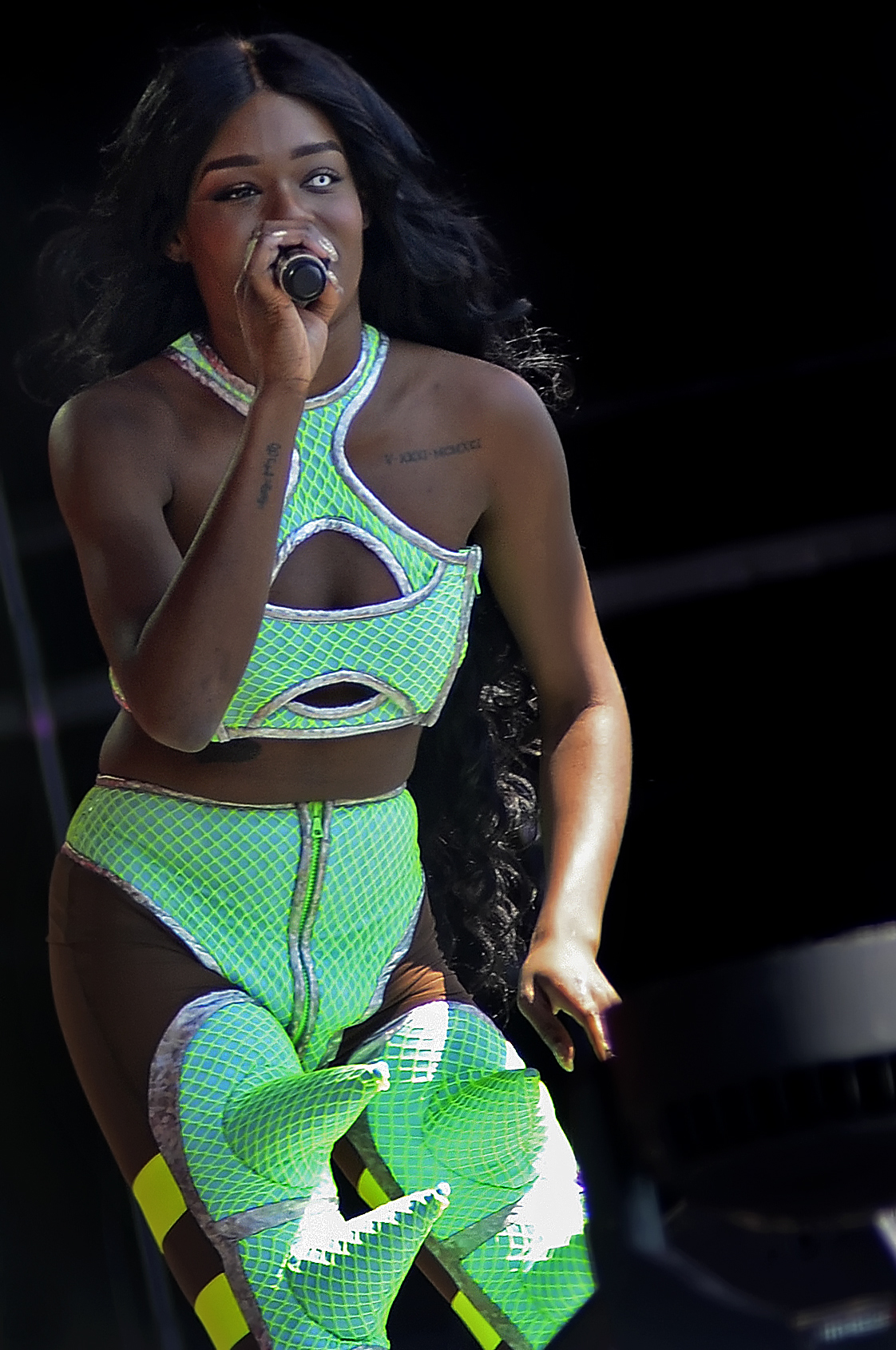
Azealia Banks performing at Glastonbury Festival 2013

American rapper Azealia Banks has recorded songs for two studio albums, one extended play (EP) and two mixtapes, as well as various other releases and guest appearances. Between 2009 and 2011, Banks uploaded several demo tracks on to the internet, including "Barbie Shit", "P-U-S-S-Y" and "Seventeen". These tracks caught the attention of XL Recordings, who subsequently signed a developmental record deal with Banks. In 2011, Banks self-released "212" as the lead single from her debut EP, 1991. "212" was a commercial success, peaking within the Top 40 of the regional charts in Ireland, Scotland, and the United Kingdom, later being certified platinum by the latter. The EP also spawned the single "Liquorice", which failed to mirror the success of its predecessor. In July 2012, Banks released a free nineteen-track mixtape titled Fantasea, which included collaborations with Shystie and Styles P. The mixtape received positive reviews from critics, with The Guardian commenting that it "showcase[s] an artist brimming with ideas".

Throughout 2013, Banks released various stand-alone tracks, including diss tracks to Angel Haze and Jim Jones, a collaboration with Paul Oakenfold titled "Venus", and a promotional single with Pharrell titled "ATM Jam". In November 2014, after numerous delays, Banks' debut studio album, Broke with Expensive Taste, was released. The album spawned four singles, "Yung Rapunxel", "Heavy Metal and Reflective", "Chasing Time" and "Ice Princess". The singles had limited commercial impact compared to that of "212", with none of them managing to break into any mainstream charts. To promote her album, a music video for the track "Wallace" was released, to widespread acclaim from critics. Banks' overall sound has been described as a mix of hardcore hip hop and indie pop, while her individual releases have been seen as house rap, witch hop, and dance pop records, respectively.

== Songs ==
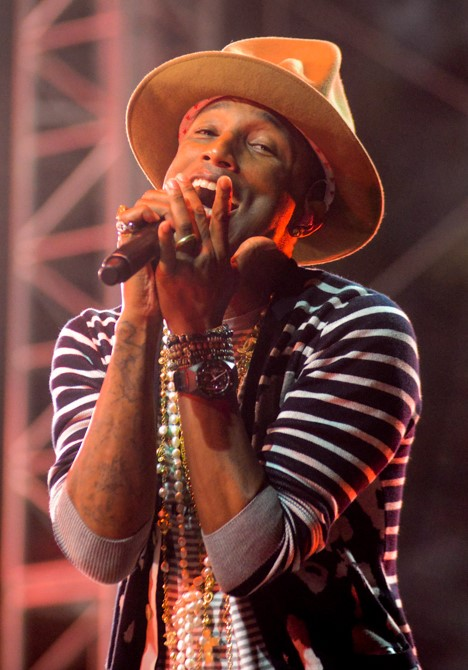
Pharrell Williams co-wrote "ATM Jam".

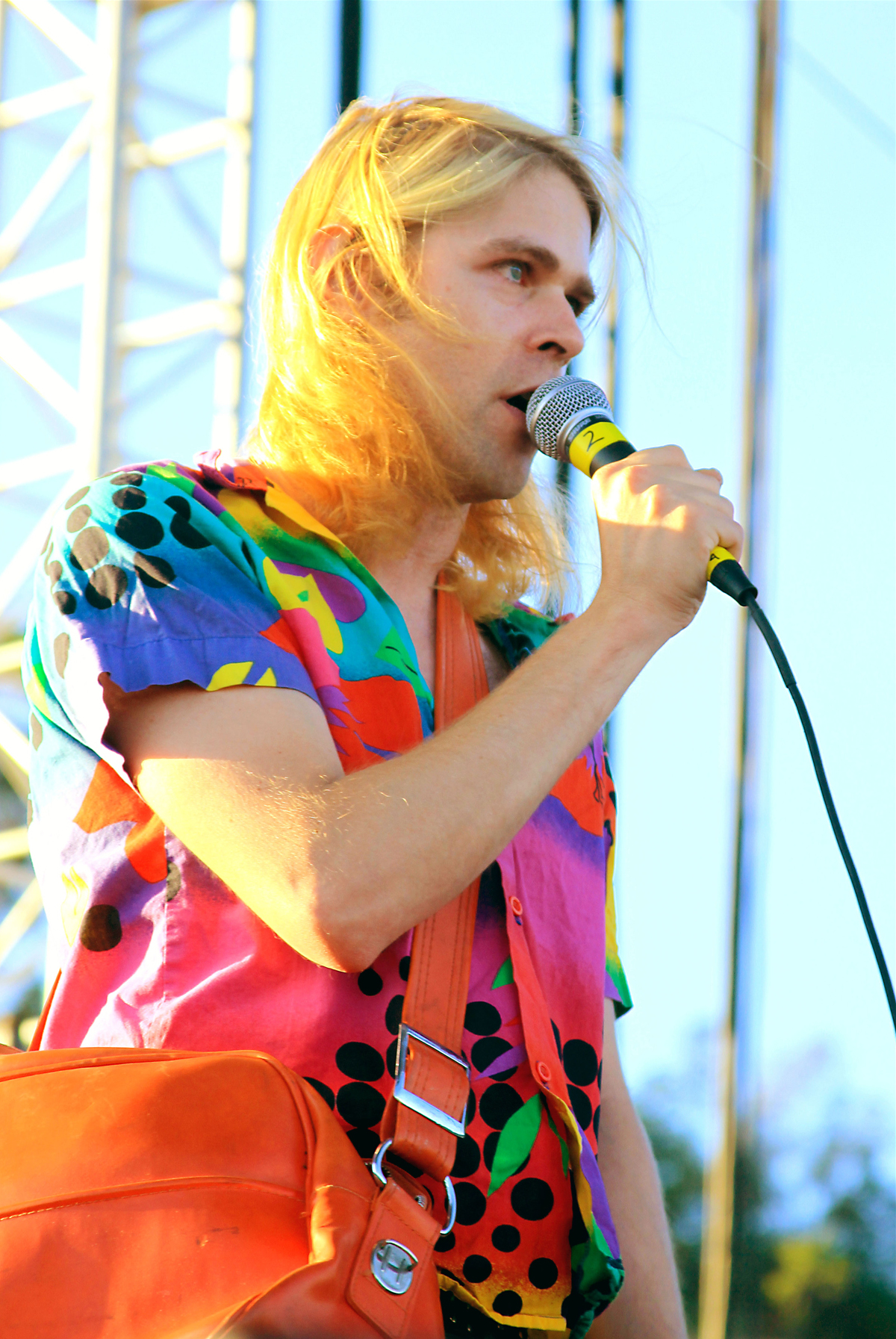
Ariel Pink co-wrote "Nude Beach A-Go-Go".

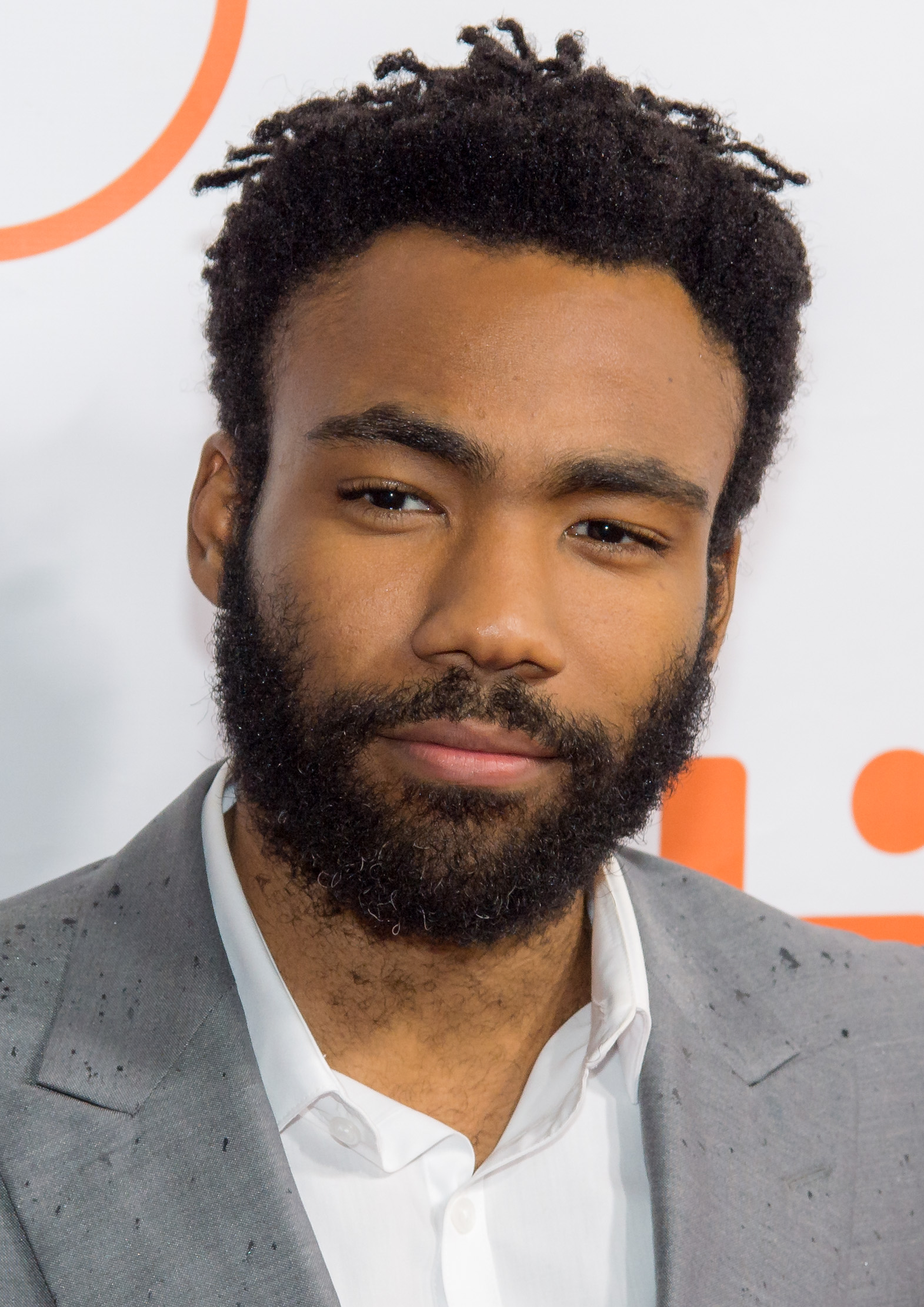
Banks is featured on "II. Earth: The Oldest Computer (The Last Night)" by Childish Gambino.

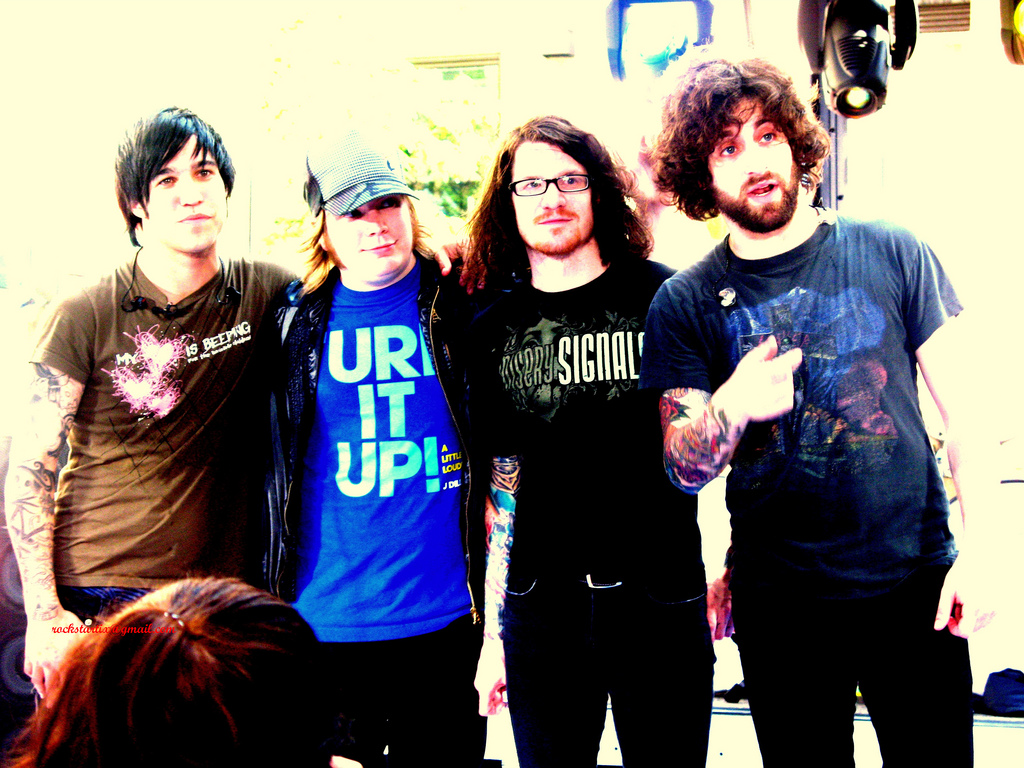
Banks is featured on a remix of Fall Out Boy's "The Kids Aren't Alright".

Key
†	Indicates single release
‡	Indicates unofficial remix
Non-album single	Indicates a song was released as a single, but did not appear on any album
Online exclusive	Indicates a song was uploaded to the internet for free streaming / downloads, and did not appear on any album

Songs recorded by Azealia Banks
Title	Artist(s)	Writer(s)	Album(s)	Year	Ref(s).
"1-800-Nu-Checks"	Azealia Banks	Unknown	Unknown	2020	
"1991"	Azealia Banks	Azealia Banks; Kevin James; Travis Stewart	1991	2012	
"212" †	Azealia Banks featuring Lazy Jay	Azealia Banks; Jef Martens	1991; Broke with Expensive Taste	2011	
"Along The Coast"	Azealia Banks	Azealia Banks; Jack Fuller; Kaytranada	Slay-Z	2016	
"Anna Wintour" †	Azealia Banks	Azealia Banks; Eugenio Sanchez; Dorian Strickland; Kevin JamesShug	Fantasea II: The Second Wave	2018	
"Aquababe"	Azealia Banks	Unknown	Fantasea	2012	
"Atlantis"	Azealia Banks	Unknown	Fantasea	2012	
"ATM Jam" †	Azealia Banks featuring Pharrell	Azealia Banks; Johnny Harris; Pharrell Williams	Non-album single	2013	
"Azealia Skit"	Azealia Banks	Unknown	Fantasea	2012	
"Bad Girls" (Danja N.A.R.S. Remix)	M.I.A. featuring Missy Elliott and Azealia Banks	Marcella Araica; Maya Arulpragasam; Azealia Banks; Melissa Elliott; Nate Hills	Bad Girls – Remixes	2012	
"Bambi"	Azealia Banks	Unknown	Online exclusive	2012	
"Barbie Shit"	Azealia Banks	Unknown	Online exclusive	2009	
"Barely Legal"	Azealia Banks	Julian Casablancas	Online exclusive	2013	
"BBD" †	Azealia Banks	Azealia Banks; Jonathan Harris; Kevin James	Broke with Expensive Taste	2014	
"Big Talk"	Azealia Banks featuring Rick Ross	Azealia Banks; Rick Ross; Vyle; DJ Yamez	Slay-Z	2016	
"Black Madonna" †	Azealia Banks featuring Lex Luger	Azealia Banks; Lex Luger	Business & Pleasure	2020	
"Blown Away" †	GypJaQ (Note: GypJaQ originally released "Blown Away" under the stage name Akhet.) featuring Azealia Banks	Unknown	Non-album single	2015	
"Blue Jeans" (Smims & Belle Remix)	Lana Del Rey featuring Azealia Banks	Azealia Banks; Elizabeth Grant; Emile Haynie; Dan Heath	Blue Jeans – Remixes	2012	
"Canada Goose"	Azealia Banks	Unknown	Unknown	2020	
"Can't Do it Like Me"	Azealia Banks	Azealia Banks; Jonathan Harris; Benga; Coki	Slay-Z	2016	
"Can't Stop Now" (K.L.A.M. Remix)	Major Lazer featuring Azealia Banks	Unknown	Lazers Never Die	2010	
"Chasing Time" †	Azealia Banks	Azealia Banks; Ronnie Colson; Warren "Oak" Felder; Jonathan Harris; Steve Mostyn; Kelly Sheehan; Andrew "Pop" Wansel	Broke with Expensive Taste	2014	
"The Chill$"	Azealia Banks	Unknown	Online exclusive	2009	
"Chips"	Azealia Banks	Unknown	Fantasea	2012	
"Chi Chi" †	Azealia Banks	Azealia Banks; Jonathan Harris	non-album single	2017	
"Competition" (Note: "Competition" is an early demo of her song "Luxury" that Banks leaked online in 2019.)	Azealia Banks	Unknown	Online exclusive	2010	
"Control It" †	Shystie featuring Azealia Banks	Azealia Banks; Chanelle Scott Calica	Gold Dust: Vol. 2	2012	
"Count Contessa"	Azealia Banks and Lone	Azealia Banks	Fantasea II: The Second Wave	2013	
"Crown"	Azealia Banks and Lunice	Azealia Banks	Slay-Z	2017	
"Dark Red Lipstick"	LoLa Monroe featuring Azealia Banks	Unknown	Lipstick and Pistols	2013	
"Desperado"	Azealia Banks	Azealia Banks; M. J. Cole; Kevin James; Harvey Mason, Jr.	Broke with Expensive Taste	2014	
"Diamond Nova"	Azealia Banks featuring Pharrell	Unknown	Online exclusive	2020	
"Discovery Channel"	Rocky Business featuring Azealia Banks & Isaiah Gripper	Unknown	July's Joy	2013	
"Escapades"	Azealia Banks	Azealia Banks	Fantasea II: The Second Wave	2017	
"Esta Noche"	Azealia Banks	Unknown	Fantasea	2012	
"Fantasea"	Azealia Banks	Unknown	Fantasea	2012	
"Fierce"	Azealia Banks	Unknown	Fantasea	2012	
"Fuck Up the Fun"	Azealia Banks	Unknown	Fantasea	2012	
"Gimme a Chance"	Azealia Banks	Azealia Banks; Oskar Cartaya; Enon; Kevin James; Harvey Mason, Jr.	Broke with Expensive Taste	2014	
"Gimme a Chance" (Note: "Gimme a Chance" was one of Banks' earliest releases as an artist. It was rewritten for her debut album in 2014.)	Azealia Banks	Unknown	Online exclusive	2009	
"Grand Scam (Lyrical Exercise)"	Azealia Banks	Unknown	Online exclusive	2011	
"Harlem Shake" (Remix) ‡	Baauer featuring Azealia Banks	Harry Rodriques; Héctor Delgado; Jayson Musson; Kurt Hunte Azealia Banks	Online exclusive	2013	
"Have Yourself a Merry Little Christmas" (Cover)	Azealia Banks	Hugh Martin; Ralph Blane	Icy Colors Change	2018	
"Heavy Metal and Reflective" †	Azealia Banks	Azealia Banks; James Strife; Julian Wodsworth	Broke with Expensive Taste	2014	
"Hood Bitch"	Azealia Banks	Unknown	Online exclusive	2012	
"I'm That..." (Remix) †	R. City featuring Beenie Man and Azealia Banks	Unknown	Non-album single	2015	
"Ice Princess" †	Azealia Banks	Azealia Banks; Jonathan Harris; Kevin James	Broke with Expensive Taste	2014	
"Icy Colors Change"	Azealia Banks	Azealia Banks; Matthew Cutler; Chris Young; Isley Juper; Dorian Strickland; Paul Falcone	Icy Colors Change	2018	
"Idle Delilah"	Azealia Banks	Azealia Banks; Kevin James; David Kennedy; Harvey Mason, Jr.	Broke with Expensive Taste	2014	
"II. Earth: The Oldest Computer (The Last Night)"	Childish Gambino featuring Azealia Banks	Azealia Banks; Donald Glover; Ludwig Göransson	Because the Internet	2013	
"Ima Read"	Azealia Banks	Unknown	Fantasea	2012	
"In Town"	Kevin Hussein featuring Azealia Banks	Azealia Banks; Kevin James	Cybersex	2015	
"JFK"	Azealia Banks featuring Theophilus London	Azealia Banks; Alexander Green; Kevin James; Theophilus London	Broke with Expensive Taste	2014	
"Jumanji"	Azealia Banks	Unknown	Fantasea	2012	
"L8R"	Azealia Banks	Unknown	Fantasea	2012	
"Liquorice" †	Azealia Banks	Azealia Banks; Matthew Cutler	1991	2012	
"Luxury"	Azealia Banks	Azealia Banks; Travis Stewart	Fantasea; Broke with Expensive Taste	2014	
"Mamma Mia"	Azealia Banks	Azealia Banks	Business & Pleasure	2020	
"Miss Amor"	Azealia Banks	Azealia Banks; Jack Fuller; Kevin James	Broke with Expensive Taste	2014	
"Miss Camaraderie"	Azealia Banks	Azealia Banks; Matthew Cutler; Jack Fuller	Broke with Expensive Taste	2014	
"Movin' On Up (Coco's Song, Love Beats Rhymes)"	Azealia Banks	Unknown	Fantasea II: The Second Wave	2018	
"Murda She Wrote"	Azealia Banks	Unknown	Unknown	2021	
"Nathan"	Azealia Banks featuring Styles P	Unknown	Fantasea	2012	
"NEEDSUMLUV (SXLND)"	Azealia Banks	Unknown	Online exclusive	2012	
"Neptune"	Azealia Banks featuring Shystie	Unknown	Fantasea	2012	
"Nirvana"	Azealia Banks	Unknown	Unknown	2020	
"No Problems"	Azealia Banks	Unknown	Fantasea	2013	
"Nude Beach A-Go-Go"	Azealia Banks	Azealia Banks; Kim Fowley; Harvey Mason, Jr. Ariel Rosenberg	Broke with Expensive Taste	2014	
"Out of Space"	Azealia Banks	Unknown	Fantasea	2012	
"P-U-S-S-Y"	Azealia Banks featuring 77KLASH	Unknown	Online exclusive	2009	
"Paradiso"	Azealia Banks	Unknown	Fantasea	2012	
"Partition" (Remix) ‡	Beyoncé featuring Busta Rhymes and Azealia Banks	Azealia Banks; Mike Dean; Jerome Harmon; Beyoncé Knowles; Timothy Mosley; Terius Nash; Justin Timberlake; Dwane Weir; Trevor Smith	Catastrophic 2	2014	
"Physical Motion"	Jimmy Edgar featuring Azealia Banks	Azealia Banks; Jimmy Edgar	XXX	2010	
"Playhouse"	Azealia Banks	Unknown	Online exclusive	2019	
"Pyrex Princess"	Azealia Banks	Azealia Banks; Kevin James	Business & Pleasure	2018	
"Queen of Clubs"	Azealia Banks	Azealia Banks; Jamie Iovine; Slim	Slay-Z	2016	
"Riot"	Azealia Banks featuring Nina Sky	Azealia Banks; Nina Sky; Leah Hayes; Slim	Slay-Z	2016	
"Runnin'"	Azealia Banks	Unknown	Fantasea	2012	
"Salchichon"	Azealia Banks featuring Onyx	Azealia Banks; Bruk-Up; Lil' Vicious	non-album single	2020	
"Salute"	Azealia Banks	Unknown	Fantasea	2012	
"Seventeen"	Azealia Banks	Unknown	Online exclusive	2009	
"Shady Love" (Note: Banks' vocals on "Shady Love" were uncredited.) †	Scissor Sisters vs. Krystal Pepsy	Azealia Banks; Jake Shears; Alexander Ridha	Magic Hour	2012	
"Silva"	Azealia Banks	Unknown	Online exclusive	2020	
"Six Flags" †	Azealia Banks featuring Slim Dollars	Unknown	Unknown	2021	
"Skylar Diggins"	Azealia Banks	Azealia Banks; Slim; Telli	Slay-Z	2016	
"Slow Hands" (Cover)	Azealia Banks	Paul Banks; Carlos Dengler; Sam Fogarino; Daniel Kessler	Online exclusive	2010	
"Soda"	Azealia Banks	Azealia Banks; Jack Fuller; SCNTST	Broke with Expensive Taste	2014	
"Succubi"	Azealia Banks	Unknown	Online exclusive	2012	
"The Big Big Beat" †	Azealia Banks	Azealia Banks; Jonathan Harris; Jack Fuller; An Expresso	Slay-Z	2016	
"The Kids Aren't Alright" (Remix)	Fall Out Boy featuring Azealia Banks	Azealia Banks; Pete Wentz	Make America Psycho Again	2015	
"Trap Queen" (UK Remix) †	Fetty Wap featuring Quavo, Gucci Mane and Azealia Banks	Azealia Banks; Radric Davis; Willie Maxwell; Quavo	Non-album single	2015	
"Treasure Island" †	Azealia Banks	Unknown	Fantasea II: The Second Wave	2018	
"Us"	Azealia Banks	Unknown	Fantasea	2012	
"Used to Being Alone"	Azealia Banks	Azealia Banks; Jack Fuller; Tony Igy	Slay-Z	2016	
"Van Vogue"	Azealia Banks	Azealia Banks; Travis Stewart	1991	2012	
"Venus"	Paul Oakenfold featuring Azealia Banks	Unknown	Online exclusive	2013	
"Wallace"	Azealia Banks	Azealia Banks; Kevin James; Filip Nikolic; Trevor McFedries	Broke with Expensive Taste	2014	
"What Are You Doing New Year's Eve" (Cover)	Azealia Banks	Frank Loesser	Icy Colors Change	2018	
"Work Bitch" (Remix) ‡	Britney Spears featuring Azealia Banks	William Adams; Azealia Banks; Ruth-Anne Cunningham; Sebastian Ingrosso; Otto Jettman; Anthony Preston; Britney Spears	Online exclusive	2013	
"Yung Rapunxel" †	Azealia Banks	Azealia Banks; Kevin James; Chadron Moore; Premro Smith	Broke with Expensive Taste	2013	
