= Azealia Banks discography =

Hip hop recording artist discography

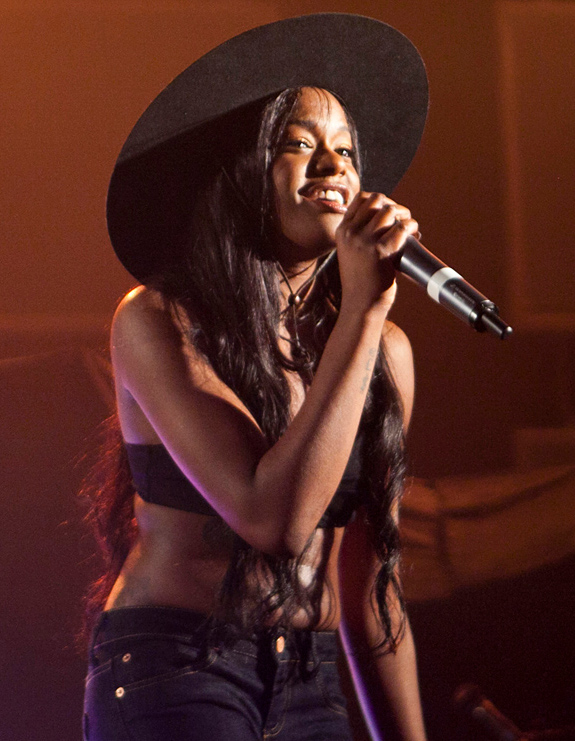
- Banks performing at the 2012 NME Awards
- Studio albums: 2
- Extended plays: 2
- Singles: 17
- As featured artist: 9
- Mixtapes: 3

American rapper Azealia Banks has released two studio albums, two extended plays (EPs), three mixtapes, twenty-six singles (seventeen as lead artist and nine as a featured artist) and twelve promotional singles. At the age of seventeen in November 2008, Banks adopted the stage name Miss Bank$ and signed to XL Recordings. However, she ended the contract with the label quickly afterwards due to conflicting ideas. In 2009, Banks released several songs onto the internet for free download, including "Gimme a Chance" and "Seventeen". Following her departure from XL Recordings, Banks dropped her stage name, opting to use her legal name, Azealia Banks.

In September 2011, Banks self-released her debut single "212", which charted on the record charts of several countries including Australia, Ireland, and the United Kingdom. The single was certified Platinum by the British Phonographic Industry. In 2012, Banks signed a record deal with Interscope and Polydor to record her debut studio album. During that time, she released her debut EP, titled 1991, which received favorable reviews from music critics. It was further promoted by the single "Liquorice". As of November 2014, the EP has sold 35,000 copies in the United States.

Banks self-released a free mixtape titled Fantasea in July 2012. In July 2014, Banks ended her contract with Interscope and Polydor, opting to sign to Prospect Park. In November of the same year, her debut studio album Broke with Expensive Taste was released after multiple delays. The album received positive feedback from critics and peaked at number 30 on the US Billboard 200. The album was preceded by three singles, "Yung Rapunxel", "Heavy Metal and Reflective" and "Chasing Time". In March 2015, a fourth single from the album, "Ice Princess", was released.

In March 2016, Banks released her second mixtape, Slay-Z, which featured collaborations with Nina Sky and Rick Ross. The mixtape was preceded by the single "The Big Big Beat" which was released in February of the same year. When the mixtape was commercially re-released, a promotional single, "Crown" accompanied the work as a bonus track. This was followed by the subsequent promotional singles "Escapades" (2017) and "Movin' On Up (Coco's Song, Love Beats Rhymes)" (2018).

Banks released the singles "Anna Wintour" and "Treasure Island" in 2018 under her most recent former label, eOne Music. In 2019, she released "Count Contessa", which dates back to 2013, as well as the promotional single "Pyrex Princess".

During late 2019, Banks temporarily released her third mixtape, Yung Rapunxel Pt. II on SoundCloud. The title references Banks' 2013 single "Yung Rapunxel". The mixtape would be released as one thirty-minute track consisting of 11 songs until it was eventually taken down. The single "Black Madonna" featuring producer Lex Luger followed in 2020, as did the promotional single "Mamma Mia".

In April 2026, Banks released the spoken word meditation album Zenzealia, marking a notable departure from her previous focus on the genres of hip-hop and hip house. The release is Banks' first studio album since her 2014 debut, and was self-released under the label Pleasure Place.

== Studio albums ==
List of studio albums, with selected details, chart positions and sales
Title	Details	Peak chart positions										Sales
Title	Details	US	US Indie	US R&B	US Rap	AUS	AUS Urb.	IRE	SCO	UK	UK R&B	Sales
Broke with Expensive Taste	Released: November 7, 2014; Label: Prospect Park; Formats: CD, digital download, LP, streaming	30	2	3	2	49	2	79	58	62	6	US: 31,000 (Note: Sales of Broke with Expensive Taste in the United States as of April 2015.); UK: 1,751 (Note: Sales of Broke with Expensive Taste in the United Kingdom as of November 2014.)
Zenzealia	Released: April 21, 2026; Label: Pleasure Place LLC; Formats: Digital download, streaming	—	—	—	—	—	—	—	—	—	—	

== EPs ==
List of extended plays, with selected details, chart positions, sales and certifications
Title	Details	Peak chart positions										Sales	Certifications
Title	Details	US	US Heat	US R&B	US Rap	AUS	AUS Urb.	IRE	SCO	UK	UK R&B	Sales	Certifications
1991	Released: May 28, 2012; Label: Interscope, Polydor; Formats: CD, digital download, LP, streaming	133	1	17	12	63	10	97	96	79	19	US: 35,000 (Note: Sales of 1991 in the United States as of January 2025.)	ARIA: Gold
Icy Colors Change	Released: December 20, 2018; Label: eOne; Formats: CD, digital download, LP, streaming	—	—	—	—	—	—	—	—	—	—		

== Mixtapes ==
List of mixtapes, with selected details
Title	Details
Fantasea	Released: July 11, 2012; Label: Self-released; Format: Digital download, LP, streaming
Slay-Z	Released: March 24, 2016; Label: Self-released; Format: Digital download, streaming
Yung Rapunxel: Pt. II	Released: September 11, 2019; Label: Chaos & Glory Recordings; Format: Streaming

== Singles ==
=== As lead artist ===
List of singles as a lead artist, with selected details, chart positions and certifications
Title	Year	Peak chart positions										Certifications	Album
Title	Year	US Dance	US Elec.	AUS	AUS Urb.	BEL (FL)	IRE	JPN	NL	UK	UK R&B	Certifications	Album
"212" (featuring Lazy Jay)	2011	—	—	68	20	17	7	—	14	12	3	BPI: 2× Platinum; RMNZ: 2× Platinum	1991
"Liquorice"	2012	—	—	—	—	73	—	—	—	—	—		1991
"Yung Rapunxel"	2013	—	—	—	25	—	—	—	—	152	30		Broke with Expensive Taste
"Heavy Metal and Reflective"	2014	—	—	—	—	—	—	—	—	—	—		Broke with Expensive Taste
"Chasing Time"	2014	12	—	—	—	—	—	48	—	—	—		Broke with Expensive Taste
"Ice Princess"	2015	—	—	—	—	—	—	—	—	—	—		Broke with Expensive Taste
"The Big Big Beat"	2016	—	—	—	—	—	—	—	—	—	—		Slay-Z
"Chi Chi"	2017	—	—	—	—	—	—	—	—	—	—		Non-album singles
"Anna Wintour"	2018	—	24	—	—	—	—	—	—	—	—		Non-album singles
"Treasure Island"	2018	—	—	—	—	—	—	—	—	—	—		Non-album singles
"Black Madonna" (featuring Lex Luger)	2020	—	—	—	—	—	—	—	—	—	—		Non-album singles
"Six Flags" (featuring Slim Dollars)	2021	—	—	—	—	—	—	—	—	—	—		Non-album singles
"Fuck Him All Night"	2021	—	—	—	—	—	—	—	—	—	—		Non-album singles
"Tarantula"	2021	—	—	—	—	—	—	—	—	—	—		Non-album singles
"Wings of a Butterfly"	2021	—	—	—	—	—	—	—	—	—	—		Non-album singles
"I Rule the World"	2022	—	—	—	—	—	—	—	—	—	—		Non-album singles
"Dilemma"	2023	—	—	—	—	—	—	—	—	—	—		Non-album singles
"—" denotes a recording that did not chart or was not released in that territory.

=== As featured artist ===
List of singles as a featured artist, with selected details
Title	Year	Album
"Control It" (Shystie featuring Azealia Banks)	2012	Gold Dust: Vol. 2
"Blown Away" (GypjaQ featuring Azealia Banks)	2015	Non-album singles
"I'm That..." (Remix) (R. City featuring Beenie Man and Azealia Banks)	2015	Non-album singles
"Trap Queen" (Remix) (Fetty Wap featuring Quavo, Gucci Mane and Azealia Banks)	2015	Non-album singles
"Wut U Do" (Newbody featuring Azealia Banks)	2019	Corporate Rave
"Hypnotic" (Paul Oakenfold featuring Azealia Banks)	2021	Non-album single
"Surprise Me" (Mallrat featuring Azealia Banks)	2022	Butterfly Blue
"New Bottega" (Torren Foot featuring Azealia Banks)	2023	Non-album single

=== Promotional singles ===
List of promotional singles, with selected details and chart positions
Title	Year	Peak chart positions				Album
Title	Year	BEL (FL) Tip	BEL (FL) Urb.	UK	UK R&B	Album
"BBD"	2013	—	—	—	—	Broke with Expensive Taste
"ATM Jam" (featuring Pharrell)	2013	55	37	169	39	Non-album singles
"Count Contessa" (Note: "Count Contessa" was originally uploaded to SoundCloud on September 13, 2013 however, it was officially released on streaming platforms on December 16, 2019.)	2013	—	—	—	—	Non-album singles
"Crown"	2017	—	—	—	—	Slay-Z
"Escapades"	2017	—	—	—	—	Non-album singles
"Movin' on Up (Coco's Song, Love Beats Rhymes)"	2018	—	—	—	—	Non-album singles
"Playhouse" (Note: SoundCloud exclusive)	2019	—	—	—	—	Non-album singles
"Pyrex Princess" (Note: "Pyrex Princess" was originally released on August 25, 2018 but was later taken down due to unknown circumstances. The song was re-uploaded to all platforms on December 16, 2019.)	2019	—	—	—	—	Non-album singles
"Slow Hands" (Note: "Slow Hands" is an Interpol cover that was originally released as an online exclusive in 2012 but was later released on all platforms on March 16, 2020.)	2020	—	—	—	—	Non-album singles
"Salchichón" (featuring Onyx)	2020	—	—	—	—	Non-album singles
"Mamma Mia"	2020	—	—	—	—	Non-album singles
"Nirvana"	2021	—	—	—	—	Non-album singles
"—" denotes a recording that did not chart or was not released in that territory.

== Other certified songs ==
List of other certified songs, showing year released, certifications and album name
Title	Year	Certifications	Album
"Luxury"	2012	BPI: Silver; RMNZ: Gold	Fantasea and Broke With Expensive Taste

== Guest appearances ==
List of non-single guest appearances with other performing artists, showing year released and album name
Title	Year	Other performer(s)	Album
"Physical Motion"	2010	Jimmy Edgar	XXX
"Can't Stop Now" (Kicks Like a Mule Remix)	2010	Major Lazer, Mr. Vegas & Jovi Rockwell	Lazers Never Die
"Blue Jeans" (Smims & Belle Remix)	2012	Lana Del Rey	Blue Jeans (Remixes) EP
"Shady Love"	2012	Scissor Sisters	Magic Hour
"II. Earth: The Oldest Computer (The Last Night)"	2013	Childish Gambino	Because the Internet
"Dark Red Lipstick"	2013	LoLa Monroe	Lipstick and Pistols
"The Kids Aren't Alright" (Remix)	2015	Fall Out Boy	Make America Psycho Again
"Everybody"	2016	Elliphant	Living Life Golden
