= Azealia Banks videography =

Azealia Banks video discography
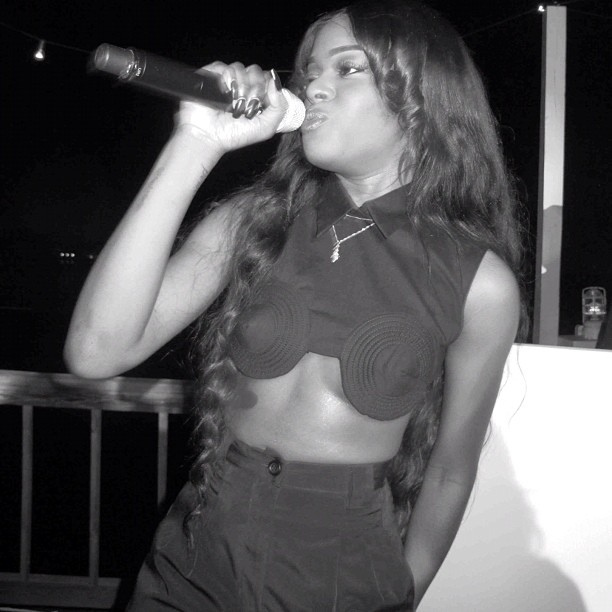
- Banks performing in 2012
- Music videos: 26
- Films: 2
- Television: 1
- Commercials: 2

American rapper Azealia Banks has appeared in twenty-three music videos, two films, one television program and two commercials. As a teenager, Banks studied at the LaGuardia High School of Performing Arts in Manhattan. A film opportunity arose through the school, and at the age of fourteen, Banks featured in the film The American Ruling Class, portraying a singer and a dancer in a cameo role. In 2010, Banks' first music video was released for a demo track titled "L8R", which would go on to be included on her debut mixtape Fantasea two years later. The following year, Banks' second music video was released for her breakout single "212", and has since amassed over two-hundred million views on Banks' official YouTube channel. During the promotional campaign of Banks' debut EP 1991, all songs on the project received a video treatment, including her sophomore single "Liquorice", shot by acclaimed director Rankin. Months after the video for "Liquorice" was released, an alternate version was leaked. In July 2012, Banks released her debut mixtape Fantasea. To promote the mixtape, Banks released three music videos for tracks on the project, "Luxury", "Atlantis", and "Fierce", the latter being shot with clothing company ASOS.

In 2012, Banks starred in two commercials for companies, the first was for Alexander Wang, in which she promoted the T by Alexander Wang clothing line, while the second commercial she appeared in was for Beats Electronics, in which she promoted Beats by Dr. Dre. In 2013, Banks released videos for two singles, "Yung Rapunxel" and "ATM Jam", and videos for collaborations with Shystie and Baauer. Throughout 2014, Banks released videos to promote her debut studio album Broke with Expensive Taste, including videos for "Heavy Metal and Reflective" and "Chasing Time". In March 2015, Banks released an interactive video for the song "Wallace", which received critical acclaim, with Paper ranking it as one of the most underrated videos from the prior year. In 2017, Banks starred in the film Love Beats Rhymes, playing the lead role of Coco, directed by RZA.

== Music videos ==
List of music videos that Azealia Banks has appeared in
Title	Year	Other performer(s) credited	Description	Ref.
"L8R"	2010	None	Filmed at a pool party, Banks makes hot dogs, plays party games, and is eventually filmed underwater as she performs the song in the company of her friends.	
"212"	2011	Lazy Jay	Banks' most successful song to date, the video takes place in a New York City alley, as she struts around in a Mickey Mouse jumper while performing the song.	
"Liquorice"	2012	None	Set in an outback ranch, Banks plays a cowboy who towards the end of the clip, battles a mirror of herself. She is also seen seductively eating hot dogs and dancing in the woods.	
"Liquorice" (Alternate version)	2012	None	In a lower budgeted, but similar setup to that of the official version, Banks is seen riding horses around a stable and walking through Paris at night.	
"Van Vogue"	2012	None	Banks floats in the water while performing this song. She is also seen dancing while waving a cane around in the air.	
"1991"	2012	None	A video that sees Banks pay homage to things related to the 1990s, including Madonna and Aaliyah, she performs the song in different scenes, one of which sees her backing dancers vogue throughout the video.	
"Luxury"	2012	None	Described as "chic" by Spin, Banks walks through New York City and performs on a rooftop, as her backing dancers perform choreography in the background.	
"Atlantis"	2012	None	Shot in front of a green screen, Banks rides CGI swordfish, sits on an underwater CGI throne and sports an array of seapunk outfits.	
"Fierce"	2012	None	ASOS partnered with Banks to produce this video. Shot with a shorter, clean version of the song, Banks seductively lies on a couch while modeling various ASOS stock.	
"Harlem Shake" (Remix)	2013	Baauer	Filmed in a recording studio, Banks dances, poses and flips her hair to the camera as she performs to her remix of the Baauer song.	
"Control It"	2013	Shystie	A video that showcases examples of BDSM culture, Shystie and Banks perform the track around a group of men on leashes, as Shystie sports a whip, intermittently striking the men with it.	
"No Problems"	2013	None	Filmed in Miami at the Ultra Music Festival, we see Banks behind the scenes of her appearance at the festival, as well as snippets of her performance. Steve Aoki and Diplo make cameos.	
"Yung Rapunxel"	2013	None	Banks plays a witch who endlessly attempts to evade the police, before being confronted and subsequently fighting them. The video includes visual symbolism, including one-eyed motifs, owls and Illuminati imagery.	
"ATM Jam" (Alternate Version)	2013	None	Banks and her crew pickpocket people in the subway, rob a supermarket and roam the streets in New York before Banks performs at her concert. Meanwhile, Banks dances in front of a NYPD cruiser as the cops are on the hunt for Banks and her crew.	
"ATM Jam"	2013	Pharrell	In this artificially colored video, Banks and her backing dancers are seen at various locations having fun. These locations include a rave, a swimming pool, and a penthouse.	
"Heavy Metal and Reflective"	2014	None	Banks escapes from being kidnapped and left in the desert, before leading a motorcycle gang through the terrain, arming herself with rottweilers.	
"Chasing Time"	2014	None	Filmed in black-and-white, Banks incorporates various CGI effects in the video, as she dances to the track in leather and sheet outfits.	
"Wallace"	2015	None	An interactive video, Banks' movements depend on the user's actions towards their camera. As the viewer maneuvers their arms across the screen, Banks' positioning changes, and certain reactions take place, including her blinking, smiling, and rotating.	
"Blown Away"	2015	GypjaQ	In this minimalist video, Banks and GypjaQ are alternatively seen via jump cuts, posing to the camera, using people as furniture and vomiting flowers.	
"Ice Princess"	2015	None	We see Banks as the frozen leader of a robotic ninja army. She leads her CGI army into battle with a volcano that produces multicolored clouds, that eventually end up destroying her.	
"Count Contessa"	2015	None	In this tropical-themed video, Banks dances on the beach after being told by a voodoo priestess that she will find true love.	
"The Big Big Beat"	2016	None	Banks pays tribute to her NYC roots, which finds her strutting down a fluorescent-lit hallway in a fringe jacket, then dancing ecstatically outside a Manhattan courthouse, then twerking atop an NYPD cruiser.	
"Escapades"	2017	None	In this minimalist video, Banks poses and dances in front of a white background whilst shots cut to a male dancer.	
"Soda"	2018	None	Banks walks through the desert and sits on rocks whilst shots jump to her band playing on the drums.	
"Anna Wintour"	2018	None	Banks dances both inside and outside an empty warehouse. Features a montage of scenes including Banks wearing shades in front of a mirror, walking down a catwalk, and using a megaphone.	
"Miss Camaraderie (Bon Vivant Remix)"	2021	None	Banks dances around George Segal's sculpture "Abraham's Farewell to Ishmael" at the Pérez Art Museum.	

== Films ==
List of films that Azealia Banks has appeared in
Year	Title	Role	Notes	Ref.
2005	The American Ruling Class	Empire Falls Singer and Dancer	Cameo	
2017	Love Beats Rhymes	Coco	Lead role	

== Television ==
List of television shows that Azealia Banks has appeared in
Year	Title	Role	Channel	Notes	Ref.
2013	NewNowNext Awards	Herself	LOGO	Performer	
2018	Nick Cannon Presents: Wild 'n Out	Herself	MTV	Performer and Team Captain	

== Commercials ==
List of commercials that Azealia Banks has appeared in
Year	Company	Product	Description	Ref.
2012	Alexander Wang	T by Alexander Wang	Banks' song "Van Vogue" plays as jump cuts of her dancing and spinning through the air play, with a superimposed T in the middle of the screen.	
2012	Beats Electronics	Beats by Dr. Dre	The advertisement consists of a montage of celebrities dancing to "Scream & Shout" by will.i.am and Britney Spears. Other celebrities seen in the ad include Lil Wayne, Zedd, 2 Chainz and Ellie Goulding.	
