= No Problem =

No problem is an English-language expression.

No Problem may refer to:

== Film and television ==
- No Problem! (TV series), a 1983–1985 British sitcom
- No Problem (1992 film), a Canadian animated short film
- No Problem (2010 film), a Bollywood film
- No Problem, a Marathi film of 2000

== Music ==
=== Albums ===
- No Problem (Al Cohn album), 1980
- No Problem (Chet Baker album), 1980
- No Problem (Fann Wong album), 2000
- No Problem (Sonny Rollins album), 1981
- No Problem, by MFÖ, 1987

=== Songs ===
- "No Problem" (Chance the Rapper song), 2016
- "No Problem" (Lil Scrappy song), 2004
- "No Problems", by Azealia Banks, 2013
- "No Problem", by deadmau5 from W:/2016Album/, 2016
- "No Problem", by Pusha T from the film Venom, 2018
- "No Problems", by DJ Kay Slay from The Streetsweeper, Vol. 2, 2004
- "No Problems", by Fat Joe from The Dark Side, 2010
- "No Problems", by Ginger Root from Shinbangumi, 2024
- "No Problems", by NOFX from Maximum Rocknroll, 1989
- "No Problems", by Status Quo from Rock 'til You Drop, 1991
- "Jambo - Hakuna Matata (No Problems)", by Boney M. from Kalimba de Luna – 16 Happy Songs, 1984
- "Si-Joya" ("No Problem"), by Duke Jordan from Flight to Jordan, 1960

== See also ==
- The "No-Problem" Problem, in spoken usage as a facet of systemic bias
