= Ice Princess (disambiguation) =

Ice Princess is a 2005 Disney film.

Ice Princess may also refer to:

- Tabaluga (film), a 2018 German film released variously as The Ice Princess, Ice Princess Lily, and The Ice Princess: A Tale of Fire and Ice in English-speaking countries
- Ice Princess, a Femizons character from the Marvel Comics universe
- "Ice Princess" (Sailor Moon), an episode of the manga series Sailor Moon
- The Ice Princess (novel), a 2003 crime novel by Camilla Läckberg
- Ice Princess saga, a series of episodes from the US soap opera General Hospital, revolving around the diamond of the same name which is stated to be the world's largest uncut diamond on the show
- "Ice Princess" (song) a 2014 song by American rapper Azealia Banks

== See also ==
- Siberian Ice Maiden, a mummy of a woman found in the Republic of Altai, Russia
