= Apple Juice Kid =

American drummer

- Born: Stephen Levitin
- Occupations: Producer, DJ, drummer
- Website: www.applejuicekid.com

Stephen Levitin (a.k.a. Apple Juice Kid) is an American record producer. Apple Juice Kid's production has been heard on songs by Mos Def, Azealia Banks, Wale, Camp Lo and MC Lyte. He has released several jazz remix albums with support from Okayplayer including Miles Davis Remixed and Frank Sinatra Remixed.

Apple Juice Kid is also a DJ and a drummer. He has been a guest DJ on Mark Ronson's East Village Radio. He has performed as a drummer in the studio with Timbaland, and on stage with The Foreign Exchange and The Jungle Brothers. Deepak Chopra interviewed Stephen for his One World program.

Levitin co-founded the Emmy Award winning Beat Making Lab, which began as a class in the Music Department at the University of North Carolina at Chapel Hill. His latest projects include DJing, releasing records on VP Records, Ultra Records and developing Beat Making Labs internationally with the support of Apple and PBS.

== Discography ==
=== Albums ===
- Sankofa – Five Elements
- Apple Juice Kid – Plus+,
- Thema Bryant – Sky
- Miles Davis Remixed – (illroots/okayplayer) (2008)
- Camp Lo – Stone and Rob Caught on Tape (Traffic) (2009)
- Freebass 808 – MoonBass EP with Geechi Suede from Camp Lo (La Universe) (2009)
- The Remix Project – Live Mixtape band with DJ, Drums, Keys, Bass, Percussion (illroots/okayplayer) (2009)
- Louis Armstrong Remixed – (illroots/okayplayer) (2009)
- Frank Sinatra Remixed – (illroots/okayplayer) (2010)
- Apple Juice Kid: Dance Clash (2011)
- Apple Juice Kid: Beats of a Revolution (2012)

=== Singles ===
- Azealia Banks - BBD
- Wale - Georgetown Press - Folarin
- Mos Def – 24 Hour Karate School (Blu Roc/DD172) (production with Ski Beatz)
- MC Lyte – Rockin with the Best (SGI/CMM) (production with Ski Beatz)
- Wale – My Sweetie (Spray It) – Attention Deficit (Allido/Interscope)
- Camp Lo feat. Styles P – On Smash (Traffic) (production with Cheeba)
- Yahzarah – The Tickler (purple reign)
- Tabi Boney – Rich Kids (Sky Republic)
- D.Woods (Danity Kane) – Mixtape tracks
- Pittsburgh Slim – Toy (Def Jam) (production with Ski Beatz)
- Fresh Daily – Untucked NumChucks (HighWater Music) (production with Ski Beatz)
- Yahzarah feat. Raheem DeVaughn – Come 2 Me (illroots/okayplayer)
- Cesar Comanche, Die in your Lap – Gulf2 – (ABB)

=== Other ===
- Lady Gaga (Remix) – Tramp Face
- Noisettes and Kanye West (Remix) – Mick Boogie and Terry Urban present Noisettes/Kanye Remixes – Somestimes I am Heartless
- Freebass 808 feat. Christian Rich – Mick Boogie and Terry Urban present Peter Bjorn and John Remixes – Living Thing
- The Beast Feat. Nneena Freelon and Freebass 808 – Freedom
- Camp Lo – Prod Ski and Apple Juice – 2009 NBC Superstars of Dance – Make Me Dance
- Freebass 808 feat Jovi Rockwell of Major Lazer – Rewind
- Pittsburgh Slim feat Dirt Nasty – Popular with the Ladies
- YahZarah Feat Raheem DeVaughn – Come 2Me
- Curtis Santiago – Prod Apple Juice Kid and Curtis Santiago – iBoo
- 10 Beats with Indigi Music placed on MTV, Vh1, Bravo
- Speed Network Theme Song – Freebass 808
- Apple Juice Kid – Plus
- The Remix Project – Mixtape – Okayplayer/illroots
