= BBD (song) =

Single by Azealia Banks

Promotional single by Azealia Banks

from the album Broke with Expensive Taste
- Released: January 1, 2013
- Recorded: 2012
- Genre: Trap; rave; hip-hop
- Length: 3:18
- Label: Interscope; Polydor
- Songwriters: Banks; Jonathan Harris; Kevin James
- Producers: Apple Juice Kid; Sup Doodle (co.)

Azealia Banks promotional singles chronology
BBD (2013)	ATM Jam (2013)

"BBD" (Bad Bitches Doit) is a song recorded by American rapper Azealia Banks for her debut studio album Broke with Expensive Taste (2014). It was released as the first promotional single from the album on January 1, 2013. Production of the song was handled by Apple Juice Kid, with Sup Doodle providing co-production for the track. Banks, Jonathan Harris and Kevin James all contributed to the song's writing. Critical reception of the song was generally positive, with critics claiming the song to be one of the first party anthems of the new year. Banks clarified on her Twitter account that "BBD" was not the first official single from Broke with Expensive Taste, writing "Y'all know i love dropping songs tho! Lol".

== Background ==
I got my start winning beat battles in NYC, and several people contacted me about producing for Azealia from her previous label years ago. Nothing ever happened, but when I saw Azealia on Twitter about two years ago I tweeted her asking if I could collaborate directly with her. She DM'd me her email, told me she remembered me from winning the beat battles, and for two years I have been emailing her beats every few months.

— Apple Juice Kid on collaborating with Banks.

In 2011, it was reported that Banks was working on her debut studio album with British producer Paul Epworth, despite not being signed to a record label at the time. In January 2012, Banks signed a deal with Interscope and Polydor Records to work on new music, and a month later, she announced the title of the album to be Broke with Expensive Taste. Banks released "BBD" on New Year's Day, premiering the song on her SoundCloud account, with it later being sent to radio the same month. The track was confirmed to be a part of Broke with Expensive Taste, when Banks posted the track listing of the album to her Instagram account. Approximately a year later, she handed a complete version of the album in to the labels, which included "BBD". Banks initially thought it would receive favorable reception from the labels; however, the representatives told Banks that she had not recorded a "hit" single for the album. Ultimately, Banks ended the record deal with Interscope and Polydor in July 2014. She later approached Jeff Kwatinetz and signed a contract with his company, Prospect Park, which ultimately led to the long-awaited release of Broke with Expensive Taste on November 7, 2014.

Throughout December 2014, Banks released a series of videos in which she gave a track-by-track commentary for all of the songs from Broke with Expensive Taste, and revealed how each song came to be, dubbed the '16 Days of Azealia'. During the commentary video for "BBD", Banks described the song as "another one of those records", going on to compare it to her earlier "rowdy" songs such as Fantasea's "Fuck up the Fun" and "L8R". She described the creation of the song as a process, summing it up as "I was like, ok, I'm gonna make a trap record".

== Composition ==
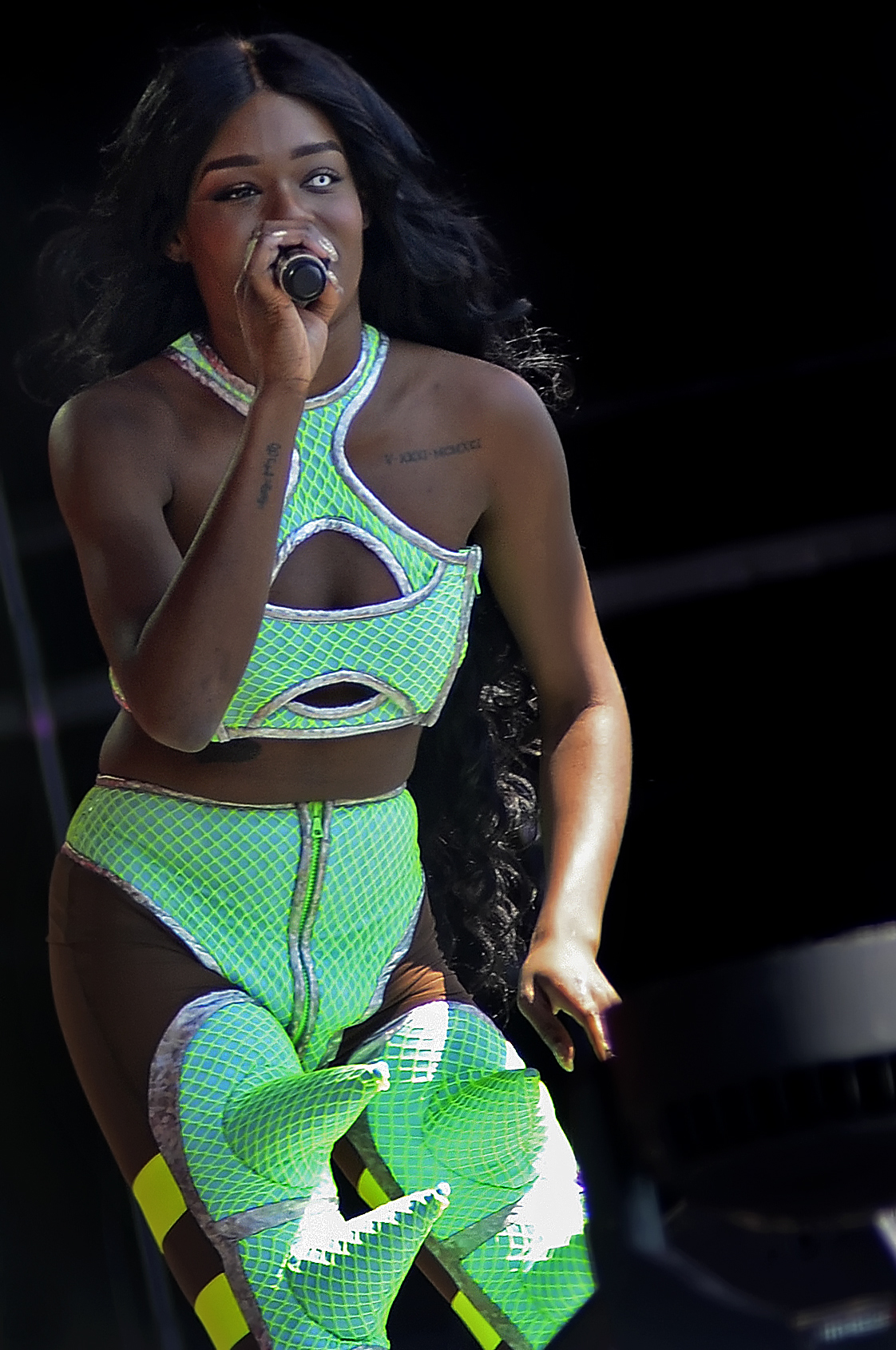
Banks performed "BBD" at the 2013 Glastonbury Festival.

"BBD" is a hip-hop song with heavy trap influences, that runs for a total duration of three minutes and eighteen seconds. Manny Faces from BirthPlace described the track as "a musically frantic, bass heavy stuttery-snare Apple Juice Kid/Sup Doodle-co-production", while one The Huffington Post writer described the song as "Chicago rave meets southern rap". HipHopWired writer Kazeem Famuyide thought that the track was "EDM-inspired", which allowed Banks to "show off of her rapid-fire flow", whereas MTV writer Phillip Mlynar described the tracks instrumental as a "slinky bopping beat". Genevieve Oliver from Pretty Much Amazing thought that the track "effortlessly amalgamates hip-hop and dance trends (a little trap-y, a little rave-y, Azealia said on Twitter; not to mention the song's title appears to reference Bell Biv Devoe) with her own already-classic rapid-fire, sassy wordplay". Maura Johnston from Pop Dust described the track as witch-hop, calling the song "minimalist and dark".

== Critical reception ==
The song received general acclaim from critics. Manny Faces from BirthPlace cited the song as an improvement from her previous material, writing "It’s a little harder, a little less sloppy and a little more promising than some of her previous efforts, many of which have drowned in sonic experimentation that, in some opinions (mine), haven’t done her any favors". A writer for PAPER hailed the track as "[The] first 2013 party jam", adding that the song "will jolt you awake this Wednesday morning more quickly than that venti coffee you've been nursing since 9 am". Rolling Stone writer Jody Rosen gave "BBD" three-and-a-half stars out of five, describing the song as "a typically fleet, flashy collection of disses and boasts that glory in estrogen power, Sapphic delights, and the fun of cuckolding stupid dudes". Spin writer Marc Hogan thought that the track reflected well on Banks' sense of style, writing "With the squiggly high-end and wobbly sub-bass of what we’re really calling trap-rave now, huh, plus some masterfully timed quiet-loud dynamic shifts, the track displays the virtuosically foul-mouthed rapper’s usual immaculately stylish beat selection".

== Live performances ==
Banks first performed "BBD" at the 2013 Glastonbury Festival, on June 29, 2013. She later performed the track during her set at the 2013 Reading Festival, on August 25, 2013. One writer for NME deemed "BBD" to be a highlight of Banks' set, citing its "explicit, bumping rhyme". Banks also included "BBD" on the set list to her Broke with Expensive Taste World Tour (2014–15). According to Dianca Potts, during Banks' gig at the Irving Plaza, "'BBD' and 'Wallace' were similarly received, the audience's enthusiasm building as each second passed". The track was also well received when performed in Europe, with The Independent writer David Pollock highlighting it as one of the best received numbers of the night, along with "No Problems" and "212".

== Credits and personnel ==
Credits adapted from Broke with Expensive Taste liner notes.

=== Credits ===
- "BBD" contains excerpts from "Swoop", as originally performed by ETX!ETC! and Brillz.
- "BBD" contains excerpts from "Trap Shit V9", as originally performed by UZ.

=== Locations ===
- Recorded at Glenwood Place Studios (Burbank, California)
- Mixed at Germano Studios (New York City, New York)

=== Personnel ===
- Vocals – Azealia Banks
- Songwriting – Azealia Banks, Jonathan Harris, Kevin James
- Production – Apple Juice Kid
- Co-production – Sup Doodle
- Engineering – Rick McRae
- Recording – Rick McRae
- Mixing – Rick McRae

== Release history ==
Region	Date	Format	Label	Ref.
Worldwide	January 1, 2013	Radio airplay; streaming	Interscope; Polydor	
