= Kelly Sheehan =

- Also known as: Madame Buttons
- Born: July 26, 1983 (age 43)
- Origin: Los Angeles, California, U.S.
- Occupations: Songwriter, Producer, Recording Engineer, Vocal Producer

Kelly Sheehan (born July 26, 1983), also known as "Madame Buttons", is a songwriter, producer, vocal producer and recording engineer from Los Angeles.

== Career ==
Kelly Sheehan has written songs for Kylie Minogue, Beyoncé, DJ Khaled, Mary J. Blige, Kim Petras, Kelly Clarkson, Snoop Dogg, Pharrell Williams and others. She has engineered and vocal produced songs for Justin Bieber, Mariah Carey, Chris Brown, Katharine McPhee, Tyrese, T.I., The Game, Akon, Ne-Yo, Charlie Wilson, Toni Braxton, Avant, Keri Hilson and others. Kelly Sheehan is signed to Dr. Luke's Prescription Songs and Sony Music Publishing as a songwriter as well as BMI.

== Select Discography ==
Recording Engineer

- Mariah Carey — "Touch My Body" (Island Def Jam, 2008)
- Nelly — "La" (Universal, 2008)
- Girlicious — "Like Me" (Geffen, 2008)
- Electrik Red — How To Be A Lady: Volume 1 (Def Jam, 2009)
- Ciara — Fantasy Ride (LaFace, 2009)
- Snoop Dogg — Malice N Wonderland (Capitol, 2009)
- Ciara — "Ride" (LaFace, 2010)
- Jamie Drastik — "Ride Freestyle" (Mr. 305 Records, 2011)

Songwriting

Albums

Nicki Minaj - Pink Friday: Roman Reloaded

- "Young Forever"

Jason Derulo - Future History

- "Pick Up The Pieces"

DJ Khaled – We the Best Forever

- "It Ain't Over Til It's Over" featuring Mary J. Blige, Fabolous & Jadakiss
- "Sleep When I'm Gone" featuring Cee-Lo, The Game & Busta Rhymes
- "My Life" featuring Akon & B.o.B

Rita Ora - Ora

- "How We Do (Party)"

Azealia Banks - Broke with Expensive Taste

- "Chasing Time"

Katharine McPhee - Hysteria

- "Hysteria"
- "Burn"
- "Only One"
- "Don't Need Love"

Singles

- Kylie Minogue - "Into The Blue"
- Karmin - "Crash Your Party"
- Beyoncé - "Grown Woman"
