= Wallace (song) =

Song by Azealia Banks

from the album Broke with Expensive Taste
- Released: November 7, 2014
- Recorded: 2007–2014
- Genre: Hip-hop
- Length: 3:50
- Label: Azealia Banks; Prospect Park
- Songwriters: Azealia Banks; Kevin James; Filip Nikolić; Trevor McFedries
- Producers: Nikolić; McFedries

"Wallace" is a song recorded by American rapper Azealia Banks for her debut studio album Broke with Expensive Taste (2014). The song was written by Banks, Kevin James, Filip Nikolić and Trevor McFedries, while production of the song was provided by the latter two. Lyrically, the track describes a man with a rottweiler head and depicts Banks killing him. Musically, the song is of both R&B and hardcore hip hop origins. In 2015, Banks released a music video for "Wallace" directed by Rob Soucy and Nick Ace. The video for "Wallace" was released via the Google Cloud Platform. Banks performed the song during the 2015 Coachella Festival and on her Broke with Expensive Taste Tour.

== Background ==
"Wallace"
A 23-second sample of "Wallace"'s chorus, a hip hop song with R&B influences and a "pounding" beat.

"Wallace" is a hip hop song that lasts for a duration of three-minute and fifty seconds, with R&B influences and a "pounding" beat. Brennan Carley from Spin described the song as Banks "float[ing] between islandy R&B and rapid-fire, corner-side spitting". Throughout December 2014, Banks released a series of videos in which she broke down tracks from Broke with Expensive Taste and revealed how each song came to be, dubbed '16 Days of Azealia'. During the commentary video for "Wallace", Banks revealed that she first received the instrumental for the song in 2007, from DJ Skeet Skeet. According to Banks, the instrumental was unused for a period of time, until she decided that she only needed the most original material for her album, it was at this point in which she wrote the song. In an interview with Complex, Banks stated that the song is about "being really hot and high and horny".

In January 2012, Banks signed a record deal with Interscope and Polydor Records to work on new music, and a month later, she announced the title of the album–Broke with Expensive Taste. A year later, she handed a complete version of Broke with Expensive Taste in to the labels. Banks initially thought it would receive favorable reception; however, the representatives told Banks that she had not recorded a "hit" single for the album. Ultimately, Banks ended the record deal with Interscope/Polydor in July 2014. She later approached Jeff Kwatinetz and signed a contract with his company, Prospect Park. Banks premiered "Wallace" during her tour in Glasgow, Scotland, on September 16, 2014. She eventually released the album on November 7, 2014.

== Critical reception ==
According to Neon Tommy's Coral Rucker, the song "gives off a unique perspective on relationships that’s rarely heard of anywhere". Rory Cashin of State wrote that the song sounds like "she is rapping while throwing furniture down the stairs". Hardeep Phull of the New York Post noted that the insulting nature of the song "will leave the rest of us snickering like tennagers". Complex placed "Wallace" 13th on its list of 'The 14 Best Rap Verses of 2014', commenting that a lot of people have missed the "impressive first verse" from the song.

== Promotion ==
Using people’s heads as a channel changer creates a one-to-one interaction with Azealia – it’s a personal interaction like being online with her and it mimics the call and response within the song.

— Director Nick Ace describes the concept of the music video

In June 2014, Banks shot a music video for "Wallace" in front of a green screen in New York. It was directed by Rob Soucy and Nick Ace, who previously directed the video for Banks' 2014 single "Heavy Metal and Reflective". On June 4, 2014, Banks uploaded two clips from the shooting to her Instagram account. More than a year later, a 25-second teaser for "Wallace" was uploaded on Banks' YouTube channel, with the full video being released on March 11, 2015, via Banks' official website. The video was produced by consultancy firm Collins, who used the Google Cloud Platform during development. In the interactive video we see Banks in a blank background, and as the watcher maneuvers their arms across the screen, Banks' positioning changes, and certain reactions take place, including Banks blinking, smiling, and rotating. Banks talked about the collaboration with Google, stating, "I’m such a huge fan of technology and creative new ways of interacting and engaging with fans, so this collaboration was perfect for me."

Brittany Spanos from the Rolling Stone called the video "trippy", commenting that it's as "inventive as her album Broke With Expensive Taste". Billboard's Lars Brandle also provided a favorable review for the video, commenting "you've never seen anything quite like it". According to Corban Goble of Pitchfork Media, it's not a "typical music video", because "the technology inserts your image into the video, like you're looking in a mirror". Taylor Weatherby from Entertainment Weekly wrote that there's only one word to describe the video and it's "trippy". In July 2015, Paper ranked the music video for "Wallace" as one of the most underrated videos from 2014. Amidst controversy between Nicki Minaj and Taylor Swift, concerning the fairness of the MTV Video Music Awards, Tshepo Mokoena from The Guardian claimed that if the process was truly based on quality, Banks' video for "Wallace" would have been nominated.

On April 10, 2015, Banks performed "Wallace" during her set at the Coachella Festival. Rap-Up commented that the audience's "energy was consistently high" during the performance. Adenike Gboyega of MOBO gave a positive review to Banks' performance, writing that Banks "flexed with some pretty impressive live vocals" during her performance. The song was also part of Banks' Broke with Expensive Taste Tour (2014–15).

== Personnel ==
Credits adapted from Broke with Expensive Taste liner notes.

Personnel

- Azealia Banks – songwriting, vocals
- Kevin James – songwriting
- Filip Nikolic – songwriting, production
- Trevor McFedries – songwriting, production
