= Black Madonna (song) =

2020 single by Azealia Banks

Single by Azealia Banks featuring Lex Luger

from the album Business & Pleasure
- Released: June 9, 2020
- Recorded: 2019–2020
- Genre: Hip hop
- Length: 2:10
- Label: Chaos & Glory Recordings
- Songwriter: Azealia Banks
- Producer: Lex Luger

Azealia Banks singles chronology
"Treasure Island" (2018)	"Black Madonna" (2020)	"Six Flags" (2021)

"Black Madonna" is a song by American rapper and singer-songwriter Azealia Banks featuring Lex Luger, who handled production on the track. Released on June 9, 2020, the song serves as the lead single to Banks' second studio album, Business & Pleasure, which was scheduled for a 2021 release.

== Background ==
In 2017, Banks released the song "Chi Chi" as the intended lead single from her upcoming album Business & Pleasure, however plans changed the following year when Banks shifted direction to focus on Fantasea II: The Second Wave which still awaits release. After separating from her previous record label eOne Music, Banks announced that her focus would return to Business & Pleasure as Fantasea II: The Second Wave was not "complete to her liking". Before the release of "Black Madonna", Banks released the promotional singles "Pyrex Princess" and "1-800-Nu-Checks" in 2019 and 2020 respectively. Both songs are intended to be included on Business & Pleasure.

On February 6, 2020, Banks published a draft of the Business & Pleasure track listing in which "Black Madonna" appeared as track two. Banks first teased the song on an Instagram live stream playing a demo version of the song. On May 22, 2020, Banks posted a snippet of the song on her Instagram account. Banks announced that "Black Madonna" would serve as the lead single to Business & Pleasure following the release of the song.

== Critical reception ==
The single was included on Pitchfork's "The Ones", a daily blog to highlight a select song curated by one of the site's specific team. Sheldon Pearce for Pitchfork praised the single stating that Banks is "up to her old tricks" and that "her bars are phonetically gnarly yet structurally sound. Her verses work even better in small bursts and her punchy cadences emulate the strong-arm tactics she raps about". Discussing both Banks and Luger, Pearce added "The song likely isn’t enough to restore them to former glory, but it is quite the reminder of just how formidable they can be". Torsten Ingvaldsen of Hypebeast called the track an "ice-cold banger" adding that Banks "takes no time to unleash her lyrical braggadocio".

Jon Powell of Revolt described Banks "delivering some of her grittiest, potent bars yet" on the song. Mitch Findlay of HotNewHipHop gave the track a "Very Hottttt" rating on the site as well as praising Banks and Luger stating that "The track finds her connecting with Lex Luger, who provides Banks with a lavish, ice-cold instrumental. It doesn't take long for Azealia to find her pocket, absolutely coasting over the beat with a confident swagger". He added that the single is "one of Banks' most intimidating drops in a minute".

== Credits and personnel ==
- Azealia Banks – vocals, songwriter
- Lex Luger – producer

== Release history ==
Country	Date	Format	Label	Ref.
Worldwide	June 9, 2020	Digital download; streaming	Chaos & Glory Recordings	
