= Curtis Santiago =

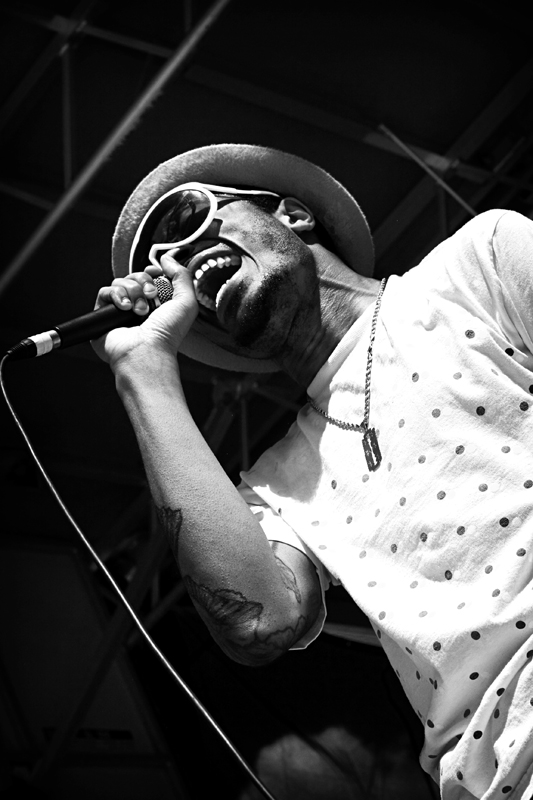
- Curtis Santiago performing in Edmonton on 2008-06-23

Background information
- Born: Edmonton, Alberta, Canada
- Genres: Dance-rock, soul, alternative R&B
- Occupation(s): Singer-songwriter, visual artist, dj
- Years active: c. 1996–present
- Labels: Finger Lickin', independent
- Website: curtissantiago.art

Curtis Santiago (born 1979, Edmonton, Canada) is a visual artist and dance-rock musician. As a musician, he was previously signed to Finger Lickin' Records. Santiago's paintings, installations and sculptures are exhibited internationally at museums such as the New Museum (New York, US) and Ludwig Múzeum (Budapest, Hungary).

Santiago has lived and worked in Toronto (Canada), New York, and Lisbon (Portugal). He's currently based in Munich, Germany.

== Musical career ==
In the late 1990s, he was a member of the Edmonton group the Hi-Phoniqs, a soul-oriented band. He left the city and the band in 2002 and moved to Vancouver to develop a solo career, and also worked as a club MC. In 2003, he won a CBC Galaxie Rising Star Award at NewMusicWest. He also founded the group Vendetta Republic. In early 2007 he began working with guitarist Mikey Schlosser. The duo moved their production headquarters to Toronto in 2008.

Santiago's mixtape Have Mercy was released in April 2009. The majority of the mixtape was produced by SkullKrushers and was presented by DJ Mick Boogie and Gakcity.com.

=== Discography ===
- 2002: Portrait of an Artist
- 2007: TKO
- 2009: Have Mercy
- 2012: Alien Tentacle Sex (as Talwst)

== Art career ==
Throughout the years, Santiago moved away from music and into the visual arts. His work consists out of paintings, large scale installations and sculptures, and miniature scenes – dioramas – depicting memories from Santiago's upbringing in Caribbean-Canadian culture. Dancing, party scenes, and nods to his musical career are recurring themes, often intertwined with (art) historical references.

Santiago's work is part of the permanent collection of the Studio Museum in Harlem (New York, US). He has exhibited, among others, at the Drawing Center (NY), Biennale de Dakar (Senegal), Toronto Biennale of Art, Aldrich Contemporary Art Museum (US), Goethe Institute (Berlin, Germany), Art Gallery of Ontario, Art Gallery of Alberta, and various international art galleries.
