= Chi Chi (Azealia Banks song) =

Single by Azealia Banks
- Released: June 5, 2017
- Recorded: 2016–2017
- Genre: Hip hop
- Length: 2:38
- Label: Global Records; Chaos & Glory Recordings
- Songwriter(s): Azealia Banks; Jonathan Harris
- Producer(s): Jonathan Harris

Azealia Banks singles chronology
| "The Big Big Beat" (2016) | "Chi Chi" (2017) | "Escapades" (2017) |

"Chi Chi" is a song recorded by American rapper Azealia Banks. The track was written by Banks, and produced by Jonathan Harris. Banks first premiered the song exclusively via her online store website CheapyXO.com. On June 6, the single became available to online music stores through Romanian record label Global Records.

The song's lyrics are built around the infamous line "Chi Chi, get the yayo" from the 1983 film Scarface, in which the lead character Tony Montana asks his friend Chi Chi to get the drugs they acquired. "Yayo" is in reference to cocaine.

== Background and release ==
"Chi Chi" features production from Jonathan Harris, whom previously collaborated with Banks on her album Broke with Expensive Taste (2014). "Chi Chi" was released to Banks' website, CheapyXO.com on June 5, 2017 for streaming. The song was released via iTunes for digital download.

The song was initially intended to be the lead single from Banks' upcoming album Business & Pleasure before later being scrapped and replaced with 2020 single "Black Madonna".

== Reception ==
A writer for Noise UK described the single as "So good that you’d want her to keep delivering. It’s certified fresh and unique". Adelle Platon, writing for Billboard was also highly receptive of the single, stating, "The Harlemite returned to her rap roots on Monday (June 5) with some dynamite called Chi Chi".

== Music video ==
Banks revealed in an interview with XXL Magazine that she had shot a music video for "Chi Chi" which she claimed was "eye-opening". The video failed to see a release.

== Credits and personnel ==
- Azealia Banks – vocals, songwriter
- Jonathan Harris – producer

== Release history ==
Release history for Chi Chi"
| Country | Date | Format | Label | Ref. |
|---|---|---|---|---|
| Various | June 5, 2017 | Streaming | Global Records | |
| Various | June 6, 2017 | Digital download | Global Records | |
