= No Problems =

Song by Azealia Banks

from the album Fantasea
- Released: January 4, 2013
- Recorded: 2013
- Genre: Hip-hop; diss
- Length: 4:14
- Label: Azealia Banks
- Songwriter: Azealia Banks
- Producer: Machinedrum

"No Problems" is a song released by American rapper Azealia Banks. It is a diss track aimed at American rapper Angel Haze. It was released on January 4, 2013, by Banks herself, after Angel Haze released a diss track titled, "On The Edge", a day prior. Production of the song was handled by American producer, Machinedrum.

== Background and release ==
The song was released on SoundCloud and online music stores on January 4, 2013. Prior to the release of the song, Banks stated on Twitter, "Lol I def used that energy to write a fly new jam tho. It's not even really a diss anymore! Haha !!!"; following Angel Haze's diss track. An unreleased music video to the song began surfacing on YouTube in the spring of 2013.

On March 2, 2018, ‘No Problems’ was included on the iTunes edition of the Fantasea mixtape, and replaced the tracks ‘Esta Noche’ and ‘Salute’.

== Critical reception and response ==
After the song was released, Haze responded on Twitter with, "I couldn't even play that weak shit all the way thru, bruh. ANYWAY 6pm. you some trash". The same day, Haze released another diss track entitled "Shut the Fuck Up". Celebrity blogger, Perez Hilton commended Haze on Twitter, Hilton himself previously had a feud with Banks.

== Release history ==
Country	Date	Format	Label	Ref.
Worldwide	January 4, 2013	Streaming	Self-released	
