= Chasing Time (song) =

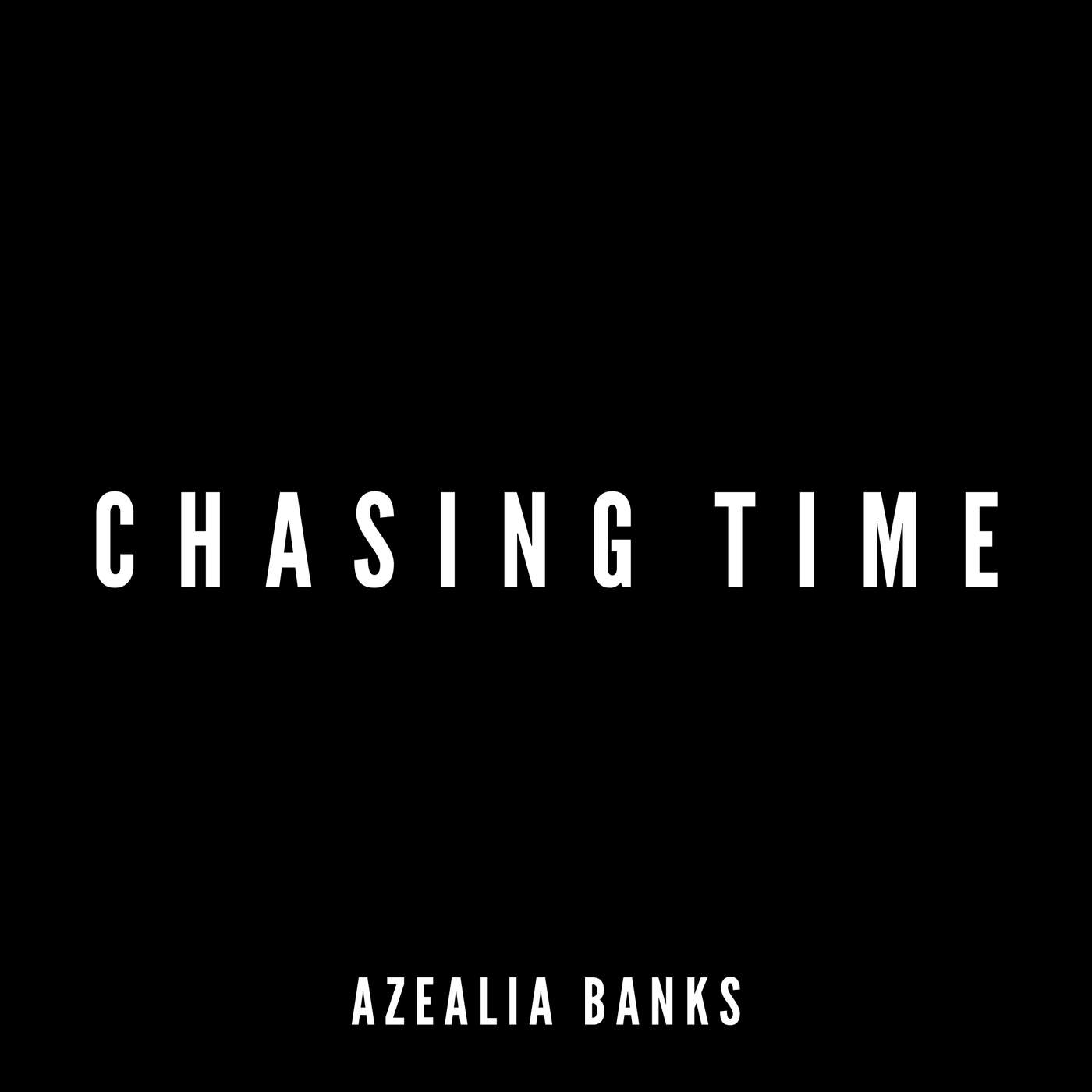

Single by Azealia Banks

from the album Broke with Expensive Taste
- Released: September 22, 2014
- Recorded: August 2013
- Genre: House; dance-pop
- Length: 3:30
- Label: Azealia Banks; Prospect Park
- Songwriters: Banks; Ronnie Colson; Warren "Oak" Felder; Andrew "Pop" Wansel; Jonathan Harris; Steve Mostyn; Kelly Sheehan
- Producer: Pop Wansel

Azealia Banks singles chronology
"Heavy Metal and Reflective" (2014)	"Chasing Time" (2014)	"Ice Princess" (2015)

Music video
- "Chasing Time" on YouTube

"Chasing Time" is a song recorded by American rapper Azealia Banks for her debut studio album, Broke with Expensive Taste (2014). It was released as the third single from the album on September 22, 2014. Production of the song was handled by Andrew "Pop" Wansel, while it was written by Banks, Ronnie Colson, Warren "Oak" Felder, Jonathan Harris, Steve Mostyn, Kelly Sheehan and Pop Wansel. Lyrically, the track discusses Banks recovering from a breakup.

"Chasing Time" received acclaim from music critics, with Mike Wass of Idolator commenting that the song included a "soaring chorus". To promote the single, Banks released a music video for "Chasing Time" on November 13, 2014, which was produced by Nina Dluhy-Miller and directed by Marc Klasfeld. Banks also held a contest in which she asked budding producers to submit remixes of "Chasing Time", with the winner receiving $10,000. Pitchfork Media included the track in their list of 'The 100 Best Tracks of 2014'.

== Background ==
In 2011, it was reported that Banks was working on her debut studio album with British producer Paul Epworth, despite not having signed to a record label at the time. In January 2012, Banks signed a record deal with Interscope and Polydor Records to work on new music, and a month later, she announced the title of the album as Broke with Expensive Taste. Approximately a year later, she submitted the complete version of Broke with Expensive Taste to her labels. Banks initially thought it would receive favorable reception from the labels, but the representatives informed Banks that she had not recorded a "hit" single for the album. Ultimately, Banks ended the record deal with Interscope/Polydor in July 2014. She later approached Jeff Kwatinetz and signed a contract with his company, Prospect Park. Banks eventually released the album on November 7, 2014.

Throughout December 2014, Banks released a series of videos in which she broke down tracks from Broke with Expensive Taste and revealed how each song came to be, dubbed the '16 Days of Azealia'. During the breakdown video for "Chasing Time", Banks revealed that the song was conceived after the aforementioned occasion of her handing a completed version of the album in to her labels. In response to their request that Banks created something more current, she produced "Chasing Time". This was further confirmed in an interview with Pitchfork Media's Jeremy Gordon, in which Banks said "it got to a point where they were like, 'Azealia, we get it, you’re cool, but we've spent $2 million on this record, can you just give us one [hit]?' So then I did 'Chasing Time', and I was just like, 'You know, this isn't gonna work out.'"

== Composition ==
"Chasing Time"
A 21-second sample of "Chasing Time", described as "diva house music".

"Chasing Time" is a song that runs for a duration of three minutes and thirty seconds. Jon Dolan from Rolling Stone described the song as "diva house music", going on to commend the tracks instrumental and Banks' vocal surge. In a later Rolling Stone article, Jon Blistein said that the song balanced an "eclectic" mix of influences, from Banks' fast rapping technique over the electronic-inspired beat to the "pop-diva" hook she performs on top of house production. Colin Stutz from Billboard described the song as a "hook heavy pseudo-sung track that rides the line with hip-hop and pop over some crisp house production", going on to label the track as seapunk. Elias Leight, also from Billboard, described the song's production as a mix of hip-hop, pop and dance beats, going on to describe how the track boldly shifts in genres throughout its duration, and that the track could be aimed at a man, or her former labels. Consequence of Sound's Dusty Henry noted that Banks "spends most of the time showing off her singing chops by wailing over booming, dance club beats".

Banks describes the track as genre-specific, citing pop-crossover and UK garage. On the song's lyrical content, she explained, "It's about the journey, the breakup is a part of it, but it's really about the journey". She went on to describe how the song fits into a larger puzzle of the album in which the album's opening track, "Idle Deliah", is the metaphorical morning, and later tracks on the album, including "Chasing Time" are representative of later in the evening.

== Critical reception ==
"Chasing Time" received generally positive reviews from critics. Rolling Stone's Jon Dolan gave the song three-and-a-half stars, commenting that Banks was "delivering a splashy anthem of resilience and determination in the face of romantic collapse". Mike Wass from Idolator concluded that Banks "genuinely shines in the soaring chorus", while observing the difference in style she displayed on the song compared to her earlier singles. While reviewing the music video of the single, Melissa Locker from Time commented that "Chasing Time" was "one of the more noteworthy songs" from Broke with Expensive Taste. Pitchfork Media's Tim Finney ranked the song as the 70th best track released in 2014.

== Commercial performance ==
"Chasing Time" first appeared on charts on December 27, 2014, debuting on the US Dance Club Songs chart at number 39. Over the duration of seven weeks, the song steadily climbed the chart, eventually peaking at number 12, remaining on the chart for a total of twelve weeks. Internationally, the song peaked at number 48 on the Japan Hot 100, as reported by Billboard.

== Promotion ==
=== Music video ===
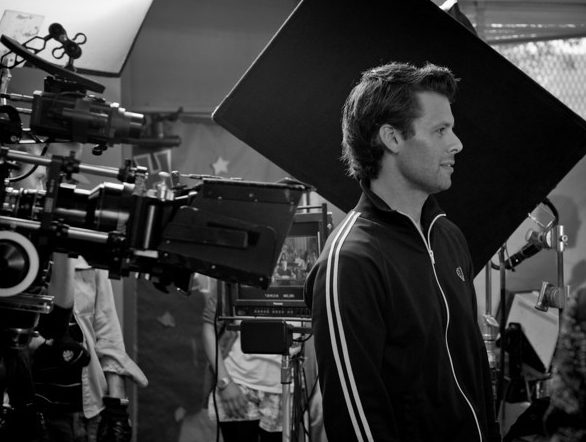
The music video for "Chasing Time" was directed by Marc Klasfeld (pictured).

A music video for "Chasing Time" premiered on MTV on November 13, 2014. The video was produced by Nina Dluhy-Miller and directed by Marc Klasfeld. John Walker from MTV likened the video past sci-fi themed videos, "the black and white visuals are as sleek and futuristic as some of the sci-fi music video greats" going on to compare the video to visuals for songs such as "No Scrubs" by TLC and "Scream" by Michael and Janet Jackson. Both Tom Breihan for Stereogum and Melissa Locker for Time commented on the obscenity of the video, both claiming that the video was only just safe for work. Melissa Locker from Time also called the video a "beautifully minimalist[ic] clip", going on to comment on Banks' likeness to Lil' Kim in one scene of the clip. Elias Leight from Billboard also compared Banks to past music stars, seeing three distinct similarities. He writes, "her ensembles call to mind three '90s acts: Missy Elliott (when Banks and her dancers wear trash-bag couture), Lil' Kim (in her famous nipple-pasty look at the 1999 VMAs) and TLC (in their 'No Scrubs'-era revealing space suits)".

=== Remix contest ===
In November 2014, shortly after the release of Broke with Expensive Taste, Banks announced that a contest would take place around "Chasing Time". The contest, for which Banks partnered with SoundCloud, BitTorrent and MTV, involved fans creating remixes to the song using stems made available to downloaded from BitTorrent, to then upload their entries to SoundCloud. The winner would receive $10,000, and their remix would become the first official remix to the track. Entries for the competition closed on December 15, 2014. Eliza Berman from Time commended the contest, commenting that the song's lyrics "practically beg for a remix", while revealing that there were a large variety in entries, with submissions ranging from acoustic to club sounds. The winners were announced on January 13, 2015. The second runner-up received tickets and backstage passes to one of Banks' upcoming shows, the first runner-up was allowed to spend the day with Banks in the studio, while the winner won the aforementioned $10,000.

=== Live performances ===
On April 10, 2015, Banks performed "Chasing Time" during her set at the Coachella Festival. Rap-Up commented that the audience's "energy was consistently high" during the performance. The song was also part of Banks' Broke with Expensive Taste Tour (2014–15).

== Track listing ==
Digital download
No.	Title	Length
1.	"Chasing Time" (explicit)	3:30
2.	"Chasing Time" (clean)	3:30

== Credits and personnel ==
Credits adapted from Broke with Expensive Taste liner notes.

Locations

- Recorded at Mason Sound and Glenwood Place studios (North Hollywood, California)
- Mixed at The Fortress of Amplitude studios (Los Angeles, California)

Personnel

- Vocals – Azealia Banks
- Songwriting – Azealia Banks, Ronnie Colson, Warren "Oak" Felder, Jonathan Harris, Steve Mostyn, Kelly Sheehan, Andrew "Pop" Wansel
- Production – Pop Wansel
- Mixing – Rob Kinelski
- Mixing assistant – David Baker

== Charts ==
Chart (2014–15)	Peak position
Japan Hot 100 (Billboard)	48
US Dance Club Songs (Billboard)	12

== Release history ==
Region	Date	Format	Label	Ref.
Various	September 22, 2014	Digital download	Azealia Banks Records	
