= Broke with Expensive Taste =

Studio album by Azealia Banks
- Released: November 7, 2014
- Recorded: 2011–2014
- Genres: Alternative hip-hop; dance-pop; hip house
- Length: 60:19
- Labels: Azealia Banks; Prospect Park; Caroline
- Producers: Apple Juice Kid; Araabmuzik; Ariel Pink; Boddika; Enon; Lazy Jay; Lil Internet; Lone; Machinedrum; M. J. Cole; Oskar Cartaya; Pearson Sound; Pop Wansel; SCNTST; Sup Doodle; Yung Skeeter

Azealia Banks chronology
Fantasea (2012)	Broke with Expensive Taste (2014)	Slay-Z (2016)

Singles from Broke with Expensive Taste
- 1. "Yung Rapunxel" Released: April 16, 2013; 2. "Heavy Metal and Reflective" Released: July 28, 2014; 3. "Chasing Time" Released: September 22, 2014; 4. "Ice Princess" Released: March 23, 2015

Broke with Expensive Taste is the debut studio album by American rapper Azealia Banks, released on November 7, 2014. Banks began working on the album in 2011 despite being unsigned to a record label at that time. A year later, she signed a contract deal with Interscope and Polydor Records to work on the album. However, she felt dissatisfied with the labels' representatives and consequently, she ended the contract with the labels in July 2014 and signed to Prospect Park. After being delayed for over two years, Broke with Expensive Taste was released by Banks herself and Prospect Park via Caroline Records without any prior announcements. The album reportedly cost over $2 million to produce.

Broke with Expensive Taste was described as a hip house and dance-pop record which incorporates elements from a wide range of genres, including hardcore punk, punk, trance, bounce, R&B and UK garage. The album received widespread critical acclaim from music critics, who praised Banks' musical diversity and opined the album was "worth the wait".

The record spawned four singles: "Yung Rapunxel", "Heavy Metal and Reflective", "Chasing Time", and "Ice Princess". Broke with Expensive Taste peaked at number 30 on the US Billboard 200 and appeared on record charts of other five countries: Australia, Scotland, Belgium, Ireland, and the United Kingdom. Since its release, the album has accumulated over 700 million streams on Spotify.

== Background ==
In 2011, it was reported that Banks was working on a studio album with British producer Paul Epworth despite not having signed to a particular record label at that time. In January 2012, Banks signed a record deal with Interscope and Polydor Records to work on her album, and a month later, she announced the title of the album—Broke with Expensive Taste. Approximately a year later, she handed a complete album in to the labels. Banks initially thought that the album would receive favorable reception from the labels; however, the representatives told Banks that she had not recorded a "hit" single for the album. She consequently recorded a song called "Chasing Time" for the project, yet the label denied the track and forced Banks to choose "Soda" as the lead single, which made Banks become incredulous. Ultimately, Banks ended the record deal with Interscope/Polydor in July 2014. She later approached Jeff Kwatinetz and signed a contract with his company, Prospect Park. She revealed her dissatisfaction to Rolling Stone,

I just spent a whole 'nother fuckin' four months in the studio trying to come up with some shit, and you want to go with fuckin' 'Soda'? I really just lost it. That was the day you saw me on Twitter, like, 'The fuck? I'm tired of talking to these white guys about my shit.' It felt like they were playing some sort of head game. And you know I love conspiracy theories. I was like, 'They're trying to brainwash me! Fuck these guys!'

== Music and lyrics ==
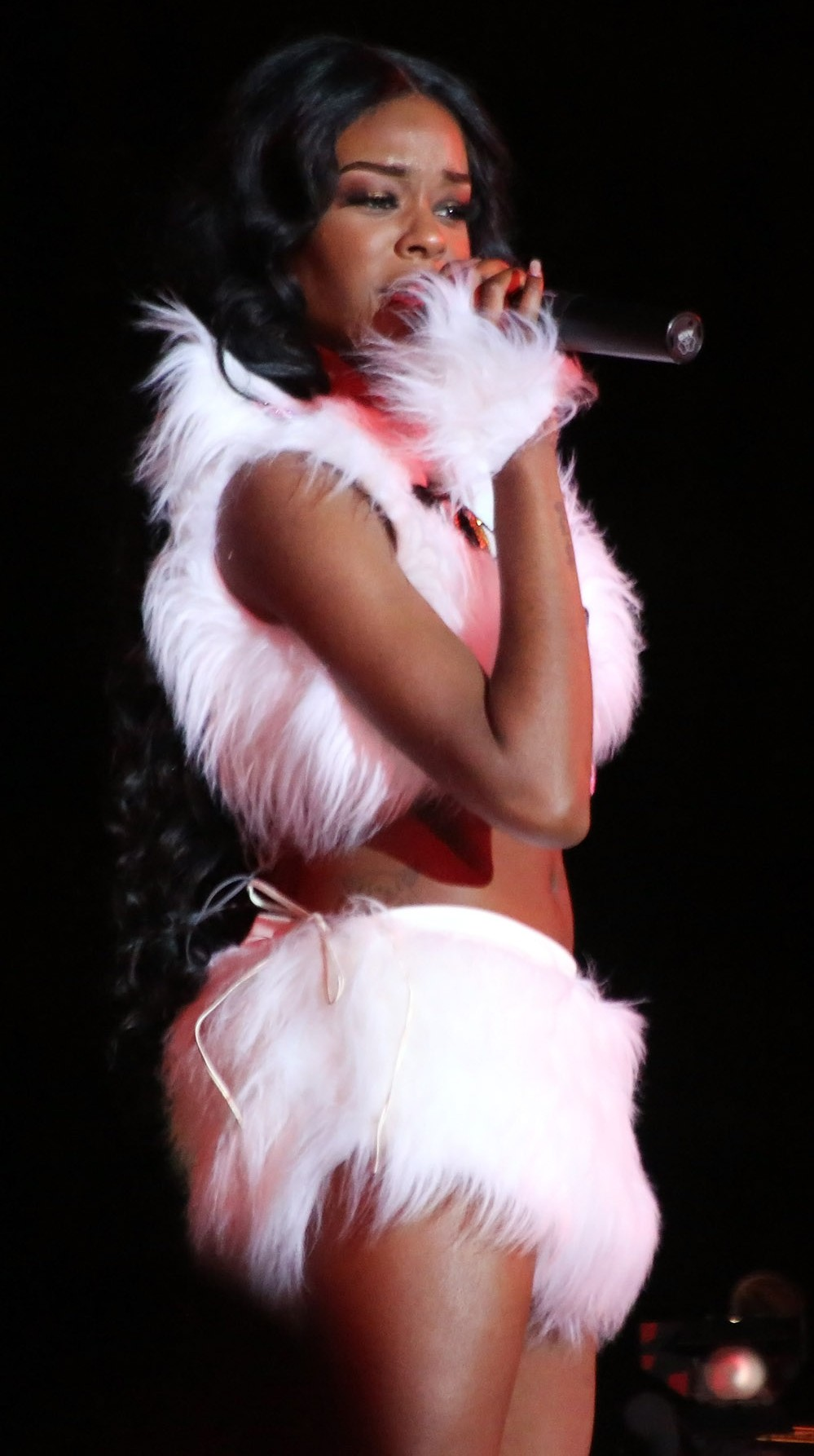
Banks performing at Life Ball in Vienna, Austria, May 2013

In regard to the album's sound, Banks has stated that she was aiming for something "just as stylish and authentic as anything that I do." She added that she did not want to do anything "young [or] mainstream" and described the album as "anti-pop". Steven J. Horowitz from Billboard characterized Broke with Expensive Taste as a hip house record with touchstones from R&B, UK garage, Bounce music and drum and bass. Mark Guiducci of Vogue noted the elements of trance and trap, while The Observer's Suzie McCracken described the record as "an aggressive strain of hip-hop" blending with UK garage, deep house and trap. Writing for The New York Times, Jon Pareles also detailed the fusion of Caribbean beats, punk and surf rock. On behalf of The Irish Times, reviewer Jim Carroll called Broke with Expensive Taste an album of "dance-pop gallivanting".

The album opens with "Idle Delilah", a glitchy mid-tempo track that contains "tropical, thuggish and quirky" sounds and was compared to the work of Lauryn Hill and Missy Elliott due to its use of both rapping and singing, which were noted for being rugged and velvety. "Gimme a Chance" contains feather-light synths, an '80s-style sample, bold brass instruments and haphazard DJ scratches. The song's production changes towards the end and takes influence from a bachata groove, while Banks sings in Spanish. "Ice Princess" is an uptempo song that juxtaposes a sample of Morgan Page's 2011 dance song "In the Air" against a heavy trap drum pattern.

"Yung Rapunxel" sees Banks alternating between rapping and shouting over a manic '90s Hi-NRG-influenced "witch-hop" beat. "Heavy Metal and Reflective" is built over clanging synths and wobbling bass with elements of Bounce. "Chasing Time" is a dance-pop track, that takes influence from UK garage, deep house and jazz music. "Nude Beach a-Go-Go" is an alternate take on Ariel Pink's song of the same name, which is featured on Pom Pom (2014).

== Release and promotion ==
In July 2013, Banks announced that the record would be released in the following fall; however, this was delayed to January, and again to March 2014. Ultimately, the album was released by Banks and Prospect Park via Caroline Records on November 7, 2014, without any prior announcements. In December 2013, Banks announced the first four tour dates in support of the album. The tour was set to begin in March 2014 in Glasgow, Scotland. However, in early March 2014, weeks before the opening date, Banks rescheduled the tour dates and cancelled some as the album's release was delayed. The rescheduled tour took place in Europe throughout September.

In January 2015, Banks began to announce tour dates to support the album. Touring began in Japan, in March 2015, and extended throughout the year. The tour marks Banks' first concert in New York since performing at the Bowery Ballroom in 2012 for her debut tour, The Mermaid Ball. Banks also played festivals to support the album, including Coachella, Reading and Leeds, and Glastonbury. Banks earned over $1 million dollars between 2012 and 2013, primarily from touring. She was also dubbed 'Hip-Hops Cash Princess' by Forbes.

== Singles ==
In January 2013, Banks announced that the album's lead single would be "Miss Amor", which would be accompanied by "Miss Camaraderie" as a B-side. Ultimately, the plan was cancelled and later that month, she confirmed that "Yung Rapunxel" would be the official lead single from Broke with Expensive Taste. The track was made available for streaming via SoundCloud in March 2013, and was released for digital sales a month later. "Yung Rapunxel" peaked at number 25 and 152 on the Australian Urban Singles Chart and UK Singles Chart, respectively.

On May 6, 2013, Banks announced that "ATM Jam" featuring Pharrell would serve as the second single from Broke with Expensive Taste. It was released on July 11, 2013. However, due to negative fan feedback and personal disinterest regarding the song, Banks later announced that "ATM Jam" would be removed from the album.

The second official single from Broke with Expensive Taste was "Heavy Metal and Reflective", which was released for digital sales on July 28, 2014. The song peaked at number 40 on the UK Indie Chart. Due to a leak of the song, "Chasing Time" was rush-released as the third single from the project, being released on September 22, 2014, a day after the leak. On March 23, 2015, "Ice Princess" was released as the fourth single from Broke with Expensive Taste. The music video for "Ice Princess", filmed on February 2 and 3, 2015 in Montreal, Quebec, Canada, was released on March 31, 2015.

In further promotional efforts for the album, a music video for a non-single track "Wallace" was filmed in April 2014 in New York City and released on March 11, 2015. The video is an interactive project released through Google Cloud. Years later on March 20, 2018, Banks released the music video for non-single "Soda". The video portrays Banks walking through the desert and sitting on rocks whilst shots jump to her band playing on the drums.

== Reception and legacy ==
Professional ratings
Aggregate scores
Source	Rating
AnyDecentMusic?	7.3/10
Metacritic	77/100
Review scores
Source	Rating
AllMusic	3/5 stars
Billboard	3.5/5 stars
Cuepoint (Expert Witness)	A
The Guardian	3/5 stars
Los Angeles Times	3/4 stars
NME	7/10
The Observer	4/5 stars
Pitchfork	8.0/10
Rolling Stone	3.5/5 stars
The Times	4/5 stars

Broke with Expensive Taste was met with widespread acclaim and positive reviews from critics. The album was mainly celebrated for it fearless blend of genres that combine house rap, UK garage, calypso, and pop-rap. At Metacritic, which assigns a normalized rating out of 100 to reviews from mainstream publications, the album received an average score of 77, based on 26 reviews, indicating "generally favorable reviews".

In Rolling Stone, Suzy Exposito hailed the record as possibly "the year's boldest release", while Matthew Horton from NME called it "a cascading flood of madcap imagination". Suzie McCracken of The Observer deemed it "a contender for album of the year" while praising the music's eclecticism: "Banks immerses herself in 90s nostalgia, spitting darkly and sharply over tracks full of elements of UK garage, deep house and trap (an aggressive strain of hip-hop)." Brennan Carley from Spin felt that Banks displayed a "burst of personality" and on an album "dripping in confidence, class, bursts of brilliance, and personality". Critic Robert Christgau commended her vocal performances but stated that while her understanding of sex was more dynamic than her male counterparts', "her troubles are the usual star-time overindulgences, and just about every terrific song here is a boast one way or another. Yet just about every song is a serious pleasure regardless."

In a less enthusiastic review for Clash, Mike Diver felt the album was as much enjoyable as it was "schizophrenic and really quite silly in places". Nolan Feeney of Time qualified his praise of Banks' ability to make the lines in her raps sound melodious: "She lines up syllables like a firing squad, repeating the same sounds and hums and clicks with a sing-song-y cadence. When she's in the zone, it's vaguely hypnotic. The downside is that it's also a limited tool set — her flows sometimes sound too much like her other verses. Get deep into one Azealia Banks song, and you'll often hear a line or two that remind you of another." Fred Thomas from AllMusic said the record's highlights, including "the time-tested singles", were spoiled by musically incongruous filler, making it feel "like a piecemeal collection of tracks that spike and dip in terms of quality and intent".

Broke with Expensive Taste appeared on several publications' lists of 2014's best albums. It was ranked number 38 by Spin, number 25 by Pitchfork, number 15 by Complex, number 10 by Boston Globe critic James Reed and Nolan Feeney from Time, and number 3 by Jon Pareles of The New York Times and Cosmopolitan editor Eliza Thompson. In Rolling Stone's list of the year's best rap records, it was named the 10th best and "the sort of effortless triumph that deserves to outshine the Internet circus". Broke with Expensive Taste was also voted the 14th best album of 2014 in the Pazz & Jop, an annual poll of American critics nationwide, published by The Village Voice. Robert Christgau, the poll's creator, named it the year's 7th best album in his own ballot. In 2022, Rolling Stone placed it on their list of the '200 Greatest Hip Hop Albums of All Time'. Many musicians have cited Broke with Expensive Taste's blueprint as a major influence to their musical style, including Vince Staples, Rico Nasty, Zebra Katz, as well as indie-electronic artist Ariel Pink, who collaborated on the track titled "Nude Beach a-go-go".

== Commercial performance ==
Broke with Expensive Taste debuted at number 62 on the UK Albums Chart for the week ending November 15, 2014, with 1,751 copies sold. The album debuted at number 30 on the US Billboard 200, selling 11,000 copies. In its second week of sales, the album dropped to number 105 on the chart, selling an additional 4,096 copies. As of April 2015, Broke with Expensive Taste has sold 31,000 copies in the United States. Since its release in 2014, it has accumulated over 700 million streams on Spotify.

== Track listing ==
Credits were adapted from the digital booklet.

Broke with Expensive Taste track listing
No.	Title	Writer(s)	Producer(s)	Length
1.	"Idle Delilah"	Azealia Banks; David Kennedy; Kevin James; Harvey Mason, Jr.	Pearson Sound	4:32
2.	"Gimme a Chance"	Banks; James; Mason, Jr; Enon; Oskar Cartaya	Enon; Oskar Cartaya	3:54
3.	"Desperado"	Banks; James; Mason, Jr; M. J. Cole	M. J. Cole	3:57
4.	"JFK" (featuring Theophilus London)	Banks; London; James; Alexander Green	Boddika	5:00
5.	"212" (featuring Lazy Jay)	Banks; Jef Martens	Lazy Jay	3:25
6.	"Wallace"	Banks; James; Filip Nikolić; Trevor McFedries	Yung Skeeter; Filip Nikolić	3:51
7.	"Heavy Metal and Reflective"	Banks; James Strife; Julian Wodsworth	Lil Internet	2:37
8.	"BBD"	Banks; James; Jonathan Harris	Apple Juice Kid; Sup Doodle	3:18
9.	"Ice Princess"	Banks; James; Harris	AraabMuzik	3:43
10.	"Yung Rapunxel"	Banks; James; Premro Smith; Chadron Moore	Lil Internet	4:00
11.	"Soda"	Banks; SCNTST; Jack Fuller	SCNTST	3:43
12.	"Chasing Time"	Banks; Harris; Warren "Oak" Felder; Ronnie Colson; Steve Mostyn; Andrew "Pop" Wansel; Kelly Sheehan	Pop Wansel	3:30
13.	"Luxury"	Banks; Travis Stewart	Machinedrum	2:48
14.	"Nude Beach a-Go-Go"	Banks; Mason, Jr; Ariel Rosenberg; Kim Fowley	Ariel Pink	2:20
15.	"Miss Amor"	Banks; James; Fuller	Lone	4:28
16.	"Miss Camaraderie"	Banks; Fuller; Cutler	Lone	5:09
Total length:				60:19

Japanese deluxe edition
No.	Title	Length
17.	"Chasing Time" (Amorphous Atmospheric Trap Remix)	5:26

Sample credits

- "Idle Delilah" contains excerpts from "WAD" by Pearson Sound
- "Gimme a Chance" contains excerpts from "Knock That Door" by Enon
- "Desperado" contains excerpts from "Banderlero Desperado" by MJ Cole
- "JFK" contains excerpts from "Breezin'" by Boddika
- "212" contains elements of "Float My Boat" by Lazy Jay
- "Ice Princess" contains samples from "In the Air" by Morgan Page featuring Angela McCluskey
- "Yung Rapunxel" contains a sample of "No More Drama" by Mary J. Blige and "Fuck da' Haters" by Ruff Ryders and samples a portion of "Stop Playing Games" by 8Ball
- "Miss Amor" contains excerpts from "Coreshine Voodoo" by Lone
- "Miss Camaraderie" contains excerpts from "Rapid Racer" by Lone

== Personnel ==
Credits were adapted from AllMusic.

- Lone - production and songwriter
- Steve Ace – production
- The Apple Juice Kid – production
- AraabMuzik – production
- David Baker – mixing assistance, vocal engineering
- Azealia Banks – A&R, composition, executive production, vocals
- David Boyd – assistance, engineering assistance, engineering, vocal engineering
- Oskar Cartaya – composition
- Ronald "Flippa" Colson – composition
- Nick Conceller – engineering, mixing
- Calum Crease – art direction
- Warren "Oak" Felder – composition
- Flippa123 – production
- James Strife – composition
- Jack Fuller – composition
- Jonathan Harris – composition
- Andrew Hey – bass, engineering, guitar, horn engineering, vocal engineering
- Dan Higgins – clarinet
- Kevin James – composition
- Rob Kinelski – mixing
- Dave Kutch – mastering
- Lazy Jay – vocals
- Theophilus London – composition, vocals
- Jef Martens – composition, production
- Harvey Mason, Jr. – composition, vibraphone
- Trevor McFedries – composition, production
- Ric McRae – engineering, mixing
- Steve Mostyn – composition
- Filip Nikolić – composition, production
- Oakwud – production
- Abraham Orellana – composition
- Ariel Pink – composition, production
- Rob Sizwe Price-Guma – engineering assistance, engineering
- Scntst – composition, production
- Kelly Sheehan – composition, engineering
- Travis Stewart – composition, production
- The Underdogs – additional production, executive production
- Julian "Lil Internet" Wadsworth – composition, production
- Andrew "Pop" Wansel – composition

== Charts ==
Chart (2014)	Peak position
Australian Albums (ARIA)	49
Australian Urban Albums (ARIA)	2
Belgian Albums (Ultratop Flanders)	197
Irish Albums (IRMA)	79
Irish Independent Albums (IRMA)	15
Scottish Albums (Official Charts)	58
UK Albums (Official Charts)	62
UK Independent Albums (Official Charts)	5
UK R&B Albums (Official Charts)	6
US Billboard 200	30
US Independent Albums (Billboard)	2
US Top R&B/Hip-Hop Albums (Billboard)	3

== Certifications ==
Region	Certification	Certified units/sales
New Zealand (RMNZ)	Gold	7,500^{‡}
^{‡} Sales+streaming figures based on certification alone.

== Release history ==
Region	Date	Format	Label	Ref.
Various	November 7, 2014	Digital download; streaming	Azealia Banks; Prospect Park	
United States	March 3, 2015	CD	Prospect Park	
United Kingdom	March 20, 2015	CD	Caroline International	
United States	October 29, 2015	2xLP	Prospect Park	
