= Yung Rapunxel =

Single by Azealia Banks

from the album Broke with Expensive Taste
- Released: April 16, 2013
- Recorded: 2012
- Genre: Industrial; hip house
- Length: 3:45 (single version); 4:00 (album version)
- Label: Interscope; Polydor
- Songwriters: Azealia Banks; Kevin "SB" James; Premro Smith; Chadron Moore
- Producer: Lil Internet

Azealia Banks singles chronology
"Liquorice" (2012)	"Yung Rapunxel" (2013)	"Heavy Metal and Reflective" (2014)

Music video
- "Yung Rapunxel" on YouTube

"Yung Rapunxel" (stylized as #YUNGRAPUNXEL) is a song recorded by American singer/rapper Azealia Banks for her debut studio album titled Broke with Expensive Taste. Interscope Records released the song as the album's first single to mainstream radio on April 16, 2013. The track contains an interpolation of the song "No More Drama" by R&B singer Mary J. Blige. On March 11, 2013, the song was made available for online streaming via SoundCloud. The song was performed by Banks during the Glastonbury Festival in June 2013.

== Background and release ==
"Yung Rapunxel" was originally set to be released on March 26, 2013. However, on March 28, 2013, it was announced that the single would drop on April 16, 2013. The first single from Broke With Expensive Taste was initially planned to be "Miss Amor/Miss Camaraderie". Nevertheless, on January 28, 2013, Banks acknowledged that the first single was going to be "Yung Rapunxel". The original release date, which was the February 12, was delayed to March, and then again, delayed to April 16, 2013. On March 9, the artwork for the single was released via Banks' Twitter account.

Michael Depland from MTV Buzzworthy described "Yung Rapunxel" as a 1990s Hi-NRG-influenced hip house song, which is built on a busy witch hop beat. Meanwhile, The Guardian's Alex Macpherson detailed the track as an industrial number. The title comes from the alter-ego of the singer based on the character Rapunzel.

== Critical reception ==
"Yung Rapunxel"
A 22-second sample of "Yung Rapunxel", a hip house and industrial song over a witch hop beat.

Spin's Marc Hogan wrote that the song "comes across as a reinvention for her, though it doesn't have quite [212's] instantly memorable catchphrases... [That] Finally, Banks has left seapunk behind to go where she belonged all along: another galaxy". MTV's Michael Depland believed that on the track, "A bona fide hip-house banger, Azealia rhymes slickly (and NSFW-ly) over a busy witch-hop beat", that Banks is "back spitting fire over a manic '90s HI-NRG-influenced track, which is cut in between muffled hollers".

== Music video ==
Shooting for the music video began on February 22, 2013, and was continued into March. The official music video was released on April 16, 2013. The video was created by visual artist Jam Sutton. The video features a mostly black-and-white setting, including police running through mist, owls with yellow and red eyes flying in suspended motion, Banks riding a mechanical bull, a rotating Yin & Yang symbol, a disembodied hand with an eye embedded in the palm floating in mid air and Banks with mouths for eyes.

== Charts ==
Chart (2013)	Peak position
Australia Urban (ARIA)	25
UK Hip Hop/R&B (OCC)	30
UK Singles (OCC)	152

== Release history ==
Region	Date	Format	Label
Canada	April 16, 2013	Digital download	Polydor
United States	April 16, 2013	Digital download	Interscope
