= Liquorice (song) =

Single by Azealia Banks

from the EP 1991
- Released: June 14, 2012
- Recorded: 2011
- Genre: Acid house
- Length: 3:16
- Label: Interscope; Polydor
- Songwriters: Azealia Banks; Matt Cutler
- Producer: Lone

Azealia Banks singles chronology
"212" (2011)	"Liquorice" (2012)	"Yung Rapunxel" (2013)

"Liquorice" is a song by American rapper Azealia Banks, taken from her debut extended play (EP) titled 1991 (2012). The song was released onto Banks' Tumblr account on December 18, 2011, and was later released for digital download on December 4, 2012. Built around Lone's song "Pineapple Crush", "Liquorice" is an acid house track that incorporates synthesizers in its composition. Lyrically, the song contains wordplay from Harlem, Banks' origin, and is inspired by interracial dating. A music video for the single was directed by Rankin and was released in June 2012.

"Liquorice" received mostly positive reviews from music critics, who praised the use of "Pineapple Crush" on the song and deemed it catchy. The single charted at number 73 on the Flemish Ultratip of Belgium in July 2012. In support of the song and 1991, Banks included "Liquorice" on the set list for her Mermaid Ball tour and performed the song at BBC's Radio 1's Hackney Weekend in 2012 and the 2013 Glastonbury Festival.

== Composition ==
"Liquorice"
A 19-second sample of "Liquorice", an acid house song

"Liquorice" was described as an acid house track by Dart Chris from Exclaim! magazine. The song is built around "Pineapple Crush", a house song produced by British electronic musician Lone, who also produced "Liquorice". The track features synthesizers in its instrumentation. Michael Cragg from The Guardian described Banks' vocals on the track as "playfully aggressive, featherlight and brilliantly smutty." According to Banks, the song was partly inspired by American producer Diplo.

Lyrically, "Liquorice" contains "Harlem-street-slang-derived wordplay", which comes from Banks' origin, Harlem (for example: "skrilla" means "money", and "ye" stands for "cocaine"). The song is also inspired by interracial dating; Banks explained: "I date lots of white guys. It's still seen as slightly taboo in African American culture, but I thought, 'Let me put this in your face and tell it how it is.'"

== Release and reception ==
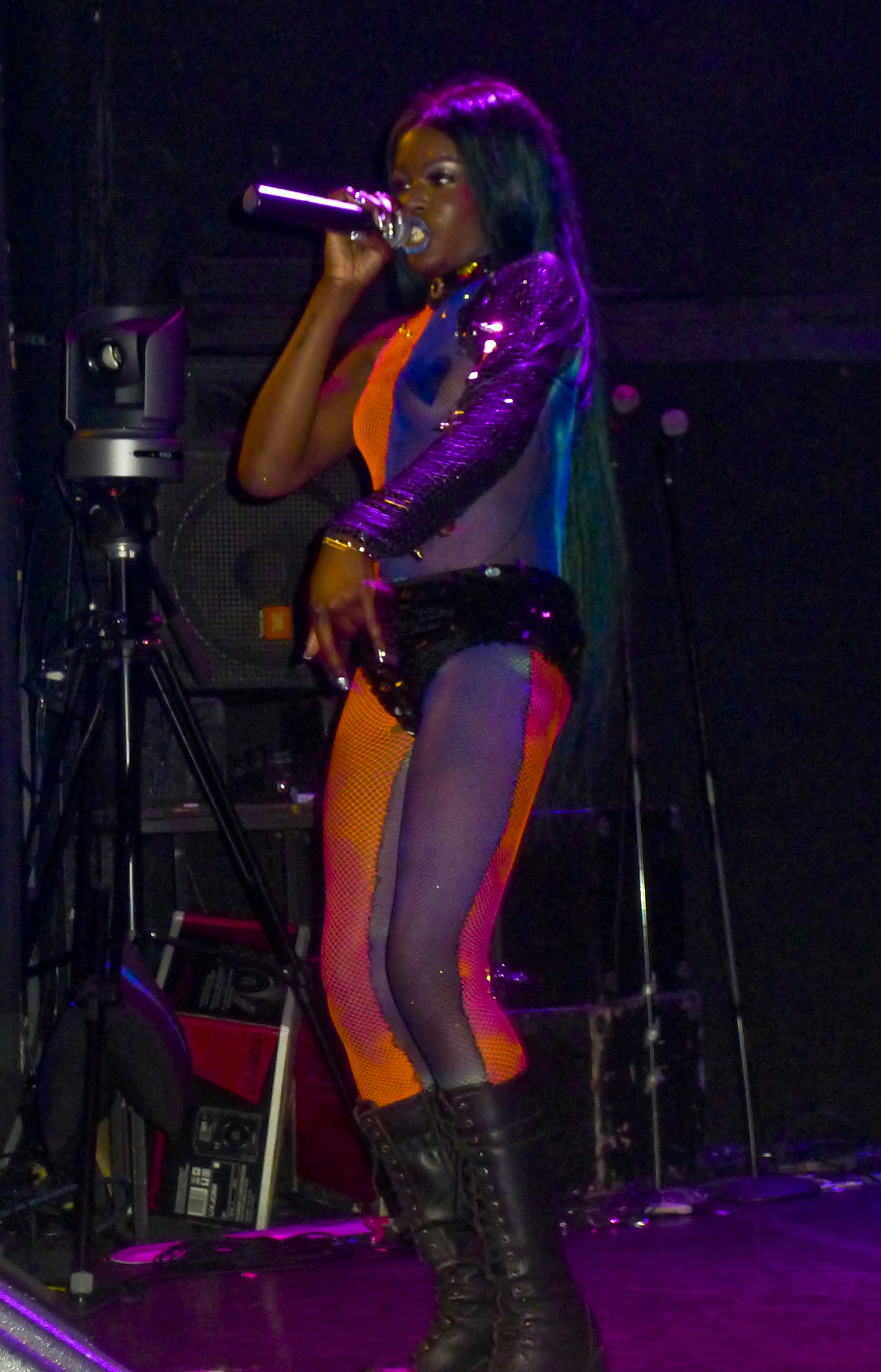
Banks performing on her Mermaid Ball tour in New York

Banks posted "Liquorice" onto her Tumblr on December 18, 2011. It was released as a digital download single on December 4, 2012. The single debuted at number 73 on the Flemish Ultratip chart of Belgium on July 7, 2012.

Dan Weiss from Boston Phoenix named "Liquorice" a "genuinely 1991-sounding" song, while Sarah Murphy from Exclaim! deemed it "undeniably catchy."

Larry Fitzmaurice of Pitchfork Media named "Liquorice" the "Best New Track" following its release; he praised the use of "Pineapple Crush" on the song, commenting: "Lone's bright tones and winding sense of melody meshes well with Banks' light, airy vocals, while Azealia spits quick over 'Pineapple Crush''s breakbeat rhythmic pattern without losing a handle on the beat, unleashing clever rhymes [...] without breaking a sweat." In a mixed review, Alex Macpherson from Fact wrote that Banks "feels slightly overwhelmed by its broad synth brushstrokes."

== Music video ==
The music video for "Liquorice" was released on June 14, 2012. The video was directed by Rankin and styled by Nicola Formichetti. The visual sees Banks as a cowgirl riding through the desert on horseback. Becky Bain from Idolator wrote: "Azealia sports bull horns, wields a baseball bat, seductively licks a Popsicle and takes a mouthful of a hot dog." Robin Murray from Clash deemed the video for the song "lavish."

== Live performances ==
In June 2012, Banks included "Liquorice" on the set list for her first headlining concert tour, Mermaid Ball, in support of 1991 and Banks' mixtape Fantasea. On June 24, 2012, Banks performed "Liquorice" at Radio 1's Hackney Weekend. The song was also included on Banks' set list at Glastonbury Festival 2013.

== Track listing ==
Digital download

1. "Liquorice" – 3:16

== Charts ==
Chart (2012)	Peak position
Belgium (Ultratip Bubbling Under Flanders)	73
