= The Big Big Beat =

Single by Azealia Banks

from the album Slay-Z
- Released: February 19, 2016
- Recorded: 2015
- Genre: Hip house
- Length: 3:36
- Label: Self-released
- Songwriters: Azealia Banks; Jonathan Harris; Jack Fuller; An Expresso
- Producer: An Expresso

Azealia Banks singles chronology
"Ice Princess" (2015)	"The Big Big Beat" (2016)	"Chi Chi" (2017)

Music video
- "The Big Big Beat" on YouTube

"The Big Big Beat" is a song recorded by American rapper Azealia Banks for her second mixtape, Slay-Z (2016). It was released as the lead single from the mixtape on February 19, 2016, after Banks had announced the mixtape in the previous May. Production of the song was handled by new producer An Expresso, while the song was penned by Banks alone. The song contains an uncredited sample of the Notorious B.I.G.'s voice. Lyrically, the track explores the importance of staying grounded and true to one's roots after achieving fame.

Several critics highlighted the "club-ready" spirit of the composition and the "catchy" lyrics. A music video for the single was released on April 26, 2016 and features the rapper dancing in a hallway of a downtown skyscraper, on the top of a police vehicle, and at the entrance to Manhattan Criminal Courts Building.

== Background ==
In May 2015, Banks announced on Twitter that she had recorded an entire mixtape of Jay Z covers and remixes, titled Slay-Z, and that she was contemplating releasing it. In August 2015, Banks revealed that due to contractual agreements, she was blocked from releasing any new music until her contract had expired, which would be around March 2016. On February 1, 2016, Banks announced that she would be releasing the aforementioned mixtape, and its lead single "The Big Big Beat" would be released on February 7. The announcement of new music came during a flurry of tweets Banks sent in which she endorsed Donald Trump and his campaign for presidency, which some critics saw as a cheap way of gaining publicity, with Spectrum writer Kerry Cardoza calling it "purely coincidental" that Banks endorsed Trump on the same days as announcing her new single. On February 8, Banks uploaded the single's artwork to Twitter. The following day, it was reported that the single had been pushed back. Banks uploaded the song to her SoundCloud account on February 19, self-releasing the single. On May 6, it was released on iTunes.

== Composition ==
'The Big Big Beat' returns Banks to the environment where she thrives, namely a throwback hip-house groove. She floats here, skittering between hard as nails raps and bubbly hooks over what sounds like a flayed sample of Biggie.

— Craig Jenkins from Noisey on "The Big Big Beat".

"The Big Big Beat" is a house song which runs for a duration of three minutes and forty-four seconds, and contains an uncredited sample of the Notorious B.I.G.'s voice. Before the release of the song, Banks described the single as giving "Detroit house vibes with major Diana Ross teas[e]". Entertainment Weekly's Dylan Kickham compared the song to that of Banks' work on her debut album, in the sense that both contain "fast, aggressive rap verses over a dancefloor-ready electronic beat and a sing-song bridge", although did not clarify whether this was good or bad. Gregory Adams from Exclaim! thought that the track "fit with various early '90s house sounds, from club synths to a jazzed-up digi-hi-hat beat", and went on to describe the song's lyrics as "maintaining the precarious balance between staying true to the streets while popping up on magazine covers". D-Money from Soul Bounce was enthusiastic in his review, writing "'The Big Big Beat' comes out of the gate swinging with a fat, squelchy synth bass intro and a vocal sample. 'Guess who up in this b***h,' Azealia begins, bringing the swing of programmed drums and hi-hats along with her as the groove kicks up the bpm and the party really gets started. She continues flipping her usual boastful rhymes that hit as hard as the kick drum thumps, then things smooth out just a bit as AB flexes her vocals on the chorus". Ione Gamble of Dazed noted Banks' use of softer vocals on the single, compared to that of her previous work, while Brennan Carley of Spin described the song's instrumental work as "glittery synthesizers", alluding that Banks had returned "swinging and vogueing" on the song.

== Critical reception ==
In a multi-person review conducted by PopMatters, opinions on the track were mixed. Each of the five reviewers gave the single a rating out of ten, which ranged from five to eight. Pryor Stroud gave the song its highest score, describing "The Big Big Beat" as an "amphetamine-addled, dance-pop flirtation that forgoes innuendo and gets straight to the point". Chad Miller commented that the song deserved endless dance remixes, while Emmanuel Elone described the song as "nice" with "decent lyrics". Steve Horowitz gave the track the lowest rating of the reviewers, complaining that the track repeated itself and that while the instrumental was suited to the dance floor, he could easily find bigger beats elsewhere.

Writing for HotNewHipHop, Rose Lilah observed that despite the fact that Banks tends to be outrageous on social media, she still has the ability to create great music when she wants to, going on to comment that she can see potential for the song to become as big of a hit as her debut single, "212". Spin writer Brennan Carley praised Banks' vocals on the track, as did Billboard critic Adelle Platon, who donned the track as a "dancefloor-ready jam". Emma Arnold, a writer for Acclaim, motioned that the track would "make you forget she was ever out of the game", going on to highlight and compliment her "fast-paced flow and thugged out lyrics". XXL critic Emmanuel C.M. lauded the song, describing the song as "fire", and that it showcased Banks' rapid fire delivery and impressive vocal range. Writing for Fuse, Tyler Lauletta commented that the lyrics of the song are "ridiculously catchy lines", calling the track "dance-ready". The Line of Best Fit writer Laurence Day wrote that the combination of contrasting genres worked to great effect, calling the track her "most promising offering in quite some time".

Both The Irish Times and USA Today included "The Big Big Beat" in weekly lists of the best songs released in the seven preceding days. The Irish Times gave the track four stars out of a possible five, commenting that it was Banks "at her best", while USA Today placed the song as sixth in their weekly list, comparing it to "Good Vibrations" by Marky Mark and the Funky Bunch. Eric Torres of Pitchfork Media named the song "Best New Track" in their review, describing the song as "in-your-face impressive, filled with the kind of lush braggadocio the 24-year-old rapper has cut down to a formula". Torres then claimed that the song was "the type of track that's capable of filling dancefloors in seconds, proof that a cavalcade of controversy isn't nearly enough to squander real talent".

== Live performances ==
Banks performed the song during her 2016 "SLAY-Z" tour. She performed the song for the first time on television on Good Day New York on August 22, 2017.

== Release history ==
Country	Date	Format	Label	Ref.
Worldwide	February 19, 2016	Streaming	Azealia Banks	
Worldwide	May 6, 2016	Digital download	Azealia Banks	
