= Heavy Metal and Reflective =

Single by Azealia Banks

from the album Broke with Expensive Taste
- Released: July 28, 2014
- Recorded: 2012
- Genre: Trap
- Length: 2:30
- Label: Azealia Banks
- Songwriters: Banks; James Strife; Julian Wodsworth
- Producer: Lil Internet

Azealia Banks singles chronology
"Yung Rapunxel" (2013)	"Heavy Metal and Reflective" (2014)	"Chasing Time" (2014)

Music video
- "Heavy Metal and Reflective" on YouTube

"Heavy Metal and Reflective" is a song recorded by American rapper Azealia Banks for her debut studio album Broke with Expensive Taste (2014). It was released as the second single from the album on July 28, 2014. Production of the song was handled by Lil Internet, who previously worked with Banks on her 2013 single "Yung Rapunxel", while writing came from Banks and James Strife. The track received generally mixed reviews from critics, who complimented the song's overall sound, but were critical of Banks' vocals. To promote "Heavy Metal and Reflective", Banks released a music video for the song on August 5, 2014, directed by Rob Soucy and Nick Ace, in which Banks escapes from being kidnapped and left in the desert, before leading a motorcycle gang through the terrain, arming herself with pit bulls.

== Background ==
In 2011, it was reported that Banks was working on her debut studio album with British producer Paul Epworth, despite not being signed to a record label at the time. In January 2012, Banks signed a deal with Interscope and Polydor Records to work on new music, and a month later, she announced the title of the album to be Broke with Expensive Taste. "Heavy Metal and Reflective" was first announced in September 2013, when Banks posted the track listing of the album to her Instagram account. Approximately a year later, she handed a complete version of the album in to the labels. Banks initially thought it would receive favorable reception from the labels; however, the representatives told Banks that she had not recorded a "hit" single for the album. Ultimately, Banks ended the record deal with Interscope and Polydor in July 2014. "Heavy Metal and Reflective" was the first post-Interscope / Polydor track that Banks released, under her own new label, Azealia Banks Records. She later approached Jeff Kwatinetz and signed a contract with his company, Prospect Park, which ultimately led to the long-awaited release of Broke with Expensive Taste on November 7, 2014.

Throughout December 2014, Banks released a series of videos in which she gave a track-by-track commentary for all of the songs from Broke with Expensive Taste, and revealed how each song came to be, dubbed the '16 Days of Azealia'. During the commentary video for "Heavy Metal and Reflective", Banks revealed that the song was created during a four-day studio session based in London, in which she was with the track's producer, Lil Internet, as well as Machinedrum and her friends. She talked about how Lil Internet was "off in this other area", segregated from the rest of the group, for two days. He then emerged from his segregated space on the second day in the studio, with the instrumental for the track. Banks described her initial reaction to the song's production as "holy shit, this is crazy", and that the beat reminded her of past works of DMX, Ruff Ryders and Swizz Beatz. She also revealed that the track was originally titled "Street Angel".

== Composition ==
A deep, tribal backing is the driving beat behind "Heavy Metal And Reflective," which also features plenty of handclaps and synth elements to make this song feel like a modern banger. The infectious, driving beat beside, Banks' smoky, husky raps work perfectly with the low song, giving out haunting, dark vibes that fit perfectly with her personality.

— Carolyn Menyes from Music Times discussing "Heavy Metal and Reflective"

"Heavy Metal and Reflective" is a song that runs for a duration of two minutes and thirty seconds. The track was produced by Lil Internet, who previously worked with Banks on her 2013 single "Yung Rapunxel". Kevipod from Direct Lyrics described the song's instrumental as "a hard-hitting, menacing beat courtesy of Lil Internet". Chris Coplan from Consequence of Sound commented that the song possessed a "combo of throbbing bass and sweat-soaked synths". Iyana Robertson, writing for Vibe, described the song's instrumental as a "a high-energy, twerk-yielding backdrop", going on to describe Banks' rapping in the song "[Banks] employs a complementing monotone to wield her sexual prowess".

== Reception ==
The track received generally mixed reviews from critics. BET writer Dominique Zonyeé spoke on the track, calling it a "high energy, boastful song in which Azealia struts her stuff while reminding you that competitors have nothing on her". Chris Coplan from Consequence of Sound thought that the song had "the potential to a true club banger". Vanyaland writer Michael Marotta described the track as "brooding and menacing", going on to describe Banks' delivery, "Banks slices through her verses in a way that recalls the magic she first flashed on the still-lethal 2011 track '212'". In a positive review, Chris Thomas from HipHopWired complimented the track, writing "The Harlem native waxes poetics with a dexterous flow. Her rhymes are laden with braggadocios lines about her boss status". In a mixed review, Kevipod from Direct Lyrics complimented the song's instrumental, but was critical of Banks' vocals, writing "'Heavy Metal and Reflective' possesses a hard-hitting, menacing beat courtesy of Lil Internet and a lot of stale rapping by Azealia", while also commenting on the need for a more mainstream song from Banks' "if she really wants to put her career together again". Robbie Daw from Idolator gave the track a negative review, describing the song as "trap-lite trash", recommending that Banks spends more time "actually focus[ing] on not making shit music".

Commercially, the single achieved minor success in the UK. The song peaked at number 40 on the UK Indie Chart, and number 10 on the UK Indie Breakers Chart.

== Promotion ==
=== Music video ===
Banks initially announced the track's release via a tweet of a video still from the song's music video, on July 18, 2014. In the still, Banks was seen standing under the sun, sporting a black jumpsuit adorned with flames on the chest and matching 3D flames on the sleeve. Critics called the release date bold, as the video was scheduled to drop a mere twenty-four hours after that of rapper Nicki Minaj's "Anaconda". The music video was released on August 5, 2014, and was directed by Rob Soucy and Nick Ace. In the video, Banks escapes from being kidnapped and left in the desert, before leading a motorcycle gang through the terrain, arming herself with pit bulls.

=== Live performances ===
On April 10, 2015, Banks performed "Heavy Metal and Reflective" during her set at the Coachella Festival. Rap-Up commented that the audience's "energy was consistently high" during the performance.

== Track listing ==
Digital download
No.	Title	Length
1.	"Heavy Metal and Reflective" (explicit)	2:30
2.	"Heavy Metal and Reflective" (clean)	2:30

== Credits and personnel ==
Credits adapted from Broke with Expensive Taste liner notes.

Locations

- Recorded at Music Box Studios (London, UK)
- Mixed at The Fortress of Amplitude studios (Los Angeles, California)

Personnel

- Vocals – Azealia Banks
- Songwriting – Azealia Banks, James Strife, Julian Wodsworth
- Production – Lil Internet
- Engineering – Rick McRae
- Recording – Rick McRae
- Mixing – Rob Kinelski
- Mixing assistant – David Baker

== Charts ==
Chart (2014)	Peak position
UK Indie (Official Charts)	40
UK Indie Breakers (Official Charts Company)	10

== Release history ==
Region	Date	Format	Label	Ref.
Worldwide	July 28, 2014	Digital download	Azealia Banks Records	
