= Ice Princess (song) =

Single by Azealia Banks

from the album Broke with Expensive Taste
- Released: March 23, 2015
- Recorded: 2012
- Genre: Trap; EDM
- Length: 3:43
- Label: Azealia Banks; Prospect Park
- Songwriters: Banks; Kevin James; Jonathan Harris
- Producer: AraabMuzik

Azealia Banks singles chronology
| "Chasing Time" (2014) | "Ice Princess" (2015) | "The Big Big Beat" (2016) |

Music video
- "Ice Princess" on YouTube

"Ice Princess" is a song recorded by American rapper Azealia Banks for her debut studio album Broke with Expensive Taste (2014). It was released as the fourth single from the album on March 23, 2015. Production of the song was handled by AraabMuzik, while it was written by Banks, Kevin James, and Jonathan Harris. "Ice Princess" contains a sample of "In the Air", originally produced by progressive house DJ Morgan Page. Lyrically, Banks brags about her wealth, with Jordan Sargent of Pitchfork Media describing it as Banks "spitting knotty rhymes about her diamonds". "Ice Princess" garnered praise from music critics, with one describing the song as "Banks at her best". To promote the song, an accompanying music video for the track was released on March 31, 2015. It features Banks ruling over a kingdom of ice warriors, flying through the sky destroying anything colorful while turning everything into ice.

== Background ==
"Ice Princess"
A 22-second sample of "Ice Princess"' chorus, where Banks raps over a sample of Morgan Page's song "In the Air".

In 2011, it was reported that Banks was working on a studio album with British producer Paul Epworth despite not having signed to a record label at that time. In January 2012, Banks signed a record deal with Interscope and Polydor Records to work on new music, and a month later, she announced the title of the album–Broke with Expensive Taste. Approximately a year later, she handed a complete version of Broke with Expensive Taste in to the labels. Banks initially thought it would receive favorable reception from the labels; however, the representatives told Banks that she had not recorded a "hit" single for the album. Ultimately, Banks ended the record deal with Interscope/Polydor in July 2014. She later approached Jeff Kwatinetz and signed a contract with his company, Prospect Park. Banks eventually released the album on November 7, 2014.

== Reception ==
"Ice Princess" received positive reviews from critics. Pitchfork named it their "Best New Track"; Jordan Sargent commented that it displayed "Banks at her best: doing something unexpected simply because she can." Brennan Carley of Spin described the song as potentially "the single that finally breaks the Harlem MC on the radio, and it's about time."

== Promotion ==
=== Music video ===
The video for "Ice Princess" was directed by duo WeWereMonkeys. It was released on March 31, 2015, via Banks' Vevo channel. The video depicts Banks as the frozen leader of a robotic ninja army, with snakes for hair, in the style of Greek mythology's Medusa. She leads her CGI army into battle with a volcano that produces multicolored clouds, that eventually end up destroying her. Reviews of the video were positive. Kate Beaudoin of Mic called the video "epic", and according to James Rettig from Stereogum, it's a "slick" music video. Banks initially caused controversy with promotion for the song, posting pictures of her in makeup for the video, claiming she was in whiteface, which caused outrage on the internet. However, Banks ultimately revealed that she was trolling the media, and the makeup was not finished, being applied for the music video for "Ice Princess". She later tweeted "Lol u crackers wish I cared enough to be doing whiteface. I'm becoming the ICE PRINCESS YAAAAAAS".

=== Live performances ===
On April 10, 2015, Banks performed "Ice Princess" at the Coachella Festival. On July 10, 2015, she performed it during her set at the Bilbao BBK Live festival in Bilbao, Spain.

== Credits and personnel ==
Credits adapted from Broke with Expensive Taste liner notes.

=== Credits ===
"Ice Princess" contains a sample of "In the Air", a song by progressive house DJ Morgan Page.

=== Personnel ===
- Azealia Banks – songwriting, vocals
- Kevin James – songwriting
- Jonathan Harris – songwriting
- AraabMuzik – production

== Release history ==
| Country | Date | Format | Label | Ref. |
|---|---|---|---|---|
| Worldwide | March 23, 2015 | Digital download | Azealia Banks; Caroline; Prospect Park | |
