= ATM Jam =

Promotional single by Azealia Banks featuring Pharrell
- Released: August 30, 2013
- Recorded: 2013
- Genre: Hip hop
- Length: 3:53
- Label: Interscope; Polydor
- Songwriters: Azealia Banks; Jonathan Harris; Pharrell Williams
- Producer: Pharrell Williams

Music video
- "ATM Jam" on YouTube

Remix video
- "ATM Jam" (Kaytranada remix) on YouTube

"ATM Jam" is a song by American rapper Azealia Banks featuring vocals and sole production from American musician Pharrell Williams. The track was released in 2013, originally serving as the second single from Banks' debut studio album, Broke with Expensive Taste (2014). The track debuted on June 29, 2013, as part of the rapper's set at Glastonbury Festival 2013, with New York radio station Hot 97 premiering the clean, shortened version of the studio recording three days later on July 2. On July 11, 2013, the full studio version of "ATM Jam" was officially released for radio airplay on BBC Radio 1. On November 9, 2013, Azealia tweeted that she would be taking "ATM Jam" off the album and that the song was meant to be a "passing chapter" and not a single.

== Background ==
During an interview with BBC Radio 1 DJ Zane Lowe—which was broadcast on July 16, 2013—Banks revealed that "ATM Jam" was originally meant for singer Beyoncé. Explaining how the track then came to be recorded by herself, Banks commented, "She wanted to rap or something and wanted me to write a song, and I could't come up with anything that I thought would be appropriate for her just because I'm so raunchy, but I wrote the song. I wrote like some verses on it and Pharrell was just like 'you should just keep it'".

In a 2017 interview with XXL Magazine, four years after the song's release, Banks discussed her disappointment with the single and its surrounding release. Banks stated that the track was originally a leftover Pharrell sent to late rapper Mac Miller and that her record label, Polydor Records, pushed for the song's release, despite Banks wanting to release "Miss Amor" as the first single from Broke with Expensive Taste. Banks also expressed her frustration at collaborator Pharrell and his lack of promotion regarding the single and further stated that after "ATM Jam" was released, "everything fell apart". Consequently, Banks later exited her record deal with Polydor.

== Critical reception ==
"ATM Jam" received mixed reviews from critics. In a positive review of the single, Josiah Hughes of Exclaim! complimented Banks' collaboration with Pharrell Williams, stating that the two sounded "remarkably good together." Chris Martins of Spin favorably compared Banks' performance to that of fellow rappers Nicki Minaj and Missy Elliott, noting her "crisp delivery and occasional foray into the English accent." In addition, Jordan Sargent of the same publication called "ATM Jam" Banks' "best shot at pop relevancy in the States." In a negative review of the single, Fact criticized Pharrell's performance, calling the hook "flaccid" and stating that, "overall, no one sounds that excited to be on the track."

== Music video ==
Banks originally announced that the video for "ATM Jam" was shot in New York City on July 29, 2013, with director Clarence Fuller. However, the video with Fuller was later scrapped for unknown reasons and re-shot with director Rony Alwin, premiering on October 21, 2013.

== Charts ==
Chart (2013)	Peak position
Belgium (Ultratip Bubbling Under Flanders)	55
Belgium (Ultratop Flanders Urban)	37
UK Singles (Official Charts Company)	169

== Release history ==
Region	Date	Format(s)
Australia	August 30, 2013	Digital download
Finland	August 30, 2013	Digital download
Germany	August 30, 2013	Digital download
United States	September 3, 2013	Digital download
United Kingdom	September 27, 2013	Digital download
