= Afrodeutsche =

English composer, producer and DJ

Henrietta Smith-Rolla
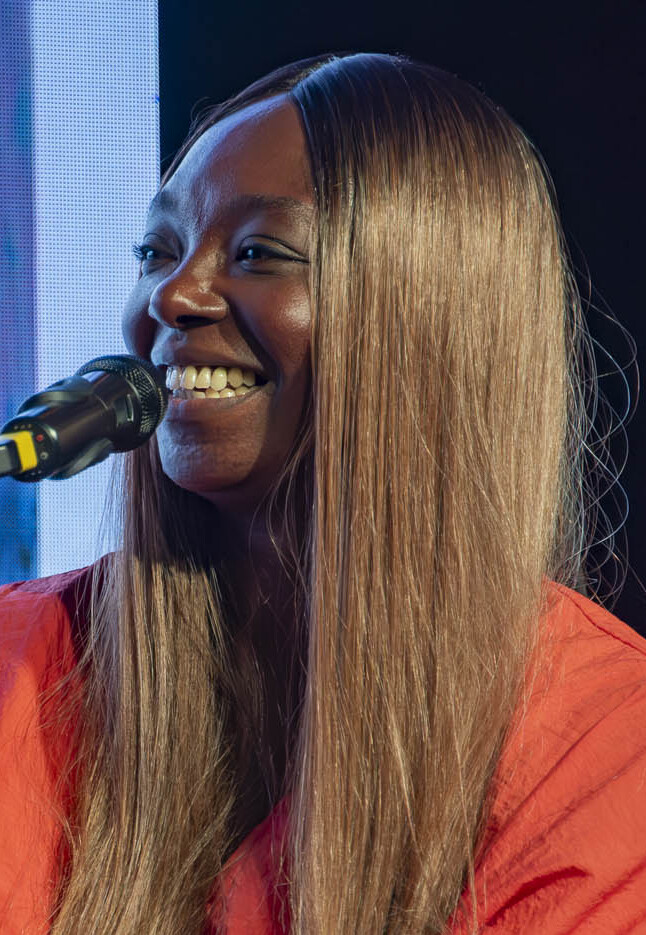
- Henrietta Smith-Rolla (Afrodeutsche) in 2025

Background information
- Also known as: Afrodeutsche
- Genres: Electronic, Contemporary Classical
- Occupations: Producer; Composer; Performer; DJ
- Years active: 2007–present
- Labels: Skam Records, River Rapid, SA Recordings

Henrietta Smith-Rolla (born 7 February 1980/81) is an English composer, producer and DJ based in Manchester, performing under the alias Afrodeutsche. Alongside her prolific DJ career, she has produced music for her own studio album, as well as music for television and film, including composing the score for BAFTA nominated short film Kamali.

== History ==
Growing up in the south west of England, She is of Ghanaian, Russian and German descent. Smith-Rolla developed an affinity for music at a young age. When she was seven, she would dance along to hits on Top of the Pops and Nikolai Rimsky-Korsakov’s Flight of the Bumblebee. At nine, she was introduced to the West Country free party scene through an older friend who would bring back cassettes for her to listen to on her Walkman. She soon started to take formal violin lessons, but gave up by age 12, instead opting to spend many hours playing the pianos of the houses her mother was cleaning.

Smith-Rolla briefly lived in London before moving to Manchester at age 24. Feeling a strong connection with the city, she describes it as “nurturing without question”, and gave her “complete freedom to make stuff”.

Despite not knowing how to read music at the time, Smith-Rolla was invited to join Graham Massey’s Sisters of Transistors in 2006, a vintage organ group playing a combination of original music and covers of compositions by the likes of Rachmaninoff. The music was geared towards a Baroque style with an electronic twist. Smith-Rolla has since been involved in several other musical collaborations with Graham Massey, including the Toolshed collective and The Part Time Heliocentric Cosmo Drama After School Club, originally formed as a tribute to the late Sun Ra, as well as synth pop group Silverclub, releasing music on Red Laser Records.

Smith-Rolla started to formally make electronic music in 2007, after being introduced to Underground Resistance’s Afrogermanic by friends. In 2009, she started club night Clap Trap with friend Jackie Thompson and that same year she began composing for other people, mostly writing film and theatre scores, taking inspiration from Bernard Hermann’s work for Alfred Hitchcock.

The Afrodeutsche project was started in 2016, growing from a search for Smith-Rolla’s biological father, in which she discovered her Ghanaian roots also included German and Russian heritage. Of the name, translating as African-German, she has said “I just had this huge connection to it straight away. I never expected to realise myself artistically in this world.”

In 2018, Smith-Rolla's debut album, Break Before Make, was released on Skam, a mainstay of Manchester’s electronic scene since 1990. A mixture of electro-futurism and Detroit legacy house, it has been described by Juno Records as “undeniably impressive” and a “killer debut” by Bleep.

This was soon followed in 2019 with the release of an EP, RR001, marking the first release on new record label River Rapid, founded by Scottish DJ Eclair Fifi. Its zappy synths and snake-charming basslines prompted Resident Advisor to recognise Afrodeutsche as "a promising newcomer".

Smith-Rolla was invited to attend a five day residency at Brighter Sound with Beth Orton in March 2019, sharing her creative processes with seven local female artists.

Later in 2019, Smith-Rolla composed the score for Kamali, Sasha Rainbow's short film about a young skateboarder in India, receiving a BAFTA nomination for Best Short Film and qualifying for the 2020 Oscars shortlist. For the soundtrack, Smith-Rolla focused on the piano to create its six minimalist tracks, praised for their poignancy and sensitivity. It was later released on SA Recordings in 2020, complemented by her own sample library on Spitfire Audio called Spectrum based on the soundtrack. On composing for film, Smith-Rolla has said “I’ve always had a real love for film and scoring – making sense of visual images with sound.”

In April 2021, a selection of Smith-Rolla's compositions were performed in Four Women: The Untold Orchestra, a unique cultural showcase exploring the experiences of black women within the creative industries and society at large, based on the narrative of Nina Simone's Four Women and led by prominent black female artists including fellow Mancunian DJ Paulette. The event also featured music written by composers Errollyn Wallen, Jessie Montgomery and Daniel Bernard Roumain.

In August 2021, Smith-Rolla composed a commission for London Contemporary Orchestra. Robert Ames orchestrated and conducted the world premiere along with vocal ensemble Voces8. On working with Ames, Smith-Rolla has said: “I’ve been very blessed… he was orchestrating my work as well as conducting, so there was this connection with the orchestra that was innate, that I couldn’t have engineered.”

Later that year, Smith-Rolla collaborated with researcher and PhD student Alex Jovčić-Sas on a project exploring Gertrud Grunow and Daphne Oram’s unique contributions to optical sound theory through archival material, the loan of a Mini-Oramics Machine (an image-based sound generator designed by Oram) and modern compositional tools. This project came into fruition in October 2021, with a commissioned live performance at the Nottingham Contemporary which featured choreography and dance from Martin Tomplinson.

Smith-Rolla performed at the Southbank Centre’s QEH in October 2021 for another world premiere of one of her compositions, 'Promises', alongside the BBC Concert Orchestra and fellow producers Daniel Avery and Aïsha Devi. She was commissioned by Elizabeth Alker and the BBC CO for BBC Radio 3's Unclassified programme.

Smith-Rolla's sound is most heavily influenced by Drexciya, Dopplereffekt, Underground Resistance and Aux 88, as well as a variety of film composers.

In addition to musical composition, Smith-Rolla is a prolific DJ, having toured throughout Europe and performed at Dekmantel, Sónar Barcelona, Dimensions, and Berghain alongside artists such as Aphex Twin and Dopplereffekt. She also hosts a quarterly radio show on NTS called Black Forest, broadcasting an eclectic selection of electro and techno music. Since 2021 she has been a regular presenter on BBC Radio 6 Music., with a regular weekend programme from 2026.

== Discography ==
- Break Before Make (2018, Skam)
- Advent 18 (2018, compilation album released by LuckyMe)
- RR001 (2019, River Rapid)
- Kamali (2020, SA Recordings)
