= Chimes (song) =

- Remix version cover

Single by Hudson Mohawke

from the album Chimes
- Released: 22 July 2014
- Recorded: 2012–14
- Genre: Trap; electronica
- Length: 3:33 (album version); 3:12 (remix version)
- Label: Warp
- Songwriter: Ross Matthew Birchard

"Chimes" is a song by Scottish artist and producer Hudson Mohawke. The song gained attention after its appearance on the MacBook Air TV ad, as well as after Mohawke's success through the likes of Kanye West and with the TNGHT project.

On 21 November an official remix of the song, featuring rappers Pusha T, Future, Travis Scott and French Montana, was released as a single. The track was featured on a television advertisement called "Stickers" for the Apple MacBook Air.

== Background ==
The track was originally believed to be a collaboration with Canadian producer Lunice. TNGHT first premiered the unfinished version of the track during BBC Radio 1Xtra's Diplo & Friends in late 2012, a time which he said was before the EDM-trap trend. "That sound wasn't as prevalent then, and I just sort of made it... it wasn't really meant to be anything," he stated.

After the duo went on hiatus in late 2013.

== Composition ==
In contrast to its title, according to The Guardian, "there isn’t much that’s peaceful about [the song]."

The "ominous" horn lines was also favorably compared to TNGHT's "Higher Ground" and Kanye West's "Blood on the Leaves", both of which Mohawke worked on.

== Critical reception ==
Writing for The Guardian, Hannah Jane Parkinson voted the song as the week's "Best New Track", stating "If the Grim Reaper and Voldemort hooked up in a David Cronenberg film, this would be 'their song'."

== Remix version ==
A remix version called "Chimes RMX", which features Pusha T, Travis Scott, French Montana and Future, was released on 21 November 2014. Mohawke soon after debuted an interactive video which has similarities to Super Mario 64's menu screen where you can play with the performers' faces.

== Usage in media ==
After "Chimes" was already being mastered and going into manufacture, "by chance", Apple came along and decided that they wanted to use it for their campaign.

In late 2019, the song was featured in the trailer for The Last Dance

== Track listing ==
Digital download – remix
No.	Title	Length
1.	"Chimes (RMX)" (featuring Pusha T, Future, Travis Scott and French Montana)	3:12

== Charts ==
Chart (2014)	Peak; position
Belgium (Ultratip Bubbling Under Flanders)	84
France (SNEP)	30
UK Indie (OCC)	9
UK Indie Breakers (Official Charts Company)	1
US Dance/Electronic Digital Songs (Billboard)	12

== Chimes EP ==
Chimes

EP by Hudson Mohawke
- Released: 29 September 2014
- Recorded: 2012–14
- Genre: Trap; electronica
- Length: 11:29
- Label: Warp
- Producer: Hudson Mohawke

Hudson Mohawke chronology
Hud Mo 100 (2013)	Chimes (2014)	Lantern (2015)

Chimes is the eighth extended play by Hudson Mohawke on 29 September 2014 through Warp Records. The EP includes a 170 bpm Gammer remix of the track with UK hardcore influences, as well as two more new productions titled "Brainwave" and "King Kong Beaver".

=== Background ===
After finishing the title track, he decided to release an EP before the full-length album.

In July 2015, while debuting the title track, he also announced the release of the album on 30 September and its track list.

=== Songs ===
Described by Pitchfork, "Brainwave" is a "brooding synth" track that "haunted by soaring choir work", which reminiscent of M83. The last track from the EP was a remix of "Chimes" from DJ Gammer.

=== Critical reception ===
Professional ratings
Review scores
Source	Rating
NME	7/10
Pitchfork	6.7/10
PopMatters	5/10 stars

While Pitchfork's Jamieson Cox calling the title song the "most fleshed-out track", the other two were said to be "minor" but still do expand Mohawke's repertoire, with the EP "does a fine job of sustaining his momentum."

=== Track listing ===
All tracks are written by Ross Birchard.

No.	Title	Length
1.	"Chimes"	3:31
2.	"Brainwave"	2:17
3.	"King Kong Beaver"	2:40
4.	"Chimes" (Gammer Re-Edit)	3:03
Total length:		11:29

=== Personnel ===
Credits adapted from liner notes.

- Hudson Mohawke – production (1–3)
- Mervyn Bruge – horns (1)
- Billy Ray Cunningsnatch – vocals (2)
- Maury Ballstein – keyboards (3)
- The Kissing Bandito – handclaps (3)
- Gammer – edit (4), production (4)
- Dick Astley – horns (4)
