= TNGHT (EP) =

EP by TNGHT
- Released: July 23, 2012
- Recorded: Oxford Street, London
- Genre: Trap; electronic
- Length: 15:49
- Label: Warp; LuckyMe
- Producer: Lunice; Hudson Mohawke

TNGHT chronology
TNGHT (2012)	II (2019)

Singles from TNGHT
- 1. "Higher Ground" Released: July 18, 2012

TNGHT is the self-titled debut extended play of the duo TNGHT, the collaboration of producers Hudson Mohawke and Lunice. Recorded in a London studio in a couple of nights, it was released on the labels Warp and LuckyMe on July 23, 2012.

TNGHT received critical acclaim. It landed on numerous year-end lists of publications including Pitchfork Media. It was also on the American Billboard charts, debuting at number 180 on the Billboard 200.

== Background ==
Lunice and Hudson Mohawke first met in 2008, when Lunice asked Mohawke to perform at a show for his Turbo Crunk crew. After spending a few years focusing on their respective careers, Lunice decided to produce simpler music instead of being "all over the place, trying to push how weird I could get, but the more I continued, the more I wanted to compress and refine my style to a point of, like, 'What if I just made a song out of one snare?' It's natural: After you've been experimenting, you calm down". After hearing Mohawke's remix of Gucci Mane's "Party Animal", in which Mohawke had started doing "really simple, huge, stabbing productions", Lunice met with him to share new material he had been working on, and the two formed TNGHT.

The duo recorded their self-titled extended play in a few days at a very small studio outside of Oxford Street, London, with initially no plans for release. Mohawke described the project as "a proper click", unlike previous collaborations he had done with which he was dissatisfied because it felt "like you're compromising something of yourself in it". In 2012, the duo stated that the instrumentals on the EP were planned to include rappers: "Pretty much all the tracks on the EP are placed with MCs; most of them are gonna have MCs on them at some point, though we can't talk about who those people are at the moment".

== Composition ==
TNGHT was found by some critics to sound more representative of the solo work by Lunice. According to Beats per Minute's Chris Bosman, every song of TNGHT is modeled as, "Take a warped hook or two, bash it into the listeners skull with psychotic glee, add the explosive pyrotechnics of Southern rap beats, and then tear at the seams". Derek Staples of Consequence of Sound described TNGHT as a combination of "regional beats", future garage, and electro similar to the works of Chrissy Murderbot, machinedrum, and Orlando-based producer Big Makk. As a critic for NME wrote, "Chasm-deep 808 basslines bellow beneath spacious marching-band drum grooves, super-sharp snare rolls and quirky snatches of sound, building the tension to near-unbearable levels before collapsing into frenetic, ground-shaking drops". Fact magazine critic Tom Lea analyzed that, for most of the EP, kick and snare sounds "dominate" the drum parts, and noted "Higher Ground" to be the only song on the EP to feature the "rapid-fire hi-hats" typical in trap music. Bosman compared TNGHT to the works of GOOD Music producers Mike Dean and Swizz Beatz, also noting its bass sounds were similar to those present in songs by Hit-Boy and its rhythms resembled those by producer Polow da Don.

Popmatters reviewer David Amidon wrote that TNGHT opens "fairly safely" with "Top Floor", a song "just a few 808 snare trills and pair of ambient dubstep breakdowns away" from music produced by Mr. Bangladesh, and after that, the duo are fast to present "their adventurous side" starting with "Gooooo". "Top Floor" starts "in a bit of warped new-age territory" before quickly turning into a more bass-driven landscape with an almost Arabic-like voice sample in the mix. Tapping into the "gamer nostalgia" of Wonky music, Amidon described "Gooooo" as if "Samus Aran took a seat in the Total Recall chair and was planted in a Matrix-like goth club overseen by Shao Kahn". The instrumentation of the song consists of a "keening, 8-bit lead, chanted whoops, death-spiral snare rolls and gabber-grade super saws". Pitchfork Media reviewer Larry Fitzmaurice opined that the "tight tonal coils" on the song "sound like hot knives slashing through metal by its high-anxiety conclusion".

Carving the songs of English trio Nero "to their meatiest elements", as elements including looped handclaps and the signature synth rise of Drumma Boy are present, the bounce and juke-fused "Higher Ground" has only – or "obliterates", as Bosman puts it – two hooks, one with looped second-long female vocal samples and another with a synthesized Southern hip-hop-style "HBCU brass" popping "in and out to steamroll buildings" for humorous purposes. An AOL Instant Messenger-esque sound effect of a cooing baby and "glowing, trance-like synths" are played on "Bugg'n", which was analogized by Amidon as if "Diddy Kong got ahold of a 9MM on the honeycomb levels". TNGHT closes with "Easy Easy", a song led by a "discombobulating synth that should soundtrack an animated version of Black Swan" over samples of broken and smashed windows, looped car crash noises, and gun-cocking sounds used as percussion.

== Critical reception ==
Professional ratings
Aggregate scores
Source	Rating
Metacritic	83/100
Review scores
Source	Rating
AllMusic	4/5 stars
Beats Per Minute	86%
Consequence of Sound	4/5 stars
Fact	3.5/5
NME	9/10
Pitchfork	8.5/10
PopMatters	7/10
Resident Advisor	4/5
Spin	8/10
XLR8R	6/10

TNGHT garnered critical acclaim upon release. The EP holds an aggregated weighted mean of 83 out of 100 from Metacritic based on nine reviews, while on AnyDecentMusic?, it has an aggregate 7.8 out of ten, also a weighted average. Writing for NME, Jon Cook, scoring it a 9 out of 10, said that listeners were right in having high expectations for TNGHT, noting that songs like "Bugg'n", "Goooo", and "Easy Easy" best display the "oddball brilliance" of the EP. Amidon highlighted that, rather than "playing spot the influence with us or pointing at Atlanta groups like 1017 Brick Squad and Duct Tape Entertainment with ironic laughter", the two combined what was great about their very different styles "into a very synthetic, parasitical whole", calling the EP the year's "most unexpected – and welcome – entry into the club's current infatuation with trap rap's 808 abuse". Deviant, reviewing for Sputnikmusic, had a similar opinion, saying that while collaboration albums can normally be "tiresome affair[s]", the collaboration of Lunice and Hudson Mahawke is a "rare yet perfect duality, where we can still see what each producer has on display but when entwined together it becomes impossible to discern where one ends and the other begins". A review published in Resident Advisor called it "way more clever than your average thuggish bombast".

Some reviewers felt that the group had yet to show more of their potential than what they recorded on TNGHT. These included Larry Fitzmaurice, a critic for Pitchfork Media, who awarded TNGHT the label of "Best New Music" and called it "some of the year's most brazen, positively huge hip-hop sounds". He predicted that the two have "already yielded results so impressive and of-the-moment that it's likely we haven't heard the last of it". Lea shared a similar conclusion, predicting that all of the duo's qualities would be heard on their work with Danny Brown and a remix of a Waka Flocka Flame song. However, while he called TNGHT "big, dumb, and a lot of fun", he also wrote it felt like it was "the start of something great than a great record in itself". Deviant, stating that it "ends before it's even really begun", called it an overall "tremendous and kaleidoscopic introduction to a dream production duo that has already turned heads", but he wrote that only a small part of the duo's imagination shown at their live debut at South by Southwest is present on the record. In a more mixed review, XLR8R critic Glenn Jackson thought the EP has tracks "that are surely bound to prove useful to DJs operating in the more booming regions of 140-plus-bpm fare", but criticized it for removing Mohawke's "noted penchant for sonic adventure" in place of Lunice's "proficiency for big-system bangers", concluding that "the five tracks here result in little more than the requisite head nod for the rest of us".

== Accolades ==
Publication	Rank	Ref
Beats per Minute (EPs)	3	
Consequence of Sound	31	
Gigwise	35	
Pitchfork Media	35	

== Track listing ==
All tracks are written by Lunice Fermin Pierre II and Ross Birchard.

No.	Title	Length
1.	"Top Floor"	1:53
2.	"Goooo"	3:21
3.	"Higher Ground"	3:19
4.	"Bugg'n"	3:25
5.	"Easy Easy"	3:51
Total length:		15:49

== Charts ==
Chart (2012)	Peak position
US Billboard 200	180
US Top Dance/Electronic Albums (Billboard)	8
US Independent Albums (Billboard)	31
US Heatseekers Albums (Billboard)	3
