= Dawn Chorus (album) =

Studio album by Jacques Greene
- Released: October 18, 2019
- Genres: Electronica; house; ambient; shoegaze; future garage
- Label: LuckyMe
- Producer: Philippe Aubin-Dionne

Jacques Greene chronology
Feel Infinite (2017)	Dawn Chorus (2019)

Singles from Dawn Chorus
- 1. "Night Service" Released: June 27, 2019; 2. "Do It Without You" Released: September 19, 2019; 3. "For Love" Released: October 2, 2019; 4. "Let Go" Released: October 16, 2019

Dawn Chorus is the second studio album by Canadian electronic musician Jacques Greene. It was released on October 18, 2019 by LuckyMe.

== Critical reception ==
Professional ratings
Aggregate scores
Source	Rating
Metacritic	82/100
Review scores
Source	Rating
AllMusic	4/5 stars
Exclaim!	8/10
Pitchfork	7.7/10

Dawn Chorus was met with "universal acclaim" reviews from critics. At Metacritic, which assigns a weighted average rating out of 100 to reviews from mainstream publications, this release received an average score of 82, based on 6 reviews.

== Track listing ==
Track listing and credits adapted from Apple Music and Tidal.

No.	Title	Writer(s)	Length
1.	"Serenity"	Philippe Aubin-Dionne	3:53
2.	"Drop Location"	Aubin-Dionne; Michael Volpe; Daniel Domingo de Lara	2:49
3.	"Do It Without You"	Aubin-Dionne	3:32
4.	"Night Service"	Aubin-Dionne; Roland Pemberton	4:29
5.	"Sel"	Aubin-Dionne; Julianna Barwick; Daniel Domingo de Lara	3:16
6.	"Let Go"	Aubin-Dionne; Travis Stewart; Rochelle Jordan	4:17
7.	"For Love"	Aubin-Dionne; Willi Morrison; Ian Guenther	5:40
8.	"Sibling"	Aubin-Dionne	4:24
9.	"Whenever"	Aubin-Dionne	3:19
10.	"Understand"	Aubin-Dionne	2:50
11.	"Distance"	Aubin-Dionne; Oliver Coates; Daniel Domingo de Lara	2:44
12.	"Stars"	Aubin-Dionne; Sandrine Somé; Pemberton	6:49

Notes

- "Drop Location" features co-production from Clams Casino.
- "Night Service" features vocals by Cadence Weapon.
- "Let Go" features vocals by Rochelle Jordan and co-production from Machinedrum.
- "Stars" features vocals by Sandrine Somé and Cadence Weapon.
