= Jacques Greene =

Canadian musician (born 1989)

- Also known as: Hovatron
- Born: Philippe Aubin-Dionne; 24 September 1989 (age 37); Montreal, Canada
- Genres: Electronic; house; experimental; future garage
- Occupation: Music producer
- Instruments: Keyboards; synthesiser
- Years active: 2010–present
- Label: LuckyMe
- Website: jacquesgreene.com

Philippe Aubin-Dionne (born 24 September 1989), better known by the stage name Jacques Greene, is a Canadian electronic musician based in Toronto. He has released music on the LuckyMe and Night Slugs labels and co-owns Vase Records.

Greene released his debut album, Feel Infinite, in 2017 on LuckyMe. He has produced for vocalists Katy B, Tinashe and How to Dress Well, and has remixed Radiohead, Autre Ne Veut, Ciara, and Shlohmo.

== History ==
Greene began creating electronic music when a high school history teacher introduced him to Aphex Twin, precipitating a realization that "music doesn't have to be angry white men over a guitar." Greene and his friends would throw club parties called Turbo Crunk. From 2008 to 2011, Turbo Crunk's key players were Hadji Baraka, Ango, Seb Diamond, Lunice, and Greene.

In 2011, Greene released the single "Another Girl," which Pitchfork included in its list of "The 200 Best Tracks of the Decade So Far (2010-2014)". The magazine wrote that while this "decade has seen no shortage of dance songs that pluck vocals from R&B and warp them into unfamiliar shapes[,] 'Another Girl' emerged just before reworked deep Brandy cuts dominated SoundCloud dashboards, and it still moves with a distinctly human gait."

In October 2021, Greene released his first compilation album ANTH01 which featured early and unreleased music.

He has collaborated with Canadian designer Rad Hourani.

=== Vase Records ===
Greene is co-owner of Vase Records alongside former manager, Joe Coghill. Vase was established in 2011 and has released music by Greene, Koreless, Ango, Zodiac, Arclight, Samoyed and Gorgeous Children.

As well as musicians, Vase has signed two Montreal fashion designers.

In 2013 Greene / Vase Records curated a collaborative audio/visual event along with artists Trusst in The Tanks at Tate Modern in London, at which Greene performed.

== Discography ==
=== Albums ===
- 2017: Feel Infinite (LuckyMe)
- 2019: Dawn Chorus (LuckyMe)
- 2025: Verses GT with Nosaj Thing (LuckyMe)
- 2026: JG (LuckyMe)

=== Singles and EPs ===
- 2010: "(Baby I don't Know) What You Want" by Greene / "Broken Embrace" by Optimum (LuckyMe) – split single, sampler for Night Slugs Allstars Volume 1
- 2010: The Look EP (LuckyMe)
- 2011: "Lay It Down" (UNO)
- 2011: "Another Girl" (LuckyMe)
- 2011: Greene 01 EP (No Label)
- 2012: Concealer EP (Vase, 2012) – "Flatline" features vocals by Ango; "Arrow" features Koreless
- 2012: Ready EP (3024)
- 2013: Greene 02 EP (No Label)
- 2013: On Your Side EP (LuckyMe, 2013) – "On Your Side" features guest vocals from Tom Krell AKA How To Dress Well
- 2013: "Painted Faces" (Yours Truly, 2013) – with Tinashe. The result of a project between Yours Truly and Adidas Originals to foster collaboration on new music.
- 2014: Phantom Vibrate EP (LuckyMe)
- 2014: After Life After Party EP (LuckyMe, 2014) – includes remixes by Suicideyear and Scot Sei A.
- 2018: Fever Focus EP (LuckyMe)

=== Remixes ===
- 2011: Cassie & P. Diddy: "Must Be Love" (Jacques Greene Remix)
- 2011: Radiohead: "Lotus Flower" (Jacques Greene Remix) – released on the TKOL RMX1 12-inch vinyl single and on the TKOL RMX 1234567 compilation album
- 2012: Jesse Boykins III: "The Perfect Blues" (Jacques Greene Remix)
- 2013: Autre Ne Veut: "Play by Play" (Jacques Greene Remix)
- 2013: Ciara: "Sorry" (Jacques Greene Remix)
- 2013: Ciara: "Body Party" (Jacques Greene Remix)
- 2015: Escape: "Just Escape" (Jacques Greene Remix)
- 2015: Vaults: "Premonitions" (Jacques Greene Remix)
- 2015: Shlohmo: "Ten Days of Falling" (Jacques Greene Remix)
- 2017: Flume ft. MNDR: "Like Water" (Jacques Greene Remix)

=== Mixes ===
- 2012: Jacques Greene for TSUGI (TSUGI)

=== Compilation albums ===
- 2021: ANTH01
