= Cry Sugar =

Studio album by Hudson Mohawke
- Released: 12 August 2022
- Genre: Dance; electronic
- Length: 62:51
- Label: Warp
- Producer: Hudson Mohawke; Chad Hugo (co.); KÁRYYN (co.)

Hudson Mohawke chronology
Airborne Lard (2020)	Cry Sugar (2022)	L'Ecstasy (2023)

Singles from Cry Sugar
- 1. "Cry Sugar (Megamix) / Bicstan" Released: 29 June 2022; 2. "Stump / Dance Forever" Released: 26 July 2022

Cry Sugar is the third studio album by Hudson Mohawke, the alias of Scottish musician Ross Birchard. It was released on 12 August 2022 on Warp Records. It has received generally favorable critical reviews.

== Background ==
Cry Sugar is Birchard's first album of new material since his 2016 soundtrack for the video game Watch Dogs 2 and his first full-length solo release in the digital streaming era. In a press release, Birchard described the album as influenced by his move to Los Angeles, in which he observed its "American decadence" and compared it to the "apocalyptic film scores" of artists such as Vangelis and John Williams." Gospel and soul samples feature on much of the album, a quality rooted in Birchard's admiration for the tradition of hip-hop producers including DJ Premier, Pete Rock, and Just Blaze. Chad Hugo of the Neptunes contributed to the track "Redeem". The track "Stump" was inspired by Max Richter's "On the Nature of Daylight", heard in the soundtrack of Shutter Island (2010).

The cover artwork by Willehad Eilers depicts a debauched scene featuring Donald Duck in a thong. A music video for the single "Bicstan" was directed by Patti Harrison and Alan Resnick. Visuals for the "Megamix" and "Stump" releases were made by an artist named kingcon2k11 using a neural network.

== Critical reception ==
Professional ratings
Aggregate scores
Source	Rating
Metacritic	79/100
Review scores
Source	Rating
AllMusic	3.5/5 stars
Clash	9/10
The Guardian	4/5 stars
Pitchfork	7.3/10
Resident Advisor	positive
The Skinny	4/5 stars

At Metacritic, which assigns a weighted average score out of 100 to reviews from mainstream critics, Cry Sugar received an average score of 79, based on 7 reviews, indicating "generally favourable reviews".

Louis Torracinta of Clash suggested the album "may take the cake for dance record of the year," adding that it "pulls from everywhere, all at once, swimming in the old and celebrating ecstatically the new." David Renshaw of The Fader stated that Birchard's "love of the wildly high BPM club sound of hardcore is blended with soulful gospel samples and epic movie-score landscapes to create a project that's irreverent, yet moving and hypnotic as well." Alexis Petridis of The Guardian stated that "there's an edge-of-chaos tone to Cry Sugar, an album on which almost every sound fizzes with distortion and the music occasionally sounds on the verge of collapse." Gaby Wood of Resident Advisor called the album Birchard's "definitive solo effort" which "sees him re-emerge not as a jack but a master of all trades, fusing soul, jazz, happy hardcore and dance into vibrant, technicolor explosions of sound that succinctly capture the mood of our time in all its fitful glory and pain." Arielle Lana LeJarde of Mixmag described Cry Sugar as a "62-minute-long hallucinogenic trip into our innermost emotions through frantically introspective, groove-coaxing tunes."

"Lonely Days" was named one of Clash's top tracks of 2022.

== Track listing ==
All tracks produced by Hudson Mohawke, except "Redeem", co-produced with Chad Hugo, and "Kpipe", co-produced with KÁRYYN.

Cry Sugar track listing
No.	Title	Writer(s)	Length
1.	"Ingle Nook"	Ross Birchard; Olivier St. Louis; Johan Lenox	1:53
2.	"Intentions"	Birchard	4:18
3.	"Expo"	Birchard	0:40
4.	"Behold"	Birchard	2:20
5.	"Bicstan"	Birchard	4:45
6.	"Stump"	Birchard	4:21
7.	"Dance Forever"	Birchard; Mette Towley	3:05
8.	"Bow"	Birchard; Clarence Coffee, Jr.	2:41
9.	"Is It Supposed"	Birchard; Tayla Parx	6:14
10.	"Lonely Days"	Birchard; Faith Evans	5:29
11.	"Redeem"	Birchard; Chad Hugo	2:08
12.	"Rain Shadow"	Birchard	3:12
13.	"Kpipe"	Birchard; KÁRYYN	3:10
14.	"3 Sheets to the Wind"	Birchard	2:24
15.	"Some Buzz"	Norman Whiteside	2:36
16.	"Tincture"	Birchard	3:26
17.	"Nork 69"	Birchard	2:10
18.	"Come a Little Closer"	Birchard; Sasha Alex Sloan	3:44
19.	"Ingle Nook Slumber"	Birchard	1:54
Total length:			62:51

Notes

- "Kpipe" is stylised in all caps.

Sample credits

- "Intentions" contains a sample of "I Pray", performed by Copyright, featuring Imaani.
- "Behold" contains a sample of "For Your Glory", performed by Tasha Cobbs.
- "Lonely Days" interpolates "Soon As I Get Home", performed by Faith Evans.
- "Redeem" contains a sample of "Redeemed", performed by Rev. Gerald Thompson. The sample was later removed from streaming services.
- "3 Sheets to the Wind" contains a sample of "Cry Sugar", performed by Dyson's Faces.
- "Some Buzz" contains samples of "God Has Smiled On Me", performed by Rev. James Cleveland, and "I Think I Am In Love With You", performed by Wee.

== Personnel ==
Credits adapted from official liner notes.

=== Musicians ===
- Ross Birchard – instruments (all tracks), production (all tracks), additional keys (track 9)
- Cid Rim – additional drums (track 1)
- Yasmeen Al-Mazeedi – strings (track 1), additional strings (track 10)
- Kwes – piano (track 1)
- Rett Smith – guitar (track 1)
- Johan Lenox – string arrangement (track 1)
- Rag n Bone Broth Man – accordion (track 2)
- L. Ron Weasley – additional triangle (track 3)
- Jamaica Elrahar – vocals (track 5)
- Girth, Wind & Fire – percussion (track 6)
- Mette Towley – vocals (track 7)
- Clarence Coffee Jr – vocals (track 8)
- Dj JeffMillsShoes – scratches (track 8)
- Tayla Parx – additional vocal FX (track 9), vocals (track 16)
- Eli Teplin – additional keys (track 9)
- Tkay Maidza – vocals (track 10)
- Chad Hugo – production (track 11), additional keys (track 11)
- Ayatollah Hogmanay – flexatone (track 12)
- KÁRYYN – production (track 13), vocals (track 13)
- Jonty Chapeau – guiro (track 17)
- Sasha Alex Sloan – vocals (track 18)

=== Technical ===
- Ross Birchard – mixing (all tracks)
- Austin Seltzer – mixing (tracks 1, 5-10, 12-13, 18)
- Joker – mixing (tracks 2, 4, 11, 14-17), mastering

== Charts ==
Chart (2022)	Peak position
UK Dance Albums (OCC)	2
