= CCCLX =

Studio album by Lunice
- Released: September 8, 2017
- Genre: Electronic
- Length: 40:49
- Label: LuckyMe
- Producer: Lunice

Lunice chronology
180 (2015)	CCCLX (2017)	Moving Parts (2017)

CCCLX is the debut solo studio album by Lunice. It was released via LuckyMe on September 8, 2017. It includes contributions from CJ Flemings, Sophie, Le1f, King Mez, Speng, Denzel Curry, JK the Reaper, Nell, Mike Dean, and Syv De Blare. The album's title is "360" in Roman numerals.

== Critical reception ==
Professional ratings
Aggregate scores
Source	Rating
Metacritic	63/100
Review scores
Source	Rating
Clash	6/10
Exclaim!	8/10
The Observer	2/5 stars
Pitchfork	5.7/10
PopMatters	6/10 stars
Resident Advisor	3.5/5
The Skinny	4/5 stars

At Metacritic, which assigns a weighted average score out of 100 to reviews from mainstream critics, the album received an average score of 63, based on 7 reviews, indicating "generally favorable reviews".

Ross Devlin of The Skinny gave the album 4 out of 5 stars, writing, "Inspired and committed to dance in all forms, CCCLX introduces Lunice as an expansive, high-minded producer that takes his art seriously." Peter Ellman of Exclaim! gave the album an 8 out of 10, commenting that "Lunice's skill and vision imbue the whole record with balance and cohesion, but a number of guests help liven the energy on this dark, heavy, beat-driven record." He added, "The tightly coiled rhythms and ominous moods show influences from trap to dubstep, but with around 10 years of mixtapes, remixes and other projects under his belt, the individual influences have long-simmered for a fine blend."

== Track listing ==
No.	Title	Length
1.	"CCCLX (Curtain)" (featuring CJ Flemings)	3:42
2.	"Tha Doorz"	3:13
3.	"Drop Down" (featuring SOPHIE & Kalifa)	2:49
4.	"Elevated" (featuring CJ Flemings & King Mez)	4:21
5.	"Mazerati"	3:50
6.	"Freeman" (featuring CJ Flemings & Speng)	3:55
7.	"CCCLX II (Intermission)"	3:43
8.	"Distrust" (featuring Denzel Curry, J.K. The Reaper & Nell)	2:53
9.	"CCCLX III (Costume)" (featuring Mike Dean)	3:43
10.	"O.N.O"	3:39
11.	"CCCLX IV (Black Out)" (featuring Syv De Blare)	5:01
