= Lantern (Hudson Mohawke album) =

Studio album by Hudson Mohawke
- Released: 16 June 2015
- Genre: Electronic
- Length: 47:17
- Label: Warp
- Producer: Hudson Mohawke

Hudson Mohawke chronology
Chimes (2014)	Lantern (2015)	Ded Sec – Watch Dogs 2 (2016)

Hudson Mohawke studio album chronology
Butter (2009)	Lantern (2015)	Cry Sugar (2022)

Professional ratings
Aggregate scores
Source	Rating
Metacritic	70/100
Review scores
Source	Rating
AllMusic	3.5/5 stars
Clash	5/10
Consequence of Sound	B
Exclaim!	8/10
The Guardian	4/5 stars
Pitchfork	7.4/10
Resident Advisor	3.3 stars on a 5 point scale
Rolling Stone	3/5 stars
The Skinny	4/5 stars
Spin	7/10

Lantern is the second studio album by Scottish producer and DJ Hudson Mohawke. It was released on Warp on 16 June 2015. It features guest appearances from vocalists including Anohni, Miguel, and Jhené Aiko.

== Critical reception ==
At Metacritic, which assigns a weighted average score out of 100 to reviews from mainstream critics, Lantern received an average score of 70, based on 23 reviews, indicating "generally favourable reviews".

Billboard named it the 6th best dance/electronic album of 2015, while The Skinny named it the 35th best album of 2015.

== Track listing ==
Standard edition
No.	Title	Writer(s)	Producer(s)	Length
1.	"Lantern"	Hudson Mohawke; Evelyn Jane Mason	Hudson Mohawke	1:58
2.	"Very First Breath" (featuring Irfane)	Mohawke; Christopher Irfane Khan-Acito	Mohawke	3:04
3.	"Ryderz"	Mohawke; D. J. Rogers	Mohawke	2:42
4.	"Warriors" (featuring Ruckazoid and Devauex)	Mohawke; Ricci Rucker	Mohawke	4:22
5.	"Kettles"		Mohawke	3:03
6.	"Scud Books"	Mohawke	Mohawke	3:44
7.	"Indian Steps" (featuring Anohni)	Mohawke; Anohni; Kwesi Sey	Mohawke	4:36
8.	"Lil Djembe"	Mohawke	Mohawke	2:34
9.	"Deepspace" (featuring Miguel)	Mohawke; Miguel Pimentel	Mohawke	4:13
10.	"Shadows"	Mohawke; Anders Hansson; DJ Gammer; Matthew Lee; Molly Smitten-Downes	Mohawke	2:30
11.	"Resistance" (featuring Jhené Aiko)	Mohawke; Jhené Aiko; Bas Bron; James Fauntleroy	Mohawke	3:49
12.	"Portrait of Luci"	Mohawke	Mohawke	3:12
13.	"System"	Mohawke	Mohawke	4:16
14.	"Brand New World"	Mohawke; Denise Pearson	Mohawke	3:14
Total length:				47:17

== Charts ==
Chart (2015)	Peak position
Belgian Albums (Ultratop Flanders)	62
Belgian Albums (Ultratop Wallonia)	153
Scottish Albums (OCC)	75
UK Albums (OCC)	82
UK Album Downloads (OCC)	67
UK Dance Albums (OCC)	13
UK Independent Albums (OCC)	10
US Top Dance/Electronic Albums (Billboard)	10
US Heatseekers Albums (Billboard)	9
