= Moxie (DJ) =

Radio and nightclub disc jockey

- Born: Alice Moxom; November 28, 1989 (age 36)
- Genre: electronic
- Occupations: DJ; music publisher; promoter

Alice Moxom (born 28 November 1989) in London, England, known professionally as Moxie, is a London based DJ, music publisher and event promoter.

== Career ==
Learning to DJ from a young age, her career as a radio DJ started in 2010 on Kiss FM and she has subsequently held residencies at BBC Radio 1 as well as at NTS Radio. Her NTS residency is one of the longest running of the station. Moxie shifted from a weekly timeslot to fortnightly in late 2025. In 2016 she founded the On Loop record label and events company, with the aim of promoting women in the electronic music industry, which was considered one of Mixmag's Top 20 labels of 2017 and was nominated at the DJ Mag awards for Best Compilation.

In 2017, Time Out rated her NTS radio show as one of London's top ten and Mixmag identified her as part of a growing trend favoring DJs as music "selectors" rather than traditional producers. In 2018, one of her DJ mixes was included in Pitchfork's monthly top eight and The List considered that she was "rapidly becoming one of the most prominent DJs in the UK, and beyond".

In 2019 she was nominated for DJ Mag's Best Of British awards 2019 in the Best Resident DJ category and performed at Glastonbury Festival. The Guardian claimed that she had "helped define a joyous, breakbeat-friendly corner of the house and techno underground. Resident Advisor list her as one of the top 1000 electronic music artists globally.
