= Eclair Fifi =

- Eclair Fifi performing in London, September 2012

Background information
- Born: Clair Stirling; 26 October 1982 (age 43); Edinburgh, Scotland, United Kingdom
- Origin: Scotland
- Genres: Electronica, latin freestyle, hip hop, techno, underground
- Occupations: DJ, illustrator, radio presenter, model
- Instruments: Turntable, sampler
- Label: LuckyMe
- Website: Archived 2021-06-22 at the Wayback Machine

Clair Stirling, known more widely by her stage name Eclair Fifi, is a Scottish DJ, artist and illustrator, currently signed to LuckyMe. She is an illustrator & designer for the label and hosts a monthly show on London radio station NTS Radio.

== DJ ==
Introduced to dance music from an early age through her parents interest in Detroit Techno and Chicago House, at 16 years old Eclair Fifi DJ'd on a pirate show on 'Interface' – one of the world's first radio stations broadcasting online. As a club dj she currently holds a residency at Paris Social Club as well as Hoya:Hoya in Manchester. She has recorded mixes for FACT, Triple J and URB and was "Azealia Banks' go-to DJ" for her special Mermaid's Ball Party in London.

In 2013, she was a resident on BBC Radio One in New DJs We Trust, playing to average audience of 2 million listeners.

2019 she started her own label River Rapid which to date has put out releases by: Afrodeutsche, Santiago Salazar, and DC Salas.

In March 2024, she announced that Meta had permanently banned her Instagram account.

== Artist and Illustrator ==
Eclair Fifi is a graduate of Edinburgh College of Art. She is a regular contributor to the aesthetics of LuckyMe and has designed guest artist merchandise for Bleep.com. She designed the artwork for Baauer's laser etch 12" vinyl, Dum Dum and Machinedrum's Vapor City.

== Model ==
Eclair Fifi modelled as part of the H&M campaign "H&M Loves Music."
