= Garrett Wayne Smith =

American singer-songwriter

Rett Smith
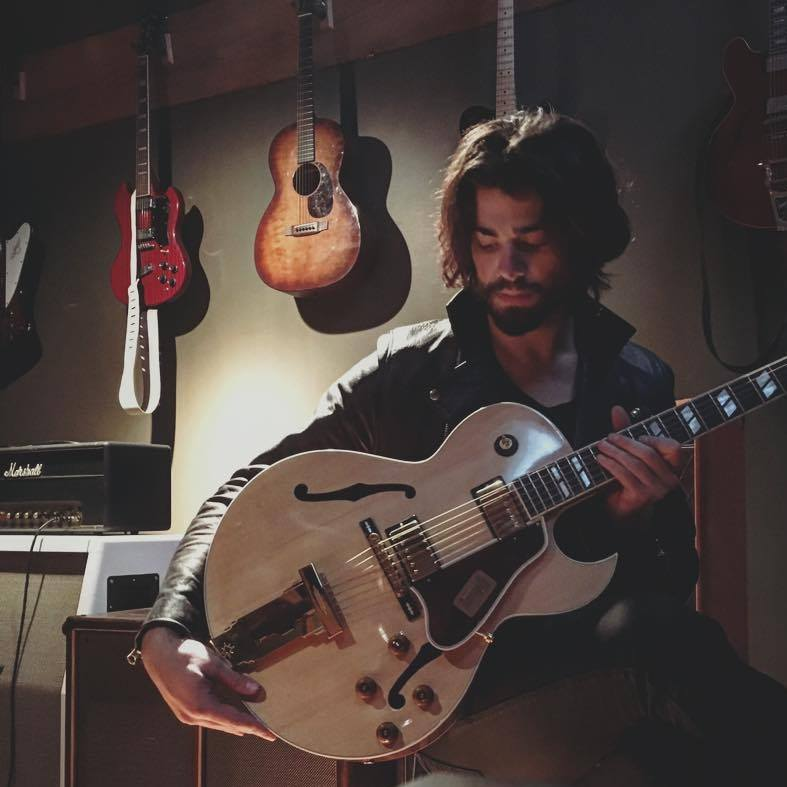

Background information
- Also known as: Rett Smith
- Genres: Rock, Alternative Rock, Post Punk, Americana, Singer-Songwriter
- Instruments: Guitar, Vocals, Bass, Slide Guitar
- Labels: Imperial Records, Universal Music Group
- Formerly of: Saents
- Website: Official website

Garrett Wayne Smith (known as Rett Smith; born 1988) is an American singer-songwriter, producer and guitarist.

== Sporting career ==
Smith competed internationally in alpine skiing in the 2000s, was a Junior Olympic medalist, participated in International Ski Federation races beginning in 2003 and competed in the Nor-Am Cup in 2004-2007. However, he was forced to retire from skiing after sustaining multiple injuries.

== Musical career ==
After his retirement from skiing Smith moved to Los Angeles and began focusing on songwriting, releasing a demo EP which drew attention. Despite never having performed in public before, he made his debut at the House of Blues performing his own works. A video of him performing his song "Warmest Winter" brought him to the attention of producer Joe Nicolo, who became his "career guru". Smith's first solo EP, Tularosa, produced by Nicolo, was released in 2015.

Smith moved to Nashville in 2015, where he recorded his second solo EP, Oscuro, which he produced himself. He formed a duo called SAENTS with session drummer Daniel Sousa, and they released an eponymous EP produced by Stephen Keech in 2017.

=== Giving Up on Quitting ===
In 2020, Smith released Giving Up on Quitting, his first full‑band solo studio album and a notable shift toward minimalist, atmospheric Americana. Produced with Laura‑Mary Carter of the English alternative rock band Blood Red Shoes, the album was recorded in just eight days at 64 Sound in Los Angeles and features stripped‑down instrumentation and lyrics exploring heartbreak, addiction, and accountability. Critics praised its raw emotional tone and restrained sonic palette. No Depression described it as "self‑contained rock with just enough grit to make it roll," American Songwriter named it "Best New Music" and highlighted the single "Better Day" for its confessional lyricism. Meanwhile, FLOOD Magazine premiered the track “Rattlesnakes,” calling it a "dark, melancholic track" that "digs into the gothic heart of Americana," and quoted Smith admitting, "In 'Rattlesnakes,' this seems to be proven more than just about any other song on the record." Its moody textures and narrative focus helped establish Smith’s signature aesthetic and laid the foundation for the darker, more experimental direction of his subsequent records.

=== What the Walls Cannot See ===
In October 2021, Smith released his sophomore full-band studio album What the Walls Cannot See, recorded primarily solo during the COVID‑19 lockdown and co-produced by Jason Burt and mixed by Tom Soares. The album blends brooding, minimalist Americana textures with intensely lyrical storytelling. The Austin Chronicle described it as a "dark and brooding platter that sounds like Nick Cave raised on Texas songwriters," while Holler noted that "some of the melancholy content inherent in this short (24‑minute) album…is the result of recording it basically solo during the lockdown." KUTX previewed the single "Pick Up the Pieces" as a "brooding, sweet‑but‑sinister" track, and Smith himself commented, "Sometimes I feel the heaviest music is the rawest, stripped back emotionally and sonically," reflecting his intent to bring lyrics to the forefront. The album’s seven-song, 23-minute runtime spotlighted its emotional immediacy and helped solidify Smith’s reputation for stark, psychologically attuned Americana music.

=== Americana Drugs ===
In 2022, Smith released the EP Americana Drugs, a four-song collection that blended heavier rock elements with his brooding, confessional lyricism. The EP features a collaboration with Jessica Lea Mayfield on the track “I’ll Still Stay,” following their earlier work together on Smith's 2021 single “The Hook.” Critics highlighted tracks like “Brighton Bar” and “Better Run” for their gritty storytelling and noir-inspired atmosphere, while the closer “Billy Wayne Reed” pointed to Smith’s growing interest in psychedelic textures. The Austin Chronicle praised the EP as “12 minutes of raw, cathartic release.”

=== A Nightly Consequence ===
In June 2023, Smith released A Nightly Consequence, a rock-driven album that expands on his transition from Americana into darker, electric territory. Produced and recorded entirely by Smith himself, the album features layered guitars and atmospheric arrangements. The song “Crawling,” a duet with Lydia Loveless, blends raw vocal interplay with tense, guitar-heavy instrumentation.

=== A Weighted Remorse ===
Smith released A Weighted Remorse on September 13, 2024, continuing his exploration of darker sonic territories with a heavier emphasis on shoegaze and post-Americana textures. The album marked a stylistic evolution, incorporating what KUTX described as "subterranean six-string tone and massive drums," with the result being "heavy as hell, almost bordering on sludge."

Billboard praised Smith for indulging "his love for high-octane guitar riffs" and mining "his own hardships for lyrical inspiration," tying his approach to the legacy of iconic Texas songwriters. The album’s lead singles, including "Sunsets" and "Stop Signs," were highlighted by KUTX as emblematic of Smith’s genre-defying style, blending "shoegaze-icana" with lyrical introspection and sonic weight.

=== A Physical Persistence ===
Released in October 2025, Smith's fifth studio album, A Physical Persistence, was recorded using an analog-only workflow, with the material written, produced, and tracked largely in isolation. The record continues his move toward heavier, distortion-focused arrangements while retaining the introspective songwriting of his previous releases. Coverage of the album described its sound as blending post-punk, rock and Americana influences, with an emphasis on raw, live-style guitar performances and minimal editing.

Lyrically, the album explores themes of endurance, self-confrontation and emotional strain, along with reflections on religion, gender constructs and their perceived toxicity. Reviewers noted that the solitary, analog-focused process shaped the album’s tone, pairing dense guitar arrangements with lyrics concerned with toxic masculinity, religious doubt and heightened self-awareness. Smith has cited literary influences, including the work of William S. Burroughs, as informing the record’s more fragmented and confrontational edge.

A Physical Persistence attracted attention in the music press for its unified aesthetic and analog-driven production. It’s Psychedelic Baby Magazine highlighted the album’s impassioned presentation and use of analog tools in an isolated setting, and described Smith as a post-punk artist associated with gothic Americana. Notion emphasised the album’s analog-only construction and characterised it as his frankest songwriting to date. A track-by-track feature in Louder Than War framed the record as capturing an artist pushing against his own limits and described it as one of his most fully realised works. The lead single, “End On Top”, premiered by New Noise Magazine, was described as “post-punk-infused Americana” and drew comparisons to artists such as Nick Cave and Jack White.

=== Let You Fall ===
In March 2026, Smith released the single "Let You Fall." The track was written, produced and recorded at his Los Angeles studio Tularosa Sound, with Michael Rinne on bass, Chris Barber on drums, and mastering by Stefan Brown at Abbey Road Studios. Clash described the song as "darkly anthemic" and connected Smith's guitar-forward sound to a lineage that includes Nick Cave, Jack White and Mark Lanegan. Metal Magazine highlighted the track's balance of distorted guitar arrangements with restrained, vulnerable vocals, and characterised the song as centred on the acceptance that one cannot save another person from self-destruction.

== Reception ==
Rett Smith has received critical praise for his blend of dark Americana, rock, and post-punk. Billboard described his music as “equal parts tortured blues, gospel, soul, and murder ballad,” noting his commitment to emotionally raw songwriting and intense performances. Flood Magazine called his 2020 single “Rattlesnakes” “a dark, melancholic track [that] digs into the gothic heart of Americana.”

Soho House named Smith “the future of American rock ’n’ roll,” citing his “unapologetic sombre sound rooted in the past.” Holler Country described his 2021 album What the Walls Cannot See as “a stark, unflinching listen,” with “dark, confessional weight.” Paste Magazine featured his live performance in a full Paste Studio session, highlighting his “gritty, dynamic stage presence.”

American Songwriter named “Better Day” a Best New Music pick, and KUTX 98.9 featured “Stop Signs” and “Pick Up the Pieces” as Song of the Day in 2024. antiMusic.com praised his 2023 duet “Cabin Song” with Jessica Lea Mayfield as “intense and cinematic,” drawing comparisons to Nick Cave.

Smith’s work has also been covered by Texas Monthly, which praised his “West Texas roots and sonic authenticity,” and by BrooklynVegan for his 2021 single “The Hook,” described as “a stark, emotional reckoning.” Earlier, NYLON premiered “One to Blame,” highlighting Smith’s “soulful grit and restraint.” No Depression praised his early work as “self-contained rock with just enough grit to make it roll.”

== Discography ==
- Tularosa (2015), Sony RED
- Oscuro (2016), Sony RED
- SAENTS (with SAENTS, 2017), Sony RED
- Giving Up on Quitting (2020), Imperial Records / Republic Records
- Live...Alone (2020), Imperial Records / Republic Records
- What the Walls Cannot See (2021), Imperial Records / Republic Records
- Americana Drugs (2022), Imperial Records / Republic Records
- A Nightly Consequence (2023), Imperial Records / Republic Records
- A Weighted Remorse (2024), Imperial Records / Republic Records
- A Physical Persistence (2025), Imperial Records / Republic Records
- Let You Fall (2025), Universal Records / Universal Music Group

== See also ==
- Jessica Lea Mayfield
- Lydia Loveless
- Hudson Mohawke
