= Butcher Bros. =

Music production team

- Origin: Philadelphia, Pennsylvania, U.S.
- Label: Ruffhouse Records
- Members: Phil and Joe Nicolo

The Butcher Bros. is an American music production team made up of brothers Phil and Joe Nicolo, originally based out of Philadelphia in the mid-to-late '80s. Together and individually, the brothers have produced albums for a wide variety of bands, including Urge Overkill, John Lennon, Bob Dylan, Amy Grant, Cypress Hill, Nine Inch Nails, Dog Eat Dog, Anthrax, Rett Smith, and Luscious Jackson. While Joe Nicolo was the original "butcher" he later paired briefly with his brother as Butcher Bros. Joe continues today as Joe the Butcher. The brothers began their music careers as teenagers, fixing speakers and rewiring amplifiers at a local drive-in movie theater. After earning a B.S. in Science from Temple University, Phil returned to Philadelphia and the brothers founded the Studio 4 recording studio. Using the name "Butcher Bros.", a reference to their father's trade, they quickly established themselves in many genres of music production. Sometimes they would work together and other times, individually.

Phil Nicolo's early credits include the Hooters, Nighthawks and Willie Nile. While working with those bands, he was also working with Kris Kross, Teddy Pendergrass and Taj Mahal. Joe completed mixes of Billy Joel's "The River of Dreams", 3 Cypress Hill albums, Schoolly D, Jazzy Jeff and The Fresh Prince, the Rolling Stones' "Love Is Strong", Aerosmith's "Falling In Love" and James Taylor's "A Little More Time" and Phil co-produced and mixed Sting's "When We Dance", John Lennon's "Do The Oz", Bob Dylan's "Tell Old Bill", Dishwalla's "Counting Blue Cars", and "Under Pressure" with British rockers Keane.

In 1989, Joe Nicolo and Chris Schwartz, founded Ruffhouse Records. Over the next decade, the label sold over 100 million units through Sony distribution. The label would release albums from Lauryn Hill, the Fugees, Cypress Hill, Kris Kross and Wyclef Jean and accounted for 12 of Columbia Records' 39 Grammy nominations in 1990. To accommodate a busy production schedule, the brothers renovated a warehouse in Conshohocken, Pennsylvania, and converted it into studios, digital editing rooms and offices. In 1993, Phil founded MasterVoice, a mastering lab.

In 2002, Joe joined forces with Merv Griffin and RKO Pictures as Executive Producer of the film Shade - a movie that can be best described as being a cross between The Sting and Pulp Fiction. The movie stars Jamie Foxx, Gabriel Byrne, Thandiwe Newton, Sylvester Stallone and Melanie Griffith. Joe also serves as music supervisor on the film and will be overseeing the music on several other RKO films in the future. In April 2003, Joe Nicolo was honored by the Philadelphia Chapter of NARAS (The Grammys) by being awarded The Heroes Award as recognition of his outstanding work and contributions to the U.S. music industry on both a national and local level. In 2004, Joe entered into a production and distribution deal with Light-year/Warner Bros. Warners is currently distributing (for Joe's company Judgment Entertainment) a DVD series on funny cars and dragsters, Jailbait, Laura Smiles, as well as the Judgment Picture Shade. Joe is also producing several new movie releases: Return to Sleepaway Camp, Southern Gothic and Tooth and Nail-both directed by Mark Young, and One Part Sugar starring Danny DeVito, Justin Long, and Dylan Walsh.

Phil is an adjunct professor at Temple University. He won a Grammy in 2005 for mixing and mastering the Spanish Harlem Orchestra's "Across 110th Street".
