= EHFM =

History
- Founded: 2018

Links
- Website: ehfm.live

EHFM is a community radio station based in Edinburgh, Scotland. The station was founded in 2018 by local DJs searching for a platform beyond the nightclubs to promote increased diversity and community in the capital's music scene. Along with an online broadcast, all shows are recorded and available on demand through EHFM's website. The station runs a three-tiered subscription model through the platform Patreon where subscribers receive access to a mailing list and discounts for local businesses. The station previously broadcast out of the arts venue Summerhall prior to moving to a cafe in the area of Leith.

== Programming ==
The station broadcasts 24/7 with a regular weekday morning show hosted by a selection of EHFM's resident presenters and a mixture of both live and pre-recorded shows normally ranging between 1–2 hours in length. They frequently host special programmes and events both through their broadcast and in collaboration with the music venue Sneaky Pete's. The roster contains over 90 shows hosted by local bands, DJs, journalists, venue owners and record labels.

== See also ==
- NTS
