= Butter (Hudson Mohawke album) =

Studio album by Hudson Mohawke
- Released: 26 October 2009
- Genre: Wonky; electronic; hip-hop
- Length: 51:05
- Label: Warp
- Producer: Hudson Mohawke

Hudson Mohawke chronology
Polyfolk Dance (2009)	Butter (2009)	Satin Panthers (2011)

Hudson Mohawke studio album chronology
Butter (2009)	Lantern (2015)

Singles from Butter
- 1. "Star Crackout" Released: 2008; 2. "Joy Fantastic" Released: 2009

Butter is the debut studio album by Hudson Mohawke, the alias of Scottish musician Ross Birchard. It was released on Warp Records on 26 October 2009, to positive reviews from critics.

== Background ==
In 2009, Hudson Mohawke signed to Warp Records, despite a very limited track record of official releases; in fact, the bulk of his releases were unofficial tracks and DJ mixes circulated on the Internet, as well as his 2006 Hudson's Heeters mixtape. Butter is his debut album and second release on Warp following the 2008 Polyfolk Dance EP. The album’s artwork was designed by Birchard’s friend Tom Scholefield (a.k.a. Konx-Om-Pax), with both working from a folder of influences they wanted to incorporate, including "the '80s t-shirts Ross and Dom [Flannigan] liked with wolves and bad airbrush animal art." The album features collaborations with Dâm-Funk, Nadsroic, and Olivier Daysoul, the latter an American singer who contributes to two tracks.

Birchard described his recording setup as "very simple," explaining "I’m more interested in the equipment being usable and immediate, rather than spending loads of time tweaking things." Most of the album was made in the audio program FruityLoops using free plug-ins. Mohawke also used hardware such as an Ensoniq VFX and Roland W30 "for lots of vintage dancey sounds" as well as a Korg M50, and sampled his own MIDI programming. He premiered the material at LA's Low End Theory, where it was received positively, although some feedback from the more purist hip-hop DJs was less positive.

== Reception ==
Professional ratings
Aggregate scores
Source	Rating
Metacritic	80/100
Review scores
Source	Rating
AllMusic	4/5 stars
BBC Music	favorable
Clash	7/10
Drowned in Sound	8/10
The Guardian	4/5 stars
NME	7/10
Pitchfork	6.7/10
PopMatters	8/10
Q	4/5 stars
Resident Advisor	3.5/5

At Metacritic, which assigns a weighted average score out of 100 to reviews from mainstream critics, Butter received an average score of 80, based on 9 reviews, indicating "generally favorable reviews".

AllMusic called it "A fearless scrap heap mutation that incorporates icebox IDM crunch, DayGlo synthesizer funk and, most notably, late-'80s/early-'90s R&B flourishes." AJ Ramirez of PopMatters gave the album 8 stars out of 10, commenting that "While Butter's fascination with chaotic beats and sonic experimentalism fit right into the Warp aesthetic, the album is remarkably accessible, liable to inspire head-bobbing motions of approval." The Guardian wrote that "listening to Butter can feel like eavesdropping on the future," adding that "It's like eating candyfloss and helium on a speeding rollercoaster: exhilarating and discombobulating in equal measure."

In retrospect, DJ Jake Jenkins called the album "one of the most iconic releases in the LET / beat-scene paradigm. There is a peculiar technicolour to the album that was unlike the other instrumental hip-hop coming out of LA at the time." Birchard stated that within five or six years of release, he began hearing about the influence of the album on other artists, but "what I was doing was just doing shit for fun basically and wearing the influences of it on my sleeve, and it wasn’t done with the intention of anything else [...] If I was going to do it all over again, I would do it exactly the same." In 2020, Clash named it among the 20 best Scottish albums of the 21st century.

== Track listing ==
No.	Title	Length
1.	"Shower Melody"	1:21
2.	"Gluetooth"	3:47
3.	"Joy Fantastic" (featuring Olivier Daysoul)	3:59
4.	"3.30"	1:35
5.	"Trykk"	2:13
6.	"Fruit Touch"	3:57
7.	"ZOo00OOm"	2:42
8.	"Acoustic Lady"	2:07
9.	"Rising 5"	3:12
10.	"Twistclip Loop"	1:23
11.	"Just Decided" (featuring Olivier Daysoul)	3:50
12.	"No One Could Ever"	2:19
13.	"Velvet Peel"	2:16
14.	"Tell Me What You Want from Me" (featuring Dâm-Funk)	2:58
15.	"Fuse"	3:10
16.	"Star Crackout"	4:55
17.	"Allhot" (featuring Nadsroic)	2:43
18.	"Black n Red"	2:44

== Personnel ==
Credits adapted from liner notes.

- Hudson Mohawke – production, writing
- Olivier Daysoul – vocals, writing (tracks 3, 11)
- Dâm-Funk – vocals, writing (track 14)
- Nadsroic – vocals, writing (track 14)
- Naweed – mastering
- Sun Rab – effects
- Wednesday Nite – mbira (track 9)
- Sir Anthony Chopkins – samples
- Tweeter Cushing – tambourine
- Queefer Sutherland – trombone (track 6)
- Konx-Om-Pax – design
- Brian Sweeney – photography
