= NTS Radio =

Online radio station based in London

- Industry: Music, Radio and Entertainment
- Founded: April 2011
- Founder: Femi Adeyemi
- Headquarters: London, England
- Area served: Worldwide
- Key people: Femi Adeyemi (CCO); Sean McAuliffe (CEO)
- Website: nts.live

NTS Radio (also known as NTS Live or simply NTS) is a music radio platform founded in 2011 in Hackney, London by Femi Adeyemi "for an international community of music lovers". The platform prioritises showcasing niche artists in its radio programming and live events. NTS Radio's tagline is "Don't Assume".

In 2024, The New York Times reported that the station had an average of 360,000 daily listeners during March of that year. The same article reported that "around 40 percent of the music played on NTS is not available on Spotify". In December 2025, 032c reported that NTS had 6 million monthly listeners globally.

NTS Radio has featured guest shows, mixes, selections and station takeovers presented by prominent artists, including Björk, Thom Yorke, Robert Smith of the Cure, Robyn, Thurston Moore, Kim Gordon, Jarvis Cocker, Questlove, Erykah Badu, Neneh Cherry, Aphex Twin and Mac DeMarco.

In June 2023, Universal Music Group purchased a shareholding between 25% and 50% in NTS and subsequently became NTS's largest shareholder.

== Origins ==
The name NTS is an abbreviation for 'Nuts To Soup', which was the name of a previous blog run by Adeyemi. Adeyemi, who had also been involved in founding Boiler Room, started NTS on a budget of £5,000, inspired by his love of pirate radio, MTV2, US college radio stations like WFMU and the creative community around London nightclub Plastic People (where he met NTS CEO Sean McAuliffe who was a resident DJ at Plastic People).

In 2013 Adeyemi and McAuliffe incorporated the company NTS Live Ltd together and soon after employed its first employees Shane Connelly, Fergus McDonald, Tabitha Thorlu-Bangura and Padraigh Perkins Edge who had been working as volunteers.

In an interview with Music Business Worldwide in 2020, Adeyemi spoke of starting NTS as a response to a homogenous radio climate; "Pirate radio stations were laser focused on specific sounds and the mainstream radio stations the same... there are so many different tastes in London, why don't we just set up this thing that plays everything? Let's keep it as diverse as possible".

In a 2024 interview with The London Standard, Adeyemi mentioned that after having taught himself how to stream, he placed posters around London reading 'independent radio station in London'. He went on to say, "I thought I'd probably get around 10 to 15 people reply but there were almost 60 people. I realised 'wow there's some legs in this'".

== Programming and creative ==
In the same Music Business Worldwide interview from 2020, McAuliffe says "From a curatorial point of view, the global community of artists and record collectors involved in NTS is nuts. They make NTS what it is. We don't chase numbers. We’re just passionate about the music and artists we love and we let the music do the talking...we’re not like traditional radio where hosts may be told what to play. All of that is out the window. NTS is all about total freedom of expression".

According to the Financial Times, part of NTS's "success is down to the quality and underground nature of its DJs and live performances". Across NTS two live channels, there are currently over 700 resident artists, music producers, DJs and record collectors globally that make up the regular shows on the platform, most of whom own share options in the company. Regular hosts have ranged from the likes of Sunn O)))'s Stephen O'Malley to The XX's Jamie xx, Yellow Magic Orchestra's Haruomi Hosono, Ethel Cain, Clairo, Yaeji, rapper Zack Fox, Show Me the Body, Theo Parrish, Moxie, Jim O'Rourke, Oneohtrix Point Never, Four Tet, Mark Leckey, Floating Points, artist Martine Syms, Eclair Fifi, Kelsey Lu, Erol Alkan, Moor Mother, Fenriz, Coby Sey, Smithsonian Folkways, The Numero Group, jazz musician Angel Bat Dawid, and Andrew Weatherall. The NTS breakfast show (broadcast from their London studios) was called The Do!! You!!! Breakfast Show and was presented by Charlie Bones up until August 2021. Bones was often joined by guest hosts and performers. Bones' slot was initially filled by a rotating selection of guest hosts, before the station overhauled their morning schedule. Flo Dill and Louise Chen became the resident breakfast hosts in 2024 The show is now hosted solely by Dill after Chen switched to a wednesday show in 2025.

From these guest shows, many have been used by the hosts as an opportunity to premiere new music, with the following airing their releases as a 'first listen' on NTS before official release; Death Grips, Arca, Flying Lotus, Jeff Mills, Dean Blunt, Nicolas Jaar, Kelela, Autechre, Mount Kimbie and Arthur Russell have all debuted on NTS in recent years.

In late 2018, NTS launched a new feature called 'Infinite Mixtapes,' which are music-only themed streams without any traditional radio talk-over. Originally exclusive to the NTS iOS app, this led to a feature on the Apple Store as 'App Of The Day' and now accounts for 20% of their overall streaming figures according to Music Business Worldwide.

NTS video output in recent years ranges from live sessions with artists, original music videos, and livestreamed video performance.

NTS programmes live events and club nights across the world throughout the year. This is most prominently the case in London, where NTS has been behind a number of debut UK shows.

== Notable projects, collaborations and partners ==
Every month, NTS curates live music experiences at the Tate Lates event series at the Tate Modern gallery in London -- an event that is co-sponsored by clothing brand Uniqlo.

NTS has an artist development programme called Work In Progress, which aims to take six artists to the next stages of their musical careers. Supported by Carhartt, Work In Progress is run in partnership with Arts Council England, and attracted over 9,000 applicants in its first year.

In April 2018, Autechre announced a four-week residency on NTS that would go on to be the release of their thirteenth album release, NTS Sessions 1–4. It was not made known that the residency would include new material until after the first session was broadcast, leading many to assume that it would be another of the band's extended DJ mixes. A few days after the first session aired, Warp announced that each of the two-hour sessions would be released as a digital download immediately after broadcast, with 12-LP and 8-CD boxed sets of the entire album, as well as 3-LP pressings of each individual session, to be released in July.

NTS launched a capsule clothing collection with Adidas Originals during the summer of 2019, run under the NTS signature tag line of ‘Don't Assume’. The marketing campaign for the collection featured musicians and artists as models, including reggae musician Lee "Scratch" Perry, who was 83-years-old at the time of the photoshoot.

In June 2019, NTS teamed up with independent electronic label Warp Records to celebrate their thirtieth anniversary. Over a long weekend, Warp took over both of NTS' live channels, broadcasting over 100 hours of original content from the likes of Boards of Canada, Brian Eno, Flying Lotus, Death Grips, Ryuichi Sakamoto, Kelela and many more. Celebrated New York jazz record label Blue Note also co-programmed a takeover broadcast with NTS in celebration of their 80th anniversary, which featured radio shows hosted by Jeff Garlin, Dr Lonnie Smith and Don Was.

In September 2019 NTS and Netflix devised a two-day series of workshops and panels about getting into the creative industries, directed at 16-25 year olds in London. The event featured director Jenn Nkiru, Skepta manager Grace Ladoja, former NTS presenter Tiffany Calver and rap engineer Sean D, alongside Top Boy actors Ashley Walters and Micheal Ward.

On 19 February 2020, the Venezuelan experimental musician and artist Arca premiered her new 62-minute single @@@@@ via a special NTS radio show entitled DIVA EXPERIMENTAL FM. The release was accompanied by a audiovisual directed by Frederik Heyman, and was then widely released on 21 February by XL Recordings.

On 2 May 2020, NTS announced a 24-hour charity broadcast called Remote Utopias, raising funds for The Global Foodbanking Network. The broadcast brought together musicians, DJs, artists and filmmakers from across the globe to present radio shows and mixes, exclusive premieres, and live video streams. The likes of Erykah Badu and Tame Impala premiered new music, radio shows and mixes came from the likes of Jonah Hill, JME and Jorja Smith, readings came from the likes of Wolfgang Tillmans, and special video performances from Bladee and Ecco2k, Standing on the Corner and Mica Levi (as Therapy Garden).

For their 10th birthday, NTS was curated by 10 special guests across a week of programming. The curators were Simpsons creator Matt Groening, rising Ghanaian alté star Amaarae, My Bloody Valentine, Patia's Fantasy World, Mica Levi, Liz Johnson Artur, Dopplereffekt, Theo Parrish, Laurie Anderson and Arca. Notable guests that those curators selected across the week ranged from Flea from the Red Hot Chili Peppers to Eric Andre, Marshall Allen from Sun Ra Arkestra to ANOHNI.

Notable NTS brand partners have included Netflix, Rockstar Games, SONOS, YouTube Music, Adidas and Carhartt.

Since 2014, a handful of individuals and businesses have acquired shareholdings in NTS. In June 2023, Universal Music Group purchased a 25% shareholding in NTS and subsequently became NTS's largest shareholder.

== Awards ==
NTS won the 2014 Best Online Radio Station in the World Award from Mixcloud and the official International Radio Awards Festival.

In 2018, Adeyemi, as founder of NTS Radio, won the AIM Independent Music Awards as "Indie Champion" of the year.

In 2019 NTS Radio won the Outstanding Contribution category in DJ Mag's Best of British Awards.

== See also ==
- SoundCloud
- Mixcloud
- Resonance FM
- KCRW
- Rinse FM
- WFMU
- Boiler Room
- Dublab
- EHFM
- The Lot Radio
- 8-Ball Community
