= TNGHT =

Scottish-Canadian electronic music duo

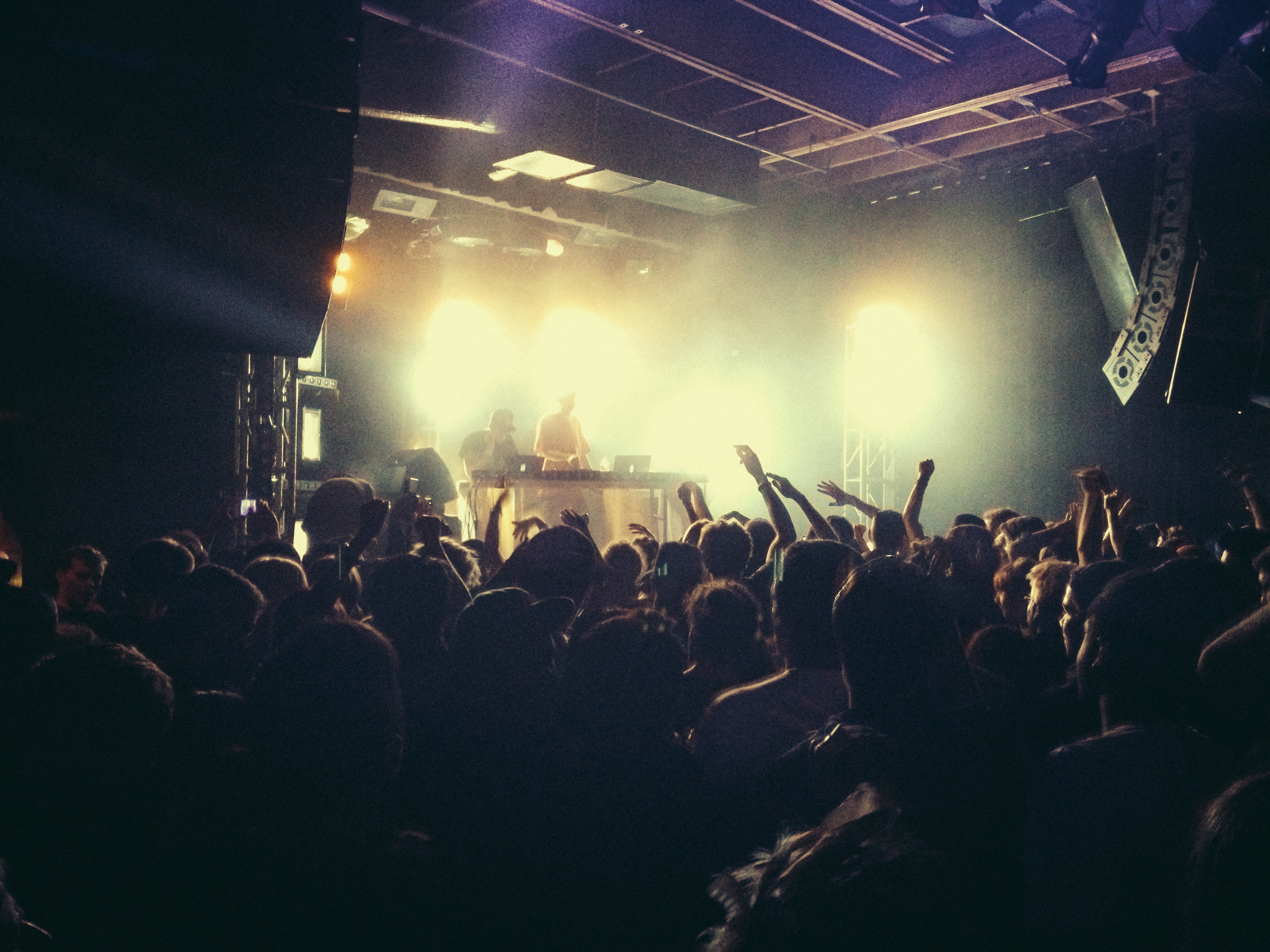
- TNGHT performing in San Francisco in April 2013

Background information
- Genres: Electronic; trap; bass; hip hop
- Years active: 2011–2013, 2019–present
- Labels: Warp; LuckyMe
- Members: Hudson Mohawke; Lunice

TNGHT is a musical duo consisting of Scottish producer Hudson Mohawke and Canadian producer Lunice, formed in 2011. The duo released their self-titled debut EP to positive reviews in 2012. They announced an indefinite hiatus in late 2013, until their return in September 2019.

== Biography ==
Hudson Mohawke (Ross Birchard) and Lunice (Lunice Fermin Pierre II) originally met in 2008, during the first LuckyMe Records tour of North America, when Mohawke performed at the Pop Montreal festival and Lunice played support.

Following a successful performance headlining Warp Records' 2012 SXSW showcase, TNGHT officially debuted with the TNGHT EP, released via Warp X LuckyMe on July 23, 2012.

TNGHT has since performed at multiple venues internationally, including The Opera House, the Coachella music festival and Brooklyn's Music Hall of Williamsburg, which featured an appearance by rapper/producer Kanye West during a remix of West's "Cold".

In 2012, TNGHT produced "Shake Weight" from Duality by Captain Murphy (rap project of Flying Lotus).

In 2013, TNGHT co-produced Kanye West's song "Blood on the Leaves" from his critically acclaimed album Yeezus. The song samples TNGHT's track "R U Ready."

The duo announced their hiatus on December 27, 2013.

On March 8, 2016, Hudson Mohawke tweeted a photo stating: Sneak peek of the @tnght studio sessions.

On June 20, 2017, during an interview with Red Bull Music Academy Lunice announced the band was working on new music.

On September 22, 2019, the duo released "Serpent", their first song in over six years. On October 23, 2019, the duo announced their next EP, "II", along with the release of the song "Dollaz".

On November 4, 2021, the duo released "Tums" as a celebratory song to mark the approaching end of the quarantine caused by the COVID-19 pandemic.

== Discography ==
=== Extended plays ===
Title	Album details
TNGHT	Released: 23 July 2012; Label: Warp / LuckyMe; Formats: Digital download, vinyl
II	Released: 12 November 2019; Label: Warp / LuckyMe; Formats: Digital download, vinyl

=== Singles ===
Title	Single details
"Acrylics"	Released: 9 April 2013; Label: Warp / LuckyMe; Formats: Digital download
"Serpent"	Released: 22 September 2019; Label: Warp / LuckyMe; Formats: Digital download
"Dollaz"	Released: 25 October 2019; Label: Warp / LuckyMe; Formats: Digital download
"Tums"	Released: 4 November 2021; Label: Warp / LuckyMe; Formats: Digital download

=== Remixes ===
- 2012: Kanye West, Big Sean & Jay-Z – "Clique"
- 2012: Waka Flocka Flame – "Rooster in My Rari"
- 2013: Kanye West – "Cold"
