= Káryyn =

Armenian-American composer and singer

- Born: Kárin Tatoyan; Alabama, U.S.
- Origin: Los Angeles, California, U.S.
- Genres: Electronic; art pop; ambient; experimental pop
- Occupations: Composer; musician; producer; singer-songwriter
- Years active: 2011–present
- Labels: Mute; Antevasin
- Website: karyynofficial.com

Káryyn (born Kárin Tatoyan; stylized in all caps) is a Syrian-Armenian-American composer, electronic musician, and producer based in Los Angeles. She is known for a "post-digital" style that integrates operatic vocals with experimental electronics and traditional Armenian influences.

== Early life and education ==
Tatoyan was born in Alabama to a Syrian-Armenian family and raised in Indiana before moving to Los Angeles at age 10. She spent frequent summers in Aleppo, Syria, which she cites as a foundational influence on her musical identity.

At age 16, she left high school to attend Mills College in Oakland, California. She studied under experimental composer Pauline Oliveros, whose "Deep Listening" philosophy became a central element of her work. Tatoyan withdrew after two years to pursue her career independently, later spending time in upstate New York for a period of creative retreat.

== Career ==
In 2017, Káryyn composed the music for Of Light, an avant-garde opera created with director Samantha Shay under the mentorship of Marina Abramović. The performance was praised by Björk as "an extremely nourishing experience."

Her debut compilation album, The Quanta Series, was released on March 29, 2019, via Mute Records. Following a hiatus, she released the EP Calm Kaoss! in June 2024. Clash Magazine described the lead single "Odar" as "arresting" and the project as a "stylistic triumph."

In 2026, she toured the UK and Europe supporting German electronic artist Apparat. In January 2026, she announced her second studio album, Physics Universal Love Language (PULL), produced in collaboration with James Ford and scheduled for release on May 29, 2026.

== Live performances ==
In early 2026, Káryyn toured the UK and Europe as the supporting act for German electronic artist Apparat, with dates in Berlin, London, and Amsterdam. She has previously performed at major international festivals including Sónar and MUTEK.

== Collaborations ==
Káryyn has collaborated with several high-profile electronic producers and artists. Her single "Anthem For Those Who Know" was co-produced by Hudson Mohawke. Her 2024 remix EP featured contributions from Cosey Fanni Tutti, Raven Bush, and HAAi.

== Critical reception ==
Káryyn's debut, The Quanta Series, received critical acclaim, earning a score of 87 on Metacritic. Pitchfork praised her "curiously powerful experimental pop", while Dazed described her as a "visual composer" who develops a unique language through layered vocals and negative space.

== Discography ==
=== Studio albums ===
- The Quanta Series (2019, Mute/Antevasin)
- Physics Universal Love Language (PULL) (2026, Mute)

=== EPs ===
- Quanta 1 (2017)
- Quanta 1:11 (2017)
- Calm Kaoss! (2024)
- Káryyn Remixed (2024)

=== Singles ===
- "Moving Masses" (2017)
- "Aleppo" (2017)
- "Ever" (2019)
- "The Witness" (2021)
- "Anthem for Those Who Know" (2024)
- "Collapse Phase" (2026)
