= Hudson Mohawke =

Scottish music producer (born 1986)

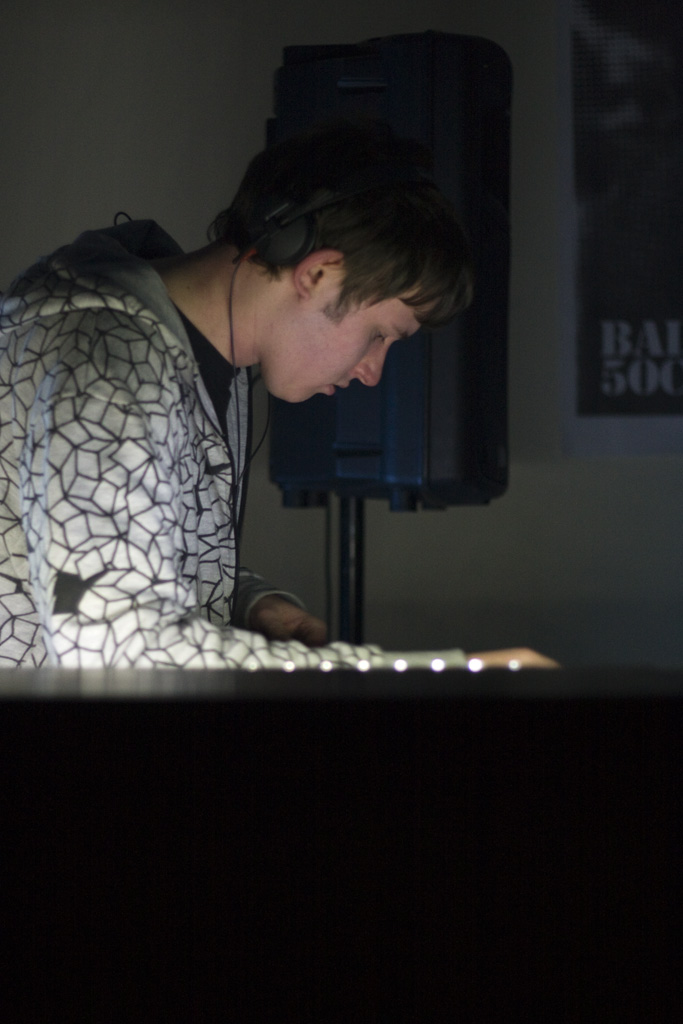
- Mohawke performing in 2009

Background information
- Born: Ross Matthew Birchard; 11 February 1986 (age 40)
- Origin: Glasgow, Scotland, United Kingdom
- Genres: Electronic; hip-hop; wonky; glitch hop; trap; IDM
- Occupations: Record producer; disc jockey; composer; remixer
- Instruments: Turntables; computer
- Labels: GOOD; Warp; LuckyMe
- Member of: TNGHT
- Website: hudsonmohawke.com

Ross Matthew Birchard (born 11 February 1986), better known by the stage name Hudson Mohawke, is a Scottish producer, composer, and DJ from Glasgow, Scotland. He is known for his work in 21st-century hip-hop and electronic music. A founding member of the UK based record label LuckyMe, his fractured take on hip-hop made him a leading figure in the late-2000s wonky scene. He released his debut album Butter in 2009 on Warp Records. He has followed with the solo albums Lantern (2015) and Cry Sugar (2022), both on Warp.

Birchard is also one-half of the duo TNGHT with Canadian producer Lunice; their eponymous EP was released in 2012. That year, Birchard signed with Kanye West's G.O.O.D. Music production team, contributing to the label compilation Cruel Summer (2012) and West's LP Yeezus (2013). He subsequently became an in-demand producer, working with artists such as West, Pusha T, Drake, A$AP Rocky, Lil Wayne, Anohni, and Danny L Harle. In 2022, Birchard's 2011 song "Cbat" became an Internet meme and went viral on social media after a Reddit user revealed that he played the song during sexual intercourse.

== Life and career ==
=== Early years and LuckyMe ===
Ross Matthew Birchard was born on 11 February 1986, and was raised in Glasgow. He is the son of American actor and singer Paul Birchard.

As a preteen, he sold happy hardcore mixes that he put together around his local playground. At the age of 15, Birchard (under the name DJ Itchy) was the youngest UK DMC finalist. His earliest gigs as a club DJ were with Glasgow University's Subcity Radio where he first appeared as part of the culture city kids show and later as part of other shows including Turntable Science with Pro Vinylist Karim and Cloudo's Happy Hardcore show, under the alias DJ Mayhem. During this period, Birchard formed the LuckyMe collective with childhood friends. He adopted the stage name "Hudson Mohawke" after seeing the name engraved on a statue in the hallway of his accommodation. In 2007, Birchard applied to the Red Bull Music Academy and was invited to attend the event in Toronto, where he first met Steve Beckett of Warp Records, who was giving a lecture there, and was to sign Hudson Mohawke two years later.

In addition to his solo work, Hudson Mohawke collaborated with Mike Slott as Heralds of Change, releasing a series of 12" EPs including Show You (2006), Sittin' on the Side (2007), Puzzles (2007) and Secrets (2007) on All City Records. Hudson Mo was also DJ/Producer for the now defunct hip hop group Surface Emp alongside MC's Dom Sum and sometimes 2 Can Dan. Surface Empire released the LuckyMe EP in 2005 on Far Cut Records.

=== 2008–2011: TNGHT and Warp ===
In 2009, Hudson Mohawke signed to Warp Records, despite a very limited track record of official releases; in fact, the bulk of his releases were unofficial tracks and DJ mixes circulated on the Internet, as well as the 2006 mixtape Hudson's Heeters Vol. 1. His first official release to get major notice was entitled "Spotted" on the Rush Hour beat compilation Beat Dimensions Vol 1. In 2008 his 12" EP Ooops! on LuckyMe/Wireblock became an underground sensation, particularly once word spread of his recording contract with Warp. In 2009, Hudson Mohawke released his first studio album, Butter. In that year, he contributed a cover of a Jimi Tenor song, titled "Paint the Stars", to the Warp20 (Recreated) compilation. He would follow with several EPs, including 2011's Satin Panthers. He produced the debut EP for UK band Egyptian Hip Hop at Club Ralph Studios in London, which was released in August 2010. One of his songs, "100hm", has been featured as a track on the video game Grand Theft Auto V, while "Fuse" was featured in Sleeping Dogs and Dirt 3.

Birchard met Canadian producer Lunice during the first LuckyMe Records tour of North America in 2008, with Hudson Mohawke performing at the Pop Montreal festival and Lunice playing support. Following a successful performance headlining Warp Records' 2012 SXSW showcase, the duo's collaborative project TNGHT debuted their TNGHT EP, released via Warp X LuckyMe on 23 July 2012. TNGHT has performed at multiple venues internationally, including The Opera House, the Coachella music festival and Brooklyn's Music Hall of Williamsburg, which featured an appearance by rapper/producer Kanye West during a remix of West's "Cold".

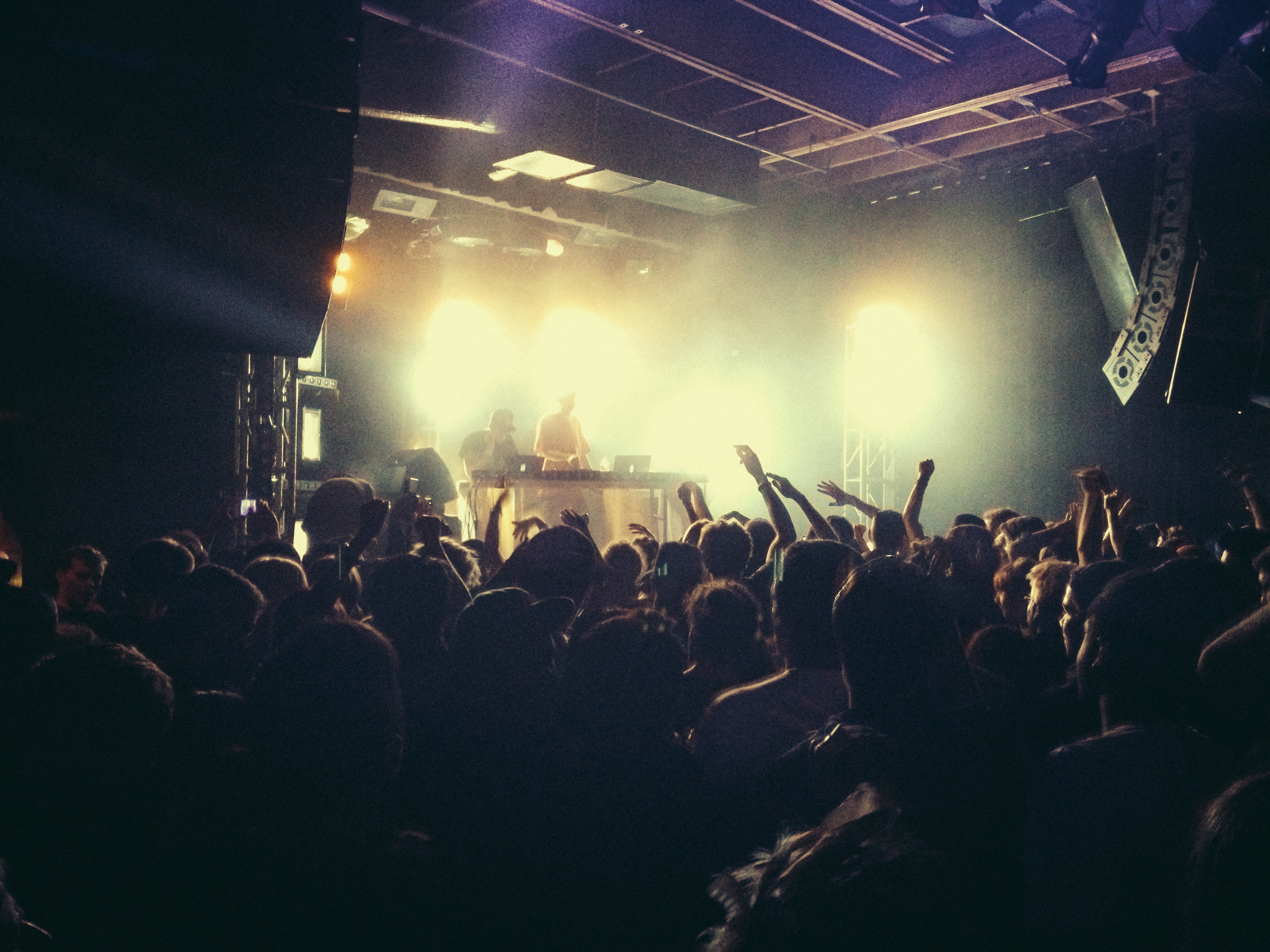
TNGHT performing in 2013

=== 2012–2016: G.O.O.D. Music and Lantern ===
In 2012, Hudson Mohawke began a series of collaborations with Kanye West, resulting in production credits on the GOOD Music label album Cruel Summer. On 17 January 2013, it was announced that Mohawke had officially signed with GOOD Music as a producer, whilst remaining with Warp and LuckyMe as a recording artist. TNGHT announced their hiatus on 27 December 2013. Mohawke co-produced two tracks on West's 2013 album Yeezus ("I Am a God" and "Blood on the Leaves") and contributed to West's 2016 follow-up The Life of Pablo, in addition to working with various other hip hop and pop artists, including Drake, Pusha T, and Future. In 2015, he released his second studio album, Lantern. In 2016, he collaborated with singer Anohni on her 2016 album Hopelessness. Mohawke announced on 26 October 2016 via Twitter that he was creating the original soundtrack for the 2016 video game Watch Dogs 2 titled "Ded Sec" and that Warp Records would release it on 11 November 2016.

=== 2017–present: 3PAC mixtapes, Cry Sugar and "Cbat" virality ===
In 2017, Birchard made a brief TV appearance in Twin Peaks: The Return as a Roadhouse performer. In 2019, Birchard and Lunice reconvened for a second TNGHT EP titled II. In 2020, Birchard released three mixtapes of unreleased archival material dating to his earliest days: B.B.H.E., Poom Gems, and Airborn Lard, which were also collected as the compilation 3PAC. In 2021, he collaborated on Danny L Harle's album Harlecore.

In August 2022, Birchard released his third studio album as Hudson Mohawke, the Warp release Cry Sugar.

On 1 September 2022, Birchard's song "Cbat", from his 2011 EP Satin Panthers, went viral on multiple websites after a Reddit user made a post about how the song's inclusion on his "sex playlist" ruined his relationship.

On 1 December 2023, Birchard released a collaborative album with Tiga called L'Ecstasy under the duo's newly formed label Love Minus Communications.

On 18 June 2025, Birchard appeared as a musical guest on the first episode of the Million Dollar Extreme series Extreme Peace.

In September 2025, Birchard received an "Additional Programming" credit as Hudson Mohawke on the Tron: Ares soundtrack by Nine Inch Nails, with co-production credits on the tracks "As Alive As You Need Me To Be" and "Who Wants To Live Forever?".

== Musical style ==
In 2015, Exclaim! wrote that Birchards's music has developed over the course of his career "from a glitch-y, turntablist jitter to a euphoric, multicolored trap-hop pound and everywhere in between." He has received praise for his "genre-smashing" production approach, in which styles of music are "incorporated, manipulated and bounced against each other." In 2009, during Birchard's debut Essential Mix, DJ Pete Tong proclaimed "Hudson Mohawke is doing for hip-hop what the Aphex Twin did for techno". In 2011, The Guardian characterized his trademark sound as "a vivid, psychedelic melange of J Dilla-esque instrumental hip hop, space-age R&B, bass boom and oldskool rave euphoria, garnished with effervescent FX from unexpected sources." In 2022, journalist Arielle Lana LeJarde of Mixmag described his style as "pouring his chaotic ideas and artistic inclinations into sensory overload."

Following the formation of TNGHT, Birchard and Lunice attempted to strip down their production styles and avoid tracks that were "all over the place". They pioneered the rave subgenre of trap, a style which Birchard called "a kind of parody genre" but which unexpectedly became popular at EDM festivals. He later told Mixmag he felt it got "lost in translation" when it began to separate from its rap roots.

Birchard cites A-Trak and East Coast hip-hop producers like DJ Premier and Pete Rock as influences.

== Discography ==
Albums

- Butter (2009, Warp)
- Lantern (2015, Warp)
- Ded Sec – Watch Dogs 2 (Original Game Soundtrack) (2016, Warp)
- Cry Sugar (2022, Warp)
- L'Ecstasy (with Tiga) (2024, Love Minus Communications)

Mixtapes

- Hudson's Heeters (2006, LuckyMe)
- B.B.H.E. (2020, Warp)
- Poom Gems (2020, Warp)
- Airborne Lard (2020, Warp)

Compilations

- 3PAC (2020, Warp)

EPs

- Lucky Me (2005) (as Surface Empire)
- Choices Vol. 1 (2007)
- Puzzles (2007)
- Secrets (2007)
- Polyfolk Dance (2009)
- Satin Panthers (2011)
- TNGHT (2012) (as TNGHT)
- Hud Mo 100 (2013)
- Chimes (2014)
- II (2019) (as TNGHT)
- Set The Roof (2023) (with Nikki Nair)

Singles

- "Oops!" (2008)
- "Star Crackout" / "Root Hands" / "Everybody Else Is Wrong" (2008)
- "Higher Ground" (2012) (as TNGHT)
- "Acrylics" (2013) (as TNGHT)
- "Chimes" (2014)
- "Chimes RMX" (ft. Pusha T, French Montana, Travis Scott, Future) (2014)
- "Forever 1" (feat. Olivier Day Soul and Dorian Concept) (2015)
- "The Rain" (with S-Type) (2018)
- "Serpent" (2019) (as TNGHT)
- "Dollaz" (2019) (as TNGHT)
- "Love Minus Zero" (with Tiga) (2020)
- "VSOD (Velvet Sky of Dreams)" (with Tiga) (2020)
- "Black Cherry" (2020)
- "What U Need" (2020)
- "Interlocked" (with Danny L Harle as DJ Mayhem) (2021)
- "Tums" (2021) (as TNGHT)
- "Brick Figures" (2021) (as TNGHT)
- "Bicstan" (2022)
- "Dance Forever / Stump" (2022)
- "Pushing On (Always Like Never Before)" (feat. GiGi Grombacher) (2023)
- "Feel the Rush" (with Tiga, feat. Channel Tres) (2023)
- "Ascending Into The Clouds" (with Tiga, feat. Elisabeth Troy) (2023)
- "IN ORDER 2" (with Tiga) (2023)

Appearances as featured artist

- Declaime – "Show Me" (2008)
- Crookers - "Hummus" (2011)
- Boys Noize, Spank Rock - "Birthday" (2016)
- Tiga - "Planet E" (2016)
- Nick Hook - "Evolisontherise" (2016)
- Kito - "Pamplemousse" (2018)
- Dance System - "Hands in the Air" (2020)
- Jimmy Edgar - "BENT" (2020)
- Gammer - "Quit" (2021)
- George Riley - "S e x" (2023)
- Soo Joo - "Running Water" (2024)
- Saint Sinner - "ssdssd" (2024)
- Kesha, Orville Peck, & Tayla Parx - "Tennessee" (2025)
- VTSS & LSDXOXO - "The Lobby" (2026)

Production work

- Elucid - "Mannequins (Dead Fresh)" (2008)
- Nadsroic – Room Mist EP (2009)
- Egyptian Hip Hop – Some Reptiles Grew Wings (2010)
- Kanye West, Big Sean, Pusha T, and 2 Chainz – "Mercy" (2012)
- John Legend and Teyana Taylor – "Bliss" (2012)
- Kanye West, Big Sean, 2 Chainz, Marsha Ambrosius, and Cocaine 80s – "The One" (2012)
- Kanye West and R. Kelly – "To the World" (2012)
- Azealia Banks – "Jumanji" (2012)
- Dominic Lord – "Pierce" (2012)
- Buddy Leezle – "The Luv (Mo Mix)" from The Legend of Buddy Leezle (2013)
- Trek Life & DJ Rhettmatic – "What Is It" from Hometown Heroes Mixtape (2013)
- Kanye West – "I Am a God" and "Blood on the Leaves" from Yeezus (2013)
- Drake – "Connect" from Nothing Was the Same (2013)
- Pusha T – "Hold On" and "No Regrets" from My Name Is My Name (2013)
- Lil Wayne, Nicki Minaj, and Cory Gunz – "Lay It Down" from I Am Not a Human Being II (2013)
- Distantstarr – "Feste" and "Buttafly" from The Vibe (2014)
- Tiombe Lockhart – "Can't Get Enough" (2014)
- Chynna – "MadeInChynna" (2014)
- Selah Sue – "The Light" from Reason (2015)
- Pusha T – "M.F.T.R." from King Push – Darkest Before Dawn: The Prelude (2015)
- A$AP Rocky – "Everyday" from At. Long. Last. ASAP (2015)
- Kanye West – "Famous", "Freestyle 4", "Waves", and "FML" from The Life of Pablo (2016)
- Bodega Bamz – "GHOST" (2016)
- Anohni – Hopelessness (2016)
- Anohni – Paradise (2017)
- Miguel - "Vote" from Crazy Rich Asians: Original Motion Picture Soundtrack (2018)
- Christina Aguilera – "Maria" from Liberation (2018)
- Dawn Richard - "Sauce" from New Breed (2019)
- Banks – "Gimme" and "The Fall" from III (2019)
- Danny L Harle – "Interlocked", "All Night" and "Shining Stars" from Harlecore (2021)
- Mykki Blanco - "Free Ride" from Broken Hearts & Beauty Sleep (2021)
- F5ve – "Firetruck" (2023)
- Kesha – "Living in My Head" and "Peace & Quiet" from Gag Order (2023)
- Travis Scott, SZA, Future - "Telekinesis" from UTOPIA (2023)
- WitchGang (2023-2024)
- Charli XCX – "Talk talk" and "Mean girls" from BRAT (2024)
- Skunk Anansie - "My Greatest Moment" from The Painful Truth (2025)
- Kesha - "Glow" from Period (2025)
- HiTech - "Shadowrealm" (2025) from Honeypaqq Vol. 1 (2025)
- Danny L Harle - "Teardrop In The Ocean" from Cerulean (2026)
- Hyd - "Grounded", "Make Me Believe" and "Never Is Over" from Hold Onto Me Infinity (2026)
- KÁRYYN - Physics Universal Love Language (Pull) (2026)

Remixes

- Lukid – "The Now (Remix by Hudson Mohawke)" from The Now EP (2007)
- Super Smoky Soul – "Geek Beat (Hud Mo Retwirk)" from Cycling EP (2007)
- O Liffey Family – "Rock the Spot: Heralds of Change Redub" (2007)
- Radio Citizen - "The Hop (Hudson Mohawke Mix)" (2007)
- Strand & NonGenetic - "The Chase (Hudson Mohawke Remix)" (2007)
- Ghislain Poirier – "No More Blood (Hudson Mohawke Remix)" (2008)
- Fool – "Seventh (Hudson Mohawke Rmx)" (2008)
- Taz Buckfaster - "Strike First! (Hudson Mohawke Remix)" (2008)
- Crookers – "Put Your Hands on Me (Hudson Mohawke Mix)" (2009)
- Free Moral Agents – "Ageless (Hudson Mohawke Mix)" (2009)
- Dan Deacon – "Woof Woof (Hudson Mohawke Remix)" (2009)
- Machinedrum - "Late Night Operation (Hudson Mohawke Remix)" (2009)
- Uffie – "ADD SUV (Hudson Mohawke's Spam Fajita Remix)" (2010)
- American Men – "AM System (Hudson Mohawke Remix)" (2010)
- De De Mouse – "My Favorite Swing (Hudson Mohawke's Cobra Slice Rework)" from A Journey to Freedom Remixes (2010)
- Krystal Klear – "Tried for Your Love (Hudson Mohawke Remix)" (2010)
- Games – "Strawberry Skies (Hudson Mohawke Remix)" (2010)
- Wiley – "Electric Boogaloo (Hudson Mohawke Remix)" (2010)
- Hot Chip, Bernard Sumner & Hot City - "Didn't Know What Love Was (Hudson Mohawke Remix)" (2010)
- KIMONOS - "No Modern Animal (Remixed By Hudson Mohawke)" (2010)
- Jamie Woon – "Lady Luck (Hudson Mohawke's Schmink Wolf Re-Fix)" (2011)
- B.o.B – "Satellite (Hudson Mohawke Remix)" (2011)
- Gucci Mane – "Party Animal (Hudson Mohawke Remix)" (2011)
- Giacomo Puccini - "O Mio Babbino Caro (Hudson Mohawke Remix)" (2012) for Grand Theft Auto III: 10 Year Anniversary Edition
- Björk – "Virus (Hudson Mohawke Peaches and Guacamol Remix)" from Bastards (2012)
- Battles – "Rolls Bayce (Hudson Mohawke Remix)" from Dross Glop (2012)
- Jackson & His Computer Band – "Vista (Hudson Mohawke Remix)" (2013)
- Disclosure – "White Noise (HudMo Remix)" (2013)
- Paolo Nutini – "Iron Sky (Hudson Mohawke Remix)" (2014)
- Duck Sauce – "NRG (Hudson Mohawke Remix)" (2014)
- Four Tet – "Parallel Jalebi (Hudson Mohawke Remix)" (2014)
- Above & Beyond – "All Over the World (Hudson Mohawke Remix)" (2015)
- Boards of Canada – "Amo Bishop Roden (Hudson Mohawke Remix)" (2016)
- DJ Shadow – "Midnight in a Perfect World (Hudson Mohawke Mix)" (2016)
- Lo Moon – "Loveless (Hudson Mohawke Remix)" (2017)
- Wuh Oh - "Pretty Boy (Hudson Mohawke Remix)" (2019)
- twst - "Are You Listening? (Hudson Mohawke Remix)" (2020)
- Lyra Pramuk - "Tendril (Midnight Peach Rework)" (2021)
- Doss – "Puppy (Feel the Beat Mix)" (2022) (co-remix with Doss)
- Glass Animals - "Helium (Hudson Mohawke Remix)" (2022)
- Crosses - "Procession (Hudson Mohawke Remix)" (2023)
- Salute & Rina Sawayama - "saving flowers (Hudson Mohawke Remix)" (2025)
- Andrew Lloyd Webber - "The Race (Hudson Mohawke Rework)" (2025) from Starlight Express: Deluxe Edition
- Kenshi Yonezu – "KICK BACK (Hudson Mohawke Remix)" (2025)
- Justice - "Mannequin Love (Hudson Mohawke Remix)" (2025)
