= Soleima =

Danish singer-songwriter

- Born: Sarah Mariegaard; December 1988 (age 37); Aarhus, Denmark
- Occupations: Singer; songwriter
- Years active: 2014–present
- Website: soleima.com
- Musical career
- Genres: pop; hip hop
- Instruments: Vocals; piano
- Labels: Parlophone; Big Beat Records

Sarah Mariegaard (born December 1988) known professionally as Soleima, is a Danish singer-songwriter.

== History ==
In 2014, Mariegaard established herself as a solo artist under the name Soleima, before her solo career she was a member of the Danish hip hop collective Flødeklinikken. Her first single "My Boi" was released 14 June 2015. In 2017 her first EP NO. 14 was released following the release of three singles from the album :"Once Was", "Wasted", and "Breathe" (feat. Kranium & Hoodboi). The track "Cracks" from the EP NO. 14 was recognized as P3s Uundgåelige ("P3 Unavoidable"), in the week beginning on 16 January 2017, making it one of the most played songs on the Danish national radio channel P3 that week. Her single "Low Life" from the EP Bulldog was recognized as P3s Uundgåelige ("P3 Unavoidable"), in the week beginning on 15 January 2018. In 2020, her first studio album Powerslide was released and she had her first US tour.

== Discography ==
=== Albums ===
Title	Album details	Track listing	Reviews
Powerslide	Released: 13 March 2020; Label: Big Beat Records; Formats: digital download; Length: 34:37	1. "Roses" - 3:08; 2. "Grind" - 2:44; 3. "LuvULuvULuvU" - 3:55; 4. "Hustlin'" - 2:47; 5. "We're Going Home" - 4:47; 6. "Heartless" - 3:24; 7. "Thing Called Love" - 4:37; 8. "Cheers for the Tears" - 2:55; 9. "Stop" - 2:51; 10. "STFU" - 3:30	Professional ratings Review scores: Source / Rating; Soundvenue / 4/6 stars; Gaffa / 4/6 stars
Powerslide (Deluxe)	Released: 13 March 2020; Label: Big Beat Records; Formats: digital download; Length: 40:18	1. "If The House Is Gonna Burn" - 2:49; 2. "Force Of Nature" - 2:52; 3. "Roses" - 3:08; 4. "Grind" - 2:44; 5. "LuvULuvULuvU" - 3:55; 6. "Hustlin'" - 2:47; 7. "We're Going Home" - 4:47; 8. "Heartless" - 3:24; 9. "Thing Called Love" - 4:37; 10. "Cheers for the Tears" - 2:55; 11. "Stop" - 2:51; 12. "STFU" - 3:30	
Nationens Skrammer	Released: 3 February 2023; Label: Universal Music; Formats: Streaming, Vinyl; Length: 30	1. "Livet Begynder" - 2:53; 2. "Leger Med Ild" - 3:04; 3. "Næste Side" - 3:00; 4. "Kanterne (Feat. Lord Siva)" - 3:04; 5. "På Vej" - 3:38; 6. "Penge På Lommen (feat. Artigeardit)" - 3:34; 7. "Kold Krig / Varm Luft" - 2:54; 8. "Nannas Sang" - 1:04; 9. "Nationens Skrammer" - 3:11; 10. "Vejviser" - 3:42	Professional ratings Review scores: Source / Rating; Soundvenue / 5/6 stars; Gaffa / 4/6 stars

=== Extended plays ===
Title
Album details
Track listing
Reviews
NO. 14
- Released: 21 April 2017
- Label: Parlophone
- Formats: digital download
- Length: 23:13
1. "Cracks" - 3:40
2. "Breathe" - 3:07
3. "My Love" - 3:47
4. "Wasted" - 3:16
5. "Once Was" - 3:14
6. "Mascarade" - 3:20
7. "This Life" - 2:46

Professional ratings
Review scores
Source	Rating
Gaffa	4/6 stars

Bulldog
- Released: 6 April 2018
- Label: Big Beat Records
- Formats: digital download
- Length: 13:44
1. "Pacify Me" - 2:56
2. "Low Life" - 2:59
3. "Bulldog" - 3:20
4. "Waterloo Skit" - 0:44
5. "Friend" - 3:42

Professional ratings
Review scores
Source	Rating
Soundvenue	3/6 stars
Gaffa	5/6 stars

== Awards and nominations ==
=== Årets Steppeulv Awards ===
Year	Category	Work	Outcome	Ref.
2018	Song of the Year	"Breathe" (feat. Kranium og Hoodboi)	Nominated	

=== MTV Europe Music Awards ===
Year	Category	Outcome	Ref.
2018	Best Danish Act	Nominated	

=== P3 Guld Awards ===
Year	Category	Outcome	Ref.
2017	P3 Talent of the Year	Won	

=== Danish Music Awards ===
Year	Category	Outcome	Ref.
2017	New Danish Name of the Year	Nominated	

=== GAFFA-Prisen Awards ===
Year	Category	Outcome	Ref.
2017	New Danish Name of the Year	Nominated	
