= Lunice =

Canadian DJ and producer (born 1988)

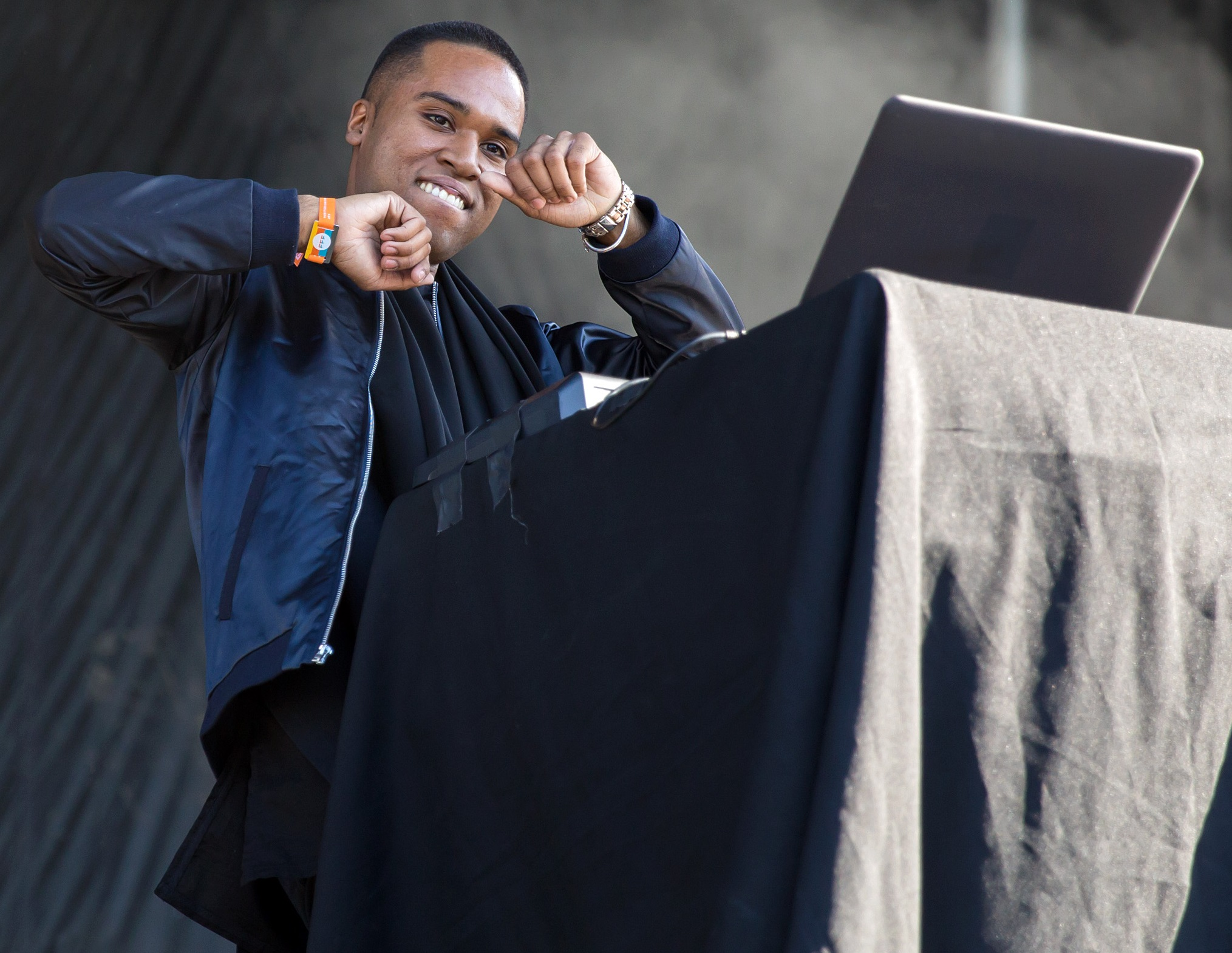
- Lunice performing in 2014

Background information
- Born: Lunice Fermin Pierre II; May 15, 1988 (age 38); Montreal, Quebec, Canada
- Genres: Electronic; hip hop
- Occupations: Record producer; disc jockey
- Years active: 2007–present
- Label: LuckyMe
- Member of: TNGHT
- Website: lunice.luckyme.net

Lunice Fermin Pierre II (born May 15, 1988), better known by his mononymous stage name Lunice, is a Canadian record producer and DJ from Montreal. He is one half of the duo TNGHT along with Hudson Mohawke.

== Biography ==
Lunice is the son of a Filipino mother and a Haitian father.

Lunice started as a b-boy, dancing competitively for the 701 Squad. In the early 2000s, he was inspired to make his own music after hearing how producer 9th Wonder constructed beats on the computer program Fruity Loops.

In 2007, Lunice played his first gig at Hovatron's monthly Bass Culture in Montréal, where he met Sixtoo, and was invited to perform at the Megasoid parties. He has been a part of the Turbo Crunk crew ever since.

In 2008, Lunice released a video for Lazersword's "Gucci Sweatshirt". In 2010, he participated in the London installment of the Red Bull Music Academy. Also in the same year, Lunice performed at the Sonar Music Festival.

Lunice signed to LuckyMe for the release of two EPs, Stacker Upper (2010) and One Hunned (2011), and soon connected with producer Diplo and his Mad Decent label for a remix of Deerhunter's "Helicopter", which led to further collaborations on remixes, mixes for the likes of BBC Radio 1, and performances with the Mad Decent Block Party. In 2011, Lunice collaborated with Azealia Banks and was featured in her video for the song "212".

Since then, he has done work with such labels as XL Recordings, Warner Bros. Records, Palms Out Sounds, Young Turks, Big Dada, and Top Billin'. Throughout 2010 and 2011, Lunice toured internationally.

Lunice and Hudson Mohawke formed the group TNGHT, for the 2012 release of an EP on Warp and LuckyMe, following a successful headlining Warp's SXSW showcase earlier in the year. The duo met in 2008, when Lunice booked Hudson Mohawke to perform at one of his Turbo Crunk parties.

In 2017, Lunice released his debut solo studio album, CCCLX. In that year, he also released a collaborative EP with The Alchemist, titled Moving Parts.

== Discography ==
=== Studio albums ===
- CCCLX (2017)
- Open (2023)

=== EPs ===
- Stacker Upper (2010)
- One Hunned (2011)
- 180 (2015)
- Moving Parts (2017) (with The Alchemist)

=== Singles ===
- "Out of Touch" (2009)
- "Bus Stop Jazz" (2011) (with The Jealous Guys)
- "Can't Wait To" (2014)
- "Partout" (2018)
- "Run Around" (2021)

=== Productions ===
- ST 2 Lettaz and DaVinci – "Get Her High" (2011)
- Azealia Banks – "Runnin'" from Fantasea (2012)
- Deniro Farrar and Shady Blaze – "All I Know" from Kill or Be Killed (2012)
- Rockie Fresh – "Superman OG" from Electric Highway (2013)
- Rockie Fresh – "Panera Bread" from The Birthday Tape (2013)
- Rockie Fresh and Casey Veggies – "Fresh Veggies" from Fresh Veggies (2013)
- Rockie Fresh – "Headquarters Freestyle" (2013)
- Deniro Farrar – "Burning Bills" from Rebirth (2014)
- Le1f – "Umami/Water" from Riot Boi (2015)
- Azealia Banks – "Crown" from Slay-Z (re-release edition) (2017)

=== Remixes ===
- Matt B – "Cars Go Boom (Lunice Remix)" (2009)
- Xrabit & DMG$ – "Damaged Goods (Lunice Remix)" (2009)
- Thunderheist – "L.B.G. (Lunice Remix)" (2009)
- The XX – "Basic Space (Lunice Remix)" (2009)
- Hovatron – "Gold Star Radiation (Lunice Remix)" (2009)
- Diamond K – "Handz in the Air (Lunice Remix)" (2009)
- Mexicans with Guns – "Sell Your Soul (Lunice Remix)" (2010)
- Ryan Leslie – "Addiction (Lunice Remix)" (2010)
- Deerhunter – "Helicopter (Diplo & Lunice Remix)" (2010)
- Invent & OSTR – "Hey You (Lunice Remix)" (2010)
- Radio Radio – "EJ Savais Pas Mieux (Lunice Remix)" (2010)
- Elephant Man – "Shake It (Lunice Remix)" (2010)
- The Touch – "All I Find (Lunice Remix)" (2011)
- XV – "Swervin' (Lunice Remix)" (2011)
- Theophilus London – "W.E.T. (Lunice Remix)" (2011)
- Foster the People – "Pumped Up Kicks (Lunice Remix)" (2011)
- Flosstradamus – "From the Back (Lunice Remix)" (2012)
- G Jones & Bleep Bloop – "Mind (Lunice Remix)" (2015)
- Afrika Bambaataa & The Soulsonic Force – "Planet Rock (Lunice Remix)" (2016)
- Joji – "Demons (Lunice Remix)" (2018)
- Django Django – "Surface to Air (Lunice Remix)" (2018)
- Donna Missal – "Jupiter (Lunice Remix)" (2019)
- Underscores — "Tongue in cheek (Lunice Version)" (2022)
- Umru & Petal Supply ft. Rebecca Black – "heart2 (Lunice Remix)" (2022)
