= LuckyMe (record label) =

British record label and design studio

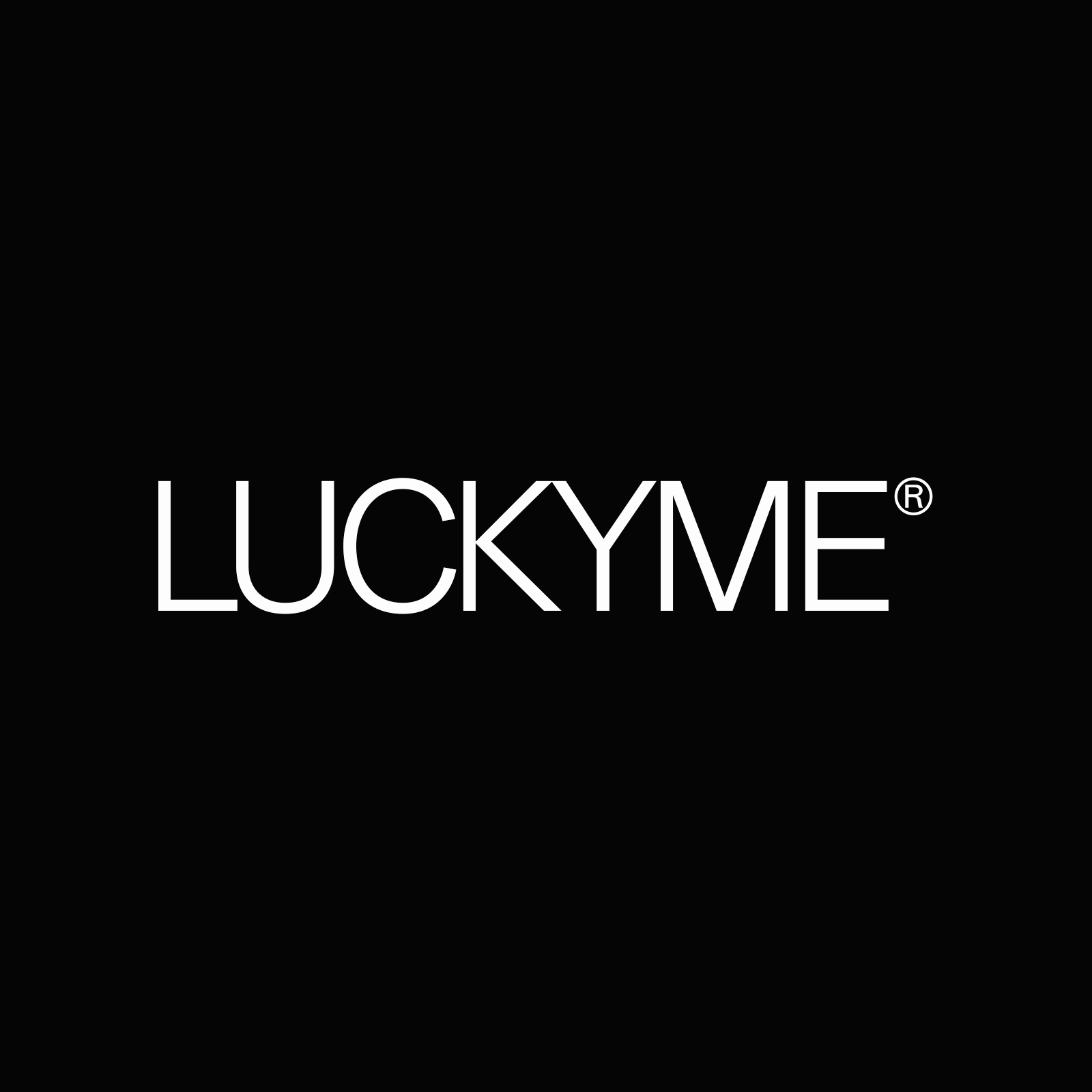
- Founded: 7 July 2007
- Founder: Dominic Flannigan; Martyn Flyn; Ross Birchard; Mike Slott
- Distributor: Warp
- Genre: Various
- Country of origin: Scotland
- Location: London, UK
- Official website: luckyme.net

LuckyMe is a United Kingdom–based record label and design studio specialising in the release of new electronic, hip-hop, pop, rock and underground dance music. Referred to as "one of the most innovative and prolific independent record labels of the decade" and acclaimed for "distinctive visual arts projects and collaborations".

== History ==
=== 2007–2008 ===
The label was founded in Glasgow, Scotland, on 7 July 2007, by Dominic Sum Flannigan; Martyn Flyn; Mike Slott and Ross Birchard, also known as Warp Records recording artist Hudson Mohawke. LuckyMe incorporated producers, rappers and designers, reflecting Flannigan's Art school training. 'We're essentially a record label... but we also function as a design consultancy too. Most of the work we do at the moment is self-originated, though, and that involves all of our record sleeves and flyers.'

As well as operating as a design studio and label, LuckyMe began to co-run a series of music events in Glasgow called Ballers Social Club at which many of the label's artists performed as residents, and the visual aspects of the night – identity, visual installations and flyer art – were undertaken by the design studio. A short run of club nights – LuckyMe: Drums – were run in 2007 at Edinburgh's Octopus Diamond, at the launch 100 CD-Rs were given out entitled Hudson Mohawke – Drums Vol. One. At these events Flannigan and Flyn first met Rustie, Tom Trago, Linkwood & Eclair Fifi. The first LuckyMe Edinburgh Festival Party was launched in 2008.

In 2008, LuckyMe's first record was pressed and released alongside Wireblock – a limited edition white label, Hudson Mohawke's first release Ooops!.

=== 2009–2011 ===
The New Yorker praised LuckyMe as one of their favourite sites of 2009. The 2nd Annual Edinburgh Festival Party was held at Electric Circus with a visual installation by Pageant.

In June 2010, Sónar festival in Barcelona invited LuckyMe to curate three hours on stage at Sonar By Night, in which Hudson Mohawke, Eclair Fifi, Lunice, Machinedrum, The Blessings and AmericanMen performed live, hosted by Olivier Daysoul with visuals by Dominic Flannigan. The label was also invited to New York City to showcase the label's music at a collaborative event with Goodpeoples in which Hudson Mohawke, Rustie, Mike Slott, The Blessings, Machinedrum, Eclair Fifi, Cubic Zirconia, Azealia Banks, Jacques Greene and Lunice played.

As part of Edinburgh Festival Mike Slott performed a live film score at a screening of Andrei Zvyagintsev's The Return. LuckyMe released records by Jacques Greene, Lunice and Machinedrum and performed at an RBMA Culture Clash in Toronto, Ontario. In a late 2011 review of Ango's Another City Now (released on LuckyMe in 2012) Boiler Room wrote 'if you can think of a label that's been quite as 'on point' musically and visually, as LuckyMe over the last few years, then you're a brilliant thinker. Seriously..'

=== 2012–2013 ===
TNGHT, the collaborative project between Lunice and Hudson Mohawke released their official debut – TNGHT EP through LuckyMe with Warp. On 30 November 2012 TNGHT performed at Brooklyn's Music Hall of Williamsburg, which featured an appearance by rapper/producer Kanye West during a remix of West's "Cold". The duo co-produced Kanye West's song Blood on the Leaves from his critically acclaimed album Yeezus. The song samples TNGHT's track R U Ready.

S-Type toured alongside AlunaGeorge and was given Best New Track by Pitchfork in October for the title song from the Billboard EP. Machinedrum's Van Vogue from the SXLND EP was used by Azealia Banks for her single 1991. Hudson Mohawke was commissioned for an official remix of Björk. LuckyMe were in Fact's 10 Best Labels of 2012, the magazine complimented the 'website, essential mix series and inspired giveaways', referring to S-Type's Billboard and Machinedrums SXLND as essential releases. The mixtape series launched officially on iTunes as a podcast. Eclair Fifi began a residency on British national station BBC Radio 1.

The label started a 6-part series of mix shows on Mista Jam's Daily Dose Show on BBC Radio 1Xtra, Lunice hosted the first show followed by Ango, Eclair Fifi, The Blessings, Obey City and S-Type. Rinse FM invited LuckyMe to start a bi-weekly show, which featured The Blessings, Eclair Fifi, Obey City and Joseph Marinetti. The Yolo Bear EP was released and launched over 3 cities on the same night with DJ Yolo Bear "performing" in New York, London and Edinburgh.

=== 2014 ===
LuckyMe were referred to as defining the sound of 2014 along with other British labels "carrying the torch lit by legendary British independents such as Rough Trade, Warp and Domino." by The Guardian The label's producers formed a stronger relationship with pop music as new signing Cashmere Cat released music with Ariana Grande, Ludacris, Tinashe and Charli XCX amongst others. The label and studio were given creative freedom on the Boiler Room launch of Hudson Mohawke's Chimes in Los Angeles. Director Dominic Flannigan curated an indulgent set of performances which featured costume design by Tirsh Hunter (known for her work on Björk's Wunderlust video) and sets by Flying Lotus and Lunice.

The label co-curated a SXSW event with Warp at which a number of its roster performed, as well as a showcase at Miami Winter Music Conference with performances by Cashmere Cat, Jacques Greene, Obey City and Joseph Marinetti. The label's artists also performed at MoMA PS1 warm-up in New York and main stages at Field Day festival in London. Eclair Fifi starred in a campaign as an artist and model for H&M.

LuckyMe released Claude Speeed's debut album My Skeleton. The studio produced videos for new releases by Cashmere Cat, Lunice, Rustie and Joseph Marinetti, and the label released records by Jacques Greene, Tim Vocals, S-Type, Sevendeaths and Baauer.

S-Type and Hudson Mohawke produced The Rap Monument – one of the longest rap songs of all time, wherein 36 rappers were recorded by Nick Hook over a 42-minute composition by S-Type in studios across several different cities.

=== 2015 ===
Edinburgh-based band Naked were signed by LuckyMe and released their debut EP Youth Mode. The label also released a single by new-signing Littlebabyangel with an interactive website and Merlot Sounds by Obey City, the follow-up to his debut EP Champagne Sounds. Eclair Fifi & Joseph Marinetti toured Europe. S-Type scored an exclusive soundtrack for Astrid Andersen's New York Fashion Week '15 catwalk show and released an EP of collaborations entitled SV8.

Hudson Mohawke announced his second album Lantern and was referred to by The Guardian as 'one of the biggest producers in the world'. Mohawke headlined Fader Fort at SXSW with guests Travis Scott and Twista. In 2015, LuckyMe penned a global distribution deal with Warp Records in order to release album projects and sign long-term deals with their roster.

=== 2016 ===
The first LuckyMe album campaign was for Baauer's debut "Aa". The record was announced on The Late Show with Stephen Colbert on 27 January 2016 alongside a performance of the single "Day Ones" with Leikeli47. The album featured Future, G-Dragon, Leikeli47, M.I.A., Novelist, Pusha T, Rustie, Tirzah and TT the Artist. Music video directors and animators who contributed to the album include Hiro Murai, Thomas Rhazi, Jesse Kanda, Nic Hamilton and frequent collaborator Jonathan Zawada. 'Aa' was released on 18 March 2016 and was awarded Triple J Feature Record, charting at number 52 in the Australian Albums (ARIA) chart; as well as in Billboard's Top Dance / Electronic Albums (3), and US Heatseekers Albums (11). The album was awarded one of Complex 50 Best Albums of The Year, and Billboard's 10 Best Dance / Electronic Albums of 2016. 'Aa' soundtracked Budweiser's Super Bowl Campaign, four campaigns for Nike including The Switch with Cristiano Ronaldo and has since featured in major motion pictures Logan and Red Sparrow. 'Aa' was used as the soundtrack to Alexander Wang's A/W show and Baauer was invited to model for the brand. In 2016 LuckyMe also released NAKED's debut album, 'Zone' – launching the album with a performance at St John of Hackney alongside Merzbow and Thurston Moore. Also in 2016, LuckyMe released Jacques Greene 12" Afterglow / You Can't Deny, and a re-issue of a classic Chicago House / Freestyle record "Never Let Go" by Mickey Oliver & Shanna Jae. The release was selected by Eclair Fifi who often played the song out in her DJ sets. LuckyMe also released an EP called 'Secret Palace' from Glasgow-based grime producer Inkke.

=== 2017 ===
In 2017 LuckyMe released six full length projects by Lunice, Cid Rim, Sevendeaths, Sam O.B. Joseph Marinetti and notably "Feel Infinite" – the debut album by Jacques Greene. The album received strong critical acclaim upon release with The Wire magazine stating "Greene's invention consistently sparkles and startles", Clash Magazine wrote "Working on something innately cerebral and wholly physical, genre-less and a style of its own, Jacques Greene never fails to surprise". Pitchfork described the release "his long-overdue love letter to the dance floor". The original artwork for the release by Mathieu Fortin and Hassan Rahim was appropriated for a range of brands including Dior Homme, JD Sports, Infinite Archives & Nick Jonas. Jacques Greene launched the album via performances at Sonar Festival in Barcelona, a curated line up at Electric Brixton in London, including Lone, Pional, Eclair Fifi and Yves Tumor, and in his home town of Montreal, Greene took over the derelict public bathhouse, Bain Mathieu, with a unique AV show created by artists Adam Humell and Melissa Matos.

=== 2018 ===
In 2018 LuckyMe released a triptych of Baauer singles which saw the producer collaborate with AJ Tracey, Jae Stephens, Soleima and cyber it-girl Miquela Sousa. "Hate Me ft Miquela" was featured on Spotify's Times Square Billboard and Miquela featured on the covers of 032C, King Kong, Metro, High Snobiety. The video for 'Company' by Baauer ft Soleima was directed by Jonathan Zawada and was premiered by Pitchfork. The video depicts machines attempting to use phones and prosthetics to simulate human connection.

On 1 April LuckyMe released the debut studio album by Montreal-based singer and songwriter Stephan Armstrong aka Littlebabyangel. At this point the album was not a commercial release, but rather a private chain letter sent to the label's mailing list on an open link. Users were asked to spread the word and forward mails to friends. The record was finally released on all formats on Halloween 2018. In a new precedent for the site, Pitchfork reviewed the mixtape while still a private link, and called GADA "...a daring, eclectic mix of experimental R&B...", stating "...he won't stay a secret for long."

On 6 July LuckyMe released the first studio album by New Orleans–based James Richard Prudhomme aka Suicideyear. Titled "Colour The Weather" – the release explored themes of family, nostalgia and alienation. Singles included 'Tired' and "Days Forever featuring Georgia Barnes". The album art saw a collaboration between friends Ezra Miller & Mickey Joyce who together with Prudhomme produced impressionistic generative collages from locations around Baton Rouge and New Orleans.

On 15 November LuckyMe released the Fever Focus EP by Jacques Greene. The six track project was designed by New York–based illustrator Bráulio Amado. The music on the EP first premiered in a short run cassette release exclusive to bandcamp and was accompanied by a long form art film parody which showed Greene browsing the Internet for the duration of the tape: his face subtly reflected in the screen while moving between browser windows. The mixtape was reviewed by Pitchfork who said "It's a delight to know that Aubin-Dionne's next phase won't sacrifice his knack for melodrama, but even more exciting to glimpse the new depths ahead." Fever Focus was the final project started on the tape, with six tracks spread across two separate single vinyl, mastered and cut to vinyl in dance format – A side at 45 rpm, B side at 33.3 rpm- by mastering engineer Matt Colton. On digital streaming platforms the release was handled as a series of six consecutively revealed digital singles, each accompanied by a visualiser film on YouTube.

== LuckyMe Studio ==
In addition to releasing music, LuckyMe operates as a visual art studio staffed by former Glasgow School of Art students. As a studio, LuckyMe has undertaken design work in the fashion and music industries, completing print, film, public events, websites, and sculptural projects.

=== 2011 ===
LuckyMe launched an augmented reality project for Becks in several sites including Shoreditch in East London, where viewers could listen to LuckyMe's artists' music by walking round a green box, 2.5-metre 3D eyeballs appeared to float in the street, changing as the viewer moved, each eyeball visually represented different artists music. Photographer Christina Kernohan exhibited her work in a solo exhibition Gammel Butikken in the Stockbridge area of Edinburgh as part of Edinburgh Festival and has shot official press photography for Chvrches, Theophilus London and Optimo.

=== 2012 ===
LuckyMe worked alongside Mathew Williams, Virgil Abloh, Es Devlin and Kanye West on the creative-direction and marketing of the album Yeezus.

=== 2013 ===
The design studio received acclaim for the album artwork and website for Machinedrum's Ninja Tune release Vapor City, illustrated by Eclair Fifi and designed by Dominic Flannigan. The design was featured as part of the Record Sleeves of the month piece in Creative Review.

=== 2014 ===
LuckyMe in-house director Peter Marsden was praised across several press platforms for his work on videos for Rustie ft. Danny Brown Attak, Cashmere Cat Wedding Bells and Lunice Can't Wait To.

=== 2015 ===
LuckyMe produced a series of music videos for the fledgling Apple Music for Baauer's Aa album. The series of four films were directed by LuckyMe Studio, Nic Hamilton, Thomas Rhazi and Atlanta (TV series) creator Hiro Murai. The films were consequently used as backdrops to Baauer's live TV performance on The Late Show with Stephen Colbert.

=== 2016 ===
Peter Marsden wrote and directed his debut short-film, Not Required Back. The film was part of the official selection for BFI London Film Festival, London Short Film Festival, Scottish Mental Health Film Festival, British Shorts in Berlin and Glasgow Short Film Festival. The film was said to be "captivating, haunting - transporting..." by Eye on Film who went on to write "the decline of an industry made littoral, beached and decaying... in the competitive film of short film, Not Required Back should be a winner".

=== 2017 ===
LuckyMe released a series of four short music videos for Apple Music, branded EXPO. The series was directed throughout by the in house creative team for their artists, Jacques Greene, Lunice, Suicideyear & CID RIM. Shot in Montreal, New Orleans, Vienna, Berlin & London – the series received a staff pick award at Vimeo. LuckyMe Studio also aided the release of Gorillaz Humanz album, with art direction, animation, layout and graphic design in assistance to illustrator Jamie Hewlett. The studio also created a multi-media sculptural installation for Jacques Greene entitled Real Time: which saw a looping, dub plate vinyl record slowly erode over live stream over a course of weeks running into the Feel Infinite album release.

== Discography ==
=== Releases ===
- Hudson Mohawke – Says Oops! EP, 12" (June 2008)
- Nadsroic – Room Mist EP, 12", Digital (July 2009)
- Mike Slott – Lucky 9Teen LP, 12", Digital (October 2009)
- American Men – Cool World 2LP, Gatefold 12", Digital (July 2010)
- Machinedrum – Many Faces EP, 12", Digital (August 2010)
- TStewart – The Image Generation Album, Cassette, Digital (September 2010)
- Lunice – Stacker Upper EP, 12", Digital (November 2010)
- Jacques Greene – The Look EP, 12", Digital (November 2010)
- Jacques Greene – Another Girl Single, 12", Digital (February 2011)
- Lunice – One Hunned EP, 12", Digital (August 2011)
- Ango – Another City Now EP, 12", Digital (November 2011)
- Machinedrum – SXLND EP, 12", Digital (2011)
- TNGHT – TNGHT EP, 12", Digital (July 2012)
- Cid Rim – Cid Rim Album, Digital (August 2012)
- S-Type – Billboard EP, 12", Digital (October 2012)
- TNGHT – ACRYLICS Single, Digital(April 2013)
- Jacques Greene – On Your Side EP, 12", Digital (August 2013)
- Obey City – Champagne Sounds EP, 12", Digital (August 2013)
- Cid Rim – Mute City EP, 12", Digital (September 2013)
- Joseph Marinetti – SWM Single, Digital (November 2013)
- Sevendeaths – Concreté Misery Album, Screen Print Music Bundle, Digital (January 2014)
- Cashmere Cat – Wedding Bells EP, 12", Digital (February 2014)
- Jacques Greene – Phantom Vibrate EP, 12", Digital (April 2014)
- Jacques Greene – Phantom Vibrate Remixes EP, Digital (May 2014)
- S-Type – Rosario EP, 12", Digital (June 2014)
- Tim Vocals – Look Both Ways Single, Digital (June 2014)
- Baauer – Clang Single, Digital (July 2014)
- Claude Speeed – My Skeleton Album, CD, Digital (July 2014)
- Lunice – Can't Wait To Single, Digital (July 2014)
- Baauer – ß EP, Digital (November 2014)
- Joseph Marinetti – PDA EP, 12", Digital (November 2014)
- Jacques Greene – After Life After Party EP, Digital (November 2014)
- Obey City – Merlot Sounds EP, 12", Digital (February 2015)
- S-Type -SV8 EP Digital (February 2015)
- Littlebabyangel – @Cartier Single, Digital (April 2015)
- NAKED – Youth Mode EP, 12", Digital (May 2015)
- Inkke – Secret Palace EP, Vinyl and Zine Bundle (July 2016)
- Baauer – Aa Album, CD, Vinyl, Digital (March 2016)
- Eclair Fifi – Mickey Oliver & Shanna Jae – Never Let Go EP, 12" Digital (July 2016)
- NAKED – Zone Album, CD, Vinyl, Digital (September 2016)
- Jacques Greene – Afterglow / You Can't Deny EP, 12", Digital (October 2016)
- Sevendeaths – Remote Sympathy Album, CD, Vinyl, Digital (February 2017)
- Jacques Greene – Feel Infinite LP, 12", Digital (March 2017)
- Joseph Marinetti – Amusement Equals Apathy Mixtape, Digital (April 2017)
- Suicideyear – Hate Songs EP, Vinyl, Digital (July 2017)
- Sam O.B – Positive Noise Album, CD, Vinyl, Digital (August 2017)
- Lunice – CCCLX Album, CD, Vinyl, Digital (September 2017)
- Cid Rim – Material Album, CD, Vinyl, Digital (October 2017)
- Lunice and Alchemist – Moving Parts Album, Digital (November 2017)
- Steven Julien – Bloodline Album, Digital (April 2018)
- Jaques Greene – Mixtape Mixtape, Cassette (April 2018)
- S-Type –- OS-T Mixtape, Digital (May 2018)
- Suicideyear and Yung Lean – Spider Feet Single, Digital (May 2018)
- Suicideyear – Color The Weather Album, CD, Vinyl, Digital (July 2018)
- Inkke – Lil Plasma EP, Digital (July 2018)
- Baauer and AJ Tracey and Jae Stephens – 3AM Single, Digital (July 2018)
- S-Type & Young Thug – Tellin Em Single, Digital (July 2018)
- Sam O.B. – Positive Noise Remixes EP, Digital (August 2018)
- Littlebabyangel – GADA Mixtape, Digital, Vinyl (October 2018)
- Baauer and Soleima – Company Single, Digital (October 2018)
- Denzel Himself – Be There / Higher Single, Digital (October 2018)
- CD-RM – CD_RM_1 Double Single, Digital (October 2018)
- Jacques Greene – Fever Focus EP, Digital, Double 12" (November 2018)
- CID RIM and Denai Moore – Control Single, Digital (November 2018)
- Sam O.B, – Don't Stop Single, Digital (November 2018)
- Sevendeaths – FT4C EP, Digital (November 2018)
- Nosaj Thing – No Mind EP, Digital (October 2020)
- Kučka – Wrestling Album, CD, Vinyl, Digital (April 2021)
- Doss – 4 New Hit Songs EP, Digital (May 2021)
- Eli Keszler – Icons Album, CD, Vinyl, Candle, Digital (June 2021)
- Kučka – Beautiful Single, Digital (July 2021)
- Cid Rim – Songs of Vienna Album, CD, Vinyl, Digital (October 2021)
- Jacques Greene – ANTH01 Album, Digital, Double 12, Double CD" (October 2021)
- TNGHT Tums Single, Digital (November 2021)
- Nosaj Thing – No Mind <expanded> EP, Digital (November 2021)
- Eli Keszler – Icons+ Digital (November 2021)
- Jacques Greene – Fantasy EP, Digital, Vinyl (January 2022)
- Eli Keszler – The Vaulting Sky Single, Digital (March 2022)
- Cid Rim – Songs For Vienna EP, Digital (March 2022)
- S-Type – Be Where You Are Single, Digital (April 2022)
- Omega Sapien – Wuga EP, Digital (May 2022)
- Cid Rim – Paul's (CD_RM Extended Edit) Single, Digital (May 2022)
- Jacques Greene – Relay Single, Digital, Vinyl (June 2022)
- Kučka – Messed Up Single, Digital (July 2022)
- S-Type ft Martyn Bootyspoon – Drip Single, Digital (July 2022)
- Baauer – Let Me Love U Single, Digital (August 2022)
- Iglooghost – Tidal Memory Exo Album, Digital (May 2024)

=== White label series ===
- Machinedrum – Alarma LMW001, 12" (2011)
- Baauer – Dum Dum LMW002, 12" (September 2012)
- Yolo Bear – Yolo Bear EP LMW003, 12" (October 2013)
- DJ Paypal – Buy Now LMW004, 12" (February 2015)
- Bwana – Capsule's Pride LMW006 12"(July 2016)

=== Digital compilations ===
- Various – LuckyMe Advent Calendar 11 (December 2011)
- Various – LuckyMe Advent Calendar 12 (December 2012)
- Various – LuckyMe Advent Calendar 13 (December 2013)
- Various – LuckyMe Advent Calendar 14 (December 2014)
- Various – LuckyMe Advent Calendar 15 (December 2015)
- Various – LuckyMe Advent Calendar 16 (December 2016)
- Various – LuckyMe Advent Calendar 17 (December 2017)
- Various – LuckyMe Advent Calendar 18 (December 2018)
- Various – LuckyMe Advent Calendar 20 (December 2020)
- Various – LuckyMe Advent Calendar 21 (December 2021)

== Roster ==
=== Music ===
- American Men
- Ango
- Baauer
- The Blessings
- Cashmere Cat
- CID RIM aka CD_RM
- Claude Speeed
- Denzel Himself
- DJ Paypal
- Doss
- Eclair Fifi
- Hudson Mohawke
- Jacques Greene
- Joseph Marinetti
- Kučka
- Littlebabyangel
- Lunice
- Machinedrum
- Mike Slott
- Nadsroic
- NAKED
- Nosaj Thing
- Obey City aka Sam O.B.
- Parc En Ciel
- Rustie
- Sevendeaths
- S-Type
- TNGHT

=== Art ===
- Dominic Sum Flannigan
- Christina Kernohan
- Konx-om-Pax
- Peter Marsden
- Eclair Fifi
- Mauries Matos
- Hiro Murai
- Virgil Abloh
- Thomas Rhazi
- Shaniqwa Jarvis
- Jonathan Zawada
- Ezra Miller
- Emir Eralp
- Morey Talmor
- Harry Mcnally
- Konx Om Pax
- Mathieu Fortin
- Til Weideck
- Teddy Fitzhugh
- Nic Hamilton
- Jase Coop
- Astrid Anderson
- Daniel Swan
- Sam Rolfes
- Tim Saccenti
- Braulio Amado
- Eric Hu
- Hassan Rahim
