= AlunaGeorge discography =

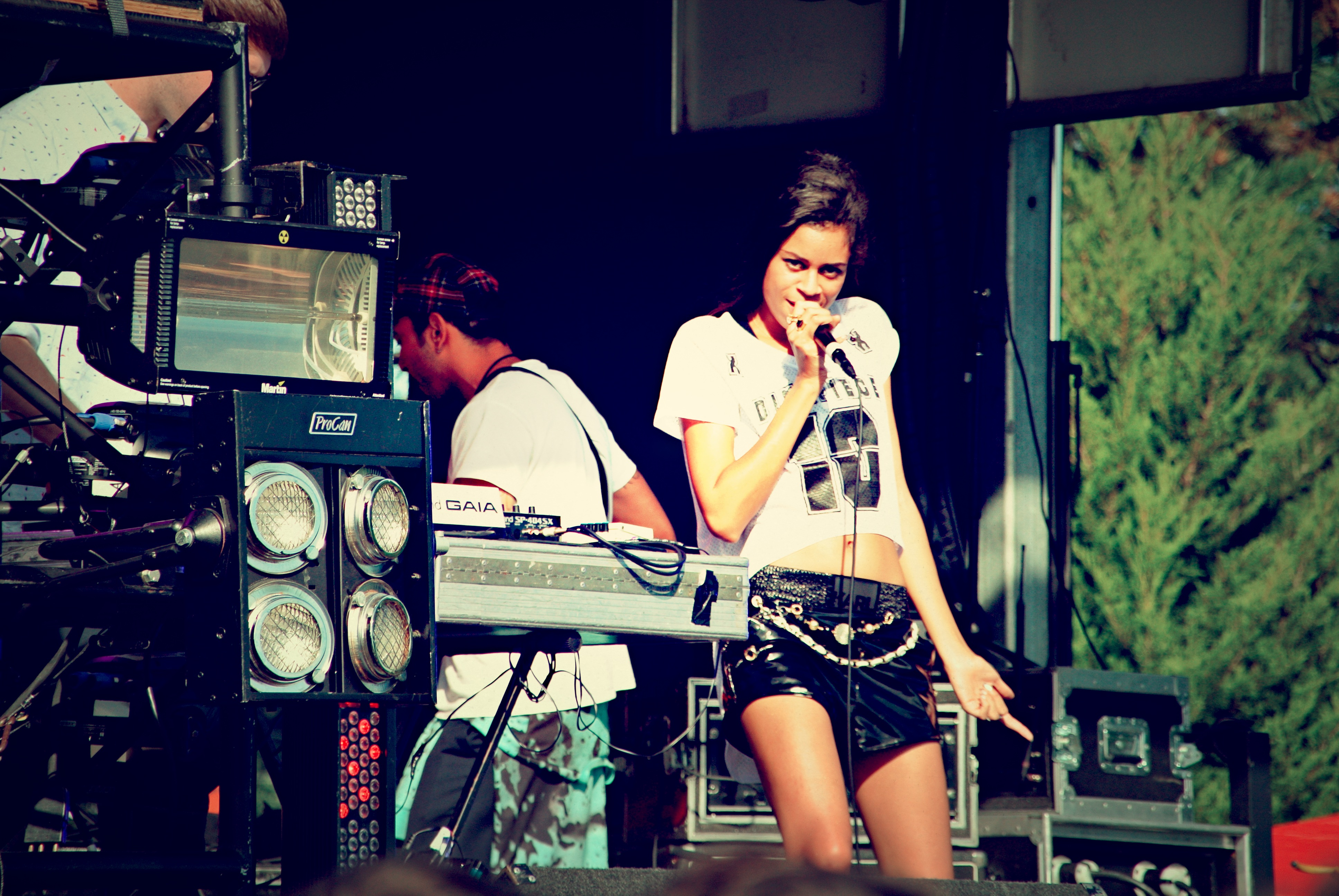
- Studio albums: 2
- EPs: 2
- Singles: 29
- Music videos: 16

English electronic music duo AlunaGeorge have released two studio albums, one extended play, twenty-nine singles (including 10 as a featured artist) and sixteen music videos.

== Albums ==
=== Studio albums ===
Title	Details	Peak chart positions								
Title	Details	UK	AUS	BEL (FL)	BEL (WA)	FRA	IRE	NL	SWI	US Heat.
Body Music	Released: 26 July 2013; Label: Island; Formats: CD, LP, digital download	11	71	80	43	82	43	96	81	2
I Remember	Released: 16 September 2016; Label: Island; Formats: CD, LP, digital download	71	56	169	—	146	—	131	—	15
"—" denotes a recording that did not chart.

=== Remix album ===
Title	Details
Body Music Remixed	Released: 16 June 2014; Label: Island; Format: Digital download

== Extended plays ==
Title	Details
You Know You Like It EP	Released: 11 June 2012; Label: Tri Angle; Formats: 12", digital download
Champagne Eyes	Released: 5 October 2018; Label: Self-released; Formats: Digital download

== Singles ==
=== As lead artist ===
List of singles with selected chart positions and certifications, showing album name and year released
Title	Year	Peak chart positions										Certifications	Album
Title	Year	UK	AUS	BEL (WA)	DEN	FRA	IRE	NL	NZ	US	US Dance	Certifications	Album
"Analyser" / "We Are Chosen"	2011	—	—	—	—	—	—	—	—	—	—		Non-album single
"You Know You Like It"	2012	39	—	— (Note: "You Know You Like It" did not enter the Ultratop 50, but peaked at number 36 on the Walloon Ultratip chart.)	—	—	—	—	—	—	30	BPI: Silver	Body Music
"Your Drums, Your Love"	2012	50	—	— (Note: "Your Drums, Your Love" did not enter the Ultratop 50, but peaked at number 21 on the Walloon Ultratip chart.)	—	—	—	—	—	—	—		Body Music
"Attracting Flies"	2013	17	—	— (Note: "Attracting Flies" did not enter the Ultratop 50, but peaked at number 30 on the Walloon Ultratip chart.)	—	—	—	—	—	—	—	BPI: Silver	Body Music
"Best Be Believing"	2013	—	—	—	—	—	—	—	—	—	—	BPI: Silver	Body Music
"Supernatural"	2014	—	—	—	—	—	—	—	—	—	—		Non-album singles
"You Know You Like It" (with DJ Snake)	2015	67	11	19	—	22	73	23	21	13	2	BPI: Gold; ARIA: 5× Platinum; BEA: Gold; IFPI DEN: Gold; RIAA: 3× Platinum; RMNZ: 3× Platinum	Non-album singles
"Automatic" (with Zhu)	2015	—	97	—	—	—	—	—	—	—	19		Genesis Series
"I'm in Control" (featuring Popcaan)	2016	39	64	32	32	57	60	50	—	—	18	BPI: Silver; IFPI DEN: Gold; RMNZ: Gold	I Remember
"I Remember"	2016	182	84	—	—	—	—	—	—	—	22		I Remember
"My Blood" (featuring Zhu)	2016	—	—	—	—	—	—	—	—	—	45		I Remember
"Mean What I Mean" (featuring Leikeli47 and Dreezy)	2016	—	—	—	—	—	—	—	—	—	—		I Remember
"Mediator"	2016	—	—	—	—	—	—	—	—	—	—		I Remember
"Not Above Love"	2017	—	—	—	—	—	—	—	—	—	37		I Remember
"Fake Magic" (with Peking Duk)	2017	—	34	—	—	—	—	—	—	—	—	ARIA: 3× Platinum; RMNZ: Platinum	Non-album singles
"Last Kiss"	2017	—	—	—	—	—	—	—	—	—	—		Non-album singles
"Turn Up the Love"	2017	—	—	—	—	—	—	—	—	—	—		Non-album singles
"Superior Emotion" (featuring Cautious Clay)	2018	—	—	—	—	—	—	—	—	—	—		Champagne Eyes
"Lovers Table" (with Kleerup)	2019	—	—	—	—	—	—	—	—	—	—		2
"Baggage" (with Gryffin and Gorgon City)	2019	—	—	—	—	—	—	—	—	—	32		Gravity
"Nice Things" (with Far East Movement and Henry)	2020	—	—	—	—	—	—	—	—	—	—		Non-album single
"—" denotes a recording that did not chart or was not released in that territory.

=== As featured artist ===
List of singles with selected chart positions and certifications, showing album name and year released
Title	Year	Peak chart positions					Certifications	Album
Title	Year	UK	AUS	BEL (FL)	IRE	US Dance	Certifications	Album
"After Light" (Rustie featuring AlunaGeorge)	2012	173	—	— (Note: "After Light" did not enter the Ultratop 50, but peaked at number 44 on the Flemish Ultratip chart.)	—	—		Glass Swords
"White Noise" (Disclosure featuring AlunaGeorge)	2013	2	—	19	51	—	BPI: 3× Platinum; RMNZ: Platinum	Settle
"Royals / White Noise" (Live from the BRITs) (Disclosure and Lorde featuring AlunaGeorge)	2014	72	—	—	93	—		Non-album single
"One Touch" (Baauer featuring AlunaGeorge and Rae Sremmurd)	2014	—	—	— (Note: "One Touch" did not enter the Ultratop 50, but peaked at number 79 on the Flemish Ultratip chart.)	—	—		ß
"To Ü" (Jack Ü featuring AlunaGeorge)	2015	—	83	—	—	28	RMNZ: Platinum	Skrillex and Diplo Present Jack Ü
"Blow You Up" (Yogi featuring AlunaGeorge and Less Is Moore)	2016	—	—	—	—	44		Non-album singles
"Man Down" (Shakka featuring AlunaGeorge)	2018	25	—	—	—	—	BPI: 2× Platinum	Non-album singles
"Hurting" (SG Lewis featuring AlunaGeorge)	2018	—	—	—	—	42		Dark EP
"Before U" (Sonny Fodera and King Henry featuring AlunaGeorge)	2020	—	—	—	—	—		Non-album singles
"Alone with You" (Kito featuring AlunaGeorge)	2020	—	—	—	—	—		Non-album singles
"Turn Back Time" (George Reid featuring AlunaGeorge)	2026	—	—	—	—	—		Non-album singles
"—" denotes a recording that did not chart or was not released in that territory.

== Remixes ==
Title	Year	Artist
"I'm His Girl"	2011	Friends
"Spectrum (Say My Name)"	2012	Florence and the Machine
"The Socialites"	2013	Dirty Projectors
"Magic"	2014	Coldplay

== Guest appearances ==
Title	Year	Other artist(s)	Album
"One Touch VIP"	2014	Baauer	ß
"Together"	2016	Kaytranada, GoldLink	99.9%
"Innocence"	2016	Flume	Skin
"What Would I Change It To"	2017	Avicii	Avīci (01)

== Production discography ==
Year	Artist	Song	Album	Contributor(s)
2013	Raleigh Ritchie	"A Moor"	You're a Man Now, Boy	George Reid
2015	Nao	"Golden"	February 15 EP	George Reid
2016	Taya	"Sweet Taste of Time"	Taya	George Reid
2016	Qbik	"Dalej Nalej"	Trapsolwent	George Reid
2016	Off Bloom	"Love to Hate It"	Love to Hate It EP	George Reid
2016	TĀLĀ	"Tell Me That"	Zāl EP	George Reid
2017	Saint Wknd	"Make You Mine" feat. Boy Matthews	Golden Youth EP	George Reid
2017	Cosmo's Midnight	"Mind Off" feat. Kodu Blue	Non-album single	George Reid
2017	Off Bloom	"Shut Up and Let Me Walk"	Lover Like Me EP	George Reid
2018	Digital Farm Animals	"Say My Name" feat. Iman	Non-album single	George Reid
2018	Ina Wroldsen	"Mine"	Hex EP	George Reid
2018	Jones	"If You're Gonna Leave Somebody"	New York EP	George Reid
2018	Tom Aspaul	"Going Down"	Non-album single	George Reid
2019	Amber-Simone	"Only You"	For These Moments EP	George Reid
2019	Pabllo Vittar	"Flash Pose" with Charli XCX	111	Aluna Francis
2020	Melanie C	"Overload"	Melanie C	George Reid
2020	Master Peace	"PNE"	Love Bites	George Reid
2020	Master Peace	"Never Wanna Be"	Love Bites	George Reid
2020	Master Peace	"Regular Feelings"	Love Bites	George Reid
2021	Off Bloom	"Boys Don't Make Me Cry"	Off Bloom	George Reid
2021	Tayo Sound	"Runaway"	Runaway EP	George Reid
2021	Master Peace	"Overdrive"	Public Display of Affection EP	George Reid
2021	Georgia Twinn	"Matty Healy"	Love Sick	George Reid
2021	Master Peace	"Slow Song" feat. Kasien	Public Display of Affection EP	George Reid
2022	Years & Years	"Night Call"	Night Call	George Reid
2022	Years & Years	"20 Minutes"	Night Call	George Reid
2022	Years & Years	"Immaculate"	Night Call	George Reid

== Music videos ==
Title	Year	Director(s)
"You Know You Like It"	2011	Laurence Matthew Blake and Matilda Finn
"Just a Touch"	2012	Laurence Matthew Blake and Matilda Finn
"Your Drums, Your Love"	2012	Henry Schofield
"White Noise" (Disclosure featuring AlunaGeorge)	2013	Luke Monaghan
"Attracting Flies"	2013	Emil Nava
"You Know You Like It" (second version)	2013	Sammy Rawal
"Best Be Believing"	2013	Patrick Killingbeck
"You Know You Like It" (DJ Snake featuring AlunaGeorge)	2014	Dori Oskowitz
"To Ü" (Jack Ü featuring AlunaGeorge)	2015	AG Rojas
"I'm in Control" (featuring Popcaan)	2016	Emil Nava
"I Remember"	2016	Daniel Iglesias Jr.
"Mean What I Mean" (featuring Leikeli47 and Dreezy)	2016	Motion Family
"Fake Magic" (Peking Duk featuring AlunaGeorge)	2017	Ellis Bahl
"Man Down" (Shakka featuring AlunaGeorge)	2018	KC Locke
"Hurting" (SG Lewis featuring AlunaGeorge)	2018	
"Superior Emotion" (featuring Cautious Clay)	2018	Courtney Brookes
