= Champagne Eyes =

EP by AlunaGeorge
- Released: 5 October 2018
- Recorded: 2018
- Length: 18:03
- Label: Self-released
- Producer: AlunaGeorge; Jay Moon; Baauer; Big Kidd; Chris Lyon

AlunaGeorge chronology
I Remember (2016)	Champagne Eyes (2018)

Singles from Champagne Eyes
- 1. "Superior Emotion" Released: 6 September 2018; 2. "Cold Blooded Creatures" Released: 28 March 2019; 3. "Famoso" Released: 5 April 2019

Champagne Eyes is the second EP by English electronic music duo AlunaGeorge. It was released on 5 October 2018. The album includes collaborations with Bryson Tiller, Cautious Clay, and Baauer. The lead single, "Superior Emotion", was released in September 2018, featuring vocals from singer Cautious Clay.

== Background ==
Francis and Reid have been on hiatus since releasing I Remember (2016). Champagne Eyes is their first independent release, and they were able to have total creative freedom on the EP. Bryson Tiller features on "Cold Blooded Creatures" and Cautious Clay features on "Superior Emotion", which were said to have "sultry, sensual sound that could never be labeled as a single genre" by Billboard. The EP also features elements of R&B, pop and dance, and was compared to the "cool, fearless vibe" of the duo's 2013 debut album Body Music.

== Track listing ==
No.	Title	Writer(s)	Producer(s)	Length
1.	"Faulty"	Aluna Francis; George Reid; Jay Moon; WENS	AlunaGeorge; Jay Moon	2:32
2.	"Champagne Eyes" (featuring Baauer)	Francis; Reid; Baauer	AlunaGeorge; Baauer	3:04
3.	"Superior Emotion" (featuring Cautious Clay)	Francis; Reid; Bigg Kidd; Joshua Karpeh	AlunaGeorge; Bigg Kidd	3:26
4.	"Famous"	Francis; Reid	AlunaGeorge	2:58
5.	"Cold Blooded Creatures" (featuring Bryson Tiller)	Francis; Reid; Bryson Tiller; Chris Lyon; Calle Lehmann	AlunaGeorge; Chris Lyon	3:08
6.	"Shallow Water"	Francis; Reid; Bigg Kidd	AlunaGeorge; Bigg Kidd	2:55
Total length:				18:03
