= My Toys Like Me =

- Origin: London, England
- Years active: 1997–present
- Members: Original members (1997–2011): Frances Noon (aka Aluna Francis); Lazlo Legezer; Charlie Boud (live shows); Alfonso Pisanelli (live shows)

My Toys Like Me was an English electronic music act from London, which originally consisted of Frances Noon also known as Aluna Francis, (now of the band AlunaGeorge) and Lazlo Legezer, who both met in 2005.

It was formed as a studio project but later evolved into a four-piece band. Aluna Francis had previously recorded an album with Earth Leakage Trip and formed the indie band The Boundary. Lazlo Legezer began making rave records in the early 1990s as Psi-Q Network and did the first ever live set on seminal illegal rave soundsystem Spiral Tribe. He produced many styles of music under different names, including an album, Mimoid, with lyrics by Jachym Topol.

Their first single "Sick Couple" was released on 7" vinyl in 1997. Sold exclusively through Rough Trade and described on their homepage as "like hearing Portishead or a long lost 50's record for the first time", the limited run of 500 copies sold out in two weeks. They developed a strong following on the then thriving Myspace, and topped play charts ahead of mainstream promoted artists.

Two new members were recruited in 2007 to play live – Charlie Boud on guitar and bass and Alfonso Pisanelli on drums. Early gigs included support for Brazilian chart-toppers C.S.S. and Trash City (a late night field at Glastonbury), and they came second in 2007's Diesel-U-Music competition. Later they played festivals in the UK and Europe and supported Kraftwerk and Aphex Twin at Livorno football stadium in Italy.

In 2009, they released their debut album Where We Are. Uncut magazine said "Are you ready for the most playful, inventive, life-affirming British debut of the decade?" The Sunday Times Culture Supplement said "Great album, Great band" and "Brilliant Cult Electro Quartet". They performed a live session on Rob Da Bank's Radio 1 show. Tracks from the album were used on both the British and U.S. versions of the television show Skins.

== Recent events ==
Soon after the drummer of the band emigrated to Canada, My Toys Like Me ceased performing live and concentrated on working on their second album Come On Sunshine. Having completed six songs which appear on the album (and possibly others which have not been released), and filmed a video for the proposed single "Freak", Francis left to form AlunaGeorge with George Reid. AlunaGeorge went on to have a number 2 hit on the UK Singles Chart with "White Noise" in collaboration with Disclosure, and their album, Body Music reached number 11 on the UK Albums Chart.

The album Come On Sunshine was completed with guest vocals from Ahu Kelesoglu (Dolly) features on the song 'Lost', as well as Karis McLarty and Dan Bowskill (Dub Pistols) on the songs 'Come On Sunshine' and 'Feathers' respectively. It never enjoyed a proper release, but has appeared on mainstream download sites.

A single, "Come On Sunshine" featuring the vocals of Karis McLarty, was released on 3 October 2011. A promo titled Come On Sunshine was also made available via download stores and included the tracks "Freak" and "Matador".

It is unclear if or when My Toys Like Me will release further material, or if Legezer is working on other projects.

== Discography ==
=== Albums ===
- 2009: Where We Are
- 2011: Come On Sunshine (online release)

=== EPs ===
- 2011: Come On Sunshine (containing "Come On Sunshine", "Freak" and "Matador") (promo release)

=== Singles ===
- 1997: "Sick Couple" (limited edition)
- 2011: "Freak"
- 2011: "Come On Sunshine" (featuring Karis McLarty)
