= Aa (album) =

Studio album by Baauer
- Released: March 18, 2016
- Recorded: 2014–2016
- Genre: Electronic; trap; bass; hip hop
- Length: 33:27
- Label: LuckyMe
- Producer: Baauer; Noah Beresin; Mason Klein (exec.)

Baauer chronology
ß (2014)	Aa (2016)	Planet's Mad (2020)

Singles from Aa
- 1. "GoGo!" Released: October 20, 2015; 2. "Day Ones" Released: January 28, 2016; 3. "Temple" Released: March 16, 2016

Aa (pronounced "double a") is the debut studio album by American record producer Harry Rodrigues, under his alias Baauer, released by LuckyMe on March 18, 2016. It has guest features by Future, G-Dragon, Leikeli47, M.I.A., Novelist, Pusha T, Rustie, Tirzah and TT the Artist.

== Background and recording ==
That song ["Harlem Shake"] gave me the opportunity to travel the world. The whole world. And in doing so learnt more about music than I could have ever imagined. But more so than anything I discovered, what makes a sound special to me is its imperfections, its peculiarities. I spent the last couple years trying to get all of those imperfections into one record, and I think finally it makes sense.

- Rodrigues, 2016

After Rodrigues' debut single, "Harlem Shake", spawned numerous Internet memes, he stated that "it became corny and annoying as fuck". He also stated: "I didn't want to be an EDM producer and I still don't want to be".

The album is named after Rodrigues' stage name, Baauer. He said: "I have two A's in my name, and also the first release I did on LuckyMe was ß, so this is gonna be Aa and in the future I'll do a U, and then ER".

Rodrigues recorded the album in Glasgow, Japan and the United Arab Emirates for "at least two years".

== Music ==
Aa is an electronic, trap, bass and hip hop album. It is also influenced by M.I.A. and tribal music.

== Artwork ==
The artwork was designed by Jonathan Zawada and Dominic Flannigan. It depicts a tree rising from an upturned motorcycle helmet, which is a reference to the "Harlem Shake" music videos.

== Critical reception ==
Professional ratings
Aggregate scores
Source	Rating
AnyDecentMusic?	7.4/10
Metacritic	76/100
Review scores
Source	Rating
AllMusic	3.5/5 stars
Clash	5/10
Consequence of Sound	B
Exclaim!	9/10
The Guardian	3/5 stars
Pitchfork	7.3/10
Q	3/5 stars
Resident Advisor	3.3/5
Rolling Stone Australia	3.5/4 stars
The Skinny	5/5 stars

At review aggregate site Metacritic, Aa has an average score of 76 out of 100, based on 11 reviews, indicating "generally favorable reviews".

=== Accolades ===
Accolades for Aa
Publication	Accolade	Rank
Billboard	10 Best Dance/Electronic Albums of 2016	9
Complex	50 Best Albums of the Year	35

== Track listing ==
Aa
No.	Title	Length
1.	"Church"	1:45
2.	"GoGo!"	3:14
3.	"Body"	3:31
4.	"Pinku"	2:05
5.	"Sow"	3:11
6.	"Day Ones" (featuring Novelist and Leikeli47)	2:51
7.	"Good & Bad"	1:09
8.	"Way from Me" (featuring Tirzah)	3:17
9.	"Temple" (featuring M.I.A. and G-Dragon)	3:05
10.	"Make It Bang" (featuring TT the Artist)	3:20
11.	"Kung Fu" (featuring Pusha T and Future)	2:34
12.	"Church Reprise" (featuring Rustie)	1:32
13.	"Aa"	1:15
Total length:		33:27

== Personnel ==
Credits for Aa.

- Baauer – producer, writer, recording
- Caleb Leven – vocal engineering
- Dominic Flannigan – design
- Future – vocals ("Kung Fu")
- G-Dragon – vocals ("Temple")
- Joe LaPorta – mastering
- Johnatan Zawada – design
- Leikeli47 – vocals ("Day Ones")
- Mason Klein – executive producer
- M.I.A. – vocals ("Temple")
- Noah Beresin – production ("Church", "Way from Me", "Temple")
- Novelist – vocals ("Day Ones")
- Pusha T – vocals ("Kung Fu")
- Rustie – guitar ("Church Reprise")
- Ryan Schwabe – mixing, vocal engineering
- Stewart Hawkes – mastering
- S-Type – additional production
- Tirzah – vocals ("Way from Me")
- TT The Artist – vocals ("Make It Bang")

== Charts ==
Chart performance for Aa
Chart (2016)	Peak position
Australian Albums (ARIA)	52
UK Dance Albums (OCC)	23
US Heatseekers Albums (Billboard)	11
US Independent Albums (Billboard)	45
US Top Dance Albums (Billboard)	3
