= Glass Swords =

Studio album by Rustie
- Released: 10 October 2011
- Recorded: 2008–2010
- Genres: Electronic; future bass
- Length: 42:14
- Label: Warp
- Producer: Rustie

Rustie chronology
Sunburst EP (2010)	Glass Swords (2011)	Green Language (2014)

Singles from Glass Swords
- 1. "Ultra Thizz" Released: 6 September 2011; 2. "Surph" Released: March 2012; 3. "After Light" Released: 23 July 2012

Glass Swords is the debut studio album by Scottish producer Russell Whyte under his alias of Rustie, released by Warp in 2011. The album was produced and recorded between 2008 and 2010 by Whyte, partially in his father's home in Glasgow, Scotland and partly in his own home in London, England. The album contains vocal work from Whyte as well as London based producer Nightwave.

Glass Swords is a musically diverse album that critics found hard to classify as anything specific other than electronic music. The track "Ultra Thizz" was released as a single in September 2011 before the album's release in October of the same year. Re-worked versions of the songs "Surph" and "After Light" were released as singles in 2012 with new vocalists. The album received critical acclaim and was listed as one of the best albums of 2011 by The Guardian, The Wire and Mixmag and shortlisted for the Scottish Album of the Year Award in 2012.

== Production ==
Whyte stated that he began working on the album in "2008 maybe" and worked on it for a two-year period. Glass Swords was recorded in Whyte's father's house in Glasgow and in his home in London after Whyte had moved there. The album's music was developed with Whyte not having a strong idea for it, noting that he was "just making tracks and not really thinking too much of it as being an album". The album was created using Ableton on a personal computer along with a MIDI guitar controller, a MIDI keyboard, keyboard, electric guitar and a microphone. To give the album an analogue sound, Whyte used compressors and tape distortion plugins to get the tracks what he described as a "sort of warmth". Vocals on the album were done by Whyte on the track "Surph" while his girlfriend Nightwave performed some of the backing vocals. Whyte described his music as trying to channel "good energy, just love and peace and happiness and joy. That's what I want from my music, and that's what I want other people to feel."

The last six months of production were spent by Whyte "trying to glue everything together so it made sense as an album." This involved adding intros to some tracks and other motifs to "make it make more sense". Whyte created around one hundred tracks for the album and whittled down the album to a final selection of fourteen. These tracks were sent back and forth between himself and Warp which Whyte described as a "long process" as he found it difficult having people critique the music he wanted to release. Prior to the release of Glass Swords and any single, Whyte released the EP Sunburst in 2010. Several tracks originally planned for the album were described by Whyte as "a lot weirder and more ambient", but that Warp "didn't really want that".

== Style ==
"How does one categorise Rustie? Hip hop? Post-dubstep? Tropical house? Sci-fi trance? Ecstatic techno?"

— The Telegraph reviewer Lucy Jones on placing Glass Swords into a specific genre.

Music critics described the album as spanning several subgenres of electronic music. Spin opined that Glass Swords' music "doesn't adhere to any strict definition of genre beyond loose electronic". A reviewer for Fact described the influences of the album as being from video games, progressive rock and "big room dance music". while the BBC stated the songs on the album are "often jamming five or six recognisable influences into a single four-minute track." These included "glossy synths", dirty south hip hop percussion and "fragments of dubstep, UK garage, classic Detroit techno and trance music". AllMusic shared the multiple genres view, finding that it integrated "the currently hip and terminally unhip – garish probes of '80s synth rock, beaten-to-a-pulp dance-pop, '90s rave, and bass music, to name four of several drawing points."

"Surph"
"Surph" from Glass Swords. A song featuring vocals from Rustie and Nightwave and parts of various genres of music

MTV noted the pop culture references in Glass Swords, namely "Hover Traps" samples the video game The Legend of Zelda: Ocarina of Time and the title of "Ultra Thizz" references Bay Area slang for the drug ecstasy. Both Drowned in Sound and Resident Advisor felt that the slap bass on "Hover Traps" "sounds like it was taken right off of Seinfeld". Pitchfork noted that the album's more traditional dubstep songs "won't sit still or do what they're supposed to". Specifically, "Crystal Echo" contains sped-up voices and melodies with a dubstep-styled bass while "Surph" used the bass drops related to dubstep but also includes what Pitchfork describes as "pop-rave pianos, trance keyboards, and snippets of sugary R&B".

== Release ==
A single of "Ultra Thizz" was released by Warp as a 12" vinyl single and as a digital download on 6 September 2011. For the Glass Swords album cover, Whyte was shown various designer's portfolios by Warp. Whyte chose Jonathan Zawada, as he felt it had a "'70s sci-fi art feel". After discussing ideas with Whyte, Zawada gave him the album cover in a few days. When asked about the album cover resembling two erect penises, Whyte responded "Everyone says that! That's what I thought when I first saw it and I was like, 'Am I okay with that?' And, yeah, that's fine."

Glass Swords was released by Warp on vinyl, compact disc and digital download on 10 October 2011 in the United Kingdom and 11 October in the United States. A launch party for Glass Swords was held on 1 October 2011, which included a performance from Rustie along with DJ sets from Darkstar, Nightwave and Spencer.

A re-worked version of "Surph" was released as a single featuring Nightwave on vocals in March 2012. In 2012, a re-worked version of the song "After Light" was released with Aluna Francis, the singer for United Kingdom-based R&B group AlunaGeorge, providing the vocals. Whyte's follow-up album to Glass Swords titled Green Language was released in 2014.

== Critical reception ==
Professional ratings
Aggregate scores
Source	Rating
AnyDecentMusic?	7.5/10
Metacritic	82/100
Review scores
Source	Rating
AllMusic	4/5 stars
Drowned in Sound	8/10
Fact	5/5
The Guardian	4/5 stars
The Irish Times	4/5 stars
Mojo	4/5 stars
Pitchfork	8.0/10
Resident Advisor	4.0/5
Uncut	3/5 stars
XLR8R	9/10

At Metacritic, which assigns a normalised rating out of 100 to reviews from mainstream critics, the album has received an average score of 82, indicating universal acclaim, based on 14 reviews. Pitchfork stated that "One of the best things about Glass Swords is that, for all of its pop-goes-clubbing bluster, it's also as psychedelic, where the devil's in the zillion little details zigzagging across the tracks" and that "there's not a lot here that will redefine your ideas of what dubstep or electronic music in general can do. For all of Rustie's skill as a sculptor of very 21st-century beats, Glass Swords can feel just as much like a "greatest bits" collage." Fact gave the album a five out of five rating, stating that "you get the impression that it's the point Rustie has been building up to for the last five years; an album made in relative isolation, with zero self-consciousness, shame or thought for trend behind it." Drowned in Sound gave the album an eight out of ten rating, finding that the album is "equally impressive is the fact that this formula (or lack thereof) never grows tired. Thirteen tracks of excess could easily have been a recipe for sighs, but instead it is consistently addictive and grin-inducing."

The BBC described Whyte's music as "a little difficult to handle" but that the album "shows just the right amount of restraint to prevent total disarray. Even if the album weren't half as much fun as it is, that feat would be worthy of celebration in itself." Exclaim! noted that "songs like "Hover Traps," "Death Mountain" and "All Nite" are, at their core, extremely primitive. But it's in the way that Rustie builds, deconstructs and sequences his songs that allows Glass Swords to work its way into your psyche" and that "after a couple of listens, one may come to the conclusion that Rustie might just be a one-trick-pony. But, man, that one trick is perfect." Uncut referred to the album as "easy to admire but hard to love".

Glass Swords was listed on several critics' year-end lists. Mixmag and The Wire placed Glass Swords as the third and second best albums of 2011 respectively. The Guardian placed the album at ninth in their list of Best Albums of 2011 stating that the album was "the sound of uninhibited, unironic hands-in-the-air joy: banger after banger after banger."

In 2012, The Guardian awarded Rustie with their First Album award, opining that "Rustie's music first attacks like a day-glo migraine, a couple of spins reveals an album imbued with real emotion." Glass Swords was shortlisted for the Scottish Album of the Year Award in 2012. In 2014, Fact placed the album at number one on their list of "Top 100 Albums of the Decade So Far", describing the album as "full of exhilarating, ecstatic, thrilling, fun and sometimes downright silly songs" and "It's the sound of someone changing dance music by utterly disregarding dance music."

Reflecting on the album in 2014, Whyte stated that he felt that he "went kind of quite crazy on Glass Swords" and that he was "taking the piss with kitsch sounds and over-the-top silliness". Whyte stated that he wanted his next album Green Language to be different and "more serious".

== Track listing ==
All songs composed by Rustie.

No.	Title	Length
1.	"Glass Swords"	2:20
2.	"Flash Back"	3:47
3.	"Surph"	4:33
4.	"Hover Traps"	3:00
5.	"City Star"	3:08
6.	"Globes"	2:46
7.	"Ultra Thizz"	3:59
8.	"Death Mountain"	3:24
9.	"Cry Flames"	3:48
10.	"After Light"	3:42
11.	"Ice Tunnels"	1:17
12.	"All Nite"	3:08
13.	"Crystal Echo"	3:22
Total length:		42:14

== Personnel ==
Adapted from the AllMusic credits.

- Mike Marsh – mastering
- Nightwave – vocals
- Rustie – engineer, producer
- Jonathan Zawada – design

== See also ==
- 2011 in music
