= Novelist (musician) =

English grime musician (born 1997)

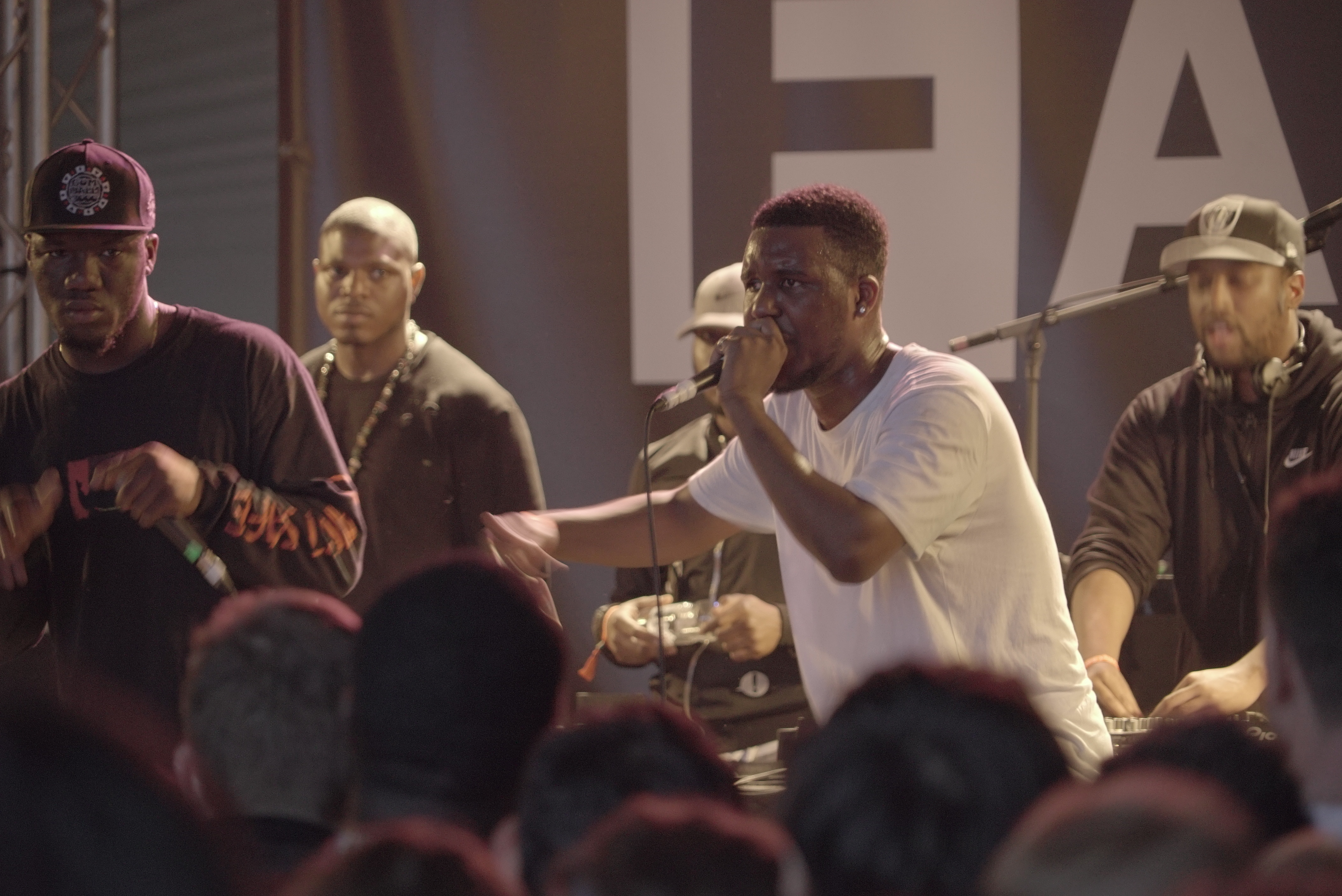
- Novelist performing at Field Day 2016

Background information
- Also known as: Navy Nov; Mr Tetris; Nov
- Born: Kwadwo Quentin Kankam; 20 January 1997 (age 29); Brockley, Lewisham, London, England
- Genres: British hip hop; grime
- Occupations: Rapper; MC; songwriter; record producer
- Years active: 2010–present
- Labels: MMMYEH; XL; No Hats No Hoods

Kwadwo Quentin Kankam (born 20 January 1997), better known by his stage name Novelist, is a British grime MC and record producer. He was a founding member of the Square crew and was nominated for Best Grime Act at the 2014 MOBO Awards. He has been called the "new face of grime" and was described as "the poster child for the first generation of real grime kids" by DJ Logan Sama.

== Early life ==
Kankam is from Lewisham in southeast London and is of Antiguan and Ghanaian descent.

== Career ==
In 2013 Novelist clashed with Wiley's younger brother Cadell for the grime DVD Who's Da Boss and began to garner attention from the UK underground music scene for his regular appearances on London pirate radio stations. Novelist was featured in a BBC Radio 1Xtra documentary broadcast on mother's day called Grime Mums focusing on the role parents played in the careers of prominent grime MCs. After an instrumental track called "Sniper" began to receive airplay on London underground radio stations Novelist was signed to produce an instrumental EP for influential grime imprint Oil Gang. He recorded a song entitled "Take Time" in a studio session with experimental producer Mumdance in October 2013, which was later signed to Rinse and released as a single in the summer of 2014.

In early 2014, Novelist's music began receiving regular rotation on radio stations including BBC Radio 1Xtra and Rinse FM. He recorded a guest set for DJ Cable's "Sixty Minutes" mix, which was broadcast on MistaJam's BBC 1Xtra show on 28 May 2014, he featured on Cable's Sixty Minutes mix again later that year recording a second guest set with his crew The Square. In late 2013 Novelist began working with No Hats No Hoods. In mid-2014, the label signed The Square, their first release on the label The Formula came out in August 2014. In 2014, Novelist signed to XL Recordings and recorded a track with Jamie xx for his forthcoming release on the label, however the track was not released. In September 2014, Novelist received a MOBO nomination in the Best Grime Act category. In November 2014, Novelist was named on the longlist for the BBCs Sound of 2015 list and XL Recordings announced that his debut release on the label would be a collaborative EP with Mumdance. The EP, entitled 1 Sec was released on 20 January 2015, the same day he turned 18.

On 1 September 2015, Novelist left the Square with the stated intention of furthering his solo career. On 17 October 2015, Novelist supported Major Lazer at Alexandra Palace, London, during their European tour. In early 2016, he featured on a Baauer single called "Day Ones" and appeared on Skepta's 2016 Mercury-winning album Konnichiwa with "Lyrics".

In August 2016, Novelist was dropped from XL Recordings. He subsequently announced on 23 August that he is launching MMMYEH Records as his own label to release his own music along with his friends. On 13 April 2018, Novelist released his debut album, Novelist Guy. The album charted on the UK iTunes Charts for a single day after its release at No. 38 and was a commercial failure. It was nominated for the 2018 Mercury Prize, losing out to Visions of a Life by Wolf Alice.

== Discography ==
=== Studio albums ===
List of studio albums, with chart positions
Title	Album details	Peak chart positions			
Title	Album details	UK	UK R&B	UK Ind.	UK Ind. Breakers
Novelist Guy	Released: 13 April 2018; Label: MMMYEH Records; Formats: CD, digital download	—	—	—	17
Scenes	Released: 27 November 2026; Label: MASHWRKS; Formats: CD, digital download	—	—	—	—
"—" denotes a recording that did not chart or was not released in that territory.

=== Extended plays ===
Title	Details
Sniper EP	Released: 7 July 2014; Label: Oil Gang; Formats: Digital download, vinyl
1 Sec EP	Released: 20 January 2015; Label: XL Recordings; Formats: Digital download, vinyl
Yakuta EP	Released: 31 January 2017; Label: MMMYEH Records; Formats: Digital download, vinyl
Be Blessed EP	Released: 28 April 2017; Label: MMMYEH Records; Formats: Digital download
Reload King EP	Released: 28 June 2019; Label: MMMYEH Records; Formats: Digital download
Inferno	Released: 20 January 2020; Label: MMMYEH Records; Formats: Digital download
Heat	Released: 4 April 2020; Label: MMMYEH Records; Formats: Digital download
Rain Fire	Released: 10 April 2020; Label: MMMYEH Records; Formats: Digital download
4 Tha Homiez	Released: 27 May 2022; Label: MMMYEH Records; Formats: Digital download
4 Me (with JiKay)	Released: 9 December 2022; Label: MMMYEH Records; Formats: Digital download
Audacity	Released: 12 September 2025; Label: MMMYEH Records; Formats: Digital download

=== With the Square ===
Title	Details
The Formula	Released: 25 August 2014; Label: No Hats No Hoods; Formats: Digital download
Lewisham McDeez	Released: 23 April 2015; Label: No Hats No Hoods; Formats: Digital download

=== Singles ===
List of solo singles, showing year released and album name
Title	Year	Album
"New Path"	2017	Non-album singles
"No Weapons / See Me"	2018	Non-album singles
"Nov Wait Stop Wait"	2018	Novelist Guy
"Pay What Is Owed"	2020	Non-album single
"Active"	2020	Inferno EP
"Stay With Me"	2020	Non-album singles
"Dun Know (Part 1)"	2020	Non-album singles

=== Guest appearances ===
List of non-single guest appearances, with other performing artists, showing year released and album name
Title	Year	Peak chart positions		Album
Title	Year	UK	UK R&B	Album
"Take Time" (Mumdance featuring Novelist)	2014	—	—	Take Time
"Flavour" (with Murlo)	2014	—	—	Monki & Friends EP Vol. 2
"One and Only" (with Murlo)	2014	—	—	Monki & Friends EP Vol. 2
"Bigger Man Sound" (Chase & Status featuring Novelist)	2015	—	—	London Bars Vol. IV
"Day Ones" (Baauer feat. Novelist and Leikeli47)	2016	—	—	Aa
"Lyrics" (Skepta featuring Novelist)	2016	62	17	Konnichiwa
"Can't Tell Me Nothing" (Nick Hook featuring Novelist)	2017	—	—	Can't Tell Me Nothing EP
"NRG" (Chase & Status featuring Novelist)	2017	—	—	Tribe
"Serious Choices" (Kid D featuring Novelist)	2020	—	—	Substance EP
