= Future bass =

EDM music genre originating in the 2010s

- Stylistic origins: Purple sound; dubstep; trap; footwork; other forms of electronic dance music
- Cultural origins: Early 2010s, Australia, United Kingdom, United States
- Typical instruments: Digital audio workstation; keyboard; synthesizer; sampler; music sequencer; guitar

Subgenres
- Kawaii future bass; Futurecore

Other topics
- Future house; future garage; rage

Future bass is a style of electronic dance music which developed in the 2010s that mixes elements of dubstep and EDM trap with warmer, less abrasive rhythms. The genre was pioneered by producers such as Rustie, Hudson Mohawke, Lido, San Holo and Cashmere Cat, and it was popularised in the mid to late-2010s by artists such as Flume, Martin Garrix, Illenium, Louis the Child and Mura Masa. 2016 was seen as the breakout year for the genre.

== History ==
The genre was pioneered by Scottish producers Rustie and Hudson Mohawke, who began producing future bass tracks in 2010. One of the first popularity-fueling releases in the genre was Rustie's album Glass Swords, released in 2011. Later, in 2013, the Flume remix of Disclosure's song "You & Me" brought the genre into the mainstream, and through the mid-2010s future bass became popular in the United Kingdom, United States, Japan, China, Korea and Australia.

== Characteristics ==
The sound waves are often modulated using automation or low-frequency oscillation controlling the cutoff of an audio filter (typically a low- or high-pass filter), or the wave's amplitude, to adjust the waveform (to create a ‘wobbly’ effect on its parameters). In addition, it is common to utilize a somewhat "twinkly"-sounding gradual rise in pitch during "risers" (gradual pre-drop buildups of white noise), and arpeggio chords, vocal chops, or vocoders.

Tracks commonly feature a 4/4 time signature with BPM set between 130BPM to 175BPM.

== Subgenres ==
=== Kawaii future bass ===
Kawaii future bass
- Etymology: Cute future bass, see Kawaii
- Stylistic origins: Future bass, chiptune, denpa song, akishibu-kei
- Cultural origins: Early-to-mid 2010s, Japan

Other topics
- Bitpop; skweee

"🤼‍♀️ (:women_wrestling:)" by Jamie Paige, which demonstrates many of the kawaii future bass subgenre's characteristics.

Kawaii future bass (also known simply as kawaii bass) is a subgenre of future bass, known for its happy and cute timbre and strong Japanese pop culture influences. Often, chiptune sounds, soft square waves, samples from anime or video games, percussion instruments, and door and bed squeaks are incorporated into such songs. Snail's House and other producers have produced tracks of this subgenre, with the former being credited as the genre pioneer after releasing the extended play Kirara in 2015.

== See also ==
- List of future bass songs
- List of future bass albums and extended plays
