= I Remember (AlunaGeorge album) =

2016 studio album by AlunaGeorge

Studio album by AlunaGeorge
- Released: 16 September 2016
- Recorded: 2015–2016
- Studios: Record Plant (Los Angeles) (Note: Track 3); Rock Mafia (Santa Monica); Club Ralph (London) (Note: Tracks 5 and 10); Lion Aboard (London); Rodeo (Santa Monica) (Note: Track 6)
- Length: 43:54
- Label: Island
- Producers: AlunaGeorge; Flume; John Hill; Mark Ralph; Rock Mafia; Stint; Utters; Yogi; Zhu

AlunaGeorge chronology
Body Music (2013)	I Remember (2016)	Champagne Eyes (2018)

Singles from I Remember
- 1. "I'm in Control" Released: 21 January 2016; 2. "I Remember" Released: 15 April 2016; 3. "My Blood" Released: 28 April 2016; 4. "Mean What I Mean" Released: 13 July 2016; 5. "Mediator" Released: 2 September 2016

Professional ratings
Aggregate scores
Source	Rating
Metacritic	70/100
Review scores
Source	Rating
AllMusic	3.5/5 stars
DIY	4/5 stars
The Guardian	4/5 stars
London Evening Standard	3/5 stars
Mojo	3/5 stars
musicOMH	4/5 stars
NME	3/5
The Observer	4/5 stars
Q	3/5 stars
The Times	2/5 stars
Pitchfork	6.6/10

I Remember is the second studio album by English electronic music duo AlunaGeorge, released on 16 September 2016 by Island Records. The album includes collaborations with Popcaan, Zhu, Leikeli47, Dreezy, Flume and Pell. The album's lead single, "I'm in Control", was released in February 2016, featuring vocals from rapper Popcaan, and peaked at number 39 on the UK Singles Chart.

The album received generally positive reviews from music critics. I Remember debuted at number 71 on the UK Albums Chart, selling 1,419 copies in its first week.

== Background ==
The concept for the album emerged in 2014, when AlunaGeorge took part in several collaborations. One of the first collaborations was with DJ Snake, who remixed the duo's 2012 single "You Know You Like It". It was released in October 2014 and peaked at number 67 on the UK Singles Chart. Later that year, they collaborated with electronic musician Zhu on his lead track "Automatic" from his debut extended play Genesis Series.

In January 2016, the duo released their first official track since 2014, "I'm in Control", featuring vocals from dancehall rapper Popcaan. The single reached number 39 on the UK Singles Chart. In April 2016, the duo worked on their third collaboration with electronic musician Kaytranada, alongside rapper GoldLink, titled "Together". The song was released as part of Kaytranada's debut studio album, 99.9%, released in that same month. After the collaboration, the album's second single, "I Remember", was released on 15 April 2016, which later revealed the album's title. The song was produced by Australian musician Flume, and was inspired by their other collaboration with him, titled "Innocence", from his second studio album, Skin.

"My Blood" was released on 28 April 2016 as the album's third single, featuring production work from electronic musician Zhu, who they previously collaborated with in 2015. The fourth single, "Mean What I Mean", featuring vocals from rappers Leikeli47 and Dreezy, was released on 13 July 2016 to promote the album's pre-order release date, which became available on the same day. "Mediator" was released as the album's fifth and final single on 2 September 2016.

== Track listing ==
No.	Title	Writer(s)	Producer(s)	Length
1.	"Full Swing" (featuring Pell)	Aluna Francis; George Reid; Jean Baptiste; Mark Ralph; Jared Thomas Pellerin; Michael McHenry; Ryan "DJ Replay" Buendia	AlunaGeorge; Ralph	3:35
2.	"My Blood" (featuring Zhu)	Francis; Reid; Steven Zhu; Dante Jones	Zhu; Jones^{[a]}	3:34
3.	"Not Above Love"	Francis; Antonina Armato; Yogesh Tulsiani; Tim James; Christopher W. Smith; James Ryan Shelton Hall; Alexander Jeffrey Hall	Yogi; Rock Mafia; AlunaGeorge^{[a]}	3:10
4.	"Hold Your Head High"	Francis; Reid; Sam Romans; Ralph; Andrae Sutherland	AlunaGeorge; Ralph^{[b]}	4:00
5.	"Mean What I Mean" (featuring Leikeli47 and Dreezy)	Francis; Reid; Seandrea Sledge; Harold Lilly; Dan Radclyffe; Amanda Warner; Hasben Jones	AlunaGeorge; Utters^{[c]}; Ralph	3:51
6.	"Jealous"	Francis; John Hill; Ajay Bhattacharyya; Charlotte Aitchison; Jonnali Parmenius; Reid	Hill; Stint; AlunaGeorge	3:21
7.	"I'm in Control" (featuring Popcaan)	Francis; Reid; Romans; Ralph; Sutherland	AlunaGeorge; Ralph	3:29
8.	"I Remember"	Francis; Reid; Cass Lowe	Flume; AlunaGeorge	4:24
9.	"In My Head"	Francis; Reid	AlunaGeorge; Ralph	3:24
10.	"Mediator"	Francis; Reid; Tom Aspaul	AlunaGeorge; Ralph^{[a]}	3:47
11.	"Heartbreak Horizon"	Francis; Reid; Cathy Dennis	AlunaGeorge; Ralph^{[a]}	3:49
12.	"Wanderlust"	Francis; Reid; Hill; Bhattacharyya; Tom Hull	Hill; Stint; AlunaGeorge	3:30
Total length:				43:54

=== Notes ===
- ^{^[a]} signifies an additional producer
- ^{^[b]} signifies a co-producer
- ^{^[c]} signifies a main and vocal producer

=== Sample credits ===
- "Not Above Love" samples "Plan B" by Slow Motion Centerfold.

== Personnel ==
Credits adapted from the liner notes of I Remember.

=== AlunaGeorge ===
- Aluna Francis – vocals (tracks 1–3, 5, 6, 8–12)
- AlunaGeorge – vocals (tracks 4, 7)

=== Additional musicians ===
- Pell – additional vocals (track 1)
- Ivan Jackson – horn arrangements, trumpet (track 3)
- William Roper – tuba (track 3)
- Popcaan – additional vocals (tracks 4, 7)
- Leikeli47 – additional vocals (track 5)
- Dreezy – additional vocals (track 5)
- John Hill – keyboards, synths, drum programming, bass programming (tracks 6, 12)
- Ajay Bhattacharyya – keyboards, synths, drum programming, bass programming (tracks 6, 12)
- Utters – bass guitar, additional programming (track 10)
- James Trood – drums, percussion (track 10)
- Andrew Smith – Rhodes (track 10)
- Nick Tsang – guitar (track 10)

=== Technical ===
- AlunaGeorge – production (tracks 1, 4–12); additional production (track 3)
- Mark Ralph – production (tracks 1, 5, 7, 9); mixing (tracks 1, 4–12); co-production (track 4); additional production (tracks 10, 11)
- Drew Smith – recording engineering (tracks 1, 5, 7, 9–11); recording assistance (tracks 5, 9–11)
- Tom Ad Fuller – recording engineering (tracks 1, 5, 7, 9–11); recording assistance (tracks 5, 9–11)
- Stuart Hawkes – mastering (tracks 1, 3–12)
- Zhu – production, mixing (track 2)
- Dante Jones – additional production (track 2)
- Tony Cousins – mastering (track 2)
- Yogi – production (track 3)
- Rock Mafia – production (track 3)
- Mark "Spike" Stent – mixing (track 3)
- Michael Freeman – mix engineering (track 3)
- Utters – production, recording engineering, vocal production (track 5)
- Stint – production (tracks 6, 12)
- John Hill – production (tracks 6, 12)
- Rob Cohen – recording engineering (tracks 6, 12)
- Flume – production (track 8)
- Ryan Gilligan – recording engineering (track 12)

=== Artwork ===
- Arran Gregory – cover illustration
- Liam Ward – art direction

== Charts ==
Chart performance for I Remember
Chart (2016)	Peak position
Australian Albums (ARIA)	56
Belgian Albums (Ultratop Flanders)	169
Dutch Albums (Album Top 100)	131
French Albums (SNEP)	146
New Zealand Heatseeker Albums (RMNZ)	4
UK Albums (Official Charts)	71
US Heatseekers Albums (Billboard)	15
US Top Dance Albums (Billboard)	6
