= Evenifudontbelieve =

Studio album by Rustie
- Released: 5 November 2015
- Length: 46:38
- Label: Warp
- Producer: Rustie

Rustie chronology
Green Language (2014)	Evenifudontbelieve (2015)

Evenifudontbelieve (stylised as EVENIFUDONTBELIEVE) is the third studio album by Russel Whyte under his alias of Rustie. It was released on 5 November 2015 by Warp.

== Production ==
Tracks on Evenifudontbelieve were initially planned for an EP release, but Whyte felt that "there was so much with a similar vibe that it turned into an album pretty naturally." Whyte found that some of these tracks were getting good reactions in live settings and decided to skip an EP and organise the music into album length.

Fact described the album as containing "squealing prog guitar over huge rising synths, turbo trance riffs over even quicker trap drums" as well as happy hardcore.

== Release ==
Evenifudontbelieve was released on 5 November 2015 by the label Warp. A video for "First Mythz" premièred during Whyte's Reddit Ask Me Anything thread on 24 November 2015. The vinyl issue of the album was made available on March 18.

== Reception ==
Professional ratings
Aggregate scores
Source	Rating
Metacritic	74/100
Review scores
Source	Rating
Consequence of Sound	B−
NME	4/5
The Observer	4/5 stars
Pitchfork	7.3/10
Rolling Stone	3.5/5 stars
Spin	8/10

At Metacritic, which assigns a normalised rating out of 100 to reviews from mainstream critics, the album has received an average score of 74, indicating generally favourable reviews, based on ten reviews. Consequence of Sound gave the album a B− rating. The NME gave the album a four out of five rating, describing the album as "a perfect example of his blink-and-you'll-miss-it, magpie's eye gift for reassembling modern dance music styles in his own image" and that "The record may be more enjoyable than its predecessor, but it sometimes feels like the Rustie of 2011 has just been wheeled back out for another spin."

Fact placed the album at 11th place on their list of top albums of 2015, stating that Whyte "drills his agenda down to the things that make him tick: happy hardcore and trance, dolphins and pills, Coral Castlez and Big Catzz. It's so much fucking fun."

== Track listing ==
Several songs on the album are labelled as "featuring Rustie". Whyte recorded himself playing guitar and other instruments for these tracks.

All tracks are written by Rustie.

No.	Title	Length
1.	"Coral Elixrr" (featuring Rustie)	3:36
2.	"First Mythz"	3:36
3.	"Atlantean Airship"	3:06
4.	"4Eva" (featuring Rustie)	2:19
5.	"Big Catzz"	2:59
6.	"Peace Upzzz" (featuring Rustie)	3:45
7.	"Your Goddezz"	3:20
8.	"Coral Castlez"	3:36
9.	"What U Mean" (featuring Rustie)	3:00
10.	"Morning Starr" (featuring Rustie)	3:21
11.	"Death Bliss"	3:12
12.	"New Realm"	1:00
13.	"Emerald Tabletzz"	3:05
14.	"Open Heartzz"	2:28
15.	"444Sure" (featuring Rustie)	4:02
Total length:		46:38
