= Green Language (album) =

Studio album by Rustie
- Released: 25 August 2014
- Length: 36:46
- Label: Warp
- Producer: Rustie

Rustie chronology
Glass Swords (2011)	Green Language (2014)	Evenifyoudontbelieve (2015)

Singles from Green Language
- 1. "Attak" Released: 2014; 2. "Lost" Released: 2014

Green Language is the second studio album by Glaswegian producer Russell Whyte under the alias Rustie. The album, released on Warp on August 25, 2014, was announced with the track "Raptor" - first played by Annie Mac on BBC Radio 1 in June 2014. It features guest appearances from D Double E, Danny Brown, Gorgeous Children, and Redinho. The title of the album derives from "the language of the birds".

== Production ==
Reflecting on Glass Swords in 2014, Whyte stated that he felt that he "“went kind of quite crazy on Glass Swords" and that he was "taking the piss with kitsch sounds and over-the-top silliness." Whyte stated that he wanted his next album Green Language to be different and "more serious". In between the release of Glass Swords and Green Language, Whyte scrapped an entire album's worth of material that he stated "didn't feel right as an album."

== Release ==
Green Language was released on August 25, 2014.

== Reception ==
Professional ratings
Aggregate scores
Source	Rating
Metacritic	69/100
Review scores
Source	Rating
AllMusic	4/5 stars
Clash	6/10
Exclaim!	7/10
Fact	2.5/5 stars
The Guardian	4/5 stars
NME	7/10
Pitchfork	7.2/10
Rolling Stone	3/5 stars
Spin	8/10

At Metacritic, which assigns a normalised rating out of 100 to reviews from mainstream critics, the album has received an average score of 69, indicating "generally favorable reviews", based on 25 reviews.

Tshepo Mokoena of The Guardian gave the album a rating of 4 stars out of 5, calling it "an exercise in variety that pushes the boundaries of what a synth-driven album can, and should, sound like". Stephen Carlick of Exclaim! opined that "There are great tracks on Green Language, but a lack of consistency stops it from being a great album."

Tom Lea of Fact commented on the album in 2015 that the album "divided listeners". Whyte tweeted that he felt the Green Language was "too A&Red", later explaining that his managers were "trying to push me in one way, in kind of an avant garde, arty route, then I had other people trying to get me to do big singles, the vocal stuff and all that. I was getting pulled in two directions, which I think you can tell a little bit on the album."

Complex named the cover of Green Language as one of the 30 best album covers of 2014, while Pitchfork named it as one of the 20 best album covers of 2014.

== Track listing ==
All tracks are written by Rustie except where noted

No.	Title	Writer(s)	Length
1.	"Workship"		2:00
2.	"A Glimpse"		2:15
3.	"Raptor"		4:14
4.	"Paradise Stone"		2:34
5.	"Up Down" (featuring D Double E)	Rustie, D Double E	3:44
6.	"Attak" (featuring Danny Brown)	Rustie, Daniel Sewell	3:01
7.	"Tempest"		1:43
8.	"He Hate Me" (featuring Gorgeous Children)	Rustie, Jermaine Davis	3:16
9.	"Velcro"		3:18
10.	"Lost" (featuring Redinho)	Rustie, Tom Calvert	3:21
11.	"Dream On"	Rustie, Muhsinah Abdul-Karim	3:07
12.	"Lets Spiral"		2:27
13.	"Green Language"		1:54

Japanese edition bonus track
No.	Title	Length
14.	"Bonuzz"	2:48

== Personnel ==
- Rustie – engineer, producer
- Joe LaPorta – mastering

== Charts ==
Chart (2014)	Peak position
Belgian Albums (Ultratop Wallonia)	116
UK Albums (OCC)	154
US Top Dance/Electronic Albums (Billboard)	16
US Heatseekers Albums (Billboard)	22

== See also ==
- 2014 in music
