= I'm in Control =

Single by AlunaGeorge featuring Popcaan

from the album I Remember
- Released: 21 January 2016
- Genre: Dancehall; synth-pop
- Length: 3:29
- Label: Island
- Songwriters: Aluna Francis; George Reid; Sam Romans; Mark Ralph; Andrae Sutherland
- Producers: AlunaGeorge; Mark Ralph

AlunaGeorge singles chronology
"To Ü" (2015)	"I'm in Control" (2016)	"I Remember" (2016)

Popcaan singles chronology
"I Know There's Gonna Be (Good Times)" (2015)	"I'm in Control" (2016)	"Ova Dweet" (2016)

"I'm in Control" is a song by English electronic music duo AlunaGeorge, featuring Jamaican dancehall singer Popcaan. It was released on 21 January 2016 as the lead single from AlunaGeorge's second studio album, I Remember (2016). The song peaked at number 39 on the UK Singles Chart.

== Music video ==
The music video for the song was released to YouTube on 10 February 2016. The video is directed by Emil Nava.

== Track listings ==
Digital download
No.	Title	Length
1.	"I'm in Control" (featuring Popcaan)	3:29

Digital download – remix
No.	Title	Length
1.	"I'm in Control" (featuring Popcaan) (The Magician Remix)	4:35

== Charts ==
=== Weekly charts ===
Chart (2016)	Peak position
Australia (ARIA)	64
Belgium (Ultratip Bubbling Under Flanders)	25
Belgium (Ultratop 50 Wallonia)	32
Denmark (Tracklisten)	32
France (SNEP)	57
Ireland (IRMA)	60
Netherlands (Single Top 100)	50
Scottish Singles Sales (Official Charts)	35
UK Singles (Official Charts)	39
US Hot Dance/Electronic Songs (Billboard)	18

=== Year-end charts ===
Chart (2016)	Position
US Hot Dance/Electronic Songs (Billboard)	59

== Certifications ==
Region	Certification	Certified units/sales
Denmark (IFPI Danmark)	Gold	45,000^{‡}
New Zealand (RMNZ)	Gold	15,000^{‡}
United Kingdom (BPI)	Silver	200,000^{‡}
^{‡} Sales+streaming figures based on certification alone.
