= After Light =

Single by Rustie featuring AlunaGeorge

from the album Glass Swords
- Released: 23 July 2012
- Length: 3:08
- Label: Warp
- Songwriter(s): Russell Whyte

Rustie singles chronology
"Surph" (2012)	"After Light" (2012)	"Attak" (2014)

AlunaGeorge singles chronology
"You Know You Like It" (2012)	"After Light" (2012)	"Your Drums, Your Love" (2012)

"After Light" is a single by Scottish musician Rustie, featuring vocals from Aluna Francis of AlunaGeorge. The song was released in the United Kingdom as a digital download on 23 July 2012 from his debut studio album Glass Swords. The song features added vocals on top of an instrumental track of the same name, which was released in 2011. The song reached number 173 on the UK Singles Chart. This is also featured on the Warp radio station in the video game Sleeping Dogs.

== Track listing ==
Digital download
No.	Title	Length
1.	"After Light" (featuring AlunaGeorge)	3:08

== Charts ==
Chart (2012)	Peak position
Belgium (Ultratip Bubbling Under Flanders)	44
UK Singles (Official Charts Company)	153

== Release history ==
Region	Date	Format	Label
United Kingdom	23 July 2012	Digital download	Warp
