= Snail's House =

Japanese electronic musician

- Also known as: Ujico*, StripeCat
- Born: Keitaro Ujiie (氏家 慶太郎); February 23, 1997 (age 29); Komae, Tokyo, Japan
- Genres: Electronic; Kawaii future bass; Chillout
- Occupations: Composer, producer
- Years active: 2012–present
- Labels: Youth Composer Association; Cachettenotes; Attack the Music; Tasty; CHOMPO
- Website: ujicosnail.com

Keitaro Ujiie (Japanese: 氏家 慶太郎, Hepburn: Ujiie Keitarō; born February 23, 1997), professionally known as Snail's House or Ujico*, is a Japanese electronic musician. He currently resides in Saitama, Japan.

== History ==
He started publishing music on SoundCloud in 2012 under the name Ujico* (which he stated was a childhood nickname given to him by a friend). In 2013, Ujiie created his own record label, Youth Composer Association, a Tokyo-based label specifically geared towards young musicians. In 2014, after listening to performances by Hiromi Uehara and various jazz fusion music, Ujiie was inspired to start playing the piano.

From that point, his music career began to grow and he created a separate Snail's House outfit for his "kawaii" music, which officially began on August 30, 2014, with the release of "Nyan Nyan Angel!". His first two EPs as Snail's House, Kirara and Kawaii Collective, were released in mid-2015, containing high-pitched vocal chops, vibrant synthesizer sounds, and happy-sounding melodies.

On October 10, 2017, the music video for the song "Pixel Galaxy" was released onto YouTube. It quickly began to go viral and it gave Ujiie a large boost in followers, though the song has significantly fewer plays on all music streaming services, the music video now has more than 100 million views on YouTube.

On October 9, 2018, Ujiie announced that a small game was being developed for his upcoming two-track album Snailchan Adventure. The album was released on October 23 with an accompanying music video, and Ujiie published a preview of the unfinished game. As of May 1, 2019, the game has not been released, with development presumed to be ongoing.

== Discography ==
| Date | Title | As | Record label |
|---|---|---|---|
| July 13, 2013 | Ujico Rain | Ujico* | N/A; self-released |
| October 23, 2013 | Aerie | Ujico* | N/A; self-released |
| February 21, 2014 | VASS DROPPER | Ujico* | Youth Composer Association |
| April 27, 2014 | PF:Addiction | Ujico* | Youth Composer Association |
| June 30, 2014 | Goodbye, Our World EP | Ujico* | Youth Composer Association |
| July 10, 2014 | VASS DROPPER 2 | Ujico* | Youth Composer Association |
| December 30, 2014 | Storyteller | Ujico* | Youth Composer Association |
| March 30, 2015 | Junction EP | Ujico* | Youth Composer Association |
| March 31, 2015 | VASS DROPPER 3 | Ujico* | Youth Composer Association |
| May 13, 2015 | Kirara | Snail's House | TREKKIE TRAX |
| May 31, 2015 | Kawaii Collective | Snail's House | N/A; self-released |
| June 29, 2015 | -PROGRESS- | Ujico* | N/A; self-released |
| September 19, 2015 | Nyan Nyan Angel! Remixes | Snail's House | Youth Composer Association |
| December 24, 2015 | Sweety Sweety | Snail's House | N/A; self-released |
| December 30, 2015 | 空中都市 (Kūchū Toshi) | Ujico* | Youth Composer Association |
| March 29, 2016 | Ordinary Songs | Snail's House | N/A; self-released |
| June 12, 2016 | Dream Castle | Ujico* | N/A; self-released |
| August 27, 2016 | Love Story | Snail's House | N/A; self-released |
| November 17, 2016 | Ordinary Songs 2 | Snail's House | N/A; self-released |
| November 18, 2016 | Summer Nostalgia EP | Ujico* | Youth Composer Association |
| February 23, 2017 | Pixel Galaxy | Snail's House | N/A; self-released |
| June 15, 2017 | Ordinary Songs 3 | Snail's House | N/A; self-released |
| September 10, 2017 | WonderWorld | Ujico* | Cachettenotes |
| November 19, 2017 | [FLOWERS] | Ujico* | DiverseSystem |
| November 30, 2017 | エイリアン☆ポップ (Alien☆Pop) | Snail's House | N/A; self-released |
| February 23, 2018 | Ordinary Songs 4 | Snail's House | N/A; self-released |
| March 23, 2018 | Snö | Snail's House | N/A; self-released |
| June 1, 2018 | StripeCat Collection | Snail's House | N/A; self-released |
| July 28, 2018 | L'été | Snail's House | N/A; self-released |
| October 23, 2018 | Snailchan Adventure | Snail's House | N/A; self-released |
| January 18, 2019 | エイリアン☆ポップ II (Alien☆Pop II) | Snail's House | N/A; self-released |
| February 23, 2019 | Scenery | Snail's House | N/A; self-released |
| July 6, 2019 | エイリアン☆ポップ III (Alien☆Pop III) | Snail's House | N/A; self-released |
| August 16, 2019 | Love Magic | Snail's House | N/A; self-released |
| January 3, 2020 | 妖 -AYAKASHI- | Ujico* | N/A; self-released |
| February 23, 2020 | Vass Dropper 4 | Ujico* | N/A; self-released |
| March 31, 2020 | ujbeats vol.1 | Snail's House | Cachettenotes |
| October 23, 2020 | Imaginarium | Snail's House | Cachettenotes |
| February 13, 2021 | love songs | Snail's House | Cachettenotes |
| August 12, 2021 | Pâtisserie Snail | Snail's House | Cachettenotes |
| November 7, 2021 | SUPERGIRL | Snail's House | Cachettenotes |
| December 22, 2021 | Christmas of Wandering Ghost | Snail's House | Cachettenotes |
| December 29, 2021 | Cosmic Air Ride | Snail's House | GUMIKUMA Records |
| January 28, 2022 | DREAMY BEACH | Snail's House | Cachettenotes |
| April 23, 2022 | Biscuit Funk | Snail's House | Cachettenotes |
| June 11, 2022 | Astrogirl | Snail's House | Hololive Production |
| July 23, 2022 | PIXELIZE | Snail's House | |
| September 22, 2022 | ujbeats vol.2 | Snail's House | |
| October 23, 2022 | Restart! | Snail's House | |
| December 10, 2022 | Cherry | Snail's House | |
| February 3, 2023 | Lumi | Snail's House | |
| July 19, 2023 | Fashionista | Snail's House | |
| August 26, 2023 | エイリアン☆ポップ IV (Alien☆Pop IV) | Snail's House | |
| March 23, 2024 | Sound Traveller | Snail's House | |
| May 18, 2024 | PIXELIZE II | Snail's House | |
| November 23, 2024 | utakata | Snail's House | |
| March 23, 2025 | エイリアン☆ポップ V (Alien☆Pop V) | Snail's House | |
| July 23, 2025 | ujbeats: summer | Snail's House | |
| July 15, 2026 | SUNNY | Snail's House | |
