= Planet's Mad =

Studio album by Baauer
- Released: June 19, 2020
- Length: 39:43
- Label: LuckyMe

Baauer chronology
Aa (2016)	Planet's Mad (2020)

Singles from Planet's Mad
- 1. "Planet's Mad" Released: April 8, 2020

Professional ratings
Aggregate scores
Source	Rating
Metacritic	74/100
Review scores
Source	Rating
Allmusic	4/5 stars
Exclaim!	7/10
The Line of Best Fit	9/10
MusicOMH	4.5/5 stars
Pitchfork	6.8/10
Slant Magazine	3/5 stars

Planet's Mad is the second studio album by American DJ and producer Baauer. It was originally scheduled for release on June 3, 2020, but got pushed back to June 19, 2020 due to the COVID-19 pandemic and George Floyd protests.

== Critical reception ==
Planet's Mad was met with generally favorable reviews from critics. At Metacritic, which assigns a weighted average rating out of 100 to reviews from mainstream publications, this release received an average score of 74, based on 7 reviews.

== Track listing ==
Planet's Mad track listing
No.	Title	Length
1.	"Planck"	3:41
2.	"Planet's Mad"	2:54
3.	"Magic"	3:44
4.	"Yehoo"	3:22
5.	"Pizzawala"	2:46
6.	"Reachupdontstop"	4:00
7.	"Hot 44"	4:26
8.	"Aether"	4:01
9.	"Cool One Seven One"	4:16
10.	"Remina"	0:56
11.	"Home" (featuring Bipolar Sunshine)	2:50
12.	"Group"	2:47
Total length:		39:43

Japanese bonus track
No.	Title	Length
13.	"Jeez"	3:42
Total length:		42:25
