= The Square (group) =

- Origin: Lewisham, London, England
- Genres: Grime
- Instrument: Vocals (MC)
- Years active: 2012–present
- Label: No Hats No Hoods Records
- Members: Blakie; DeeJillz; Elf Kid; Faultsz; Lolingo; Streema; Deema
- Past members: Dee Cee; Grandmixxer; Hilts; Novelist; Syder Sides

The Square is an English grime music crew from Lewisham, London. The group was founded by DeeJillz, Elf Kid, Lolingo and Novelist. The group has since expanded with all members hailing from Lewisham and surrounding areas of South London. The crew is known for its youthfulness, adherence to an old school grime sound as well as for the distinct individual styles of its MCs.

== History ==
The group originally consisted of four members who met at the age of 15, members included: DeeJillz, Elf Kid, Novelist and Lolingo. The first collaborative material from Elf Kid, DeeJillz and Novelist was released in early 2012 and predates the name The Square. By early 2013 the group had expanded to include three further MCs, Syder Sides, Faultsz and Streema. In June 2013 a bootleg mixtape was released featuring the original seven members of the crew. In late 2013 the crew began to make frequent pirate radio appearances alongside DJ Grandmixxer. Following on from this in late 2014 the crew officially released its first record, 'The Formula' with No Hats No Hoods records. The EP featured one collaborative track, "Pengaleng" as well as solo tracks from all members of the group. Later in 2014, "Pengaleng" was re-recorded with additional verses from new crew members Hilts and DeeCee. A music video was recorded for the new version of the song which was named as one of the best tracks of 2014 by Complex UK. In April 2015, highly anticipated single "Lewisham McDeez" was released, again with No Hats No Hoods records. Local paper, the News Shopper reported that the Lewisham McDonald's in question had been "immortalised in the Grime world" due to the popularity of the song.

In early 2015, Blakie, General Courts and Grandmixxer joined the crew. In 2015, the group received funding from PRS for Music to produce a debut album. On 1 September 2015, Novelist left The Square to further his solo career. DeeCee and Hilts subsequently announced their departures from the group on 7 September and 27 September respectively. On 19 December Syder Sides left the group and Faultsz also subsequently announced his departure on Boxing Day. However Faultsz rejoined the crew in May 2016.

On 9 May 2016, grime documentist Simon Wheatley announced he had made a documentary about the crew called "Golden Boys" after Elf Kid and Lolingo's 2015 single "Golden Boy". On 25 May 2016, Noisey premiered the first track from the crew's debut album "Defeat Us".

== Members ==
=== Current members ===
- DeeJillz – MC (2012–present)
- Elf Kid – MC (2012–present)
- Lolingo - DJ, producer (2012–present)
- Streema – MC, producer (2013–present)
- Blakie – MC, producer (2015–present)
- Faultsz – MC (2013–2015, 2016–present)
- Deema – MC (2016–present)

=== Past members ===
- Novelist – MC, producer (2012–2015)
- Grandmixxer – DJ, Producer (2014–2015)
- Dee Cee – MC (2014–2015)
- Hilts (also known as Murkilla) – MC, producer (2014–2015)
- Syder Sides – MC (2013–2015)

== Discography ==
=== Singles ===
Title	Details
Pengaleng	Released: December 2014; Label: No Hats No Hoods; Formats: Digital download
Lewisham McDeez	Released: April 2015; Label: No Hats No Hoods; Formats: Digital download
Defeat Us	Released: July 2016; Label: No Hats No Hoods; Formats: Digital download

=== EPs ===
Title	Details
The Formula	Released: 25 August 2014; Label: No Hats No Hoods; Formats: Digital download

=== Bootlegs ===
Title	Details
Introducing: The Square	Released: June 2013; Formats: Digital download
