= Your Drums, Your Love =

Single by AlunaGeorge

from the album Body Music
- Released: 10 September 2012
- Recorded: 2012
- Genre: Electropop; R&B
- Length: 3:37
- Label: Island
- Songwriters: Aluna Francis; George Reid
- Producer: George Reid

AlunaGeorge singles chronology
| "After Light" (2012) | "Your Drums, Your Love" (2012) | "White Noise" (2013) |

"Your Drums, Your Love" is a song from the English electronic music duo AlunaGeorge. The track was released in the United Kingdom on 10 September 2012 as the second single from the duo's first studio album, Body Music (2013).

== Critical reception ==
The track was met with very positive reviews upon its release. Pitchfork labeled it "Best New Music" and wrote, "But the new AlunaGeorge single, "Your Drums, Your Love", is the work of a pair inhabiting a widescreen space while keeping peculiar production touches intact." Dan Stubbs of NME, who praised: "Remember on the Peanuts cartoons when an adult spoke and it sounded like someone talking through a trumpet? That’s a bit like the weird computery voice singing the title line on this new track from ’90s R&B-indebted London duo AlunaGeorge. Unfortunately, it’s such a good effect it makes the human singing that follows sound a bit boring."

== Track listing ==
Digital EP
| No. | Title | Length |
|---|---|---|
| 1. | "Your Drums, Your Love" | 3:37 |
| 2. | "Your Drums, Your Love" (Lil Silva Remix) | 4:44 |
| 3. | "Your Drums, Your Love" (Duke Dumont Remix) | 5:42 |
| 4. | "Your Drums, Your Love" (The Prototypes Remix Radio Edit) | 3:12 |
| 5. | "Your Drums, Your Love" (Deebs Remix Edit) | 3:36 |

== Chart performance ==
For the chart week dated 20 October 2012, "Your Drums, Your Love" debuted at number fifty on the UK Singles Chart - thus marking the duo's second chart appearance following "After Light" (number 173, 2012).

== Charts ==
| Chart (2012) | Peak position |
|---|---|
| Belgium (Ultratip Bubbling Under Flanders) | 25 |
| Belgium Dance (Ultratop Flanders) | 31 |
| Belgium Urban (Ultratop Flanders) | 35 |
| Belgium (Ultratip Bubbling Under Wallonia) | 21 |
| Belgium Dance (Ultratop Wallonia) | 41 |
| Scotland Singles (OCC) | 98 |
| UK Singles (OCC) | 50 |
| UK Urban (Official Charts Company) | 9 |

== Release history ==
| Region | Date | Format |
|---|---|---|
| United Kingdom | 10 September 2012 | Digital EP |
