= Baauer =

American record producer

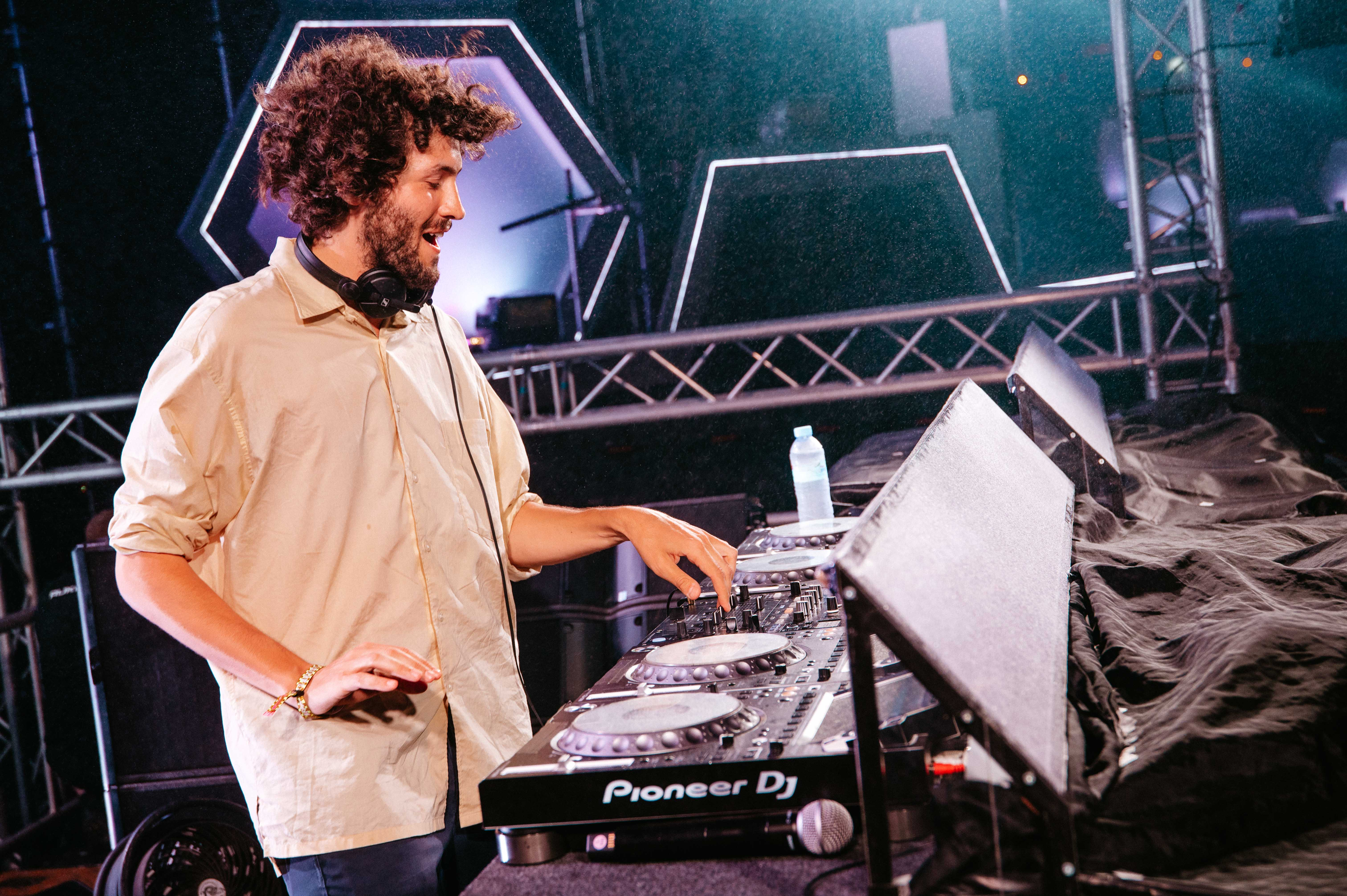
- Baauer at S2O Thailand 2023

Background information
- Born: Harry Bauer Rodrigues; April 30, 1989 (age 37); Philadelphia, Pennsylvania, U.S.
- Genres: EDM; trap; hip hop; grime; bass
- Occupations: Record producer, DJ
- Years active: 2011–present
- Labels: WeDidIt; LuckyMe; Jeffries
- Website: baauer.com

Harry Bauer Rodrigues (born April 30, 1989), known professionally as Baauer, is an American record producer and DJ, best known for his double platinum song "Harlem Shake".

He has produced varied dance music from the age of 13 and previously produced a track under the name “Captain Harry” which received support on BBC Radio 1. His early releases as Baauer around 2012 were part of an emerging sub genre of electronic music known as trap, alongside acts like TNGHT, RL Grime, Rustie and Flosstradamus.

Baauer has produced songs for Just Blaze, Pusha T, Tom Morello and G-Dragon amongst others. He has created official remixes for Nero, The Prodigy, Flosstradamus, No Doubt, Missy Elliott, Disclosure, Kodak Black and Gorillaz. Baauer's music has been used in a number of blockbuster films including Hunger Games: Mockingjay, Red Sparrow and Logan.

In 2016, he released his debut album, Aa. His second album Planet's Mad was released on June 19, 2020. Planet's Mad received a nomination for Best Dance/Electronic Album in the 2021 Grammy Awards.

== Background ==
Baauer was born in Philadelphia, Pennsylvania, and grew up in Germany, London, and Connecticut. He graduated from Staples High School before attending college in New York. He is of Portuguese and Jewish descent.

== Career ==
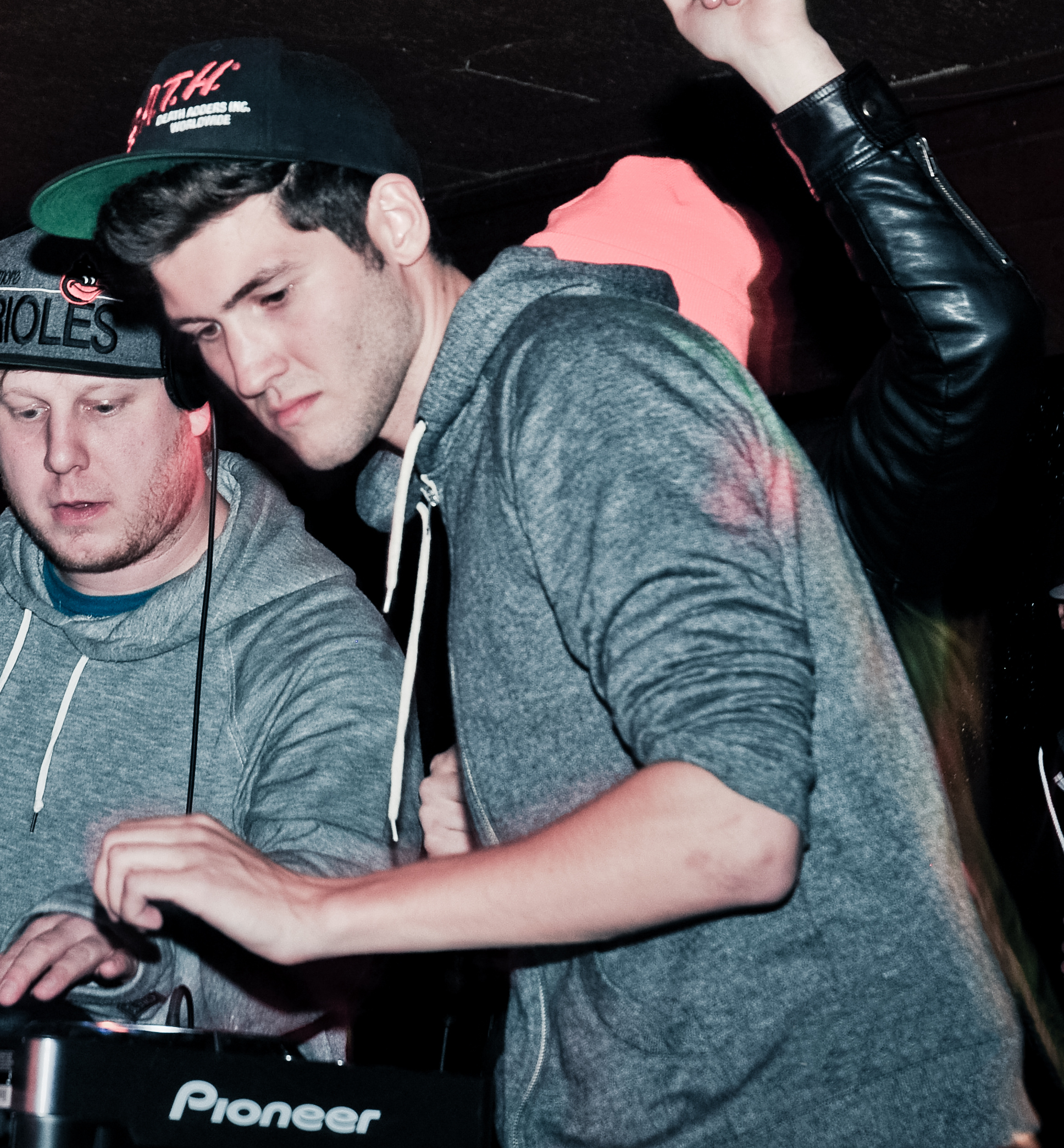
Baauer performing in 2012

=== "Harlem Shake" ===
His first official single "Harlem Shake", was released on Mad Decent subsidiary Jeffrees as a free giveaway offered via SoundCloud on May 22, 2012. It was first played by Rustie in his BBC Radio 1 essential mix before being given Pitchfork's Best New Track distinction. The rapper El-P recorded a freestyle over the track for Pitchfork TV.

In the months following, online comedian and musician George Miller, known by his stage name Joji, recorded a video dancing to the song with his friends, which consequently grew into a YouTube viral video sensation as thousands of fans, artists, personalities and brands filmed their own versions to the track. Key videos were recorded by Good Morning America and The Simpsons.

After a change to the Billboard chart rules in 2013, "Harlem Shake" became the first US number 1 produced exclusively by streaming. YouTube produced an Easter egg customisation for the song, where their user interface would appear to shake at the start of the first verse. "Harlem Shake" is certified double platinum in the United States. At the time of releasing his debut album Aa in 2016, Baauer, Adele and Drake held the record for top streams achieved in a week. "Harlem Shake" won Dance Song of the Year and EDM Song of the Year at the 2013 Billboard Music Awards.

=== First EPs ===
In August 2012 Baauer signed to the LuckyMe record label and released his debut EP Dum Dum, and in 2014 the follow-up EP ß.

=== Aa ===
Baauer released his debut album, Aa (pronounced "double a") via LuckyMe on March 18, 2016. It has guest features by Future, G-Dragon, Leikeli47, M.I.A., Novelist, Pusha T, Rustie, Tirzah and TT the Artist. The album was announced by Stephen Colbert on The Late Show on January 27, 2016; Baauer's performance subverted the format of conventional late night TV performances as he sat on the guest sofa and pressed spacebar on his laptop to queue the live performance of rapper Leikeli47. LuckyMe partnered with Apple Music to create and distribute music videos for Aa by Hiro Murai.

=== 2016 ===
In addition to his debut album in 2016 Baauer also scored a catwalk show for Alexander Wang and played parties for the fashion designer in New York alongside G-Dragon of the K-pop act Big Bang. He also featured as a model in the "Wangang" campaign. Also in 2016, Baauer's track "Horns" soundtracked Budweiser's Super Bowl campaign.

=== 2018 ===
In 2018, he released four standalone singles, "3AM" featuring AJ Tracey & Jae Stephens on July 12. Followed by "Hate Me", featuring virtual influencer Lil Miquela on August 17. Baauer appeared on Spotify's Times Square Billboard in promotion of the track. This was followed on October 23 by "Company" featuring Soleima, which premiered with Zane Lowe on Apple Music. The video by Jonathan Zawada premiered with Pitchfork. Baauer then released "Tep Tep" on December 13 as part of the LuckyMe advent calendar series.

Also in 2018, Baauer composed the music for the second season of the Marvel/Netflix series Iron Fist.

=== 2019 ===
In 2019 he featured on two songs on Rico Nasty's Anger Management mixtape, alongside the Atlanta hip hop duo Earth Gang. The tracks were co-produced by Kenny Beats.

Baauer's music was also featured in numerous campaigns and video games this year, including FIFA 20 and with an original song for Grand Theft Auto Online alongside Danny Brown and Channel Tres. Baauer's track "GoGo!" was used in a 2018 trailer for the League of Legends European Championship. His track "3AM" was later featured as theme music on KSI's YouTube.

=== Planet's Mad ===
In 2020 Baauer announced his second album Planet's Mad for release on June 5, 2020, via LuckyMe. It was later delayed to June 19, 2020. He announced the title track as the first single with an animated video directed by Actual Objects Studio, receiving a Vimeo Staff Pick. "Planet's Mad" was also used in a Vauxhall car commercial.

=== U ===
In April 2026, he announced his album U, scheduled to release on June 12, 2026.

The first single for the album was "Better", released on April 21, 2026. On May 20, 2026, Baauer released "Supersonic" and "U Give Me Love" as dual singles. On June 10 2026, two days before the release of the album, "Calling Out For U" and "Somebody" were also released as dual singles.

U was released June 12, 2026 alongside a full-length album visualizer.

== Discography ==
=== Studio albums ===
List of studio albums, with selected chart positions shown
Title	Album details	Peak chart positions
Title	Album details	AUS
Aa	Released: March 18, 2016; Label: LuckyMe; Formats: CD, digital download, streaming	52
Planet's Mad	Released: June 19, 2020; Label: LuckyMe; Formats: CD, LP, digital download, streaming	—
U	Released: June 12, 2026; Label: LuckyMe; Formats: CD, LP, digital download, streaming	
"—" denotes an album that did not chart or was not released.

=== Extended plays ===
List of extended plays
Title	EP details
Dum Dum	Released: September 25, 2012; Label: LuckyMe; Formats: Digital download
ß	Released: October 27, 2014; Label: LuckyMe; Formats: Digital download

=== Singles ===
==== As lead artist ====
List of singles as lead artist, with selected chart positions and certifications, showing year released and album name
Title	Year	Peak chart positions										Certifications	Album
Title	Year	US	AUS	AUT	BEL (FL)	CAN	IRL	NLD	NZ	SWI	UK	Certifications	Album
"Iced Up" (featuring BHB)	2011	—	—	—	—	—	—	—	—	—	—		Non-album singles
"Samurai"	2011	—	—	—	—	—	—	—	—	—	—		Non-album singles
"Harlem Shake"	2012	1	1	9	2	6	5	4	1	5	3	RIAA: 2× Platinum; ARIA: 2× Platinum; BEA: Gold; BPI: Silver; RMNZ: Platinum	Non-album singles
"Dum Dum"	2012	—	—	—	—	—	—	—	—	—	—		Non-album singles
"Higher" (with Just Blaze featuring Jay-Z)	2013	— (Note: "Higher" did not enter the Billboard Hot 100, but reached number 72 on the Digital Song Sales chart.)	91	—	—	—	—	—	—	—	82		Non-album singles
"Infinite Daps" (with RL Grime)	2013	—	—	—	—	—	—	—	—	—	—		Non-album singles
"One Touch" (featuring AlunaGeorge and Rae Sremmurd)	2014	—	—	—	79	—	—	—	—	—	—		ß
"GoGo!"	2015	—	—	—	—	—	—	—	—	—	—		Aa
"Cantina Boy"	2016	—	—	—	—	—	—	—	—	—	—		Star Wars Headspace
"Day Ones" (featuring Novelist and Leikeli47)	2016	—	—	—	—	—	—	—	—	—	—		Aa
"Kung Fu" (featuring Pusha T and Future)	2016	—	—	—	—	—	—	—	—	—	—		Aa
"Temple" (featuring M.I.A. and G-Dragon)	2016	—	—	—	—	—	—	—	—	—	—		Aa
"How Can You Tell When It's Done?" (with C.Z.)	2016	—	—	—	—	—	—	—	—	—	—		Non-album singles
"Paauer"	2016	—	—	—	—	—	—	—	—	—	—		Non-album singles
"Night Out" (featuring Chaki Zulu, Kepha, JB, kZm and Petz)	2016	—	—	—	—	—	—	—	—	—	—		Non-album singles
"18" (with Kris Wu, Rich Brian, Joji and Trippie Redd)	2018	—	—	—	—	—	—	—	—	—	—		Non-album singles
"MDR" (with Party Favor)	2018	—	—	—	—	—	—	—	—	—	—		Non-album singles
"3AM" (with AJ Tracey and Jae Stephens)	2018	—	—	—	—	—	—	—	—	—	—	BPI: Silver	Non-album singles
"Hate Me" (with Miquela)	2018	—	—	—	—	—	—	—	—	—	—		Non-album singles
"Company" (featuring Soleima)	2018	—	—	—	—	—	—	—	—	—	—		Non-album singles
"Planet's Mad"	2020	—	—	—	—	—	—	—	—	—	—		Planet's Mad
"Magic"	2020	—	—	—	—	—	—	—	—	—	—		Planet's Mad
"Aether"	2020	—	—	—	—	—	—	—	—	—	—		Planet's Mad
"Reachupdontstop"	2020	—	—	—	—	—	—	—	—	—	—		Planet's Mad
"Ddokbokki" (with Omega Sapien)	2021	—	—	—	—	—	—	—	—	—	—		Non-album singles
"Fallaway" (with RL Grime as Hærny)	2021	—	—	—	—	—	—	—	—	—	—		Non-album singles
"Love in the Music"	2021	—	—	—	—	—	—	—	—	—	—		Non-album singles
"All My Ladies"	2024	—	—	—	—	—	—	—	—	—	—		TBA
"Better"	2026												U
"Supersonic"	2026												U
"U Give Me Love"	2026												U
"Calling Out For U"	2026												U
"Somebody"	2026												U
"Gravity" (with Kučka)	2026												U
"—" denotes a recording that did not chart or was not released in that territory.

==== As featured artist ====
List of singles as featured artist, with selected chart positions, showing year released and album name
Title	Year	Peak chart positions		Album
Title	Year	KOR	KOR Billboard	Album
"Coup d'Etat" (G-Dragon featuring Diplo and Baauer)	2013	5	15	Coup D'Etat
"Just Enough" (Holly featuring Baauer)	2020	—	—	Dark Skies & Holy Grail
"—" denotes a recording that did not chart or was not released.

=== Remixes ===
2012

- Krueger – "Talk" (Baauer Remix)
- Abel – "Girls" (Baauer Remix)
- Obey City – "Neva Knew" (Baauer Remix)
- Flosstradamus – "Rollup" (Baauer Remix)
- Ryan Hemsworth – "Slurring" (Baauer Remix)
- No Doubt – Settle Down" (Baauer Remix)
- Nero – "Won't You (Be There)" (Baauer Remix)
- The Prodigy – "Mindfields" (Baauer Remix)
- Brick + Mortar – "Move to the Ocean" (Baauer Remix)
- First Aid Kit – "Winter Is All Over You" (Baauer Remix)

2013

- AlunaGeorge – "Attracting Flies" (Baauer Remix)
- Disclosure featuring Eliza Doolittle – "You & Me" (Baauer Remix)

2014

- What So Not and RL Grime – "Tell Me" (Baauer Edit)

2015

- James Newton Howard featuring Jennifer Lawrence – "Deep in the Meadow" (Baauer Remix)
- Shlohmo – "Ten Days of Falling" (Baauer Remix)

2017

- Flume – "Numb & Getting Colder" (Baauer Remix)
- Gorillaz – "Saturnz Barz" (Baauer Remix)
- alt-J – "In Cold Blood" (Baauer Remix)

2019

- Holly – "Strip Money" (Baauer Remix)

2021

- Alice Longyu Gao featuring Mura Masa and Bülow – "She Abunai" (Baauer Remix)
- A. G. Cook – "Beautiful Superstar" (Baauer Remix)
