= Rustie =

Scottish musician from Glasgow

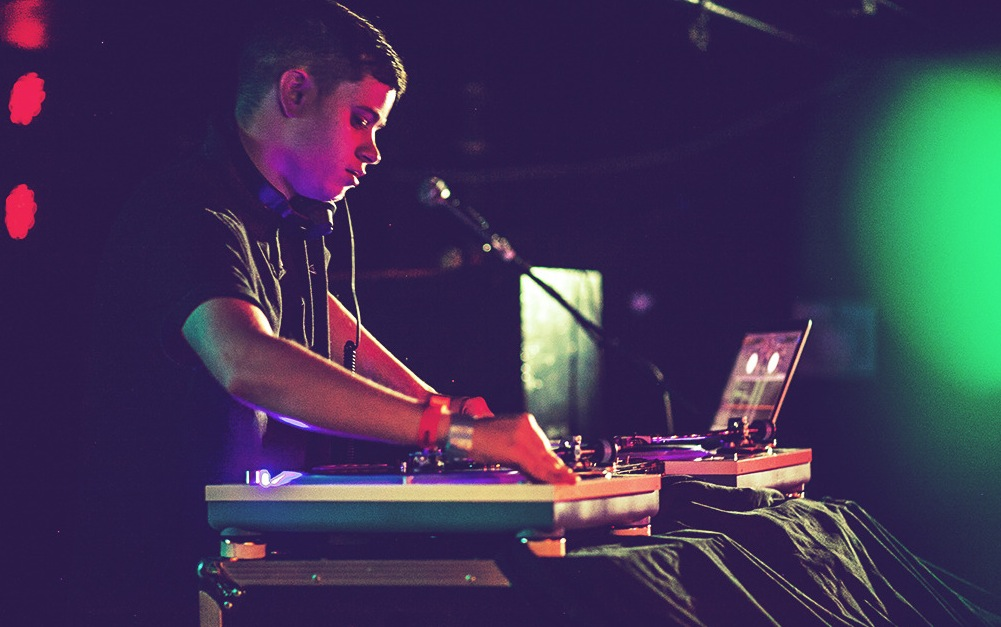

Background information
- Also known as: Rustie Russ
- Born: Russell Whyte; 4 January 1983 (age 43)
- Origin: Pollokshields, Glasgow, Scotland
- Genres: Electronic; future bass; UK bass; purple sound; post-dubstep; trap
- Occupations: Producer, musician
- Instruments: Computers, guitar
- Years active: 2007–2015, 2024–present
- Labels: Warp, Numbers, Wireblock, Stuffrecords

Rustie (born Russell Whyte, 4 January 1983) is a Scottish musician from Glasgow. He is associated with the Numbers label collective and first received attention for his 2007 EP Jagz the Smack. He signed to Warp Records in 2009. His 2011 debut album Glass Swords won him widespread acclaim. His music blends disparate genres, including hip hop, rave, and electronic trap.

== History ==
=== Early career ===
Rustie's first instrument was guitar and he bought his first decks at age 15. He is associated with the subgenre of aquacrunk, a genre described as an experimental offshoot of hip hop that emphasises slowed down, low-slung beats, with lashings of electronic mutterings and morphing basslines. He believes his work conveys movement and fluidity, and that his creative process is an "immersive world" wrapped up in sound, rhythm, and color. Rustie's long-time interest in video games has influenced his approach to electronic composition.

Rustie's first singles were released in 2007 and 2008.

=== Glass Swords (2010–2014) ===
The producer signed with Warp Records in 2010 for the release of Sunburst EP. In 2011, Rustie released his first album Glass Swords on Warp Records. Widely celebrated for its meditation on everything from grime and hip-hop, to sci-fi computer games, and even prog rock, Brad LaBonte of Dusted Magazine wrote "Glass Swords contains some of the freshest, most exciting electronic dance music I've heard this year. Put simply, nothing sounds like this record." Where as Rolling Stone proclaimed it "one of the most thrilling electronic albums of the decade."

In 2012, "After Light" from Glass Swords was included in an Adidas television advertisement featuring British track and field athlete Jessica Ennis prior to the 2012 Olympic Games. Three tracks from Glass Swords ("After Light", "Ultra Thizz" and "Surph") were used in the soundtrack to the video game Sleeping Dogs.

The same year, Glass Swords won The Guardian's First Album Award. Rustie also contributed a mix to BBC Radio 1's Essential Mix.

=== Green Language and Evenifyoudontbelieve (2014–2015) ===
Rustie released his second album, Green Language, on 26 August 2014 on Warp Records. In a review of the album, Pitchfork proclaimed that "Part of Rustie's genius is the way he spun so many sounds and ideas into a bright, high-energy electro-funk whose central contradiction—brittle in sound, pliant in structure—turned out to be visionary." Two tracks from the album, 'Raptor' and 'Attak (feat. Danny Brown)', received "best new track" awards by Pitchfork. Following the release, a second single, "Lost" (feat. Redinho), was premiered by Zane Lowe on BBC Radio 1.

After a show for XOYO Loves at London's Coronet Theatre on 29 November 2014 featuring special guest, rapper Danny Brown, Rustie announced his upcoming 2015, 'Green Language Live' world tour. The 'Green Language' tour is his largest to date and featured dates across Europe, Australia, the USA and Korea. The events showcased immersive 3D visuals by A-Rock including lost Egyptian artefacts, swarms of birds amongst other extravagant effects.

Previously, Whyte has played live with collaborators; Redinho at his album launch party hosted at London's Oval Space on 18 September 2014, production/vocal duo AlunaGeorge, and Koreless.

On 6 April 2015, Rustie announced the next North American leg of his Green Language World Tour. It included stops at a number of festivals with performances at Sasquatch, Bonnaroo, Firefly and Governors Ball.

At the beginning of November 2015, Rustie announced that his third album, Evenifudontbelieve, would be released on 5 November. In his review in The Fader, Selim Bulut wrote; "I want to join the cult of Rustie... On his new album EVENIFUDONTBELIEVE, the electronic producer has created a secular gospel. Is it possible to download someone’s consciousness as an album? I don't know if I believe in that, but I definitely believe in Rustie." Evenifudontbelieve was released via Warp Records, having made two of the singles taken from the album, "First Mythz" and "Peace Upzzz" available for stream only days prior to the release.

Late November 2015, saw Rustie take part in a live Q&A with fans on Reddit, answering questions on a range of subjects including his production techniques, his influences and previous collaborations.

=== Hiatus (2015–2024) ===
In the midst of Evenifudontbelieve's release cycle and tour, Whyte announced that he would be cancelling all concerts "due to addiction and mental health problems".

After seven years of silence, Sub Club hosted Rustie and other artists in collaboration with the Glasgow label, Numbers, on 2 December 2022.

=== Return to music (2024–present) ===
On June 4, 2024, Whyte released his first single in nine years, "Black Ice Mudra", on Warp Records. This was followed by the singles "Thornzz" and "Draoidh", also released on Warp.

In 2026 he began releasing tracks independently without prior announcement. The first track was "Athanasia", followed by "Amentet", "Trizkel Sun", "Arora", "Psion" and "Draíccfuíl".

== Production ==
As well as his own material, Whyte has produced three tracks for Danny Brown's 2013 album Old. In 2015, he produced the Kano single "Hail".

== Personal life ==
At the age of 15, Whyte was diagnosed with type 1 diabetes.

== Discography ==
=== Studio albums ===
Title	Album details
Glass Swords	Released: 10 October 2011; Label: Warp; Formats: CD, digital download
Green Language	Release: 26 August 2014; Label: Warp
Evenifudontbelieve	Release: 5 November 2015; Label: Warp

=== EPs ===
Title	Album details
Jagz The Smack	Released: 15 July 2007; Label: Stuffrecords; Formats: digital download
Cafe De Phresh (with 215 The Freshest Kids)	Released: 12 May 2008; Label: Stuffrecords; Formats: 12", digital download
Bad Science	Released: 31 August 2009; Label: Wireblock; Formats: 12", digital download
Sunburst	Released: 1 October 2010; Label: Warp Records; Formats: 12", CD, digital download

=== Singles ===
Year	Title	Peak chart positions	Album	Label
Year	Title	UK	Album	Label
2008	"Zig-Zag"	—	Bad Science	Wireblock
2008	"Play Doe / Tempered" (with Joker)	—		Kapsize
2011	"All Nite"	—	Glass Swords	Warp Records
2011	"Ultra Thizz"	—	Glass Swords	Warp Records
2012	"Surph" (featuring Nightwave)	—	Glass Swords	Warp Records
2012	"After Light" (featuring AlunaGeorge)	173	Glass Swords	Warp Records
2013	"Triadzz / Slasherr"	—		Numbers.
2014	"Attak" (featuring Danny Brown)	—	Green Language	Warp Records
2014	"Lost" (featuring Redinho)	—	Green Language	Warp Records
2015	"Big Catzz"	—	Evenifudontbelieve	Warp Records
2024	"Black Ice Mudra"	—		Warp Records
2024	"Thornzz"	—		Warp Records
2024	"Draoidh"	—		Warp Records
2026	"Athanasia"	—		Self-released
2026	"Amentet"	—		Self-released
2026	"Trizkel Sun"	—		Self-released
2026	"Arora"	—		Self-released
2026	"Psion"	—		Self-released
2026	"Avatara888"	—		Self-released
2026	"Draíccfuíl"	—		Self-released

"—" denotes single that did not chart.

=== Remixes ===
- "Spliff Dub" by Zomby on Mush / Spliff Dub (2008)
- "Another Day" by Jamie Lidell on Another Day (2008)
- "Let Me See What U Workin With" by Rod Lee on Let Me See What U Workin With (2008)
- "Drama" by Fool on Drama (2008)
- "In This" by Various Production on Versus (2008)
- "In The Blood" by Pivot on In The Blood (2008)
- "The Black Block" by Modeselektor on Happy Birthday! Remixed #2 (2008)
- "No Security" by Crookers feat. Kelis on No Security (2009)
- "Ariel" by Stateless on Ninja Tune XX: 20 Years Of Beats & Pieces (2010)
- "Ariel" (Second version credited as 'Rustie's Pentagram Remake') by Stateless on Ninja Tune XX No. 1 (2010)
- "I'm Gone" by Lazer Sword on Lazer Sword (2010)
- "G41" by 8Bitch on G41 (2010)
- "Dominos" by The Big Pink on Chysalis Music 2010 Coachella (2010)
- "Fancy Forty" by Lunice on Stacker Upper (2010)
- "On My Mind" by Joker (2011)
- "Brand New" by Gucci Mane (2011)
- "Lose Yourself" by Surkin (2012)
- "Love in Motion" by SebastiAn (2012)
- "Ratchet" by Bloc Party on Four (Deluxe Edition) (2013)
- "Trouble on My Mind" by Pusha T feat. Tyler, the Creator via SoundCloud (2013)
- "Back Seat Ho" by Machinedrum (2014)
- "Beautiful" by A. G. Cook (2014)
- "Midnight" by Joker (2014)
- "Hit Da Blokk" by Big Dope P (2015)
- "Where Are Ü Now" by Jack Ü with Justin Bieber (2015)
- "One Last Time" by Baauer feat. Aluna and Brazy (2026)
