= You Know You Like It =

2012 single by AlunaGeorge

Single by AlunaGeorge

from the album Body Music
- B-side: "Just a Touch"; "Put Up Your Hands"
- Released: 20 April 2012
- Recorded: 2011
- Genre: Electropop; R&B
- Length: 3:27 (album version); 3:11 (bondax remix)
- Label: Island; Tri Angle
- Songwriters: Aluna Francis; George Reid
- Producer: George Reid

AlunaGeorge singles chronology
"Analyser" / "We Are Chosen" (2011)	"You Know You Like It" (2012)	"After Light" (2012)

Music video
- "You Know You Like It" by AlunaGeorge on YouTube

"You Know You Like It" is a song by English electronic music duo AlunaGeorge from their debut studio album, Body Music (2013). The track was released in the United Kingdom on 20 April 2012 as the album's lead single. The song peaked at number 39 on the UK Singles Chart in April 2013 after being used in a Tesco advert.

Timed with the release of the album, "You Know You Like It" was re-released on 28 July 2013, as a double A-side with "Bad Idea". It subsequently reached a new peak position of number 39 in the UK Singles Chart on 4 August 2013.

A remix by DJ Snake boosted the song's popularity in the United States, where it became a sleeper hit, peaking at number 13 on the Billboard Hot 100 and reaching number one on both the Billboard Dance/Mix Show Airplay and Rhythmic charts.

== Critical reception ==
The track was met with very positive reviews upon its release. Pitchfork awarded the song their "Best New Music" tag.

== Music video ==
A music video to accompany the release of "You Know You Like It" was first released onto YouTube on August 31, 2011, at a total length of three minutes and thirty seconds. The video is shot in black and white and features clips of Francis dancing.

A second music video was released on June 13, 2013, on YouTube and Vevo. The video shows the duo partying at an empty pool intercut with clips on Francis dancing with backup dancers.

== Track listing ==
Digital download
No.	Title	Length
1.	"You Know You Like It"	3:27
2.	"Just a Touch"	3:13
3.	"Put Up Your Hands"	4:23
4.	"You Know You Like It" (music video)	3:35

== Charts ==
=== Weekly charts ===
Chart (2013–2015)	Peak position
Belgium (Ultratip Bubbling Under Flanders)	35
Belgium Urban (Ultratop Flanders)	46
Belgium (Ultratip Bubbling Under Wallonia)	36
Scottish Singles Sales (Official Charts)	51
UK Singles (Official Charts)	39
UK Dance (Official Charts)	12
UK Urban (OCC)	13
US Hot Dance/Electronic Songs (Billboard)	30

=== Year-end charts ===
Chart (2015)	Position
US Hot Dance/Electronic Songs (Billboard)	93

== Certifications ==
Region	Certification	Certified units/sales
United Kingdom (BPI)	Silver	200,000^{‡}
^{‡} Sales+streaming figures based on certification alone.

== DJ Snake remix ==
"You Know You Like It"
- Cover of remix single by DJ Snake and AlunaGeorge

Single by DJ Snake and AlunaGeorge
- Released: 22 July 2013 (SoundCloud); 14 October 2014 (single)
- Recorded: 2012
- Genre: Trap; electronic
- Length: 4:07
- Label: Island; Interscope; Columbia
- Songwriters: George Reid; Aluna Francis
- Producers: DJ Snake; Tchami; George Reid

DJ Snake singles chronology
"Get Low" (2014)	"You Know You Like It" (2013)	"Lean On" (2015)

AlunaGeorge singles chronology
"Supernatural" (2014)	"You Know You Like It" (2014)	"Automatic" (2015)

Music video
- "You Know You Like It" by DJ Snake & AlunaGeorge on YouTube

French DJ and producer DJ Snake released a remix of the track in 2013. It was uploaded to AlunaGeorge's SoundCloud on July 22, 2013 as an official remix of the song, but was later released as a single on October 14, 2014. This version had significantly more chart success in the United States and Europe than the original single.

=== Music video ===
The music video to accompany the newest version of the song with DJ Snake has a length of 4:33. The video's protagonist is an ostensible humanoid chimpanzee who has thoughts of suicide due to missing the love of his life and not fitting in. Through the video he seems frustrated with his life, stalking the Instagram of his love and selling drugs. He walks to a gentlemen's club carrying a gun. There, he gets a lap dance to forget his worries, but gropes the dancer and gets beaten up by the bouncers. Afterwards he comes to a realization and decides to change his ways. He throws the gun in the garbage.

=== Track listing ===
Digital download
No.	Title	Length
1.	"You Know You Like It"	4:07

=== Charts ===
==== Weekly charts ====
Chart (2015–2016)	Peak position
Australia (ARIA)	11
Australia Dance (ARIA)	4
Austria (Ö3 Austria Top 40)	37
Belgium (Ultratop 50 Flanders)	26
Belgium Dance (Ultratop Flanders)	16
Belgium Urban (Ultratop Flanders)	9
Belgium (Ultratop 50 Wallonia)	19
Belgium Dance (Ultratop Wallonia)	4
Canada Hot 100 (Billboard)	21
Canada CHR/Top 40 (Billboard)	23
Czech Republic Singles Digital (ČNS IFPI)	60
France (SNEP)	22
France Airplay (SNEP)	7
Germany (GfK)	27
Hungary (Stream Top 40)	26
Ireland (IRMA)	73
Netherlands (Dutch Top 40)	24
Netherlands (Single Top 100)	23
New Zealand (Recorded Music NZ)	21
Scottish Singles Sales (Official Charts)	86
Slovakia Airplay (ČNS IFPI)	90
Slovakia Singles Digital (ČNS IFPI)	53
Sweden (Sverigetopplistan)	63
Switzerland (Schweizer Hitparade)	24
UK Singles (Official Charts)	67
UK Dance (Official Charts)	16
US Billboard Hot 100	13
US Hot Dance/Electronic Songs (Billboard)	2
US Adult Pop Airplay (Billboard)	34
US Pop Airplay (Billboard)	7
US Rhythmic Airplay (Billboard)	1

==== Year-end charts ====
Chart (2015)	Position
Australia (ARIA)	73
Belgium (Ultratop Wallonia)	89
Canada (Canadian Hot 100)	75
CIS (Tophit)	75
France (SNEP)	93
Germany (Official German Charts)	85
Netherlands (Dutch Top 40)	92
Netherlands (Single Top 100)	59
Russia Airplay (Tophit)	72
Ukraine Airplay (Tophit)	155
US Billboard Hot 100	59
US Hot Dance/Electronic Songs (Billboard)	4
US Mainstream Top 40 (Billboard)	39
US Rhythmic (Billboard)	18
Chart (2016)	Position
US Hot Dance/Electronic Songs (Billboard)	58

==== Decade-end charts ====
Chart (2010–2019)	Position
US Hot Dance/Electronic Songs (Billboard)	32

=== Certifications ===
Certifications for "You Know You Like It"
Region	Certification	Certified units/sales
Australia (ARIA)	5× Platinum	350,000^{‡}
Belgium (BRMA)	Gold	10,000^{‡}
Brazil (Pro-Música Brasil)	Platinum	60,000^{‡}
Canada (Music Canada)	3× Platinum	240,000^{‡}
Denmark (IFPI Danmark)	Gold	30,000^{^}
Germany (BVMI)	Platinum	400,000^{‡}
Italy (FIMI)	Gold	25,000^{‡}
New Zealand (RMNZ)	3× Platinum	90,000^{‡}
Sweden (GLF)	Platinum	40,000^{‡}
United Kingdom (BPI)	Gold	400,000^{‡}
United States (RIAA)	3× Platinum	3,000,000^{‡}
^{^} Shipments figures based on certification alone.^{‡} Sales+streaming figures based on certification alone.

== Release history ==
Region	Date	Format	Label
United Kingdom	20 April 2012	Digital download	Island
United Kingdom	11 June 2012	Vinyl	Tri Angle
United Kingdom	29 July 2013	Digital download	Island
