= Attracting Flies =

Single by AlunaGeorge

from the album Body Music
- Released: 8 March 2013
- Genre: Synth-pop; electropop
- Length: 3:08
- Label: Island
- Songwriters: Aluna Francis; George Reid
- Producer: George Reid

AlunaGeorge singles chronology
| "White Noise" (2013) | "Attracting Flies" (2013) | "Supernatural" (2014) |

"Attracting Flies" is a song from the English electronic music duo AlunaGeorge. The track was released in the United Kingdom on 8 March 2013 as the third single from their first studio album, Body Music (2013). The song peaked at number 17 on the UK Singles Chart.

== Critical reception ==
The track was met with universal acclaim upon its release. Pitchfork labeled it "Best New Track".

== Music video ==
A music video to accompany the release of "Attracting Flies" was first released onto YouTube on 10 March 2013 at a total length of three minutes and twenty-seven seconds. The video is a play on the song's chorus' line "Little grey fairytales and little white lies". It features Aluna as the protagonists of various well-known fairytales, however each of them have been given a gritty, urban twist. For example, Little Red Riding Hood is being stalked late at night by a man (played by George) and his dog, and Sleeping Beauty passes out after overdosing on anti-depressants.

== Track listing ==
Digital download
| No. | Title | Length |
|---|---|---|
| 1. | "Attracting Flies" | 3:08 |

== Chart performance ==
For the chart week 23 March 2013, "Attracting Flies" debuted at number one-hundred-and-thirty-one on the UK Singles Chart. The following week saw the track rise twenty-two places to number one-hundred-and-nine. On the chart week dated 6 April 2013, the track advanced thirty-fives places to number eighty-four; becoming AlunaGeorge's third top 100 hit after "Your Drums, Your Love" (number 50, 2012) and "White Noise" (number 2, 2013). On its fourth charting week, the track rose a further thirty-three places to number fifty-one, before reaching a new peak of number thirty the following week. The following week after that, it reached number 19.

== Charts ==
=== Weekly charts ===
| Chart (2013) | Peak position |
|---|---|
| Australia Urban (ARIA) | 33 |
| Belgium (Ultratip Bubbling Under Flanders) | 37 |
| Belgium Urban (Ultratop Flanders) | 43 |
| Belgium (Ultratip Bubbling Under Wallonia) | 30 |
| Belgium Dance (Ultratop Wallonia) | 44 |
| Scotland Singles (OCC) | 28 |
| UK Singles (OCC) | 17 |
| UK Urban (Official Charts Company) | 5 |

=== Year-end charts ===
| Chart (2013) | Peak position |
|---|---|
| UK Singles (Official Charts Company) | 151 |

== Certifications ==
| Region | Certification | Certified units/sales |
|---|---|---|
| United Kingdom (BPI) | Silver | 200,000^{‡} |
^{‡} Sales+streaming figures based on certification alone.

== Release history ==
| Region | Date | Format | Label |
|---|---|---|---|
| United Kingdom | 8 March 2013 | Digital download | Island |
