= White Noise (Disclosure song) =

2013 single by Disclosure

Single by Disclosure featuring AlunaGeorge

from the album Settle
- Released: 1 February 2013
- Genre: House; deep house
- Length: 3:37 (radio edit); 4:38 (album version); 5:40 (single version)
- Label: Island
- Songwriters: Howard Lawrence; Guy Lawrence; Aluna Francis; George Reid; James Napier
- Producer: Disclosure

Disclosure singles chronology
"Latch" (2012)	"White Noise" (2013)	"You & Me" (2013)

AlunaGeorge singles chronology
"Your Drums, Your Love" (2012)	"White Noise" (2013)	"Attracting Flies" (2013)

Music video
- "Disclosure – White Noise ft. AlunaGeorge (Official Video)" on YouTube

"White Noise" is a song by British electronic music duo Disclosure, featuring vocals from electronic music duo AlunaGeorge. It was released as a digital download in the United Kingdom on 1 February 2013. The song peaked at number two on the UK Singles Chart. The track is the second single from the duo's debut studio album, Settle (2013). The song was written by Howard Lawrence, Guy Lawrence, Aluna Francis, George Reid and James Napier.

== Reception ==
=== Critical reception ===
The track was met with very positive reviews upon its release. Pitchfork labeled it "Best New Music", while Record of the Day called both artists "the future of British pop music". Robert Copsey of Digital Spy gave the song a positive review stating:

For their latest track 'White Noise' they've hooked up with trendy newbies AlunaGeorge – a savvy collaboration that's been carefully timed following their shared domination of last month's ones-to-watch lists. That's not to say it sounds forced; Disclosure's humming bassline, swirling synths and addictive clubby beeps are perfectly tailored to Aluna's pitched vocal. The result strikes a rarely-heard balance between hipster-friendly and potential chart-dominator..

Freddie Holmes of The Underclassed gave the track a mixed review, stating that "It's a great track nonetheless, especially to someone that hasn't heard any of either group's previous material, but my superfan standpoint has rendered me to be overly critical".

Billboard named it the eighth greatest song of 2013. The website wrote about the song, "In a year in which Disclosure and AlunaGeorge watched their audiences and cultural cache grow exponentially, the two duos' wiry, icy-cool collaboration represented a high point for each".

=== Commercial performance ===
The song entered at number 28 on the UK Singles Chart. The following week, it climbed 26 places to number two on the chart, beaten to the top by "Thrift Shop" by Macklemore & Ryan Lewis, featuring Wanz.

== Live performances ==
At the 2014 BRIT Awards, Disclosure and Lorde performed an electro version of Lorde's song "Royals", which transitioned into "White Noise", for which AlunaGeorge appeared on stage. The "Royals/White Noise" performance was released at iTunes Stores by the BRIT Awards on 19 February 2014; proceeds from its sales went to the charity War Child.

== Music video ==
The music video for White Noise was filmed in Detroit, and follows a security guard assigned to patrol various abandoned buildings. The Detroit skyline is visible in one scene, and another scene features Michigan Central Station prominently.

== Track listings ==
Digital download

1. "White Noise" (featuring AlunaGeorge) – 5:40

BRITs performance digital download

1. "Royals / White Noise" – 4:59

== Charts ==
=== Weekly charts ===
Weekly chart performance
Chart (2013–14)	Peak position
Belgium (Ultratop 50 Flanders)	19
Belgium (Ultratop Flanders Dance)	1
Belgium (Ultratop Wallonia Dance Bubbling Under)	2
Hungary (Rádiós Top 40)	13
Ireland (IRMA)	51
Ireland (IRMA) "Royals"/"White Noise" (Live from the BRITs)	93
New Zealand Artists (Recorded Music NZ) "Royals"/"White Noise" (Live from the BRITs)	9
Scottish Singles Sales (Official Charts)	10
UK Dance (Official Charts)	1
UK Singles (Official Charts)	2
UK Singles (OCC) "Royals"/"White Noise" (Live from the BRITs)	72
US Dance Single Sales	4

=== Year-end charts ===
Annual chart rankings
Chart (2013)	Position
Hungarian Airplay Chart	74
UK Singles (OCC)	29

== Certifications ==
Certifications and sales
Region	Certification	Certified units/sales
New Zealand (RMNZ)	Platinum	30,000^{‡}
United Kingdom (BPI)	3× Platinum	1,800,000^{‡}
^{‡} Sales+streaming figures based on certification alone.

== Release history ==
Street dates
Region	Date	Format	Label
United Kingdom	1 February 2013	Digital download	Island
