= Body Music =

Studio album by AlunaGeorge
- Released: 26 July 2013
- Genres: Synth-pop; R&B
- Length: 50:22
- Label: Island
- Producers: Aluna Francis; George Reid

AlunaGeorge chronology
Body Music (2013)	I Remember (2016)

Singles from Body Music
- 1. "You Know You Like It" Released: 19 April 2012; 2. "Your Drums, Your Love" Released: 10 September 2012; 3. "Attracting Flies" Released: 8 March 2013; 4. "Best Be Believing" Released: 8 November 2013

Body Music is the debut studio album by English electronic music duo AlunaGeorge. It was released on 26 July 2013 by Island Records. The album was supported by four singles: "You Know You Like It", "Your Drums, Your Love", "Attracting Flies" and "Best Be Believing". The album debuted at number 11 on the UK Albums Chart, selling 7,690 copies in its first week. As of September 2016, Body Music had sold 32,137 copies in the United Kingdom.

== Singles ==
"You Know You Like It" was released as the album's lead single on 19 April 2012 by Tri Angle. When reissued on 28 July 2013, by Island Records, the single reached number 39 on the UK Singles Chart.

"Your Drums, Your Love" was released as the second single from the album on 10 September 2012, reaching number 50 on the UK Singles Chart.

The album's third single, "Attracting Flies", was released on 8 March 2013, peaking at number 17 on the UK Singles Chart.

"Best Be Believing" was released on 8 November 2013 as the album's fourth and final single.

== Critical reception ==
Professional ratings
Aggregate scores
Source	Rating
AnyDecentMusic?	6.8/10
Metacritic	73/100
Review scores
Source	Rating
AllMusic	4/5 stars
Financial Times	4/5 stars
The Guardian	4/5 stars
The Independent	4/5 stars
NME	6/10
The Observer	4/5 stars
Pitchfork	7.6/10
Q	3/5 stars
Rolling Stone	3.5/5 stars
Spin	6/10

The album was met with positive reviews from contemporary music critics. The album holds a score of 73/100 on review aggregate website Metacritic, indicating "generally favorable reviews".

== Track listing ==
All tracks are written by Aluna Francis and George Reid, except where noted.

No.	Title	Producer(s)	Length
1.	"Outlines"	Francis; Reid	3:47
2.	"You Know You Like It"	Francis; Reid	3:23
3.	"Attracting Flies"	Francis; Reid	3:09
4.	"Your Drums, Your Love"	Francis; Reid	3:39
5.	"Kaleidoscope Love"	Francis; Reid	3:53
6.	"Bad Idea"	Francis; Reid	3:16
7.	"Diver"	Francis; Reid	3:17
8.	"Lost and Found"	Francis; Reid	4:13
9.	"Best Be Believing" (writers: Francis, Reid, Sam Frank)	Reid	3:45
10.	"Superstar"	Francis; Reid	3:21
11.	"Just a Touch"	Francis; Reid	3:13
12.	"Body Music"	Francis; Reid	4:02
13.	"Friends to Lovers"	Francis; Reid	4:37
14.	"This Is How We Do It" (bonus track) (writers: Montell Jordan, Oji Pierce, Ricky Walters)	Reid	2:47
Total length:			50:22

Deluxe edition bonus tracks
No.	Title	Producer(s)	Length
15.	"We Are Chosen"	Francis; Reid	3:30
16.	"Indestructible"	Francis; Reid	3:16
17.	"Watching Over You"	Francis; Reid	3:25
18.	"Put Up Your Hands"	Francis; Reid	4:22
19.	"B Ur Boo"	Francis; Reid	3:02
Total length:			67:57

Japanese deluxe edition bonus tracks
No.	Title	Length
20.	"Your Drums, Your Love" (Friendly Fires Remix)	4:33
21.	"Attracting Flies" (Baauer Remix)	4:23

Notes

- The UK and German physical deluxe edition switch tracks 17 and 18.

== Personnel ==
Credits adapted from the liner notes of the deluxe edition of Body Music.

AlunaGeorge

- Aluna Francis – vocals (all tracks); production (all except "Best Be Believing" and "This Is How We Do It")
- George Reid – production (all tracks); mixing (on "Watching Over You"); reportage

Additional personnel

- Chris Carmouche – mixing (on "Just a Touch")
- Sam Farr – additional engineering (on "B Ur Boo")
- Fiona Garden – cover art, photography
- Serban Ghenea – mixing (on "You Know You Like It")
- John Hanes – mix engineering (on "You Know You Like It")
- Stuart Hawkes – mastering (all except "Watching Over You")
- Adam Pickard – additional engineering (on "Best Be Believing")
- Mark Rankin – mixing (all except "You Know You Like It", "Just a Touch" and "Watching Over You")
- Stars Redmond – reportage
- Beau Thomas – mastering
- James Trood – additional instrumentation (on "B Ur Boo")

== Charts ==
Chart (2013)	Peak position
Australian Albums (ARIA)	71
Belgian Albums (Ultratop Flanders)	80
Belgian Albums (Ultratop Wallonia)	43
Dutch Albums (Album Top 100)	96
French Albums (SNEP)	85
Irish Albums (IRMA)	43
Scottish Albums (Official Charts)	33
Swiss Albums (Schweizer Hitparade)	81
UK Albums (Official Charts)	11
US Heatseekers Albums (Billboard)	2
US Independent Albums (Billboard)	35
US Top Dance Albums (Billboard)	3

== Release history ==
Region	Date	Format	Edition	Label	Ref.
Australia	26 July 2013	CD; digital download	Standard; deluxe	Universal	
Germany	26 July 2013	CD; digital download	Standard; deluxe	Universal	
Ireland	26 July 2013	CD; digital download	Standard; deluxe	Island	
France	29 July 2013	CD	Deluxe	Barclay	
France	29 July 2013	Digital download	Standard; deluxe	Barclay	
Germany	29 July 2013	LP	Standard	Universal	
United Kingdom	29 July 2013	CD; digital download	Standard; deluxe	Island	
United States	30 July 2013	Digital download	Standard	Vagrant	
Japan	31 July 2013	CD; digital download	Japan standard	Universal	
France	5 August 2013	LP	Standard	Barclay	
Ireland	5 August 2013	LP	Standard	Island	
United Kingdom	5 August 2013	LP	Standard	Island	
United States	27 August 2013	CD	Standard	Vagrant	
