= AlunaGeorge =

British pop music duo

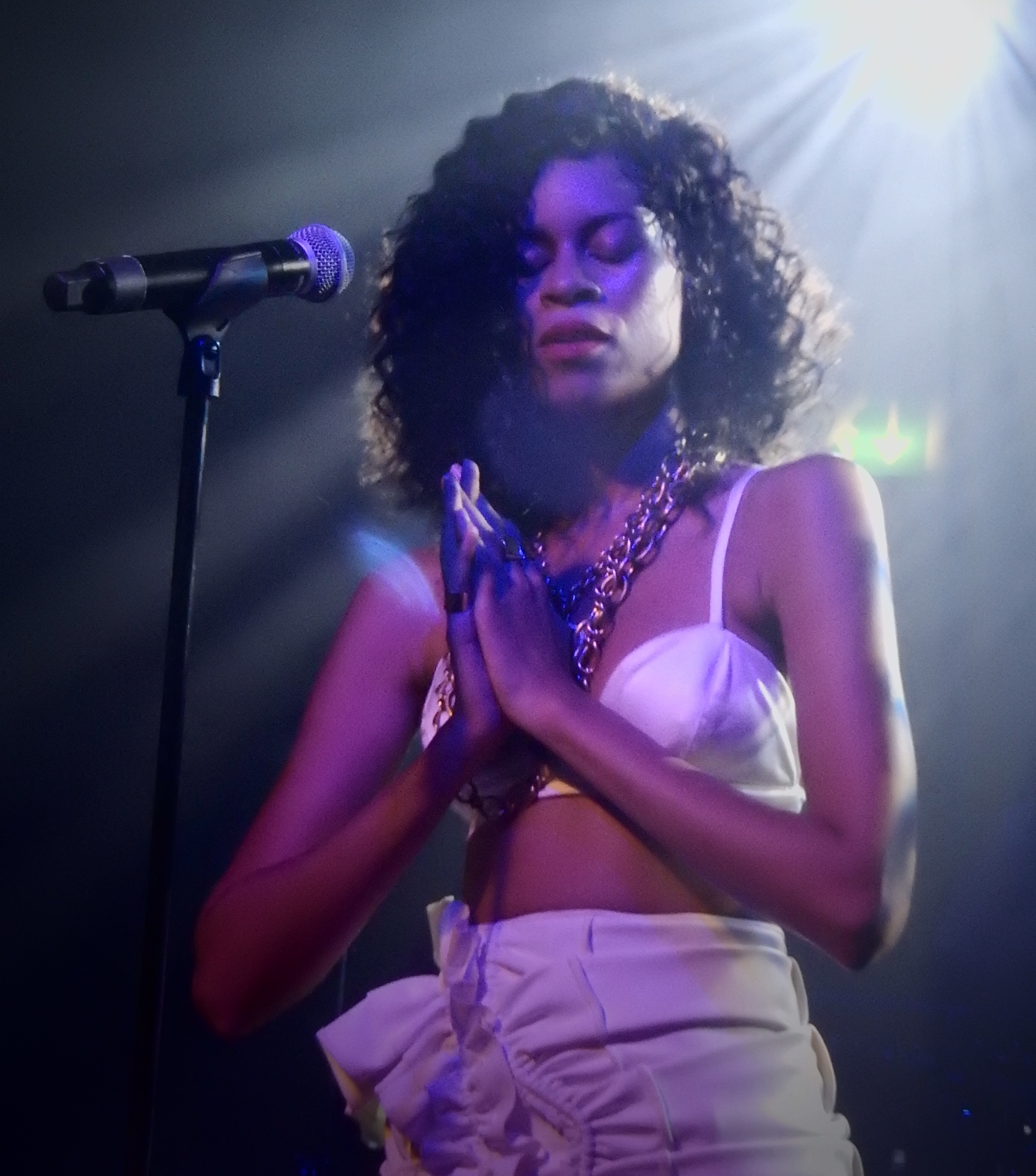
- Aluna Francis of AlunaGeorge performing in June 2016 at Scala in London

Background information
- Origin: London, England
- Genres: Electropop; synth-pop; alternative R&B; contemporary R&B; UK garage
- Years active: 2011–2020 (Note: Indefinite hiatus)
- Labels: Tri Angle; Island; Interscope
- Members: Aluna Francis; George Reid
- Website: alunageorge.com

AlunaGeorge was an English electronic music duo from London, consisting of singer-songwriter Aluna Francis and producer George Reid. Since 2020, the duo has been on indefinite hiatus, allowing both members to pursue solo projects.

== Career ==
=== 2009: Formation ===
The duo first met in June 2009, when Reid remixed Francis' band My Toys Like Me's track "Sweetheart".

=== 2012–2016: Breakthrough and Body Music ===
AlunaGeorge released the single "You Know You Like It" as a digital download on 20 April 2012, followed by a vinyl release on 11 June 2012. The duo's first commercial single, "Your Drums, Your Love", was released on 10 September 2012, debuting at number 50 on the UK Singles Chart. During a visit to BBC Radio 1 on 3 January 2013, AlunaGeorge announced that their debut album would be titled Body Music and released in June 2013, along with the premiere of the full-length version of the song "Diver". On 4 June 2013, the duo unveiled the cover art and track listing for Body Music, and confirmed the album would be released on 29 July 2013.

It was announced in December 2012 that AlunaGeorge had been shortlisted for the 2013 BRIT Award of Critics' Choice. Then, later in December, the BBC announced that the duo had also been nominated for the Sound of 2013 poll, in which they finished in second place.

In February 2013, AlunaGeorge scored their first top-40 entry, a collaboration with Disclosure on "White Noise". The single reached number two on the UK Singles Chart. Huw Stephens also premiered a track from the group on his BBC Radio 1 show titled "Attracting Flies", which was eventually included on their debut album. The duo performed at the Evolution Festival in Newcastle upon Tyne on 27 May 2013.

A collection of previously released and brand new remixes, Body Music Remixed, was released on 16 June 2014. On 3 October 2014 AlunaGeorge released a single called "Supernatural".

On 14 July 2015, it was announced that AlunaGeorge had signed with the American record label Interscope Records.

The duo released the single "I'm in Control", featuring Jamaican artist Popcaan, on 20 January 2016. That same day, Francis revealed in an interview with BBC Radio 1's Annie Mac that the duo's second studio album was titled I Remember, which was set to be released on 16 September 2016 via Island Records in the UK and Interscope Records in the US. AlunaGeorge was an opening act with Miguel for the North American Arena tour of Australian star Sia. The Nostalgic for the Present Tour ran through November 2016.

=== 2017–present: Indefinite hiatus and solo careers ===
In 2017, AlunaGeorge was the main opening act for the European leg of A Head Full of Dreams Tour of the band Coldplay.

In 2020, AlunaGeorge was put on an indefinite hiatus, as Francis announced that she would be releasing music as a solo artist. Francis stated that AlunaGeorge was "definitely still going" and is "on hiatus rather than being over". Her first single, "Body Pump", was released on 30 April 2020. This was followed by her debut solo album Renaissance, which released on 28 August 2020.

In 2023, Francis featured on the Skrillex track "Inhale Exhale" alongside Kito. Later that year, on 7 July, Francis released her second album MYCELiUM. The big promotional track from the album "Running Blind" featuring Tchami and Kareen Lomax counts as her first solo number one on Billboard's Dance Mix/Show Airplay chart as of the week charted October 14, 2023.

== Artistry ==
Aluna's vocals have been described as "almost child-like" as well as being called "sugar sweet" and "emotionally soulful and heartwarming too". George's production combines sounds from bass, garage and dubstep.

The band use techniques of R&B and use "futuristic pop". The musical style has been described as "advanced minimalistic polyrhythmic beats" as well as "bashment, experimental hip-hop, '90's R&B and house". The duo cite inspiration from artists including Flying Lotus, Chris Clark, Hudson Mohawke, Destiny's Child and Mariah Carey; the band also cite James Taylor, Van Morrison, Aaliyah, PJ Harvey, CocoRosie as references.

== Members ==
=== Aluna Francis ===
Aluna Francis was born in Wales on 2 July 1988 to a Jamaican father and an Indian mother. After her parents separated, she was raised in New Jersey and London. Her name “Aluna” means “come here” in the Mwera dialect of Tanzania, “pupil” in Portuguese and “Mother Earth” in Mayan. Before working in the music industry, Francis worked as a reflexologist. Francis' first venture into the music industry came when she sang in a group called My Toys Like Me. In 2013, Francis appeared as a panellist on the BBC music game show Never Mind the Buzzcocks. In July 2019, Francis announced that she was expecting a child by the end of the year. Francis announced on 17 November 2019 via Instagram that she had given birth to a girl named Amaya. At some point, she married, mentioning that she had a husband.

Francis released a solo album, Renaissance on 28 August 2020 through Mad Decent. In January 2022, Francis teamed up with Diplo, Kelli-Leigh, and Italian producer Durante for an indie-dance single called “Forget About Me”, which was nominated for a Grammy. In 2023, Francis featured on the Skrillex track "Inhale Exhale" alongside Kito. Later that year, on 7 July, Francis released her sophomore album, titled MYCELiUM, featuring collaborations with producers such as Route 94, MNEK, Tchami, MK, and Chris Lake.

=== George Reid ===
George Reid was born in 1989. Reid was previously a guitarist in indie-math rock band Colour. He has cited minimal American hip hop by The Neptunes, as well as Lil Wayne, as inspirations. Reid has said his approach to music-making stems from it being "so easy to get lost in software, you get to a point where so many noises might be carrying the song, rather than the song carrying everything else. So that’s my excuse for having nothing in there."

== Discography ==
- Body Music (2013)
- I Remember (2016)

== Awards ==
Year	Award	Category	Work	Result
2013	BRIT Awards	Critics' Choice		Nominated
2013	BBC	Sound of 2013		Second
2013	MOBO Awards	Best Video in association with SBTV	Attracting Flies	Nominated
2013	MOBO Awards	Best Song in Association with PRS for Music	White Noise	Nominated
2013	Popjustice £20 Music Prize	Best British Pop Single	White Noise	Nominated
2013	UK Festival Awards	Anthem of the Summer	White Noise	Nominated
2014	BRIT Awards	Song of the Year	White Noise	Nominated
2014	World Music Awards	World's Best Song	White Noise	Nominated
2015	NME Awards	Best Track	White Noise	Won
2016	Billboard Music Awards	Top Dance/Electronic Song	You Know You Like It	Nominated
