= Jillionaire =

Trinidadian DJ and music producer (born 1978)

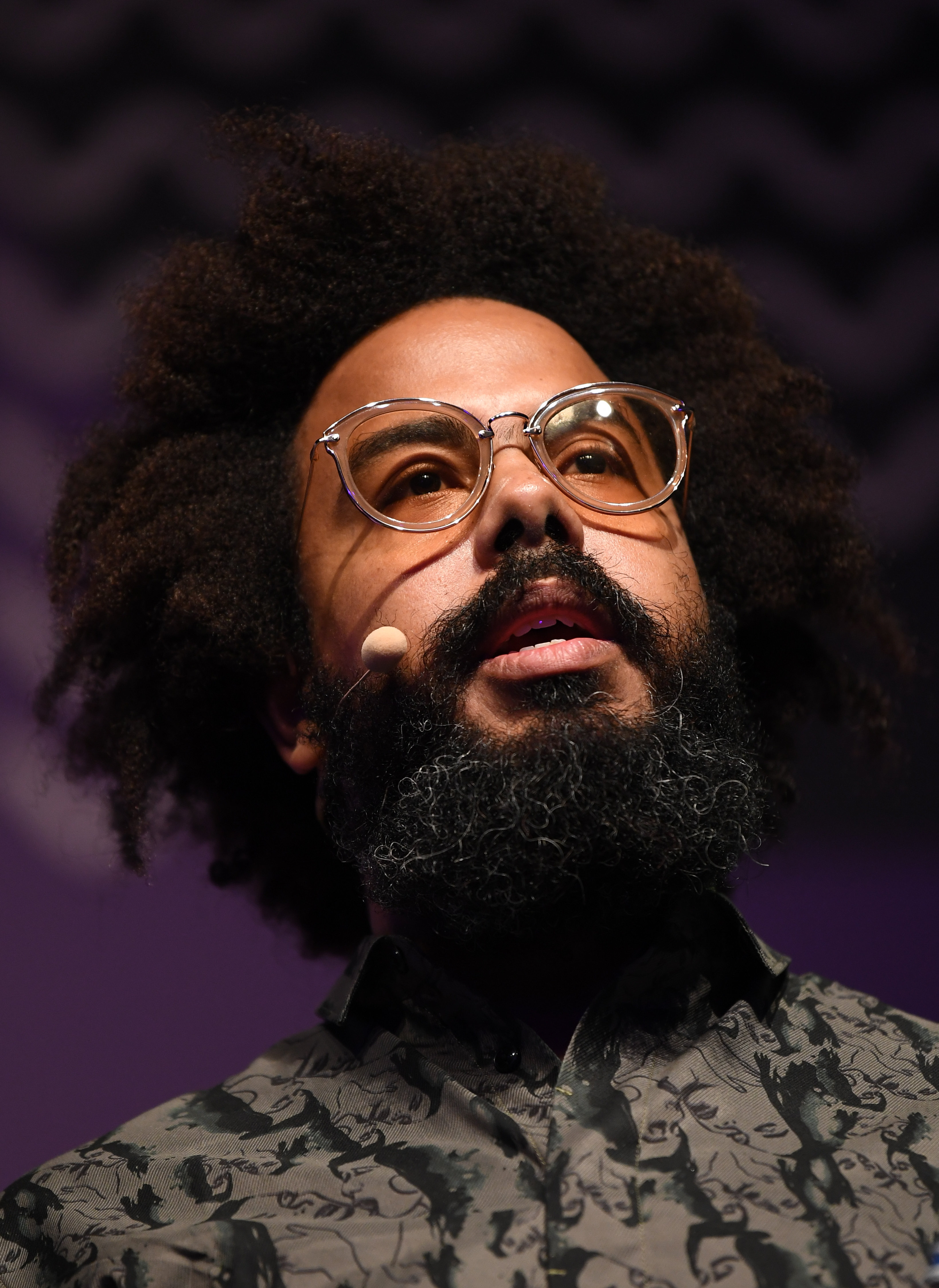
- Jillionaire at 2018 Web Summit

Background information
- Born: Christopher Leacock; 3 April 1978 (age 48)
- Origin: Trinidad and Tobago
- Genres: EDM; soca; dancehall
- Occupations: Producer; DJ
- Years active: 1998–present
- Labels: Mad Decent; Feel Up
- Formerly of: Major Lazer
- Website: soundcloud.com/jillionaire

Christopher Leacock (born 3 April 1978), better known by his stage name Jillionaire, is a Trinidadian DJ and music producer. He is best known for being a former member of the American electronic music group Major Lazer, along with Diplo and Walshy Fire. In 2014 he released then EP Fresh along with Salvatore Ganacci on the Universal Music label.

Jillionaire is credited with creating a unique mix of indie dance and big room house together with the Caribbean rhythms of dancehall and soca. In 2010 he performed at New Zealand's WOMAD Festival. He joined Major Lazer in 2011, along with Walshy Fire, but quit in June 2019 in order to focus on solo projects.

== Major Lazer ==
Major Lazer was originally founded by Switch and Diplo. In 2011 Switch left the group and was replaced by Jillionaire and Walshy Fire. They three released two studio albums and one EP with this lineup: Free the Universe, Apocalypse Soon and Peace Is the Mission. In June 2019, Jillionaire departed Major Lazer to focus on solo projects, with Ape Drums stepping in as his replacement.

== Additional work ==
Jillionaire has contributed to several artists: Salvatore Ganacci on his EP Fresh, with Swick on Ants Nests featuring T.O.K, and with Phat Deuce on FI DI GAL DEM featuring Mr. Lexx. He has a SoundCloud account where he has uploaded most of his solos and contributions.

== Singles ==
=== Main artist ===
- Jillionaire and Salvatore Ganacci featuring Sanjin – "Fresh" (2014)
- Jilionare – "Sunrise" (2017)

=== Featured artist ===
- SAARA ft. Jillionaire – "All the Love" (2017)
- Oryane & Jillionaire ft. Mical Teja – "Ándale" (2021)
