= Disparate Youth =

Single by Santigold

from the album Master of My Make-Believe
- Released: 14 February 2012
- Recorded: 2010–11
- Genre: Dubtronica; electronic rock
- Length: 4:44
- Label: Atlantic
- Songwriters: Ricardo Johnson; Santigold; Nick Zinner
- Producer: Ricky Blaze

Santigold singles chronology
"Car Song" (2012)	"Disparate Youth" (2012)	"The Keepers" (2012)

"Disparate Youth" is a song from American musician Santigold. The track was released in the United States on 14 February 2012 as the lead single from the artist's second studio album, Master of My Make-Believe (2012).

== Critical reception ==
In March 2012, The Guardian heralded "Disparate Youth" as part of their 'New Music' feature. Reviewer Michael Cragg hailed it as "an absolute corker, all sleek new-wave keyboards mixed with frantic bursts of guitar and Santigold's intriguingly emotionless delivery."

== Music video ==
Santigold and filmmaker Sam Fleischner co-directed a "Disparate Youth" music video shot in Portland Parish, Jamaica, which released in March 2012. The video, shot on a shoestring budget, shows Santigold riding a motorcycle through a colonial-era town, riding a speedboat off the coast, and entering a jungle with some young Jamaican locals. Fleischner has revealed that this was the second video shot for the song, following "a Clockwork Orange-inspired video that the label spent a lot of money on" which Santigold decided not to release.

== Use in media ==
In September 2012, "Disparate Youth" became the soundtrack to British insurance company Direct Line's latest television advertisement, it was used in their other adverts until 2014. In October 2012, the song was used in a season four episode of The Vampire Diaries entitled "The Rager". In December 2012, an instrumental version of the song was used by Honda for their television advertisement, "Things Can Always Be Better". Direct Line also utilised the track for a range of commercials between 2012 and 2014. The song is also featured in the video games Forza Horizon and NBA 2K16. It has also been used to advertise YouTube's Geek Week in August 2013. The song was also used in the Netflix original series Atypical, in season one, episode six, during the end credits, and featured in Good Girls. “Disparate Youth” was featured in the 2020 trailer for the Netflix series “Unorthodox.” The Marvel Studios miniseries Ironheart also features the Amateur Best Remix version of the song in its fifth episode.

== Track listing ==
Digital download
No.	Title	Length
1.	"Disparate Youth"	4:44

CD single
No.	Title	Length
1.	"Disparate Youth"	4:44
2.	"Disparate Youth" (Switch Remix)	3:56

Digital EP
No.	Title	Length
1.	"Disparate Youth"	4:44
2.	"Disparate Youth" (Switch Remix)	3:56
3.	"Disparate Youth" (The 2 Bears Remix)	7:42
4.	"Disparate Youth" (Amateur Best Remix)	3:38
5.	"Disparate Youth" (Radio Edit)	3:41
6.	"Disparate Youth" (SWjR & Santigold Remix)	3:37

== Charts ==
For the chart week dated April 21, 2012, "Disparate Youth" debuted at number ninety-six on the UK Singles Chart; marking the artist's second appearance on the chart—following "L.E.S. Artistes" (number 27, 2008).

Chart (2012–13)	Peak position
Austria (Ö3 Austria Top 40)	70
Belgium (Ultratip Bubbling Under Flanders)	38
Belgium (Ultratip Bubbling Under Wallonia)	36
France (SNEP)	104
Germany (GfK)	26
Japan Hot 100 (Billboard)	94
Mexico Ingles Airplay (Billboard)	33
Switzerland (Schweizer Hitparade)	55
UK Singles (Official Charts Company)	96
US Bubbling Under Hot 100 Singles (Billboard)	9
US Rock Songs (Billboard)	20
US Alternative Songs (Billboard)	27

Chart (2026)	Peak position
Lithuania (AGATA)	62
Sweden Heatseeker (Sverigetopplistan)	9

== Certifications ==
Region	Certification	Certified units/sales
Germany (BVMI)	Gold	300,000^{‡}
New Zealand (RMNZ)	Platinum	30,000^{‡}
United Kingdom (BPI)	Gold	400,000^{‡}
^{‡} Sales+streaming figures based on certification alone.

== Release history ==
Region	Date	Format
United States	14 February 2012	Digital download
United Kingdom	9 March 2012	Digital EP
