= Ricky Blaze =

Background information
- Also known as: Ricky Blaze
- Born: Ricardo Lloyd Johnson Jr. August 3, 1988 (age 38); Brooklyn, New York, New York, US
- Genres: Dancehall; hip-hop; R&B; electronic; pop
- Occupations: Record producer; singer; songwriter
- Years active: 2008–present
- Labels: FME; Island
- Website: mynameisrickyblaze.com fmerecordings.com

Ricardo Lloyd Johnson Jr. (born August 3, 1988), known professionally as Ricky Blaze, is an American DJ, producer, singer, and songwriter. He has done production work in the dancehall music space and the trancehall subgenre. He has produced and collaborated with Shaggy and Sean Paul, and has also worked with Vybz Kartel, Jim Jones, Maino, Kardinal Offishall, Jasmine Sullivan, Nicki Minaj, and Santigold.

== Early life ==
Johnson was born in the East Flatbush section of New York City's, Borough of Brooklyn to Jamaican parents. He attended Humanities Preparatory Academy in New York City. His introduction to music came at the age of 10 when he grew fascinated with the discipline of DJing after watching a neighbor who held the profession of a DJ. This eventually lead to opportunities for Ricky to provide support and assistance to the neighborhood DJs by keeping the party going when they needed to step away, ultimately leading him to become a full-on DJ and promoter/organizer of parties and events by the age of 15.

While DJing, Ricky's interest in music production and songwriting began to develop, pushing him to develop his skills in this area. At the age of 17, Ricky officially made the transition from DJing to music production, singing, and songwriting.

He credits Reggae and R&B pioneers Dennis Brown, Peter Tosh, and Gloria Gaynor for his early musical influence.

== Music career ==
=== 2006-2010 ===
Ricky achieved debut success as a music producer following his collaboration with Dancehall artist Ding Dong on the song "Bad Man Forward, Bad Man Pull Up".

In 2008, Ricky Blaze began work on his solo debut project which would produce the single "Cut Dem Off". It would be on-air New York radio DJ personality and Hip Hop pioneer, Mister Cee, that would be the first to play the single, ultimately leading to the song's success and Ricky's status as a capable songwriter and producer and creator of the Trancehall genre.

In 2009 Ricky worked with Chelley, producing and co-writing the dance-pop song "Took the Night". During this year Ricky would also find success with Major Lazer on their album release Guns Don't Kill People... Lazers Do, co-producing, writing, and vocalizing on the song "Keep It Goin’ Louder" featuring twin sister Billboard R&B duo, Nina Sky.

In 2010, Ricky Blaze collaborated with dancehall artist Gyptian to create "Hold You." This release achieved certified gold status by RIAA. During this year he also worked with R&B songstress Jazmine Sullivan, contributing to the “Luv Back” song off of her 2010 full-length studio project, Love Me Back.

=== 2011-Present ===
In 2011, Ricky Blaze released a six-song EP, My Name is Ricky Blaze. “Just You And I,” served as the project's lead single release. The project also included songs featuring Harlem rapper, producer, and Dipset founder, Jim Jones, and Toronto rapper and producer, Kardinal Offishall.

In 2012, Ricky worked with the Atlantic Records recording artist Santigold. The collaboration produced a song titled, “Disparate Youth” and would serve as the lead single off of Santigold's 2012 album, Master of My Make-Believe. The song would peak at #9 on Billboard's Bubbling Under Hot 100 singles chart.

In 2013, Ricky worked with Vybz Kartel to produce “Touch Ah Button;” a song off of the Kartel's 2013 release, Kartel Forever: Trilogy. This year he would also release The Maestro, a 15-track LP that featured New York rappers Jim Jones, Maino, and Talib Kweli. Additionally this year, he would be featured on Jim Jones’ “We Got It” off of the EP We Own the Night and also contribute to Grammy Award winning Dancehall artist Sean Paul’s full length album, Full Frequency, on the song "It’s Your Life".

In 2015 he would earn production credits on Kranium’s full length project, Rumors.

In January 2016, under his label/production company, FME Recordings, Ricky released a compilation album, Conquer The Moment. The release provided 12 tracks that were rich with the Dancehall and Reggae sound and included features with Grammy Award winning reggae artist - Shaggy, Kranium, Gyptian, Black Ryno, Tifa, Mr. Easy, and a host of others. The lead single off the project, "Apart", featuring R&B/soul newcomer and FME artist, Alexus Rose, gained popularity in London and France leading to a recording contract with historic Reggae record label, Island Records.

The FME artist roster currently consists of Ricky Blaze, Chelley, Alexus Rose, Ding Dong, Kranium, Mr. Easy, and Cecile.

Ricky Blaze is currently at work on Conquer the Moment 2. The lead single off of the upcoming project is "Like This", and features Sean Paul. The song has been mentioned by music media outlets Mass Appeal and Audiomack.

Over the years, The Fader magazine has covered Ricky Blaze's career in several editorials.

== Discography ==
=== Studio albums ===
Year	Title
2010	My Name is Ricky Blaze - EP
2013	The Maestro
2016	Conquer the Moment
2018	X-Rated

=== Single release collaborations ===
Year	Artist	Title	Peak chart positions										Certifications	Album
Year	Artist	Title	AUT	BEL (FL)	BEL (WA)	CAN	FRA	JPN	UK	US	US Alt.	US R&B	Certifications	Album
2010	Gyptian	"Hold You"	—	31	—	69	45	—	16	77	—	31	US: Gold; UK: Gold	Hold You
2012	Santigold	"Disparate Youth"	70	38	36	—	104	94	96	109	27	—	—	Master of My Make-Believe

=== Full length album collaborations ===
Year	Artist	Album	Peak chart positions		
Year	Artist	Album	US Billboard 200	US Top Electronic Albums	US Top Heatseekers
2009	Major Lazer	Guns Don't Kill People... Lazers Do	169	7	4

=== Extended Plays ===
Year	Title
2007	Rumors Album
2011	Ricky Blaze Presents The Party Vibe Riddim

=== Singles ===
Year	Title
2010	I Feel Free (Remix)
2012	Call on Me
2012	Crash the Party
2013	She Left
2013	Suh Di Ting Set
2013	Lightaz (Remixes)
2013	Kush Heaven
2013	Last Try
2014	Never Be
2014	Take Ya Money (feat. Chelley)
2014	Endless Summer (feat. Kes The Band)
2014	Ricky Blaze Presents Uptown Julie Riddim
2014	Overrated
2015	Pull It
2016	Look
2016	Apart
2016	Like This
2017	Give It To Me
2018	Slam!
2018	Eraase Them
2018	Tooo Much
2018	This Moment
2019	Explosions
2019	Deh Yah
2019	Nah Play Fair
2019	The Sauce
2020	Swerve
2021	Soft Strokes
