= Pon de Floor =

Single by Major Lazer featuring Vybz Kartel and Afrojack

from the album Guns Don't Kill People... Lazers Do
- Released: August 3, 2009
- Genre: Dancehall; baile funk
- Length: 3:33 (original mix); 3:05 (radio edit) - (with silence ending)
- Label: Mad Decent; Downtown; V2
- Songwriters: Thomas Pentz; David Taylor; Nick van de Wall; Adidja Azim Palmer
- Producers: Major Lazer; Afrojack

Major Lazer singles chronology
"Keep It Going Louder" (2009)	"Pon de Floor" (2009)	"Jump Up" (2010)

Vybz Kartel singles chronology
"Pon de Floor" (2009)	"Know Bout Me" (2010)

Audio sample
- file; help

Music video
- "Pon De Floor" on YouTube

"Pon de Floor" is a song by Major Lazer, a collaborative musical project consisting of the American DJ Diplo and the British DJ Switch. The single was released in 2009 by Mad Decent and Downtown Records as the second single from Major Lazer's first studio album, Guns Don't Kill People... Lazers Do. The duo wrote the song and produced it with Afrojack, with vocals by Vybz Kartel. "Pon de Floor" is a dancehall and baile funk song and was positively received by music critics. It appeared on the charts in the United Kingdom in 2010, where it reached number 125. Eric Wareheim directed the music video for "Pon de Floor", which shows people dry humping, and incorporates daggering choreography. The song has been heavily sampled in Chiddy Bang's "Shooter" and Beyoncé's "Run the World (Girls)".

== Composition ==
"Pon de Floor" was written and produced by Major Lazer – whose members at the time were Diplo and Switch. It features vocals from Vybz Kartel, and Afrojack provided additional production and mixed the song. "Pon de Floor" is a dancehall and baile funk song. The song uses a rapid marching snare drums beat and synth riffs. Its hook is a chopped-up vocal line, and according to Josh Heller of Drowned in Sound Kartel's input is "laughing and occasionally shouting 'Major Lazer!'".

== Reception ==
John Bush of Allmusic lauded the production of "Pon de Floor" and named it a tour de force. NME's Pete Cashmore called the song "shitfacedly loopy", while Andy Freivogel from Dusted Magazine noted it as one of the best tracks from Guns Don't Kill People... Lazers Do. "Pon de Floor" is used during the video game DJ Hero 2. "Pon de Floor" entered the UK Singles Chart of 17 April 2010 at number 187. It later peaked at number 125.

== Music video and live performance ==
The music video for "Pon de Floor" was directed by Eric Wareheim, and shows people daggering against a cartoon background depicting suburbia. It incorporates daggering choreography. Ted Maider from Consequence of Sound wrote "This song is already fucking whacked, but the video takes it to a whole other level ... 'Pon de Floor' seems equally as offensive as watching porn on hallucinogenic substances." Major Lazer performed "Pon de Floor" at the Go! music festival at Marina Bay Sands, Singapore in September 2010.

== Samples and cover versions ==
"Pon de Floor" was sampled in Chiddy Bang's "Shooter", a song on his mini-mixtape, Air Swell (2010). In 2011, Beyoncé released "Run the World (Girls)", which heavily samples "Pon de Floor". "Run the World" was produced by Switch and The-Dream, and co-produced by Knowles and Shea Taylor.

== Track listing ==
- 12-inch single
1. "Pon de Floor" – 3:33
2. "Pon de Floor" (Drop the Lime Remix) – 4:06
3. "Pon de Floor" (Ninjasonik Remix)
4. "Pon de Floor" (Blue Bear Remix) – 4:15
- Digital download – EP 1
1. "Pon de Floor" (radio edit) – 3:05
2. "Pon de Floor" (The Streets Remix) – 3:07
3. "Pon de Floor" (Drop the Lime Remix) – 4:06
4. "Pon de Floor" (Blue Bear Remix) – 4:15
5. "Pon de Floor" (Camo UFOs Jungle Edit) – 4:32
- Digital download – EP 2
1. "Pon de Floor" – 3:33
2. "Pon de Floor" (The Streets Remix) – 3:07
3. "Pon de Floor" (Drop the Lime Remix) – 4:06
4. "Pon de Floor" (Blue Bear Remix) – 4:15
5. "Pon de Floor" (Mike B vs. Nate Day Remix) – 4:32

== Certifications ==
Region	Certification	Certified units/sales
United Kingdom (BPI)	Silver	200,000^{‡}
^{‡} Sales+streaming figures based on certification alone.

== Release history ==
Country	Date	Format	Label
United States	2009	12"	Mad Decent; Downtown; V2
Austria	19 April 2010	Digital EP 1	Mad Decent; Downtown; V2
Belgium	19 April 2010	Digital EP 1	Mad Decent; Downtown; V2
Denmark	19 April 2010	Digital EP 1	Mad Decent; Downtown; V2
Finland	19 April 2010	Digital EP 1	Mad Decent; Downtown; V2
France	19 April 2010	Digital EP 1	Mad Decent; Downtown; V2
Germany	19 April 2010	Digital EP 1	Mad Decent; Downtown; V2
Ireland	19 April 2010	Digital EP 1	Mad Decent; Downtown; V2
Italy	19 April 2010	Digital EP 1	Mad Decent; Downtown; V2
Netherlands	19 April 2010	Digital EP 1	Mad Decent; Downtown; V2
Norway	19 April 2010	Digital EP 1	Mad Decent; Downtown; V2
Portugal	19 April 2010	Digital EP 1	Mad Decent; Downtown; V2
Spain	19 April 2010	Digital EP 1	Mad Decent; Downtown; V2
Sweden	19 April 2010	Digital EP 1	Mad Decent; Downtown; V2
United Kingdom	19 April 2010	Digital EP 1	Mad Decent; Downtown; V2
Australia	16 July 2010	Digital EP 2	Downtown
New Zealand	16 July 2010	Digital EP 2	Downtown
