= Run the World (Girls) =

2011 single by Beyoncé

Single by Beyoncé

from the album 4
- Released: April 21, 2011
- Recorded: 2010
- Studio: MSR (New York City)
- Genre: Electropop; R&B; dance
- Length: 3:56
- Label: Columbia
- Songwriters: Beyoncé Knowles; Terius "The-Dream" Nash; David Taylor; Wesley Pentz; Adidja Palmer; Nick van de Wall
- Producers: Switch; The-Dream

Beyoncé singles chronology
"Why Don't You Love Me" (2010)	"Run the World (Girls)" (2011)	"Best Thing I Never Had" (2011)

Music video
- "Run the World (Girls)" on YouTube

"Run the World (Girls)" is a song by American singer Beyoncé from her fourth studio album 4 (2011), released as the lead single from the album on April 21, 2011. An unedited demo of the song, then thought to be titled "Girls (Who Run the World)", was leaked on the internet on April 18, 2011. "Run the World" premiered on US radio on April 21, 2011, and was digitally released the same day.

"Run the World" is an electropop and R&B song that heavily samples "Pon de Floor" by Major Lazer. In an interview with Pitchfork published on February 12, 2012, Santi “Santigold” White asserts that she had previously done some writing for Beyoncé and was the first person to show her the “Pon de Floor” video, which inspired Beyoncé and her producers to sample the song.

The song's title and lyrics comprise an unapologetically aggressive message promoting female empowerment. "Run the World" received mixed reviews by critics; some complimented the song's sample, its musical direction, and Beyoncé's aggressiveness, while others criticized the continuation of past themes and stated that they wanted to see Beyoncé covering new topics. Some critics compared "Run the World" to Beyoncé's other singles with similar themes such as "Independent Women" (2000) – with Destiny's Child, and "Single Ladies (Put a Ring on It)" (2008) among others, wanting to see Beyonce move past these same familiar themes.

In the United States, the song was moderately successful, peaking at number 29 on the US Billboard Hot 100. It fared better in some international markets, reaching the top ten in Australia, Belgium, Israel, Japan, the Netherlands, New Zealand, and Norway. It was also a top 20 hit in Canada, France, Ireland, Italy, and the United Kingdom. The song's accompanying music video was directed by Francis Lawrence and was filmed in California over a three-day span. The video won Best Choreography at the 2011 MTV Video Music Awards and Best Dance Performance at the 2011 Soul Train Music Awards.

Beyoncé promoted the single with live performances at the 2011 Billboard Music Awards and on the French X Factor. Her performance at the Billboard Music Awards ignited controversy surrounding the production due to visual similarities to a performance by Italian entertainer Lorella Cuccarini in February 2010 at the 60th Sanremo Music Festival in Italy. "Run the World" was used to awaken the crew of the final mission of the US Space Shuttle Atlantis and was dedicated to Mission Specialist Sandra Magnus.

== Background and development ==
In an interview with The Capital FM Network in early March 2011, Shea Taylor confirmed that 4's lead single would premiere at the end of April. "Run the World" was written by Terius "The-Dream" Nash, Beyoncé, Nick van de Wall, Thomas Wesley Pentz, Dave Taylor, and Adidja Palmer. It was produced by Switch, The-Dream, and Beyoncé. "Run the World" was recorded by DJ Swivel and Pat Thrall at MSR Studios, New York City, and was mixed by Serban Ghenea at MixStar Studios, Virginia Beach. Before release, the song's title was rumored to be "Girls (Who Run the World)". On April 14, 2011, two portions of the song leaked online while an unfinished demo of "Run the World (Girls)" was leaked online on April 18, 2011. In an interview with Billboard, Beyoncé described the song:

It's definitely riskier than something a bit more... simple. I just heard the track and loved that it was so different: it felt a bit African, a bit electronic and futuristic. It reminded me of what I love, which is mixing different cultures and eras — things that typically don't go together — to create a new sound. I can never be safe; I always try and go against the grain. As soon as I accomplish one thing, I just set a higher goal. That's how I've gotten to where I am.

Between June 16 and 27, 2011, one song from 4 each day was available to listen to on Beyoncé's official website, together with its accompanying photographs from the album packaging and a quote. On June 27, 2011, "Run the World (Girls)" was the twelfth song to be made available. In the accompanying quote, Beyoncé said: "I try to write songs that will bring out the best in all of us and keep us close together. I think about saying the things that women want to say but sometimes are not confident enough to say. I am going to continue to write those songs that give women strength."

== Release and artwork ==
After the single leaked on the internet, it was released early. "Run the World (Girls)" premiered on US radio on April 21, 2011, at 8 am. EST, and was made available for download on iTunes Stores worldwide the same day. According to Digital Spy, the single was available on iTunes, and podcast service Concrete Loop, without payment a few hours before its official release. "Run the World (Girls)" was released to mainstream, urban contemporary and urban adult contemporary radio on April 26, 2011. According to MTV News, "Run the World (Girls)" was well received by Beyoncé's fans on Twitter. A Digital EP with three remixes of the song was released in Australia, New Zealand, Europe, and the UK, on September 2, 2011.

The cover art for "Run the World (Girls)" was previewed on April 20, 2011. On the cover, Beyoncé strikes a bold pose while standing in sand. With her fist in the air covered in forearm protectors, Beyoncé wears a hip cut draping yellow Emilio Pucci dress and black stiletto boots. The Los Angeles Times wrote that the photograph points to a "...post-apocalyptic war zone, donning an elaborate gold headdress and holding a red flag emblazoned with a black 'B'." The photograph was taken on April 14, 2011. Tray Hova of Vibe magazine complimented the cover art of the single, stating that Beyoncé looks "resplendent as hell" on the cover and that "Nobody's complaining about Bey season here." Eleanor Young, in Marie Claire, described the cover art as "hideous". Ray Rogers of Billboard stated that Beyoncé "clearly transmits her trademark message of female empowerment".

== Composition ==
"Run the World (Girls)"
"Run the World" uses a militaristic beat sampled from "Pon de Floor" by Major Lazer and has lyrics that speak of female empowerment.

"Run the World" is an electropop and R&B song. Jocelyn Vena of MTV News described the song as a "club banger" and "female empowerment/girl power type of song", like several of Beyoncé's previous singles, including "Independent Women" (2000)—with Destiny's Child—and "Single Ladies (Put a Ring on It)" (2008), both being feminist anthems. Shea Taylor said that the track draws more from pop music than R&B, and is reminiscent of Michael Jackson's prime work. "Run the World (Girls)" also incorporates dancehall influences in the tradition of "Get Me Bodied" (2007). The "high energy" song contains elements of go-go, and is set to a marching militaristic drumbeat sampled from the club song "Pon de Floor" by Major Lazer and Vybz Kartel. "Run the World" also consists of heavy synth pangs and African and marching percussion.

A review in The Huffington Post, and Kevin O'Donnell of Spin magazine, noted that "Run the World (Girls)" features shout vocals and raw chanting. In an interview with Ray Rogers of Billboard, Beyoncé stated that this was something she wanted to showcase in 4, "I used a lot of the brassiness and grittiness in my voice that people hear in my live performances, but not necessarily on my records." Kathy McCabe of Australian newspaper The Daily Telegraph likened "Run the World" to "Single Ladies" and "Diva" (2009). Johnston Breihan of The Village Voice compared "Run the World (Girls)" to schoolyard chants, due to its "cheer-team beats" and the repetitive use of the word "Girls". Billboard magazine's critic Jem Aswad described the song's production, lyrics and Beyoncé's vocals:

"Run the World (Girls)" is a complex but catchy track that's actually more reminiscent of M.I.A. and Santigold than Sasha Fierce. The song combines a dancefloor-defying military drumbeat, a sample from Switch's group Major Lazer, an unconventional song structure and some incongruously pretty, layered melodics that are basically chanted but still employ [Knowles'] full vocal range. The lyrics, however, are just as female-empowering as we've come to expect. There's much more to the song than first meets the ear—it confuses on first listen but coalesces beautifully with repeated plays.

Rap-Up stated that Beyoncé is dominant over men in "Run the World". "Run the World" opens with a short piano solo and a heavy beat. Beyoncé chants, "Girls! / We run this mutha / Girls! / Who run the world." It moves into smoother, more persuasive but still boastful lyrics, "I think I need a barber/ None of these niggas can fade me/ I'm so good with this/ I remind you I'm so 'hood with this." She then delivers the repetitive hook and chorus lines. In the second verse, Beyoncé sings that education gives women strength and independence. Other lyrics of this theme include the line, "smart enough to make these millions, strong enough to bear the children, then get back to business." Jocelyn Vena of MTV News said that Beyoncé sings in her signature staccato style on the second verse of the song. She repeats the chorus after the bridge lines and her vocals fade out as the song finishes.

== Critical reception ==
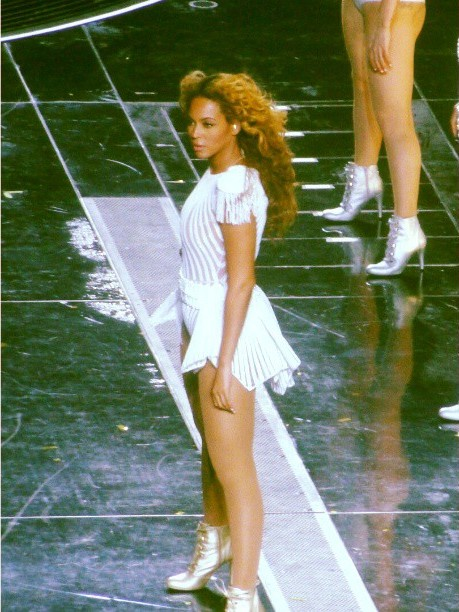
Beyoncé performing "Run the World (Girls)" during The Mrs. Carter Show World Tour in April 2013

Critics had mixed reactions towards the track. Amos Barshad writing for the New York magazine described "Run the World (Girls)" as "kind of a monster — aggressive and intense and totally committed". He also called the song declarative and felt that as a lead single, it was "bluntly effective." Matt Donnelly of The Los Angeles Times compared "Run the World (Girls)" to several of Beyoncé's previous singles, stating that the song has a harder edge than "Independent Women Pt. 1", nevertheless, it does not contain "the gritty, futuristic chic" of "Diva" (2009). Jenna Clarke of The Sydney Morning Herald called it an "infectious sounding track" having a catchy dance beat with empowering lyrics and added that the song showcases "a grittier sounding Beyoncé", yet still following the "power footsteps" of her other chart topping hits such as "Single Ladies" and "Crazy In Love" (2003). Kevin O'Donnell of Spin magazine described the song as "a rousing girl power anthem", which resembles "Single Ladies" and "If I Were a Boy" (2008), and highlighted that "Run The World (Girls)" is "far rowdier" than any of those songs because of its synth squiggles and raw chanting. Jarett Wieselman of the New York Post considered "Run the World (Girls)" to be one of the most exciting tracks Beyoncé has ever released.

Jocelyn Vena of MTV News called "Run the World (Girls)" a "sassy [song with] girl-power lyrics paired with [a] club appeal", further writing that the song is "loud and proud in its relentless message", and that Beyoncé "is clearly rallying the troops to her side". Nick Minichind of VH1 lauded the song for several pointed comments on empowerment which according to him, "are skillfully weaved into the lyrics, without feeling out of place." He also wrote that "Run the World (Girls)" restores girls' own subjectivity and that the bridge shows a "practically Cleopatra-channeling Beyoncé." Lewis Corner from Digital Spy described "Run the World (Girls)" as "yet another female-empowerment revolution that is sure to dominate dancefloors this summer". Robert Copsey, also writing for Digital Spy, awarded the song four stars out of five, complimenting the "earthy beats, hypnotising hooks and militant drums pound[ing] relentlessly as Queen B declares it's 'GRLZ who run this mutha' with more woman-friendly conviction than Geri Halliwell at a Spice Girls convention circa 1998." Tom Breihan of Pitchfork Media wrote that "Run the World (Girls)" is "as devotedly pro-female as the title would lead you to expect", and is as dancefloor-directed as Beyoncé gets, in the tradition of "Get Me Bodied" and "Single Ladies". Slant Magazine's Sal Cinquemani wrote "[Beyoncé] misses the mark big time here" and called the song "plain daft". He, however, praised the song's bridge and Beyoncé "warm, gooey harmonies". Maura Johnston of The Village Voice disapproved of the song's lack of structure, calling it "a bit overstuffed, but fairly enjoyable". Dallas Observer critic Shahryar Rizvi stated that the track "cribs a bit" from Major Lazer's "Pon de Floor" and M.I.A.'s track "Boyz", but added that Beyoncé being a couple of years late in acquiring this sound was "a problem".

In a negative appraisal, Tom Hull cited the song's "punk rigidity" as the worst of 4's "overkill production", while saying, "girls are ever going to run the world sounding like the Sweet."

=== Rankings ===
Digital Spy ranked "Run the World" at number 16 on its list of 25 Best Songs of 2011. Jon Pareles of The New York Times placed the song in his list of Top Songs from 2011. It received a Teen Choice Award for Choice R&B/Hip-Hop Track at the 2011 Teen Choice Awards. "Run the World" was nominated for Best Single at the 2011 Virgin Media Music Awards. On The Village Voice's 2011 year-end Pazz & Jop singles list, "Run the World (Girls)" was ranked at number 137. The song was nominated for Best R&B/Urban Dance Track at the 27th Annual International Dance Music Awards. In 2013, John Boone and Jennifer Cady of E! Online placed the song at number seven on their list of ten best Beyoncé's songs, writing that it "had everyone, male and female, dancing". The same year, the writers of Complex magazine put the song at number 25 on their list of Beyoncé's 25 best songs, adding that her assertion "we run this mother", "practically wills every woman who hears this song to aspire to bigger things".

== Chart performance ==
Three days after its release to digital download outlets, the single debuted on the UK Singles Chart at number 18 on April 24, 2011. A week later it had risen to number 11 and debuted at number five on the UK R&B chart. The song descended the chart for five consecutive weeks to number 45 before rising again to number 23 on the singles chart and from number 12 to number 6 on the R&B chart on May 29, 2011, when the music video was released. In Ireland, the single debuted at number 11 on April 28, 2011, the highest chart entry that week and in France, "Run the World (Girls)" debuted at number 33 with 2,065 copies sold. It peaked at number 12. On May 1, 2011, the song entered the Australian Singles Chart at number 12, being the highest new entry that week, and at number six on its urban chart. One day later, "Run the World (Girls)" debuted at number 21 in New Zealand, where it was the highest new entry that week. "Run the World (Girls)" declined in the charts in Australia and New Zealand. However, after the release of its music video, the single rose from number 42 to number 15 on the ARIA Singles Chart and peaked at number 4 on its urban chart on May 30, 2011. The following week, it climbed to number 10 on the singles chart, where it peaked. It was certified 5× platinum by the Australian Recording Industry Association (ARIA) for sales of over 350,000 copies. The video release helped "Run the World (Girls)" re-enter the New Zealand Singles Chart at number 26 on May 23, 2011 and it peaked the following week at number nine. "Run the World (Girls)" was certified gold by the Recording Industry Association of New Zealand (RIANZ) for sales of over 7,500 copies.

"Run the World (Girls)" debuted at number 40 on Canadian Hot 100 chart issue dated May 7, 2011. Paul Tuch of Nielsen SoundScan called the debut impressive as the song was released between digital and radio charts. It stands as Beyoncé's highest entry as a solo artist on the chart. After declining in the chart for three consecutive weeks, "Run the World (Girls)" left the chart in the week ending May 28, 2011. For the week ending June 11, 2011, the single recovered from number 60 to number 16 on the Canadian Hot 100 chart, receiving the titles of the greatest chart mover and the greatest digital gainer. For the issue dated May 7, 2011, "Run the World (Girls)" debuted at number 23 on the US Hot Digital Songs chart, selling 77,000 downloads sold. and at number 65 on the Radio Songs chart with 18 million listener impressions. It accordingly debuted at position 33 on the US Billboard Hot 100 chart, and was the highest debut on the US Hot R&B/Hip-Hop Songs chart, opening at number 41. Digital sales of the single declined by 39%, amassing a total of a total of 47,000 downloads; it fell to number 39 on the Hot Digital Songs chart.

"Run the World (Girls)" was the highest debut, starting at number 37 on the US Pop Songs chart issue dated May 21, 2011. For the same week ending, the song continued to descend the Hot 100 chart to number 65. One week later, the single debuted at number 43 on the US Hot Dance Club Songs chart, becoming Beyoncé's nineteenth solo entry on that chart. The same week, the single fell to number 76 on the Hot 100 chart. After descending the Hot 100 chart for four consecutive weeks, "Run the World (Girls)" recovered 26 places, moving from number 76 to number 50 for the week ending June 4, 2011, promoted by the song's re-entry on the Hot Digital Songs chart at number 44 after its music video's release. The following week, the single escalated to number 29 on the Hot 100 chart, which was its peak, as it descended the Hot 100 chart in subsequent weeks. "Run the World (Girls)" peaked at number one on the Hot Dance Club Songs chart issue dated July 9, 2011. On August 8, 2022, it was certified 4× platinum by the Recording Industry Association of America (RIAA) for sales and streams of over 4,000,000 units.

== Music video ==
=== Background and release ===
The environment, I have to give her and Francis that credit. She really challenged Francis on finding a world that's unique to her. We could have easily done it in downtown L.A. We could have easily done it in downtown New York, but it was really important to her to find a world that was unique to her look and image to her new project
—Frank Gatson Jr to MTV News about the choice of the video's location.

The music video for "Run the World (Girls)" was directed by Francis Lawrence. Beyoncé worked with eight choreographers, including Frank Gatson and Sheryl Murakami. The Mozambican dance group Tofo Tofo was also a major source of inspiration for the video's choreography; after having seen their videos on YouTube but struggling to adopt the group's unique dancing style on her own, Beyoncé invited Tofo Tofo to LA, where they taught her their style and were featured in the music video themselves as well. The executive producer was Missy Galanida. Filming took place in the Mojave Desert and Inglewood, California. Images from the Mojave shoot were leaked online on April 12, 2011, showing Beyoncé standing in a smoky, post-apocalyptic war zone, wearing a gladiator outfit and a gold crown, and waving a red flag with a "B" logo. She was surrounded by dancers in brightly colored skirts, black military-style jackets and peaked caps. Other images showed an army of women posing against a ravaged car with the word "Révolution" sprayed on it. Posters of Beyoncé's face are seen behind the women. In an interview with MTV News on April 18, 2011, director Francis Lawrence, who had previously directed the video for Lady Gaga's "Bad Romance" (2009), discussed the music video:

"I just shot a Beyoncé video at the beginning of this last week, Monday, Tuesday, Wednesday, which was fun, and I hadn't done a video since 2009. It'll be big, it'll probably be one of the bigger Beyoncé music videos ever done. And, I can say that I think the song is unbelievable. The Gaga thing took me by surprise, 'cause I've done videos for probably 15 years, and I had forgotten what it felt like to have a video premiere and have it be anticipated and have it explode. And yeah I hope the same for Beyoncé, but I don't know if that's gonna happen. It is a fantastic song, so I really hope that song catches for her, and I think the video's gonna be really fun and cool and different for her."

On May 4, 2011, another 20-second clip of the music video was released, showing a troupe of females in a rural location, however Beyoncé is not seen during the clip. A third teaser was released on May 10, 2011, showing Beyoncé standing in front of a burning car, riding a horse and assembling an army in a post-apocalyptic clip. At a private listening party held on May 12, 2011, for 4, Beyoncé offered a small group of fans a preview of five songs from the album and the official video for "Run the World (Girls)", which reportedly features a lion and Beyoncé writhing around in sand. The video was scheduled for release on May 13, 2011, at 12:01 a.m, however Vevo confirmed that the release would be delayed because Beyoncé was "...perfecting it". The video premiered on American Idol on May 18, 2011. The director's cut of the music video is included on the deluxe version of 4. The video was released on July 1, 2011, but was leaked on June 29, 2011.

=== Fashion ===
In the video for "Run the World (Girls)", Beyoncé's outfits include armor, a high priestess' headdress, lingerie and runway couture Beyoncé is first seen wearing a red and gold embroidered dress with thigh-high boots, both by Alexander McQueen from fall/winter 2010. In the first dance scene of the video, she is wearing a Brian Lichtenberg patchwork fur vest. For a dance routine in sand, she wears a black fringed Norma Kamali outfit, followed by a Givenchy dress in a scene depicting Beyoncé with two larger-than-life hyenas. During a scene involving warriors, Beyoncé is wearing a black cut-out dress shown at Jean Paul Gaultier's spring couture show. A short Gareth Pugh dress with golden sequins and two gowns by Emilio Pucci – one yellow with a plunging neckline, the other emerald green with an asymmetrical cut – complete Beyoncé's outfits.

=== Synopsis ===
The video begins with Beyoncé riding a black horse over an open, deserted plain. As the horse lifts off the ground, scenes of Beyoncé standing atop a ruined vehicle are shown, as she leads a large army of women. Additional scenery includes a large bull in the middle of the battleground and a large banner featuring an African themed drawing of Beyoncé. A woman seemingly nailed on a cross is later seen. As several scantily clad women are shown, a SWAT team of men charge towards the battlefield as a sample from Major Lazer's "Pon de Floor" is played. As the male forces arrive, Beyoncé, is wearing a large golden helm and is surrounded by a lion, a large group of women prepared for battle and banners featuring Beyoncé insignia. As the song begins, Beyoncé removes her armor and confronts the male army, engaging in a series of shoulder-thrusting dance routines.

Beyoncé dances seductively towards the men as scenes of Beyoncé wearing several outfits are seen, the first of which is a white evening gown as she grasps the chains of two chained hyenas. As the confrontation escalates, Beyoncé appears next to several flaming vehicles, and she undergoes another costume change. Returning to the main plot, the video shows Beyoncé in front of a small group of her female army, wearing a yellow ensemble and black heeled-boots. As the dancing commences, scenes of the two clashing armies are seen while Beyoncé writhes in sand. The females, now an even larger group, are shown dancing, using powerful and emphatic movements, in front of the male army with alternating costumes and several flags in the background. The video ends with the front line of females confronting the men face to face, raising their right arms and saluting to them as Beyoncé rips off the male general's badge, placing it on herself.

=== Reception ===
The video received general acclaim from critics. On the night of the video's premiere, Rap-Up complimented Beyoncé on starting a "dance revolution", her "heavily-choreographed visuals" and "menagerie of wild animals, outrageous fashion, and epic dance sequences". Eric Henderson of Slant Magazine wrote that Beyoncé comes off like "barely sentient" but added that she remains cohesive and rational as a human being in real life. He further wrote: "Her reserve of crazy is far from bottomless, and she seems to save it all for her music videos, and I love her for that [...] [The video is] awesome in distressingly fragmented ways." Gina Serpe of E! Online wrote that "for anyone still laboring under the illusion that Beyoncé does not mean business, well, just watch this video. Described by B[eyoncé] herself as 'futuristic', 'electronic' and 'African', the 29-year-old fused all that and more into a still remarkably cohesive music video." CBS News wrote the "smoking hot video [was] blowing up on the web". The Huffington Post wrote that Beyoncé largely brings back the elements that made "Single Ladies (Put a Ring on It)"'s video a hit, citing women's empowerment and a brand new dance. Jarett Wieselman of the New York Post complimented Beyoncé's wardrobe and dancing in the video, and wrote that the choreography ensures the lyrics, "my persuasion can build a nation".

James Montgomery of MTV News wrote Beyoncé has returned "to claim her throne" and that the message in the video "hammers the point home with all the subtlety of a jackhammer". He highlighted the "elaborate, hip-displacing dance routines, haute-couture costuming, wide-screen cinematography and expensive-looking sets". Larry Fitzmaurice of Pitchfork Media wrote that "a thousand YouTube bedroom dancers flood[ing] the Internet with their own takes" were to come in the near future. Rolling Stone praised Beyoncé's dance moves and wrote that it is the latest addition "to the canon of dance pop videos with over-the-top apocalyptic imagery". Nick Neyland of Prefix Magazine wrote Beyoncé made the best music video of 2011, commending its "big budget extravagance, full of preposterous costumes and ridiculously over the top dance routines". Sarah Anne Hughes of The Washington Post wrote that Beyoncé uses "the non-violent tactic of dance to fight off some bad guys in riot gear" and that Beyoncé's alter ego Sasha Fierce "is out in full force as she uses an army of swiveling and shimmying women, her middle finger and two hyenas on leashes to keep control of a post-apocalyptic society". Billboard magazine wrote that Beyoncé made a triumphant return in the elaborate music video for "Run the World (Girls)" after creating classic clips for "Single Ladies (Put a Ring on It)", "Crazy in Love", and "Ring the Alarm".

=== Accolades ===
On July 20, 2011, the video received three nominations at the 2011 MTV Video Music Awards in the categories Best Female Video, Best Choreography, and Best Cinematography. It won the Best Choreography category. The video was nominated for Best Video at the 2011 MTV Europe Music Awards. On November 27, 2011, the video won Best Dance Performance at the 2011 Soul Train Music Awards. It was nominated for Best Video at the 2011 Virgin Media Music Awards and Favorite Music Video at the 2012 People's Choice Awards. The writers of Slant Magazine put the music video at number 12 on their list of The 25 Best Music Videos of 2011. The Guardian included "Run the World (Girls)" on its list of the best pop videos of 2011, praising its "glorious effect" and the heavy choreography, before concluding that it is "tiring just watching it". On BET's Notarized: Top 100 Videos of 2011, "Run the World (Girls)" was ranked at number two. The video was nominated for Best Pop Video and Best Choreography at the 2012 MTV Video Music Awards Japan, and International Artist Video of the Year at the 2012 MuchMusic Video Awards. It was nominated for World's Best Video at the 2012 World Music Awards. In 2013, John Boone and Jennifer Cady of E! Online placed the video at number seven on their list of Beyoncé's ten best music videos, comparing her dancing in the sand with Shakira's.

== Live performances ==
Beyoncé's first live performance of "Run the World (Girls)" was on May 17, 2011, on Surprise Oprah! A Farewell Spectacular at the United Center in Chicago. The special aired on May 23, 2011. Beyoncé wore a tuxedo leotard with red heels and was accompanied by 40 female back-up dancers. The show was organized to commemorate the 25th and final season of The Oprah Winfrey Show. Celebrities including Madonna, Tom Hanks, John Legend, Dakota Fanning, Tom Cruise and his wife Katie Holmes were present. Beyoncé altered the bridge's lyrics, singing: "Oprah, your persuasion can build a nation." The crowd held up blue lights in the arena as Beyoncé sang the song twice while Winfrey danced. According to the Chicago Tribune, Beyoncé received the loudest applause of the show. Beyoncé performed "Run the World (Girls)" live at the 2011 Billboard Music Awards ceremony at the MGM Grand Garden Arena in Las Vegas on May 22, 2011. The writers of Billboard magazine described the live performance as both "stunning" and "impressive". Erika Ramirez of the same magazine put the performance at number one on her list of "Beyonce's 5 Biggest TV Performances" saying that it "showcased the strength of her reign best". It was also placed in the list of 15 Awesome Billboard Music Award Performances by the writers of the magazine.

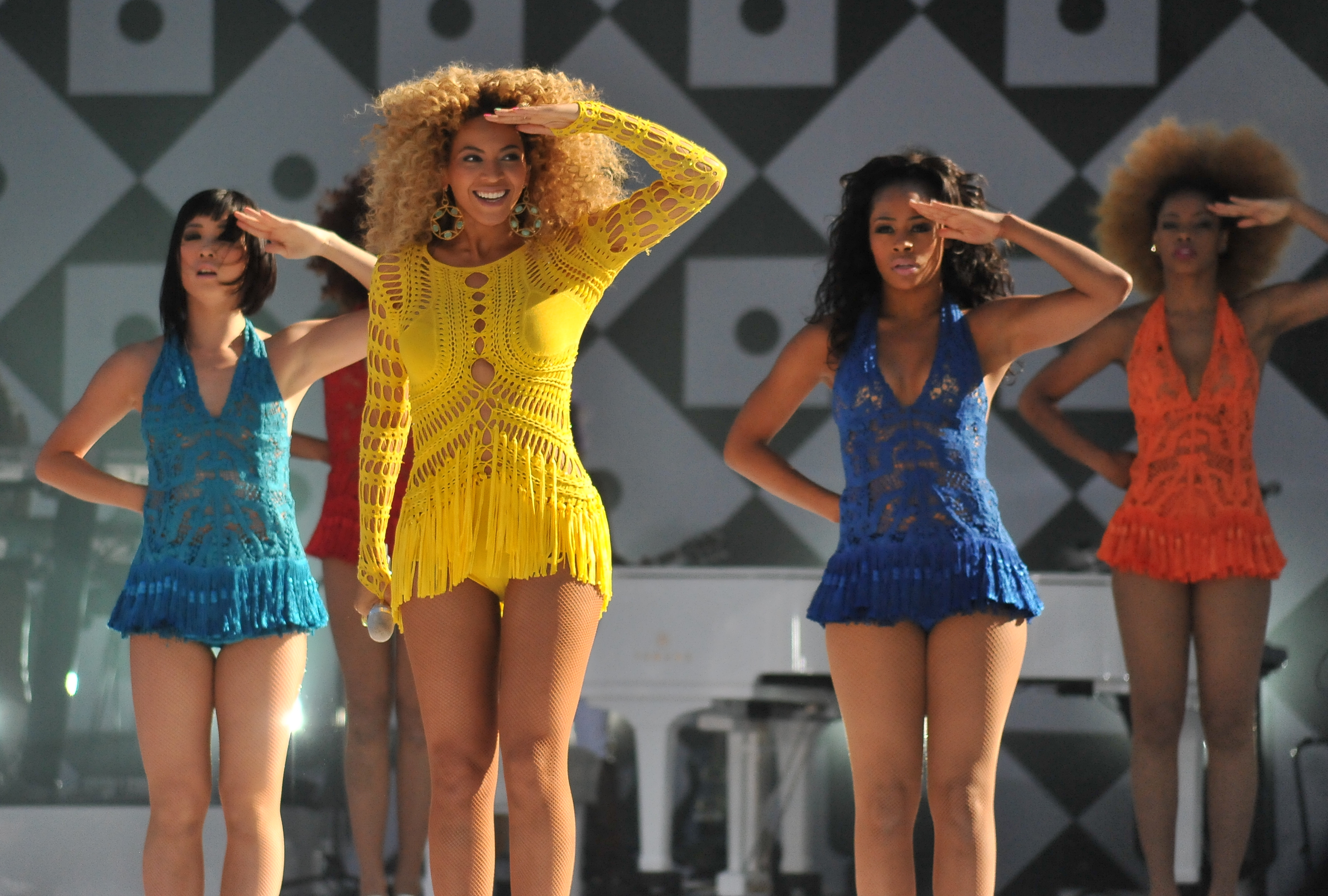
Beyoncé performing "Run the World (Girls)" on Good Morning America

During her promotional tour of Europe, Beyoncé performed at several festivals and made only a limited amount of television appearances. Beyoncé performed the song at a private concert in Nice, France, on June 20, 2011. One week later, Beyoncé flew to the United Kingdom to serve as the closing act at her historic headlining Glastonbury Festival Performance on June 26, 2011, where "Run the World (Girls)" was featured as the second to last song on the 90-minute set list, before finishing with "Halo". Beyoncé then returned to France, where she performed the song along with her live band on Le Grand Journal in June 2011. "Run the World (Girls)" was sung live by Beyoncé on June 28, 2011, on the French X Factor. On July 1, 2011, Beyoncé gave a free concert on Good Morning America as part of its Summer Concert Series on August 14, 2011, and during her 4 Intimate Nights with Beyoncé shows in Roseland Ballroom, New York City, to an audience of 3,500. Beyoncé wore a gold dress and performed with her all-female band and backing singers, called the Mamas. During the ITV special A Night with Beyoncé which aired on December 4 in the United Kingdom, Beyoncé performed "Run the World (Girls)" to a selected crowd of fans.

In May 2012, Beyoncé performed "Run the World" during her Revel Presents: Beyoncé Live revue in Atlantic City, New Jersey, United States' entertainment resort, hotel, casino and spa, Revel. The revue was also called "Back to Business" which was picked from a lyric of the song. A writer of Black Entertainment Television noted, "She dazzled fans with an assortment of high-energy performances of her upbeat hits like... 'Run the World (Girls).'" Caryn Ganz of Spin magazine praised the "swaggy" march, while Rebecca Thomas of MTV News wrote that Beyoncé's choreography during the performance of "Run the World", "is meant to do the same: a series of sensual quickstep moves that revolve around the hips and legs." Ben Ratliff of The New York Times mentioned the song in the "almost continuous high point" of the concert. The song also acted as the opening number of her Mrs. Carter Show World Tour. After a video intro of Beyoncé imitating Mary Antoinette, Beyoncé rises from beneath the stage along with sparks and flames, leading into the opening performance of "Run the World (Girls)". The song was part of the set list of Beyoncé and Jay-Z's co-headlining On the Run Tour (2014). As well as her Formation World Tour (2016) and her OTR II Tour (2018) with Jay-Z again. "Run The World (Girls)" was also part of her Renaissance World Tour (2023) set list.

=== Controversy ===
Following her performance at the Billboard Music Awards, Beyoncé initially received widespread praise from fans, critics and celebrities. However, the following day, critics voiced concerns about similarities to a performance by Italian pop star Lorella Cuccarini in February 2010 at the 60th Sanremo Music Festival. Billy Johnson Jr of Yahoo! Music wrote: "Kenzo Digital, who spent a month creating Beyoncé's interactive video, told Yahoo! News that Lorella concert footage is only part of the inspiration for Beyoncé's show: "[The Cuccarini artists] are awesome and do incredible work as well, but there are a lot of different inspirations for where our piece came from." In a Yahoo! Amplified interview with Daniel Kreps, Digital said: "It's just a bare white screen. It's a technique in video art since the [19]80s in terms of frontal projection and interactive things. That's really nothing new. It's not even a new technology. It's just an incredibly simple, awesome storytelling device, and with a performer like Beyoncé it becomes incredibly powerful." Beyoncé later responded through an interview with AOL Music, saying she was inspired after finding Cuccarini's performance online:

"My makeup artist showed me the performance of Lorella Cuccarini a year ago, and it inspired me so much. I then met with the talented people who worked on it. The technology and concept were so genius. She was inspired after discovering Cuccarini's performance online. Thank God for YouTube or I would have never been exposed to something so inspiring. I never worked so hard on anything in my life as that performance for the Billboard Awards."

== Usage in media and cover versions ==
Beyoncé pre-recorded a message to the astronauts of the final mission of the US Space Shuttle Atlantis on July 16, 2011. With "Run the World (Girls)" playing in the background, Beyoncé said: "Good morning Atlantis. This is Beyoncé. Sandy, Chris, Doug, and Rex, you inspire all of us to dare to live our dreams—to know that we are smart enough and strong enough to achieve this. This song is especially for my girl Sandy and all the women who have taken us to space with them, and the girls who are our future explorers." "Run the World (Girls)" was used in a commercial for Beyoncé's fragrance, Pulse (2011). Released on August 18, 2011, the 15-second advertisement, directed by Jake Nava, shows Beyoncé wearing a metallic gown and walking through lights an instrumental version of the song plays in the background.

A dancer who had worked with Beyoncé, Heather Morris, covered "Run the World (Girls)" for the American television show Glee episode "Asian F", which aired on October 4, 2011. Morris danced to the song wearing a leather cheerleading skirt. Amy Lee of The Huffington Post described Morris' dance choreography as "amazing" and Kristen Dos Santos of E! News called Morris' performance "knockout" and added that it might be Glee's best performance to date. Morris' version debuted at number 91 on the US Billboard Hot 100 chart and at number 47 on the US Hot Digital Songs chart for the week ending October 22, 2011. On August 25, 2013, girl group Adira–Belle performed "Run the World (Girls)" during the fifth season of The X Factor Australia. Giles Hardie of The Sydney Morning Herald rated their performance six out of ten and wrote it was a "terrible song choice". He also felt that it was "a bit early for Beyoncé for these girls perhaps as the song was bigger than them".

"Run the World (Girls)" is featured on the dance rhythm game, Just Dance 2022. The song "Cherry on Top" by Filipino girl group Bini contains the lyric "'Cause you know who run the world," a reference to "Run the World (Girls)".

== Format and track listing ==
- Digital download
1. "Run the World (Girls)" [Single Version] – 3:56
- UK digital remix single
1. "Run the World (Girls)" [Chris Lake Remix] – 6:24
2. "Run the World (Girls)" [Kito Remix] – 3:37
3. "Run the World (Girls)" [Billionaire Remix] – 5:19
- US digital remix single
1. "Run the World (Girls)" [Kaskade Club Remix] – 5:02
2. "Run the World (Girls)" [RedTop Club Remix] – 6:02
3. "Run the World (Girls)" [Jochen Simms Club Remix] – 6:17

== Credits and personnel ==
Credits are taken from 4 liner notes.

- Afrojack – writing
- Diplo – writing
- Jordan "DJ Swivel" Young – recording
- Serban Ghenea – mixing
- John Hanes – mix engineering
- Beyoncé Knowles – vocals, writing, production
- The-Dream – writing, production
- Vybz Kartel – writing
- Phil Seaford – mixing assistance
- Switch – writing, production
- Shea Taylor – co-production
- Pat Thrall – recording
- Pete Wolford – mix engineering assistance

== Charts ==
=== Weekly charts ===
Weekly chart performance for "Run the World (Girls)"
Chart (2011)	Peak position
Australia (ARIA)	10
Australia Urban (ARIA)	4
Belgium (Ultratop 50 Flanders)	14
Belgium Dance (Ultratop Flanders)	4
Belgium (Ultratop 50 Wallonia)	5
Belgium Dance (Ultratop Wallonia)	9
Canada (Canadian Hot 100)	16
Canada CHR/Top 40 (Billboard)	40
CIS Airplay (TopHit)	192
Croatia International Airplay (HRT)	2
Czech Republic (Rádio Top 100)	43
Denmark (Tracklisten)	27
Finland Download (Latauslista)	24
France (SNEP)	12
Germany (Deutsche Black Charts)	2
Global Dance Tracks (Billboard)	11
Ireland (IRMA)	11
Israel (Media Forest)	4
Italy (FIMI)	20
Japan (Japan Hot 100)	6
Netherlands (Dutch Top 40)	25
Netherlands (Single Top 100)	8
New Zealand (Recorded Music NZ)	9
Norway (VG-lista)	9
Poland (Dance Top 50)	43
Portugal Digital Song Sales (Billboard)	5
Romania (Romanian Top 100)	64
Scotland (OCC)	9
Slovakia (Rádio Top 100)	29
South Korea International (Gaon Download Chart)	2
Spain (PROMUSICAE)	21
Switzerland (Schweizer Hitparade)	22
UK Singles (Official Charts)	11
UK R&B (OCC)	5
US Billboard Hot 100	29
US Dance Club Songs (Billboard)	1
US Hot R&B/Hip-Hop Songs (Billboard)	30
US Pop Airplay (Billboard)	37
US Rhythmic (Billboard)	20

=== Year-end charts ===
Year-end chart performance for "Run the World (Girls)"
Chart (2011)	Position
Australia (ARIA)	93
Australia Urban (ARIA)	34
Belgium (Ultratop 50 Flanders)	66
Belgium Dance (Ultratop Flanders)	24
Belgium (Ultratop 50 Wallonia)	64
Croatia International Airplay (HRT)	69
France (SNEP)	73
Japan (Japan Hot 100)	41
Netherlands (Dutch Top 40)	170
Netherlands (Single Top 100)	91
South Korea International (Gaon)	29
UK Singles (OCC)	107
US Dance Club Songs (Billboard)	42
US R&B/Hip-Hop Digital Song Sales (Billboard)	46

== Certifications ==
Certifications and sales for "Run the World (Girls)"
Region	Certification	Certified units/sales
Australia (ARIA)	5× Platinum	350,000^{‡}
Belgium (BRMA)	Gold	15,000^{*}
Brazil (Pro-Música Brasil)	Diamond	250,000^{‡}
Canada (Music Canada)	3× Platinum	240,000^{‡}
Denmark (IFPI Danmark)	Platinum	90,000^{‡}
Germany (BVMI)	Gold	150,000^{‡}
Italy (FIMI)	Gold	25,000^{‡}
New Zealand (RMNZ)	2× Platinum	60,000^{‡}
Portugal (AFP)	Gold	10,000^{‡}
Spain (Promusicae)	Gold	30,000^{‡}
Sweden (GLF)	Platinum	40,000^{‡}
United Kingdom (BPI)	2× Platinum	1,200,000^{‡}
United States (RIAA)	5× Platinum	5,000,000^{‡}
^{*} Sales figures based on certification alone.^{‡} Sales+streaming figures based on certification alone.

== Release history ==
Release dates for "Run the World (Girls)"
Region	Date	Format(s)	Label(s)	Ref.
Australia	April 21, 2011	Contemporary hit radio	Sony Music	
Italy	April 21, 2011	Radio airplay	Sony Music	
Various	April 21, 2011	Digital download	Columbia; Parkwood	
United States	April 26, 2011	Contemporary hit radio; urban adult contemporary; urban contemporary	Columbia; Parkwood	
Australia	September 2, 2011	Digital download (EP)	Sony Music	
New Zealand	September 2, 2011	Digital download (EP)	Sony Music	
United Kingdom	September 2, 2011	Digital download (EP)	RCA	
United States	April 2, 2013	Digital download (EP)	Columbia; Parkwood	

== See also ==
- List of number-one dance singles of 2011 (U.S.)
