= Lazers Never Die =

EP by Major Lazer
- Released: July 20, 2010
- Genre: Electronic
- Length: 23:01
- Label: Downtown
- Producer: Diplo; Switch

Major Lazer chronology
Guns Don't Kill People... Lazers Do (2009)	Lazers Never Die (2010)	Free the Universe (2013)

Lazers Never Die is the first extended play (EP) by Major Lazer, released on July 20, 2010 by Downtown Records. It includes the brand-new song "Sound of Siren" (featuring M.I.A. and Busy Signal), and four remixes of songs from the album Guns Don't Kill People... Lazers Do.

== Track listing ==
No.	Title	Length
1.	"Sound of Siren" (featuring M.I.A. and Busy Signal)	3:50
2.	"Good Enuff" ("Cash Flow" Dub) (featuring Collie Buddz and Lindi Ortega)	2:50
3.	"Bruk Out" (Buraka Som Sistema Mix)	6:20
4.	"Can't Stop Now" (Kicks Like a Mule Remix) (featuring Mr. Vegas, Jovi Rockwell and Azealia Banks)	5:15
5.	"Jump Up" (Thom Yorke Remix)	4:46
Total length:		21:81
