= Free the Universe =

Studio album by Major Lazer
- Released: April 16, 2013
- Recorded: 2012
- Genres: EDM; dancehall; post-dubstep; bounce; moombahton
- Length: 57:05
- Labels: Secretly Canadian; Warner

Major Lazer chronology
| Lazers Never Die (2010) | Free the Universe (2013) | Apocalypse Soon EP (2014) |

Singles from Free the Universe
- 1. "Get Free" Released: April 15, 2012; 2. "Jah No Partial" Released: October 22, 2012; 3. "Watch Out for This (Bumaye)" Released: February 28, 2013; 4. "Bubble Butt" Released: May 24, 2013; 5. "Scare Me" Released: August 19, 2013; 6. "Jessica" Released: September 4, 2013; 7. "Jet Blue Jet" Released: October 29, 2013; 8. "Sweat" Released: November 26, 2013

Free the Universe is the second studio album released by Major Lazer. The album was released on April 16, 2013, and features appearances by Vampire Weekend's Ezra Koenig, Dirty Projectors' Amber Coffman, Santigold, Peaches, Tyga, Flux Pavilion, Bruno Mars, Wyclef Jean, Shaggy, and more. The album peaked at No. 34 in both the Billboard 200 and the UK Albums Chart. It is a follow-up to their 2009 debut Guns Don't Kill People... Lazers Do (2009)

Free the Universe
Aggregate scores
| Source | Rating |
|---|---|
| Metacritic | 68/100 |
Review scores
| Source | Rating |
| AllMusic | 4/5 stars |
| The Guardian | 4/5 stars |
| NME | 7/10 |
| Pitchfork Media | 5.7/10 |
| Rolling Stone | 3.5/5 stars |
| Spin | 7/10 |
| Alternative Press | 3/5 stars |
| Drowned In Sound | 6/10 |

== Track listing ==
| No. | Title | Writer(s) | Producer(s) | Length |
|---|---|---|---|---|
| 1. | "You're No Good" (featuring Santigold, Vybz Kartel, Danielle Haim and Yasmin) | Thomas Pentz; David Taylor; Santi White; Adidja Palmer; Yasmin Shahmir; Ariel Rechtshaid | Major Lazer; Rechtshaid | 4:04 |
| 2. | "Jet Blue Jet" (featuring Leftside, GTA, Zia Benjamin, Razz and Biggy) | Pentz; Craig Parks; Julio "JWLZ/GTA" Mejia | Major Lazer; GTA | 3:19 |
| 3. | "Get Free" (featuring Amber of Dirty Projectors) | Pentz; Taylor; Amber Coffman; David Longstreth | Major Lazer | 4:51 |
| 4. | "Jah No Partial" (featuring Flux Pavilion) | Pentz; Joshua Steele; Errol Osbourne; Lloyd James | Major Lazer; Flux Pavilion; Schlachthofbronx^{[a]} | 4:13 |
| 5. | "Wind Up" (featuring Elephant Man and Opal) | Pentz; O'Neil Bryan; Opal Josephs | Major Lazer; Gianni Marino^{[a]}; Mahesa Utara^{[a]} | 4:27 |
| 6. | "Scare Me" (featuring Peaches and Timberlee) | Pentz; Taylor; Peaches; Timberlee | Major Lazer | 3:00 |
| 7. | "Jessica" (featuring Ezra Koenig of Vampire Weekend) | Pentz; Koenig; Carl Dawkins | Major Lazer | 4:13 |
| 8. | "Watch Out for This (Bumaye)" (featuring Busy Signal, The Flexican and FS Green) | Pentz; Thomás Goethals; Reanno Gordon; Ruben Blades | Major Lazer; The Flexican; FS Green | 4:29 |
| 9. | "Keep Cool" (featuring Shaggy and Wynter Gordon) | Pentz; Orville Burrell; Diana Gordon | Major Lazer; Raf Riley^{[a]} | 4:22 |
| 10. | "Sweat" (featuring Laidback Luke and Ms. Dynamite) | Pentz; Lucas van Scheppingen; Niomi Daley | Major Lazer; Laidback Luke | 4:29 |
| 11. | "Reach for the Stars" (featuring Wyclef Jean) | Pentz; Taylor; Jean; Wayne Henry; Andrew Bain | Major Lazer | 4:06 |
| 12. | "Bubble Butt" (featuring Bruno Mars, Tyga and Mystic) | Pentz; Taylor; Mars; Michael Stevenson; Mystic | Major Lazer; Valentino Khan | 3:47 |
| 13. | "Mashup the Dance" (featuring The Partysquad and Ward 21) | Pentz; Andre Grey; Kunley McCarthy | Major Lazer; The Partysquad; Willy Joy^{[a]} | 3:49 |
| 14. | "Playground" (featuring Bugle and Arama) | Pentz; Taylor; Roy Thompson; Arama Brown | Major Lazer | 3:56 |
| Total length: | | | | 57:05 |

iTunes extended version
| No. | Title | Length |
|---|---|---|
| 15. | "Jah No Partial" (Skream Remix; featuring Flux Pavilion) | 5:45 |
| 16. | "Jah No Partial" (Heroes x Villains Remix; featuring Flux Pavilion) | 4:39 |
| 17. | "Get Free" (What So Not Remix; featuring Amber of Dirty Projectors) | 4:58 |
| 18. | "Bubble Butt" (radio mix; featuring Bruno Mars, 2 Chainz, Tyga and Mystic) | 3:27 |
| Total length: | | 1:15:54 |

Collector's edition: Lazer Strikes Back
| No. | Title | Length |
|---|---|---|
| 15. | "Jah No Partial" (Jack Beats remix; featuring Flux Pavilion) | 4:52 |
| 16. | "Get Free" (Yellow Claw Get Free Money remix; featuring Amber of Dirty Projectors) | 4:16 |
| 17. | "Look At Where We Are" (performed by Hot Chip; Major Lazer extended remix) | 6:25 |
| 18. | "Jah No Partial" (The Reef remix; featuring Flux Pavilion) | 4:50 |
| 19. | "Get Free" (Blood Diamonds remix; featuring Amber of Dirty Projectors) | 4:49 |
| 20. | "Jah No Partial" (Vato Gonzalez remix; featuring Flux Pavilion) | 6:05 |
| 21. | "Talk 'Bout Me" (performed by Popcaan, Major Lazer and Baauer) | 3:32 |
| 22. | "Get Free" (Avicii edit; featuring Amber of Dirty Projectors) | 3:13 |
| 24. | "Settle Down" (performed by No Doubt; Major Lazer remix) | 4:55 |
| 25. | "Get Free" (Camo UFOs remix; featuring Amber of Dirty Projectors) | 4:32 |
| Total length: | | 1:44:34 |

Notes

- ^{^[a]} signifies an additional producer.
- "Wind Up" features additional vocals by Chippy Nonstop.
- "Reach for the Stars" features additional vocals by Jarina De Marco.

== Chart positions ==
=== Weekly charts ===
| Chart (2013–14) | Peak position |
|---|---|
| Australian Albums (ARIA) | 5 |
| Australian Dance Albums (ARIA) | 1 |
| Austrian Albums (Ö3 Austria) | 53 |
| Belgian Albums (Ultratop Flanders) | 9 |
| Belgian Albums (Ultratop Wallonia) | 43 |
| Danish Albums (Hitlisten) | 18 |
| Dutch Albums (Album Top 100) | 17 |
| French Albums (SNEP) | 34 |
| German Albums (Offizielle Top 100) | 88 |
| Japanese Albums (Oricon) | 172 |
| New Zealand Albums (RMNZ) | 23 |
| Scottish Albums (Official Charts) | 61 |
| Swiss Albums (Schweizer Hitparade) | 45 |
| UK Albums (Official Charts) | 34 |
| UK Dance Albums (Official Charts) | 4 |
| UK Album Downloads (Official Charts) | 24 |
| UK Independent Albums (Official Charts) | 4 |
| US Billboard 200 | 34 |
| US Top Dance Albums (Billboard) | 1 |
| US Independent Albums (Billboard) | 8 |

=== Year-end charts ===
| Chart (2013) | Position |
|---|---|
| Australian Dance Albums (ARIA) | 18 |
| Belgian Albums (Ultratop Flanders) | 58 |
| Belgian Albums (Ultratop Wallonia) | 153 |
| French Albums (SNEP) | 178 |

== Certifications ==
Certifications for "Free the Universe"
| Region | Certification | Certified units/sales |
|---|---|---|
| New Zealand (RMNZ) | Platinum | 15,000^{‡} |
^{‡} Sales+streaming figures based on certification alone.
