= Guns Don't Kill People... Lazers Do =

Studio album by Major Lazer
- Released: June 16, 2009
- Recorded: 2009
- Genres: EDM; dancehall; reggae; funk carioca; bounce; moombahton
- Length: 41:54
- Label: Downtown
- Producers: Diplo; Switch

Major Lazer chronology
Guns Don't Kill People... Lazers Do (2009)	Lazers Never Die (2010)

Singles from Guns Don't Kill People... Lazers Do
- 1. "Hold the Line" Released: April 20, 2009; 2. "Keep It Goin' Louder" Released: June 18, 2009; 3. "Pon de Floor" Released: August 3, 2009; 4. "Jump Up" Released: 2009

Alternative cover
- 15th Anniversary edition cover

Singles from Guns Don't Kill People... Lazers Do (15th Anniversary Edition)
- 1. "Nobody Move" Released: October 10, 2024; 2. "Where's The Daddy" Released: November 7, 2024; 3. "Pon De Streets" Released: November 15, 2024

Guns Don't Kill People... Lazers Do is the debut studio album by the Jamaican-American electronic dance music band Major Lazer, released on June 16, 2009, which at the time consisted of Diplo and Switch. The album is heavily influenced by Jamaican dancehall music and features guest appearances from Jamaican artists on every track.

== Reception ==
Guns Don't Kill People...Lazers Do
Aggregate scores
Source	Rating
Metacritic	(77/100)
Review scores
Source	Rating
AllMusic	4.5/5 stars
The Guardian	4/5 stars
NME	(7/10)
Pitchfork Media	(8.1/10)
Paste	(9.3/10)
PopMatters	(7/10)
Prefix Magazine	(8/10)
Rolling Stone	3.5/5 stars
Spin	(7/10)
Vibe	(favourable)

Guns Don't Kill People... Lazers Do was critically acclaimed among release, Rhapsody called it the 10th best album of 2009. After the album's release, Major Lazer was commercially and critically accepted amongst the reggae community and are often credited for changing the dancehall, reggae and moombahton community and genres, making them more commercially accepted in the United States.

== Track listing ==
No.	Title	Writer(s)	Length
1.	"Hold the Line" (featuring Mr. Lex and Santigold)	Thomas Pentz; Dave Taylor; Christopher Palmer; Santi White	3:38
2.	"When You Hear the Bassline" (featuring Ms. Thing)	Pentz; Taylor	3:18
3.	"Can't Stop Now" (featuring Mr. Vegas and Jovi Rockwell)	Pentz; Taylor; Clifford Smith; Joelle Carpenter; Curtis Mayfield	4:03
4.	"Lazer Theme" (featuring Future Trouble; additional production by DJA)	Pentz; Taylor	2:31
5.	"Anything Goes" (featuring Turbulence)	Pentz; Taylor; Sheldon Campbell	3:13
6.	"Cash Flow" (featuring Jah Dan)	Pentz; Taylor; Wayne Henry; Andrew Bain	4:06
7.	"Mary Jane" (featuring Mr. Evil and Mapei)	Pentz; Taylor; Craig Parkes; Jackie Cummings	3:27
8.	"Bruk Out" (featuring T.O.K. and Ms. Thing)	Pentz; Taylor; Alistaire McCalla; Roshaun Clarke; Craig Thompson; Xavier Davidson; John Carter; Manuel Joseph Parrish; Raul A. Rodriguez	2:54
9.	"What U Like" (featuring Amanda Blank and Einstein)	Pentz; Taylor; Amanda McGrath; Jermaine Shaw	2:25
10.	"Keep It Goin' Louder" (featuring Nina Sky and Ricky Blaze; additional production by Ricky Blaze)	Pentz; Taylor; Ricardo Johnson; Nicole Albino; Natalie Albino	3:46
11.	"Pon de Floor" (featuring Vybz Kartel; additional production by Afrojack)	Pentz; Taylor	3:33
12.	"Baby" (featuring Prince Zimboo)	Pentz; Taylor; Assaney Morris	1:17
13.	"Jump Up" (featuring Leftside and Supahype; co-produced by Crookers)	Pentz; Taylor; Parkes; Andrea Fratangelo; Francesco Barbaglia	3:43

iTunes Store deluxe edition
No.	Title	Length
14.	"Zumbie" (featuring Andy Milonakis)	4:00
15.	"When You Hear the Bassline" (Dance Area Remix; featuring Ms. Thing)	6:48
16.	"When You Hear the Bassline" (Dance Area Remix Dub Version; featuring Ms. Thing)	5:51
17.	"Hold the Line" (Toadally Krossed Out Remix; featuring Mr. Lex and Santigold)	2:53

Special edition: Lazers Never Die EP
No.	Title	Length
14.	"Sound Of Siren" (featuring M.I.A. and Busy Signal)	3:49
15.	"Good Enuff" ("Cash Flow" Dub; featuring Collie Buddz and Lindi Ortega)	2:49
16.	"Bruk Out" (Buraka Som Sistema Mix)	6:19
17.	"Can't Stop Now" (Kicks Like a Mule Remix; featuring Mr. Vegas, Jovi Rockwell and Azealia Banks)	5:14
18.	"Jump Up" (Thom Yorke Remix)	4:48

15th Anniversary Edition
No.	Title	Length
14.	"Zumbie" (featuring Andy Milonakis)
15.	"Pon de Streets" (featuring Afrojack)
16.	"Where's the Daddy?" (featuring M.I.A.)
17.	"Nobody Move" (featuring Vybz Kartel)
Total length:		55:20

== Charts ==
Chart (2009)	Peak position
US Billboard 200	169
US Top Electronic Albums	7
US Top Heatseekers	4
