= Major Lazer =

American electronic music group

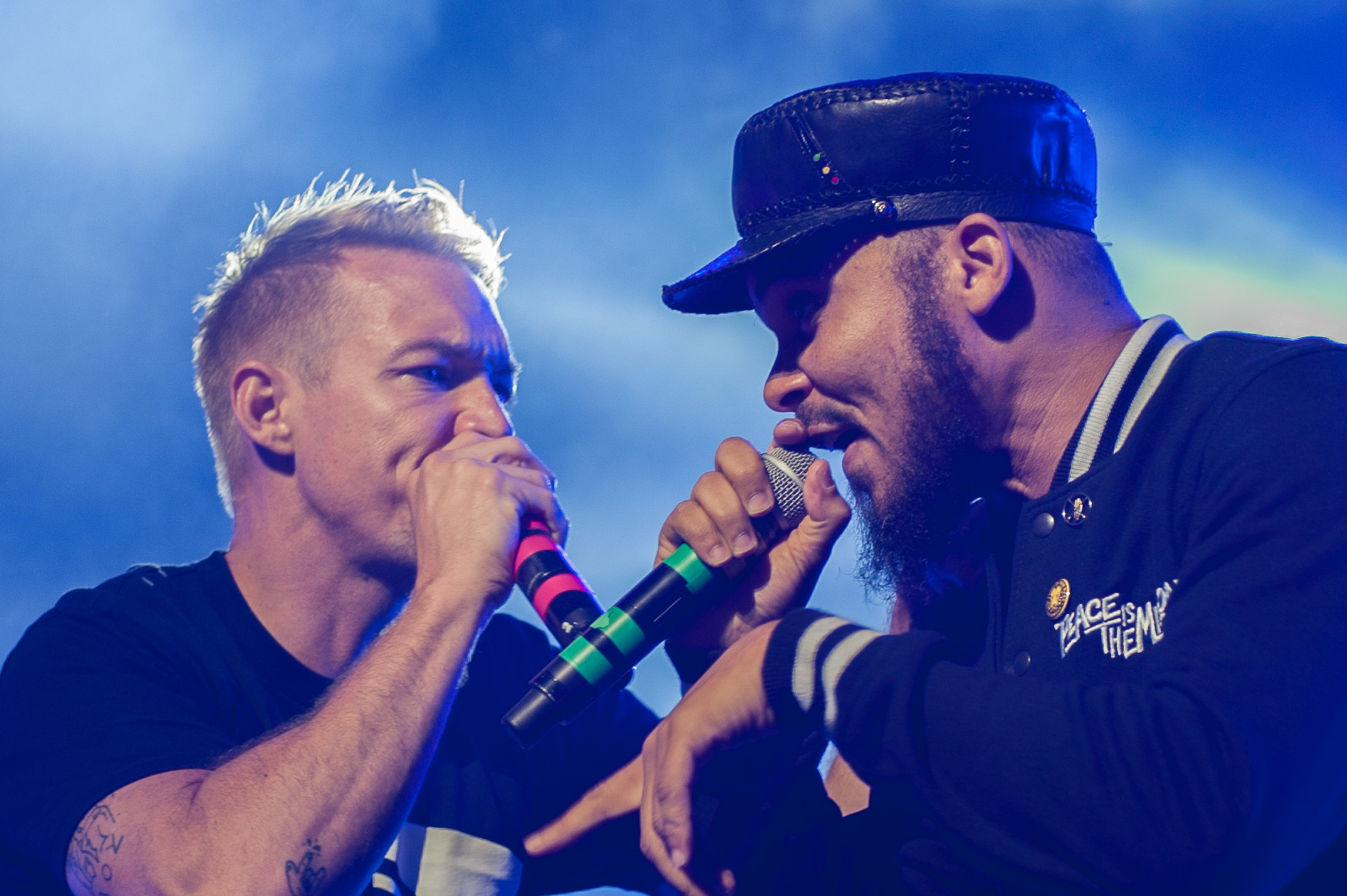
- Diplo and Walshy Fire of Major Lazer performing at Flow Festival in Helsinki on August 14, 2015

Background information
- Origin: Los Angeles, California, U.S.
- Genres: EDM; dancehall; reggae; hip hop; moombahton; trap; reggae fusion; electro house; soca; rocksteady; reggaeton
- Works: Major Lazer discography
- Years active: 2008–present
- Labels: Secretly Canadian; Downtown; Columbia; Mad Decent
- Members: Diplo; Walshy Fire; Ape Drums; America Foster
- Past members: Switch; Jillionaire

Major Lazer is an American electronic dance music and DJ group, which includes record producer Diplo, and DJs Walshy Fire, Ape Drums and vocalist America Foster. They were founded in 2008 by Diplo and Switch, with Switch leaving after three years in 2011. He was then replaced by both Jillionaire and Walshy Fire. In June 2019, Jillionaire left the group and was replaced by Ape Drums. In 2025, British-Jamaican artist and Internet personality America Foster joined the group. Their music spans numerous genres, mixing reggae with dancehall, ReggaeEDM, reggaeton, soca, house and moombahton.

Major Lazer has released four full-length albums: Guns Don't Kill People... Lazers Do in 2009, Free the Universe in 2013, Peace Is the Mission in 2015, and Music Is the Weapon in 2020. They have also released six EPs, including Apocalypse Soon in March 2014, which featured vocal contributions from Pharrell Williams and Sean Paul, and Know No Better in 2017, which featured appearances from Camila Cabello, Quavo, Travis Scott, and J Balvin, among others. Major Lazer has also notably produced Reincarnated, the debut reggae album by Snoop Dogg under his "Snoop Lion" persona. In March 2018, Billboard ranked Major Lazer at number five on their 2018 Billboard Dance 100 ranking of dance musicians.

== History ==
=== 2009–11: Guns Don't Kill People... Lazers Do and Lazers Never Die EP ===
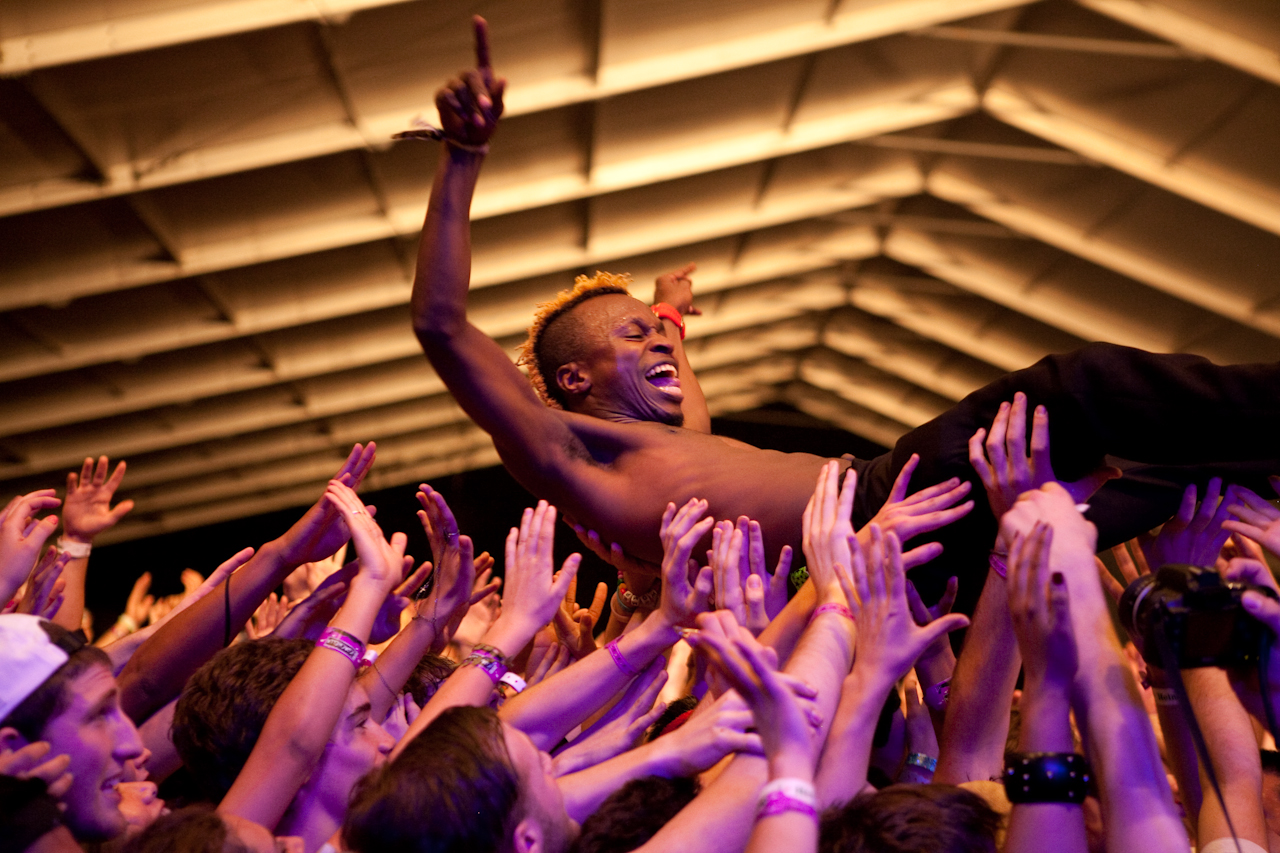
Skerrit Bwoy with Major Lazer at Coachella Festival, 2010.

Originally made up of DJs Diplo and Switch, the two were introduced while working with M.I.A. The duo's first album Guns Don't Kill People... Lazers Do was released on June 16, 2009, on Downtown Records. It was recorded in Jamaica at Tuff Gong Studios. Vocalists such as Santigold, Vybz Kartel, Ward 21, Busy Signal, Nina Sky, Amanda Blank, Mr. Vegas, Turbulence, Mapei, T.O.K, Prince Zimboo, Leftside, and M.I.A., with others contributing guest vocals to the album, as well as additional production from Afrojack, Nebat Drums and Crookers. This is the first release to come out of the label partnership between Downtown Records and Diplo's label Mad Decent. Major Lazer ended a US tour summer of 2009.

The album's first single was "Hold the Line", the video for which, directed by Eric Wareheim, was nominated for a MTV Video Award in the Breakthrough Video category. It was also featured in the video game FIFA 10. The track "Zumbie" has a music video that features comedian Andy Milonakis. Music videos for the songs "Pon de Floor", "Keep It Going Louder", and "Bubble Butt" were directed by Eric Wareheim. In June 2009, Major Lazer were featured for the first time on the cover of the publication The Fader, in its 62nd issue.

Major Lazer performed at the Falls Music & Arts Festival (Lorne, Victoria, Australia) on December 30, 2009, and the Coachella Music Festival in April 2010. They also performed at the Pitchfork Music Festival in July 2010 and the Sasquatch Music Festival on Monday May 30, 2011 and at the 2011 Outside Lands festival in San Francisco.

A mixtape with La Roux titled "Lazerproof" was made available for free download on May 26. It used the instrumental tracks from the self-titled debut album and "brazenly mashes them up with beats and rhymes that are almost wholly up-to-the-minute hip, encompassing rap, R&B, dancehall, and dubstep". On June 20, 2010, the group released an EP titled Lazers Never Die. It contained two new songs and three remixes, by Thom Yorke and others. Switch provided production for Beyoncé's "Run the World (Girls)", which sampled "Pon de Floor". Major Lazer also features in the track, "Look at Where We Are", from the extended version of Hot Chip's album In Our Heads, released June 2011.

=== 2012–15: Free the Universe, Apocalypse Soon EP, and Peace Is the Mission ===
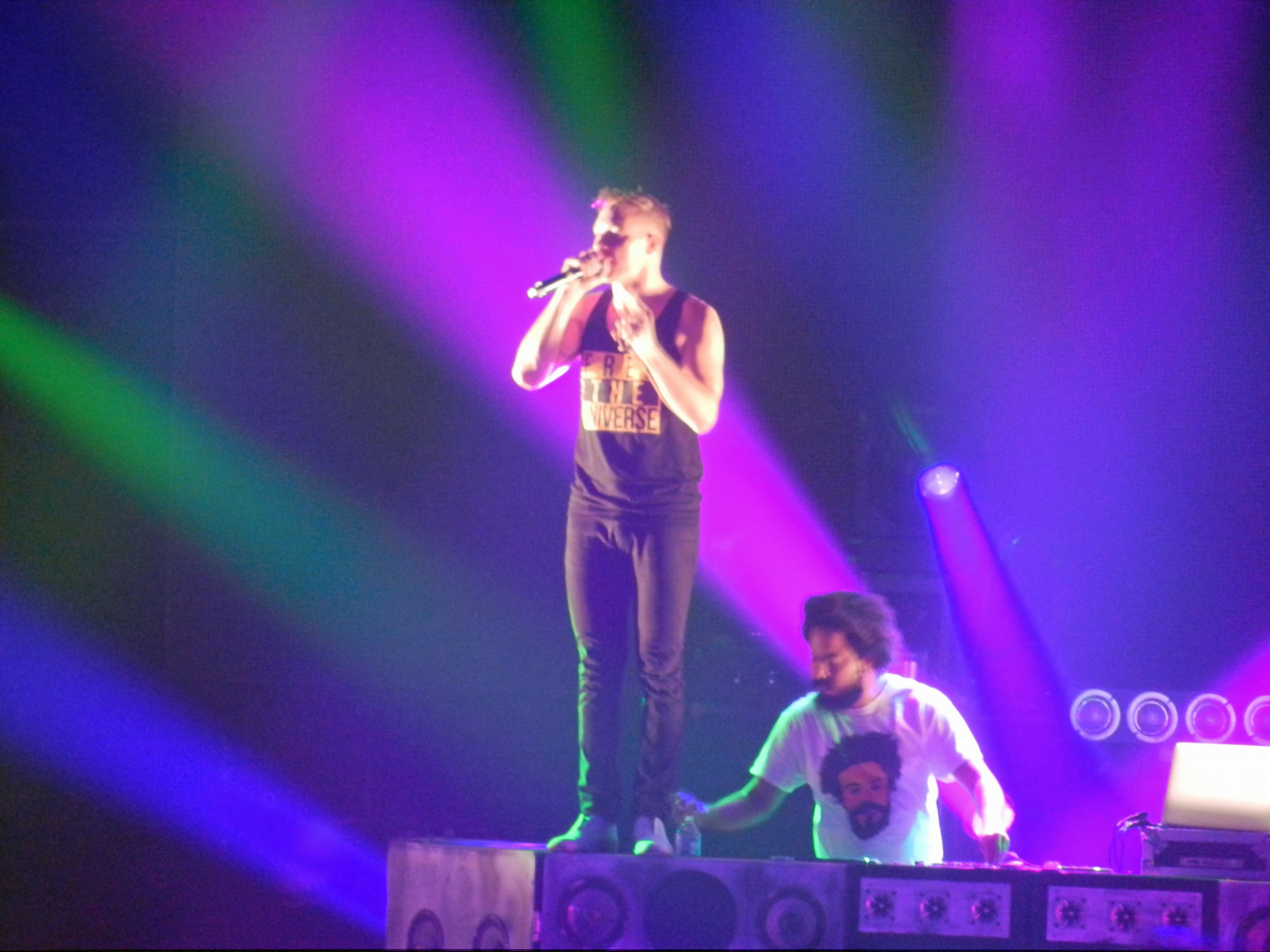
Diplo and Jillionaire performing at the Congress Theater, Chicago, in 2013.

Major Lazer's live shows previously included hype man Skerrit Bwoy, although he left the group in 2012 to pursue religion. In 2012, Major Lazer began working with Snoop Dogg to produce some tracks that were to be included on his new reggae project. Along with the project came his new alter ego persona known as "Snoop Lion".

In 2012, Switch left the collaborative effort due to "creative differences" as claimed by Diplo. He departed in late 2011 and was replaced with both Jillionaire and Walshy Fire while Boaz van de Beatz and Jr. Blender featured as an additional producers.

In September 2012, Major Lazer announced that its upcoming album, Free the Universe, would be released on March 12, 2013, on Mad Decent. They also announced Fall 2012 tour dates.

Major Lazer co-produced UK singer Rita Ora's debut album, Ora and with No Doubt for their sixth studio album, Push and Shove. The album's title track features producers Major Lazer and Jamaican reggae artist Busy Signal, and was released as a promotional single in August 2012 reaching no. 22 at Alternative Song Chart Sales.

In February 2013, Major Lazer signed with indie record label Secretly Canadian. At the same time, they announced the new release date, April 16, for their album Free the Universe. They also announced the Free the Universe 2013 World Tour, which ran through the spring of 2013 with support by Dragonette, Angel Haze, and Lunice.

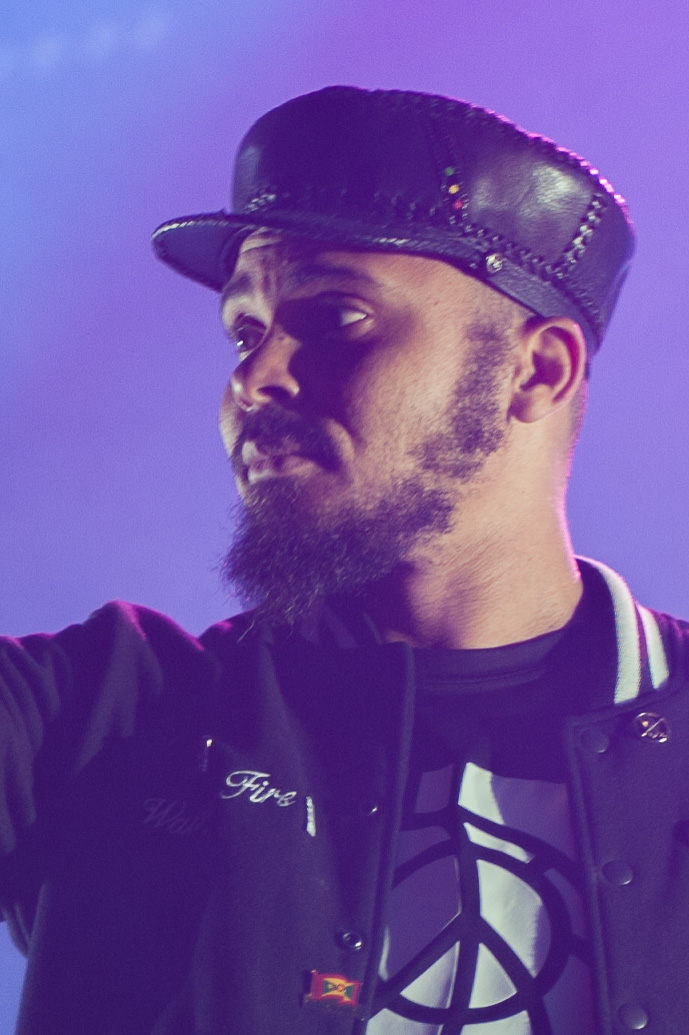
Walshy Fire of Major Lazer performing at Flow Festival in Helsinki, Finland, August 2015

In early March 2015, Diplo confirmed the release of a third Major Lazer album. The first single, "Lean On", was a collaboration with French producer DJ Snake and featured vocals from Danish recording artist MØ. It was released March 2, 2015. The song was first offered to Rihanna and then Nicki Minaj, who both turned it down; however Diplo later mentioned that no one could have done a better job than MØ in the recording. The song reached number 4 on the US Billboard's Hot 100 chart and number 2 in the UK charts. It also became Spotify's most streamed song of all time, receiving universally positive reviews while reaching over 2 billion views on YouTube, making it the twelfth most viewed video on the site.

Four promotional singles were released; "Roll the Bass" March 23, 2015, "Night Riders", a collaboration with Travi$ Scott, 2 Chainz, Pusha T and Mad Cobra, released April 20, 2015, and "Too Original", a collaboration with Elliphant and Jovi Rockwell, released on May 11, 2015. On June 2, 2015, a lyric video was released for "Be Together", a collaboration with Wild Belle, making it the fourth promotional single.

The second single from the album, titled "Powerful", featured English singer-songwriter Ellie Goulding and Jamaican singer Tarrus Riley. It was released simultaneously with the album, and was added to BBC Radio 1's playlist on June 21, 2015. It reached the Top 10 in Australia and Poland.

In an interview with inthemix on May 22, 2015, Walshy Fire announced that Major Lazer's fourth studio album would be titled Music Is the Weapon and that it would be released late 2015 or early 2016. The album never arrived in 2015 or 2016, though Diplo did reveal on April 27, 2015, during an interview with Belgian radio station Studio Brussel that Major Lazer was working on a new track with Belgian singer Selah Sue, and that it might appear on their next album. Selah Sue herself had confirmed this during an earlier interview with the same radio station on May 4, 2015.

Peace Is The Mission was released on June 1, 2015. It featured artists such as Machel Montano, Wild Belle, Pusha T, Ellie Goulding, and Ariana Grande. It peaked at number 12 on the Billboard 200 chart and received general critical success.

On November 27, 2015, Major Lazer released a re-issue of their third studio album Peace is the Mission, re-titled as Peace is the Mission: Extended. It featured five additional songs, including a collaboration with Dutch electro house DJ MOTi (featuring Ty Dolla $ign, Wizkid, and Kranium), a remix of their previous track "Light It Up" featuring Nyla and Fuse ODG, and a cover of Frank Ocean's "Lost" featuring previous collaborator and Danish recording artist MØ.

On November 5, 2015, Major Lazer featured on Katy B's single ''Who Am I'' alongside Craig David.

Exactly one year after Peace is the Mission was released, Major Lazer announced a new remix album titled Peace Is the Mission: Remixes. It featured remixes of selected tracks from their third studio album, including "Lean On", "Powerful", "Be Together", "Night Riders", and "Roll the Bass". Major Lazer had over 27 million tags in music identification service Shazam in 2015. This, along with Diplo's other collaboration Jack Ü, gave Diplo the greatest number of Shazams in 2015.

=== 2016–19: Know No Better EP, Essentials and Africa Is the Future EP ===
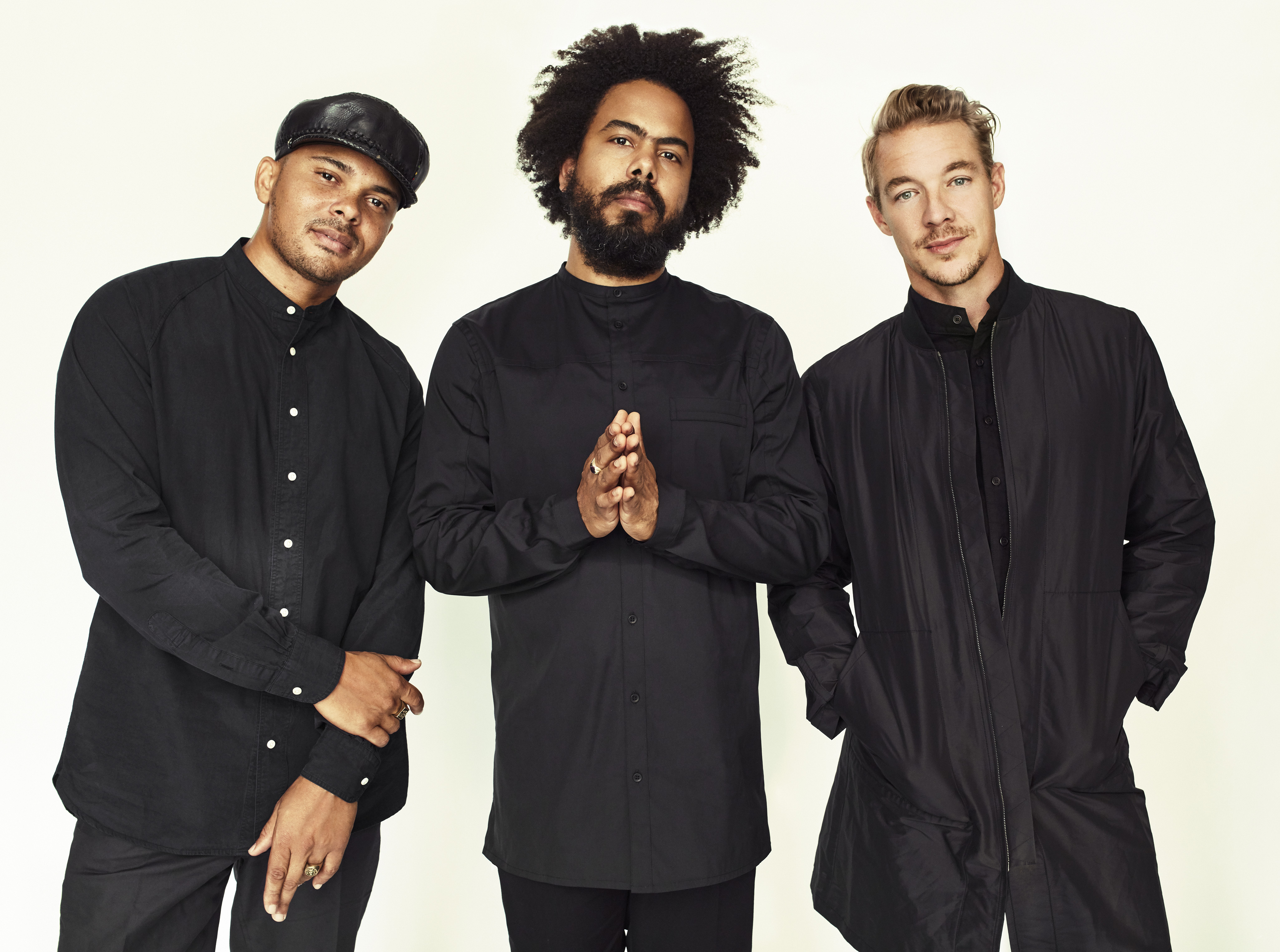
Major Lazer's 2016 promotional photo

On July 22, 2016, a new track titled "Cold Water", featuring vocals from MØ and Justin Bieber, was released by Major Lazer. It debuted at No. 2 on the Billboard Hot 100, and number 1 in several other countries including on the UK Official Charts, making it their most popular single yet. On September 30, 2016, "Believer", a collaboration with Dutch production duo Showtek, was released as the second single from Major Lazer's upcoming fourth album. The album's title, Music Is the Weapon, had been announced in May 2015, and was set to have "a few more club songs, a few more festival songs" than Peace is the Mission, but to be "in the same spectrum."

On December 6, 2016, Major Lazer released a promotional single for Music Is the Weapon, titled "My Number". The song is a collaboration with Bad Royale that samples "54-46 That's My Number", which Pitchfork describes as "a genre-defining classic from legendary ska/reggae group Toots and the Maytals." The song contains newly recorded vocals from frontman Toots Hibbert specifically designed for Major Lazer, changing the original lyrics to incorporate the group into the song while keeping the original melody.

Following the success of singles "Cold Water" and "Believer", Major Lazer released their third single titled "Run Up" January 26, 2017. The song features Canadian musician PartyNextDoor and rapper Nicki Minaj, serving as a follow-up to the tropical, laid-back sound of "Cold Water". Music Is the Weapon, however, still failed to arrive, prompting rumors that Major Lazer would not be releasing an album after all. However, in 2018, Diplo stated that the album will be released in 2019 and that it will be their last.

On June 1, 2017, Major Lazer released a six-song extended play titled Know No Better, with the title track featuring Camila Cabello, Travis Scott, and Quavo. The EP's second single, "Sua Cara", features Brazilian musicians Anitta and Pabllo Vittar. Several remixes of the EP's title track have since been released.

On October 19, 2018, Major Lazer released a compilation album titled Major Lazer Essentials, a 10-year anniversary record that includes all of Major Lazer's greatest hits, and new songs including "Blow That Smoke", featuring Tove Lo, which was released October 17, 2018.

On March 20, 2019, Major Lazer released an extended play titled Africa Is the Future.

=== 2019–present: Jillionaire's departure and Music Is the Weapon ===
On May 10, 2019, Major Lazer released the song "Can't Take It from Me", featuring Skip Marley, as the new lead single for their fourth studio album. In June 2019, Jillionaire left the group to focus on solo projects, and was replaced by American DJ and record producer Ape Drums. The album's second single, "Que Calor", featuring J Balvin and El Alfa, was released September 11, 2019. The album's fifth single, "Lay Your Head on Me", featuring Marcus Mumford of the band Mumford & Sons, was released on March 26, 2020.

In a 2019 interview with Complex Magazine, Diplo revealed that the album would be titled Lazerism, but the name was later changed back to the original title, Music Is the Weapon, and was released on October 23, 2020.

They performed at the closing ceremony of the Milano Cortina 2026 Winter Olympics at the Verona Arena in Verona, Italy.

== Band members ==
This is a list of the members of Major Lazer.

=== Current members ===
- Diplo – production (2008–present)
- Walshy Fire – production (2011–present)
- Ape Drums – production (2019–present)
- America Foster – vocals (2025–present)

=== Former members ===
- Switch – production (2008–2011)
- Jillionaire – production (2011–2019)

== Discography ==
- Guns Don't Kill People... Lazers Do (2009)
- Free the Universe (2013)
- Peace Is the Mission (2015)
- Music Is the Weapon (2020)

== Television series ==
A Major Lazer animated series premiered April 16, 2015, on FXX. Diplo serves as co-creator and executive producer of the show.

== Awards and nominations ==
Year	Awards	Category	Nominee/Work	Outcome	Ref
2015	GAFFA Awards (Denmark)	Best Foreign Song	"Lean On"	Won	
2016	NRJ Music Awards	Best Live Performance	Major Lazer	Nominated	
2016	NRJ Music Awards	Best Single Dance/Electro	"Light It Up"	Nominated	
2016	NRJ Music Awards	Best Collaboration of the Year	Major Lazer	Won	
2016	Billboard Music Awards	Top Dance/Electronic Song	Lean On	Won	
2016	American Music Awards	Favorite Artist – Electronic Dance Music	Major Lazer	Nominated	
2016	Berlin Music Video Awards	Best Cinematography	LIGHT IT UP	Nominated	
2017	iHeartRadio Music Awards	Dance Artist of the Year	Major Lazer	Nominated	
2017	iHeartRadio Music Awards	Dance Song of the Year	"Cold Water"	Nominated	
2017	Kids' Choice Awards	Favorite DJ/EDM Artist	Major Lazer	Nominated	
2017	Billboard Music Awards	Top Dance/Electronic Artist	Major Lazer	Nominated	
2017	Billboard Music Awards	Top Dance/Electronic Song	"Cold Water"	Nominated	
2017	Teen Choice Awards	Choice Electronic/Dance Artist	Major Lazer	Nominated	
2017	MTV Video Music Awards	Best Dance Video	"Cold Water"	Nominated	
2017	Electronic Music Awards	Single of the Year	"Cold Water"	Won	
2017	Electronic Music Awards	Remix of the Year	"Shape of You" (Major Lazer Remix)	Nominated	
2018	Latin Grammy Awards	Best Urban Fusion/Performance	"Sua Cara"	Nominated	
2018	GAFFA Awards (Denmark)	Best Foreign Band	Major Lazer	Nominated	
2020	Latin Grammy Award	Best Urban Song	"Rave de Favela" (with MC Lan, Anitta, BEAM)	Nominated	
2020	NRJ Music Awards	International Group Of The Year	Major Lazer	Nominated	
2020	Grammy Awards	Best Dance/Electronic Album	Music is the Weapon	Nominated	
2022	Berlin Music Video Awards	Best VFX	C'EST CUIT	Nominated	
2026	Berlin Music Video Awards	Best Cinematography	"Brukdown"	Nominated	
