= Tofo Tofo Dance group =

Tofo Tofo Dance Group is made up of three Mozambican men who integrated kwaito music and pantsula dance, which originates from South Africa, to create their own unique type of dance that has become internationally celebrated. This new form of movement has brought local African dance onto a global stage.

== Background ==
The word "tofo" means body shaking in the local Mozambique language of Maputo, the area the members of this group are from. The group creates this expression of movement through their combination of dance and music. Both the kwaito music and pantsula dance originated in South Africa as ways of expression during the time of Apartheid.

=== Kwaito ===
The music genre that the Tofo Tofo dance troupe dances to is called kwaito music, a form of South African house music. This genre started developing in the 1990s. The term kwaito is derived from the Afrikaans word kwaii, which means strict or angry, although in more common and contemporary use the word is a loose translation of the English term cool. The language used in kwaito music is that of South African township slang, called Isicamtho. e origination and development of kwaito has had a significant impact on South African culture to the extent that it is seen as a lifestyle as much as a music genre. The blend of black urban style and modern influences contribute to its constant evolution – much like South Africa itself. One of the first kwaito singles to become a big hit in South Africa was "Kaffir" by Arthur Mafokate. This single illustrated the freedom of expression resulting from political liberation in South Africa. The first kwaito group was Boom Shaka.

Kwaito music has a distinct sound. It is an urban sound that is richly textured and expressive. Its dance beat has roots in South African music styles such as mbaqanga and dancehall, as well as house and disco. Typically at a slower tempo range than other styles of house music that it stems from, kwaito music often contains catchy melodic and percussive loop samples, deep bass lines, and vocals. One distinctive feature of this genre is the manner in which the lyrics are sung, rapped and shouted. American producer Diplo has described kwaito as "slowed-down garage music" most popular among the black youth of South Africa. Kwaito is not performed by a live band. The music tracks are manufactured digitally in a studio, and then played as a backing track on stage.

In kwaito music, township culture is being celebrated by its youth. In South Africa, close to half of the population is under the age of twenty-one years, kwaito music has helped shape a spirit of optimism and self-confidence by being the new sound of the township. Kwaito music is about the township, knowing about the township, understanding the township, walking the walk, talking the talk and more importantly, being proud of these things. Kwaito has been known as the expression of new freedom, and many anti-Apartheid chants have been used as lyrics for kwaito songs. In this sense, kwaito has led post-Apartheid township culture into the mainstream culture. The lyrics of this genre convey the street language of the townships.

=== Pantsula ===
The type of dance that the Tofo Tofo dance troupe use in their movements is called the pantsula dance. Pantsula became a popular form of dance in the 1980s when it was used as a means of expression during violent Apartheid times in South African townships, starting mainly in the streets of Soweto. The dance originated when townships first became exposed to transistor radios and people became aware and intrigued by international pop music trends. In the 1960s and 1970s, the culture of pantsula was commonly associated with troublemakers and gangsters - troubled youths who defined themselves with aggressive ways of walking, talking and dancing. Pantsula dance has slowly migrated out of the townships and has emerged in the commercial area. It remains popular today in townships, cities and built up areas.

Pantsula is an energetic and spontaneous expression of the lives of people in the townships. It is described as a flat-footed African tap-and-glide style of dance. The term pantsula means to "waddle like a duck" or alternatively to walk with protruded buttocks, which is a characteristic of the dance. In many ways, pantsula is akin to modern day hip-hop. It is similar to Western-style break dancing for the people in South Africa. They would dance using props, such as brooms, cans or sticks, musical instruments such as large bass drums and dance theatrically as if they were performing on Broadway. The competitive spirits of pantsula footwork, rhythm and beat were revealed in the streets, characterised by competitions of who could perform the most creative dance of pantsula.

The evolution of pantsula is shown through the transition from a township thug dance to the fame of the Tofo Tofo dance troupe. Pantsula provides a freedom of expression, free from prejudice. In community life, pantsula is important because it can keep kids focused and away from bad influences. One example of pantsula dance having a positive community impact is the dance group, Real Action. This crew has starred in TV commercials, music videos and road shows and also provided mentorship and role models for aspiring young dancers.

== Members of the group ==
The group is led by Mario Abel Buce, known as Kwela, and Xavier Manuel Campione, known as Xavitto, both of whom are widely recognised in Mozambique for their distinctive dance moves.

=== Experience ===
Xavitto and Kwela have performed at many wedding parties, private events, and have had many local shows. Videos of their performances have been put up on YouTube by their audiences to present their talents to a larger, international audience.

=== Rise to fame ===
American singer Beyoncé Knowles came across a YouTube video of this group performing. After five months of searching for these men with help from the US Embassy in Maputo, the Tofo Tofo Dance Group was found and flown out to Los Angeles, California to introduce and instruct Beyoncé and her dancers their native dance moves as well as be a part of the music video to Beyoncé's hit, "Run the World (Girls)". The group was inspired and adored by both Beyoncé and her international audience, making the Tofo Tofo Dance Group a tremendous success and a worldwide phenomenon. Their native influence was rewarded when Beyoncé won the MTV Video Music Awards Best Choreographed Music Video in 2011 as well as the Soul Train Music Awards Best Dance Performance of 2011.

=== Current activities ===
After their big break with Beyoncé, the men of Tofo Tofo have continued their performances with other international artists. They have performed as opening acts for Fat Joe and Ciara; however this time, it was in Mozambique, their native land. In 2018, they reunited with Beyoncé for her headlining performance at the Global Citizen Festival: Mandela 100. They have continued to perform locally at weddings and other private events.
