= Pantsula =

South African tradition and dance form

Pantsula is a tradition and also a highly energetic dance form that originated in the black townships of South Africa during the apartheid era. It developed into a form of social commentary for black South Africans and has undergone several transformations with the country's changing political tides.

== Origins and history ==
Pantsula dance emerged in the 1950s and 1960s as a response to the forced removals implemented by the apartheid government, shortly after its ascent to power. It began in Alexandra and Sophiatown, two townships in Johannesburg, as groups of older men engaged in informal street dance competitions. Gradually the dance form spread throughout South Africa. By the 1980s, pantsula was practiced by black South Africans of all ages and was no longer limited to men. It began to develop more political overtones. Pantsula was used as an expression of resistance during the political struggle then occurring against the apartheid government, as well as being used to spread awareness about social issues such as AIDS.

After the end of apartheid in 1994, pantsula persisted as an expression of cultural roots for many black South Africans. It also gained popularity in the white community of South Africa and has begun to take on new meanings as a dance form for all.

== Technique ==
Pantsula is a syncopated, quick-stepping, low to the ground form of dance which evokes the urban street culture of which it is a part of. It is performed by groups of dancers who practice together for many hours each week. It provides a powerful, stylized form of expression. As one pantsula dancer describes it, "we have drive, we are one, we have power, we are young, strong and quick, we have our own style and we are competitive."

It developed from the Sotho dances of mqaquanga and marabi, with influence from 1930s American jazz. Later evolutions of pantsula dancing in the 1980s were influenced by American hip hop and breakdance. Quick, darting steps in geometric lines with an uneven rhythmic quality characterize this form of movement. The Charleston, a knock-kneed manoeuvre from American jazz, as well as the popping and locking found in US hip hop, are also found in this form of dance. The word pantsula is Zulu, and refers to a dance style. This flat-footed dance move makes use of mostly your limbs and has an exaggeration to it.

Pantsula has three styles: Western style, slow poison, and futhuza. Western style is the most typically found form, and it is highly rigorous. The arms remain wrapped around an upright torso while the feet move in extremely fast and particular shuffling and jumping movements as groups of dancers move in and out of geometric formations. This form requires good physical command of the body. Slow poison is like Western style in form, with mostly stationary arms and intricate lower body movements, but it is performed in a slow, steady fashion with a constant beat. Futhuza is infused with elements of American breakdancing and hiphop. This form utilizes the somewhat disjointed, sometimes fluid, robotic motion of popping and locking.

== Music ==
Originally, pantsula dancers did not have access to recorded music and danced to live music, including voices like Bra Sello and "Big Voice Jack" Lerole. As radios became more readily available, dancers opted for international and US pop music, calling on icons like Michael Jackson as well as rappers including MC Hammer and P Diddy. However, in the 1990s, a particular type of music for pantsula emerged: kwaito. This multilingual music is typical of the myriad of cultures in South Africa, and is a blend of seSotho, isiZulu, English, and Afrikaans. It is strong and sharp, like pantsula, and projects a streetwise, gangster image.

== Popular culture ==
Pantsula was featured in the 2018 music video "All the Stars" by the artist Kendrick Lamar.

Pantsula dancing is the subject of Tjo Vitjo, a hyper-reality South African TV series created in 2017 by documentarian Vincent Moloi and starring Warren Masemola and Rapulana Seiphemo. It is currently (2022) running on Netflix.

In 2021, Netflix's dance-series drama, Jiva! set in the township of Umlazi in Durban, showcased pantsula alongside other South African dance styles.

In 2015, French singer-songwriter Jaine had released a song titled "Makeba" from her album Zanaka which had incorporated elements of world music and served as an ode to the renowned world music South African political activist and musician Miriam Makeba.The music video for the song was filmed in South Africa and showcased pantsula dancers. In 2023, the song went viral on Tik Tok and Instagram sparked by a meme featuring American actor and comedian Bill Harder dancing to the song.

== See also ==
- African dance
- Tofo Tofo Dance group
