= Master of My Make-Believe =

2012 studio album by Santigold

Studio album by Santigold
- Released: April 24, 2012
- Recorded: 2010–2011
- Studios: Downtown (New York); Echo Sound (Los Angeles); Federal Prism (Beverly Hills); Geejam (Portland)
- Genres: Electronic; new wave; alternative dance; dubtronica; reggae fusion
- Length: 37:45
- Labels: Atlantic; Downtown
- Producers: Santigold; Switch; Greg Kurstin; John Hill; Diplo; Q-Tip; Ricky Blaze; Boys Noize; Buraka Som Sistema; David Andrew Sitek

Santigold chronology
Top Ranking (2008)	Master of My Make-Believe (2012)	99¢ (2016)

Singles from Master of My Make-Believe
- 1. "Big Mouth" Released: January 19, 2012; 2. "Disparate Youth" Released: February 22, 2012; 3. "The Keepers" Released: June 22, 2012

Master of My Make-Believe is the second studio album by American musician and singer Santigold, released in the United Kingdom on April 24, 2012, and in the United States on May 1, through Downtown and Atlantic Records. The album features contributions from a wide range of musicians, including long-time collaborators John Hill, Switch and Diplo, as well as Dave Sitek of TV on the Radio and Karen O of the Yeah Yeah Yeahs. The cover art of the album, designed by Jason Schmidt, represents four incarnations of Santigold. The album received positive reviews from music critics, and earned Santigold her first number one on the Billboard Dance/Electronic Albums chart, and reached number 21 on the US Billboard 200 and number 33 on the UK Albums Chart.

== Release ==
Master of My Make-Believe was preceded by the singles "Big Mouth" and "Disparate Youth". The song "Go" featuring Karen O premiered in April 2011, but was not available for purchase until the release of the album. In May 2012, Santigold posted a photo on Instagram from the set of the video for "The Keepers", which was released as the third single on June 22, 2012.

== Critical reception ==
Professional ratings
Aggregate scores
Source	Rating
Metacritic	74/100
Review scores
Source	Rating
AllMusic	4/5 stars
Chicago Tribune	3.5/4 stars
Entertainment Weekly	B+
The Independent	4/5 stars
Los Angeles Times	3.5/4 stars
Pitchfork	6.3/10
PopMatters	8/10
Rolling Stone	3/5 stars
Slant Magazine	4/5 stars
Spin	9/10

At Metacritic, which assigns a normalized rating out of 100 to reviews from mainstream publications, Master of My Make-Believe received an average score of 74, based on 37 reviews, indicating "generally favorable reviews". AllMusic said the album is "the kind of album that can fully define her sound, but is still multifaceted and well crafted enough to be exciting." Chicago Tribune felt that "White's subversive way with a hook and her ability to effortlessly blend dance beats from around the world make Master of My Make-Believe a deceptively breezy and enticing summer album." Los Angeles Times wrote, "Throughout, Santigold never stops playing spin-the-globe, and she also never loses sight of her mission to keep listeners moving." Entertainment Weekly stated that the album's "disgruntled machine-raging and spiky new-wave rhythms evoke both the urgency of early U2 and the agit-pop ire of M.I.A.—while delivering more direct danceability than either." Roberrt Alford of PopMatters wrote, "I would place this album among the strongest work coming out in both the realms of indie and pop music these days, and though it may not inspire the level of critical and popular veneration that her first album enjoyed, it's a welcome return by one of the most inventive and inspired recording artists working today." Slant Magazine's Kevin Liedel said, "Santigold's trademark irreverence and penchant for high-energy anthems delivers her sophomore effort from the potential downfalls of miscellany."

Pitchfork critic Carrie Battan gave the album a less favorable review, stating: "A polished assortment of tidily global-sounding, mid-tempo pop tunes that seem to end before they ever kick off, strung together by a checklist of semi-impassioned capital-K Keywords: Youth, Machine, Riot, Fame, Freak, Pirate, Keepers." Rosen Jody of Rolling Stone wrote, "Her songs sound great but feel off, merely gesturing in the direction of emotions. In the end, she's so cool she'll frost up your earbuds." Paste thought that "Master of My Make-Believe is by no means a disappointment, but it falls short of the expectation that has been gestating for the past four years."

== Track listing ==
No.	Title	Writer(s)	Producer(s)	Length
1.	"Go!" (featuring Karen O)	Santigold; Karen O; Nick Zinner; Dave Taylor; Kamaal Fareed; Guy Battarel; Jean-Pierre Massiera	Santigold; Switch; Q-Tip	3:23
2.	"Disparate Youth"	Santigold; Zinner; Ricardo Johnson	Santigold; Ricky Blaze	4:44
3.	"God from the Machine"	Santigold; Johnson; Greg Kurstin	Kurstin; Santigold^{[a]}; Switch^{[b]}	3:52
4.	"Fame"	Santigold; David Andrew Sitek; Stéphanie Sokolinski	Sitek	3:29
5.	"Freak Like Me"	Santigold; John Hill; Taylor	Hill; Switch	2:18
6.	"This Isn't Our Parade"	Santigold; Zinner; Hill; Sitek	Santigold; Hill; Sitek^{[b]}	3:54
7.	"The Riot's Gone"	Santigold; Zinner; Taylor; Kurstin	Kurstin; Switch^{[a]}	3:29
8.	"Pirate in the Water"	Santigold; Taylor; Jesse Novak; Thomas Wesley Pentz	Santigold; Switch; Diplo	2:54
9.	"The Keepers"	Santigold; Hill; Kurstin	Kurstin	3:32
10.	"Look at These Hoes"	Santigold; Pentz; Alexander Ridha; Naeem Juwan	Santigold; Diplo; Boys Noize; Switch^{[b]}; Hill^{[b]}	2:57
11.	"Big Mouth"	Santigold; Taylor; João Barbosa; Rui Pité; Karla Rodrigues	Switch; Buraka Som Sistema	3:11

iTunes deluxe edition bonus tracks
No.	Title	Writer(s)	Producer(s)	Length
12.	"Never Enough"			3:19
13.	"Go!" (Switch Remix; featuring Karen O)	White; O; Zinner; Taylor; Fareed; Battarel; Massiera	Switch	3:39
14.	"Disparate Youth" (music video)			3:51

Notes

- ^{^[a]} signifies a co-producer
- ^{^[b]} signifies an additional producer

== Personnel ==
Credits adapted from the liner notes of Master of My Make-Believe.

Musicians

- Santigold – vocals (all tracks), drums (tracks 3, 9), keyboards (track 9), piano (track 7)
- Karen O – vocals (track 1)
- Nick Zinner – guitar (tracks 1, 2, 7), keyboards (track 6)
- Jahphet Landis – drums (track 1)
- Anthony Burlitch – drums (track 6)
- John Morrical – keyboards (track 6)
- Greg Kurstin – drums (track 9), keyboards (track 9), piano (tracks 7), all other instruments (tracks 3, 7, 9)
- John Hill – keyboards (track 6)

Technical

- Santigold – executive production, production (tracks 1, 2, 6, 8, 10), co-production (track 3)
- Switch – production (tracks 5, 8, 11), co-production (tracks 7), additional production (tracks 3, 10), mixing (tracks 1, 8, 11)
- Greg Kurstin – production (tracks 3, 7, 9)
- John Hill – production (tracks 5, 6), additional production (track 10)
- Diplo – production (tracks 8, 10)
- David Andrew Sitek – production (track 4), additional production (track 6)
- Ricky Blaze – production (track 2), programming (track 2)
- Q-Tip – production (track 1)
- Boys Noize – production (track 10)
- Buraka Som Sistema – production (track 11)
- Chris Coady – engineering
- Jesse Shatkin – engineering
- Bryan Gottshall – engineering
- Chris Allen – engineering
- Chris Kasych – engineering
- Sayyd Droullard – engineering
- Zeph Sowers – engineering
- Rich Costey – mixing (tracks 2–7, 9, 10)
- Eddy Schreyer – mastering

Artwork

- Jason Schmidt – photography
- Kehinde Wiley – painting

== Charts ==
=== Weekly charts ===
Weekly chart performance for Master of My Make-Believe
Chart (2012)	Peak position
Australian Albums (ARIA)	16
Austrian Albums (Ö3 Austria)	35
Belgian Albums (Ultratop Flanders)	27
Belgian Albums (Ultratop Wallonia)	51
Canadian Albums (Nielsen SoundScan)	34
Dutch Albums (Album Top 100)	62
French Albums (SNEP)	65
German Albums (Offizielle Top 100)	26
Irish Albums (IRMA)	25
New Zealand Albums (RMNZ)	31
Swiss Albums (Schweizer Hitparade)	16
UK Albums (Official Charts)	33
UK Dance Albums (Official Charts)	4
US Billboard 200	21
US Top Alternative Albums (Billboard)	5
US Top Dance Albums (Billboard)	1
US Top Rock Albums (Billboard)	8

=== Year-end charts ===
Year-end chart performance for Master of My Make-Believe
Chart (2012)	Position
US Top Dance/Electronic Albums (Billboard)	13
