= Cesare Wright =

American documentary filmmaker

Cesare Wright is an American documentary filmmaker.

Wright completed his MFA in Cinematic Arts at the University of Southern California. In 2002, Wright received the Louis Sudler Award in Humanities at Rice University for his ethnographic documentary film Back to the Primitive, which explores issues of including human suspension, body modification, S&M performance, and Satanic and Luciferian stage rituals. Wright also worked as a news editor for Fox 26 News in Houston, TX. While filming Border Wars, a documentary about paramilitary civilian activity along the U.S./Mexico border, Wright recorded one of the first documented incursions of Mexican soldiers across the U.S. border. In 2007, Wright directed Goals, a film exploring issues of immigration and assimilation vicariously through sports, which premiered on The Documentary Channel and NYC Media. Material from his films has aired on numerous national and international broadcasts, including Fox, Telemundo, Spiegel TV, and France 2. The industry premiere of Border Wars was held at the Karlovy Vary International Film Festival. Working with the Gracie family, founders of Brazilian jiu-jitsu, Wright directed the Gracie Women Empowered series, which released in June 2011.

== Research ==
In 2004, Wright co-founded the Kino-Eye Center for Visual Innovation, which conducts visual cultural research and supports applied media production. As a Provost's Fellow, his PhD research at the Univ. of Rochester includes Film & media production and theory, representational "truth", documentary film theory and production, visual anthropology, theorizing the Sublime, transnational and diasporic representation, violence and social trauma, "ecstatic truth" and the cinema of Werner Herzog, rhetoric of the frame, ethnographic film, horror genre and theory in cinema. For his work in film production and visual cultural research, Wright was featured as a Distinguished Alumnus by the Rice University Dept. of Visual Arts.
