= Turbulence (musician) =

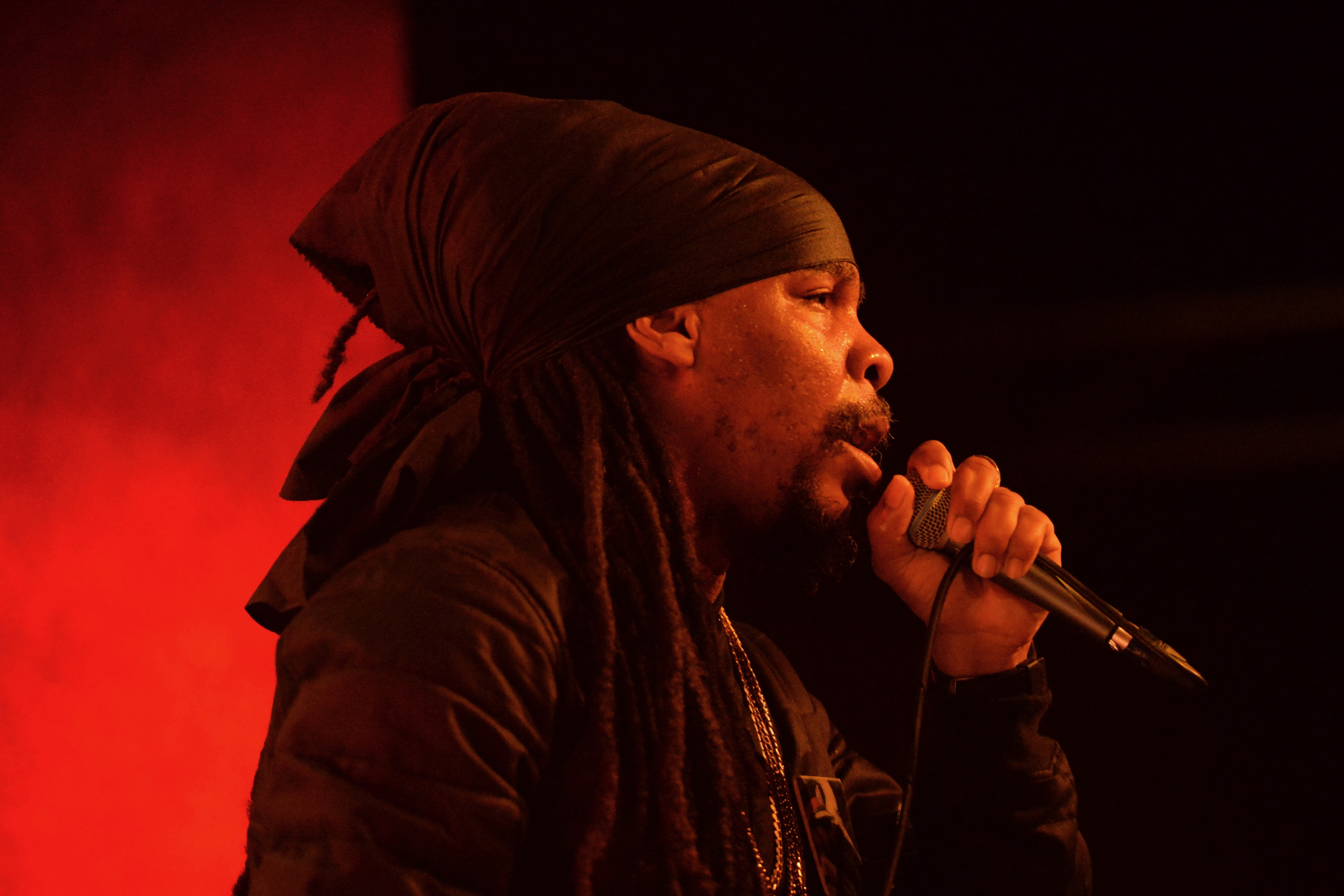
- Turbulence, Zappa Antwerp, October 19, 2019, Belgium.

Background information
- Also known as: Sheldon Campbell
- Born: 11 January 1980 (age 46)
- Origin: Jamaica
- Genres: Reggae; Dancehall
- Occupation: Singer
- Years active: 1999–present

Turbulence (born Sheldon Campbell on 11 January 1980) is a Jamaican reggae artist. He is a self-proclaimed member of the Rastafari movement. He was discovered in 1999 by Philip "Fatis" Burrell. He has released a number of albums including I Believe, United, Notorious - The Album, Songs of Solomon, Triumphantly, Join Us and Hail The King and was featured in an episode of the BBC documentary series Storyville. He is also known for his song "Blood dem out" which was featured on a highly profiled freestyle ski movie called "Show and Prove".

== Rise Up documentary ==
Turbulence was featured as one of three main acts in the 2007 documentary film Rise Up, which explores the world of underground music in Jamaica. The film documents Turbulence's rise to prominence as an internationally recognized and nationally celebrated reggae artist, and highlights the political and socially active nature of his music.

Rise Up has screened at numerous film festivals including IDFA and Hot Docs, and the film won the Best Music Documentary category at the AFI/Discovery Channel Silverdocs Festival. The film also aired on the BBC and enjoyed a well received theatrical debut in Jamaica, where it was reviewed by the Jamaican Observer as the "Rise of a new Classic". Throughout the film, Turbulence voices the problems of post-colonial corruption, poverty, and violence in Jamaica.

The breakout single, "Notorious", brought Turbulence international acclaim. First released in 2004 on the Scallawah riddim, "Notorious" rose to Number 1 on local and international Reggae/Dancehall charts in Jamaica, New York City, London, Toronto and Japan in 2005, bolstered by the supporting music video by Rise Up director and cinematographer Luciano Blotta. The track was re-released as the feature track of the Notorious album in 2006. Turbulence went to another number one song with a collaboration featuring Reggae's new voice and Rastafarian ambassador Khalilah Rose.The song Unite and Be Strong charted on Argentina's urban mixx for ten weeks.

== Discography ==
=== Albums ===
Studio Albums
Title	Release date	Label	Format
Rising	2001	VP Records	CD (album)
Different Thing	2003	Minor 7 Flat 5	CD (album)
The Truth	2003	RAS Records	CD (album)
The Future	2003	Charm	CD (album)
Join Us	2003	Bogalusa	CD (album)
Hail to the King	2003	VP Records	CD (album)
Triumphantly	2005	Kingston Records	CD (album)
Songs of Solomon	2005	VP Records	CD (album)
I Believe	2005	M Records	CD (album)
Born for This	2006	Charm	CD (album)
Notorious	2006	VP Records	CD (album)
The Perfect Balance	2006	Redd Army	CD (album)
X-Girlfriend	2006	Tad's Record	CD (album)
Do Good, Ninja Tune	2007	Minor 7 Flat 5	CD (album)
United	2007	Kingston Records	CD (album)
Stronger Than Before	2007	Cousins	CD (album)
Do Good	2007	Minor 7 Flat 5	CD (album)
Love Me For Me	2007	Love Injection Production	CD (album)
Celebration Of Life	2012	Tad's Record	CD (album)
Real Life Stories	2014	Love Injection Production, VPAL Music	CD (album)
The Remedy	2021	Never Stop Productions	CD (album)
