= Switch (music producer) =

English producer, songwriter and DJ

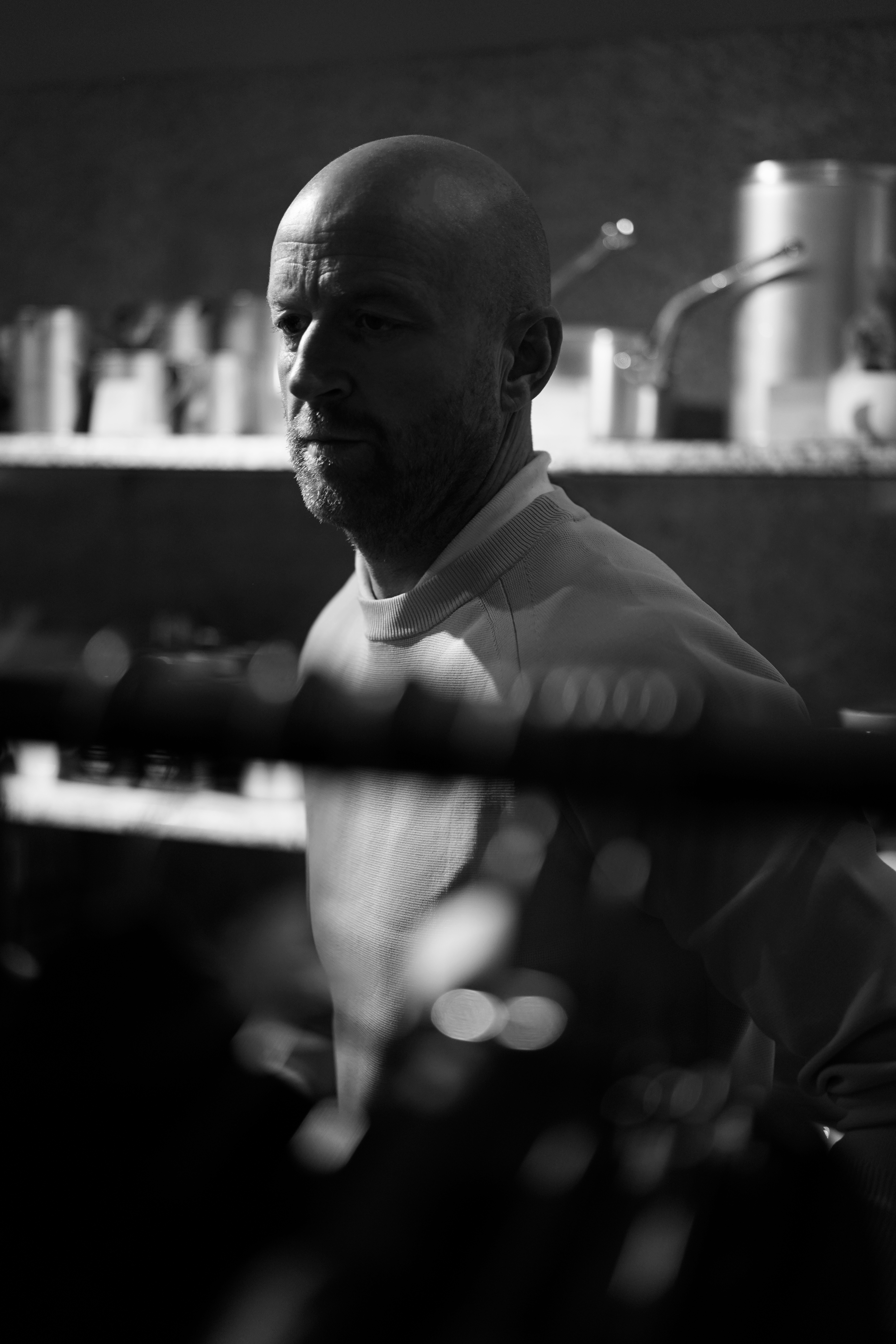
- Switch in Tokyo, 2018

Background information
- Also known as: Switch; A. Brucker; Solid Groove
- Born: David James Andrew Taylor
- Origin: London, England
- Genres: Electronic; house
- Occupations: Record producer; songwriter; DJ; engineer
- Instrument: Turntables
- Years active: 2003–present
- Formerly of: Major Lazer

David James Andrew Taylor, better known by his stage name Switch, is an English record producer, songwriter, DJ, and sound engineer. He is best known for his work with Beyoncé, M.I.A. and Major Lazer, of which he was a founding member. He was nominated at the 51st Annual Grammy Awards in the Record of the Year category for "Paper Planes" by M.I.A., which he co-produced with Diplo. Other artists he has produced include Christina Aguilera, Chaka Khan, Santigold, and Brandy among many others. He has released various singles under his own name, and is also well known for remixing and producing for many major artists.

Switch is the founder and owner of the independent record label Diary Records, founded in 2018.

== Collaborations ==
Most notably, Switch has worked extensively with fellow British artist M.I.A., co-producing tracks on her albums Arular, Kala, and Matangi. For the latter, he travelled to work with M.I.A. in A. R. Rahman's Panchathan Record Inn and AM Studios and other locations such as Kodambakkam, Chennai and Trinidad and Tobago. He said in an interview with Flaunt magazine in 2010: "When you go somewhere like India, and especially Jamaica, it puts you in a different train of thought, outside your usual working conditions. They use music as their voice; they use it for politics, for religion. So, I think for people that are struggling, they can use it to vent frustrations, or to celebrate".

In 2009, Switch collaborated with fellow producer Diplo (whom he met through M.I.A.) to create the album Guns Don't Kill People... Lazers Do under the name Major Lazer. In 2010, they released the EP Lazers Never Die. However, he left the group in 2011.

In 2019, Switch released Chaka Khan's record Hello Happiness through his independent record label Diary Records.

== Discography ==
=== Studio albums ===
- 2009 Guns Don't Kill People... Lazers Do (with Major Lazer)

=== Mix albums ===
- 2006 House Bash-Up Mix (given away free with Mixmag)
- 2008 Fabric Live.43 – Get Familiar (Mixed by Sinden)

=== Singles ===
- 2003 "Get Ya Dub On"
- 2004 "Get on Downz"
- 2005 "Just Bounce 2 This"
- 2005 "This is Sick"
- 2006 "A Bit Patchy"
- 2011 "I Still Love You"

=== Production discography ===
- 2004 "Love Guide" w/ Ms. Thing, Two Culture Clash, Wall of Sound
- 2005 M.I.A. "Arular": Pull Up The People, Bucky Done Gun
- 2007 M.I.A. "Kala": Bamboo Banga, Bird Flu, Boyz, Jimmy, Hussel, 20 Dollar, World Town, XR2, Far Far
- 2008 Santigold "Santigold": You'll Find a Way, Shove It, Say Aha, Creator, Starstruck, Anne
- 2010 Christina Aguilera "Bionic": Bionic, Elastic Love, Monday Morning, Bobblehead
- 2010 M.I.A. "Maya": Steppin Up, Teqkilla, Born Free, lovealot
- 2011 Beyoncé "4": Run The World, End of Time
- 2011 Alex Clare "The Lateness of the Hour" (album) [with Diplo and Mike Spencer]
- 2012 Santigold "Master of My Make-Believe": GO!, Freak Like Me, Pirate in the Water, Big Mouth
- 2012 Brandy "Two Eleven": Slower
- 2013 Kerli "Utopia": Sugar
- 2013 M.I.A. "Matangi": Karmageddon, MATANGI, Only 1 U, Come Walk With Me, aTENTion, Exodus, Bring The Noize, Lights
- 2019 Chaka Khan "Hello Happiness"

=== Remixes ===
Songs that Switch has remixed include:

- 2003 Audio Bullys – "Way Too Long"
- 2003 The Chemical Brothers – "Get Yourself High"
- 2003 Futureshock – "Late at Night"
- 2004 Basement Jaxx – "Right Here's the Spot"
- 2004 The Chemical Brothers – "Galvanize"
- 2004 Faithless – "Miss U Less, See U More"
- 2004 Half Pint – "Red Light Green Light"
- 2004 Magik Johnson – "Feel Alright (Solid Groove Remix)"
- 2004 Jentina – "French Kisses"
- 2004 Shaznay Lewis – "You"
- 2004 Mondo Grosso – "Fire & Ice"
- 2005 Basement Jaxx – "Fly Life Xtra"
- 2005 BodyRockers – "Round & Round"
- 2005 Dubble D – "Switch"
- 2005 Evil Nine – "Pearl Shot"
- 2005 Infusion – "The Careless Kind"
- 2005 Les Rythmes Digitales – "Jacques Your Body (Make Me Sweat)"
- 2005 X-Press 2 – "Give It"
- 2006 Lily Allen – "LDN"
- 2006 Coldcut – "True Skool"
- 2006 Def Inc – "Waking the Dread"
- 2006 Fatboy Slim – "Champion Sound"
- 2006 The Futureheads – "Worry About It Later"
- 2006 Jaydee – "Plastic Dreams"
- 2006 Kelis – "Bossy"
- 2006 MYNC Project feat. Abigail Bailey – "Something on Your Mind"
- 2006 Sharon Phillips – "Want 2 / Need 2"
- 2006 Playgroup – "Front 2 Back"
- 2006 Spank Rock – "Bump"
- 2007 Basement Jaxx – "Hey U"
- 2007 The Black Ghosts – "Face"
- 2007 Klaxons – "Golden Skans"
- 2007 P. Diddy – "Tell Me"
- 2007 Freeform Five – "No More Conversations"
- 2007 Just Jack – "Glory Days"
- 2007 DJ Mehdi – "I Am Somebody"
- 2007 Mika – "Love Today"
- 2007 Nine Inch Nails – "Capital G"
- 2007 Simian Mobile Disco – "I Believe"
- 2007 Speaker Junk – "Foxxy"
- 2007 Ben Westbeech – "Dance with Me"
- 2007 Robbie Williams – "Never Touch That Switch"
- 2007 Jacknife Lee – "Making Me Money"
- 2007 Radioclit – "Divine Gosa"
- 2007 Armand Van Helden – "Je T'Aime"
- 2007 Santigold – "You'll Find a Way"
- 2007 Santigold – "L.E.S. Artistes"
- 2008 Blaqstarr feat. Rye Rye – "Shake It to the Ground"
- 2008 Late of the Pier – "Space and the Woods"
- 2008 Laughing Boy and the Wrath of Khan – "PM Chalkman"
- 2008 Santigold – "Shove It"
- 2008 Underworld – "Boy, Boy, Boy"
- 2008 Mystery Jets – "Hideaway"
- 2009 Björk – "Náttúra"
- 2010 Sugababes – "Wear My Kiss"
- 2010 Christina Aguilera – "Bionic, Monday Morning, Bobblehead, Elastic Love"
- 2011 TV on the Radio – "Will Do"
- 2011 Ke$ha – "Animal"
- 2012 M.I.A. – "Bad Girls"
- 2013 Kylie Minogue – "Skirt"
- 2015 Roots Manuva – "Crying"
- 2018 Chaka Khan – "Like Sugar"
- 2026 Derek Piotr - Divine Supplication (Solid Groove)
