= Santigold discography =

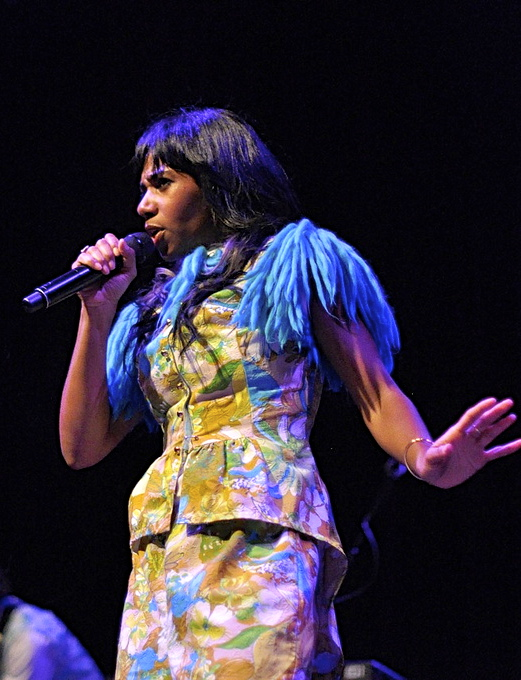
- Santigold performing in Boston, 2012
- Studio albums: 4
- Extended plays: 1
- Singles: 22
- Music videos: 11
- Mixtapes: 2

American musician Santi White, better known by her stage name Santigold (formerly Santogold), has released four studio albums, two mixtapes, one extended play (EP), and twenty-two singles (including eight as a featured artist). White's discography under the name Santogold consists of her eponymous debut album, six singles, one mixtape, and four music videos, all of which were released in 2008, except the single "Creator", which was released in late 2007. Santogold peaked at number 74 on the Billboard 200, and reached numbers 2 and 6 on Billboard's Dance/Electronic Albums and Independent Albums, respectively. The album also charted in Belgium, France, the Netherlands, and the United Kingdom.

In 2009, White changed her stage name from Santogold to Santigold due to legal issues, and released a live EP via iTunes, which peaked at number 20 on Billboard's Dance/Electronic Albums chart. The same year, Santigold collaborated with N.E.R.D and Julian Casablancas on the non-album single "My Drive Thru", made as part of an advertising campaign by Converse. She has also made guest appearances on numerous albums by other artists such as Jay-Z, N.A.S.A., and Drake, and has produced and written music for many other artists, including Christina Aguilera, Ashlee Simpson, GZA, Lily Allen, and Res.

Her second studio album, Master of My Make-Believe (2012), topped the Dance/Electronic Albums chart and reached number 21 on the Billboard 200. In the following two years, she contributed to various soundtracks, including The Hunger Games: Catching Fire, The Heat, Girls and Paper Towns. Her third studio album, 99¢, was released in 2016, and her first officially released mixtape, I Don't Want: The Gold Fire Sessions, in 2018.

This discography covers White's solo career, and therefore does not include her work with the band Stiffed on their 2005 album Burned Again and their 2003 extended play Sex Sells.

== Albums ==
=== Studio albums ===
List of studio albums, with selected chart positions and certifications
Title	Album details	Peak chart positions										Sales	Certifications
Title	Album details	US	AUS	BEL (FL)	BEL (WA)	FRA	IRL	NLD	NZ	SWI	UK	Sales	Certifications
Santogold	Released: April 29, 2008; Label: Downtown; Formats: CD, LP, digital download	74	64	25	—	110	45	34	—	—	26	US: 225,000	BPI: Gold
Master of My Make-Believe	Released: May 1, 2012; Label: Atlantic; Formats: CD, LP, digital download	21	16	27	51	65	25	62	31	16	33		
99¢	Released: February 26, 2016; Label: Atlantic; Formats: CD, LP, digital download	55	64	67	178	165	90	—	—	51	178		
Spirituals	Released: September 9, 2022; Label: Little Jerk; Formats: CD, LP, digital download	—	—	—	—	—	—	—	—	—	—		

=== Mixtapes ===
Title	Album details	Peak chart positions	
Title	Album details	BEL (FL)	BEL (WA)
Top Ranking: A Diplo Dub (with Diplo)	Released: July 28, 2008; Label: Mad Decent; Formats: CD, digital download	—	—
I Don't Want: The Gold Fire Sessions	Released: July 27, 2018; Label: Downtown; Formats: Digital download, LP (in 2019)	159	180

== Extended plays ==
Title	EP details	Peak chart positions
Title	EP details	US Elec.
iTunes: Live from SoHo	Released: April 14, 2009; Label: Lizard King; Format: Digital download	20

== Singles ==
=== As lead artist ===
List of singles as lead artist, with selected chart positions, showing year released and album name
Title	Year	Peak chart positions										Certifications	Album
Title	Year	US	AUT	BEL (FL)	BEL (WA)	FRA	GER	JPN	SCO	SWI	UK	Certifications	Album
"Creator"	2007	—	—	—	—	—	—	—	—	—	120		Santogold
"L.E.S. Artistes"	2008	— (Note: "L.E.S. Artistes" did not enter the Billboard Hot 100, but peaked at number 44 on the US Hot Singles Sales chart.)	—	— (Note: "L.E.S. Artistes" did not enter the Flanders Ultratop 50, but peaked at number 15 on the Ultratip chart.)	—	—	—	—	26	—	27		Santogold
"My Drive Thru" (with Julian Casablancas and N.E.R.D)	2008	—	—	—	—	—	—	—	—	—	—		non-album single
"Lights Out"	2008	—	—	—	—	—	—	—	52	—	103		Santogold
"Say Aha"	2008	—	—	— (Note: "Say Aha" did not enter the Flanders Ultratop 50, but peaked at number 15 on the Ultratip chart.)	—	—	—	—	64	—	157		Santogold
"Big Mouth"	2012	—	—	—	—	—	—	—	—	—	—		Master of My Make-Believe
"Disparate Youth"	2012	— (Note: "Disparate Youth" did not enter the Billboard Hot 100, but peaked at number nine on the Bubbling Under Hot 100 Singles chart.)	70	38	36	104	26	94	—	55	96	BPI: Gold; BVMI: Gold	Master of My Make-Believe
"The Keepers"	2012	—	—	— (Note: "The Keepers" did not enter the Flanders Ultratop 50, but peaked at number three on the Ultratip chart.)	— (Note: "The Keepers" did not enter the Wallonia Ultratop 50, but peaked at number 14 on the Ultratip chart.)	—	—	—	—	—	—		Master of My Make-Believe
"Radio"	2015	—	—	—	—	—	—	—	—	—	—		Paper Towns (Music from the Motion Picture)
"Can't Get Enough of Myself"	2015	—	—	— (Note: "Can't Get Enough of Myself" did not enter the Flanders Ultratop 50, but peaked at number 75 on the Ultratip chart.)	—	—	—	—	—	— (Note: "Can't Get Enough of Myself" did not enter the Swiss Singles chart, but charted at number 70 on the Swiss Airplay chart.)	—		99¢
"Who Be Lovin' Me" (featuring ILoveMakonnen)	2015	—	—	—	—	—	—	—	—	—	—		99¢
"Chasing Shadows"	2016	—	—	—	—	—	—	—	—	—	—		99¢
"Banshee"	2016	—	—	—	—	—	—	—	—	—	—		99¢
"Run the Road"	2018	—	—	—	—	—	—	—	—	—	—		I Don't Want: The Gold Fire Sessions
"High Priestess"	2022	—	—	—	—	—	—	—	—	—	—		Spirituals
"Ain't Ready"	2022	—	—	—	—	—	—	—	—	—	—		Spirituals
"Nothing"	2022	—	—	—	—	—	—	—	—	—	—		Spirituals
"Shake"	2022	—	—	—	—	—	—	—	—	—	—		Spirituals
"Fall First"	2022	—	—	—	—	—	—	—	—	—	—		Spirituals
"My Horror"	2022	—	—	—	—	—	—	—	—	—	—		Spirituals
"—" denotes releases that did not chart.

=== As featured artist ===
List of singles as featured artist, with selected chart positions, showing year released and album name
Title	Year	Peak chart positions						Album
Title	Year	US	US R&B	US Rap	BEL (FL)	BEL (WA)	MEX Air.	Album
"Brooklyn Go Hard" (Jay-Z featuring Santogold)	2008	—	61	18	—	—	—	Notorious: Music from and Inspired by the Original Motion Picture
"Gifted" (N.A.S.A. featuring Santogold, Kanye West, Lykke Li)	2009	—	—	—	—	—	—	The Spirit of Apollo
"Please Don't" (with David Byrne and Fatboy Slim)	2010	—	—	—	—	—	—	Here Lies Love
"Don't Play No Game That I Can't Win" (Beastie Boys featuring Santigold)	2011	— (Note: "Don't Play No Game That I Can't Win" did not enter the Billboard Hot 100, but peaked at number seven on the US Hot Singles Sales chart.)	80	—	— (Note: "Don't Play No Game That I Can't Win" did not enter the Flanders Ultratop 50, but peaked at number eight on the Ultratip chart.)	—	28	Hot Sauce Committee Part Two
"Car Song" (Spank Rock featuring Santigold)	2011	—	—	—	— (Note: "Car Song" did not enter the Flanders Ultratop 50, but peaked at number four on the Ultratip chart.)	50	—	Everything Is Boring and Everyone Is a Fucking Liar
"NbHD" (OneRepublic featuring Santigold)	2016	—	—	—	—	—	—	Oh My My
"Worry No More" (Diplo featuring Lil Yachty, Santigold)	2018	—	—	—	— (Note: "Worry No More" did not enter the Flanders Ultratop 50, but charted as an "extra tip" on the Ultratip chart.)	— (Note: "Worry No More" did not enter the Wallonie Ultratop 50, but charted as an "extra tip" on the Ultratip chart.)	—	California
"Glad I Tried" (Matt and Kim featuring Kevin Ray, Travis Hawley, Santigold)	2018	—	—	—	—	—	15	Almost Everyday
"Man Next Door" (U-Roy and Santigold)	2021	—	—	—	—	—	—	Solid Gold U-Roy
"MPC 2021" (DJ Mehdi and Busy P featuring Santigold, Benjamin Epps)	2022	—	—	—	—	—	—	—
"Santiladang" (Master Peace with Santigold)	2024	–	–	–	–	–	–	
"—" denotes releases that did not chart.

== Guest appearances ==
List of non-single guest appearances, with other performing artists
Title	Year	Other artist(s)	Album
"Stay in Line"	2002	GZA	Legend of the Liquid Sword
"Photograph"	2005	Hezekiah	Hurry Up & Wait
"Pretty Green" (The Jam cover)	2007	Mark Ronson	Version
"Bang Bang"	2007	Trouble Andrew	Trouble Andrew
"Licky (Work It Out)" (Hervé Goes Low remix)	2008	Steve Aoki, Larry Tee, Princess Superstar	Pillowface and His Airplane Chronicles
"Hold the Line"	2009	Major Lazer, Mr. Lexx	Guns Don't Kill People... Lazers Do
"Whachadoin?"	2009	N.A.S.A., Spank Rock, M.I.A, Nick Zinner	The Spirit of Apollo
"Unstoppable"	2009	Drake, Lil' Wayne	So Far Gone
"Saga"	2009	Basement Jaxx	Scars
"Please Don't"	2010	David Byrne	Here Lies Love
"After Party"	2011	The Lonely Island	Turtleneck & Chain
"Dougou Badia"	2012	Amadou & Mariam	Folila
"Hell"	2013	ASAP Rocky	Long. Live. ASAP
"You're No Good"	2013	Major Lazer, Vybz Kartel, Danielle Haim, Yasmin	Free the Universe
"Shooting Arrows at the Sky"	2013	—N/a	The Hunger Games: Catching Fire – Original Motion Picture Soundtrack
"Rock This"	2013	—N/a	The Heat (Original Motion Picture Soundtrack)
"Girls"	2013	—N/a	Girls, Vol. 1 (Music from the HBO Original Series)
"Kicking Down Doors"	2014	—N/a	Pepsi Beats of the Beautiful Game
"Forever"	2015	iLoveMakonnen, 1st	I Love Makonnen 2
Give It All	2017	With You., Vince Staples	Power Rangers (Original Motion Picture Soundtrack)
"Solidarité"	2017	-M-, Toumani Diabaté, Sidiki Diabaté, Hiba Tawaji, Ibrahim Maalouf, Seu Jorge, Nekfeu, Youssou N'Dour, Sanjay Khan, Chacha	Lamomali
"Lights On"	2018	Tyler, the Creator, Ryan Beatty	Music Inspired by Illumination & Dr. Seuss' The Grinch
"Wild and Lethal Trash!"	2021	GoldLink, Fire!	HARAM!
"The Underground"	2021	Megan Hilty, Megan Nicole Doug, Kimiko Glenn	Centaurworld S1: (Music from the Netflix Original Series)
"Do You Do You Know"	2021	Mark Ronson, Kathleen Hanna	Watch the Sound (Original Soundtrack)
"Holes Matter"	2021	Megan Hilty, Kimiko Glenn	Centaurworld S2: (Music from the Netflix Original Series)

== Credits ==
List of songs written or produced by White for other artists, showing year released and album name
Title	Year	Artist(s)	Album	Credit(s)
"Beneath the Surface"	1999	GZA	Beneath the Surface	Writing
"700 Mile Situation"	2001	Res	How I Do	Co-production, writing
"Golden Boys"	2001	Res	How I Do	Writing
"They-Say Vision"	2001	Res	How I Do	Writing
"Sittin' Back"	2001	Res	How I Do	Writing
"How I Do"	2001	Res	How I Do	Writing
"If There Ain't Nothing"	2001	Res	How I Do	Writing
"The Hustler"	2001	Res	How I Do	Writing
"I've Known the Garden"	2001	Res	How I Do	Writing
"Let Love"	2001	Res	How I Do	Writing
"Tsunami / Say It Anyway"	2001	Res	How I Do	Writing
"Littlest Things"	2006	Lily Allen	Alright, Still	Writing
"Shake It to the Ground" (Switch & Santogold remix)	2007	Blaqstarr	non-album singles	Remixing
"Lindsay Lohan's Revenge"	2007	Pase Rock	non-album singles	Featured artist, writing
"B-O-O-T-A-Y" (featuring Santogold)	2007	Spank Rock and Benny Blanco	Bangers & Cash	Featured artist, writing
"Outta My Head (Ay Ya Ya)"	2008	Ashlee Simpson	Bittersweet World	Writing
"Ragdoll"	2008	Ashlee Simpson	Bittersweet World	Writing
"Chasing Pirates" (Santigold and Snotty remix)	2010	Norah Jones	Chasing Pirates (Remix)	Remixing
"Running Out"	2010	Scissor Sisters	Night Work	Writing, backing vocals
"Exactly What You Run from You End Up Chasing"	2019	Tyler, the Creator	Igor	Backing vocals
"New Magic Wand"	2019	Tyler, the Creator	Igor	Backing vocals
"Puppet"	2019	Tyler, the Creator	Igor	Backing vocals
"Boyfriend"	2019	Tyler, the Creator	Igor	Backing vocals
"Blood, Sweat & Tears"	2019	Ava Max	Non-album single	Writing
"Why Won't The Sun Come Out?"	2024	Vince Staples	Dark Times	Spoken word

== Music videos ==
List of music videos, showing year released and directors
Title	Year	Director(s)
"Creator"	2008	Ace Norton
"L.E.S. Artistes"	2008	Nima Nourizadeh
"My Drive Thru"	2008	Marie Hyon & Marco Spier
"Lights Out"	2008	Kim Gehrig
"Big Mouth"	2012	Cody Critcheloe
"Disparate Youth"	2012	Sam Fleischner
"The Keepers"	2012	Santigold
"Girls"	2013	Weird Days
"Who Be Lovin' Me"	2015	Santigold and Trouble Andrew
"Chasing Shadows"	2016	Elliott Lester
"Can't Get Enough of Myself"	2016	Santigold and Sam Fleischner
"Banshee"	2016	Ari Marcopoulos
"High Priestess"	2022	Frank W. Ockenfels III
"Ain't Ready"	2022	Frank W. Ockenfels III
"Nothing"	2022	Frank W. Ockenfels III
"Shake"	2022	Frank W. Ockenfels III
"Fall First"	2022	n/c
"My Horror"	2023	n/c
