= Goldrush Tour =

2008–09 concert tour by Santogold

- Tour by Santogold
- Associated album: Santogold
- Start date: September 19, 2008
- End date: January 8, 2009
- Legs: 1
- No. of shows: 22

Santogold concert chronology
- Viva la Vida Tour (2008); The Goldrush Tour (2008); ...

The Goldrush Tour was a North American concert tour by Santogold, performed in support of her eponymous debut album. Sponsored by MySpace Music, it took place in September and October 2008.

The tour is the first that Santogold has headlined herself. She previously opened for M.I.A. on her KALA Back to P.O.W.A. Tour in 2007 and Coldplay on their Viva la Vida Tour in 2008. The tour spanned fifteen dates in the United States of America, with one in Canada. Santogold performed with both a live band and a DJ. Kanye West's DJ A-Trak will open for Santogold from September 23 to September 27, while Mates of State will support Santogold from September 28 to October 14. Low vs Diamond perform with Santi for a number of the dates, while Plastic Little, Trouble Andrew, and The Ting Tings made appearances. The tour went to Australia in January 2009.

Santogold also performs with the two backing dancers called SG-1s, who wear deadpan expressions and matching sunglasses. They occasionally provide backing vocals and synchronized dancing. Both girls are often in Santogold's music videos as well. One of the SG-1s is Moni-Jo, a musician, dancer and actress. The SG-1s however call themselves Agatha and Angus Gold.

== Critical reception ==
The Boston Globe said that Santogold "is built for theaters and maybe even arenas." Metro International agreed, saying "Santi White won't be opening for the likes of Coldplay again."

Santi was criticized for lipsyncing. Santogold does not always make use of her live band - one reviewer noted that "there is something mildly deflating about watching someone sing song after song backed not by actual people playing guitar, bass, and drums in the moment - right in front of us, right now - but rather the freeze-dried perfection of a digital recording of people playing guitar, bass and drums, somewhere else, a long time ago."

== Set list ==
- "You'll Find a Way"
- "L.E.S. Artistes"
- "Shove It"
- "Say Aha"
- "Lights Out" (Diplo's Panda Bear Remix)
- "Anne"
- "My Superman"
- "Guns of Brooklyn"
- "Icarus"
- "Starstruck"
- "Creator"

Encore

- "Get It Up"
- "Unstoppable"

== Tour dates ==
Date	City	Country	Venue
North America
September 19, 2008	New York City	United States	The Fillmore New York at Irving Plaza
September 20, 2008	Boston	United States	Paradise Rock Club
September 23, 2008	Philadelphia	United States	The TLA
September 24, 2008	Toronto	Canada	Phoenix Concert Theatre
September 25, 2008	Cleveland	United States	House of Blues
September 27, 2008	Detroit	United States	Saint Andrew's Hall
September 28, 2008	Chicago	United States	House of Blues
September 30, 2008	Lawrence	United States	Liberty Hall
October 1, 2008	Denver	United States	Gothic Theatre
October 4, 2008	Seattle	United States	The Showbox
October 5, 2008	Portland	United States	Crystal Ballroom
October 7, 2008	San Francisco	United States	The Fillmore
October 10, 2008	San Diego	United States	House of Blues
October 11, 2008	Las Vegas	United States	House of Blues
October 13, 2008	Anaheim	United States	House of Blues
October 14, 2008	Los Angeles	United States	Pellissier Building and Wiltern Theatre
Australia
December 31, 2008	Victoria	Australia	Falls Festival
January 1, 2009	Sydney	Australia	Field Day
January 3, 2009	Busselton	Australia	Southbound
January 5, 2009	Melbourne	Australia	Billboard The Venue
January 6, 2009	Sydney	Australia	The Forum
January 8, 2009	Brisbane	Australia	Sunset Sounds
