= Say Aha =

Single by Santigold

from the album Santogold
- Released: November 24, 2008
- Genre: New wave; reggae fusion
- Length: 3:35
- Label: Downtown Records (US); Atlantic Records (UK)
- Songwriters: Santi White; John Hill
- Producers: Santi White; John Hill; Switch (add.)

Santigold singles chronology
"Lights Out" (2008)	"Say Aha" (2008)	"Brooklyn Go Hard" (2008)

"Say Aha" is the fourth single by American artist Santigold, taken from her debut album Santogold.

== Release and reception ==
"Say Aha" was released on November 24 in the UK. The song appeared in television advertisements for Samsung. In the United States, a remix of "Say Aha" (as well as a remix of "L.E.S. Artistes") was featured in commercials for the Ford Flex.

NME said that the song "loses out considerably in the amazingness stakes simply by virtue of not being 'L.E.S. Artistes'. But [...] this is jaunty, dancehall-flecked and it's perfectly fine," giving the song an eight out of ten. A review from Music Week said the single "sounds sparkling" and "boasts a great chorus". Pitchfork Media described "Say Aha" as "perfect new wave bubblegum-- 2 Tone keyboards, phaser effects, a stomp-ready chorus, and a surf guitar solo to finish." The review said that the song "evoke[s] that moment when rock's aggression met reggae's drive and depth". The Times labelled the track "annoying/endearing" but "worthy of the hype."

== Music video ==
The music video for "Say Aha" was filmed on Red Hook, Brooklyn's Van Brunt Street on June 18, 2008. Santogold was photographed on the video set with her extras, riding on bicycles with lifesized loudspeakers.

== Track listing ==
UK CD single

1. Say Aha – 3:35

UK digital EP

1. Say Aha (Tom Neville's 24 Carat Vocal Remix) – 8:17 (7digital only)
2. Say Aha (Nevilles Gold Dust Dub) – 6:51
3. Say Aha (Phones Cosmic Dub) – 6:12
4. Say Aha (Tepr Edit) – 4:31

== Official versions and remixes ==
- Album Version – 3:35
- Nevilles Gold Dust Dub – 6:51
- Phones Cosmic Dub – 6:12
- Tepr Edit – 4:31
- Tom Neville's 24 Carat Vocal Remix – 8:17

== Chart positions ==
Chart (2008)	Peak position
Belgian Tip Chart (Flanders)	15
UK Singles Chart	157
