= My Drive Thru =

2008 single by Julian Casablancas, Santigold, and Pharrell Williams

Single by Julian Casablancas, Santigold (known as "Santogold" by then) and Pharrell Williams
- Released: June 2008
- Genre: Alternative rock; dance-punk; funk rock
- Length: 4:07
- Label: Converse
- Songwriters: Julian Casablancas; Santi White; Pharrell Williams
- Producer: The Neptunes

Julian Casablancas singles chronology
"My Drive Thru" (2008)	"11th Dimension" (2009)

Santigold singles chronology
"L.E.S. Artistes" (2008)	"My Drive Thru" (2008)	"Lights Out" (2008)

Pharrell singles chronology
"Zock On!" (2008)	"My Drive Thru" (2008)	"Universal Mind Control" (2008)

"My Drive Thru" is a collaborative single by The Strokes lead vocalist Julian Casablancas, American singer-songwriter Santigold (known as "Santogold" by then, she changed her alias in February 2009), and The Neptunes producer and N.E.R.D member Pharrell Williams. The song was created for Converse's centennial and was released in June 2008.

== Background ==
Various media outlets reported in May 2008 that Casablancas, Santigold (Santi White) and Williams had teamed up to create the song for Converse's centennial "Three Artists, One Song" campaign. White told Gigwise.com that Casablancas and White recorded "My Drive Thru" separately, "so it ends up being just this weird long song with sort of everybody with lots of their own personalities separate." Williams worked with Casablancas and White individually in Miami, New York City and Los Angeles. Santogold described the song as "such a Pharrell track." White continued that she wasn't worried about the song being for a brand. "It's like one of the main ways to get our music heard now, and so it's stupid for artists to shy away from that."

Williams, who appears on and produced the song, spoke of the collaboration:

I've always wanted to work with Julian and I'm a big fan of The Strokes. Santigold is super-talented and she cares about music so much that it's not just about sound, it's a visual aesthetic. Working together on original music that crossed all of our inspirations was completely refreshing and I love the track.

== Release and reception ==
"My Drive Thru" was made available as a free music download from the Converse website. The track received thousands of daily downloads, according to Converse.

The Times made "My Drive Thru" their track of the day, calling it "a three-headed Frankenstein monster of coolness" that was "a lovely attempt to allow guitar music, beats and R'n'B to come together in one happy bundle." Paste referred to the song as "a pulsating, guitar-driven grab bag of a dance track." Stereogum said the song was "a single-riffed blend that laces up elements of Pharrell, Santi & Julian's day jobs into a perfectly produced summertime pop cocktail." Gigwise.com was less positive, saying "the beat is repetitive, even a bit boring at times, but what saves it is the interaction of Santi White and Casablancas." Pitchfork Media felt that "the beat should get your shoes tapping, but it doesn't sound like an example of artists taking the corporate dollar to make something they couldn't profitably do on their own."

== Music video ==
A music video was created for a two-and-a-half-minute version of "My Drive Thru", directed by Psyop's Marie Hyon and Marco Spier. It builds on the campaign's paper doll chain theme, where people are connected by their Converse shoes. "The artists were filmed on a soundstage using three HD cameras and then animated using CGI. The production took about four months to complete as well as the use of nearly 10,000 paper cutouts of the artists." The video uses stop motion, and creates the illusion that Casablancas, White and Williams are all "unfolding" like paper dolls. The video clip debuted on MySpace and MTV on July 9, 2008. According to reports, it was one of the top ten shared videos in its first day of release, with over 750,000 streams. The music video was shortened into 30-second and 60-second cinema and television advertisements which debuted on July 14, 2008.

== Trivia ==
The Converse '3 Artist 1 Song' initiative has led to a series of other collaborations. In 2010, All Summer was released, written and produced by Vampire Weekend multi-instrumentalist Rostam Batmanglij, featuring Kid Cudi and Bethany Consentino of Best Coast. In 2012, "DoYaThing" was released, featuring Gorillaz, James Murphy of LCD Soundsystem and Andre 3000 of Outkast.

== In popular culture ==
"My Drive Thru" was featured in one episode of CSI: Miami
