= (RED)Wire =

Online magazine and music service by Bono and Bobby Shriver

- Website type: Online music and magazine service created on World AIDS Day
- Creators: Bono and Bobby Shriver
- Website: www.red.org
- Launched: December 1, 2006

(RED)Wire is an online magazine and music service created by Bono (of the Irish rock band U2) and Bobby Shriver. It is a part of the broader Product RED organization, which serves to work with corporations who are contracted to give a percentage of their profits for particular products to the Global Fund to fight HIV/AIDS in Africa. (RED)Wire was created on World AIDS Day on December 1, 2006. Each issue contains an exclusive song from a major artist and a "spotlight" song from an up-and-coming artist, as well as other non-music media, such as video clips, poems, and so on.

A full subscription costs the user $5 per month, half of which goes to the Global Fund and the other half going to the artists and producers involved, thus creating a sustainable business. Users can sign up to receive two free issues of the magazine. The magazine is currently only available for users in the United States and the United Kingdom.Currently (RED)Wire does not offer previous issues for purchase, but negotiations with the labels to be able to offer them are ongoing.

Issues of the magazine are retrieved and displayed by a custom Adobe Air application.

== Featured songs ==
issue	Exclusive track	Spotlight track
1	"Brooklyn (Go Hard)" by Jay-Z with Santogold	"Acid Tongue" (live) by Jenny Lewis
2	"I Believe in Father Christmas" by U2	"Joseph, Better You Than Me" by The Killers featuring Elton John and Neil Tennant
3	"Watching the Detectives" / "Walking on the Moon" by Elvis Costello and The Police	"Temporary People" by Joseph Arthur and the Lonely Astronauts

== List of contributing artists ==
- U2
- John Legend
- Elton John
- The Killers
- Elvis Costello
- R.E.M.
- Sheryl Crow
- Coldplay
- Bob Dylan
- Emmylou Harris
- Death Cab for Cutie
- Jenny Lewis
- Keith Urban
- Ziggy Marley
- Cat Power
- Faith Hill
- Jimmy Fallon
- Michael Franti
- Jay-Z
- Kylie Minogue
- Joseph Arthur and the Lonely Astronauts
- Neil Tennant
- The Dixie Chicks
- The Police
