= Chris Shar =

American drummer (born 1978)

Chris Shar (born Christopher Joshua Shar, November 14, 1978) is an American multi-instrumentalist and vocalist.

Shar was born and raised on the Jersey shore, predominantly in Toms River, New Jersey. Shar learned to play the drumkit at a young age, and played in a high school band. Shar lived in Philadelphia for a number of years where he joined the band Man Man. Shar is a former member of the bands Stiffed, Man Man (under pseudonym Sergei Sogay),Santigold, and most recently the drummer in Pours, an indie rock band from Burlington, Vermont. Shar lives in Burlington, Vermont. Shar has self-produced a number of songs over the years. Shar is diagnosed with muscular dystrophy.
