= Brooklyn Go Hard =

Promotional single by Jay-Z featuring Santigold

from the album Notorious (soundtrack)
- Released: December 1, 2008
- Recorded: 2008
- Genre: Hip hop
- Length: 4:02
- Label: Bad Boy; Fox Searchlight
- Songwriters: Shawn Carter; Kanye West; Santi White
- Producer: Kanye West

"Brooklyn Go Hard" is a song by American rapper Jay-Z, featuring guest vocals from American indie singer Santigold, released as a promotional single by Bad Boy Records/Fox Searchlight Pictures on December 1, 2008 for the Notorious B.I.G. biopic, Notorious. Serving as the film's theme song, both performers co-wrote the song with American rapper Kanye West, who produced it.

During the song's hook, a sample of Santigold's 2008 song "Shove It" is heard, although she herself contributes a separate performance to "Brooklyn Go Hard". It was initially downloadable exclusively through a subscription to (RED)Wire, with a portion of the profits going towards Bono's Product Red organization. Upon Jay-Z's acquisition of TIDAL, the song was released through the service. As of 2024, it remains unavailable on any other streaming platform.

Santigold first hinted at a collaboration in an interview with NME, stating that she "may also do something with Jay-Z, it's kind of secret – it's not for anything, it's just 'cause we want to." The use of a Kanye West-produced instrumental based around a female voice sample is reminiscent of Jay-Z and T.I.'s "Swagga Like Us", which was released months prior and sampled M.I.A.'s "Paper Planes".

In 2013, the song was used in television advertising for the Jackie Robinson biopic 42: The True Story of an American Legend.

== Remixes ==
The official remix to the song features alternate performances from Santigold, as well as rapper Foxy Brown and singer Wayne Wonder. Crooked I, Fabolous, Joell Ortiz, Royce da 5'9", Mos Def and Sauce Money have all released freestyles to the song, while Raekwon has released a loose remake, "Staten Go Hard".

== Charts ==
"Brooklyn Go Hard" initially peaked at number two on Billboard's Bubbling Under R&B/Hip-Hop Singles. The following week, it debuted on the Hot R&B/Hip-Hop Songs chart at number 62 and peaked at number 61 since then. "Brooklyn Go Hard" entered the Hot Rap Tracks chart at number 18.

Chart (2008)	Peak position
U.S. Billboard Hot R&B/Hip-Hop Songs	61
U.S. Billboard Hot Rap Tracks	18
