= With You. =

Dance music group

- Origin: London; New York City; Boston; Los Angeles
- Genres: House
- Years active: 2015–present
- Members: Switch; Daouda Leonard; Rick Trainor
- Website: wyfyby.com

With You. is a Los Angeles-based music group composed of Dave "Switch" Taylor, Rick Trainor and Daouda Leonard. The three members independently contributed to dance-music culture prior to their formation, with Taylor being a founding member of Major Lazer, Trainor producing and performing as a DJ, and Leonard having done A&R and production work with Skrillex, DJ Snake, DJ Mustard, and Brodinski. With You. has collaborated with numerous well-known musicians, including Vince Staples, Elan Atias and Spank Rock. The group has been featured inEntertainment Weekly, Complex, Stereogum, and Pitchfork, and they have been called a "supergroup" by XXL magazine. BBC Radio 1 and KISS-FM have also featured the group's music. The trio has performed alongside Gesaffelstein, Justice, Bob Moses and Lee Foss.

== Music ==
In June 2015, With You. released their first EP, Speak, which features a remix by rave group 2 Bad Mice. Two months later, in August 2015, the group released their first single entitled Ghost, featuring Vince Staples which included the song of the same name, its radio edit version, and an instrumental version. For the debut of "Ghost" Apple Music's Beats 1 Radio played the song every 30 minutes.

With You. also collaborated with vocalist Brittany Foster in 2015, and plan on releasing a mixtape in 2016.

With You. has described their musical influences as house, R&B, jazz, reggae, hip-hop and dancehall, which Taylor, Trainor and Daouda attribute to their diverse musical backgrounds.

In 2017, With You. contributed an almost-cover version of "The Power", titled "Give It All" featuring Santigold and Staples, for the film Power Rangers.

== Discography ==
Extended Plays

- 2015: Speak (feat. Elan Atias)

Singles

- 2015: "Ghost" (feat. Vince Staples)
- 2015: "Felt This" (feat. Brittany Foster)
- 2016: "Snaps" (from Bromance Records' Homieland Vol. 2 Compilation)
- 2017: "Give It All" (feat. Santigold and Vince Staples)

Remixes

- 2014: "Gully (With You. Remix" (with Spank Rock)
- 2015: "Discipline (With You. Remix)" by Club Cheval
- 2015: "Powerful (With You. & GITCHII Remix)" by Major Lazer featuring Ellie Goulding & Tarrus Riley
- 2015: "Be The One (With You. Remix)" by Dua Lipa
