= Power Rangers (film) =

2017 film by Dean Israelite

- Theatrical release poster
- Directed by: Dean Israelite
- Screenplay by: John Gatins
- Story by: Matt Sazama Burk Sharpless; Michele Mulroney; Kieran Mulroney
- Based on: Power Rangers by Haim Saban; Super Sentai by Toei Company Ltd.
- Produced by: Haim Saban; Brian Casentini; Marty Bowen; Wyck Godfrey
- Starring: Dacre Montgomery; Naomi Scott; RJ Cyler; Becky G; Ludi Lin; Bill Hader; Bryan Cranston; Elizabeth Banks
- Cinematography: Matthew J. Lloyd
- Edited by: Martin Bernfeld; Dody Dorn
- Music by: Brian Tyler
- Production companies: Lionsgate Films; Temple Hill Entertainment; SCG Films
- Distributed by: Lionsgate Films
- Release dates: March 22, 2017 (Regency Village Theater); March 24, 2017 (United States)
- Running time: 124 minutes
- Country: United States
- Language: English
- Budget: $100‒105 million
- Box office: $142.5 million

Power Rangers (or Saban's Power Rangers) is a 2017 American superhero film based on Saban Entertainment's Power Rangers franchise, itself based on the Japanese Super Sentai franchise. It is the third installment in the Power Rangers film series, and is a reboot that loosely adapts "Day of the Dumpster", the pilot episode of Mighty Morphin Power Rangers. The film was directed by Dean Israelite and written by John Gatins, and stars Dacre Montgomery, Naomi Scott, RJ Cyler, Becky G, Ludi Lin, Bill Hader, Bryan Cranston, and Elizabeth Banks. The film follows a group of teenagers who gain newfound powers, and must use them to protect Earth from an ancient reawakened threat. Franchise creator Haim Saban returned to produce the film under his investment firm.

Power Rangers premiered in Berlin, Germany on March 17, 2017, and was released in the United States a week later by Lionsgate Films. The film received mixed reviews from critics, and underperformed at the box office, with the total gross of $142.5 million worldwide against its budget of $100‒105 million. The film was intended to launch a film series with multiple sequels, but all plans were cancelled due to its commercial failure, leading Saban to sell the franchise rights to Hasbro. Another reboot was in development, but due to Hasbro ending its partnership with Netflix in 2024, plans for a reboot were scrapped. In 2025, Hasbro announced that another reboot was in development as a television series with Walt Disney Studios. Those plans were scrapped in 2026.

== Plot ==
In the Cenozoic era, a team of warriors known as the Power Rangers are tasked with protecting the Zeo Crystal and life on Earth. The Green Ranger, Rita Repulsa, betrays them, planning to use the Crystal's power to dominate the universe. The Red Ranger, Zordon, survives Rita's attack and hides five of the Power Coins. He then orders Alpha 5, his robotic assistant, to perform a meteor strike that kills him, the dinosaurs, and sends Rita to the bottom of the sea, foiling her scheme.

Sixty-five million years later in the town of Angel Grove, high school football star Jason Scott is kicked off the team and placed under house arrest after a prank gone wrong. In detention, he encounters nerd Billy Cranston and former cheerleader Kimberly Hart. Billy is placed in detention after experimenting with explosives while Kimberly is there for cyberbullying. After Jason defends Billy from a bully named Colt Wallace, who usually goes after the latter, Billy offers to deactivate Jason's ankle monitor for help at an old gold mine. Once there, Jason leaves to explore and runs into Kimberly. Billy detonates explosives to break some rock, attracting the attention of Jason, Kimberly, and nearby students Trini Kwan and Zack Taylor. The five discover the Power Coins and each take one. While escaping mine security, their car is hit by a train. The five find themselves at home Monday morning and discover that the coins have granted them superhuman abilities. Elsewhere, Rita's sleeping body is found, but upon waking, she goes on a rampage, accumulating gold to raise her minion Goldar and find the Crystal.

The five teenagers return to the mine, where they discover an ancient spaceship and meet Alpha 5 and Zordon's consciousness. They inform the teenagers about the Rangers' history and Rita, warning that they have less than two weeks until Rita has her full power, finds the Crystal, and uses it to destroy life on Earth.

The five spend the next week training against simulated Putties and trying to morph, to little success. To inspire the Rangers, Alpha reveals the Zords, a fleet of enormous assault vehicles modeled after dinosaurs. Zack takes his Zord out for a joyride and almost kills the group when he crashes it. This angers Jason, and they fight. While trying to separate the two, Billy morphs. However, when he becomes conscious of it, the armor disappears. Angered at their lack of progress, Zordon dismisses the group. Jason returns to the ship to confront him and discovers that once the Rangers morph, it will open the Morphing Grid and allow Zordon to restore himself to a physical body. Feeling betrayed, Jason accuses Zordon of forming the team for the sole purpose of escaping the Grid.

That night, Rita attacks Trini and orders her to bring the Rangers to the docks. There, the Rangers fight her but are quickly defeated. Rita forces Billy to reveal the location of the Crystal, which he figured out is under a Krispy Kreme, kills him, and releases the other Rangers. Taking Billy's body to the ship, the Rangers ask Zordon to resurrect him. Zordon says he cannot do so. The Rangers agree they would give their lives for each other and resolve to defeat Rita. In doing so, they unlock the Morphing Grid. Zordon revives Billy, sacrificing his chance to restore his own physical self. With the team restored and confident, the Rangers morph into their armor.

Rita creates Goldar, raises an army of Putties, and attacks Angel Grove to find the Crystal. The Rangers battle the Putties and head to Angel Grove in their Zords. After the Putties are destroyed, Goldar pushes the Rangers and their Zords into a fiery pit. There, the Zords combine and form the Megazord, a giant humanoid robot. Rita merges with Goldar; the Rangers battle and destroy Goldar. After refusing Jason's offer to surrender, Rita declares that more will come for the Crystal and leaps at the Megazord only to be slapped into space. The Rangers are praised as heroes and return to their normal lives while keeping their new powers.

In a mid-credits scene, the detention teacher announces that a student named Tommy Oliver will be joining them, and a green jacket is shown at an empty seat. (Note: In the source material, Tommy Oliver was a male, but the cast of the film and the actor who played Oliver in the source material expressed interest in a female version of the character in a sequel.)

== Cast ==
=== Power Rangers ===
- Dacre Montgomery as Jason Scott, the Red Ranger and leader of the team. Jason was Angel Grove High's star quarterback, until a failed prank led to a run-in with the law, followed by his removal from the AGHS football team.
- RJ Cyler as Billy Cranston, the Blue Ranger. He is autistic and a target of frequent harassment by fellow student Colt Wallace.
- Naomi Scott as Kimberly Hart, the Pink Ranger. A cheerleader at Angel Grove High, until being dropped from the squad for cyberbullying (she spread a private image of her friend around school).
- Becky G as Trini Kwan, the Yellow Ranger. A new girl in town, struggling to make friends, she has difficulty relating to her family. She also questions her own sexual orientation.
- Ludi Lin as Zack Taylor, the Black Ranger and second-in-command of the team. Zack's mother has been ill for some time, and his greatest fear is returning home one day to find her dead.

=== Allies ===
- Bill Hader as the voice of Alpha 5, the robot assistant to Zordon.
- Bryan Cranston as Zordon, the Power Rangers' mentor and the former Red Ranger. Zordon lived millions of years ago before his consciousness became a part of the Morphing Grid at the time of his death.

=== Villains ===
- Elizabeth Banks as Rita Repulsa, the former Green Ranger who went rogue and killed her old team before being subdued by Zordon for millions of years. She works to form the monster Goldar while attempting to steal the Zeo Crystal, an artifact that channels the Morphing Grid, a dimension that gives the Power Rangers their powers.
- Fred Tatasciore as the voice of Goldar, a gigantic winged monster made of gold.
  - Tatasciore also provides the vocal effects of the Putties who are depicted as stone golems that can be made from any Earth element.

=== Supporting ===
- David Denman as Sam Scott, Jason's father.
- Caroline Cave as Beverly Scott, Jason's mother.
- Anjali Jay as Maddy Hart, Kimberly's mother.
- Robert Moloney as Ted Hart, Kimberly's father.
- Patrick Sabongui as Mr. Kwan, Trini's father.
- Erica Cerra as June Kwan, Trini's obsessive mother.
- Kayden Magnuson as Pearl Scott, Jason's sister.
- Fiona Fu as Mrs. Taylor, Zack's mother.
- Morgan Taylor Campbell as Harper
- Sarah Grey as Amanda Clark
- Emily Maddison as Rebecca
- Wesley MacInnes as Colt Wallace, the school bully at Angel Grove High who targets Billy.
- Jaime Callica as Officer Bebe
- Matt Shively as Damo
- Garry Chalk as Captain Bowen.
- Fiona Vroom as Fenix Saleswoman and original alien Cenozoic Yellow Ranger
- Drew Ray Tanner as Young Lover
- Sophie Lui as Television Anchor
- Lisa Berry as Candace Cranston, Billy's mother.

Jason David Frank and Amy Jo Johnson, two of the cast members of the original TV series, make cameo appearances as Angel Grove citizens.

== Production ==
=== Development ===
Saban Capital Group and Lionsgate Films announced the film in May 2014, with Roberto Orci originally attached to produce. Ashley Miller and Zack Stentz were hired to write the film's script. When theirs was rejected, another script was proposed by Max Landis, which was also turned down as the studio wanted a grittier tone. Orci eventually left the project to work on Star Trek Beyond (2016). In April 2015, TheWrap reported that Dean Israelite was in negotiations to direct the film. Israelite told IGN in an interview that the film would be "completely playful, and it needs to be really fun and funny. But like Project Almanac, it's going to feel very grounded at the same time, and very contemporary and have a real edge to it, and a real gut to it, it's going to be a fun, joyful [movie] but one that feels completely grounded in a real world, with real characters going through real things". Brian Tyler was brought on to compose the film's music. Israelite has said that the film updates itself from the original series, being more character-driven and incorporating naturalism and a grounded nature.

=== Casting ===
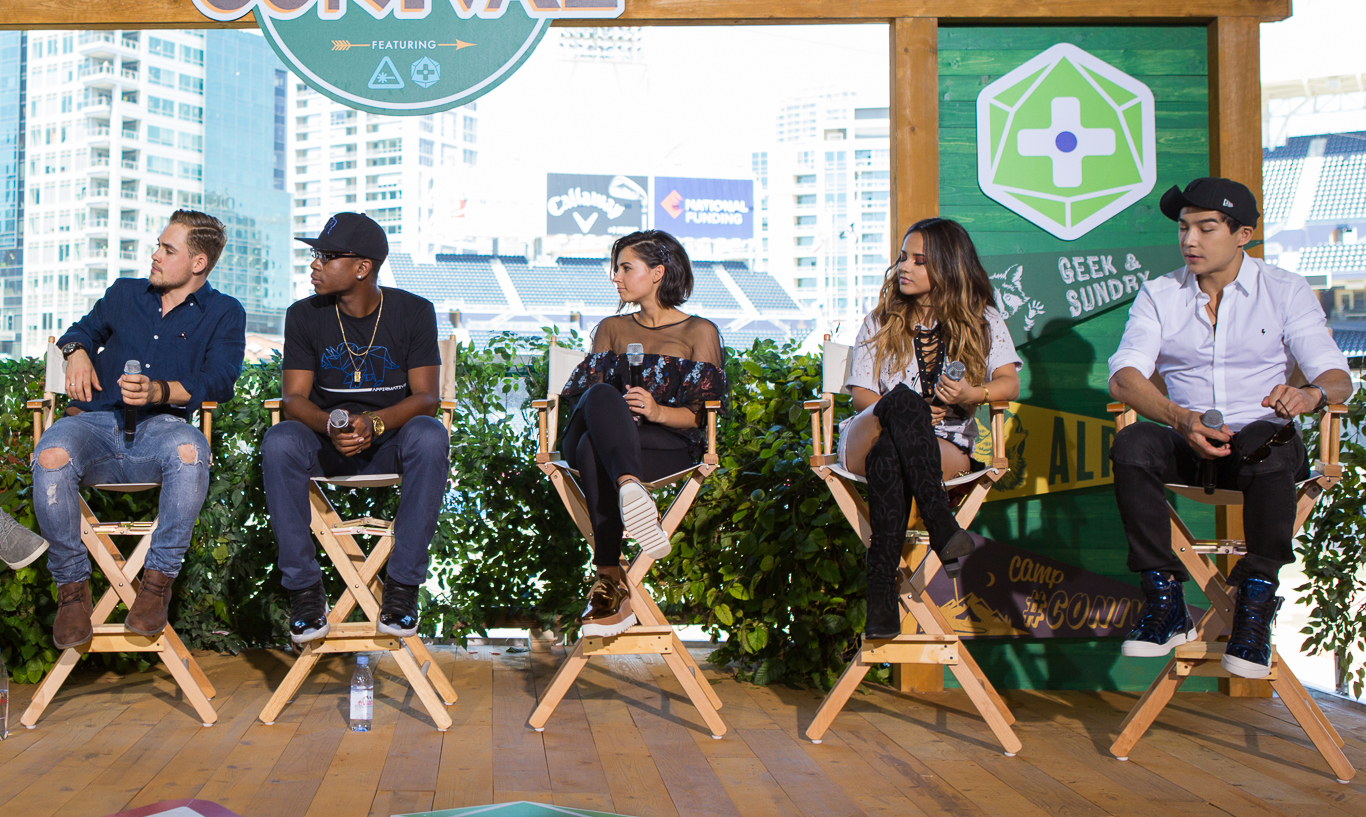
The main cast discussion offsite at Petco Park during San Diego Comic-Con 2016. From left: Dacre Montgomery, RJ Cyler, Naomi Scott, Becky G and Ludi Lin

Actors began testing for the roles of the five Power Rangers in October 2015. On October 7, 2015, Naomi Scott was cast as Kimberly. Newcomers Dacre Montgomery, Ludi Lin and RJ Cyler were then cast as Jason, Zack, and Billy, respectively. At the month's end, Becky G was chosen to play Trini. When it came to casting the Rangers, director Dean Israelite said, "From the very beginning, diversity was a very important part of the whole process," and that while the characters' races were switched around, he added that, "We made sure that the essence of each of those characters are who they were in the original show, and this really will be an origin story of those characters." On February 2, 2016, it was announced that Elizabeth Banks would portray Rita Repulsa. Four months later, Bryan Cranston, who voiced Twin Man and Snizzard in the original series, announced he was cast as Zordon. Cranston revealed that he would perform motion-capture and CGI. In September 2016, Walter Emanuel Jones, the actor who played Zack in the original series, stated none of the original cast would cameo in the film. Towards the end of the month, comedian Bill Hader was cast as Alpha 5. In March 2017, it was reported that Amy Jo Johnson and Jason David Frank, who played Kimberly and Tommy in the original series, would cameo in the film, despite Jones' earlier comments.

=== Filming ===
Filming was originally set to begin in January 2016 but was rescheduled and began on February 29 in Vancouver. On May 28, 2016, filming was complete. Additional filming occurred in October 2016. A cast member claims that the film has broken the record for the longest wire jump, but this has not been independently confirmed.

The film was released in Dolby Vision and Dolby Atmos sound.

== Music ==
The official soundtrack, with music by Brian Tyler, was released digitally on March 24, 2017, and on CD on April 4, distributed by Varèse Sarabande. The soundtrack features the "Power Rangers Theme," sung by renowned vocalist Dimash Qudaibergen, and "Give It All", a song by With You. featuring Santigold and Vince Staples, both of which played during the film's credits.

Power Rangers: Original Motion Picture Soundtrack

Soundtrack album by Brian Tyler
- Released: March 24, 2017
- Genre: Film score
- Length: 77:35
- Label: Varèse Sarabande

All music is composed by Brian Tyler.

Power Rangers: Original Motion Picture Soundtrack
No.	Title	Length
1.	"Power Rangers Theme"	4:22
2.	"Seek Those Who Are Worthy"	2:48
3.	"Zordon Awakes"	2:13
4.	"It's Morphing Time!"	3:19
5.	"Destiny"	2:18
6.	"Confessions"	4:22
7.	"Megazord (quotes "Go Go Power Rangers Theme" by Haim Saban and Shuki Levy)"	4:20
8.	"United"	2:46
9.	"Birth of a Legend"	4:10
10.	"Metamorphosis"	2:39
11.	"Goldar"	2:01
12.	"The Morphing Grid"	3:58
13.	"The Zords"	2:33
14.	"Let's Ride (quotes "Go Go Power Rangers Theme" by Saban and Levy)"	2:19
15.	"You Were Born for This"	2:03
16.	"Reflection"	2:13
17.	"The Lost Ship"	2:59
18.	"Be Who You Want to Be"	2:06
19.	"Hold The Line"	3:36
20.	"This Is What Matters"	2:04
21.	"Trespassing"	1:03
22.	"Rita"	2:28
23.	"Square One"	1:11
24.	"Power On"	2:33
25.	"Together We Stand"	2:19
26.	"The Final Stand"	2:45
27.	"Go Go Power Rangers – End Titles"	2:59
28.	"Give It All" (With You. featuring Santigold and Vince Staples)	3:14

== Release ==
=== Theatrical ===
Originally scheduled for release on July 22, 2016, Lionsgate delayed it to March 24, 2017. The film received its world premiere in Berlin, Germany on March 17, 2017. The then-five of the surviving actors who originally portrayed the Rangers in the series (Thuy Trang had died in 2001) attended the film's Los Angeles premiere on March 22, 2017. It was the first time they had been together publicly since 1995.

=== Marketing ===
On March 3, 2016, Lionsgate released the first official photo of the five Rangers, and the following month, the company released the first official photo of Banks as Rita Repulsa. On May 5, the company unveiled the first official images of the Rangers' suits. Director Dean Israelite said that "The show was about kids coming of age, about metamorphosis, these suits needed to feel like they were catalyzed by these kids and their energy, their spirit", while production designer Andrew Menzies commented that the new suits are "an alien costume that grows on them, that's not man-made. You can't win everyone over, but we are trying to appeal to a more mature audience and gain new fans." A teaser poster was released in June, with additional character posters released in July, September, and October. On October 8, 2016, a Discover The Power teaser trailer for the film was released.

A fictional Angel Grove High School Newspaper website was created, alongside the official Power Rangers website, which features a GIF creator that allows users to make a GIF out of scenes from the teaser trailer. There is also an official toyline, produced by Bandai, and an extensive merchandising range was produced to promote the film.

Landis, whose draft was rejected, criticized the trailer, saying that it looked too similar to Chronicle (2012), a film that he had written. The trailer garnered mixed reactions, with some praising it for its darker, contemporary reimagining of the classic characters, while still looking action-packed and fun at the same time, and others criticizing it for its lack of connection to the original series, saying it appeared "brooding". The trailer received over 150 million views in the first two days after it was uploaded. Lionsgate revealed the T-Rex Zord toy, among others, on October 28, 2016, and the Power Rangers Twitter account revealed the Megazord toy on November 4, 2016. On November 15, 2016, Lionsgate revealed the toys based on the film's individual Zords.

On December 8, 2016, a new poster debuted, as well as a photo of Rita Repulsa. On December 19, 2016, Lionsgate and Boom! Studios announced that they would release a graphic novel titled Power Rangers: Aftershock, set immediately after the events of the movie. An international trailer was released on December 22, 2016. Qualcomm and Lionsgate produced a virtual reality mobile app of the film Power Rangers Movie Command Center that was exhibited at the CES 2017, from January 5–8, 2017, and was released in the App Store on March 8, 2017. On January 19, a second trailer, titled It's Morphin Time!, was released. Lionsgate debuted yet another trailer, which it called the All-Star Trailer, on February 17. New TV spots were released on February 27, two about the Power Rangers, and one about Rita Repulsa. A clip was released on March 6, followed by two more on March 9. Thirty-seven stills were then released. Another TV spot was released on March 10. In the final week before the movie premiered, two more clips, as well as photos, were released.

A Build-A-Bear Workshop Power Ranger product range was announced on March 9, 2017. Krispy Kreme released doughnuts to promote the film, and served as an advertising partner. Placement of Krispy Kreme products and locations were featured in the film numerous times.

The group collaborated with YouTube sports entertainment group Dude Perfect ahead of the film's release, in a video titled Dude Perfect vs. Power Rangers.

=== Home media ===
Power Rangers was released on Digital HD on June 13, 2017, and was followed by a release on DVD, Blu-ray, and Ultra HD Blu-ray on June 27, 2017 with retail exclusive variants being made available at Best Buy, Target and Wal-Mart. The film debuted at the No. 1 spot on the NPD VideoScan overall disc sales chart which tracks combined DVD and Blu-ray Disc sales; NPD's dedicated Blu-ray Disc sales chart; and Home Media Magazine's video rental chart for the week ending July 2, 2017. The film retained the top spot on the NPD VideoScan's overall disc sales chart for the week ending on July 9, 2017.

== Reception ==
=== Box office ===
Power Rangers grossed $85.4 million in the United States and Canada, and $57 million in other territories, for a worldwide gross of $142.3 million, against a production budget of $100–105 million. The film lost the studio an estimated $74 million, when factoring in all revenues and expenses.

In the United States and Canada, Power Rangers opened alongside Life, CHiPs and Wilson, and was projected to gross $30–35 million from 3,693 theaters on its opening weekend. The film made $3.6 million from Thursday night previews and $15 million on its first day. It went on to debut to $40.3 million, finishing second at the box office behind Beauty and the Beast ($90.4 million). The audience was notably diverse and mostly 18–34 years old. In its second weekend the film grossed $14.5 million (a drop of 64%), finishing fourth at the box office. In June 2017, Dean Israelite said that the film's PG-13 rating probably contributed to the film's underperformance at the box office.

=== Critical response ===
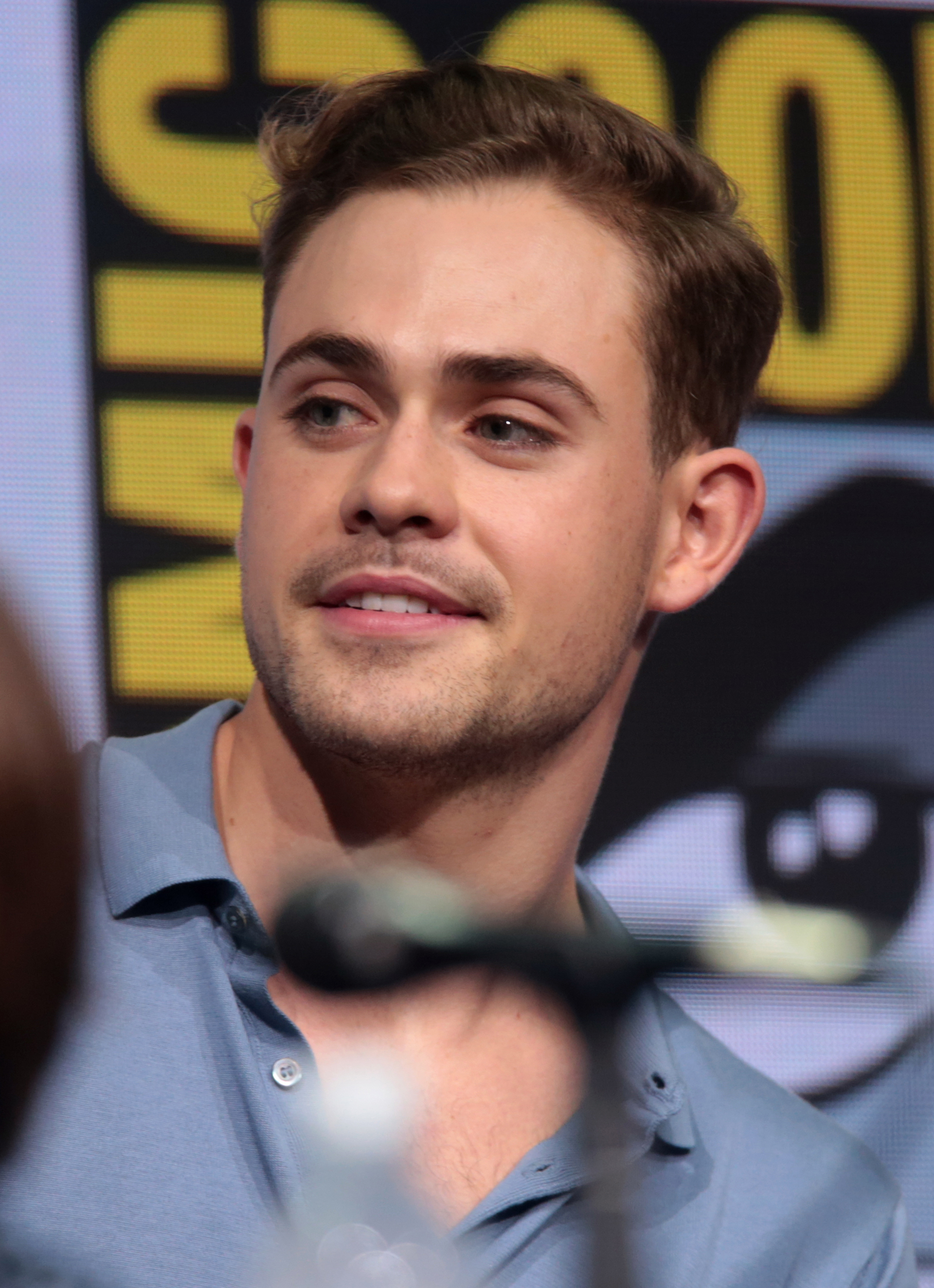
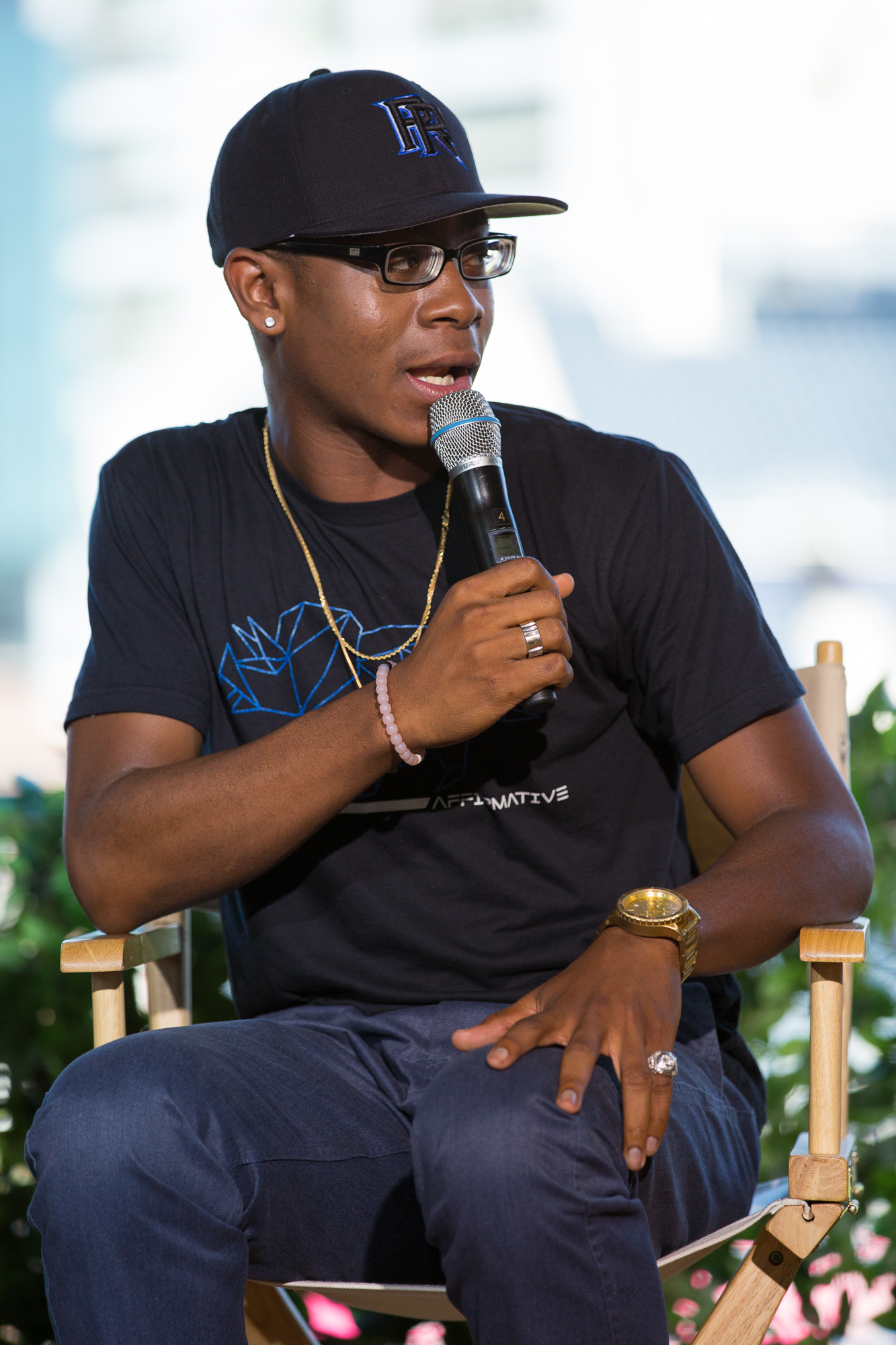
Dacre Montgomery and RJ Cyler were praised for their performances.

Power Rangers received mixed reviews from critics. On review aggregator website Rotten Tomatoes, the film has an approval rating of 51% based on 179 reviews, and an average rating of 5.3/10. The site's critical consensus reads, "Power Rangers has neither the campy fun of its TV predecessor nor the blockbuster action of its cinematic superhero competitors, and sadly never quite manages to shift into turbo for some good old-fashioned morphin time." On Metacritic, the film has a weighted average score 44 out of 100, based on 30 critics, indicating "mixed or average reviews". Audiences polled by CinemaScore gave the film an average grade of "A" on an A+ to F scale, while PostTrak reported 66% of audience members gave the film a "definite recommend".

IGN gave the film a 7 out of 10, saying, "Power Rangers doesn't quite pull off everything it wants to, but it's a fun time at the theater nonetheless." Mike McCahill of The Guardian wrote that "the film achieves a functioning mediocrity we perhaps might have thought beyond this franchise," and gave it 2 out of 5 stars.

Mike Ryan of Uproxx gave the film a negative review, writing: "Power Rangers has one of the most zig-zagged tones of any big budget studio film I've seen in a long time. It's jarring at times how often it goes back and forth between 'gritty' and 'silly'." In a 2.5 out of 5 review, Bill Goodykoontz of The Arizona Republic stated that "at its best, Power Rangers plays a little like a low-rent Breakfast Club. Unfortunately, it's not always at its best, and when it's not, you get exactly what you'd expect: generic teen hero fare." Owen Gleiberman of Variety criticized the film's conflicting tones, saying: "...25 years ago, Mighty Morphin Power Rangers was launched as superhero fodder for kids, and there was indeed a place for it, but we're now so awash in superhero culture that kids no longer need the safe, lame, pandering junior-league version of it. They can just watch Ant-Man or the PG-13 Suicide Squad. Safe, lame, and pandering have all grown up." In a review for The Telegraph, Robbie Collin gave it one star out of five, criticizing the "abjectly embarrassing frenzy of product placement".

=== Accolades ===
The film was nominated in six categories at the 2017 Teen Choice Awards, the film for Choice Sci-Fi Movie, Dacre Montgomery for Choice Sci-Fi Movie Actor, Becky G and Naomi Scott for Choice Sci-Fi Movie Actress, RJ Cyler for Choice Scene Stealer, and Elizabeth Banks for Choice Movie Villain.

== Franchise ==
=== Cancelled sequels ===
In a May 2016 conference call to analysts regarding future films, Lionsgate CEO Jon Feltheimer stated: "We could see doing five or six or seven." On March 22, 2017, Haim Saban said that he and Lionsgate already had a six-film story arc. In May 2017, Forbes noted that, due to the underwhelming performance of the film in most markets, it was unlikely any sequels would be made. Later that same month, it was reported that the sequels could still be made, thanks to record-breaking merchandise sales. Prior to the home release of the movie, Israelite confirmed that talks were taking place regarding a sequel, and that he would like to include Lord Zedd and Tommy Oliver (Green Ranger) in it. The possibility of a sequel increased once more, in early July 2017, when it was reported that the film held the number-one spot in home media sales and rentals within its first week. In August 2017, Saban abandoned its trademark for the film's logo. A Saban Brands representative stated in October 2017 that "Power Rangers continues to own and renew hundreds of trademark registrations worldwide, including for the 2017 movie logo. The trademark registration process is very nuanced, and the status of the single application has no bearing on our ownership of or the future plans for Power Rangers. The franchise remains as strong and enthusiastic about its future as ever." On May 1, 2018, Saban Brands agreed to sell Power Rangers and other entertainment assets to Hasbro for US$522 million, in cash and stock, with the sale expected to close in the second quarter.

On August 8, 2018, Hasbro announced they would be working with a film studio to develop a follow-up to Power Rangers. In February 2019, Hasbro CEO Brian Goldner announced, during a financial call, that Hasbro was in-talks with Paramount Pictures to produce the sequel.

=== Cancelled reboot and future ===
On July 11, 2019, in the AMA thread on the Stranger Things subreddit, Dacre Montgomery revealed that the studio had plans to produce a second reboot, albeit without himself nor the rest of the cast, as well as the director being replaced. On December 13, 2019, it was reported that Jonathan Entwistle was in early negotiations to direct the reboot, with Patrick Burleigh being set to write the script. The plot would reportedly involve time travel and would primarily be set in the 1990s. On October 20, 2020, it was announced that Entwistle would work on the reboot with Hasbro, as he would be overseeing and directing both film and television adaptations. The next week, Deadline reported that Bryan Edward Hill would write the script for the reboot; however, in 2024, these plans were scrapped.

In December 2024, it was reported that the film had been moved to Paramount Pictures. In 2025, Hasbro announced that another reboot was in development as a television series with Disney+. Those plans were scrapped in 2026.

== Video game ==
Lionsgate and Saban, in collaboration with nWay Games, released a PvP fighting mobile game called Power Rangers: Legacy Wars on March 24, 2017, to coincide with the film's release. The game was featured on both Android and the Apple Store and got to the top spot on the Apple App Store for both iPhones and iPads, for two consecutive days and number two on the Google Play Store.
