= Top Ranking: A Diplo Dub =

2008 mixtape by Santigold & Diplo

Top Ranking

Mixtape by Santigold and Diplo
- Released: July 15, 2008
- Genre: Hip hop; dub; electronic; post-punk; reggae; psychedelic; mash-up
- Label: Mad Decent
- Producer: Diplo; Santi White

Santigold chronology
Santogold (2008)	Top Ranking (2008)	Master of My Make-Believe (2012)

Diplo chronology
FabricLive.24 (2005)	Top Ranking: A Diplo Dub (2008)	Decent Work for Decent Pay (2009)

Top Ranking: A Diplo Dub is the first mixtape by American musician and singer Santigold (then going by Santogold) and Philadelphia-based DJ Diplo, released on July 15, 2008.

== Background ==
Top Ranking features remixes of songs from Santogold's debut album, as well as remixes of other artists. Santogold also has previously unreleased songs on the mixtape, including a cover of the Clash's "The Guns of Brixton", with lyrics altered to refer to Brooklyn. "Guns of Brooklyn" and "Get It Up", a collaboration with M.I.A. that heavily samples Gorilla Zoe's "Hood Nigga" and drumming by Northern Cree, were leaked to the blogosphere prior to the mixtape's release. An alternate version of "Get It Up" featuring Esau Mwamwaya rather than Gorilla Zoe also appeared on the internet. The album was released for a short period of time on the internet as a free download.

The Diplo remix of "I'm a Lady", which features Amanda Blank, was later included in its entirety on Blank's 2009 album I Love You.

After taking inspiration from a Siouxsie and the Banshees song for her track "My Superman" on her debut album, Santogold sampled for this mixtape another song from their album Kaleidoscope, "Lunar Camel", on the track "Find a Way (Grame & Switch Mix)".

== Critical reception ==
Professional ratings
Review scores
Source	Rating
Exclaim!	(positive)
NME	(8/10)
Rolling Stone	4/5 stars
Pitchfork Media	(8.0/10.0)
Slant Magazine	3.5/5 stars

The mixtape has received comparisons to M.I.A. and Diplo's 2004 mixtape, Piracy Funds Terrorism. However, Pitchfork Media stated that "the similarities between this collaboration and Diplo's first-- 2004's M.I.A.-trumpeting Piracy Funds Terrorism mix-- are as superficial as those between M.I.A. and Santogold themselves." According to NME, Top Ranking "expands on her [Santogold's] debut's cultural crossover", incorporating "hyphy, crunk, classic dub and new wave". The review continued that the mixtape "is a must-have" either "as a standalone mixtape or a perfect companion to Santogold". Exclaim! said that Top Ranking "showcases Santogold's steeze and flexibility as an MC/singer." They praised Diplo's "global and eclectic" production, calling Top Ranking "a top-notch mixtape that will hopefully find its way up from the underground." Idolator labelled the disc "an entertaining listen, with most of the disparate influences that influence Santogold's debut appearing in one form or another." Slant Magazine said that "Top Ranking's hotness can't—and shouldn't—be downplayed", but also that it doesn't distinguish itself from Piracy Funds Terrorism and that "Santogold's unique essence feels lost amid the clutter."

Top Ranking was named one of 2008's five best mixtapes by The Guardian. The publication also named the Diplo Remix of "I'm a Lady" featuring Amanda Blank one of the "singles" of the year.

== Track listing ==
1. "Dub Selection Intro"
2. Three 6 Mafia – "Late Night" (Unstoppable Mix)
3. Santogold – "Shuv It" (Disco D Blend)
4. Santogold – "I'm a Lady" (Diplo Mix feat. Amanda Blank)
5. Sir Mix-a-Lot – "Posse on Broadway"
6. Santogold – "Lights Out" (Diplo's Panda Bear Mix)
7. Aretha Franklin – "Save Me"
8. Devo – "Be Stiff"
9. The B-52's – "Mesopotamia"
10. Gerri and the Holograms – "Gerri and the Holograms"
11. Santogold – "Anne" (Switch Mix)
12. Santogold – "L.E.S. Artistes" (XXXchange Mix feat. Mavado)
13. Cutty Ranks – "Dutty Six Pack"
14. Santogold – "Find a Way" (Grame & Switch Mix feat. Kid Cudi) / "Lunar Camel"
15. Richie Spice & Ratatat – "Marijuana"
16. Desmond Dekker – "Shanty Town"
17. Santogold – "Guns of Brooklyn"
18. The Dixie Cups – "Iko Iko"
19. Tony Matterhorn – "Big Belly Guns"
20. Santogold – "Get It Up" (Radioclit Mix feat. M.I.A., Gorilla Zoe, and Northern Cree)
21. Mark Ronson in Studio
22. Trouble Andrew – "Run - Hide"
23. Sister Nancy – "Pigeon Rock"
24. Nora Dean – "Barbwire"
25. Shinehead – "Know How Fe Chat"
26. The Clash – "Ghetto Defendant"
27. Skream & Warrior Queen – "Check It"
28. Santogold & Benga – "Unstoppable" / "Night Dub"
29. Shawty Lo & Skream – "Dey Know" / "Stagger"
30. Santogold – "Creator" (Mumdance Mix feat. Jammer, Badness, Chronik Rage, Slikman and Tempz)
31. Xray – "Turbulence Dubplate" (Starstruck Diplo Mix)
32. Barrington Levy – "Send a Moses"
33. Prince Jazzbo – "Ital Corner"
34. Santogold – "Icarus"
35. Santogold & Diplo – "Right Brigade"

== Covers and samples ==
- Near the end of "Dub Selection Intro" is a sound byte from Street Fighter II
- "Late Night" (Unstoppable Mix) by Three 6 Mafia samples Santogold's "Unstoppable"
- Amanda Blank's verse in "I'm a Lady" (Diplo Mix) samples LL Cool J's "I Need Love"
- The end of "Shuv It" (Disco D Blend) samples Shinehead's "Billie Jean"
- Diplo's Panda Bear Mix of "Lights Out" samples "Comfy in Nautica" by Panda Bear and "What's a Girl to Do?" by Bat for Lashes
- "Anne" (Switch Mix) samples "Das Model" and "Nummern" by Kraftwerk
- "Dutty Six Pack" opens with a sample from the Clash's "Lightning Strikes (Not Once but Twice)" from Sandinista! and further samples "Six Pack" by Black Flag
- "Find a Way" (Grame & Switch Mix) / "Lunar Camel" samples "Lunar Camel" by Siouxsie and the Banshees
- "Guns of Brooklyn" is a cover of the Clash's "The Guns of Brixton" and samples "Dub be good to me" from Beats International
- "Iko Iko" by the Dixie Cups is blended with "Ching-a-Ling" by Missy Elliott and samples Clinic's "The Equaliser" from Walking with Thee
- "Big Belly Guns" opens with the intro to "Sonic Reducer" by the Dead Boys and the drums from Dead Kennedys's "California Uber Alles", closing with its bassline and guitar riff and Street Fighter sound effects
- "Get It Up" (Radioclit Mix feat. M.I.A. and Gorilla Zoe) samples Tony Matterhorn's "Big Belly Guns" and Gorilla Zoe's "Hood Nigga", and it also contains a sound byte from Street Fighter II
- "Creator" contains a part of "Crank That (Soulja Boy)" by Soulja Boy Tell 'Em, and "Freaky Gurl" by Gucci Mane
- "Turbulence Duplate" (Starstruck Diplo Mix) by Xray samples Santogold's "Starstruck"
- The instrumental of "Icarus" is based around "This Is How We Walk on the Moon" by Arthur Russell
- "Right Brigade" is a cover of Bad Brains
