= I Don't Want: The Gold Fire Sessions =

Mixtape by Santigold
- Released: July 27, 2018
- Recorded: 2018
- Genre: Dancehall
- Length: 32:46
- Label: Downtown
- Producer: Dre Skull; Ricky Blaze; Diplo; King Henry

Santigold chronology
99¢ (2016)	I Don't Want: The Gold Fire Sessions (2018)	Spirituals (2022)

Singles from I Don't Want: The Gold Fire Sessions
- 1. "Run the Road" Released: July 26, 2018

I Don't Want: The Gold Fire Sessions is the second mixtape by American musician and singer Santigold, released on July 27, 2018, through Downtown Records.

== Release and recording ==
On July 26, 2018, Santigold announced she would be releasing a surprise dancehall album in the style of a mixtape, and shared "Run the Road" as the first single, which premiered on Zane Low's Beats 1 show on Apple Music. The album was recorded in sessions that lasted over two weeks with Dre Skull, in which they crafted new songs from unfinished ones they had found, including ones Santigold had previously worked on with producers, Diplo and Ricky Blaze. She explained, "we went into the studio and we spent one week where he just made beats and I came in and did melodies, and then did another week where I came in and wrote and recorded everything. It was really fast. There was another chunk after that, but then there was a big break where I found out I was having twins. I had them, and then life got crazy. I recorded the last vocals when I was literally 9 months pregnant." The two stated that they were "playing with reggae and Afro-Caribbean influences while pushing and pulling their pillars with Santi's singular point of view." Santigold expressed her wish to continue this "spontaneous and quick" approach for future projects, explaining: "I think I'm going to keep doing that for a while, rather than focusing on big, whole projects. I don't think people necessarily digest music in the same way. So I'm going to do fun stuff for a minute, a different way. I have another EP I'm about to do with someone else that's going to be really fun and fast."

Originally released only as a digital download, a physical version was released as a yellow and black multi-color vinyl LP for Record Store Day on April 13, 2019.

== Composition ==
I Don't Want: The Gold Fire Sessions is primarily influenced by dancehall, reggae, traditional and contemporary African pop, and Afro-Caribbean music. Paper magazine called the album "musically borderless, fiercely energizing, and as aggressively catchy as it is political." The ten songs of the album feature syncopation and "keyboard bubbles", with each song cross-fading into the next one.

Santigold described the album as "a summer reggae record", and stated that the album was inspired by the dancehall musicians she grew up listening to while visiting Jamaica, a place she considers to be "like a second home" to her. She further elaborated on the sound of the album: "There's dancehall, and then there's reggae. And there's overlap but there's a totally different sound of reggae which is like roots reggae and all kind of stuff that's not dancehall, because it's more like old school reggae, and there's so much. There's a lot of African influences on this album, African music has influenced me a lot in my life as well. So those are, I would say the three pillars of this record." Santigold explained that the majority of the songs were driven by social commentary rather than by the current political climate.

== Critical reception ==
Professional ratings
Aggregate scores
Source	Rating
Metacritic	77/100
Review scores
Source	Rating
Highsnobiety	4/5
MusicOMH	4/5 stars
The Observer	3/5 stars
Pitchfork	7.4/10

Pitchfork writer Karas Lamb stated that the album "combines Santigold's musical past with a passion for spontaneous experimentation. It plays like a distillation of joy. "Crashing Your Party," "A Perfect Life," and the titular closing track dip into the sonic territory of Blondie, bhangra, and afrobeats to suggest that Santigold created The Gold Fire Sessions much like she created herself: without borders or rules or walls." The New York Times critic Jon Pareles wrote that "Santigold's charm, pop instincts and steely sense of purpose can all be found" on the album. Ben Devlin of MusicOMH said that "the dubby sound effects placed throughout as track transitions give the impression of a relatively low stakes mixtape. This is no bad thing though, as the creative synthesis between her and producer Dre Skull means there isn't a dull moment on the record. I Don't Want: The Gold Fire Sessions is a gem, an energetic and hook-filled album that leaves the listener wanting more."

In her review for The Observer, Kitty Empire wrote, "Without disrespecting Santigold's previous output, however, it feels as though I Don't Want might be a case of the right set at the right time. The Gold Fire Sessions takes advantage of the spontaneity afforded by rapidly music consumption, by catching another dancehall wave at the precise moment it crests." Highsnobiety's Cameron Cook called the album "a milestone for dancehall music," and concluded his review writing: "I Don't Want seems like the culmination of so many facets of Santi's persona: genre-hopping pop music, tropical melodies, the African diaspora, no-nonsense attitude. In a way, it would be somewhat affirming to see her career take on new life within the tight-knit dancehall community, but more likely, this album will serve as an important marker in her discography, a moment when everything she stands for came together to make something truly special, a milestone in the dancehall movement that tested the genre's boundaries and won."

== Track listing ==
I Don't Want: The Gold Fire Sessions track listing
No.	Title	Writer(s)	Producer(s)	Length
1.	"Coo Coo Coo"	Santi White; Andrew Hershey	Dre Skull	3:29
2.	"Run the Road"	White; Hershey; Ricardo Johnson	Skull; Ricky Blaze	4:22
3.	"Wha' You Feel Like"	White; Hershey	Skull	2:37
4.	"I Don't Want"	White; Hershey	Skull	3:49
5.	"Valley of the Dolls"	White; Hershey; Pablo Elias Zukowski; Henry Agincourt Allen; Thomas Wesley Pentz	Skull; King Henry; Diplo	4:16
6.	"Why Me"	White; Hershey	Skull	2:26
7.	"Crashing Your Party"	White; Hershey; Johnson	Skull; Blaze	2:44
8.	"Don't Blame Me" (featuring Shenseea)	White; Hershey	Skull	2:20
9.	"A Perfect Life"	White; Hershey	Skull	2:47
10.	"Gold Fire"	White; Hershey	Skull	3:51
Total length:				32:46

== Charts ==
Chart performance for I Don't Want: The Gold Fire Sessions
Chart (2018)	Peak position
Belgian Albums (Ultratop Flanders)	159
Belgian Albums (Ultratop Wallonia)	180
US Independent Albums (Billboard)	21
US Reggae Albums (Billboard)	1
