= 99¢ (Santigold album) =

Studio album by Santigold
- Released: February 26, 2016
- Recorded: 2015
- Studios: Patrik's House (Stockholm); Ulvhälls Herrgård (Strängnäs); Chateau Marouatte (Grand-Brassac); Logwell Udio (New York); Atlantic (New York); Eldorado (Los Angeles); Rodeo (Santa Monica); House of Hit (Los Angeles); Downtown (New York); Jungle City (New York); Atlantic (Los Angeles); Echo Park Backhouse (Los Angeles); The Village (Los Angeles); Federal Prism (Los Angeles); Paulie Sound Factory (Los Angeles)
- Genres: Indie pop; dancehall; new wave
- Length: 45:22
- Label: Atlantic
- Producers: Santigold; John Hill; Patrik Berger; Rostam Batmanglij; Style of Eye; Martin Stilling; Ian Longwell; Justin Raisen; HazeBanga; Stint; Zeds Dead; Dave Sitek; Noah Breakfast; Nugget; Hit-Boy; Veryrvre; Mike of Uzi

Santigold chronology
Master of My Make-Believe (2012)	99¢ (2016)	I Don't Want: The Gold Fire Sessions (2018)

Singles from 99¢
- 1. "Can't Get Enough of Myself" Released: November 4, 2015; 2. "Who Be Lovin' Me" Released: November 25, 2015; 3. "Chasing Shadows" Released: January 14, 2016; 4. "Banshee" Released: February 11, 2016

99¢ is the third studio album by American musician and singer Santigold, released on February 26, 2016, on Atlantic Records.

== Release ==
On November 4, 2015, Santigold announced the release of her third studio album 99¢, originally scheduled for release on January 22, 2016. The announcement was accompanied by the release of the lead single, "Can't Get Enough of Myself", which premiered on Zane Lowe's Beats 1 show. On November 25, Santigold shared "Who Be Lovin' Me" alongside a music video. On December 16, it was announced that the release date of the album was delayed to February 26. On January 14, "Chasing Shadows" was released as the third single after premiering on Annie Mac's BBC Radio 1 show, with a music video being released the following day. The fourth and final single, "Banshee", was released on February 11.

== Critical reception ==
Professional ratings
Aggregate scores
Source	Rating
Metacritic	71/100
Review scores
Source	Rating
AllMusic	4/5 stars
Drowned in Sound	8/10
Exclaim!	6/10
The Guardian	3/5 stars
Mojo	4/5 stars
Paste	8.2/10
Pitchfork	6.8/10
Rolling Stone	3.5/5 stars
Slant Magazine	3/5 stars
Uncut	3.5/5 stars

At Metacritic, which assigns a normalized rating out of 100 to reviews from mainstream critics, the album received an average score of 71, based on 26 reviews, which indicates "generally favorable reviews". Stephen F. Kearse of Paste wrote, "Although the bulk of the album oscillates between sarcasm and sincerity, the most fully realized songs transcend that spectrum entirely." Drowned in Sound's Lee Adcock gave the album a favorable review, stating, "99¢ doesn't exactly deliver the discussion on commodity and the self promised on the cover, but Santigold have assembled a fine package, one which showcases White and her undeniable swagger."

Ryan McNutt of Exclaim! was more critical of the album, stating, "99¢ is an album buoyed by its sonic playfulness, but which fails to shake its playlist sensibility--entertaining, engaging but only occasionally leaving a lasting impression." Jonathan Wroble of Slant Magazine also criticized the album, stating, "More often than hitting a sweet spot in between, the songs here are overly busy (like "Big Boss") or short on ideas (the by-the-numbers "Before the Fire" and the psych-rock "Outside the War"), and the album's title turns into an unfortunate allusion to a warehouse stocked to the brim with cheap toys, none built to last."

== Track listing ==
No.	Title	Writer(s)	Producer(s)	Length
1.	"Can't Get Enough of Myself" (featuring BC Unidos)	Santi White; Patrik Berger; Markus Krunegård	Berger; Santigold; John Hill^{[b]}	3:57
2.	"Big Boss Big Time Business"	White; Rashad Muhammad; Rostam Batmanglij	Haze Benga; Hit-Boy^{[b]}; Batmanglij^{[b]}	3:35
3.	"Banshee"	White; Berger; Cathy Dennis; Sarah Hudson; Hill	Hill; Berger; Style of Eye^{[b]}	3:45
4.	"Chasing Shadows"	White; Batmanglij	Batmanglij	3:15
5.	"Walking in a Circle"	White; Hill; Nick Zinner; Noah Lev Beresin; Ajay Bhattacharyya	Hill; Stint; Noah Breakfast^{[a]}	3:56
6.	"Who Be Lovin Me" (featuring ILoveMakonnen)	White; Makonnen Sheran; Dylan Mamid; Zach Rapp-Rovan	Zeds Dead	3:52
7.	"Rendezvous Girl"	White; Berger; Martin Stilling	Stilling; Berger	4:22
8.	"Before the Fire"	White; David Andrew Sitek; Sam Dew	Sitek	3:03
9.	"All I Got"	White; Berger	Berger; Santigold; Hill^{[b]}	2:56
10.	"Outside the War"	White; Ian Longwell; Martin "Doc" McKinney; Tashfiq Patwary; Jeffrey Washington; Christoper Basham; Batmanglij	Longwell; Santigold; VERYRVRE^{[b]}	4:30
11.	"Run the Races"	White; Longwell; Mike Rezai; Batmanglij; Lev Beresin	Longwell; Santigold; Batmanglij^{[a]}; Mike Of Uzi^{[b]}; Breakfast^{[b]}	4:23
12.	"Who I Thought You Were"	White; Justin L. Raisen; Jeremiah Raisen	Raisen; Nugget^{[b]}	3:48
Total length:				45:22

Notes

- ^{^[a]} signifies a co-producer
- ^{^[b]} signifies an additional producer

== Personnel ==
Credits adapted from the liner notes of 99¢.

Musicians

- Santigold – vocals, guitar (track 12), synthesizer (track 10), instruments (tracks 1, 9)
- B.C. – featured artist (track 1)
- ILoveMakonnen – featured artist (track 6)
- John Hill – guitar (tracks 3, 5), keyboards (tracks 3), synthesizer (tracks 5), instruments (tracks 1, 3, 9)
- Patrik Berger – instruments (tracks 1, 3, 7, 9)
- Martin Perna – flute (track 1), baritone saxophone (track 1), tenor saxophone (track 1)
- Jordan McLean – trumpet (track 1), flugelhorn (track 1)
- Rostam Batmanglij – keyboards (track 10), synthesizer (track 12)
- Mikey Hart – guitar (track 3), keyboards (track 3)
- Linus "Style of Eye" Eklow – instruments (track 3)
- Martin Stilling – instruments (track 7)
- James King – tenor Saxophone (track 3), baritone Saxophone (track 3)
- Fabio Santana – trombone (track 3)
- Todd Simon – trumpet (track 3)
- Noah Lev Beresin – synthesizer (track 5)
- Ian Longwell – drums (track 10), synthesizer (track 10)
- Doc McKinney – guitar (track 10)
- Nick Zinner – guitar (tracks 10, 11), synthesizer (track 10)
- Sam Spiegel – synthesizer (track 10)
- Justin L. Raisen – bass (track 12), guitar (track 12), synthesizer (track 12)
- Bosh Rothman – drums (track 12)
- Alexandra Shungudzo – backing vocals (track 3)
- Amanda Warner – backing vocals (track 3)
- Cathy Dennis – backing vocals (track 3)
- Charli XCX – backing vocals (track 3)
- Noonie Bao – backing vocals (track 3)
- Sarah Hudson – backing vocals (track 3)
- Angel Deradoorian – backing vocals (track 4)
- Sam Dew – backing vocals (track 8)

Production

- Santigold – executive production, production (tracks 1, 9–11)
- John Hill – production (tracks 3, 5), additional production (tracks 1, 9)
- Patrik Berger – production (tracks 1, 3, 7, 9)
- Rostam Batmanglij – production (track 4), co-production (track 11), additional production (track 2)
- Linus "Style of Eye" Eklow – additional production (track 3)
- Martin Stilling – production (track 7)
- Ian Longwell – production (tracks 10, 11)
- Justin L. Raisen – production (track 12)
- HazeBanga – production (track 2)
- Stint – production (track 5)
- Zeds Dead – production (track 6)
- David Andrew Sitek – production (track 8)
- Noah Breakfast – co-production (track 5), additional production (track 11)
- Nugget – additional production (track 12)
- Hit-Boy – additional production (track 2)
- VERYRVRE – additional production (track 10)
- Mike of Uzi – additional production (track 11)

Technical

- Santigold – programming (tracks 1, 9)
- John Hill – programming (tracks 3, 5)
- Patrik Berger – programming (tracks 1, 3, 7, 9)
- Rostam Batmanglij – programming (track 12), mixing (track 4)
- Linus "Style of Eye" Eklow – programming (track 3)
- Nugget – programming (track 12)
- Martin Stilling – programming (track 7)
- Ajay Bhattacharya – programming (track 5)
- Ian Longwell – engineering (tracks 10, 11)
- Justin L. Raisen – programming (track 12), additional mixing (track 12)
- Barbara Klaskin Silberg – choir directing (track 4)
- Nick Rowe – editing (track 12)
- Brendan Morawski – engineering (all tracks), additional mixing (tracks 2, 6, 8)
- Ryan Gilligan – engineering (tracks 1, 3, 5, 9)
- Dan Fyfe – engineering (tracks 2, 6, 7, 9)
- Mark Rankin – engineering (track 3)
- Rob Cohen – engineering (track 3)
- Jimmy Gonzalez – engineering (tracks 4, 5)
- John DeBold – engineering (track 4)
- Zeph Sowers – engineering (track 8)
- Nicolas Fournier – engineering assistance
- Martin Cooke – engineering assistance
- Danny Goliger – engineering assistance (tracks 1, 3, 5, 9)
- Ebonie Smith – engineering assistance (tracks 1, 6, 11)
- Josh Wilson – engineering assistance (tracks 1, 3, 7, 9)
- Will van Boldrik – engineering assistance (tracks 1, 3, 5, 9)
- Miles Comaskey – mix engineering assistance (track 3)
- Rich Costey – mixing (tracks 1, 2, 5–12), additional mixing (track 4)
- Tony Maserati – mixing (track 3)
- Mario Borgatta – mixing assistance
- Claudio Cueni – additional mixing (track 8)
- Chris Gehringer – mastering

West Los Angeles Children's Choir (track 4)

- Dino Barranco
- Jack Thompson
- Jair Miles
- Mason Lee
- Matthew Goodman
- Michael Yang
- Misha Reiss
- Spencer Lee
- Taaryn Cooper
- Theo King

Artwork

- Santigold – art direction, design
- Matt Meiners – art direction, design
- Mark Jacobs – art direction, creative direction
- Photographer Hal – cover art
- Avena Gallagher – styling
- April Roomet – personal stylist
- Devra Kinnery – makeup
- YUSEF – hair
- Ron Bellair – hair assistant

== Charts ==
Chart performance for 99¢
Chart (2016)	Peak position
Australian Albums (ARIA)	64
Belgian Albums (Ultratop Flanders)	67
Belgian Albums (Ultratop Wallonia)	178
Canadian Albums (Billboard)	71
French Albums (SNEP)	165
Irish Albums (IRMA)	90
Swiss Albums (Schweizer Hitparade)	51
US Billboard 200	55
US Top Alternative Albums (Billboard)	6
US Top Rock Albums (Billboard)	8
