= Spirituals (Santigold album) =

Studio album by Santigold
- Released: September 9, 2022
- Recorded: 2020 – April 2021
- Genres: Pop; electronica; tropicalia; gospel; punk; rap; funk; post-punk; reggae
- Length: 30:37
- Label: Little Jerk Records (worldwide)
- Producers: Boys Noize; Doc McKinney; Dre Skull; Heavy Mellow; Jack Hallenbeck; Lido; Illangelo; P2J; Psymun; Ray Brady; Ricard Pernord; Ricky Blaze; Rostam Batmanglij; Ryan Olson; Santigold; SBTRKT

Santigold chronology
I Don't Want: The Gold Fire Sessions (2018)	Spirituals (2022)

Singles from Spirituals
- 1. "High Priestess" Released: May 18, 2022; 2. "Ain't Ready" Released: June 15, 2022; 3. "Nothing" Released: July 13, 2022; 4. "Shake" Released: August 10, 2022; 5. "Fall First" Released: September 21, 2022; 6. "My Horror" Released: November 18, 2022; 7. "Witness" Released: January 11, 2023

Spirituals is the fourth studio album by American musician and singer Santigold. It was released digitally and physically on vinyl on September 9, 2022, through Little Jerk Records. The CD was out on September, 30.

The lyrics address human resilience. Santigold promoted Spirituals with singles and videos for "High Priestess", "Ain't Ready", "Nothing", "Shake", "Fall First", "My Horror" and "Witness".

The album received favorable reviews.

== Background ==
Santigold had released the I Don't Want: The Gold Fire Sessions mixtape in July 2018 and she had additionally appeared on two Tyler, the Creator releases, Music Inspired by Illumination & Dr. Seuss' The Grinch in late 2018 and Igor in mid 2019, contributing vocals. Spirituals was recorded largely throughout the COVID-19 pandemic, between 2020 and 2021 with lyrics inspired in part by the present time in the US. The album was a nod to the traditional Negro spirituals.

She stated: "I called it "Spirituals" because, for me, making this record was my own salvation, really. It was an opportunity to step out of survival mode. And the idea of using art and music in particular to transcend my circumstances and experience freedom and joy and beauty in the absence of it in my environment to me was the same thing that Negro spirituals did for slaves in a time where [sic] they were able to experience freedom and joy through this music when their - in their environments, they were not free, and there wasn't - it wasn't joyous."

Santigold explained that the writing process was cathartic. It was "creating light for me to move towards"; "I'm so lucky to know that creating, just the act of creating, can do that for me, can save me that way, can lift me up." She described Spirituals as a "celebration of human resilience."

In mid-April 2021, Santigold shared a picture of her final days in the studio to social media. In June 2021, Santigold featured on Mark Ronson's The Fader Uncovered podcast. She confirmed details of her upcoming album, which was being mixed at the time, sharing the title and stating:

There's a lot of beats. I definitely made it in a room by myself, virtually with everyone, which was hard... I ended up being in Canada for five months in a cabin in the woods really by myself, which was interesting because then the whole nature thing really opened up and became another element that found its way into the music... It's just all over the place... It's got some punk. It's got some rap. It's got everything.

== Music ==
Spirituals incorporates pop beats, electronica, tropicalia, gospel, punk, rap, funk, post-punk, and reggae.

Rolling Stone wrote that on Spirituals opener "My Horror", "she combines subtle electronica with flashes of ukulele". "High Priestess" was described as s a "powerful slice of glitchy rap pop, pitted against fierce lyrical wordplay". Heather Phares described it as "a deceptively sweet lullaby of stasis that unleashes its dread slowly". Alternative Press wrote about the songs: "She shares her journey to ascension and invites us to participate with tropical rhythms that simultaneously haunt and uplift". NME wrote that Santigold opened to love on the closing track "Fall First", saying: "her passion is channelled through an unlikely vintage post-punk lens, complete with a motorik beat, an ominous bassline and cavernous reverb".

== Release ==
The album was released worldwide on CD. A picture disc edition vinyl LP - limited to 7,500 copies- was also made available from various retailers including Amazon, "Roughtrade", Juno, "Imusic", and Fnac.

Short music videos were shot and uploaded on Santigold's YouTube channel for the six singles taken from the album: "High Priestess", "Ain't Ready", "Nothing", "Shake", "Fall First" and "My Horror".

The lead single, "High Priestess", was released in May 2022, later followed by "Ain't Ready", alongside the album's announcement, and "Nothing". Spirituals was released via Little Jerk Records label.

== Critical reception ==
Professional ratings
Aggregate scores
Source	Rating
Metacritic	78/100
Review scores
Source	Rating
AllMusic	4/5 stars
And It Don't Stop	A−
Clash Music	7/10
Glide Magazine	8/10
The Guardian	4/5 stars
musicOMH	4/5 stars
NME	4/5 stars
Paste	7.3/10
The Skinny	4/5 stars
Pitchfork	7.4/10 stars
The Telegraph	4/5 stars

Spirituals was met with mostly positive reviews. At Metacritic, which assigns a normalized rating out of 100 to reviews from mainstream critics, the album received an average score of 78, based on 14 reviews.

NME rated it 4 out of 5 stars, saying that "fearless sonic pioneer leads the pack once again", and The Telegraph published a glowing review, praising the diversity of the styles, rating it 8 out of 10. The Guardian rated it 4 out of 5 stars, sayining it was "a heartfelt lockdown journey through loneliness, triumph and rage". Pitchfork reviewer Heven Haile considered that Santigold "is pioneering an innovative soundscape" on Spirituals with "unsettlingly ethereal vocals", concluding that she "reimagines the type of music that can comfort people in times of grief and stagnation". Another writer of the NME praised in particular the song "Fall First", saying: "Santi's signature yelp fits like a glove over this sonic mixture". Heather Phares of AllMusic noted in general "hypnotic" songs "with ear-catching production choices aplenty" and how "Santigold also excels at bridging the past, present, and future of her own music". Reviewer Robert Christgau hailed Spirituals as Santigold's best album yet, crediting her with "transmuting the atmospheric midtempo rock-as-electrodance she's long fiddled with so engagingly into something more ominous, almost as if she's observant enough to notice that she's living in history".

== Track listing ==
Spirituals track listing
No.	Title	Writer(s)	Producer(s)	Length
1.	"My Horror"	Santi White; Naeem Juwan; Martin "Doc" McKinney; Alexander Ridha; Rostam Batmanglij	McKinney; Boys Noize; Santigold; Batmanglij	2:36
2.	"Nothing"	White; Ray Brady; McKinney; Carlo Montagnese; Andrew Hershey	Santigold; McKinney; Illangelo; Dre Skull	2:49
3.	"High Priestess"	White; Brady; Ridha; Peder Losnegård; Ryan Olson; Simon E. Christensen	Santigold; Boys Noize; Brady; Psymun; Olson	3:13
4.	"Ushers of the New World"	Santigold; Ricardo Lloyd Johnson Jr.; Batmanglij; Christensen; Jack Hallenbeck	Ricky Blaze; Batmanglij; Santigold; Hallenbeck	3:28
5.	"Witness"	White; Losnegård; Everett Romano	Lido; Heavy Mellow	2:35
6.	"Shake"	White; Aaron Jerome Foulds	SBTRKT	1:41
7.	"The Lasty"	White; Aku Orraca-Tetteh; Alexander Shuckburgh; Christensen; Jacob Brian Dutton	Psymun; Santigold	2:41
8.	"No Paradise"	White; Orraca-Tetteh; Nick Zinner; Hershey; Richard Isong	P2J; Dre Skull; Santigold	3:59
9.	"Ain't Ready"	White; Montagnese; Hershey; Foulds	Santigold; Illangelo; Dre Skull; SBTRKT	3:26
10.	"Fall First"	White; Batmanglij	McKinney; Ricard Pernord; Santigold	4:09
Total length:				30:37

== Personnel ==
- Joe LaPorta – mastering
- Alex Tumay – mixing (tracks 1–5, 7, 10)
- Andrew Kim – mixing (1–5, 7, 10)
- Julian Picado – mixing (1–5, 7, 10)
- Mike BLoom – mixing (1–5, 7, 10)
- Noah Goldstein – mixing (6, 8, 9)
- Chris Kasych – recording
