= Lights Out (Santigold song) =

Single by Santigold

from the album Santogold
- Released: August 11, 2008
- Genre: Indie rock; new wave
- Length: 3:12
- Label: Downtown Records; Lizard King; Atlantic
- Songwriters: Santi White; John Hill; Chris Feinstein
- Producers: Santi White; John Hill

Santigold singles chronology
"L.E.S. Artistes" (2008)	"Lights Out" (2008)	"Say Aha" (2008)

"Lights Out" is a song by American musician Santigold (then Santogold). It was released on August 11, 2008, through Downtown, Lizard King and Atlantic Records as the third single from her debut studio album, Santogold (2008).

== Release and reception ==
On July 4, 2008, "Light Out" was announced to be released on August 11 as the third single from Santogold. The song, as well as an exclusive remix, was used to promote Bud Light Lime, with the remix being available as a free download from the brand's official website. Santi promoted the song on BBC Radio 1's popular Live Lounge programme, hosted by Jo Whiley. She performed "Lights Out" and a cover of Adele's "Hometown Glory". Lights Out also appeared in hit TV show Grey's Anatomy.

Rolling Stone compared "Lights Out" to "a lost Pretenders single." NME, meanwhile, said the song "harkens back to the sleek ’80s new wave of The Cars." Blender seconded the comparison, saying the "butterfly fragile" song uses "chunky Cars guitars and a plaintive early-MTV synth" as a "shy come-on". "Lights Out" also received comparisons to Pixies; The List said that the "uplifting indie rock number 'Lights Out' – the track most generously endowed with those hooks White speaks so proudly of – recalls The Pixies." The Village Voice stated it "channel[s] the Pixies [sic] with a punk-pop sound fueled by spare guitar plucks, simple drum patterns, and lyrics delivered in a talk-sing stutter with random falsetto breaks." It "finds a fascinating middle ground between the Pixies and the Go-Go's", according to Pitchfork. Pitchfork placed it at #422 on its "Top 500 Tracks of the 2000s" list. PopMatters simply called the song "a sweet and eerie lullaby". ILikeMusic said that "under a pure fire pop chorus the track is as irresistible as gravity." The Manchester Evening News went as far to call the song "perfect, faultless: a complete peach."

== Music video ==
The "Lights Out" music video was directed by Kim Gehrig. The music video premiered via Pitchfork on August 11, 2008. It features Santigold performing in front of various colored walls and patterns — zebra print, black-and-yellow gingham, a tropical theme, cheetah and tiger prints, flamingoes, feathers, and others.

== In popular culture ==
- The song is featured in Nirvana the Band the Show in the Web Series during Episode 9 - The Band
- The song is in the soundtrack for the movie Bellflower

== Track listing ==
- UK CD single
1. "Lights Out" (radio edit) – 3:13
- UK digital EP
1. Lights Out – 3:13
2. Lights Out (Tepr Club Remix) – 5:40
3. Lights Out (Tepr Emo Remix) – 3:37
4. Lights Out (Kid Gloves Remix) – 7:30
5. Lights Out (Dave Rubato Remix) – 3:16 (iTunes only)

== Official versions and remixes ==
- Album Version — 3:12
- Radio Edit — 3:13 (same as the album version)
- Video Version — 2:30
- Bud Light Remix — 2:32
- Dave Rubato Remix — 3:16
- Diplo's Panda Bear Remix — 2:22 (appears on Top Ranking)
- Kid Gloves Remix — 7:30
- Tepr Club Remix — 5:40
- Tepr Emo Remix — 3:37
