= Creator (song) =

Single by Santogold featuring Switch & Freq Nasty

from the album Santogold
- A-side: "L.E.S. Artistes"
- Released: January 22, 2008
- Genre: Electronic; hip hop; dub
- Length: 4:17 (original); 3:33 (album version)
- Label: Downtown Records (US); Atlantic Records (UK)
- Songwriters: Daryn McFayden; Santi White; David Taylor
- Producers: Freq Nasty; Switch

Santogold featuring Switch & Freq Nasty singles chronology
"Creator" (2008)	"L.E.S. Artistes" (2008)

"Creator" is the debut single by American artist Santogold (now Santigold), and along with "L.E.S. Artistes", the first to be taken from her then self-titled debut Santogold. It is written by Daryn McFayden, Santi White and David Taylor. The song features Santi singjaying.

== Release and reception ==
"Creator" was released as a limited edition 12" vinyl in late 2007 and January 2008, with "L.E.S. Artistes" as a double A-sided single. It was later released on the US iTunes Store on March 25, 2008. The song featured in an advert for Alberto Vo5 hair products in the UK throughout spring 2008 and summer 2009. It has also been played in the Bud Light: Lime advert, which premiered in May 2008. The song was also featured in an episode of Grey's Anatomy, Chuck (Season 4, Episode 9) and the final episode of Entourage season 4. Additionally, the song was featured on the July 1st, 2009 episode of So You Think You Can Dance. The song is also featured on the video game FaceBreaker, NBA 2K9, NBA 2K15 and NBA 2K17.

In September 2008, it featured in an episode of Gossip Girl as Blair Waldorf walks in on Nate and her boyfriend's mom making out. Alex Denney of Drowned in Sound called the song's introduction "an audacious way of introducing yourself to the world; with one of the most irritating vocals ever committed to tape." Denney goes on to say that "Creator" sounds "like giant robots crushing epic landscapes underfoot, a thuddingly neo-tribal and achingly, even clownishly modern floor." At the end of the review, the "Creator/L.E.S. Artistes" EP was rated seven out of ten. Todd Martens of the Los Angeles Times described the song as "an urban safari of warped electronic noises."

== Music video ==
Director Ace Norton shot a video for "Creator" in the beginning of 2008; however, it did not get released since the single was changed to "L.E.S. Artistes". Santi explained that they had "shot a video for Creator and it was bad. The director didn't get the shots that we needed. ...And the video was not good enough for this song. ...I was like, we're not gonna use it. And they were like, we just spent all this money. So we changed the single to LES, and had a video, and people loved it, and it worked."

== Track listing ==
- 12" vinyl:

(DWT70032; January 22, 2008 (US); February 24, 2008 (UK))

1. Creator – 3:32
2. L.E.S. Artistes – 3:43
- U.S. Digital download:

(March 25, 2008)

1. Creator – 3:32
2. L.E.S. Artistes – 3:43

== Official versions and remixes ==
- Original Version — 4:17
- Album Version — 3:33
- Instrumental — 3:20
- Mumdance Mix feat. Jammer, Badness, Chronik Rage, Slikman & Tempz — 3:32 (appears on Top Ranking)
- Scottie B Remix — 4:12

== Release history ==
Region	Date
United States	January 22, 2008
United Kingdom	February 24, 2008

== Charts ==
"Creator" spent two nonconsecutive weeks in March 2008 at number forty-four on Billboard's Hot Singles Sales chart, before falling to number forty-nine.

Chart (2008)	Peak
U.S. Billboard Hot Singles Sales	44
