= Stiffed (band) =

American punk rock band (2001–2006)

- Origin: Philadelphia, Pennsylvania
- Genres: Ska punk, punk rock, alternative rock, indie rock, new wave, no wave
- Years active: 2001–2006
- Labels: Darryl Jenifer, Lizard King
- Past members: Santi White (later known as Santogold, and then again as Santigold); Matt Schleck (guitarist); Chris Shar (bassist); Chuck Treece (drummer)

Stiffed was an American punk rock band from Philadelphia, Pennsylvania.

They incorporated both New Wave and No Wave elements into their work. Founded by vocalist Santi White also known as Santigold, the original band lineup also included guitarist Matt Schleck, bassist Chris Shar and drummer Chuck Treece. The band's "stripped-raw rhythm and eerie vocals [...] created so much buzz in the underground rock scenes in New York and Philadelphia that record producer Ryko and publicity hotshots Girlie Action (the White Stripes and Ryan Adams are also clients) approached the band hoping to distribute and represent Stiffed's music." Their initial EP Sex Sells was released in 2003 on Coolhunter records, and their debut album Burned Again, produced by Darryl Jenifer of Bad Brains, was released in 2005. The band helped launch White's solo career under the stage name Santigold.
