= Santogold (album) =

Album by Santigold

Studio album by Santigold
- Released: April 29, 2008
- Recorded: 2007
- Studio: Schoolhouse (New York); Pitch Black (Brooklyn)
- Genre: New wave; electro; indie rock; pop; reggae; dub; grime
- Length: 41:19
- Label: Downtown; Lizard King; Atlantic
- Producer: Santigold; John Hill; Switch; Disco D; Diplo; Freq Nasty; Jonnie "Most" Davis

Santigold chronology
Santogold (2008)	Top Ranking: A Diplo Dub (2008)

Singles from Santogold
- 1. "Creator" Released: February 24, 2008; 2. "L.E.S. Artistes" Released: May 5, 2008; 3. "Lights Out" Released: August 11, 2008; 4. "Say Aha" Released: November 24, 2008

Santogold (Note: Titled Santigold in some streaming services and post-2009 re-releases.) is the debut studio album by musician and singer Santigold (who performed as Santogold at the time of the album's release). It was released on April 29, 2008, in the United States through Downtown Records and on May 12 in the United Kingdom through Lizard King and Atlantic Records. The album was recorded within eight weeks in New York City at Schoolhouse and Pitch Black Studios. It was written and produced primarily by Santigold and former Stiffed bandmate John Hill, alongside contributions from other producers, including Diplo, Switch and Disco D, and vocal appearances from Spank Rock and Trouble Andrew.

This album incorporates a variety of musical styles, such as new wave, punk, electro, reggae and dub, with the aim of defying boundaries and genre classification. This genre-defying approach awarded the album with praise from music critics. It earned multiple spots on music publications' year-end lists of the best albums of the year, as well as on several decade-end lists. The record charted in the United States, United Kingdom, Ireland, Netherlands, France and Belgium, and spawned the singles "Creator", "L.E.S. Artistes", "Lights Out", and "Say Aha".

== Recording, music and development ==
Santogold was written and recorded in the span of eight weeks. When working on the album, Santigold aimed to defy boundaries and genre classifications, and the expectations from a black woman to sing R&B. She says she was "able to work with all these genres that are typically sub-cultural, like dub or punk or something, and then, by writing in a way that had hooks, made it accessible to everyone." Despite the album also being released on Lizard King Records, Santigold had left the label prior to the release of the album, saying that they "didn't allow me any freedoms. The label was a joke and I'll say that on the record. They weren't involved at all and pretty much got in the way." By the time the album was finished, she signed to Atlantic Records, who she says loved the album and asked her to not change anything on it. The track "My Superman" was inspired by the 1980 song "Red Light" by Siouxsie and the Banshees, and contains an interpolation of it: the song credits of the song were subsequently attributed half to Siouxsie Sioux and Steven Severin on the American Ascap website.

Jon Pareles of the NY Times noted that there was also a "reggae-ska side" in songs like "Say Aha" and "Shove It".

== Critical reception ==
Professional ratings
Aggregate scores
Source	Rating
Metacritic	77/100
Review scores
Source	Rating
AllMusic	4.5/5 stars
The A.V. Club	A−
Entertainment Weekly	A−
The Guardian	4/5 stars
The Independent	4/5 stars
MSN Music (Consumer Guide)	A−
NME	8/10
Pitchfork	7.1/10
Rolling Stone	4/5 stars
Spin	4/5 stars

Santogold received acclaim from music critics. At Metacritic, which assigns a normalized rating out of 100 to reviews from mainstream publications, the album received an average score of 77, based on 27 reviews. The album was noted for its eclectic sound and blend of various musical genres, including new wave, electro, indie rock, dub, post-punk, reggae, grime, ska, and hip hop, and was positively compared to various acts, such as M.I.A., Pixies, Blondie, Siouxsie and the Banshees, Grace Jones, Debbie Harry, Goldfrapp, The Go-Go's, Joe Strummer, and the Slits. Will Hermes of Rolling Stone called it "a visionary album" and "one of the year's most unique debuts", and stated that despite being influenced by other acts, Santigold "ultimately sounds like her own damn movement." Writing for NME, Priya Elan felt the album "reveals a glittery crazy-paved path towards a brave new musical future", and commended it for stylistically veering from one track to another while still remaining a cohesive body of work.

AllMusic critic Marisa Brown called Santogold an album "that looks outward at the pan-continental landscape while staying firmly adherent to and respectful of its deeply American roots; this is the emerging—and hopeful—face of the new millennium, and an altogether shining accomplishment." The Village Voice wrote, "With her eponymous debut's deft mix of dap, punk, rock, pop, house, reggae, and hip-hop, she won't completely live down associations with the famous Sri Lankan (whom she also counts as a friend), but the result emerges as much more than a mere imitation."

=== Accolades ===
Santogold was ranked among the best albums of 2008 by numerous publications. Billboard named it the second best album of 2008, while Rolling Stone, Spin, and New York all listed the album at number 6 on their year-end lists. Pazz & Jop ranked it at number 7 on their annual list. NME also ranked it at number 7, while Slant Magazine placed it at number 9. Other publications who featured Santogold on their year-end lists include Q, The Guardian, Pitchfork, Consequence of Sound, Paste, PopMatters, Drowned in Sound, Gigwise, Mixmag, musicOMH and Blender.

The album was also included in lists ranking the best albums of the 2000s (decade). Complex ranked it at number 26 on their list, as well as at number 24 on their "100 Best Albums of the Complex Decade" list, which includes albums released from 2002 to 2012. Slant Magazine placed the album at number 35 on their "Top 100 Albums of the 2000s" list, while Kitsap Sun and Les Inrockuptibles ranked it at number 66 and 76, respectively. In their "50 Essential Albums" list, which includes albums from 2004 to 2014, Clash ranked Santogold at number 41.

== Commercial performance ==
As of 2012, Santogold had sold 225,000 copies and 932,000 individual downloads in the United States according to Nielsen SoundScan. In 2009 the album was certified silver by the BPI. In 2010 it was awarded a gold certification from the Independent Music Companies Association, which indicates 100,000 sales across Europe.

== Track listing ==
Santogold – Standard edition
No.	Title	Writer(s)	Producer(s)	Length
1.	"L.E.S. Artistes"	Santi White; John Hill	Jonnie "Most" Davis; White; Hill	3:24
2.	"You'll Find a Way"	White; Hill; Chris Feinstein	Jonnie "Most" Davis; White; Hill; Switch^{[a]}	3:00
3.	"Shove It" (featuring Spank Rock)	White; Hill; Naeem Juwan; David Shayman	Disco D; White; Hill; Switch^{[a]}	3:46
4.	"Say Aha"	White; Hill	White; Hill; Switch^{[a]}	3:35
5.	"Creator" (vs. Switch and Freq Nasty)	White; Hill; David Taylor; Darin McFayden	Freq Nasty; Switch	3:33
6.	"My Superman"	Susan Janet Ballion a.k.a. Siouxsie Sioux; Hill; Wesley Pentz; Steven Severin; White	Hill; Diplo	3:00
7.	"Lights Out"	White; Hill; Feinstein	White; Hill	3:12
8.	"Starstruck"	White; Hill	Hill; Switch^{[a]}; Diplo^{[a]}	3:54
9.	"Unstoppable"	White; Pentz	Diplo; Hill^{[a]}	3:32
10.	"I'm a Lady" (featuring Trouble Andrew)	White; Hill; Andrew; Feinstein	White; Hill	3:43
11.	"Anne"	White; Hill; Taylor	White; Hill; Switch	3:28
12.	"You'll Find a Way" (Switch and Sinden remix)	White; Hill; Feinstein	Switch; Sinden	3:12
Total length:				41:19

Santogold – Japanese edition (bonus tracks)
No.	Title	Writer(s)	Producer(s)	Length
13.	"Your Voice"	White; Chuck Treece; Clifford Pusey; Matt Schleck	White; Hill	3:58
14.	"L.E.S. Artistes" (Switch remix)	White; Hill	Switch	5:14
Total length:				50:31

Notes

- ^{^[a]} signifies an additional producer

== Personnel ==
Credits adapted from the liner notes of Santogold.

Musicians

- Santi White – vocals (all tracks), guitar (track 1), keyboards (tracks 1, 4)
- John Hill – bass, guitar (track 1–4, 7, 10), keyboards (track 1, 3, 4, 10),
- John Morrical – organ (track 2), keyboards (track 10)
- Chuck Treece – drums
- Chris Feinstein – guitar (tracks 2, 4, 7, 10)
- Joao Salomao – guitar (tracks 4, 10)
- Alex Lipsen – keyboards (tracks 7, 10)
- Alfonzo Hunter – horns (tracks 3, 4)
- K. Louis – horns (tracks 3, 4)
- L. Benjamin – horns (tracks 3, 4)
- Mike Dillon – percussion (track 4)
- Spank Rock – additional vocals (track 3)
- Trouble Andrew – additional vocals (track 10)

Artwork

- Isabelle Lumpkin – artwork, design
- Amanda Chiu – design, layout

Production

- Santi White – production (tracks 1–4, 7, 10, 11)
- John Hill – production (tracks 1–4, 6–8, 10, 11, 13, 14), additional production (track 9)
- Switch – production (track 5, 11, 12), additional production (track 2–4, 8)
- Diplo – production (tracks 6, 9), additional production (track 8)
- Jonnie "Most" Davis – production (tracks 1, 2)
- Disco D – production (track 3)
- Freq Nasty – production (track 5)
- Jayson Jackson – executive production

Technical

- Santi White – recording (tracks 1, 2), mixing (tracks 1, 2, 7)
- John Hill – recording (tracks 1–4, 7, 10), mixing (tracks 1, 2, 6–8, 10, 11), engineering (tracks 1–4, 7, 10), programming (tracks 3, 4)
- John Morrical – mixing (tracks 1, 2, 7, 10)
- Vaughan Merrick – mixing (tracks 1, 3, 6, 9, 10)
- Dan Carey – mixing (track 4)
- Switch – mixing (track 5)
- Disco D – programming (track 3)
- Dr. Israel – programming (track 4)
- Ted Jensen – mastering
- Danielle Clare – 2nd engineer, Pro Tools operator (tracks 1, 4, 7, 8, 10)

== Charts ==
=== Weekly charts ===
Weekly chart performance for Santogold
Chart (2008)	Peak position
Australian Albums (ARIA)	64
Belgian Albums (Ultratop Flanders)	25
Dutch Albums (Album Top 100)	34
French Albums (SNEP)	110
Irish Albums (IRMA)	45
UK Albums (OCC)	26
US Billboard 200	74
US Independent Albums (Billboard)	6
US Top Dance Albums (Billboard)	2

=== Year-end charts ===
2008 year-end chart performance for Santogold
Chart (2008)	Position
US Top Dance/Electronic Albums (Billboard)	10
US Independent Albums (Billboard)	41

2009 year-end chart performance for Santogold
Chart (2009)	Position
US Top Dance/Electronic Albums (Billboard)	12

== Certifications ==
Certifications for Santogold
Region	Certification	Certified units/sales
United Kingdom (BPI)	Gold	100,000^{‡}
^{‡} Sales+streaming figures based on certification alone.

== Release history ==
Release history for Santogold
Region	Date	Label	Ref.
United States	April 29, 2008	Downtown	
United Kingdom	May 12, 2008	Lizard King; Atlantic	
Various	May 12, 2008	Lizard King	
Canada	September 16, 2008	Downtown	
