= L.E.S. Artistes =

- UK cover

Single by Santigold

from the album Santogold
- A-side: "Creator"
- Released: March 25, 2008
- Genre: Indie pop; new wave
- Length: 3:43 (original); 3:24 (album version)
- Label: Downtown (US); Atlantic (UK)
- Songwriters: Santi White; John Hill
- Producers: Jonnie "Most" Davis; John Hill

Santigold singles chronology
"Creator" (2008)	"L.E.S. Artistes" (2008)	"Lights Out" (2008)

"L.E.S. Artistes" is the second single by American artist Santigold (known then as Santogold), and along with "Creator", the first to be taken from her self-titled debut Santogold (see 2008 in music).

== Background ==
"L.E.S. Artistes" was written after Santi White moved to New York City. The song "is playing on the fact that everyone tries to make things fancy and it's really pretentious" and "about being accosted by the New York scene and the scenesters and hipsters, who are really not artists and are just pretending to be. They're all about just being seen." The title stands for New York's Lower East Side. "It's not a French thing," White stated in an interview with PopJustice. On MTV's FNMTV, Santigold stated that the title literally meant Lower East Side Artists.

A custom edit of the XXXChange Mix appears in "Grid", a Mark Romanek directed computer-animated commercial for Ford Flex that began running nationally in June 2008.

Curtis Santiago recently did a remix of this song featuring Kevvy Mental of the band Fake Shark - Real Zombie! for a mix tape produced by Mickey Fax.

The song also appears in the video games Band Hero and EA Sports' NHL 08. It also appears in the 2009 comedy 17 Again and the season 3 episode of The Mindy Project 'Best Man'.

This song was in the book 1001 Songs You Must Hear Before You Die.

== Release and reception ==
The single's first commercial release was via the US iTunes Store on March 25, 2008, as a joint single with "Creator". It was released as the b-side to "Creator" through a limited edition 12" vinyl in January 2008, before receiving a full release on May 5. The XXXChange remix was also released. "L.E.S. Artistes" was featured as iTunes' Discovery Download for the week of April 28. The song has received heavy radio play in the UK and was on Radio 1's B List,.

The song was featured on the soundtrack for the video game NHL 08, which was released in September 2007. The song was also featured on MTV reality show, The Hills and has been used twice on 90210. The song appeared in and was featured on the soundtrack of the 2009 movie 17 Again. The song is also used in the advertisement of Blackberry Pearl 3G models.

Rolling Stone said that the track sounds like a "Cars/Strokes mash-up" and that "the lyrics blast pretentious downtowners, but the taut guitars epitomize New York hipness." Drowned in Sound noted that the song is "a slow-burning gem of palm-muted guitar chords." The Denver Post praised the "understated, Police-style guitars that drive" the song, calling them "almost hypnotic, especially with White's intoxicating mezzo-soprano yelping along."

Rolling Stone placed L.E.S. Artistes at #2 on Singles of the Year, McSweeney's listed as one of its "favorite songs of 2008", and Pitchfork Media ranked it #4 at The 100 Best Tracks of 2008 and at #151 on its "Top 500 Tracks of the 2000s." Rolling Stone also ranked it as the #69 song of the 2000s. In October 2011, NME placed it at number 121 on its list "150 Best Tracks of the Past 15 Years".

== Music video ==
The music video, directed by Nima Nourizadeh and shot by director of photography Adam Frisch, is an homage to the film The Holy Mountain. Rolling Stone placed the music video at number four on their bi-weekly Hot List. The video received attention after it was praised by Kanye West on his blog.

The video starts with Santigold in a forest, singing on top of a black horse, while two similar looking women in sunglasses stand at her side and occasionally strike poses. The forest scene ends up with a light snow, following to a scene on a seemingly peaceful street/block. Santigold releases her black horse. People are simultaneously dying, but the gruesome things are replaced with various items: green hot dogs instead of intestines, paint instead of blood, being shot with paintballs rather than bullets. Santigold comes walking down the streets, without dying herself. The video ends with Santigold atop her black horse with her eyes closed.

== Track listing ==
- U.S. digital download
1. Creator – 3:32
2. L.E.S. Artistes – 3:43
- U.S. digital EP
1. L.E.S. Artistes – 3:24
2. L.E.S. Artistes (XXXChange Remix) – 4:20
3. L.E.S. Artistes (Switch Remix) – 5:15
4. L.E.S. Artistes (Instrumental) – 3:45
- UK CD single (ATUK078CD)
1. L.E.S. Artistes – 3:24
2. L.E.S. Artistes (Video) – 3:24
- UK 7" vinyl (ATUK078)
1. L.E.S. Artistes – 3:24
2. Your Voice – 4:00
- UK digital EP
1. L.E.S. Artistes (Switch Remix) – 5:15
2. L.E.S. Artistes (XXXChange Remix) – 4:20
3. L.E.S. Artistes (Herve Edit) – 6:08

== Official versions and remixes ==
- Original Version — 3:43
- Album Version/Radio Edit — 3:24
- Instrumental — 3:45
- Grahm Zilla Remix — 4:26
- Hervé Edit — 6:08
- Switch Remix — 5:15
- XXXChange Remix — 4:20
- XXXChange Remix feat. Mavado — 3:50 (appears on Top Ranking)

== Release history ==
Region	Date	Format
United States	March 25, 2008	
United Kingdom	May 5, 2008	Regular
United Kingdom	August 5, 2008	Digital maxi single

== Chart positions ==
"L.E.S. Artistes" entered the UK Singles Chart at number fifty-one on May 4, 2008. The single rose to number thirty-seven and then a week later climbed to its peak of twenty-seven. It entered Billboard's Hot Modern Rock Tracks at number forty in August 2008, and rose four places the following week.

Chart (2008)	Peak position
Belgium (Ultratip Bubbling Under Flanders)	15
European Hot 100 Singles (Billboard)	87
UK Singles (Official Charts)	27
US Alternative Airplay (Billboard)	36
