= Santigold =

American singer and songwriter (born 1976)

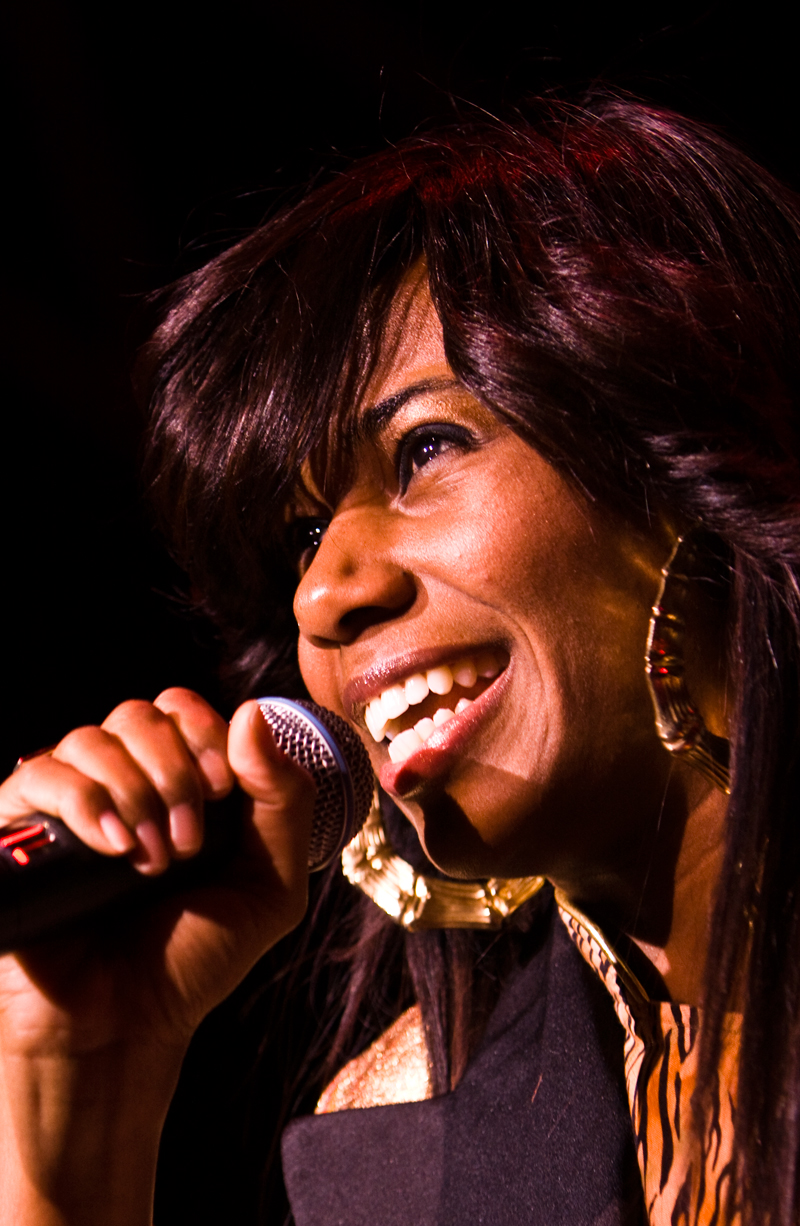
- Santigold performing in 2009

Background information
- Born: Santi White; September 25, 1976 (age 50); Philadelphia, Pennsylvania, U.S.
- Genres: Electronic; new wave; indie; alt-pop; alternative dance
- Occupations: Singer; songwriter; record producer
- Years active: 2001–present
- Labels: Roc Nation; Downtown; Atlantic
- Formerly of: Stiffed
- Website: santigold.com

Santi White (born September 25, 1976), known professionally as Santigold (formerly Santogold), is an American singer and songwriter. Her debut studio album, Santogold (2008), was released by Atlantic Records and met with widespread critical praise for its cross-genre blending of dub, new wave, and hip hop music. Its second single, "L.E.S. Artistes", peaked within the top 40 of the UK Singles Chart.

Her second album, Master of My Make-Believe (2012), was met with continued positive reception and peaked at number 21 on the Billboard 200. It spawned the single "Disparate Youth", which entered the Bubbling Under Hot 100 and moderately entered charts in several countries. Her third album, 99¢ (2016), her second mixtape, I Don't Want: The Gold Fire Sessions (2018), and her fourth album, Spirituals (2022), were each met with continued praise. The latter was described by The Guardian as a "whirlwind album full of feeling and fervour".

Additionally, Santigold has collaborated with artists including Beastie Boys, Jay-Z, Kanye West, Drake, Mark Ronson, David Byrne, Karen O, Tyler, the Creator, ASAP Rocky, The Lonely Island, and Diplo. Her awards include "Best Breakthrough Artist" at the 2008 NME Awards, and the Vanguard Award at 2009 ASCAP Awards.

== Early life ==
Santi White was born on September 25, 1976, in Philadelphia, Pennsylvania, to Ron White, an advisor to mayor John F. Street, and Aruby Odom-White, a psychiatrist. She attended Germantown Friends School in Philadelphia, and later attended college at Wesleyan University, where she double-majored in music and African-American studies. Santi has described herself as “super-social and a connector of people” in her youth, growing up in Philadelphia.

She obtained her pseudonym in the 1990s after a friend gave it to her as a nickname. She worked for Epic Records as an A&R representative but left the position to co-write and executive produce How I Do, the singer Res's debut album.

She was the singer of Philadelphia-based punk rock band Stiffed, which released the EP Sex Sells (2003) and the album Burned Again (2005). Both records were produced by Bad Brains bassist Darryl Jenifer. While in the band, White was offered a solo contract by Martin Heath of London-based independent label Lizard King Records.

== Career ==
=== 2007–2010: Santogold, tour, and other performances ===
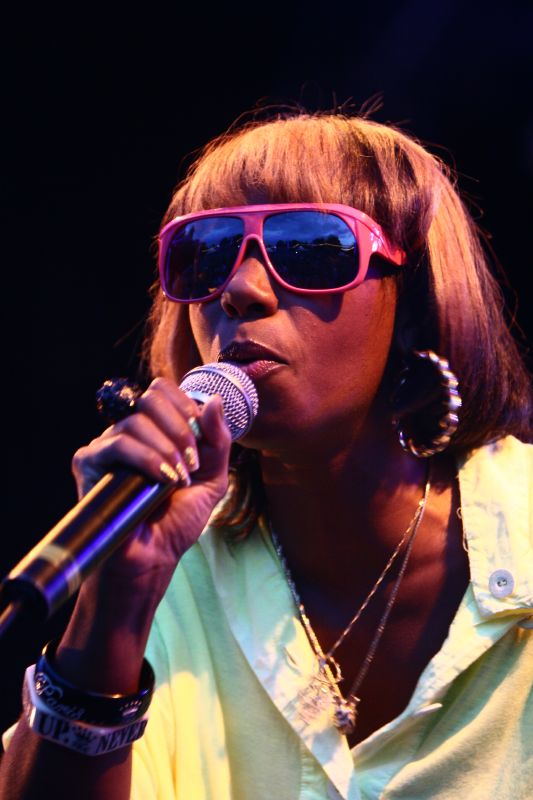
Santigold performing in 2008

Her first singles as a soloist ("Creator" and "L.E.S. Artistes") received attention from Internet media outlets in 2007, and her debut album Santogold, conceived with fellow Stiffed member John Hill, was issued in April 2008. The record featured appearances and production work from Chuck Treece, Diplo, Switch, and Jonnie "Most" Davis, among others. Blending a variety of musical genres ranging from new wave to alternative rock and reggae, the album was very well received by critics upon release and was noted for its "cross-genre confidence".

Santogold was critically acclaimed by both Entertainment Weekly and Spin, while "L.E.S. Artistes" made the number 2 position on Rolling Stone's "Singles of the Year" list. Santogold was sixth on the magazine's "Albums of the Year" list. "Creator", along with "Lights Out", appeared in commercials in the US and the UK.

During the summer of 2008, she released a mixtape CD, Top Ranking: A Diplo Dub, that was well received by Pitchfork and NME. To support Santogold, she toured with M.I.A. and Björk, and in June 2008, Coldplay invited her to be their opening act in the US. Her own US tour was called Goldrush Tour, and upon its completion, she supported Jay-Z and Kanye West on a number of their shows and The Streets at BBC's Electric Proms music festival. She finished the tour opening for Beastie Boys for three concerts on their get-out-the-vote Swing State Tour.

In February 2009, she announced that she changed her stage name to Santigold for reasons related to a possible lawsuit from director Santo Victor Rigatuso, who produced the 1985 film Santo Gold's Blood Circus. She finished the second leg of the tour in August 2009 at the Lollapalooza Festival in Chicago with Billboard noting that she "delivered a bright set and drew a headliner-sized audience" for a late afternoon concert. Before leaving the stage, she announced she was preparing to write her next album.

=== 2011–2013: Master of My Make-Believe ===
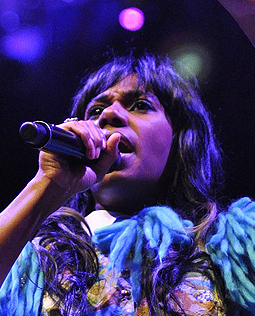
Santigold performing at the House of Blues in 2012

In 2011, Santigold published the song "Go!", which featured Karen O of the Yeah Yeah Yeahs. The track was produced by Switch, Q-Tip and herself, and NME praised it as a "brittle and brilliant brawler of a track" with "great reverberating militaristic kettle-drum booms".

She announced the follow-up to Santogold would be out in spring 2012. It was recorded in part in Jamaica and co-produced in part with TV on the Radio's Dave Sitek. She described Master of My Make-Believe as "sonically eclectic but with some epic curveballs thrown into the mix". She further said, "I want it to be about creating your own reality. I have a song called 'The Keepers': 'We're the keepers, while we sleep in America our house is burning down'." "Big Mouth", the first track and video from the album, was issued in late January as a free download. In February, an animated video for "Disparate Youth" was uploaded to her official YouTube channel as the first single of the album. It was also released on iTunes in the US and later along with several remixes in the UK.

Master of My Make-Believe was released in late April to critical acclaim. "Disparate Youth" was featured in a December 2012 advertisement for the 2013 Honda Civic and a piano version of the song was used in a 2012-13 ad for Direct Line insurance. She then went on tour and opened a few shows on the US leg of the Red Hot Chili Peppers' I'm with You Tour. In May and June, she headlined her own US shows before a summer European tour. On August 15, 2012, she performed on the deck of the USS Intrepid as part of "Stephest Colbchella '012: Rocktaugustfest" on The Colbert Report, and on May 9, 2013, she appeared as herself on The Office episode "A.A.R.M." In 2013, she recorded the song "Girls" for the soundtrack of the series of the same name. She made a special guest appearance as Millie in the Adult Swim original NTSF:SD:SUV::.

=== 2015–2021: 99¢ & I Don't Want: The Gold Fire Sessions ===
In June 2015, she contributed the song "Radio" to the soundtrack of the film Paper Towns. In November, "Can't Get Enough of Myself", the first single of her forthcoming new album 99¢, was released. In February 2016, Santigold released an interactive music video for the song, which allowed viewers to insert themselves in the video, furthering the song's message about self-absorption and promotion in the social media age. Regarding the song and video, Santigold commented: "We have no illusion that we don’t live in this world where everything is packaged. People’s lives, persona, everything, is deliberate, and mediated. It can be dark and haunting and tricky, and freak us out, but it can also be silly and fun and we can learn to play with it". A second track, "Who Be Lovin Me", which featured iLoveMakonnen, was made available in December.

99¢, her third album, was out in February 2016 on Atlantic. Mojo wrote in a four-star review that 99¢ had "pleasure, sunshine and subversion". Santigold then went on tour in the US from March until May.

Santigold released the dancehall-inspired mixtape I Don't Want: The Gold Fire Sessions on July 27, 2018, after announcing it the day before. The album was inspired by Afro-Caribbean music to evoke a "looser, sunnier spirit of summer". The bulk of the material was produced by Mixpak Records founder Dre Skull, with additional material from previous sessions with Ricky Blaze and Diplo. She also embarked on the 10 Years Golder Tour for the tenth anniversary of her debut self-titled album in 2019.

Santigold's "Disparate Youth" is the first song featured on the soundtrack for the Netflix series Unorthodox, released March 26, 2020. Her song "Run the Road" features in Season 1 of the HBO show Euphoria.

=== 2022–present: Spirituals ===
After a four-year musical hiatus, Santigold reemerged in May 2022 with "High Priestess", the lead single from her fourth album, Spirituals. She released "Ain't Ready" in June and announced the title of the album. Spirituals was recorded with familiar collaborators such as Rostam Batmanglij, Boys Noize, Nick Zinner and Dre Skull, as well as new collaborations with Illangelo, Lido and SBTRKT. Two other singles, "Nothing" and "Shake", were released ahead of the album. Spirituals was released worldwide on CD and picture-disc vinyl LP.

Upon its release in September 2022, Spirituals received favorable reviews: NME rated it 4 out of 5 stars, saying that "fearless sonic pioneer leads the pack once again", and The Telegraph wrote that it was a "tonally consistent" record in an 8 out of 10 review. The Guardian hailed it as "a winding journey through a landscape of loneliness, triumph and rage, inspired by African American folk song" and rated it 4 out 5 stars.

In 2024, she toured in the US and Canada in August and September.

=== Collaborations ===
Besides her own work, Santigold has also collaborated with a number of other artists, including Mark Ronson in 2007, David Byrne in 2010 and Beastie Boys in 2011.

She co-wrote the title track for GZA's 1999 album Beneath the Surface, which featured Res. She also co-composed and produced a majority of Res' album How I Do in 2001, and later appeared on the song "Stay in Line" on GZA's 2002 album, Legend of the Liquid Sword.

In 2007, Santigold appeared on Mark Ronson's Version, performing on a cover of The Jam's "Pretty Green", in her first performance credited as Santigold. White co-wrote Lily Allen's "Littlest Things" with Ronson, and co-composed for Ashlee Simpson with Kenna, including the lead single "Outta My Head (Ay Ya Ya)". In 2008, she recorded a song with N.E.R.D's Pharrell Williams and the Strokes' Julian Casablancas for Converse. Santigold explained that the musicians recorded the song separately and did "their own separate thing", "so it ends up being just this weird long song with sort of everybody with lots of their own personalities separate." The song, "My Drive Thru", was available for free on Converse's website.

That same year, she featured vocals on the single "Brooklyn Go Hard" by rap artist Jay-Z: the track, produced by Kanye West, also contained a sample of Santigold's "Shove It".

In 2009, she sang on the track "Whachadoin?" with M.I.A., the Yeah Yeah Yeahs' Nick Zinner, and Spank Rock for DJ collective N.A.S.A.'s debut album, The Spirit of Apollo, as well as a song entitled "Gifted" with Kanye West and Lykke Li. She then collaborated with Basement Jaxx's on their Scars album, adding her vocals to the song "Saga". White collaborated alongside Lil Wayne for Drake's song "Unstoppable", from his mixtape So Far Gone (2009).. Also in 2009, her vocals were included on the Major Lazer track, "Hold the Line". The same year, she also produced several tracks on Devo's 2010 reunion album Something for Everybody.

In 2010, she collaborated with David Byrne, and performed lead vocals on the song "Please Don’t" for Byrne's album Here Lies Love.

Santigold, alongside Switch and Sam Endicott of The Bravery, helped write the Christina Aguilera songs "Monday Morning" and "Bobblehead" for the album, Bionic.

In 2011, she was featured on the single "Don't Play No Game That I Can't Win" by Beastie Boys, which was included on their album. She also took part on the Lonely Island's 2011 album Turtleneck & Chain, lending her vocals to the track "After Party." White collaborated with Spank Rock on "Car Song", for his album Everything Is Boring and Everyone Is a Fucking Liar.

In 2012, Santigold was one of the guests on Amadou & Mariam's album Folila, featuring on the track "Dougou Badia." In 2013, she appeared on ASAP Rocky's debut album, Long. Live. ASAP, featuring on the track "Hell."

In 2015, Santigold was featured in iLoveMakonnen's song "Forever". In 2016, she was featured in OneRepublic's song "Neighbourhood" (listed as NbHD) from their fourth studio album, Oh My My.

In 2017, she was featured on With You.'s "Give It All", along with rapper Vince Staples. The song was featured on the Power Rangers soundtrack, sampling Snap!'s "The Power".

In 2018, she was featured on Matt and Kim's single "Glad I Tried", along with Night Riots' Travis Hawley and Walk the Moon's Kevin Ray. Also in 2018 she and Lil' Yachty were featured on Diplo's track and video "Worry No More".

She contributed vocals to multiple songs on Tyler, the Creator's 2019 album Igor.

In 2021, she was featured on Mark Ronson's track "Do You Do You Know" along with Kathleen Hanna, for the soundtrack of the TV series Watch The Sound.

In 2024, she collaborated with Tyler, the Creator and ScHoolboy Q on the track "Thought I Was Dead", on Chromakopia.

== Artistry and impact ==
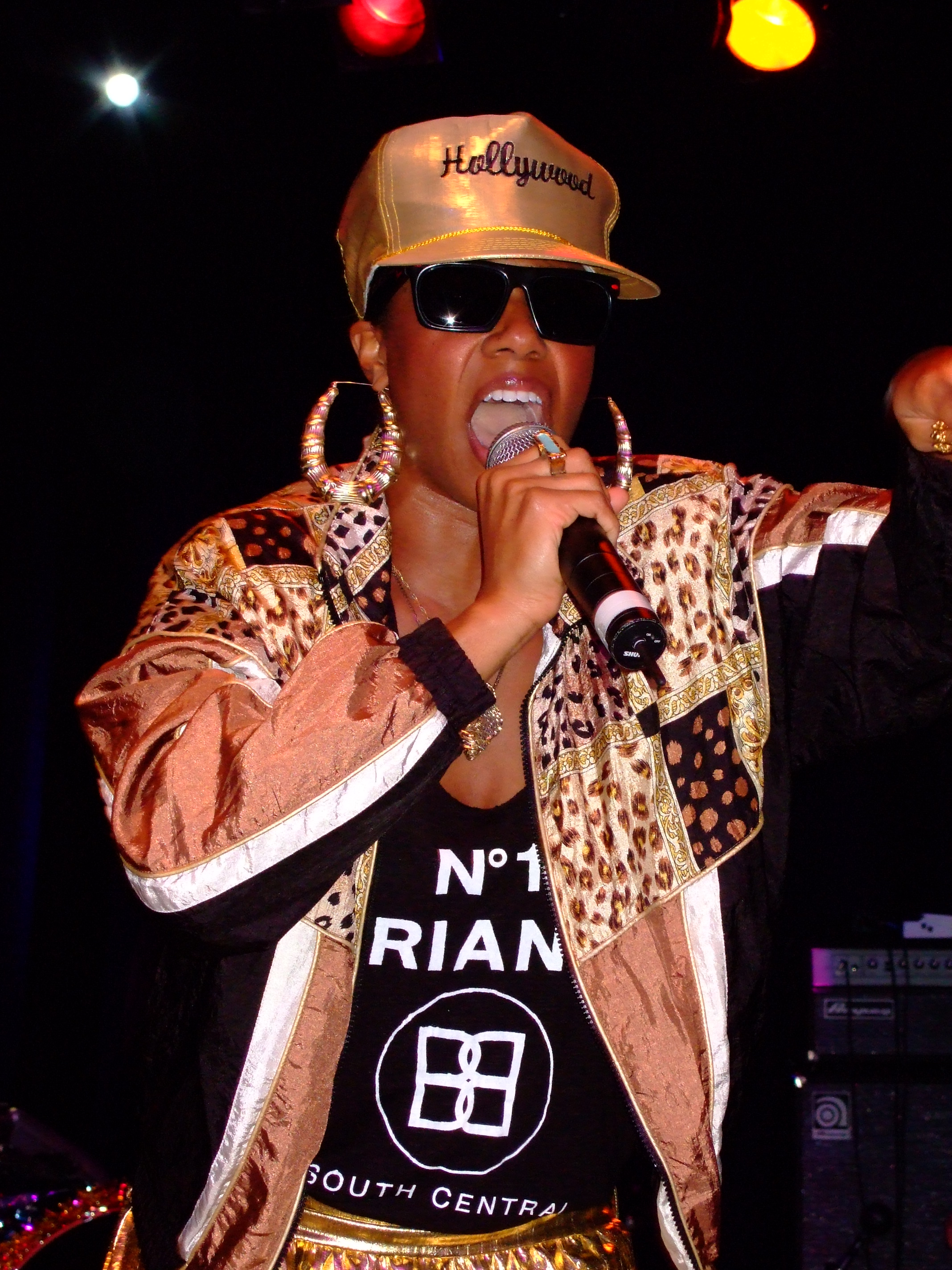
Santigold at Koko, London, August 2008

White has a mezzo-soprano vocal range, and her style in 2008 has been compared often to that of M.I.A. In response to the comparison, White stated that they are both "women who have similar influences and have worked with some of the same people", but that her "music is different and she wasn't influenced by what the press was saying", adding, "I can't think of anybody who would be a better fit of somebody who I'm like... I think what's accurate about that comparison is that she's an artist who has loads of different influences... and is putting things together in a way that's unexpected and genreless."

White has mentioned her liking for dub and punk, and her appreciation of new wave music, saying that "My Superman" is an interpolation of a Siouxsie and the Banshees' song "Red Light". The singer has also stated that she is inspired by 1980s pop music, feeling that it "had a depth to it", and that she hopes to "bring back some more good pop songs." The singer's main influences are James Brown and Aretha Franklin and she has cited Devo as her "ultimate favorite band." White also grew up listening to a lot of reggae, jazz, Fela Kuti and Nigerian music.

=== Legacy ===
Beyoncé gave a shout-out to Santigold in the 2022 track of "Break My Soul (The Queens Remix)", citing her among 29 legendary Black women in music. In the song, Beyoncé name-dropped her creative heroes, and she opened with "Rosetta Tharpe, Santigold/ Bessie Smith, Nina Simone", next to Grace Jones. W magazine wrote that it was "the pop cultural equivalent of a Lifetime Achievement Award".

Australian singer-songwriter Kevin Mitchell, under the moniker of Bob Evans, stated that Santigold's work was an influence for the creation of his fourth album, Familiar Stranger. As part of his performance for the breakfast program of national Australian radio station Triple J in March 2013, Mitchell performed a rendition of Santigold's song "Disparate Youth"—the performance occurred during the conclusion of "O Week" activities (orientation week for Australian universities) at the ABC studios in Melbourne, Australia.

== Personal life ==
Santigold was previously married to Trevor Andrew, with whom she has three children, a son born in 2014 and fraternal twins born in 2018.

== Discography ==
=== Studio albums ===
- Santogold (2008)
- Master of My Make-Believe (2012)
- 99¢ (2016)
- Spirituals (2022)

=== Mixtapes ===
- Top Ranking: A Diplo Dub (2008)
- I Don't Want: The Gold Fire Sessions (2018)

== Awards and nominations ==
| Year | Type | Award | Result |
|---|---|---|---|
| 2008 | NME Awards USA | Best Breakthrough Artist | Won |
| 2008 | Q Awards | Best Breakthrough Artist | Nominated |
| 2008 | MTV Europe Music Awards | Video Star ("L.E.S. Artistes") | Nominated |
| 2008 | mtvU Woodie Awards | Woodie of the Year | Nominated |
| 2008 | UK Festival Awards | Festival Pop Act | Nominated |
| 2008 | Virgin Media Music Awards | Best Album Cover (Santogold) | Nominated |
| 2009 | BRIT Awards | International Female Solo Artist | Nominated |
| 2009 | ASCAP Pop Music Awards | Vanguard Award | Won |
