= Fulcrum Gallery =

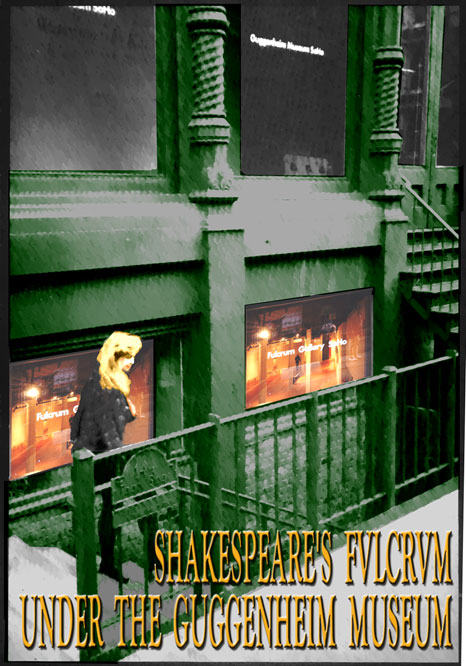
Entrance to Fulcrum under the Guggenheim Museum

Fulcrum Gallery (also known as "Shakespeare's Fulcrum" or "Fulcrum") was an American art gallery that opened underneath the Guggenheim Museum SoHo in New York City in January 1993, by Valerie Monroe Shakespeare. It was designed by her husband, Tery Fugate-Wilcox, who contributed the gallery motto: "Without Art we are but Monkeys with Car Keys". Fugate-Wilcox is credited as photographer on all of the gallery's ads, and was listed as one of the nineteen artists represented by the gallery. The owner said in an interview, that the name "Fulcrum", (written with angular "u's", like old Latin) came from Archimedes, "Give me a place to stand, a lever long enough and a fulcrum. and I can move the Earth". She said she hoped Fulcrum would become a "pivotal point in art history". Fulcrum Gallery was founded to exhibit Actual Art exclusively and did so until the effects of the attacks of 9/11 caused the gallery to close in February 2002.

== History ==
The artist-oriented, artist-designed (by Tery Fugate-Wilcox) gallery was first located in a 5,000-square-foot (460 m^{2}) space at 144 Mercer Street, under the Guggenheim Museum, SoHo. It was most notable for unusual exhibitions: paintings made by the rain, of water-soluble paint; paintings of living grass; dwarf apple trees that grew into glass sculptures; living hermit crabs that moved into glass shells; a forest of two inch, by eight foot, clear tubes (hanging from the ceiling) containing water and one living plant each; paintings made with rust or fluffy gold, silver and copper leaf, (unburnished); drawings of dust on white canvas; and soot from candles or debris from explosions.

== Artists Talk on Art ==
Fulcrum Gallery was home to ATOA (Artists Talk on Art), a non-profit organization that held public forums, panel discussions and open screenings for and about art and artists, every Friday night, at the gallery. Panels at the gallery included such notables as Christo and Jeanne-Claude, Tery Fugate-Wilcox, Leon Golub, Arthur Dantos, Larry Rivers, Holly Solomon, Chuck Close, the Andy Warhol Foundation, Hilton Kramer and Ivan Karp, of O.K. Harris Gallery on subjects like "Come on. What's it really Worth", (how art gets its value); "Two Camels for your Canvas", (on bartering); "The Art Wars: Actual vs. Virtual", (Actual Art versus Virtual Art); "Art Virgins", (collectors on their first art purchases) and "Art & Ethics", (ethical decisions artists face). "Why'd You Make That?" (moderated by Tery Fugate-Wilcox with Chuck Close, on the artist's reasons behind making art).

== Gallery Ads and Publicity ==
Shakespeare's Fulcrum Gallery became notable in the art world for its outrageous artist-designed ads by Tery Fugate-Wilcox in Art Now Gallery Guide and Art in America. The ads were shown by Robert Miller Gallery, as art. The ads were usually accompanied by a series of controversial articles in the Gallery Guide by gallery owner Valerie Monroe Shakespeare, including "Plaza Plop", "Artists of the Aughts", "Shock Schlock", "Dirt, Dust, Rust & Smut". After the exhibition at Robert Miller Gallery, publisher of New York Arts Magazine chose one of the photographs for the cover of their next issue. Valerie Shakespeare's nude torso was to be featured on the cover. The publisher, Abe Lubelski asked Tery Fugate-Wilcox to design the cover. His design is shown below. After stating he was "thrilled with the design" Lubelski asked Fugate-Wilcox to include thin profiles on either side of Shakespeare's image, of Mayor Juliani and Hans Haake, so that the magazine could cash in on a major controversy, at the time, over an artwork, "Nazi Garbage Cans", Haake was showing in the Whitney Museum, as a parody of the Mayor's conflict with the sanitation union.

Original design of New York Arts cover

However, Lubelski then took it upon himself to reduce Shakespeare's figure to a circle, placed in the center of a Nazi flag, without Tery's or Ms. Shakespeare's permission, sparking a lawsuit, which became an episode on Peoples' Court in Nov. 2000.

One ongoing exhibition at Shakespeare's Fulcrum included an all glass beehive, by Robert Dugrenier, which sat in the gallery's front window, with a tube to the outdoors, for the bees to seek out all the rooftop gardens, returning to make wax and honey sculptures inside the hive, programmed by the artist to take the desired form. Many SoHo residents came in to thank the artist for enabling their gardens to bear fruit for the first time. The bees were covered by CNN, in a 4-minute spot that aired all over the world, HBO, Art Now Gallery Guide, New York City Guide, the New York Times, Where Magazine and New York Magazine.

WNYW's Good Day New York did its entire show, with Julie Golden, live from Fulcrum Gallery on March 9, 1995 and the movie Great Expectations used Shakespeare's Fulcrum Gallery in one of its scenes.

The "exploded" painting, ensuing party and Dragon

The gallery's exhibitions were also featured on NY1, for Earth Day, during and exhibition of grass "paintings" by Maria Ceppe.

CBS, WNYW, NBC, and ABC, covered, along with the New York Times, art exploded in the street by Tery Fugate-Wilcox on Chinese New Year despite a ban on explosives by Mayor Giuliani. The owner, Valerie Shakespeare was interviewed during the huge Chinese dinner party, open to the public, and asked what she thought of the Mayor allowing a SoHo art gallery to set off explosives, while banning the same for all of Chinatown, breaking their 5000-year-old traditions? Ms. Shakespeare was seen on all the networks, saying, "I think it stinks!"

== Shakespeare's Fulcrum Dinners ==
Fulcrum gallery began, like many other galleries, having "regular" openings with tiny cups of white wine. But being raised in Arizona, Shakespeare's sense of hospitality moved her to offer food as well. After a particularly crowded opening, for which she had cooked all day, she noticed the neither she, nor none of her artists, staff or collectors had gotten anything to eat. As she sat in a restaurant, buying dinner for over 30 people, she wondered, "What's wrong with this picture?" So began her signature sit-down dinners every week, for friends and supporters of Actual Art.

In 1997, Fulcrum Gallery moved to a two-level space, complete with outdoor sculpture garden for art to weather, and a firepole, at 480 Broome Street, in SoHo. This gallery was also artist-designed, by Tery Fugate-Wilcox.

The gallery continued at the Broome Street location, where the installation of a full kitchen permitted the gallery's weekly sit-down dinners to be expanded for 35 to 45 people and the occasional buffet party for hundreds, including the dinner party for Chinese New Year, with art by Tery Fugate-Wilcox, that was blown up on the street, complete with fireworks and a dragon for the celebration, during a ban by Mayor Rudy Giuliani on explosives, and a Nude Portrait Marathon with Barneby Ruhe making conventional paintings of nude models, while Tery Fugate-Wilcox had living nudes standing in huge frames on the walls of the gallery. Some of the most notable works at the new location included: a glass beehive, by Robert DuGrenier; a 55-gallon glass tank of water that grew slime and algae, by Tery Fugate-Wilcox; steel drawings made by rusting etched steel plates in a studio under the sea.

There, the gallery became well known in the artworld, for its sit-down dinner parties, every Tuesday night, which Shakespeare cooked herself and served on an ever-expanding long table, down the center of the gallery. The dinners were "intimate affairs for forty or fifty people", including such celebrity guests as Michael Kennedy, Mary McFadden, Robert De Niro, Robert Goulet, Eric Douglas, John DeLorean, John F. Kennedy Jr. and his wife, Carolyn, many of whom bought art, supported the gallery or just loved to "hang out".

Model of the San Andreas Fault Sculpture, by Tery Fugate-Wilcox

In addition, Shakespeare's Fulcrum always had an ongoing exhibit of the San Andreas Fault Sculpture Project, by Tery Fugate-Wilcox, in its own space, complete with model, maps of the proposed site, plate tectonics information, seismic graphs, stereoscopic aerial photographs of the entire San Andreas Fault, taken by practice runs of the U2 spy planes, on special maneuvers, requested by the Geologic Survey.

The gallery closed in 2002, when the effects of the September 11, 2001 attacks effectively closed down SoHo. Although the gallery struggled to keep its doors open, especially since several of its staff were living in the gallery, after they were made homeless by the collapse of the twin towers, the inability, coupled with unwillingness of clients to fly into New York City in the aftermath of the tragedy, finally caused Fulcrum Gallery, along with many other galleries and businesses, to go out of business and close its doors permanently.

== Chronological list of one-person exhibitions ==
"Painting Brushes" "Collection" "3500 A.D. Diffusion" "2500 A.D. Diffusion" Silver, Copper & Gold fluffy leaf Tetrahedrons

- Tery Fugate-Wilcox: paintings made with shotguns, explosives or lightning; "dust drawings"; metals that oxidize, or diffuse together over thousands of years; the actuality of any material.
- Nathan Slate Joseph, of Israel: wall pieces of pigmented and galvanized steel, weathered over many years.
- Elaine Lorenze: with living plants in concrete.
- Richard Thatcher: uranium, transmuting to lead, encased in metal boxes.
- Robert DuGrenier: glass shells house living hermit crabs & glass beehive, home to thousands of bees making wax & honey sculptures.
- Maria Ceppi, of Switzerland: living grass growing in patterns on canvas, or paintings made of scented soap.
- Merrill Wagner: steel allowed to rust in patterns; slate & rocks, weathered with pigments.
- Yutaka Kobayashi, of Japan: rust imbedded in handmade paper or concrete & stone sculptures; "Whisper with the Earth" in conjunction with the Guggenheim Museum, SoHo's exhibition, "Scream at the Sky" an exhibition of young modern Japanese artists.
- Dan Dempster, of Bermuda: steel drawings taken under sea, allowing salt water to "etch" the drawings into the steel;
- Helene Aylon: employing the qualities of linseed oil to "bleed" into patterns or form a "skin" that eventually breaks.
- Michelle Brody: living plants suspended in long, hanging tubes of water.
- David Myers: lead shot enclosed in clear, interactive tabletop.
- Alexia Nikov, of Russia: paintings made of metal powders, patinas on canvas.
- Tony Reason, of England: rust in encaustic on linen.
- William Anastasi: steel plate rusts in patterns from periodic pouring of water.

== Group exhibitions ==
- "Swords into Plowshares", weapons, ammunition, explosives and materials of war made into art: including a nosecone from a "Mace" missile, covered in fluffy gold leaf, crushed or cut-up guns, (Tery Fugate-Wilcox); an ancient stone cannonball gleaned from a shipwreck, (Dan Dempster); art made with explosives and fuses,(Gregg Degn and Tery Fugate-Wilcox); art made out of lead bullets, (Gregg Degn) and works using materials of war.
- "Dirt, Dust, Rust, Smut & Soot", sculptures, paintings and drawings using the elements named as materials of the art. (The gallery got a lot of porn submitted for that one.) The show included "paintings" of soil and grass by Maria Ceppi and sculpture with plants in dirt by Elaine Lorenze, which cover both "dirt" and "smut", which mean the same thing; "Dust Drawings", employing static electricity to draw dust to the canvasses by Tery Fugate-Wilcox; Rust paintings by Yutaka Kobayashi, Tony Reason and Alexia Nikov, rusty sculptures by Dan Dempster; works with candles making patterns of soot by Michelle Brody and Tery Fugate-Wilcox.
- "Beyond Virtual...Back to Actual", an exhibition celebrating the "actual" qualities of materials, that is, its ability to evolve and change over time. (See Actual Art)
- "Artist of the Aughts", foreshadowing the art of the 21st century.
- "As is", promoting the idea of "What you see is what you get" in art.
- "Rust Never Sleeps" an exhibition of 14 artists, all using rust as the primary material in their art.
- "Time will Tell", a reprise of an exhibition, curated by Valerie Shakespeare at Squibb International, in Princeton, New Jersey prior to the opening of the gallery, which focused on works that changed quickly enough to be noticeable during the run of three-month summer show.
