= Gema Alava =

Spanish artist

Gema Alava (b. 1973 Madrid, Spain) is an artist who lives and works in New York City. Her work, in the form of installation, drawing, photography and art projects, deals with what she calls "contradictory truths", and the capacity to "create a maximum by reversing a minimum." Álava's art projects, in the form of dialogues, verbal descriptions, rumors and random encounters, explore notions of trust and intimacy, and use language as a medium to investigate the interconnections that exist between public, private, educational and interpretative aspects of art." In 2012, she was appointed Cultural Adviser to the World Council of Peoples for the United Nations.

In 2020, she published the highly influential book Como perder el miedo en un museo. (Ed. El Ojo de la Cultura), presented at the Cervantes Institute, Instituto Cervantes in London, England; the MAAC Museum, Museo Antropologico y de Arte Contemporaneo in Guayaquil on the International Day of Museums invited by the International Council of Museums ICOM Ecuador; the International Book Fair of Bogota, Colombia, FILBO; and the International Summit of Archives in Cuzco, Peru, supported by the International Council on Archives, ICA.

She writes both in English and Spanish for the magazine Frontera Digital:FronteraD.

She has received a M.F.A.(New Genres) from the San Francisco Art Institute, a M.F.A (Painting) from the Academy of Art University, a B.F.A (Painting) from the Facultad de Bellas Artes de Madrid, Universidad Complutense and the Chelsea College of Art and Design, The London Institute, and holds a M.A.in Art Education from the Universidad Complutense de Madrid.

In 1995, she was awarded second prize in Spain's National Penagos Drawing Competition, being the youngest artist to achieve such recognition. That same year she received an Erasmus Grant for an Erasmus Programme. In 1997 she obtained a Fellowship for postgraduate studies in the United States from La Caixa Foundation. In 2002 she participated simultaneously in the Emerge Program at the Bronx Museum of the Arts, New York, and the AIM Program at Aljira, a Center for Contemporary Art, New Jersey.

Alava's work has been exhibited and presented internationally, including the Rana Museum in Norway; the Solomon R. Guggenheim Museum, New York; the Queens Museum of Art, New York; the Margulies Art Collection at the Warehouse, Miami; the Juan Carlos I Center at New York University; the Bronx Museum of the Arts, New York; the United Nations Building, New York, and Manifesta 8, The European Biennial. Her first solo show in NYC was at Lance Fung Gallery.

Participants of Alava's art projects include Miguel Álvarez-Fernández, Angela Bulloch, Alison Knowles, Eduardo Lago, Cai Guo-Qiang, Ester Partegas, Robert Ryman, Jason Schmidt, Merrill Wagner and Lawrence Weiner.

She lectures at the Museum of Modern Art, the Solomon R. Guggenheim Museum, the Metropolitan Museum, the Whitney Museum of American Art and at the Morgan Library & Museum, in New York City.

== Work ==
Alava's work has been described as "minimalist studies in what might be called the qualities of fragility" by Sandra Sider, of Fiber Arts magazine; "drawing (...) with thread and shadows in an almost invisible wall installation" by Holland Cotter of The New York Times; "it achieves the impossible; it makes us pay attention to things we don't pay attention to anymore", by Alfonso Armada of Diario ABC; "often made from the humblest of materials, her art nevertheless gives off just the faintest trace of intense and prolonged concentration. Modest in scale, frequently fragile, it makes you think not of modesty or fragility but of resistance and struggle, life and death, the largest matters. Alava has a gift for effortless reversals that she does not hesitate to use in making her mortal point." by Ted Mooney for Artists Organized Art, Senior Editor of Art in America.

== Chronology ==
For List of Things to Forget (2000), Alava creates a quilt with handwritten business letters from 1912 that resemble love letters. The stage created for this installation disappears, piece by piece, day after day, until the gallery is empty.

For Land of No One (2000), pieces of letters are attached with sewing pins to the wall allowing "the possibility of its own destruction if we walk or breathe too close to it."

For Tightropewalkers (2000), Alava invites the audience to enter into an empty room with drawings on the wall made out of thread, sewing needles and shadows.

For Fe's Patterns (2003), an installation commissioned by the Queens Museum of Art, paper patterns and needles, hanging from thread, move in a choreography created by the air from the museum's air conditioning system.

For Clothing (2006), a site-specific installation commissioned by New York University made out of more than two hundred small golden shirts hanging from thread, Alava deals with the idea of recovering memories that are in danger of being lost, especially the memories of the Spanish Civil War.

For Tell Me the Truth (2008), Alava invites the audience to enter a small room with nine black and white photographs depicting the struggle between a nail and a thread, both anchored to the floor. Alava does not allow anyone to see the original scenarios.

For Tell Me a Lie (2008), Alava transforms a circular installation into an oval installation at the Cervantes Institute, New York.

For Tell Me a Story (2008), gold leave and tissue paper, attached to the wall with pins, move as the humidity of the room changes.

For A Dialogue (2008), Alava establishes a conversation with artist Cai Guo-Qiang on the ramp of the Solomon R. Guggenheim Museum in February 2008. Alava's selected written proposal of A Dialogue is exhibited from February to May at the Guggenheim Museum as part of "Cai Guo-Qiang: "I Want to Believe."

For Tell Me (2008–2009), Alava invites twenty-two artists to have a one-on-one conversation with her in an art museum when the museum is closed to the public, and to answer three questions. The visual documentation of these conversations is recorded by the security cameras of the museum but the images cannot be used for artistic purposes. The project ends when Alava personally invites the director of the museum to participate in this ephemeral and impossible-to-document art project.,

For Find Me (2009), Alava asked artists Lars Chellberg, Barbara Holub, Paul Kos, Ester Partegàs, Merrill Wagner, Robert Ryman, Arne Svenson, Lawrence Weiner and Maria Yoon, to create an artwork in order for her to hide it somewhere in New York City and the Tenderloin District of San Francisco. The locations remain secret—just Alava and the artists who made the pieces for FIND ME know where his/her pieces are. Alava shared general information of these locations at an Art Event at CUE Art Foundation, in New York City. Alava also hid at the Main San Francisco Public Library an artist book titled FIND ME 2.0 with the exact locations.

For Trust Me (2010), Alava met individually in one of two museums in New York City with eleven participants who agreed to wear opaque glasses during the time Alava performed one-on-one verbal descriptions of artworks they could not see. Jason Schmidt documented the project. On May 14, 2010, during nine consecutive hours, the performances took place. On October 15, 2010, TRUST ME's presentation was hosted at the Cervantes Institute in New York City. Participants met each other and saw for the first time photographs taken by Schmidt during their individual walk-throughs with Alava. Participants of Trust Me: Ellen Fisher, Mayrav Fisher, Jonathan Goodman, Jessica Higgins, Erika Kawalek, Erika Knerr, Alison Knowles, Ferran Martin, J. Morrison, Gordon Sasaki and J. G. Zimmerman,

For the book project Tell Me the Truth/Dime la verdad, 2008-2013 (2013), Alava asks eleven professionals from different fields to write an essay about the possibility or impossibility of telling truths in their fields: science, law, art, journalism, politics, history. A limited soft-cover edition of 500 books were printed in 2013 by Gema Alava Studio. A limited soft-cover edition of 500 books were printed in 2013 by Gema Alava Studio.

In 2015 she premiers the installation Hexágonos at the CSIC Headquarters Spanish National Research Council in Madrid, Spain. Made of 24 carat gold leaf hexagons on the floor, the ephemeral piece compares artists to bees. Alava explains: "like bees, artists cannot create and fulfill their potential when they are exploited or poisoned. If they are not allowed to pollinate due to ignorance, lack of attention or premeditation, their honeycombs and nectar of knowledge falls to the ground. Bees and artists can feel sick and abandon their beehive; and without pollination humanity cannot survive." This installation is the foundation of the international project HEXAGONS. founded in 2018: HexagonsGlobal.com

== Television ==
- El Mundo Multimedia 2013
- RTVE/NCI NOTICIAS IBEROAMERICANAS. "Una performance basada en la confianza" December 2010
- RTVE - Radiotelevision Espanola Interview with Gema Alava. May 2010
- NCI Noticias. NCI Noticias Interview with Gema Alava 2008
- Plum TV. Heart Happening 2010
