= Actual Art =

Actual Art is a genre of art that was first named by critic Alfred Frankenstein of the San Francisco Chronicle in a review of Helene Aylon’s work. The name was chosen because the art was "real", but the term realism was already in use. Frankenstein described Aylon's work as a genre of art that involves “the self-conscious enlistment of the forces of nature, by artists, toward the completion of their art”. Collaboration with nature necessarily brings the dimension of time into as an integral component of the artworks, with some requiring many thousands of years for their completion. The artists consider the future of the work to be as important as its present, relinquishing control over the work to nature.

== History ==
In 1982, the Actual Art Foundation formed in the Tribeca district of New York City to promote exclusively artists working in the Actual Art genre, and in 1985, obtained its 501-C3 not-for-profit tax-exempt status to fund exhibitions of Actual Art and projects proposed by Actual Artists. The most notable early exhibitions sponsored by the Actual Art Foundation were:

- "It's About Time" at the New York City Gallery in 1983
- "Time Will Tell" at Squibb International, Princeton, NJ in 1984
- "Slow Kinetic Art" at the Wadsworth Athenium, Hartford, CT
- "Time Waits..." co-sponsored with Johannes, 11th Prince of Thurn and Taxis and his wife Gloria at Schloss St. Emmeram in Regensburg, Bavaria, Germany.

The "Time Will Tell" exhibit was documented in articles appearing in the New York Times, the Bergen County Record, the Princeton Packet, and the Trentonian.

The headquarters of Actual Art Foundation was also used for an episode of Law & Order circa 1990, featuring Actual Art. Actual Art Foundation lost its Tribeca headquarters in the attacks of 9/11 and created an Art Center at Candlewood Lake in Connecticut

== About ==
In Actual Art, what future generations will see is programmed into the work, making time an element of the work, as well as space, form or color. The artists introduce time as a tool in the making of art. Actual Art is about energy; specifically, about the energy and life in the materials. Words like “decay”, “deterioration” or “destruction” are replaced with “change”. Tery Fugate-Wilcox is quoted as saying, “The work will last forever, as long as you understand it changes.” Actual Art moves one to think about ways to work with nature instead of fighting it. In place of the constant attempts to inhibit materials’ natural tendency to change (to the detriment of the planet), man might be examining and exploiting the inherent qualities of the materials we work with. Actual Artists have a visionary sense of the natural order of the material world.

== Artists ==
- Helene Aylon, whose work employing the qualities of linseed oil to “bleed” into patterns or form a “skin”, prompted the naming of the genre by Alfred Frankenstein; "'Actualism' because 'Realism' is already taken."
- Michelle Brody, who suspended living plants in long, hanging tubes of water;
- Maria Ceppi, of Switzerland, grew grass in patterns on canvas & scented soap paintings;
  "Grass Alive # IX" by Maria Ceppi, grass on cotton duck, 46" x 46"
- Gregg Degn, using gunpowder, lead, explosives & fuses to make intricate & evolving paintings & sculpture;
- Dan Dempster, of Bermuda, who took his drawings beneath the sea, to allow the salt water to etch his drawings into steel & whose work was reviewed in American Mensa
  "Dubhe" by Dan Dempster, etched steel & sea water, 23" x 27"
- Robert DuGrenier, whose hand-blown glass pieces are permanently part of the trees, as they grow into and become one with the sculptures;
  Untitled by Robert DuGrenier, two hermit crabs that have moved into hand-blown glass shells
  Untitled by Robert DuGrenier, hand blown glass sculptures on tree
  hand-blown glass "sea" shells, that living hermit crabs move into and take as their homes; and a glass beehive, that is home to thousands of Italian honey bees who busy themselves making wax & honey sculptures, as programmed into the construction of the hive, by the artist.
- James Horton, who used the materials of photography as a painting medium.
- Nathan Slate Joseph, of Israel, making gigantic wall pieces of pigmented & galvanized steel that have weathered over many years; Joseph was commissioned to create all of the art, including major indoor & outdoor installations by the King David Dan Hotel in Elat, Israel.
- Yutaka Kobayashi, of Japan, imbedding rust in handmade paper or concrete & stone sculptures;
- Elaine Lorenze, with living plants in concrete;
- David Myers, put lead shot in enclosed, tilting table, making endless patterns;
  "Contemplation" by David Myers, lead shot & mixed media, 38" x 38" by 30"
- Alexia Nikov, of Russia, whose metallic paintings change over time from the effects of patinas & the environment;
  "Desna" by Alexia Nikov, metal powders, rain & patinas on canvas, 60" x 72"
- Tony Reason, of England, who works with rust in encaustic on linen;
  "Winding" by Tony Reason, rust in encaustic on linen, 44" x 44"
- Richard Thatcher, encasing uranium, transmuting to lead, in exquisite metal boxes;
- Merrill Wagner, using steel, allowed to rust in patterns, slate & rocks, weathered with pigments;
- Terry Ward, declared an important new Actual Art-ist by key movement leader Tery Fugate-Wilcox during Ward's solo art exhibit in the World Trade Center / World Financial Center complex.
- Tery Fugate-Wilcox, uses water-soluble paint & rain to make ever-changing painting on canvas;
  "RYB" by Tery Fugate-Wilcox, vegetable pigments & rain on canvas, 48" x 60"

Called the “Avatar of Actualism” He uses rain to make paintings of water-soluble paint; shotguns, explosives & lightning; dust in “dust drawings”; metals that oxidize, or diffuse together over thousands of years, the actuality of any material. His work is in the collections of the Guggenheim, the Museum of Modern Art in New York, the Wadsworth Athenium in Hartford, Connecticut, the National Gallery of Australia, and a 36-foot (11 m) sculpture purchased by the City of New York for J. Hood Wright Park.

Other galleries exhibiting Actual Art include:

- John Gibson Gallery, (Donald Lipsky & Eve Andree Laramee);
- Sandra Gehring Gallery, (William Anastasi & Dove Bradshaw Thomas McEvilley)

Other artists generally included in the genre of Actual Art or "Actualism", include:

- Andy Goldsworthy
- Forrest Myers
- Allen Sonfist
- Cheryl Safren

Perhaps the most ambitious work of art envisioned by an Actual artist is the San Andreas Fault Sculpture Project, proposed by Tery Fugate-Wilcox, which the Actual Art Foundation has committed to sponsoring.

Model of the San Andreas Fault Sculpture, by Tery Fugate-Wilcox

This proposed 1-acre slab of concrete, 20 feet (6.1 m) thick, is intended to span the San Andreas Fault, which (through tectonic action) will rip the artwork in half, sending the west half northward (towards Alaska) over the next few million years or so.

== References: Books ==
- Lucy Lippard (1973). Six Years: The Dematerialization of the Art Object from 1966 to 1972. University of California Press.
- Diana Chicure; Thelma Stevens (1974). Super Sculpture, New York. Van Nostrand.
- Alan Sonfist (1978). Natural Phenomenon as Public Monuments. Neuberger Museum Press.
- Clockwork: Timepieces by Artists, Architects, & Industrial Designer by MIT List Visual Arts, 1989 (Specifically: "In New York City, an internal clock is physically inherent in the materials employed by Fugate-Wilcox in the construction of his many Diffusion Pieces.")
- Andy Goldsworthy: a Collaboration with Nature, by Andy Goldsworthy, publ. H.N. Abrams, 1990
- Studio International by Medical Tribune Group. Univ.of Michigan. 1992.
- Mutiny and the Mainstream: Talk that Changed Art, by Judy Seigal, publ. Midmarch Art Press, 1992 (Specifically: "[Lawrence] Alloway included Helene Aylon here, showing two stages of her 'paintings that change in time'.")
- Merrill Wagner (1994). Time and Materials. University Press.
- Dan Dempster: Waterworks, 1990–1997, by Peter Barton, publ. Peninsula Fine Arts, 1997
- Eleanor C. Munro (2000). Originals: American Women Artists. De Capa Press.
- Thomas McEvilly (2003). The Art of Dove Bradshaw: Nature, Change & Indeterminacy. Mark Batty Publishing.
- Art's Prospect: the Challenge of Tradition in an Age of Celebrity, by Roger Kimball, publ. Ivan R. Dee, 2003
- Malcolm Miles (2005). New Practices, New Pedagogies. Routledge.
- The Art of Nathan Joseph: Building a Picture, by Michael J. Amy & Marius Kwint, publ. Antique Collectors' Club, 2007
- Anne Pasternak; Michael Brenson; Ruth A. Peltason; Lucy Lippard (2007). Creative Time: 33 years of Public Art in New York. Princeton Architectural Press.
