= Catawissa =

Catawissa may refer to the following:

- Catawissa, Missouri, an unincorporated community
- Catawissa (tugboat), a registered historic place in Waterford, New York
- Catawissa, Pennsylvania, a borough in Columbia County
  - Catawissa Township, Columbia County, Pennsylvania, located in the above borough
  - Catawissa Friends Meetinghouse, located in the above borough
  - Catawissa Bottling Company, located in the above borough
- Catawissa Creek, a tributary of the North Branch Susquehanna River in Pennsylvania
