= Will Ryman =

American artist (born 1969)

- Born: 1969 (age 56–57); New York City, US
- Known for: Sculpture, installation
- Website: www.willryman.com

Will Ryman is an American artist known for his large-scale sculptures and public art projects.

== Early life and career ==
Will Ryman was born on December 29, 1969, in New York City to the family of Robert Ryman.

In his early twenties, pursuing a career as a playwright, Ryman began taking playwriting workshops, and immersed himself in the work of Samuel Beckett, Jean-Paul Sartre, and Eugene Ionesco.

For twelve years, Ryman wrote his own plays while working a series of jobs as a script reader, a prep chef, and a line cook. In 1999, Ryman’s Absurdist play The Encounter debuted at New York’s Trilogy Theater.

At the age of 32, Ryman began to make sculptures of the characters in his plays in an effort to “envision them more fully.” Ryman created these sculptures out of a desire to "let the play's scenery tell the whole story, and to create theater with no lines or actors, but just the world itself."

A self-taught visual artist, Ryman made his earliest works from papier-mâché and combined household materials and everyday objects. As Ryman recounts, “I basically took apart my bookshelves and my coat tree and got some papier-mâché and built a hundred or so figures about four feet tall.”

These small expressive sculptures with outstretched arms and wailing mouths evolved into an artwork Ryman titled “The Pit,” which was shown in his first gallery exhibition in 2004 at Klemens Gasser & Tanja Grunert in Chelsea, and in 2005 as part of “Greater New York” at P.S.1 in Long Island City, which helped launch his career as an artist.

Ryman developed an ambitious large-scale sculpture practice using materials as varied as coal, steel, computer parts, paper towels, bullets, and bronze.

== Early exhibitions ==
Will Ryman’s first public art project, Wall Street, 2008, was exhibited at 7 World Trade Center, New York City. The artist produced a sculptural tableau of a typical New York street scene consisting of fifteen characters including businessmen in suits, people waiting for a bus, a man eating a hot dog, and a woman reading a newspaper. The sculptures ranging from three-inches tall to fifteen feet in height, were made of papier-mâché, epoxy resin, wire mesh, acrylic, wood, and cloth.

In 2010, Ryman created The Dinner Party, a larger-than-life dinner scene evoking Leonardo da Vinci’s The Last Supper made of steel, wood, epoxy resin, nails, tile, aluminum, flock, wire, resin, plastic, glass, and chain. This installation exhibited at The Margulies Collection at the Warehouse, Miami, was the second dinner-themed installation by Ryman.

Family Dinner, 2005, a sculpture of a domestic dinner scene exuding an unsettling tone, was shown at the Tracy Williams Ltd. Gallery, New York in 2005. This artwork was acquired by and exhibited in 2008 at the 21C Museum Collection, Louisville.

== Park Avenue roses ==
Organized by the Fund for Park Avenue Sculpture Committee and the New York City Department of Parks and Recreation, in 2011, Ryman’s public art project The Roses On Park Avenue, 2010, was unveiled on Park Avenue between 57th and 67th Streets in New York City. Ryman installed thirty-eight sculptures of roses towering as high as twenty-five feet and twenty individual scattered petals in the medians along Park Avenue. Climbing the thorny roses were sculptures of aphids, beetles, ladybugs, and ants made of fiberglass resin and stainless steel. The underlying concept for the installation was a critique of commercialism and an interrogation of our endless search for beauty and lasting perfection. New York Times critic Dorothy Spears wrote, “…in their cartoonish display of human expectation and failure, [The Roses] also owe a powerful debt to Mr. Ryman’s lingering fascination with absurdist theater.” Ryman’s initial designs for the Park Avenue installation included a large-scale coffee cup, an empty Doritos bag, and extinguished matches strewn like litter among the flowers. Those artworks were later deemed by the approval committee as conflicting with the city’s anti-trash campaign and removed from the design. Following the Park Avenue exhibition, which was positively reviewed and garnered much attention, Ryman has exhibited individual Rose sculptures at museums including The Phillips Collection, Washington D.C., the Frist Art Museum, Nashville, and LongHouse Reserve, East Hampton (2019).

In 2011, Ryman produced monochrome red, yellow, and blue versions of his large-scale Rose sculptures for the exhibition Will Ryman: Desublimation of the Rose at the Fairchild Tropical Botanic Garden, Coral Gables.

== Other public art projects and exhibitions ==
Presented by the New York City Department of Transportation’s Urban Art Program and the Flatiron/23rd Street Partnership, in 2013, Ryman’s Bird was installed in New York City’s Flatiron Square Plaza. Acquired by the Broad Art Museum, East Lansing, Bird (2012), is a twelve-foot high, twelve-foot wide, and fourteen-foot long sculpture, made with over 5,000 actual and fabricated nails in the shape of a bird. The bird weighs five tons, and it stands on a nest of ninety thousand nails.

Also in 2013, Ryman produced America, a recreation of Abraham Lincoln’s childhood log cabin, which examines the origins of capitalism and its complexities within the scope of American history. Assembled from real logs covered entirely in gold leaf, Ryman lined the interior walls and floor of the room-sized cabin with materials that had contributed to the development of America’s economy — including arrowheads, slavery shackles, bullets, pills, tobacco, and iPhones, arranged in grids. First exhibited at Kasmin Gallery, New York in 2013, America was acquired by the collectors Sydney and Walda Besthoff for the New Orleans Museum of Art where it is on permanent view.

Furthering his examination of American Capitalism and mass production, in 2014 Ryman created Cadillac, a life-sized sculpture of a 1958 Eldorado Biarritz Cadillac convertible fabricated entirely out of resin and Bounty paper towels. Ryman’s sculpture blended two iconic American brands: one, a post-war symbol of luxury, class, and power, and the other, a mass-produced disposable product. In 2015 the sculpture was exhibited in Anxious Spaces: Installation as Catalyst II, Knockdown Center, Queens NY and in 2017 at the CCS Galleries, College for Creative Studies, Detroit.

Taking nearly three years to construct, Will Ryman’s The Situation Room, 2014 was exhibited at Kasmin Gallery, New York in 2015. Will Ryman’s life-size tableau made of fiberglass, wood, fabric, epoxy, coated with coal, is based on Pete Souza’s iconic photograph of President Obama, military officials, and members of the administration viewing in real time from the Situation Room of the West Wing, Osama bin Laden’s capture in Pakistan in 2011. Ryman deliberately reduced the dramatic narrative to its elemental parts. By covering the sculpted tableau in crushed coal - a polemical natural resource since The Industrial Revolution - Ryman alludes to the complicated consequences of human progress and to the eternal existence of war throughout history. The artist explains, “I erased a lot of the identity of the faces in that room, because for me, the interesting thing about the piece is the situation itself. It is one that has been repeating itself throughout history and will probably continue to repeat itself.” Ryman’s sculpture transforms an illustration of a crucial military action by an American president into a timeless representation of leadership in the face of war.

Ryman’s first public art project in Europe was a three-part installation created for Parc de la Villette, Paris. Surrounding the park’s Place de la Fontaine aux Lions, Ryman placed seven sulfur-yellow sculpted “heads” ranging in height from three to four meters. Sculpted in clay, cast in resin, and then painted, Will Ryman’s abstract forms were titled with lines from Samuel Beckett’s Waiting for Godot, 1948. Ryman’s Sisyphus, a four-meter tall dark bronze sculpture titled after Albert Camus’ absurdist narrative, was installed on the Prairie du Cercle Nord. Ryman’s Pac-Lab, a series of brightly colored walls and pathways designed to mimic a videogame maze in large-scale, which visitors could enter and navigate, was situated on the park’s Prairie du Cercle Nord. Pac-Lab was conceived as a monument suitable for our era, reflecting the constant choices and many paths we navigate daily - whether in a physical space or a virtual reality.

== Personal life ==
Will Ryman, the son of the artists Merrill Wagner and Robert Ryman (1930-2019), lives in New York City with his son, Aiden.
