= Rosinco =

Diesel-powered luxury yacht that sank in Lake Michigan

- Motor yacht Georgiana III at builder's fitting out dock.

History

United States
- Name: Georgiana III (1916—1918); Whitemarsh (1918-1925); Rosinco (1925-1928)
- Owner: William G. Coxe (1916—1917); Edward T. Stotesbury/J. H. R. Cromwell (1917-1918); W. L. Baum (1918-1925); Robert Hosmer Morse (1925-1928)
- Builder: Harlan and Hollingsworth Corporation, Wilmington, Delaware
- Yard number: 3447
- Launched: 20 May 1916
- Completed: 1916
- Maiden voyage: 29 July 1916
- In service: 20 May 1916
- Identification: U.S. Official Number: 214160; Signal: LGCH
- Fate: Sank 19 September 1928

General characteristics
- Type: Patrol vessel
- Tonnage: 82 GRT 44 NRT
- Length: 95 ft (29 m) overall; 93 ft (28 m) between perpendiculars; 88 ft (27 m) registry
- Beam: 15 ft (4.6 m)
- Draft: 5 ft (1.5 m) mean
- Propulsion: 1 240 ihp 4 cyl diesel, single screw
- Speed: 15 kn (17 mph; 28 km/h)
- Complement: 18
- Armament: 2 × 3-pounder guns, 2 × machine gun
- Notes: Though commissioned as a Navy vessel the Navy did not own the yacht. Acquisition 3 May 1917 was by free lease. The vessel was commissioned 11 May 1917 and decommissioned 30 November 1918.
- Rosinco
- U.S. National Register of Historic Places
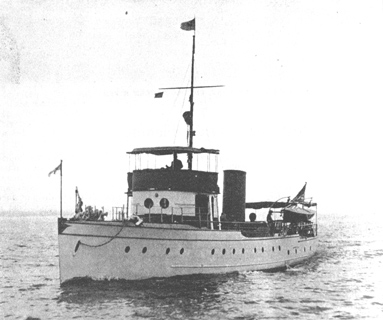

- Location within Wisconsin Location within the United States
- Location: Lake Michigan off the coast of Kenosha, Wisconsin
- Coordinates: 42°37.50′N 087°37.62′W
- Built: 1916
- Architect: Harlan and Hollingsworth; Fairbanks-Morse
- NRHP reference No.: 01000737
- Added to NRHP: July 18, 2001

Rosinco was a diesel-powered luxury yacht that sank in Lake Michigan off the coast of Kenosha, Wisconsin in 1928. The yacht was built in 1916 as Georgiana III and served during World War I as USS Georgiana III, a Section patrol craft, under a free lease to the Navy by her owner and commanding officer. After the war the yacht was sold and renamed Whitemarsh in 1918. In 1925, after sale to Robert Hosmer Morse of Fairbanks-Morse, the yacht became Rosinco. She was sunk following a collision in 1928 and the wreck was added to the National Register of Historic Places in 2001.

== History ==
Originally named Georgiana III, the ship was constructed in 1916 by Harlan and Hollingsworth in Wilmington, Delaware, a 95-foot steel-hulled yacht as the yard's hull number 3447. Uniquely, she was built with a Southwart-Harris diesel engine so that if needed, she could be used for wartime purposes. The 240 hp engine had four cylinders, each 9 inches in diameter, with a 13-inch stroke, and it could be powered up from a cold start in ten seconds - significantly faster than the steam engines then typical on yachts. The engine could go from full ahead to full astern in five seconds. Fuel, of crude or fuel oil, capacity was 1,070 US gal (4,100 L). The propeller was 4 ft (1.2 m) in diameter with a 60 in (1.5 m) pitch. The yacht was equipped with a 3kW electric generator.

The hull was divided into seven watertight compartments by six bulkheads, four of which had watertight doors. The bar keel, with a 0.5 in (1.3 cm) vertical through plate keel merged under the machinery, was 5 in (12.7 cm) by 0.875 in (2.2 cm). The upper decks were narrow planks of white pine fastened from below by brass screws and glued together. They were edged by mahogany margin planks.

Georgiana III, the third yacht for William G. Coxe, the president of the company that built it, was intended for use on the Delaware Bay. The yacht was launched 20 May 1916 at a private event attended by a few friends. At the time the yacht was considered among the finest examples of motor yacht construction. The yacht was registered with U.S. Official Number 214160 and signal of LGCH at Wilmington, Delaware. On 29 July 1916 the yacht left the builder's yard for an initial trip to Cape May, New Jersey and return.

The deckhouse was paneled in mahogany, with a large davenport and card table, and with large plate glass windows for good views. Below decks, the main salon was paneled in oak, with English tapestry for wall panels and upholstery, and with three built-in sofa beds, oak furniture, an 8-person dining table, and two sideboards with glazed and leaded glass. The grand stateroom contained a 3/4 bed, a Pullman bed, two dressing tables, and a bathroom. Georgiana III was listed in the 1916 New York Yacht Club registry with a private signal pennant with a white hen on a blue background.

=== World War I service ===
Prior to the U.S. entry into the war many yachtsmen aspired to serve as Naval auxiliaries and lobbied the government to include them and their yachts in naval planning. The Navy reluctantly created an office to acquire and prepare for acquisition of yachts suitably modified and strengthened to mount weapons and endure hard service. A part of the office's work resulted in yacht designs suitable for military use with some yachtsmen building new yachts to those military suitable designs. Georgiana III incorporated features of those military designs.

During the spring of 1917 Edward T. Stotesbury of Philadelphia, Pennsylvania purchased the yacht from Coxe and turned her over to his stepson, James H. R. Cromwell who was a member of Corinthian Yacht Club of Philadelphia and the U.S. Naval Reserve Force (USNRF).

USS Georgiana III (SP-83) at anchor, circa 1917–1918.

On 3 May 1917, the U.S. Navy acquired the yacht by free lease from her owner, J. H. R. Cromwell for World War I service as a Section patrol vessel. The Navy took control and commissioned the yacht as USS Georgiana III with the designation SP-83 on 11 May 1917. Georgiana III went to Wilmington on 26 May 1917 for conversion into a Section patrol craft by Harlan and Hollingsworth, with the ship being fitted with two 3-pounder (47 mm) guns. After conversion the vessel was assigned to the 4th Naval District.

On 25 July 1917 she reported for harbor entrance patrol duty at Cape May, New Jersey. For the remainder of World War I she patrolled the entrance to Delaware Bay, cruising between Cold Spring Harbor, New Jersey, and Lewes, Delaware. Fitted with underwater listening gear in July 1918, she also escorted ships through the Defensive Sea Area of Delaware Bay.

Georgiana III was decommissioned at Essington, Pennsylvania, on 30 November 1918 and returned to her owner.

=== Postwar ===
In 1918, she was purchased by W. L. Baum of the Chicago Yacht Club and renamed Whitemarsh. (Note: U.S. registry information as late as 1922 does not reflect the ownership change though it does show the name change. The 1923 register contains even more confusing entries. Under the list arranged by call letters, page 111, for call letters LGCH and Whitemarsh the owner is Stotesbury, home port Philadelphia. Under Merchant Motor Vessels, page 301, the entry shows Whitemarsh with home port of New Orleans. A footnote specifies the former name as Georgiana III.) Robert Hosmer Morse of Fairbanks-Morse bought the vessel in 1925 and gave her the name Rosinco. He had the original engine replaced with a Fairbanks-Morse model 35 diesel engine from his own company.

=== Loss ===
In September 1928, Rosinco set off for Milwaukee, Wisconsin from Chicago, Illinois. On the 18th of September, Robert Hosmer Morse left Milwaukee to visit the Fairbanks-Morse plant in Beloit, Wisconsin and Rosinco was to return to Chicago. In the early morning hours of the 19th, Rosinco reportedly struck a raft of sawed wooden beams that ruptured the hull and began sinking rapidly. While all humans aboard survived, the ship's mascot, a canary, did not.

== Wreck site ==
Rosinco sits upright on the bottom of Lake Michigan, 190 feet beneath the surface, embedded in the lake bed, well-preserved in the cold freshwater. Some artifacts have been removed by divers, and the wreck has been snagged by fishnets, but otherwise remains largely intact. The Wisconsin Underwater Archaeology Association has been researching the shipwreck since 1998. Rosinco is held in public trust by the State of Wisconsin and is managed by the Wisconsin Historical Society and the Wisconsin Department of Natural Resources.
