= Terry Fugate-Wilcox =

American painter

Tery Fugate-Wilcox
- 1972 sculpture 3000 A.D. Diffusion Piece in NYC Parks' J. Hood Wright Park.
- Born: Raymond Terry Fugate; November 20, 1944 (age 81); Kalamazoo, Michigan, U.S.
- Known for: Minimalist and Actual Art painter, sculptor; Performance art
- Spouse: Valerie Monroe Shakespeare (m. 1963; died 2011)
- Patrons: National Gallery of Australia, Public Art Fund, Prudential, Lower Manhattan Cultural Council, NYC Parks

Tery Fugate-Wilcox (born 1944) (also known as Terry Fugate-Wilcox before the 1980s when he "donated a surplus r to charity"), is a minimalist and natural-process postminimalist (Actual Art)-ist painter and sculptor best known for three monumental art works in New York City and surrounding region: the LMCC-sponsored Holland Tunnel Wall (dismantled circa 1989), the 3-storey Self-Watering Tetrahedrons fountain located in Prudential's Gateway 4 lobby until 1998, and the permanently installed 36-foot-tall 3000 A.D. Diffusion Piece in J. Hood Wright Park overlooking the George Washington Bridge. The latter is the subject of a New York City official historical sign. The artist is an NEA-laureate with creations in the collections of the Smithsonian Institution, the National Gallery of Australia, NYC Parks, and several museums. His art at times led to tangles with the House Un-American Activities Committee, the New York City Department of Buildings, and magazine "Art in America". He was co-organizer of the Fulcrum Gallery (AKA Fvlcrvm Gallery, AKA Shakespeare's Fvlcrvm) located in the basement of the SoHo Branch of the Guggenheim Museum until both sites closed in 2002 in part due to the economic effects arising from the September 11 attacks on SoHo and TriBeCa.

== Early life ==
According to his own autobiography, It's the Artists' Life for Me!, he was born with the name Raymond Terry Fugate in Kalamazoo, Michigan, and he never met his father (who was KIA during World War II). At age sixteen, Raymond was formally adopted by his stepfather, Dale Wilcox, becoming Raymond Terry Fugate-Wilcox. He attended military schools and some college. His autobiography also says that he married in 1963 to Valerie Monroe Shakespeare who convinced him to drop Raymond from his name; changing his name to Terry Fugate-Wilcox. Fugate-Wilcox and wife moved to New York City in December 1968.

== Work ==
=== Diffusing metal sculptures ===
Consistent with the artist's enthusiasm for the Actual Art concept that time and natural process should be able to change art's appearance, the most recognizable Fugate-Wilcox pieces involve same-sized flat rectangular slabs of chemically sensitive metals which are physically bolted together—with the intent that, over time (an estimated year indicated in the piece's title) the slabs would chemically bond together through diffusion or other means into one solid mass. Such pieces include the National Gallery of Australia's 2,500 A.D. (Cu & Zn), and Cu & C (3500 ad), and also Blue steel & brass (2500 ad) New York City's prominent 1974 outdoor sculpture, 3000 A.D. Diffusion Piece is such a work: in theory, the piece's various aluminum and magnesium slabs will join themselves into one continuous alloy block around the year 3000. (The geo-coordinates of the site of the 3000 A.D. Diffusion Piece are: 40.847283,-73.94205.)

=== Other sculpture ===
Fugate-Wilcox concrete sculptures typically consist of flat slabs of concrete in the elemental polygonal shapes so often favored by minimalist artists. Fugate-Wilcox peppers the exposed surfaces of the still-wet concrete with metallic powder or other substances likely to oxidize or otherwise chemically change with the passage of time, thus changing the surface colors. The artist's Weathering Triangle outdoor sculpture in New York City was meant to feature the changing colors brought about by chemical reactions over time; however, Smithsonian photos show that in fact the surface was usually just covered-over by unauthorized event posters and graffiti. (The piece was also a long-time "litigating triangle" as NY Buildings repeatedly fought to challenge in court the Triangle's erection without permits.)

Some Fugate-Wilcox flat steel creations have involved changes created by blast effects from explosives. The warping and spalling resulting from contact with detonating explosives is used for artistic effect. Fugate-Wilcox also designs lightning-modified art. Some of the artist's creations use furnace-burnt or otherwise deweaponized handguns obtained from municipal gun buyback programs.

Some sculptures have used bundles of vertically installed 2 by 4 lumber which would gradually fan-out slightly from their original rigidly compact vertical formation due to the swelling and warping effects of humidity. According to a 1983 New York Times article, a Fugate-Wilcox warping wood piece called Weathering Wood took advantage of variations in humidity to flex and "flower out" when dry, and then "close back up" when the environment became more humid.

A future sculptural design for which the artist acquired land and started a nonprofit organization to raise funds is his San Andreas Fault Sculpture Project: a proposed 1-acre (4,000 m^{2}) monolith of concrete (20 ft deep (6.1 m)) meant to straddle both sides of the San Andreas Fault so that over time the Earth's own plate-tectonic forces will crack the block into two golden rectangles that will continue to move past each other in opposite directions. The artist's intent would be to use "the Earth itself, as a tool to make the movement of massive continents visible on a scale that can be understood in human terms".

=== Paintings ===
Consistent with the artist's "Actual Art" philosophy, Fugate-Wilcox's abstract paintings often include in their creation, certain natural processes like weathering, rainfall evidence, or oxidation over time; sometimes the natural processes will (on purpose) cause additional colors to appear upon a once-monochromatic surface.

A notable example seen by millions of New York City motorists (during the decade or so it was installed) was the outdoor mural titled Holland Tunnel Wall —a painting larger than the entire facade of the neighboring national parish church Our Lady of Vilnius. located on the multistory parking tower on the northwest corner of Varick and Broome directly in view of vehicles entering the Holland Tunnel. This mural (formerly the site of a megabillboard now gone because the whole building was demolished in November 2015) at first appeared all white until, over time, it became ever more colorful as layers of water-soluble paint weathered away by rain revealed the artist's pigmented underlayers. The artist's intention was to use paints that were incompatible with each other, so that as the work weathered, different colors would emerge. The first layer was red epoxy paint; the second layer, yellow latex; the third layer was blue oil-based alkyd; the fourth layer was green-pigmented shellac, and the fifth (final) layer was whitewash of white water-soluble casein paint. (The geo-coordinates of the former site of the Holland Tunnel Wall mural are: 40.724455, -74.006305.)

=== Performance art ===
In an art prank which "Art in America" called "the conceptual artwork that ended conceptual art", in 1970 Fugate-Wilcox and wife picked a nonexistent address on 57th Street (then the center of the New York art world) and created the fictitious Jean Freeman Gallery. Like other significant galleries, the (secretly non-existent) Jean Freeman Gallery advertised in "Art in America"—but the advertising bills, mailed to the fake address, went unpaid. At the end of the 1970 art season, Fugate-Wilcox published an announcement from the Jean Freeman Gallery saying: "26 West 57th Street does not exist". An early 1971 New York Times article by Grace Glueck called "The Non Gallery of No Art" announced in public the story of Jean Freeman Gallery. In a televised appearance with Fugate-Wilcox on the "Today" show, "Art in America"'s Brian O'Doherty announced that the magazine would "donate" the costs of the unpaid advertising bills, and then discussed on-air the non-gallery as a conceptual artwork with Fugate-Wilcox and the show host.

In 1971, Terry Fugate-Wilcox donated a "surplus letter R" from his first name during a fundraiser for the Irish independence cause, thus going from Terry to Tery (still pronounced like "Terry"). Shortly afterward, "Art in America"'s Brian O'Doherty changed his name to "Patrick Ireland" in support of the same cause.

Also in 1971, Tery and his wife, Valerie submitted nude passport photos. Although the photos were taken from the shoulders up, the couple was refused passports and sparked an investigation by the House Un-American Activities Committee's new investigative branch called the Internal Security Commission.

At one point, Fugate-Wilcox and his wife, Valerie, found a lawyer willing to help them file for a "Conceptual Divorce" in which Mrs. Fugate-Wilcox would reclaim her maiden name to become Valerie Shakespeare; thereafter, couple would continue as before.

== Gallery ==
Various archive photos and artist conception composite images

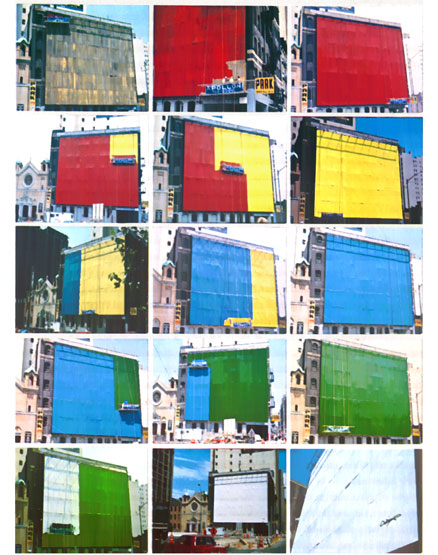
In-process photos of the application of various paint-layers on the Holland Tunnel Wall weathering mural.

Artist's conception image of the Weathering Triangle showing color changes caused by weather-induced oxidation of metal powders embedded in the sculpture's cement surface.

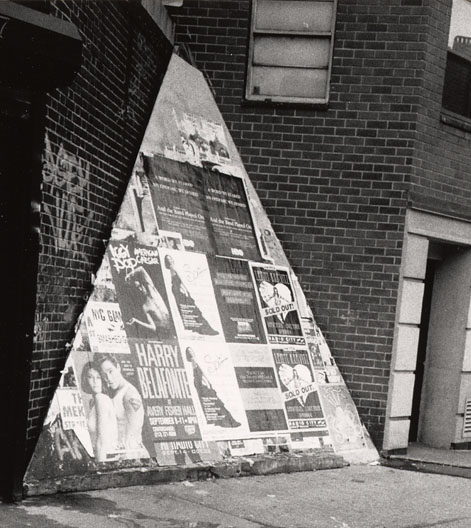
Smithsonian archive photo shows the unintended reality of Weathering Triangle as installed in Greenwich Village – covered over with unauthorized event posters and graffiti tags.

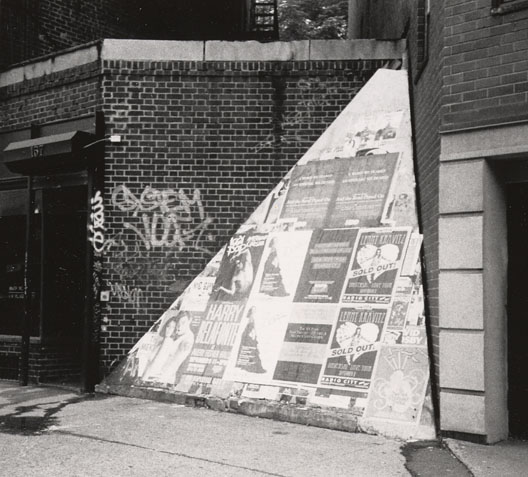
Another Smithsonian archive photo of Fugate-Wilcox's Weathering Triangle.

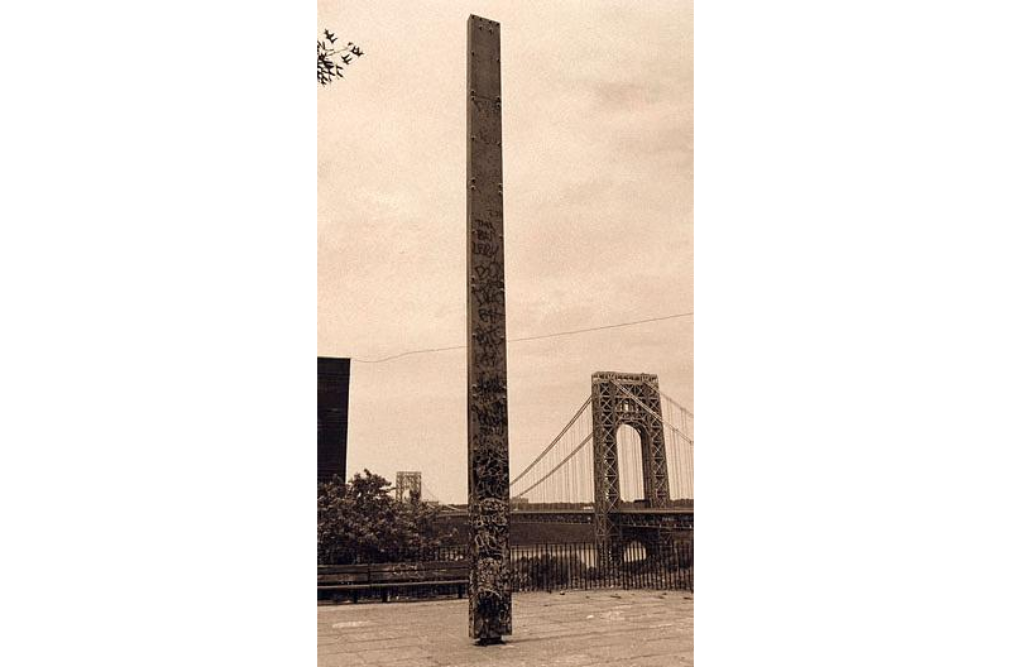
Smithsonian archive photo of the artist's monumental 3000 A.D. Diffusion Piece covered with graffiti in New York City.

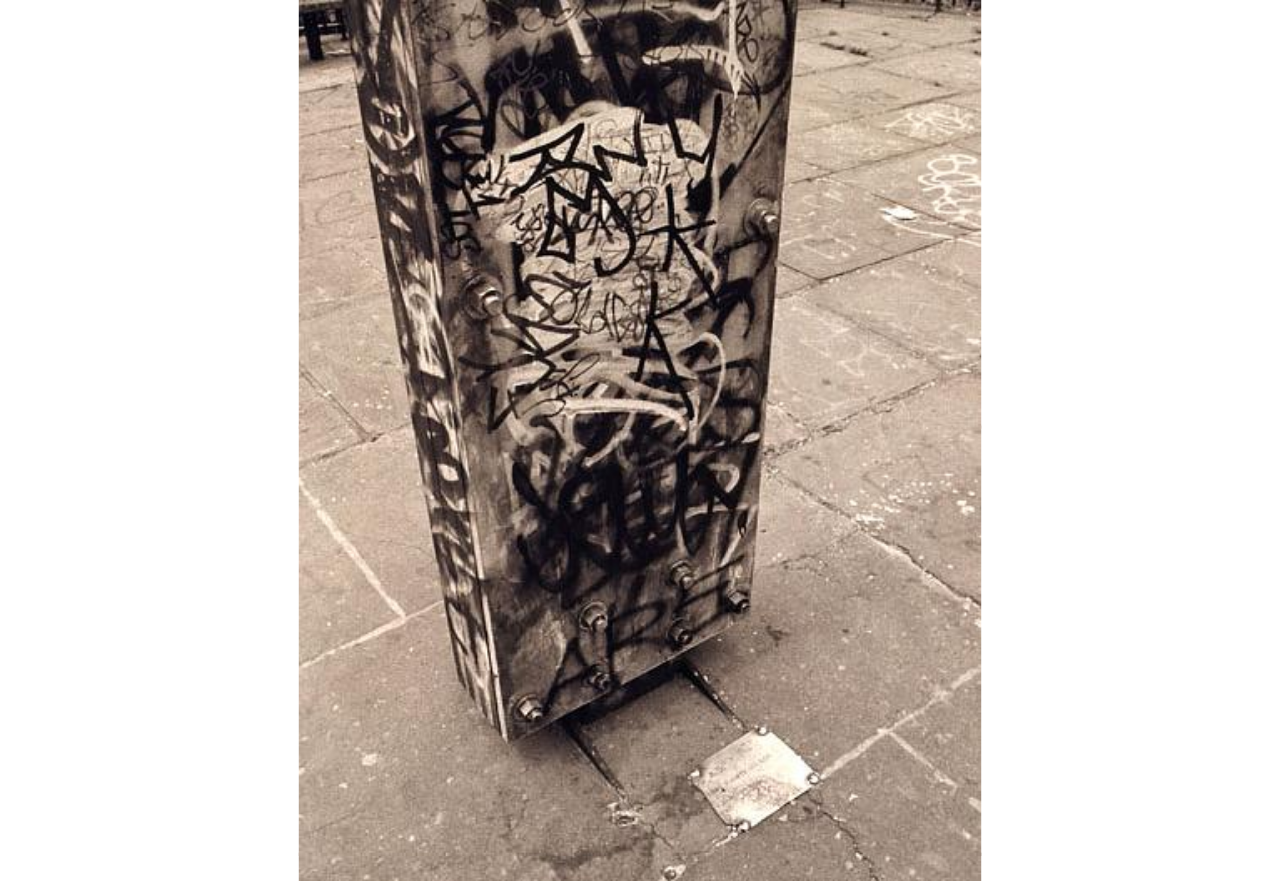
Detail view showing the extent at one time of the graffiti vandalism.

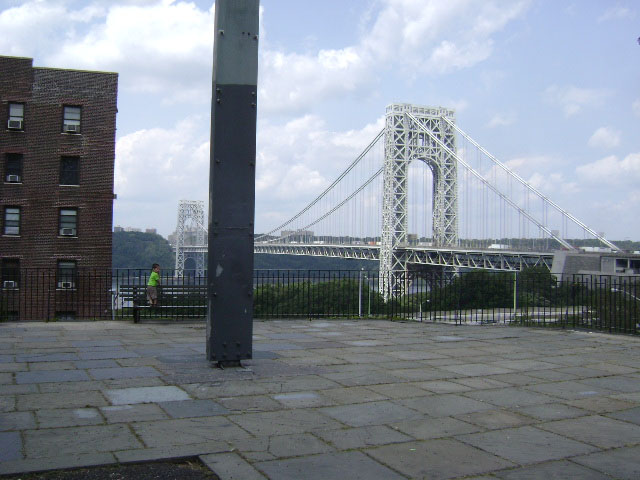
The same sculpture, after graffiti abatement care. (Photo by New York City Department of Parks and Recreation)

Artist's conception of the Prudential lobby fountain, Self-watering Tetrahedrons.

Artist's conception of the planned San Andreas Fault Sculpture Project showing the one-acre slab as it might look after having been (purposefully) cracked into two offset halves by tectonic forces.
