= Yampa (yacht) =

American yacht

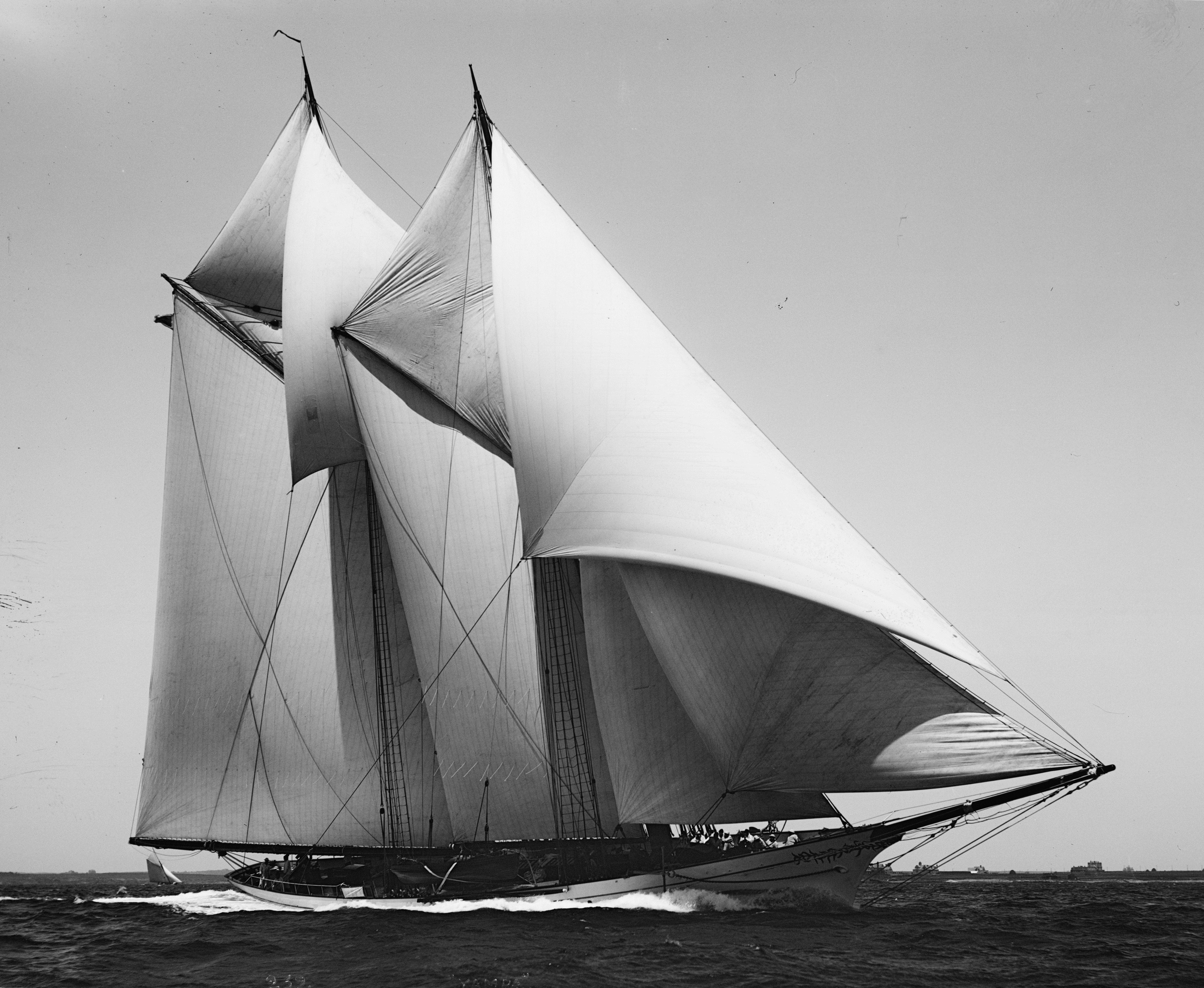
- The Yampa in 1893
- Yacht club: New York Yacht Club
- Nation: United States
- Designer(s): Archibald Cary Smith
- Builder: Harlan & Hollingsworth
- Owner(s): Chester W. Chapin, Richard Suydam Palmer, Kaiser Wilhelm II

Specifications
- Length: 135 ft (41 m)
- Beam: 27 ft (8.2 m)
- Draft: 13.8 ft (4.2 m)

The Yampa was an American ocean-going cruising schooner yacht for pleasure use from 1887 to 1899. The yacht was originally built for Chester W. Chapin, a rail baron and U.S. Congressman from Massachusetts. It completed several ocean cruises with no accidents. It passed through several hands and ultimately was purchased by Kaiser Wilhelm II of Germany as a birthday present for his wife. He had another larger yacht built based on the design of the Yampa, which was named the Meteor.

== History ==
The Yampa was a yacht originally designed by naval architect Archibald Cary Smith for Chester W. Chapin, and the steel-keeled schooner was constructed in 1887 by the firm Harlan and Hollingsworth in Wilmington, Delaware, four years after Chapin died. She was considered the best in her class until 1891. The Yampa was 135 ft (41 m) overall, 110 ft (34 m) at the water line, and her draft was 13.8 ft (4.2 m). She had a registered tonnage of 162 tons net and 170 gross, with a beam of 27 ft (8.2 m). She participated in various events related to the America's Cup, a trophy award for best in a match race between two sailing yachts of different countries.

American banker James Hood Wright used the Yampa for pleasure cruising in the summer of 1894. Chapin sold her that November to Richard Suydam Palmer who had memberships in various yacht clubs, and he refitted her in December 1894. The Yampa sailed for Gibraltar on January 18, 1895, and from there she went to Tunis and Algiers in Africa. She then sailed to Malta and other ports in the Mediterranean Sea. She made several ocean cruises from 1894 through 1895 with no significant accidents, and sailors referred to this as "sea-kindliness." In February 1896, Palmer traveled with the Yampa for three months to the West Indies, stopping at Bermuda, Barbados, Trinidad, St. Thomas, and Nassau. Cuthbert S. Thompson, who was a cousin of Palmer, committed suicide in Bermuda aboard the yacht while Palmer's guest in March on the West Indies trip.

Palmer took her to Southampton in England in 1897 on the occasion of Queen Victoria's Diamond Jubilee. From there, he went through the North Sea and was towed to Kiel, Germany by way of the Kiel Canal. There the yacht anchored close to the German Emperor's yacht SMY Hohenzollern. The emperor liked the schooner and sought to purchase it. Palmer had left his business card on the SMY Hohenzollern and was informed that the emperor talked all day about how he liked the American vessel. The emperor immediately then took steps to acquire her for himself, and bought the yacht from Palmer in December 1897. The schooner was a birthday present for his wife Augusta Victoria of Schleswig-Holstein. The ship went to Southampton to be refitted to the emperor's luxurious specifications. The German Royal family took many cruises on the Yampa which carried the Empress's flag; she was renamed Iduna and participated in several European regattas. In 1898, she competed in the international Emperor’s Cup regatta. That same year, she was outfitted to race against the schooner Rainbow.

The emperor had another yacht built based on the design of the Yampa, using Smith as the naval architect, and he had the yacht constructed in America instead of Germany. The new vessel Meteor III was an enlarged and improved version of the Yampa, and was the end result of a sequence of previous vessels designed and built by Smith. Meteor III was built in New York harbor in 1902, and christened by Alice Roosevelt Longworth, the daughter of President Theodore Roosevelt. When the Meteor III was ordered in 1901 the Iduna, previously the Yampa, became the property of the emperor's wife. The Iduna participated in various races into 1909. The Induna and the Meteor III were sold in the early part of 1920 and the proceeds as a wedding present went to German crown prince Wilhelm, the heir to Kaiser Wilhelm II.

== Sources ==
- Hallock, Charles (March 8, 1902). German Emperor's New Schooner. Forest and Stream Publishing Company.
- Kenealy, A.J. (1902). Sleicher, John Albert (ed.). Kaiser William's New Yacht. F. Leslie.
- Koesling, Theo-Peter (April 2012). Amphitrite (in German). Bremen: BoD – Books on Demand. ISBN 978-3-95427-067-5.
- Leslie, Frank (1901). An Imperial American Yacht. Vol. 53. Frank Leslie Publishing House. p. 540. "... the Emperor desired an American ..."
- McCormick, L. M. (1898). Emperor William's American Yacht. Illustrated American Publishing Company.
- Navy and Army (May 20, 1905). Under the Burgee.
- Outing (1898). Yachting. Outing Publishing Company. "The German Emperor saw the American schooner Yampa last summer in the Baltic, and fell in love with her. The result was that he purchased her from Mr. R. S. Palmer""
- SA (March 1, 1902). The Emperor's Yacht – Meteor III. Vol. 86. Scientific American, Incorporated. ""Meteor III.," which was designed by Cary Smith & Barbey, of New York, is an improved and enlarged "Yampa"—the latter, a very successful schooner that was designed by Mr. Smith and spent a great deal of her time in European waters. The "Yampa" eventually passed into the hands of the German Emperor, and under the name of "Iduna" has figured largely in the foreign regattas. The Emperor was so well pleased with the "Iduna" that last fall he placed an order with these architects for the construction of a larger and faster yacht, which should embody the best features of the "Yampa""
- Seitz, Sharon; Miller, Stuart (2011). "Prall's Island, Shooter's Island, and Isle of Meadow". Other Islands of New York City: A History and Guide. Countryman Press. p. 319. ISBN 978-1-5815-7886-7.
- Stephens, W.P. (1902). Bigelow, Poultney (ed.). "The Yachting Outlook". Outing. Outing Publishing Company. "The noble schooner yacht, Meteor III, just launched at Shooters' Island, in Newark Bay, is the legitimate outcome of a practical study of the American schooner, begun by Mr. Smith in Prospero as long ago as 1877. She is largely a bigger and finer edition of the ocean cruiser Yampa, designed by him in 1887, and now owned by the Emperor under the name of Iduna."
- Thompson, Winfield M. (1907). "Royal Yachts and Yachtsmen". In Day, Thomas Fleming (ed.). The Rudder, Volume XVIII. New York: The Rudder Publishing Company. p. 435.
- White, Trumbull (1902). The German Emperor's American Yacht. Trumbull White.
