= Harlan and Hollingsworth =

Ship and railroad car builder in Wilmington, Delaware

Coordinates: 39°44′13.26″N 75°33′25.68″W

Harlan & Hollingsworth
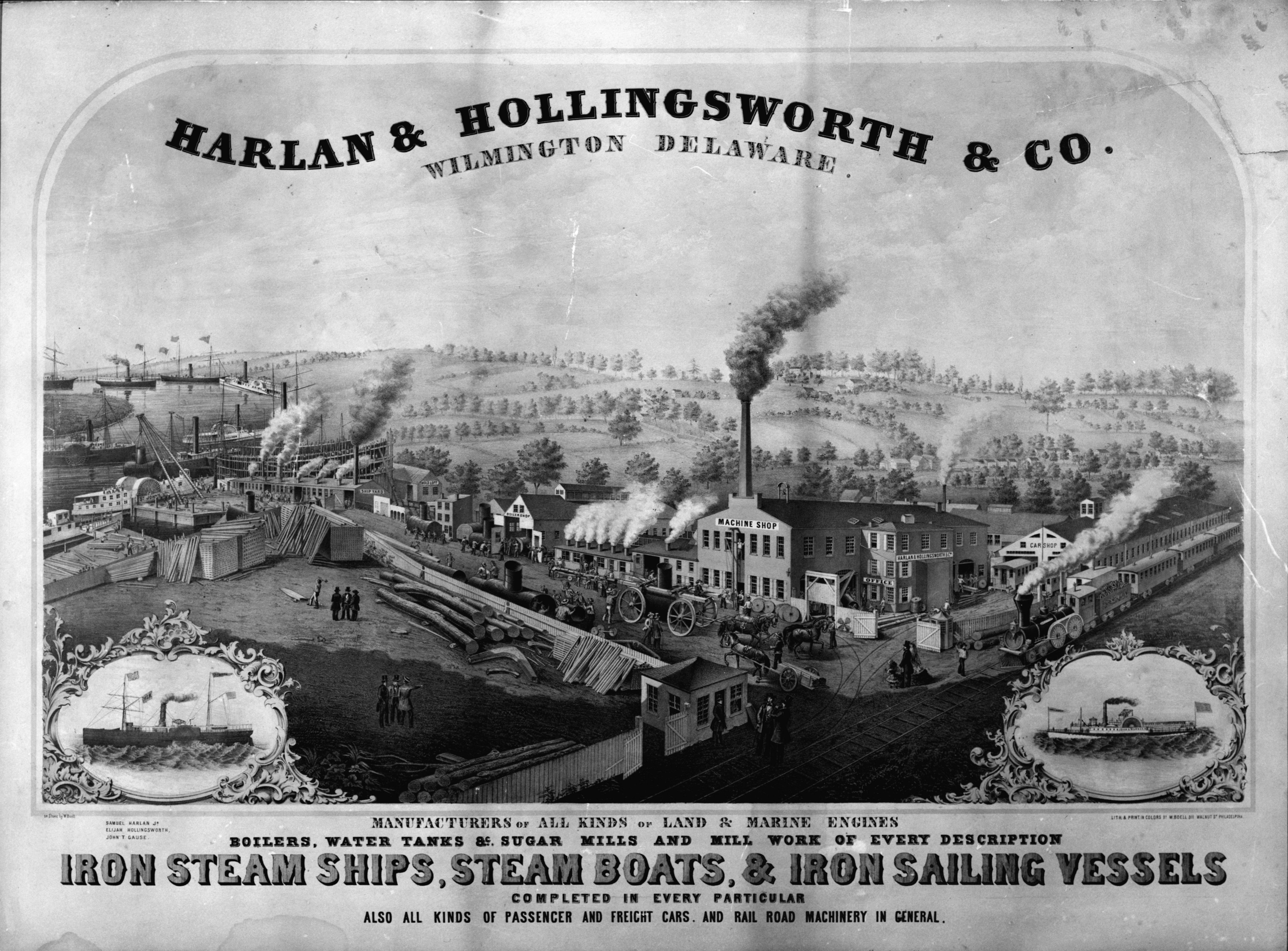
- Type: Private
- Predecessor: None
- Founded: 1837 (as Betts, Pusey and Harlan)
- Founder: Mahlon Betts, Samuel Pusey, Samuel Harlan
- Defunct: 1904
- Successor: Bethlehem Steel
- Headquarters: Wilmington, Delaware, USA
- Products: Iron ships and ship-related machinery, wooden railroad cars, sugar refining equipment
- Revenue: $580,000 (1860)

Harlan & Hollingsworth was a Wilmington, Delaware, manufacturing firm that built railroad cars and became one of the first iron shipyards in the United States. It operated under various names from 1837 to 1904, when it was purchased by Bethlehem Steel.

== Founding ==
Mahlon Betts, a carpenter, arrived in Wilmington in 1812. After helping construct many prominent buildings in the city, Betts branched out into foundry work in 1821. In 1836, Betts partnered with Samuel Pusey (a machinist) and began manufacturing railcars at a plant on West and Water Streets in Wilmington. The next year, cabinetmaker Samuel Harlan joined the firm, then known as Betts, Pusey & Harlan. By 1839, the company claimed to have manufactured 39 passenger and 28 freight cars over the previous two years. The next year, they hired Jacob F. Sharp, a former house carpenter, to build railroad cars. He would rise to become foreman at the plant, and eventually co-founded the rival firm of Jackson and Sharp.

In 1841, Elijah Hollingsworth, brother-in-law of Harlan, bought out Pusey, and the firm became known as Betts, Harlan & Hollingsworth. Pusey later formed competing Pusey and Jones. In 1849 Mahlon Betts withdrew from the firm, which became simply Harlan & Hollingsworth; J. Taylor Gause was admitted as a partner in 1858, and the company became known as Harlan, Hollingsworth & Co.

== Shipbuilding ==
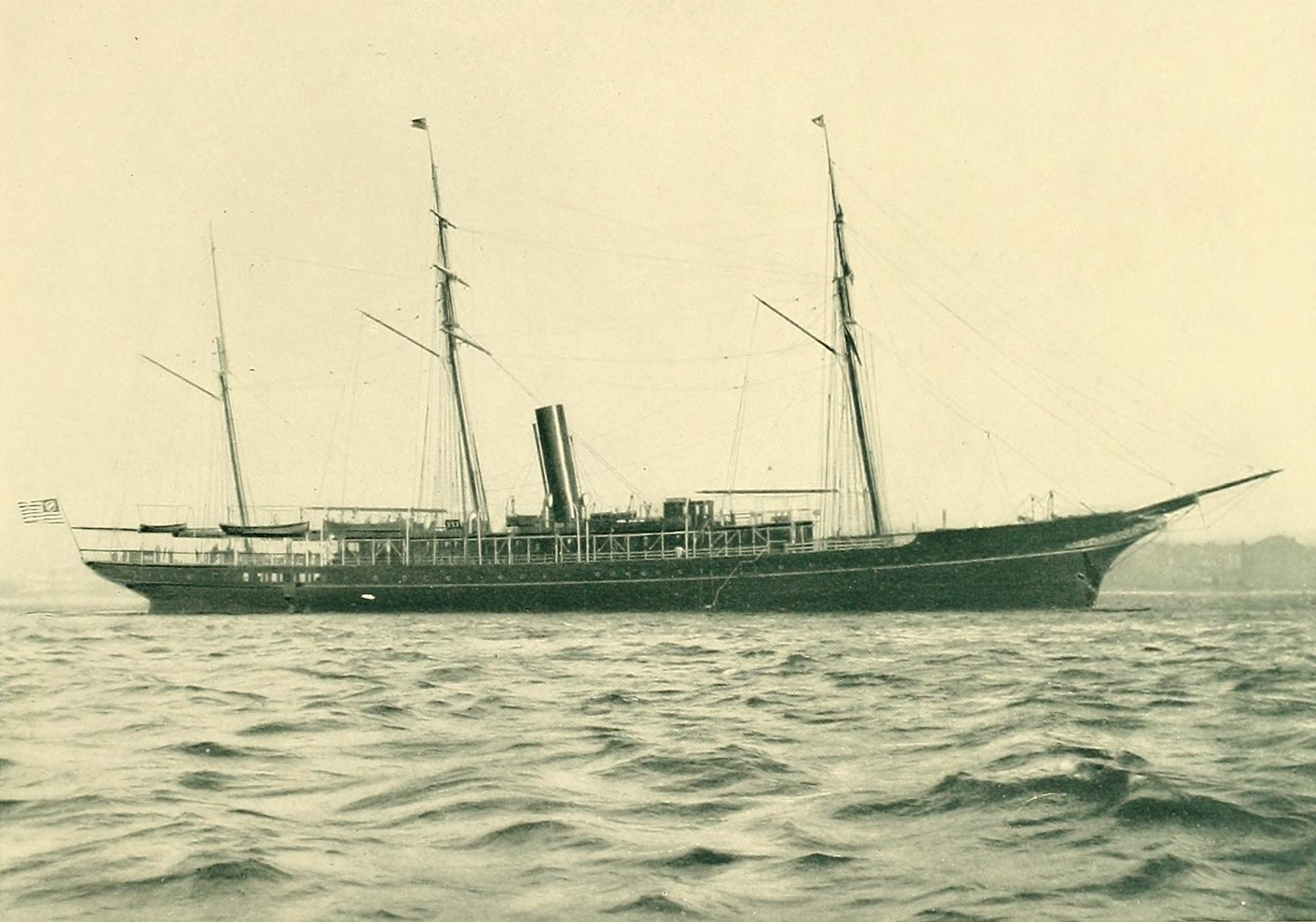
The 1898 steam yacht Niagara, built for Howard Gould.

Harlan & Hollingsworth's experience with railcars and other ironwork led them to early experiments in iron shipbuilding. In 1842, the company hired Alexander Kelly to supervise its millwright work. In 1843, at Harlan's encouragement, the company began to build and repair marine engines. Their first ship-related project was repairing the cylinder and other machine parts of the steamboat Sun.

The firm expanded slowly but steadily into iron shipbuilding: it would build nine ships between 1841 and 1851, alongside its railroad-car production and general repair work. In 1843, the company leased a launching berth on the banks of the Christiana River. The facilities at this property were limited, so all the work forming iron plates, bars, and fasteners was done at their main shop on Front and West Streets. The launch slipway was 200 feet long and could only accommodate vessels up to of 600 tons, but this was deemed adequate for the needs of the time.

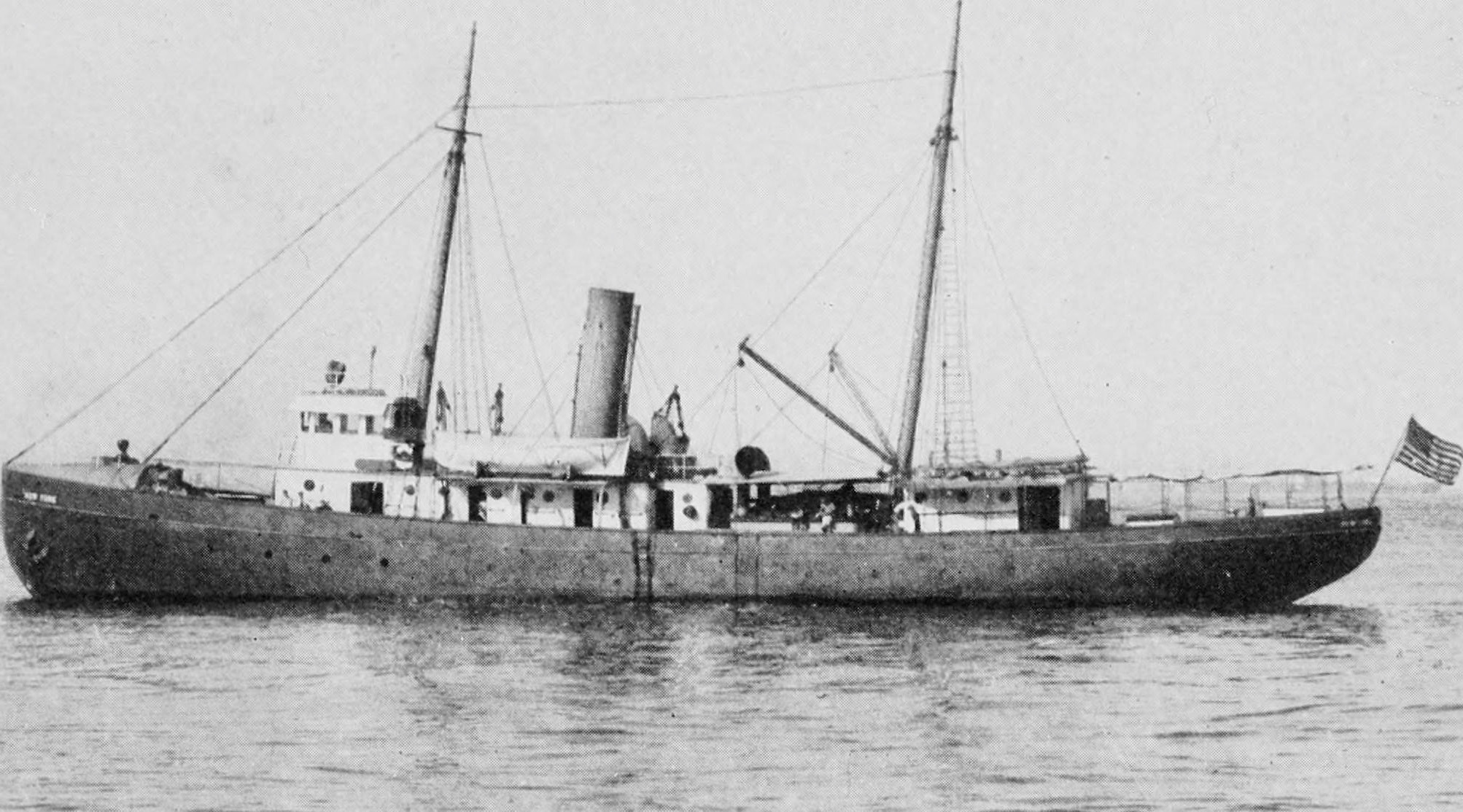
Steam Pilot Boat New York.

The first two hulls built by the company, the Ashland and Ocean, were two of the earliest iron steamboats to be constructed in the United States. They were delivered to George Aspinwall of Philadelphia in 1844. That same year the company built the Bangor, the first seagoing iron propeller steamship built in the United States. In 1897, the company designed the first steam pilot boat in the New York harbor, the New York.

By the early 1850s, the company began to rely less on wood ship or railcar building for its revenue. Machine shops, office buildings, wharves, carpenter sheds, boiler shops, blacksmith shops and cranes were added in the first five years of the decade. As the firm's reputation grew, more orders for steamboats came in from across the country. Charles Morgan, a New York shipping magnate, purchased his first ship from Harlan in 1856. Morgan would eventually become one of the largest customers for Harlan & Hollingsworth, ordering more than 31 vessels by 1878.

Year	Employees	Gross revenue
1836	20	$6,580
1838	45	$63,374
1842	120	$40,531
1850	225	$159,742
1855	280	$293,662
1860	630	$580,427

(Society of Naval Architects, 1943)

=== Civil War ===
By the time of the American Civil War, Harlan and Hollingsworth was the dominant iron shipbuilder in Wilmington, and the most prolific in the United States. By 1860, the company had built 75 iron hulls—mostly steamships plus a handful of barges. (Brown, 1951) During the Civil War, the company won contracts to build three monitors for the U.S. Navy: Patapsco, Saugus, and Napa. The Navy, however, ordered many last-minute changes to these vessels, which delayed their completion and ate into the profits of the firm, which became reluctant to bid on further government contracts.

In 1863, Jacob Sharp left their employ to form Jackson & Sharp, another car-building firm, with Job Jackson.

== Postwar ==
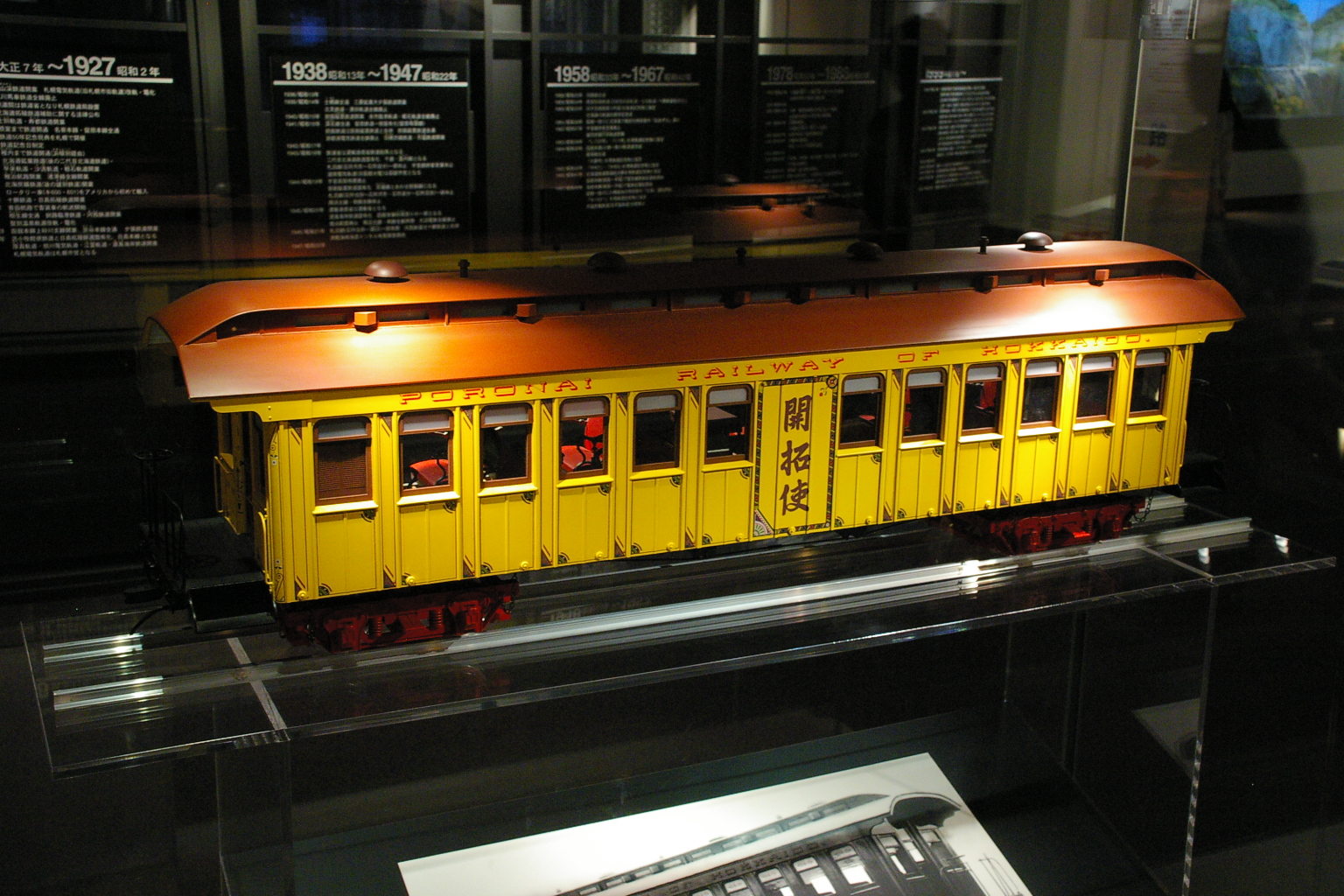
A model of 1880 Horonai Railway's Private car Kaitakushi-gou. (Otaru-shi general museum Otaru, Hokkaido)

In 1866, Elijah Hollingsworth died in a shipyard accident. His death greatly affected Samuel Harlan, so that shortly thereafter the partnership was dissolved and the enterprise incorporated as The Harlan & Hollingsworth Company. Harlan & Hollingsworth thrived despite competition from Jackson & Sharp and other Wilmington yards, in part because of their diversified production of railroad car building and shipbuilding. However, the Panic of 1873 and the death of Charles Morgan, their largest customer, induced the company to seek government contracts again. These included the construction of the sloop Ranger and the 16-year construction of the "New Navy'' monitor USS Amphitrite (BM-2). Despite this experience Harlan & Hollingsworth constructed three more torpedo boat destroyers for the Navy, the Stringham, Hull, and Hopkins.

Other notable vessels built by Harlan & Hollingsworth include Mischief, winner of the fourth America's Cup in 1881. Another notable vessel they built in 1887 was the Yampa, which lead to other ships built for the German Emperor Wilhelm II.

Important clients included Elbridge Thomas Gerry who commissioned the SY Electra in 1884 and William Astor who commissioned the SY Nourmahal in the same year. In 1885 William Vanderbilt commissioned the SY Alva (designed by St Clare John Byrne).

The company followed Jackson & Sharp into narrow-gauge railcar building, but were not in the forefront of steel car construction. In the 1880s orders for ferries and coastal steamships started picking up again, so much that by the end of the 19th century, the company was the largest employer in Wilmington. In 1896 and 1897, they built the Catawissa; it was listed on the National Register of Historic Places in 1996. In 1898 they built the 1448 ton steam yacht 'Niagara', designed by W.G. Shackford, for wealthy client Howard Gould. This was put to use by the US Navy in both world wars.

Also on the National Register is the Rosinco, built by Harlan and Hollingsworth in 1916.

=== Bethlehem Steel era ===
On December 10, 1904, the company was acquired by Bethlehem Steel, which operated it as a division called the Harlan Plant and later, Bethlehem Wilmington. It was a mid-range player in the World War I shipping boom, producing 153,810 dead weight tons of steel merchant ships produced for the United States Shipping Board. The shipyard closed in 1926, although it was reopened for a time during World War II and part of the shipyard was used by the Dravo Corporation until 1964. Railcars were built on the site until 1940, and parts for railroad cars until 1944. Most of the company's buildings have been demolished for new development, but the office building survives and was added to the National Register of Historic Places in 1979.

Ship	Launched	Owner	Type	Notes
Delaware	15 Dec 06	Clyde Line	2-mast schooner, 267x40ft, 1800 cargo tons, 2775 displ., 2 scotch boilers, 3-exp, 12kn	2 ordered June 6.
Pawnee			sister to Delaware	

== Sources ==
- Bigelow, Poultney (1902). Outing. Outing Publishing Company.
- Leslie, Frank (1901). The American Magazine, Volume 53. Frank Leslie Publishing House.
- SA (1902). Scientific American. Scientific American, Incorporated.
