= J. Hood Wright Park =

Public park in Manhattan, New York

Coordinates: 40°50′48″N 73°56′29″W

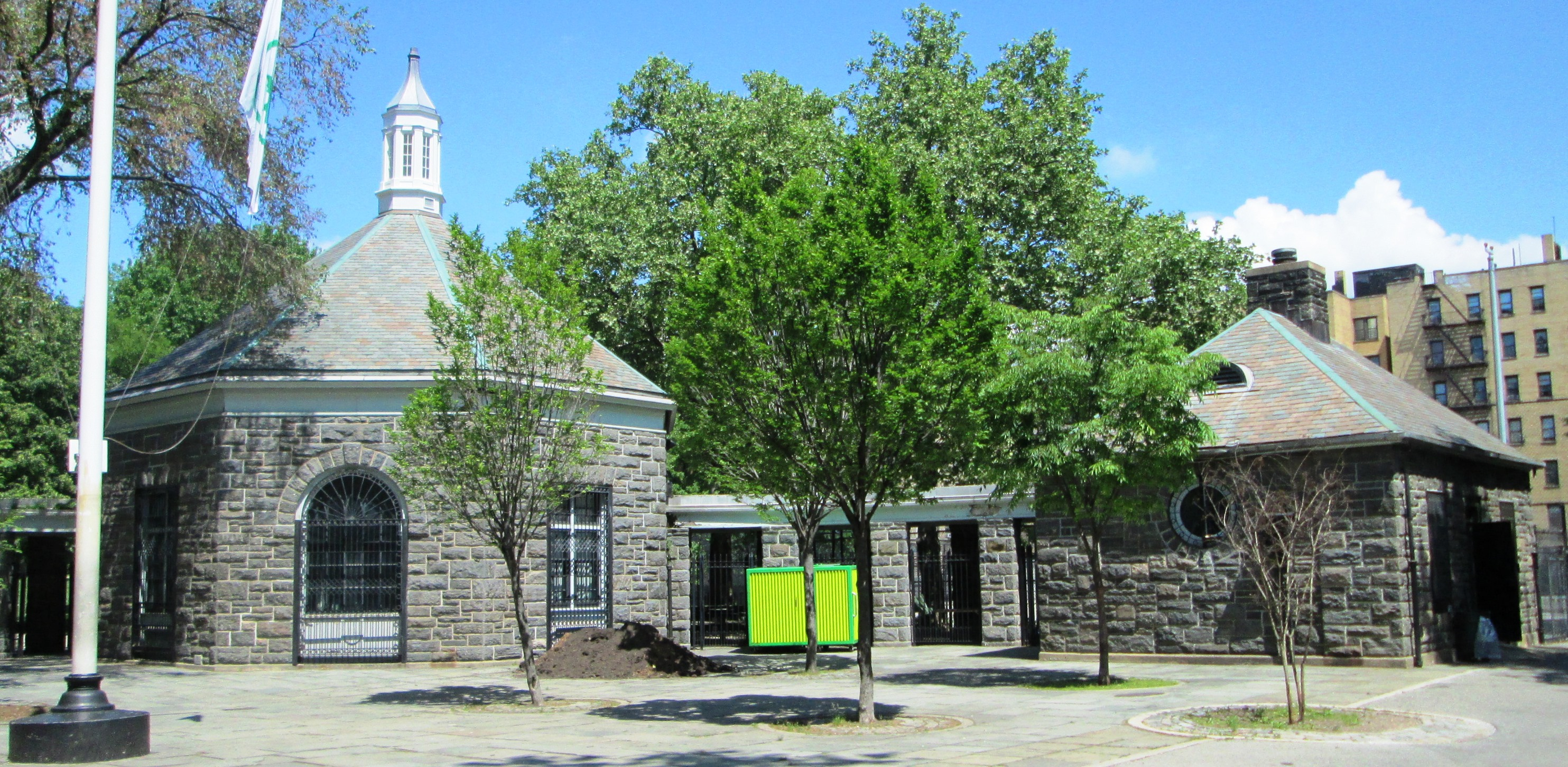
The Recreation Center in J. Hood Wright Park

J. Hood Wright Park is a park of the New York City Department of Parks and Recreation which is located between Fort Washington and Haven Avenue, and between West 173rd and 176th Streets in the Washington Heights neighborhood of Manhattan, New York City. The 6.7 acres (2.7 ha) park includes a playground – which features a model of the nearby George Washington Bridge, which is visible from the park, basketball courts, ballfields, and a recreation center, as well as a dog walk, a cave in the natural rock formations which form the park's western boundary, and an installation of a piece of modern sculpture, "3000 AD Diffussion Piece" by Terry Fugate-Wilcox.

The park is named for the man who formerly owned the site, J. Hood Wright (1836-1894), a banker, financier and philanthropist born in Philadelphia, who lived in a mansion on 175th Street and Haven Avenue. Wright anonymously gave money to convert the local subscription library into a free library which became a branch of the New York Public Library.

The city acquired the land by eminent domain in 1925, specifically to build a park, which the neighborhood was lacking in. It has been upgraded and renovated, and the cupola of the hexagonal recreation center was restored in 2013. The park is supported by the Friends of J. Hood Wright Park, a neighborhood organization.
