= Robert Ryman =

American painter (1930–2019)

- Robert Ryman
- Born: May 30, 1930; Nashville, Tennessee, U.S.
- Died: February 8, 2019 (aged 88); New York City, U.S.
- Known for: Painting, Conceptual art
- Spouses: Lucy Lippard (m. 1960; div. 1966); Merrill Wagner (m. 1969)

Robert Ryman (May 30, 1930 – February 8, 2019) was an American painter identified with the movements of monochrome painting, minimalism, and conceptual art. He was best known for abstract, white-on-white paintings. He lived and worked in New York City.

== Life and career ==
Ryman was born in Nashville, Tennessee. After studying saxophone at the Tennessee Polytechnic Institute in Cookeville, between 1948 and 1949, and at the George Peabody College for Teachers between 1949 and 1950, Ryman enlisted in the United States army reserve corps and was assigned to an army reserve band during the Korean War. Ryman moved to New York City in 1953, intending to become a professional jazz saxophonist. He had lessons with pianist Lennie Tristano, which later informed his painting. At that time he was renting a room in the home of a Russian cello player. Ryman soon took a day job at the Museum of Modern Art as a security guard to make ends meet, and met the artists Sol LeWitt and Dan Flavin, who were co-workers with him at MoMA. Captivated by the newly acquired abstract expressionist works of Mark Rothko, Willem de Kooning, Clyfford Still, Jackson Pollock and Barnett Newman, Ryman became curious about the act of painting. From 1953 to 1960, he worked at the MoMA as a guard in order to be close to painting. He purchased some art supplies at a local store and began experimenting in his apartment in 1953.

Ryman had a close relationship with the conservator Orrin Riley, who would frequently give him advice on archival materials, many times testing the acidity of media the artist was interested in using. He was interviewed by the television writer and producer Barbaralee Diamonstein twice, once for the book and video production Inside New York's Art World in 1979 and again for Inside the Art World in 1994.

In 2009 he participated in the art project Find Me, by Gema Alava, in company of artists Lawrence Weiner, Merrill Wagner and Paul Kos.

His most famous quote is "There is never any question of what to paint only how to paint."

In 1961 the artist married art historian Lucy Lippard. They had a son together, Ethan Ryman, in 1964, who was first a sound engineer and now an artist. The marriage ended in divorce. In 1969 he married artist Merrill Wagner. Robert Ryman's sons from his second marriage, Cordy Ryman and Will Ryman, are also artists and currently work in New York City.

Ryman died on February 8, 2019, at the age of 88.

== Work ==
=== Painting ===
Ryman was often classified as a minimalist, but he preferred to be known as a "realist", explaining he was not interested in creating illusions, but only in presenting the materials he used in compositions at their face value. As he wrote in a statement for a 2010 exhibition at Pace Wildenstein, "I am not a picture painter. I work with real light and space, and since real light is an important aspect of the paintings, it always presents some problems." The majority of his works feature abstract expressionist-influenced brushwork in white or off-white paint on square canvas or metal surfaces. A lifelong experimenter with media, Ryman painted and/or drew on canvas, linen, steel, aluminum, plexiglas, lumasite, vinyl, fiberglass, corrugated paper, burlap, newsprint, wallpaper, jute sacking, fiberplate, a composite material called gator board, feather board, handmade paper, and acrilivin. He used painted and/or drew with oil, acrylic, encaustic, Lascaux acrylic, casein, enamel, pastel, oil pastel, graphite, gouache, and enamelac.

By the time Ryman began working, older artists like Barnett Newman, Mark Rothko, and Philip Guston had already reduced painting to its essences. In 1955 Ryman began what he considered to be his earliest professional work, a largely monochrome painting titled Orange Painting (1955–59). In 1968-69 he created his Classico series of compositions consisting of multi-panel paintings on a specific type of paper called Classico. For each work in the series, Ryman attached a configuration of heavy, creamy white sheets of the paper to a wall with masking tape, painted the sheets with a shiny white acrylic paint, removed the tape when the sheets were dry, mounted them on foamcore, and reattached them to the wall. The built-up paint edge tracing the outline of masking tape and the ripped paper left behind give witness to the process of creation. The various works in the Classico series differ in the organization of paper sheets, the configuration of tape traces, and the painted shape. Just as the Classico works were titled after the type of paper used as a medium, the so-called Surface Veil works from 1970 were named for the brand of fiberglass upon which the smaller pieces in this group were painted. Some of the 12-foot square paintings from the series were executed not on fiberglass but on cotton or linen. In each of these works the pigment appears to form a membrane over the support due to the differing degrees of opacity and translucence in the white paint juxtaposed with areas where less of it has been applied, leaving the fabric exposed. These disruptions in the painting’s skin often mark the literal pauses between the artist’s working sessions.

From around 1975 until 2003, Ryman often affixed his paintings to the wall with metal brackets. He would design each set of brackets specifically for each piece and have them constructed by a local metals fabricator.

=== Prints and Drawings ===
Robert Ryman, First Conversion, 2003, Relief print from linoleum and felt, graphite, and two steel tacks on aluminum panel, 13½ x 13½ inches

Although Ryman is most known for his paintings, he also experimented with printmaking creating etchings, aquatints, lithographs, silkscreens and relief prints. Like his paintings, his prints are readily identifiable by their predominantly square monochromatic surfaces exploring the values, textures and effects of various whites and other colors printed on paper and aluminum.

His prints and works on paper have not yet been given the same attention, but his approach to making prints and drawings is the same. Working with the particular characteristics of each medium and process, Ryman, from 1969 onwards, explored new territory of making editions, all with a minimum of materials. In his printmaking, Ryman sought to control the texture of his surfaces in ways that he would continue to explore for the rest of his career. As in his paintings, his prints require viewers to pay attention, look closely and observe subtleties. Ryman’s prints both challenge a viewer and reward close looking.

He stated that his titles were meaningless, and that they only existed as a form of identification. Ryman actually preferred the term of "name" for an artwork instead of a title because he was not creating a picture or making reference to anything except the media and the materials. The "names" of his works often come from the names of art supplies, companies, or are just general words that do not carry specific connotation.

== Exhibitions ==
Ryman had his first solo show at the Paul Bianchini Gallery in New York City in 1967 at the age of 36. His first show in Europe came the following year at the Galerie Heiner Friedrich, Munich. One year later, Ryman was included in When Attitudes Become Form, a seminal exhibition of works by Minimalist and Conceptual artists organized by the Kunsthalle Bern. His first solo show at a museum was in 1972 at the Guggenheim Museum in New York City, displaying thirty-eight of Ryman’s works from 1965 to 1971. Ryman's works were represented in documentas 5 (1972), 6 (1977), and 7 (1982), in Kassel, in the Venice Biennale (1976, 1978, 1980 and 2007), and in the Whitney Biennial (1977, 1987, 1995). His first retrospective was organized by the Stedelijk Museum, Amsterdam, in 1974. He was included in five shows at the Daniel Weinberg Gallery, including two solo exhibitions: Robert Ryman: Recent Paintings (1984) and Robert Ryman: Recent Painting (1994). In 1993-94, the largest retrospective to date of Ryman's paintings, curated by Robert Storr, was exhibited at the Tate Gallery, Museo Nacional Centro de Arte Reina Sofia in Madrid, the Museum of Modern Art in New York, the San Francisco Museum of Modern Art, and the Walker Art Center in Minneapolis. In 2010 The Phillips Collection exhibited Robert Ryman: Variations and Improvisations; the catalog was written by Vesela Sretenović.

== Collections ==
The Hallen für Neue Kunst, a former contemporary art museum in Schaffhausen, Switzerland (closed in 2014) had the largest public collection of Ryman's work, permanently exhibiting 29 pieces created from 1959 to 2007. In 2008 Ryman undertook a major reinstallation of his galleries at Hallen für Neue Kunst. Returning to the museum in 2008 — for the first time in 12 years — to revisit the permanent exhibition of his work that was first installed in 1983, he decided to transform the galleries into a “Gesamtkunstwerk” — a synthesis, or total experience, composed of 32 paintings from 50 years of work.

In 2017, Ryman donated 21 paintings to the Dia Art Foundation’s permanent collection, making it the only site with an extensive permanent grouping, featuring works made as early as the late 1950s and continuing up to 2003. Other major museums collecting his works include the Museum of Modern Art, New York; the Tate, London; the Art Institute of Chicago and the Stedelijk Museum in Amsterdam.

== Recognition and reception ==
A recipient of numerous honors, Ryman was awarded a John Simon Guggenheim Foundation Scholarship (1973), the Skowhegan Medal from the Skowhegan School of Painting and Sculpture (1985). He was a member of the American Academy of Arts and Letters after 1994, and assumed the role of the organization’s Vice President in 2003.

In 2005, Ryman was awarded the Praemium Imperiale.

2009 saw the publication of Robert Ryman: Critical Texts Since 1967, edited by Vittorio Colaizzi and Karsten Schubert and published by Ridinghouse. The book charts the gradual evolution of the reception of and reaction to Ryman’s art. A comprehensive selection of over 60 essays and exhibition reviews has been collated into one volume, including texts by some of the most influential art historians and critics of their time; Yve-Alain Bois, Donald B. Kuspit, Lucy R. Lippard, Robert Storr and others.

Ryman's painting Bridge (1980) sold for $20.6 million at a Christie's auction in 2015.

In 2024, Ryman had a retrospective called Robert Ryman: The Act of Looking at the Musée de l’Orangerie in Paris, and in 2026, a retrospective at the Barbican Art Centre titled Robert Ryman: The Real Thing.

Robert Ryman's estate is represented by David Zwirner and Xavier Hufkens.

== Literature ==
- Waldman, Diane. Robert Ryman. Exh. cat. New York: Solomon R. Guggenheim Museum, 1972.
- Robert Ryman. Texts by P. Alessio Saccardo and Luca M. Venturi. Exh. cat. Milan: Edizioni Centro Culturale San Fedele, 1973.
- Robert Ryman. Text by Naomi Spector. Exh. cat. Amsterdam: Stedelijk Museum, 1974.
- Robert Ryman. Text by Carlo Huber. Exh. cat. Basel: Kunsthalle Basel, 1975.
- Robert Ryman. Text by Naomi Spector; statement by Ryman. Exh. cat. London: Whitechapel Art Gallery, 1977.
- Robert Ryman. Texts by Urs Raussmüller and Christel Sauer. Exh. cat. Zurich: InK, Halle für internationale neue Kunst, 1980.
- Robert Ryman. Texts by Yve-Alain Bois, Dominique Bozo, and Christel Sauer. Exh. cat. Paris: Centre Pompidou, Musée national d’art moderne, 1981.
- Ryman: Peintures récentes. Repères: Cahiers d’art contemporain, no. 13. Text by Jean Frémon. Exh. cat. Paris: Galerie Maeght Lelong, 1984.
- Robert Ryman. Foreword by Charles Wright; interviews with Ryman by Gary Garrels and Phyllis Tuchman; statements by Ryman. Exh. cat. New York: Dia Art Foundation, 1988.
- Robert Ryman: New Paintings. Text by Yve-Alain Bois. Exh. cat. New York: Pace Gallery, 1990.
- Robert Ryman. Texts by Urs Raussmüller, Christel Sauer, and Robert Storr; statement by Ryman. Exh. cat. Paris: Espace d’Art Contemporain, 7, rue de Lille; Schaffhausen, Switzerland: Hallen für neue Kunst, 1991.
- Robert Ryman: Versions. Text by Christel Sauer; interview with Ryman by Urs Raussmüller. Exh. cat. Schaffhausen, Switzerland: Hallen für neue Kunst; New York: Pace Gallery, 1992.
- “Robert Ryman.” Künstler: Kritisches Lexikon der Gegenwartskunst, no. 21. Text by Gerhard Mack. Munich: WB Verlag, 1993.
- Sandback, Amy Baker. Robert Ryman Prints, 1969–1993. Print catalogue raisonné. New York: Parasol Press, 1993.
- Storr, Robert. Robert Ryman. Introduction by Nicholas Serota and Robert Storr; catalogue entries by Catherine Kinley and Lynn Zelevansky; chronology by Lynn Zelevanky. Exh. cat. London: Tate Gallery; New York: Museum of Modern Art, 1993.
- Robert Ryman: New Paintings. Exh. cat. New York: Pace Gallery, 1993.
- Buren, Daniel. L’Ineffable: À propos de l’oeuvre de Ryman / The Ineffable: About Ryman’s Work. Paris: Éditions Jannink, 1999.
- “Robert Ryman.” Les Hors-Série de Beaux Arts Magazine, 1999. Texts by Daniel Buren, Alfred Pacquement, Urs Raussmüller, and Christel Sauer.
- Robert Ryman. Text by Christel Sauer. Exh. cat. Paris: Studio 7L, 1999.
- Robert Ryman: Paintings from the Sixties. Text by Thierry de Duve. Exh. cat. Brussels: Xavier Hufkens, 2000.
- Robert Ryman. Texts by Volker Adolphs, Ariane Epars, Clay Ketter, Urs Raussmüller, Barbara Reise, Dieter Ronte, Christel Sauer, Christoph Schreier, Bernhart Schwenk, Christoph Vitali, Albert Weis, and Beat Zoderer. Exh. cat. Munich: Haus der Kunst; Bonn: Kunstmuseum Bonn; Ostfildern vor Stuttgart, Germany: Edition Tertium, 2000.
- Boris, Janet. Art Ed Books and Kit: Robert Ryman. New York: Art Ed Series, 2001.
- Robert Ryman. Interviews with Ryman by Amy Baker Sandback and Phyllis Tuchman. Exh. cat. Zurich: Thomas Ammann Fine Art, 2002.
- Robert Ryman: New Paintings. Text by Yve-Alain Bois. Exh. cat. New York: Pace Wildenstein, 2002.
- Matthiß, Nicole. Robert Rymans Realismus; Oder: Was ist ein Bild? Foreword by Andreas Tönnesmann. Taunusstein, Germany: Verlag Dr. H. H. Driesen, 2004.
- Robert Ryman: Works on Paper, 1957–1964. Foreword and interview with Ryman by Peter Blum. Exh. cat. New York: Peter Blum Edition, 2004.
- Robert Ryman. Texts by Michio Hayashi, Sumi Hayashi, and Ryman. Exh. cat. Sakura, Japan: Kawamura Memorial Museum of Art, 2004.
- Robert Ryman. Text by Ryman. Exh. cat. New York: Pace Wildenstein, 2004.
- Robert Ryman. Text by Jan Dibbets. Exh. cat. Brussels: Xavier Hufkens, 2005.
- Wylie, Charles. Robert Ryman. Contribution by Claire de Dobay Rifelj. Exh. cat. Dallas: Dallas Museum of Art, 2006.
- Raussmüller, Urs, and Christel Sauer, eds. Ryman Paintings and Ryman Exhibitions. Text by Christel Sauer. Frauenfeld/Basel: Raussmüller Collection, 2006.
- Robert Ryman at Inverleith House, Royal Botanic Garden, Edinburgh. Texts by Meret Arnold, Ines Goldbach, and Christel Sauer; interview with Ryman by Urs Raussmüller. Exh. cat. Frauenfeld/Basel: Raussmüller Collection, 2006.
- Frémon, Jean. The Paradoxes of Robert Ryman. Brooklyn: Black Square Editions, 2008.
- Robert Ryman. Texts by Markus Michalke and Bernhart Schwenk. Exh. brochure. Munich: Metropol Kunstraum, 2008.
- Hudson, Suzanne. Robert Ryman: Used Paint. Cambridge, Massachusetts: MIT Press, 2009.
- Colaizzi, Vittorio, and Karsten Schubert, eds. Robert Ryman: Critical Texts Since 1967. London: Ridinghouse, 2009.
- Sauer, Christel, and Urs Raussmüller, eds. Robert Ryman and Urs Raussmüller: Advancing the Experience. Text by Christel Sauer; interview with Ryman by Urs Raussmüller. Exh. cat. Frauenfeld/Basel: Raussmüller Collection, 2010.
- Sretenović, Vesela. Robert Ryman: Variations and Improvisations. Foreword by Dorothy Kosinski; interview with Ryman by Vesela Sretenović. Exh. cat. Washington, D.C.: Phillips Collection, 2010.
- Robert Ryman: Recent Paintings. Exh. cat. New York: Pace Gallery, 2013.
- Colaizzi, Vittorio. Robert Ryman. London: Phaidon, 2017.
- Hoban, Stephen, and Courtney J. Martin, eds. Robert Ryman. Texts by Sandra Amann, Jo Applin, Charles Gaines, Gary Garrels, Suzanne Hudson, Philipp Kaiser, Lucy R. Lippard, Courtney J. Martin, Jessica Morgan, Robert Storr, Kirsten Swenson, and John Szwed. Exh. cat. New York: Dia Art Foundation; New Haven, Connecticut: Yale University Press, 2017.
- Robert Ryman: Drawings. Text by Dieter Schwarz. Exh. cat. New York: Pace Gallery, 2018.
- Robert Ryman. Les Cahiers de la Collection Lambert. Texts by Stéphane Ibars and Alain Lombard. Exh. cat. Arles, France: Actes Sud; Avignon, France: Collection Lambert, 2020.
- Robert Ryman: Early and Late. Texts by Jeffrey Kastner, Lucy Lippard, and Dieter Schwarz. New York: David Zwirner Books, 2024.
- Robert Ryman: Le regard en acte. Texts by Claire Bernardi, Yve-Alain Bois, Susan Dunne, Guillaume Fabius, David Gray and Nicholas Nguyen, Suzanne Hudson, Alfred Pacquement, and Denys Riout. Exh. cat. Paris: Établissement public du musée d’Orsay et du musée de l’Orangerie and Actes Sud, 2024.

An extensive exhibition history and bibliography is available on the website of the Greenwich Collection, Robert Ryman’s foundation.
