= James Hood Wright =

American businessperson

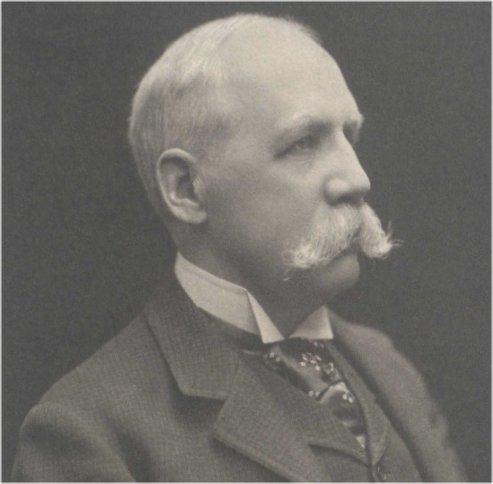
- James Hood Wright, c. 1890
- Born: November 4, 1836; Philadelphia, Pennsylvania, U.S.
- Died: November 12, 1894 (aged 58); New York City, U.S.
- Resting place: Woodlawn Cemetery, Bronx, New York City
- Employer: Drexel, Morgan & Company
- Spouse: Mary Robinson (m. 1881)
- Parent(s): William Wright; Sarah Hood Wright

James Hood Wright (known professionally as J. Hood Wright; November 4, 1836 – November 12, 1894) was an American banker, financier, corporate director, business magnate, and reorganizer of US railroads. He began as a bookkeeper but his management talents led him to becoming a partner in J. P. Morgan's banking firms. He sat on the board of directors for, and reorganized, several railroads. He facilitated investment in Thomas Edison's electrical enterprises and technology. Wright became wealthy in his business operations and was known as a philanthropist in New York City. At the time of his death, interest in his finances set off national media reporting on the size and disposition of his estate.

== Early life ==
Wright was born to William and Sarah Wright (née) Hood in Philadelphia, United States, on November 2, 1836. As a teenager, he became a dry-goods clerk, a position he held for several years.

== Career ==
=== Drexel, Morgan and Company ===
In his early twenties, Wright became a clerk at the Philadelphia banking firm, Drexel and Company, where a talent for bookkeeping led to rapid promotions. He was named a partner around 1864. He excelled in detecting counterfeit money and was given the responsibility to review and identify ersatz currency. Wright moved to New York City to work for Drexel, Morgan and Company, the successor firm of Drexel and Company. Pierpont became fed up with the youngest Drexel brother, Joseph, and was heartened when the Drexels suggested Wright as a potential partner, whom he found "...competent, quick, accurate and a ‘capital negotiator.’" Fearful that losing Joseph would alienate the Drexel family, Pierpont was relieved when Joseph retired that year, allowing him to begin his long association with Wright.

Wright was a partner in the banking firm; he became involved in the management of, as well as invested in, many of the corporations for whom Drexel Morgan provided banking services.

=== Director ===
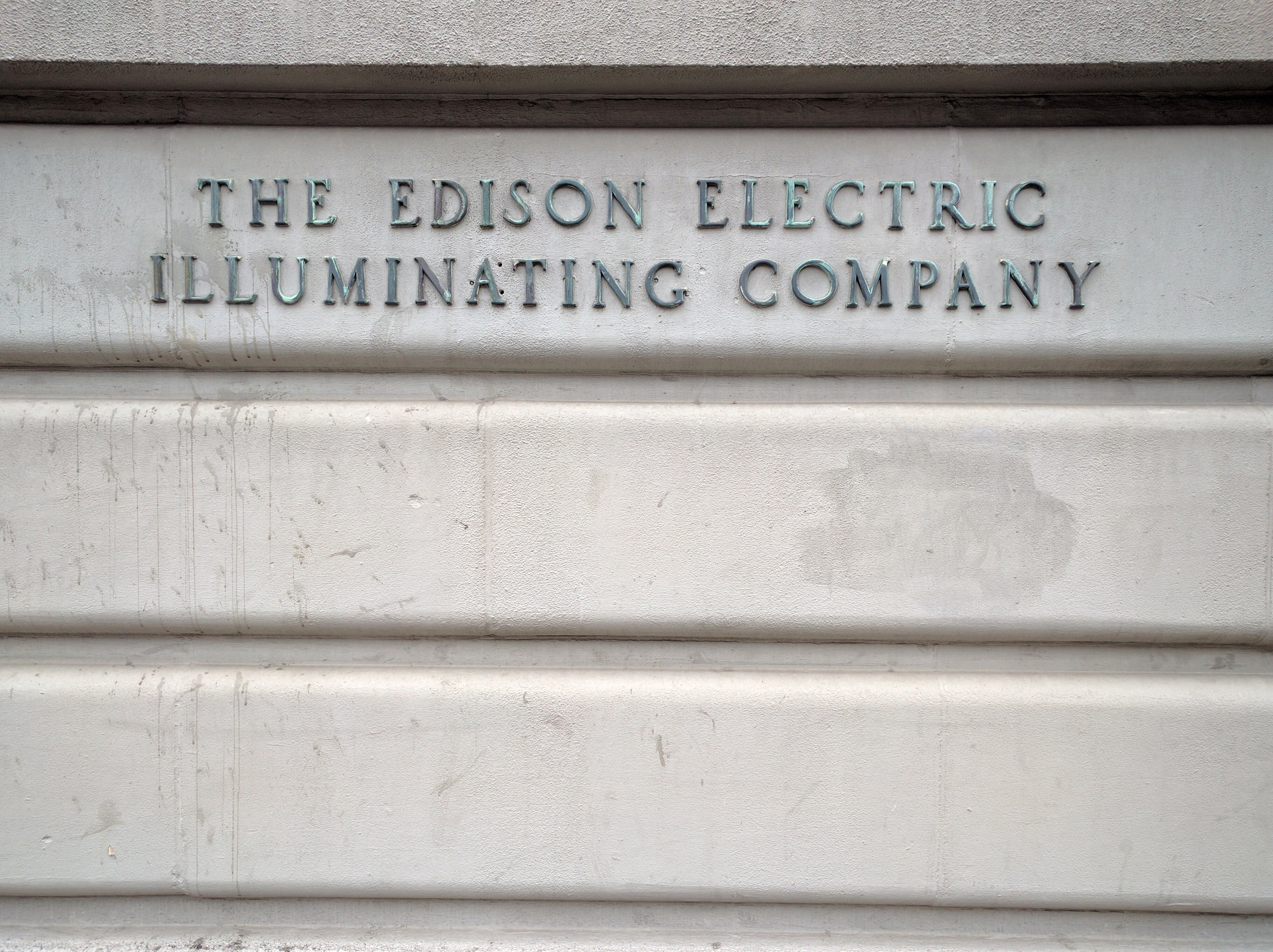
Edison Company sign

Wright was a director of the Edison Electric Illuminating Company.

According to the New York Times, Wright enjoyed a reputation as "one of the most widely known bankers and railroad reorganizers" in the United States. He was a director for the Chicago, Milwaukee and St. Paul Railroad; the Southern Railway; the Long Island Rail Road; and the New York Guaranty and Indemnity Company. Wright was mostly responsible for the reorganization of the Philadelphia and Reading Railroad. Just prior to his death, he was focused on the Richmond and West Point Terminal Railway and Warehouse Company and all the subsidiary railroads the Richmond Railway controlled. He also served as president of the Suburban Rapid Transit Road, overseeing its conversion to an elevated railroad system. He served as a director of the West Shore Railroad and director of the Chicago-based Elgin, Joliet and Eastern Railway Co.

== Personal life and death ==
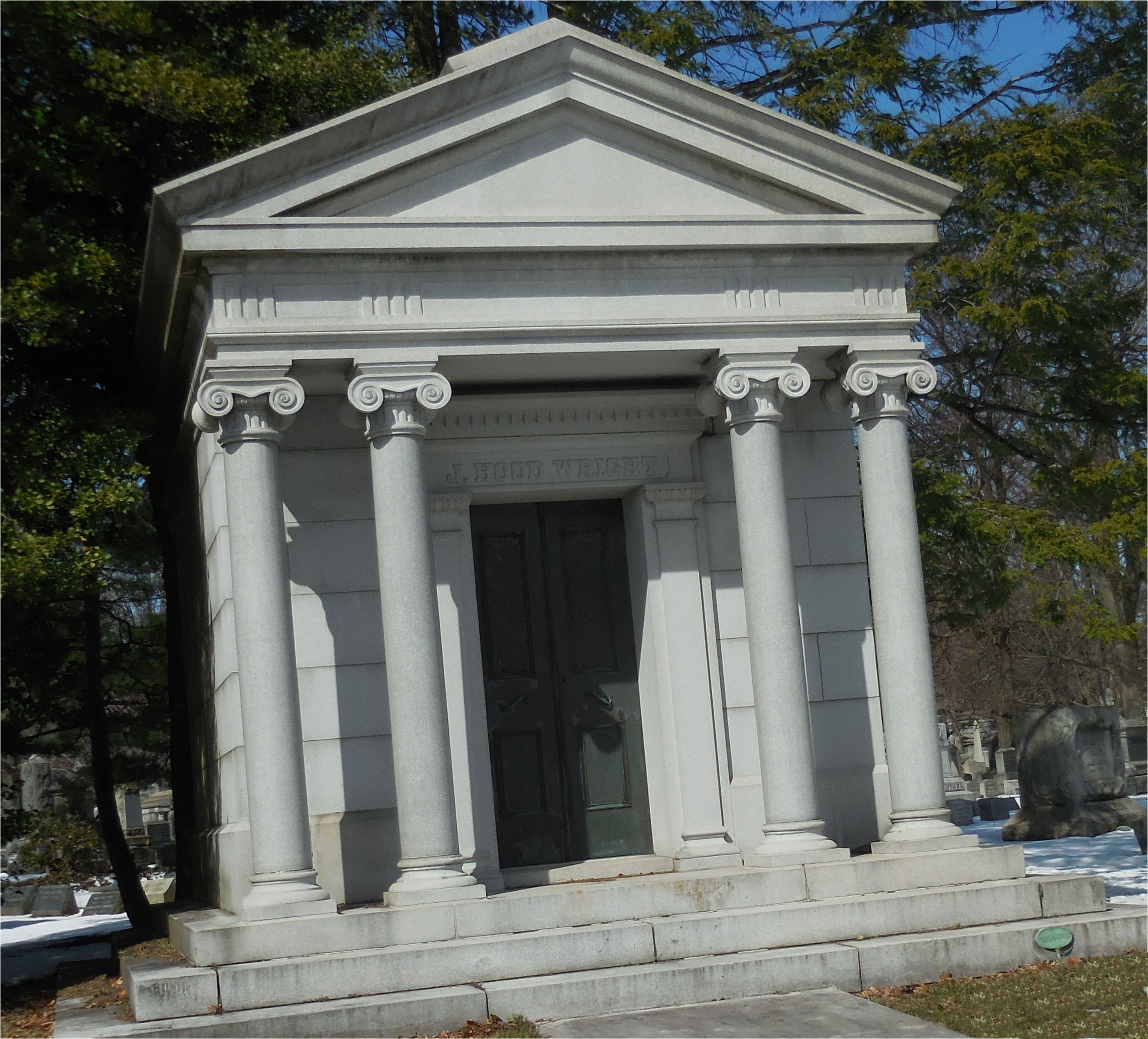
Wright mausoleum

Wright married Mary P. Robinson at Philadelphia's Arch Street Methodist Episcopal Church on March 1, 1881. She was the widow of John M. Robinson, his partner at Drexel, Morgan & Co. The newly wedded couple honeymooned in Washington D.C. in a specially-provided private railroad car.

Wright was president of the Manhattan Hospital. He held memberships in the Metropolitan Club, the City Club, the Riding Club, the New York Yacht Club and the Metropolitan Museum of New York. He was associated with the Republican Party and was a Presbyterian.

In January 1894, he was diagnosed with cardiac disease and partially retired from his work at Drexel Morgan. That summer he spent time cruising on the yacht Yampa with his wife and stepdaughter. Feeling recovered, he returned to the bank in October, but died at an elevated train station in New York City on November 12, 1894, at age 58. His funeral, at his former residence on 174th St. in Washington Hts. was attended by many financial giants of the day, including J. Pierpont Morgan (who acted as pallbearer), George Foster Peabody and William Rockefeller Jr. He is buried at Woodlawn Cemetery in New York City.

== Estate ==
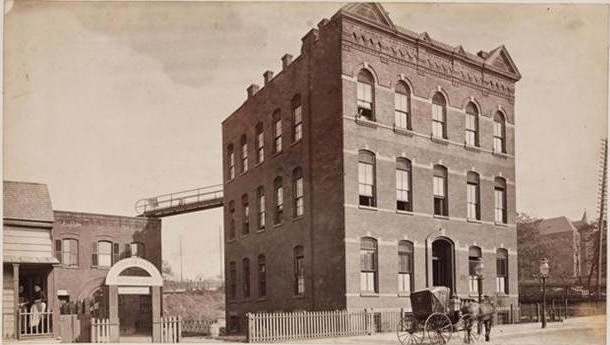
J Hood Wright Memorial Hospital 1886

Upon Wright's death, US newspapers published stories describing his legacy. In 1895 his nephews contested his will. At that time the NY Surrogate Court estimated Wright's fortune was $5 million (equivalent to $186,058,000 in 2025) in liquid assets and $300,000 (equivalent to $11,163,000 in 2025) in property. In March 1895, probate court agreed and set the final determination of the estate at $5 million in liquid assets and $300,000 in property, the majority of which went to his wife, sister and stepchildren.

== Legacy ==
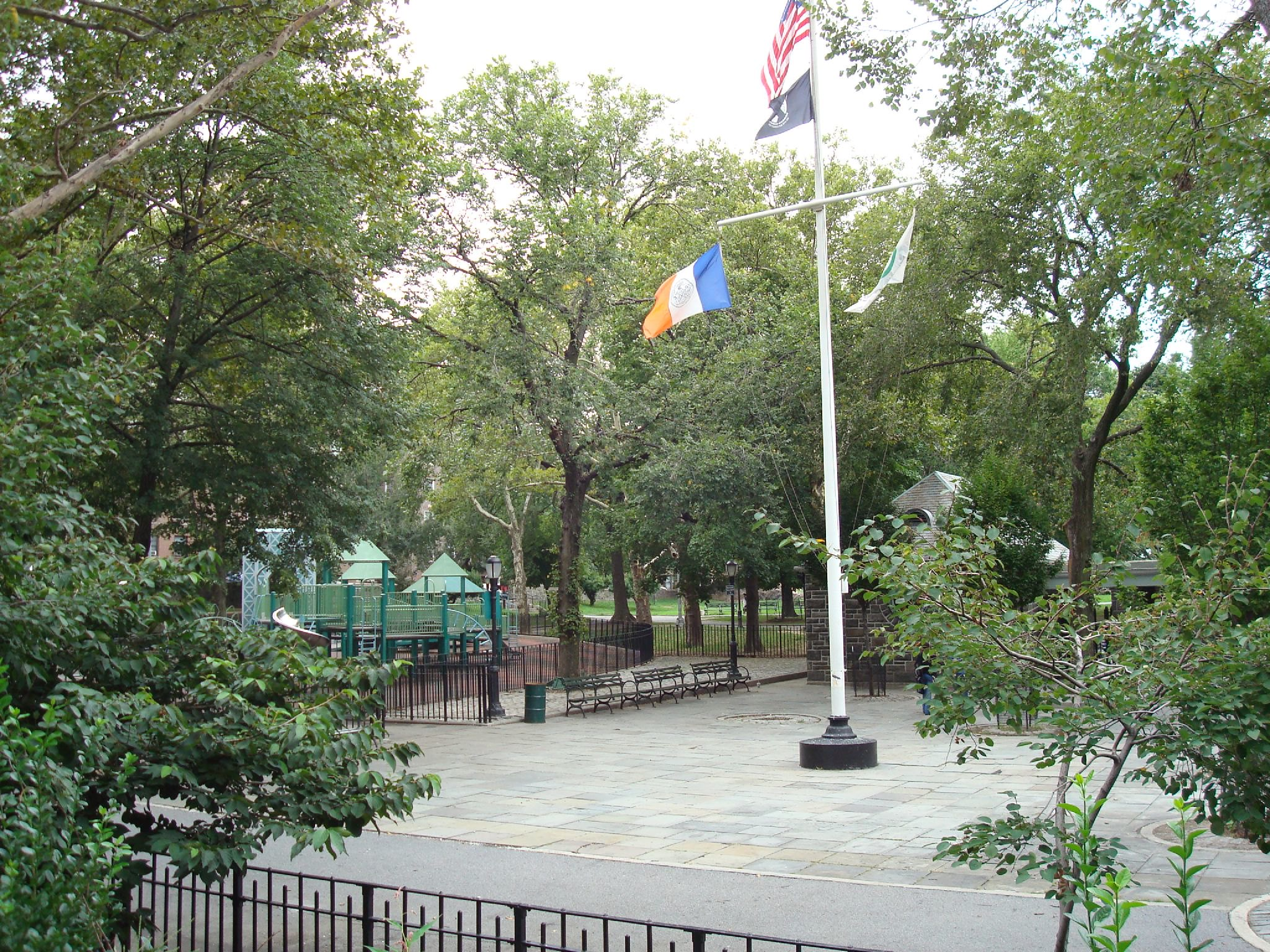
J. Hood Wright Park 2007

Wright donated land for the J. Hood Wright Park in New York City, next to his house at the corner of 175th and Haven. He contributed generously to the Washington Heights Branch of New York's library system. An entrance plaque still honors his financial assistance in changing the library from fee-based to a free library. After his death, the Knickerbocker Hospital contested a grant to the library in Wright's will, saying the branch, absorbed by the New York Public Library, was not entitled to a bequest. The New York State Court of Appeals decided in 1916 that $100,000 (equivalent to $3,721,000 in 2025) was granted to the Washington Heights branch library as this fulfilled the terms of Wright's disposition of his will as a legacy.

Wright funded the creation of the Knickerbocker Hospital (later the J. Hood Wright Memorial Hospital) in New York's Manhattanville district. He designated that interest from a trust was to be used only for operating capital. In 1943, a judge allowed amounts to be taken from the fund principal to save the hospital from closing due to economic problems caused by World War II.

== Sources ==
- Hall, Henry (1895). Volume 1, Successful Men of Affairs. New York tribune.
- Josephson, Matthew (2019). Edison: A Biography. Plunkett Lake Press.
- Railway World. 1894.
- Rhodes' Journal of Banking ...: A Practical Banker's Magazine. B. Rhodes & Company. 1894.
- Rottenberg, Dan (2006). The Man Who Made Wall Street: Anthony J. Drexel and the Rise of Modern Finance. University of Pennsylvania Press. ISBN 9780812219661.
- Strouse, Jean (2014). Morgan: American Financier. Random House. ISBN 9780812987041.
- The National Cyclopaedia of American Biography. Vol. 33. James T. White & Company. 1947.
