= Catawissa (tugboat) =

History
- Owner: Philadelphia and Reading Railroad
- Builder: Harlan and Hollingsworth
- Fate: Scrapped 2008

General characteristics
- Tonnage: 558 GRT
- Length: 158 ft (48 m)
- Beam: 19 ft (5.8 m)
- Depth: 18 ft (5.5 m)
- Installed power: Triple-expansion steam
- Catawissa (tugboat)
- U.S. National Register of Historic Places
- Location within New York
- Location: Lock 3, NY State Barge Canal, Erie Div., Waterford, New York
- Coordinates: 42°47′57″N 73°41′22″W
- Area: less than one acre
- Built: 1898
- Architect: Harlan & Hollingsworth
- NRHP reference No.: 96000828
- Added to NRHP: August 8, 1996

Catawissa was a historic tugboat located at Waterford in Saratoga County, New York. She was built in 1896-1897 by Harlan and Hollingsworth of Wilmington, Delaware for the Philadelphia and Reading Railroad to tow coal barges between ports on the Eastern Seaboard. She was 158 feet in length, 19 feet in beam and 18 feet in depth. She was registered at 558 gross tons. She had a riveted steel framed and plated hull. She was renamed New York in 1941.

Listed on the National Register of Historic Places in 1996, Catawissa was scrapped in 2008.
