= Jason Schmidt (photographer) =

American photographer and director (born 1969)

Jason Schmidt (born June 5, 1969) is an American photographer and director, best known for his portraits of artists and cultural figures. He is based in New York City.

Jason Schmidt graduated from Columbia University in 1992 with a degree in Art History.

== Professional work ==
Jason Schmidt has photographed more than 600 contemporary artists over the twenty years since he began work on the subject. Much of this work has been collected in his books, Artists (2007) and Artists II (2015, Steidl). Schmidt primarily photographs artists in their studios, depicting his subjects in personal settings, revealing aspects of the creative process. Artists he has photographed range from lesser known to world famous and include John Baldessari, Mike Kelley, Cindy Sherman and James Turrell.

Schmidt has exhibited this ongoing body of work at Deitch Projects, New York City (2007); The Margulies Collection, Miami (2008); and The Museum of Contemporary Art, Los Angeles (2012). And his photographs are in the collection of Martin Z. Marguiles, among others.

Art critic Karen Rosenberg observes that Schmidt's photographs "transcend Pollock-paints-a-picture clichés; each photograph has its own peculiar aesthetic, from Paul McCarthy’s being caught like a serial killer in a boat spattered with fake blood, to prankster Maurizio Cattelan’s installing his infamous sculpture of a fallen pope."

Jason Schmidt began his career shooting architecture and interiors and continues to do so for magazines including Architectural Digest and The New York Times T Magazine, as well as for book projects. He has worked with several esteemed architects, such as Annabelle Selldorf and Peter Marino.

In 2013 Schmidt was commissioned by the Hammer Museum to document the architecture of A. Quincy Jones for an exhibition and catalogue.

The museum's Director of Exhibitions and Publications Brooke Hodge writes, "From working with Schmidt on photo shoots of favelas in Rio, a modernist villa in Caracas, and a cozy cabin on Vashon Island near Seattle, I knew he would bring his own perspective to Quincy Jones’s work. More than straightforward documentation, his pictures capture the spirit of a building."

Jason Schmidt's work has been published in Architectural Digest (French, Germans, U.S.), Details, The New Yorker, New York Magazine, The New York Times T Magazine, Vanity Fair, Vogue (U.S., British, Russian, Indian), W Magazine among others.

He has shot advertisements for American Express, Comcast, IBM, Microsoft and others.

Some of the cultural figures Schmidt has photographed include Marina Abramović, Kofi Annan, Michael Bloomberg, Hillary Clinton, Anderson Cooper, Sofia Coppola, Arianna Huffington, Jony Ive, Marc Jacobs, Jeff Koons, Karl Lagerfeld, Michelle Obama, Nancy Pelosi, Ed Ruscha and U2.

In addition to his print work, Schmidt directs short films on both art and architecture for such clients as The New York Times T Magazine, Vanity Fair, Vogue, W Magazine and *Wallpaper.

== Books ==
- (2015) Artists II, by Jason Schmidt. Editors: Alix Browne and Christopher Bollen. Steidl; ISBN 978-3-86930-632-2.
- (2013) A. Quincy Jones: Building for Better Living, by Brooke Hodge, Illustrated by Jason Schmidt. Hammer Museum, Prestel Press; ISBN 978-3-79135-265-7.
- (2010) Twenty Artists: From the Collection of Norman and Norah Stone. Westreich Wagner Press.
- (2010) Living Architecture: Greatest American Houses of the 20th Century. Editors: Dominique Browning and Lucy Gilmour. Assouline Press; ISBN 978-2-75940-470-4.
- (2008) Sarah Morris: Lesser Panda. White Cube; ISBN 1-90607-216-7.
- (2007) Artists, by Jason Schmidt. Editors: Alix Browne and Christopher Bollen. Steidl; ISBN 3-86521-302-2.
- (2006) The Favela-Bairro Project—Jorge Mario Jauregui Architects: The Sixth Veronica Rudge Green Prize in Urban Design. Editor: Rodolfo Machado. Harvard University Press; ISBN 978-0-93561-767-2.
- (2005) Domesticities: At Home with The New York Times Magazine. Editor: Pilar Viladas. Bulfinch; ISBN 978-0-82125-710-4.
