= William Anastasi =

American visual artist (1933–2023)

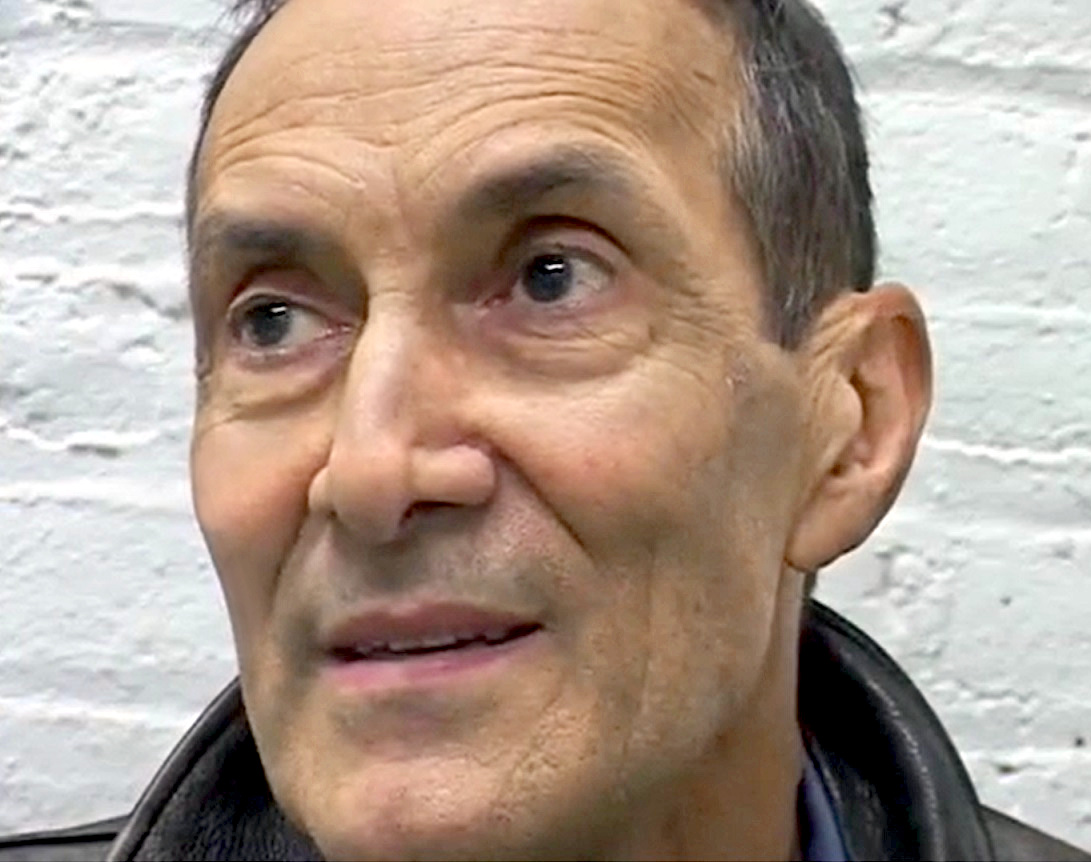
Anastasi c.2004

William Anastasi (August 11, 1933 – November 27, 2023) was an American visual artist working in a wide range of media including drawing, painting, sculpture, photographic works, and text. He lived and worked in New York City from the early 1960s and was known as "one of the most underrated conceptual artists of his generation".

== Biography ==
William Anastasi was born in Philadelphia, Pennsylvania, on August 11, 1933.

His first solo exhibition took place in 1964 at the Betty Parsons gallery following a chance meeting with Philip Guston who recommended his work to Parsons. Following this he had a number of exhibitions at the Dwan Gallery from 1965 to 1970. In his early career, Anastasi was largely influenced by Marcel Duchamp, whose work he first saw at the Philadelphia Museum of Art during his teens.

His work was predominantly abstract and conceptual. Early works of his such as Relief (1961) and Issue (1966) incorporate the use of industrial and construction materials. His works are held by the Metropolitan Museum of Art, the Museum of Modern Art, the Guggenheim Museum, the Whitney Museum, the Walker Art Center, the National Gallery of Art, and the Art Institute of Chicago. In 2010 Anastasi was awarded the Foundation for Contemporary Arts, John Cage Award, an unrestricted grant awarded biennially.

Currently exhibited works by Anastasi include "Nine Polaroid Photographs of a Mirror" at the Metropolitan Museum of Art. In 2007, he took part in the artistic performance "Blind Date" at the White Box Gallery in New York City. In the performance, he and fellow artist Lucio Pozzi both drew dozens of artistic pieces blindfolded in an 8-hour-long artistic duel.

In his early career, Anastasi was largely influenced by Marcel Duchamp, who inspired his shows at the Dwan Gallery from 1965 to 1970.

Anastasi was a close friend of composer John Cage whom he first met in 1965 when Cage heard that Anastasi was preparing an exhibition titled 'Sound Objects' and was interested in learning more. In 1977 Cage and Anastasi began playing chess daily Anastasi wrote the memoir The Cage Dialogues about their friendship.

William Anastasi died on November 27, 2023, at the age of 90.
