= Merrill Wagner =

American visual artist

- Born: 1935 (age 90–91); Tacoma, Washington
- Spouse: Robert Ryman (m. 1969; died 2019)
- Website: merrillwagner.com

Merrill Wagner (born 1935, Tacoma) is an American visual artist. In 1953 Wagner graduated from Annie Wright Seminary (now, Annie Wright Schools) where she went on to attend Sarah Lawrence. In 1957 Wagner graduated from Sarah Lawrence College. She settled in New York City where she studied with Edwin Dickinson and attended the Art Students League of New York. Wagner began her career working in the Minimalist style. Her later work incorporates representational painting executed on a variety of surfaces. Wagner is a member of American Abstract Artists.

Wagner's work was included in the 1971 exhibition Twenty Six Contemporary Women Artists held at The Aldrich Contemporary Art Museum and the 2022 exhibition 52 Artists: A Feminist Milestone also at the Aldrich. Her work is in the collection of the Aldrich Contemporary Art Museum, the Metropolitan Museum of Art, the Smithsonian American Art Museum, and the Whitney Museum of American Art.

Wagner was the second wife of fellow artist Robert Ryman (1930–2019) whom she married in 1969, and with whom she had two children.
