= Major Lazer discography =

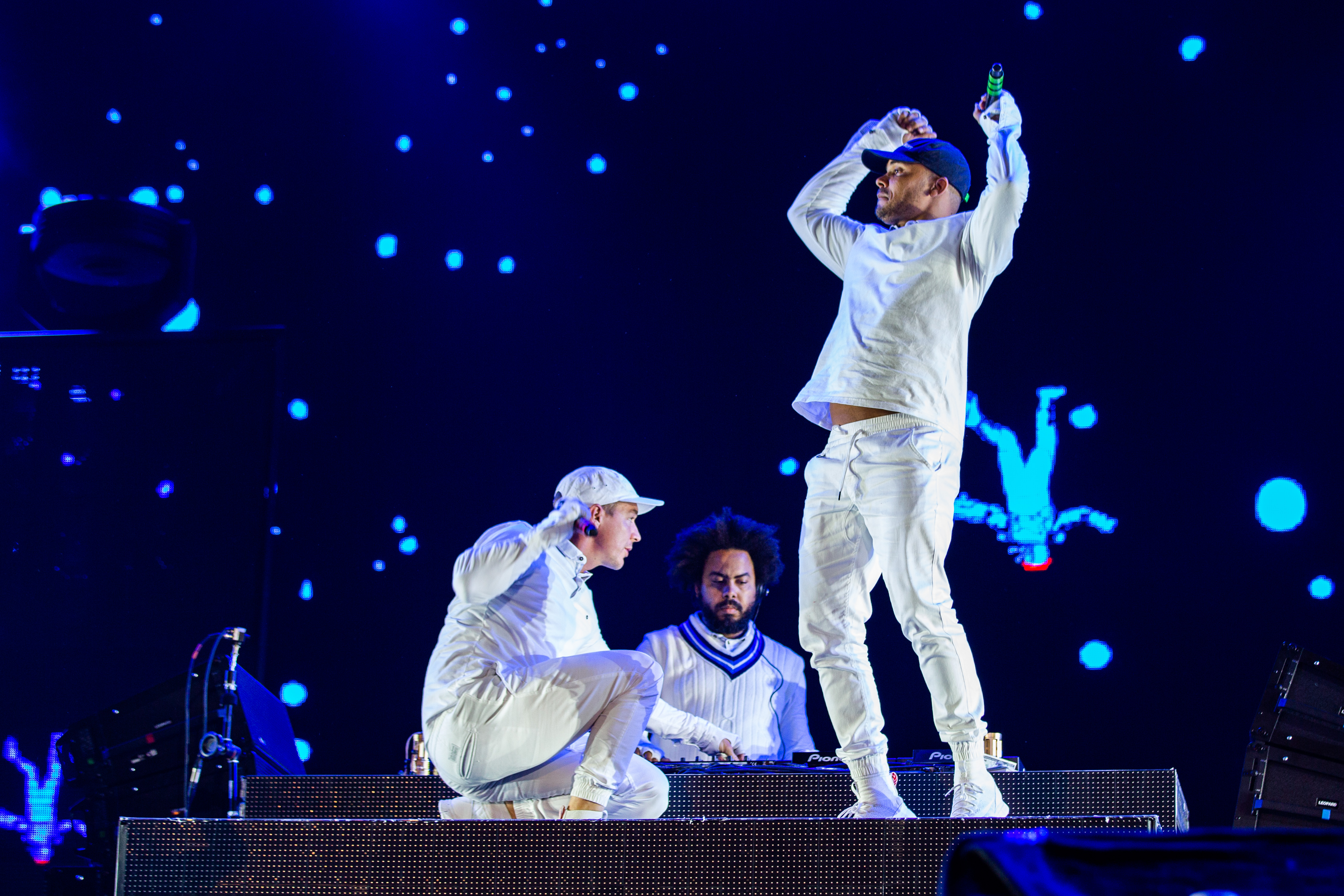
- Diplo, Walshy Fire and Jillionaire of Major Lazer performing at the Flow Festival in Helsinki, Finland, August 2015
- Studio albums: 5
- EPs: 6
- Compilation albums: 1
- Singles: 56
- Remix albums: 4
- Mixtapes: 6
- Promotional singles: 6

The Jamaican-American music project Major Lazer has released five studio albums, one compilation album, four remix albums, six extended plays, six mixtapes, forty-two singles and six promotional singles.

== Albums ==
=== Studio albums ===
List of studio albums, with selected chart positions
Title	Details	Peak chart positions										Sales	Certifications
Title	Details	US	US Dance	AUS	AUT	BEL	CAN	FRA	NLD	SWI	UK	Sales	Certifications
Guns Don't Kill People... Lazers Do	Released: June 16, 2009; Label: Downtown; Formats: CD, LP digital download	169	7	—	—	95	—	—	—	—	—		
Free the Universe	Released: April 16, 2013; Label: Secretly Canadian; Formats: CD, LP, digital download	34	1	5	53	9	—	34	17	45	34	US: 48,000	
Peace Is the Mission	Released: June 1, 2015; Label: Mad Decent; Formats: CD, LP, digital download	12	1	5	32	9	5	11	13	11	25		RIAA: Gold; BPI: Gold; SNEP: Platinum
Music Is the Weapon	Released: October 23, 2020; Label: Mad Decent; Formats: 2×LP, digital download	—	5	—	—	—	—	155	—	—	—		
Piano Republik (with Major League DJz)	Released: March 24, 2023; Label: Mad Decent; Formats: Digital download	—	—	—	—	—	—	—	—	—	—		
"—" denotes a recording that did not chart or was not released in that territory.

=== Compilation albums ===
Title	Details	Peak chart positions					Certifications
Title	Details	US	US Dance	AUS	CAN	UK	Certifications
Major Lazer Essentials	Released: October 19, 2018; Label: Mad Decent; Formats: 3×LP, 2×CD, digital download	188	3	74	74	99	BPI: Gold

=== Remix albums ===
List of mix albums
Title	Album details
Lazer Strikes Back Vol. 1	Released: February 25, 2013; Label: Mad Decent; Format: Digital download
Lazer Strikes Back Vol. 2	Released: March 8, 2013; Label: Mad Decent; Format: Digital download
Lazer Strikes Back Vol. 3	Released: March 22, 2013; Label: Mad Decent; Format: Digital download
Lazer Strikes Back Vol. 4	Released: April 5, 2013; Label: Mad Decent; Format: Digital download

=== Mixtapes ===
- 2009: Major Lazer Essential Mix (available as podcast)
- 2010: Lazerproof (with La Roux, available as a free download)
- 2010: Major Lazer Summer Mix (available as podcast)
- 2013: Major Lazer Workout Mix
- 2014: Major Lazer's Walshy Fire Presents: Jesse Royal – Royally Speaking (available as a free download)
- 2025: Gyalgebra

== Extended plays ==
List of extended plays, with selected chart positions
Title	Details	Peak chart positions							
Title	Details	US	US Dance	DEN	FRA	ITA	NZ	SWE	SWI
Lazers Never Die	Released: July 20, 2010; Label: Mad Decent; Formats: CD, digital download	—	17	—	—	—	—	—	—
Original Don	Released: November 4, 2011; Label: Mad Decent; Formats: CD, digital download	—	—	—	—	—	—	—	—
Apocalypse Soon	Released: February 25, 2014; Label: Secretly Canadian, Mad Decent; Formats: CD, LP, digital download	137	6	—	141	—	28	—	—
Know No Better	Released: June 1, 2017; Label: Mad Decent; Formats: Digital download	91	3	32	81	80	—	8	47
Africa Is the Future	Released: March 20, 2019; Label: Mad Decent; Formats: Digital download, streaming	—	—	—	—	—	—	—	—
Soca Storm	Released: January 28, 2020; Label: Mad Decent; Formats: Digital download, streaming	—	—	—	—	—	—	—	—
"—" denotes a recording that did not chart or was not released in that territory.

== Singles ==
=== As lead artist ===
List of singles as lead artist, with selected chart positions and certifications, showing year released and album name
Title	Year	Peak chart positions										Certifications	Album
Title	Year	US	US Dance	US Club	AUS	AUT	BEL	FRA	NL	SWI	UK	Certifications	Album
"Hold the Line" (featuring Mr. Lexx and Santigold)	2009	—	—	—	—	—	—	—	—	—	—		Guns Don't Kill People... Lazers Do
"Pon de Floor" (featuring Vybz Kartel and Afrojack)	2009	—	—	—	—	—	—	—	—	—	125	BPI: Silver	Guns Don't Kill People... Lazers Do
"Keep It Goin' Louder" (featuring Nina Sky and Ricky Blaze)	2009	—	—	4	—	—	—	—	—	—	—		Guns Don't Kill People... Lazers Do
"Jump Up" (featuring Leftside and Supahype)	2009	—	—	—	—	—	—	—	—	—	—		Guns Don't Kill People... Lazers Do
"Original Don" (featuring The Partysquad)	2011	—	—	—	—	—	—	—	—	—	—		Original Don
"Get Free" (featuring Amber Coffman)	2012	—	—	—	39	—	3	59	8	—	56	BPI: Silver; RMNZ: 2× Platinum	Free the Universe
"Jah No Partial" (featuring Flux Pavilion)	2012	—	30	—	—	—	—^{[A]}	—	—	—	—		Free the Universe
"Watch Out for This (Bumaye)" (featuring Busy Signal, The Flexican and FS Green)	2013	—	41	—	87	40	5	4	6	23	161	BEA: Platinum; SNEP: Platinum	Free the Universe
"Bubble Butt" (featuring Bruno Mars, Tyga and Mystic)	2013	56	8	39	39	—	24	67	42	—	151	RIAA: Gold	Free the Universe
"Scare Me" (featuring Peaches and Timberlee)	2013	—	—	—	—	—	—^{[B]}	—	—	—	—		Free the Universe
"Keep Cool (Life Is What)" (featuring Shaggy and Wynter Gordon)	2013	—	—	—	—	—	—^{[C]}	—	—	—	—		Free the Universe
"Aerosol Can" (featuring Pharrell Williams)	2014	—	—	—	37	—	—^{[D]}	—	—	—	—		Apocalypse Soon
"Come On to Me" (featuring Sean Paul)	2014	—	—	—	—	—	36	21	42	—	—		Apocalypse Soon
"Lean On" (with DJ Snake featuring MØ)	2015	4	1	18	1	3	2	2	1	1	2	RIAA: 10× Platinum; ARIA: 10× Platinum; BEA: 3× Platinum; BPI: 4× Platinum; IFPI AUT: Platinum; IFPI SWI: 2× Platinum; RMNZ: 6× Platinum	Peace Is the Mission
"Powerful" (featuring Ellie Goulding and Tarrus Riley)	2015	83	5	36	7	55	30	78	31	53	54	RIAA: Gold; ARIA: Platinum; BPI: Silver; RMNZ: Platinum	Peace Is the Mission
"Lost" (featuring MØ)	2015	—	—	—	—	—	—	—	—	—	—		Peace Is the Mission
"Light It Up (Remix)" (featuring Nyla and Fuse ODG)	2015	73	6	—	54	9	4	14	2	7	7	RIAA: 2× Platinum; ARIA: Gold; BEA: 2× Platinum; BPI: Platinum; IFPI AUT: Gold; RMNZ: 3× Platinum	Peace Is the Mission
"Who Am I" (with Katy B and Craig David)	2016	—	—	—	—	—	—	—	—	—	89		Honey
"Boom" (with MOTi featuring Ty Dolla $ign, WizKid and Kranium)	2016	—	27	—	—	57	48	53	33	—	—	SNEP: Gold	Peace Is the Mission
"Cold Water" (featuring Justin Bieber and MØ)	2016	2	1	1	1	1	1	2	1	1	1	RIAA: 4× Platinum; ARIA: 5× Platinum; BEA: 2× Platinum; BPI: 3× Platinum; IFPI AUT: Platinum; RMNZ: 6× Platinum; SNEP: Platinum	Major Lazer Essentials
"Believer" (with Showtek)	2016	—	19	—	—	—	—	48	23	—	—		Non-album single
"Run Up" (featuring PartyNextDoor and Nicki Minaj)	2017	66	9	—	27	39	31	16	16	25	20	ARIA: Gold; BPI: Platinum; RMNZ: Platinum	Major Lazer Essentials
"Know No Better" (featuring Travis Scott, Camila Cabello and Quavo)	2017	87	10	36	34	45	38	18	16	30	15	RIAA: Gold; BEA: Gold; BPI: Platinum; ARIA: 2× Platinum; RMNZ: 2× Platinum; SNEP: Platinum	Know No Better
"Sua Cara" (featuring Anitta and Pabllo Vittar)	2017	—	26	—	—	—	—	—	—	—	—		Know No Better
"Leg Over (Remix)" (with Mr Eazi featuring French Montana and Ty Dolla $ign)	2017	—	—	—	—	—	—	—	—	—	—		Non-album singles
"Miss You" (with Cashmere Cat and Tory Lanez)	2018	—	10	—	65	—	—^{[E]}	—	95	—	—	RMNZ: Gold	Non-album singles
"Tip Pon It" (with Sean Paul)	2018	—	40	—	—	—	—	—	—	—	—		Mad Love the Prequel
"Loko" (with Tropkillaz featuring MC Kevinho and Busy Signal)	2018	—	—	—	—	—	—	—	—	—	—	PMB: Gold	Non-album single
"Let Me Live" (with Rudimental featuring Anne-Marie and Mr Eazi)	2018	—	20	—	77	—	16	—	73	99	42	ARIA: Gold; BPI: Sliver; RMNZ: Gold	Toast to Our Differences
"All My Life" (featuring Burna Boy)	2018	—	—	—	—	—	—	—	—	—	—		Major Lazer Essentials and Africa Is the Future
"Orkant/Balance Pon It" (featuring Babes Wodumo)	2018	—	—	—	—	—	—	—	—	—	—		Major Lazer Essentials and Africa Is the Future
"Tied Up" (featuring Mr Eazi & Raye)	2018	—	30	—	—	—	—	—	—	—	—		Major Lazer Essentials and Africa Is the Future
"Loyal" (featuring Kizz Daniel and Kranium)	2018	—	—	—	—	—	—	—	—	—	—		Major Lazer Essentials and Africa Is the Future
"Blow That Smoke" (featuring Tove Lo)	2018	—	21	—	—	—	—	—	—	—	—		Major Lazer Essentials
"Can't Take It from Me" (featuring Skip Marley)	2019	—	20	—	—	—	—	—	—	—	—		Music Is the Weapon
"Make It Hot" (with Anitta)	2019	—	23	—	—	—	—	—	—	—	—		Non-album single
"Que Calor" (featuring J Balvin and El Alfa)	2019	—^{[F]}	6	46	—	—	—^{[G]}	14	91	53	—	RIAA: Gold	Music Is the Weapon
"Trigger" (with Khalid) (Note: Also appears on the Death Stranding: Timefall soundtrack.)	2019	—	—	—	46	—	—	—	—	96	95	RMNZ: Gold	Music Is the Weapon
"Evapora" (with Iza and Ciara)	2019	—	—	—	—	—	—	—	—	—	—		Non-album single
"Rave de Favela" (with MC Lan and Anitta featuring Beam)	2020	—	—	—	—	—	—	—	—	—	—		Music Is the Weapon
"Lay Your Head on Me" (featuring Marcus Mumford)	2020	—	11	—	—	—	43	—	—	—	—		Music Is the Weapon
"Oh My Gawd" (with Mr Eazi featuring Nicki Minaj and K4mo)	2020	—	11	—	—	—	—	—	—	—	—		Music Is the Weapon
"QueLoQue" (featuring Paloma Mami)	2020	—	17	—	—	—	—	—	—	—	—		Music Is the Weapon
"Pra te Machucar" (with Ludmilla featuring ÀTTØØXXÁ and Suku Ward)	2021	—	—	—	—	—	—	—	—	—	—		Music Is the Weapon (Reloaded)
"Diplomatico" (featuring Guaynaa)	2021	—	28	—	—	—	—	—	—	—	—		Music Is the Weapon (Reloaded)
"Titans" (featuring Sia and Labrinth)	2021	—	18	—	—	—	—	172	—	82	—	SNEP: Gold	Music Is the Weapon (Reloaded)
"La Mano" (with Ghetto Kids and Guyanaa featuring Tavo Rayo)	2021	—	—	—	—	—	—	—	—	—	—		Non-album single
"Ko Ko Fun" (with Major League DJz featuring Tiwa Savage and DJ Maphorisa)	2022	—	—	—	—	—	—	—	—	—	—		Piano Republik
"Number 1" (with James Hype)	2023	—	—	—	—	—	—	—	—	—	—		Non-album singles
"Jiggy Woogie" (with Don Diablo and Baby Lawd)	2024	—	—	—	—	—	—	—	—	—	—		Non-album singles
"Nobody Move" (with Vybz Kartel)	2024	—	—	—	—	—	—	—	—	—	—		Guns Don't Kill People... Lazers Do (15th Anniversary Edition)
"Where's the Daddy" (featuring M.I.A.)	2024	—	—	—	—	—	—	—	—	—	—		Guns Don't Kill People... Lazers Do (15th Anniversary Edition)
"Pon de Streets" (with Afrojack)	2024	—	—	—	—	—	—	—	—	—	—		Guns Don't Kill People... Lazers Do (15th Anniversary Edition)
"Gangsta" (featuring Busy Signal and Kybba)	2025	—	—	—	—	—	—	—	—	—	—		Gyalgebra
"Bruk Down" (featuring Parris Goebel and SadBoi)	2025	—	—	—	—	—	—	—	—	—	—		Gyalgebra
"Champagne" (with Machel Montano)	2026	—	—	—	—	—	—	—	—	—	—		Non-album singles
"Papi" (with Tokischa)	2026	—	—	—	—	—	—	—	—	—	—		Non-album singles
"Rotate" (with Skillibeng and Beam)	2026	—	—	—	—	—	—	—	—	—	—		Non-album singles
"—" denotes a recording that did not chart or was not released in that territory.

==== Notes ====
- A "Jah No Partial" did not chart on the Ultratop chart, but peaked at number 59 on the Flemish Ultratip chart.
- B "Scare Me" did not chart on the Ultratop chart, but peaked at number 37 on the Wallonia Ultratip chart.
- C "Keep Cool (Life Is What)" did not chart on the Ultratop chart, but peaked at number 38 on the Flemish Ultratip chart.
- D "Aerosol Can" did not chart on the Ultratop chart, but peaked at number 32 on the Flemish Ultratip chart.
- E "Miss You" did not chart on the Ultratop chart, but peaked at number 15 on the Flemish Ultratip chart.
- F "Que Calor" did not enter the Billboard Hot 100, but peaked at number 23 on the Bubbling Under Hot 100 chart.
- G "Que Calor" did not chart on the Ultratop chart, but peaked at number 11 on the Flemish Ultratip chart.

=== As featured artist ===
List of singles as featured artist, with selected chart positions, showing year released and album name
Title	Year	Peak chart positions	Album
Title	Year	FRA	Album
"Naughty Ride" (WizKid featuring Major Lazer)	2017	154	Sounds from the Other Side
"Walking" (Joji and Jackson Wang featuring Swae Lee & Major Lazer)	2019	—	Head in the Clouds II
"—" denotes a recording that did not chart or was not released in that territory.

=== Promotional singles ===
List of promotional singles, with selected chart positions, showing year released and album name
Title	Year	Peak chart positions			Certifications	Album
Title	Year	US Dance	AUS	FRA	Certifications	Album
"Roll the Bass"	2015	50	—	—		Peace Is the Mission
"Night Riders" (featuring Travi$ Scott, 2 Chainz, Pusha T and Mad Cobra)	2015	40	—	—		Peace Is the Mission
"Too Original" (featuring Elliphant and Jovi Rockwell)	2015	21	—	143		Peace Is the Mission
"Be Together" (featuring Wild Belle)	2015	29	33	150		Peace Is the Mission
"Light It Up" (featuring Nyla)	2015	19	—	—	BPI: Platinum	Peace Is the Mission
"My Number" (with Bad Royale)	2016	—	—	—		Non-album single
"—" denotes a recording that did not chart or was not released in that territory.

== Other charted songs ==
List of songs, with selected chart positions, showing year released and album name
Title	Year	Peak chart positions									Certifications	Album
Title	Year	US Dance	US Dance Digital	BEL	CAN	FRA	MEX Esp.	SPA	UK	VEN	Certifications	Album
"All My Love" (featuring Ariana Grande)	2014	—	—	35	—	135	—	—	194	—		The Hunger Games: Mockingjay, Part 1
"All My Love" (Remix) (featuring Ariana Grande and Machel Montano)	2015	15	12	—	87	—	—	—	—	—		Peace Is the Mission
"Buscando Huellas" (featuring J Balvin and Sean Paul)	2017	37	—	—	—	154	22	58	—	33		Know No Better
"Particula" (with DJ Maphorisa featuring Nasty C, Ice Prince, Patoranking, and Jidenna)	2017	42	—	—	—	—	—	—	—	—	RMNZ: Gold	Know No Better
"En La Cara" (featuring Karol G)	2018	—	—	—	—	—	45	—	—	—		Non-album single
"Already" (Beyoncé featuring Shatta Wale and Major Lazer)	2019	—	—	—	—	—	—	—	95	—		The Lion King: The Gift
"Hell and High Water" (featuring Alessia Cara)	2020	14	21	—	—	—	—	—	—	—		Music Is the Weapon
"C'est cuit" (featuring Aya Nakamura and Swae Lee)	2021	—	—	—	—	72	—	—	—	—		Music Is the Weapon (Reloaded)
"Closer to You" (Jungkook featuring Major Lazer)	2023	6	2	—	—	—	—	—	—	52		Golden
"Sofia" (with Fuerza Regida and Alok)	2024	20	—	—	—	—	—	—	—	—		Pero No Te Enamores
"—" denotes a recording that did not chart or was not released in that territory.

== Guest appearances ==
List of non-single guest appearances, with other performing artists, showing year released and album name
Title	Year	Other artist(s)	Album
"Push and Shove"	2012	No Doubt, Busy Signal	Push and Shove
"Pressure"	2013	Chase & Status	Brand New Machine
"We Make It Bounce"	2014	Dillon Francis, Stylo G	Money Sucks, Friends Rule
"Christmas Trees"	2016	Protoje	A Very Decent Christmas 4
"My Love"	2017	Wale, Wizkid, Dua Lipa	Shine
"Already"	2019	Beyoncé, Shatta Wale	The Lion King: The Gift

== Remixes ==
Year	Artist	Track
2010	Gyptian	"Hold You" (Major Lazer Remix)
2010	Cajmere	"Percolator" (Major Lazer Remix)
2011	Beastie Boys	"Don't Play No Game That I Can't Win" (Major Lazer Beastie Remix Edition)
2012	Hot Chip	"Look at Where We Are" (Major Lazer Remix)
2012	Hot Chip	"Look at Where We Are" (Major Lazer vs. Junior Blender Mix)
2012	No Doubt	"Settle Down" (Major Lazer Remix)
2012	The Prodigy	"Smack My Bitch Up" (Major Lazer Remix)
2012	Popcaan	"Party Shot (Ravin Part 2)" (Major Lazer and ETC!ETC! Remix)
2012	Bruno Mars	"Locked Out of Heaven" (Major Lazer Remix)
2013	Bunji Garlin	"Differentology" (Major Lazer Remix)
2013	Dada Life	"Boing Clash Boom" (Major Lazer Remix)
2013	Konshens	"Gal a Bubble" (Major Lazer, Bro Safari and ETC!ETC! Remix)
2013	No Doubt (featuring Busy Signal)	"Push and Shove" (Dismantle and Major Lazer Remix)
2013	Jack Beats	"KYD" (Major Lazer and Jack Beats Remix)
2013	Machel Montano	"The Fog" (Major Lazer and Grandtheft Remix)
2013	Macklemore & Ryan Lewis	"Can't Hold Us" (Major Lazer Remix)
2014	Dimitri Vegas & Like Mike, Dvbbs and Borgeous	"Stampede" (Major Lazer and P.A.F.F. Remix)
2014	Busy Signal	"Watch Out for This" (Major Lazer Remix)
2014	Major Lazer	"Come On to Me" (Major Lazer and ETC!ETC! Remix)
2014	QQ (featuring Venomous)	"One Drop" (Major Lazer, Shelco Garcia and Teenwolf Remix)
2014	Aidonia	"Pon di Cocky" (Major Lazer, Shelco Garcia and Teenwolf Remix)
2014	Davido	"Skelewu" (Major Lazer and Wiwek Remix)
2014	Flipo and Soca Dennis	"Doh Tell Me Dat" (Major Lazer and Jr Blender Remix)
2014	Ilmari Hakkola	"Shuffle & Spawn" (Major Lazer Moombahton Remix)
2015	Stromae	"Ave Cesaria" (Major Lazer Remix)
2015	Kranium (featuring Ty Dolla Sign)	"Nobody Has to Know" (Major Lazer and KickRaux Remix)
2015	Major Lazer (featuring Nyla and Fuse ODG)	"Light It Up" (Remix)
2017	Anirudh Ravichander	"Cold Water" (Indian Remix Diwali Edition) (Anirudh and Major Lazer Remix)
2017	Ed Sheeran	"Shape of You" (Major Lazer Remix)
2017	Luis Fonsi (featuring Daddy Yankee)	"Despacito" (Major Lazer and Moska Remix)
2018	Cashmere Cat, Major Lazer and Tory Lanez	"Miss You" (Major Lazer and Alvaro Remix)
2020	The Weeknd	"Blinding Lights" (Major Lazer Remix)
2020	Megan Thee Stallion	"Savage" (Major Lazer Remix)
2021	Major Lazer (featuring Aya Nakamura and Swae Lee)	"C'est cuit" (Major Lazer VIP Remix)
2021	Major Lazer (featuring Sia and Labrinth)	"Titans" (Major Lazer VIP Remix)
2021	Camila Cabello	"Don't Go Yet" (Major Lazer Remix)
2021	Camila Cabello	"Don't Go Yet" (Major Lazer Dub)
2023	The Martinez Brothers and Tokischa	"Kilo" (Major Lazer and Ape Drums Remix)
2023	Kim Petras and Nicki Minaj	"Alone" (Major Lazer Remix)
2023	MK (featuring Dom Dolla)	"Rhyme Dust" (Major Lazer Remix)
2023	Davido (featuring Musa Keys)	"Unavailable" (Major Lazer Remix)
2024	Zerb (featuring Sofiya Nzau)	"Mwaki" (Major Lazer Remix)
2024	Amadou & Mariam	"Mogulu" (Major Lazer Remix)
2025	Moliy and Silent Addy	"Shake It to the Max (Fly)" (Major Lazer Remix)
