= Major Lazer Essentials =

Compilation album by Major Lazer
- Released: October 19, 2018
- Genres: Dance; electropop
- Length: 89:04
- Label: Mad Decent
- Producers: Diplo; Jr Blender; The Picard Brothers; Switch; Boaz van de Beatz; King Henry; DJ Snake; Benny Blanco; Willie Colón; The Flexican; FS Green; Skrillex; Afrojack; Ricky Blaze; The Partysquad; Flosstradamus; StarGate; Flux Pavilion; Schlachlhofbonx; Djemba Djemba; Valentino Khan; GTA; MOTi; Jaypizzle; Aryay; Jake Gosling; Chrome Sparks; Versano; Vanic; DJ Maphorisa; DJ Raybel; TJR; E Kelly; 4B

Major Lazer chronology
Know No Better (2017)	Major Lazer Essentials (2018)	Africa Is the Future (2019)

Singles from Major Lazer Essentials
- 1. "Cold Water" Released: July 22, 2016; 2. "Run Up" Released: January 26, 2017; 3. "All My Life" Released: September 13, 2018; 4. "Orkant/Balance Pon It" Released: September 19, 2018; 5. "Tied Up" Released: September 26, 2018; 6. "Loyal" Released: October 3, 2018; 7. "Blow That Smoke" Released: October 17, 2018

Major Lazer Essentials is a compilation album released by American electronic dance music trio Major Lazer. Serving as a double album, it was initially released on October 19, 2018, through the groups record label Mad Decent Records. It includes the singles "Cold Water", "Run Up", "All My Life", "Orkant/Balance Pon It", "Tied Up", "Loyal" and "Blow That Smoke". The album also features appearances from Ariana Grande, Camila Cabello, Quavo, Nicki Minaj, Justin Bieber, Vybz Kartel, Travis Scott, Tarrus Riley, Bruno Mars, Nyla, Sean Paul, MØ, Ty Dolla Sign, Anitta, Ellie Goulding, Burna Boy, Wizkid, and Amber Coffman, among others.

== Track listing ==
Major Lazer Essentials track listing
No.	Title	Writer(s)	Producer(s)	Length
1.	"Blow That Smoke" (featuring Tove Lo)	Thomas Wesley Pentz; Sibel Redžep; Philip Meckseper; Maxime Picard; Clement Picard; Ebba Tove Nilsson; Jakob Jerlstrom; Ludvig Soderberg	Diplo; Jr Blender; The Picard Brothers	3:43
2.	"Lean On" (with DJ Snake featuring MØ)	Pentz; William Grigachine; Meckseper; Karen Marie Ørsted; Charles Flores Jr.	Diplo; DJ Snake; Jr Blender	2:56
3.	"Cold Water" (featuring Justin Bieber and MØ)	Edward Christopher Sheeran; Benjamin Levin; Pentz; Meckseper; Henry Allen; Justin Bieber; Jamie Scott; Ørsted	Diplo; Jr Blender; King Henry; Benny Blanco	3:05
4.	"Light It Up" (featuring Nyla and Fuse ODG)	Pentz; Meckseper; Nailah Thorbourne; Philip Fender; T-Baby; David Alexander Malcolm; Sidney Swift; Nana Abiona	Diplo; Jr Blender	2:46
5.	"Know No Better" (featuring Travis Scott, Camila Cabello and Quavo)	Pentz; Jacques Webster II; Camila Cabello; Quavious Marshall; Allen; Brittany Talia Hazzard	Diplo; King Henry	3:45
6.	"Sua Cara" (featuring Anitta and Pabllo Vittar)	Pentz; Boaz de Jong; Larissa Machado; Pablo Bispo; Jefferson Junior; Arthur Magno Marques; Umberto Tavares; Rashid Badloe; Shareef Badloe; Giordano Ashruf; Rodrigo Antunes	Diplo; Boaz van de Beatz	2:47
7.	"Watch Out for This (Bumaye)" (featuring Busy Signal, The Flexican and FS Green)	Pentz; Rubén Blades; Thomás Goethals; Reanno Gordon	Diplo; Willie Colón; The Flexican; FS Green	4:29
8.	"Powerful" (featuring Ellie Goulding and Tarrus Riley)	Pentz; Ilsey Juber; Omar Riley; Fransisca Hall; M. Picard; C. Picard	Diplo; The Picard Brothers; Skrillex^{[b]}; Switch^{[b]}	3:26
9.	"Pon de Floor" (featuring Vybz Kartel)	Pentz; David Taylor; Nick Van de Wall; Adidja Palmer	Diplo; Switch; Afrojack^{[b]}	3:33
10.	"Hold the Line" (featuring Mr. Lexx and Santigold)	Pentz; Taylor; Chris Palmer; Santi White	Diplo; Switch	3:38
11.	"Keep It Goin' Louder" (featuring Nina Sky and Ricky Blaze)	Pentz; Taylor; Ricardo Johnson; Nicole Albino; Natalie Albino	Diplo; Switch; Ricky Blaze^{[b]}	3:46
12.	"All My Love" (featuring Ariana Grande and Machel Montano)	Pentz; Meckseper; Ørsted; Ella Yelich-O'Connor; de Jong; Ariana Grande-Butera; Machel Montano; Gamal Doyle	Diplo; Jr Blender; van de Beatz	3:49
13.	"Original Don" (featuring The Partysquad; Flosstradamus remix)	Pentz; Taylor; Jerry Leembruggen; Ruben Fernhout; Jasper Helderman; Rodney Price	Diplo; The Partysquad; Flosstradamus^{[c]}	3:54
14.	"Get Free" (featuring Amber Coffman)	Pentz; Taylor; Amber Coffman; David Longstreth	Diplo	4:49
15.	"Run Up" (featuring PartyNextDoor and Nicki Minaj)	Pentz; Meckseper; Jahron Brathwaite; Mikkel Eriksen; Tor Hermansen; Onika Maraj	Diplo; StarGate; Jr Blender	3:23
16.	"Jah No Partial" (featuring Flux Pavilion)	Pentz; Joshua Steele; Errol Osbourne; Lloyd James	Diplo; Flux Pavilion; Schlachthofbonx^{[b]}	4:12
17.	"Be Together" (featuring Wild Belle)	Pentz; Andrew Swanson; Elliot Bergman; Natalie Bergman	Diplo; Djemba Djemba	3:53
18.	"Bubble Butt" (featuring Bruno Mars, Tyga and Mystic)	Pentz; Taylor; Peter Hernandez; Michael Stevenson; Mandolyn Ludium	Diplo; Valentino Khan	3:27
19.	"Jet Blue Jet" (featuring Leftside, GTA, Zia Benjamin, Razz and Biggy)	Pentz; Matthew von Toth; Julio Mejia; Craig Parks	Diplo; GTA	3:19
20.	"Come On to Me" (featuring Sean Paul)	Pentz; de Jong; Sean Henriques; Ashante Reid	Diplo; van de Beatz	3:32
21.	"Boom" (with MOTi featuring Ty Dolla Sign, Wizkid and Kranium)	Pentz; Timotheus "Timo" Romme; Meckseper; Tyrone Griffin Jr.; Ayodeji Balogun; Kemar Donaldson	Diplo; MOTi; Jr Blender	3:06
22.	"Orkant/Balance Pon It" (featuring Babes Wodumo and Taranchyla)	Pentz; M. Picard; C. Picard; Bongekile Simelane; Mandla Maphumulo	Diplo; The Picard Brothers	4:40
23.	"Loyal" (featuring Kizz Daniel and Kranium)	Pentz; M. Picard; C. Picard; Joshua Oasjiokwoeh; Oluwatobiloba Anidugbe; Donaldson	Diplo; The Picard Brothers; Jaypizzle	3:05
24.	"All My Life" (featuring Burna Boy)	Pentz; Meckseper; M. Picard; C. Picard; Damini Ogulu	Diplo; Jr Blender; The Picard Brothers	2:54
25.	"Tied Up" (featuring Mr Eazi, Raye and Jake Gosling)	Pentz; Anouck Boungnag; David Karbal; Zachary Pajak; Rachel Keen; Oluwatosin Adjibade; Jake Gosling	Diplo; Aryay; Gosling	3:07
Total length:				89:04

== Charts ==
=== Weekly charts ===
Weekly chart performance for Major Lazer Essentials
Chart (2018–2019)	Peak position
Australian Albums (ARIA)	74
Belgian Albums (Ultratop Wallonia)	170
Canadian Albums (Billboard)	74
French Albums (SNEP)	185
UK Albums (Official Charts)	99
UK Dance Albums (Official Charts)	9
US Billboard 200	188
US Top Dance Albums (Billboard)	3

=== Year-end charts ===
Year-end chart performance for Major Lazer Essentials
Chart (2019)	Position
US Top Dance/Electronic Albums (Billboard)	12
Chart (2022)	Position
US Top Dance/Electronic Albums (Billboard)	22

== Certifications ==
Certifications for Major Lazer Essentials
Region	Certification	Certified units/sales
France (SNEP)	Gold	50,000^{‡}
United Kingdom (BPI)	Gold	100,000^{‡}
^{‡} Sales+streaming figures based on certification alone.
