= Know No Better =

Know No Better may refer to:

- Know No Better (EP), by Major Lazer, 2017
  - "Know No Better" (song), by Major Lazer, featuring Travis Scott, Camila Cabello and Quavo, 2017
- "Know No Better", a song by Justin Bieber featuring DaBaby, from the 2021 album Justice
