= Step Out =

Step Out may refer to:

== Music ==
- Step Out (Busy Signal album)

=== Songs ===
- "Step Out", song by The Mamas and The Papas J. Phillips 1971
- "Step Out", song by Oasis withdrawn due to similarities to Stevie Wonder's "Uptight"
- "Step Out, Comrades, Together", revolutionary Russian song arranged by Shostakovich
- "Step Out", song by Dangerous Girls 1981
- "Step Out", song by Jerry Paul
