= Greensleeves Rhythm Album 88: Warning =

Greensleeves Rhythm Album #88: Warning

Compilation album by Various artists
- Released: 2008
- Recorded: 2008
- Genre: Dancehall
- Label: Greensleeves
- Producers: Shane Brown & Collin "Demarco" Edwards

Various artists chronology
Airwaves (2008)	Greensleeves Rhythm Album #88: Warning (2008)	Silent River (2009)

Greensleeves Rhythm Album #88: Warning is an album in Greensleeves Records' rhythm album series. It was released in June 2008 on CD and LP. The album features various artists recorded over the "Warning" riddim, produced by Shane Brown (Jukeboxx Crew) and Collin Edwards (aka Demarco).

== Track listing ==
1. "Dem Nuh Bad" - Bounty Killer
2. "Hey Girl" - Busy Signal
3. "Sort Dem Out" - Demarco
4. "Too Much" - Serani
5. "Money Changer" - Mavado
6. "Wanted" - Munga
7. "Loaded" - Busy Signal
8. "Gi Dem Hard" - Elephant Man
9. "Love Many Man" - Delly Ranx
10. "Show Off" - Bling Dawg
11. "From Yu Par" - Wayne Marshall
12. "Nah Change" - Voicemail
13. "Battlefield" - Bling Dawg
14. "Warning Rhythm" - Shane Brown & Demarco
15. "Warning Megamix" - mixed by DJ Kenny
