= My Number =

My Number may refer to:

- "My Number" (Foals song), 2012
- " My Number" (Major Lazer and Bad Royale song), 2016
- My Number: The Anthology, 2001 album by Girl
- My Number (Japan), national identification number in Japan
