= Come On to Me =

Come On to Me may refer to:

- "Come On to Me" (Major Lazer song), a 2014 song by Major Lazer featuring Sean Paul
- "Come On to Me" (Paul McCartney song), a 2018 song by Paul McCartney
