= Greensleeves Rhythm Album 89: Silent River =

Greensleeves Rhythm Album #89: Silent River

Compilation album by Various artists
- Released: 2009
- Recorded: 2008
- Genre: Dancehall
- Length: 48:39
- Label: Greensleeves
- Producer: Shane Brown

Various artists chronology
| Warning (2008) | Greensleeves Rhythm Album #89: Silent River (2009) | Set Mi Free (2009) |

Professional ratings
Review scores
| Source | Rating |
|---|---|
| Allmusic | 3.5/5 stars |

Greensleeves Rhythm Album #89: Silent River is an album in Greensleeves Records' rhythm album series. It was released February 16, 2009 on CD. The album features various artists recorded over the "Silent River" riddim, produced by Shane Brown (Jukeboxx Crew).

== Track listing ==
1. "Dem A Pree (Vybz Kartel Diss)" - Mavado 3:33
2. "Rise Di K" - Vybz Kartel 3:17
3. "Corrupt" - Bounty Killer 3:33
4. "Whine" - Busy Signal 3:10
5. "God Nah Sleep" - Demarco 3:18
6. "Nah Linga" - Voicemail 3:33
7. "That Yu Fi Run" - Elephant Man3:24
8. "Inna Mi Room" - Assassin 3:22
9. "When Wi Waan" - Munga 3:33
10. "Put Yuh Hands Up" - Ishauna 3:33
11. "Style And Swagga" - Christopher Martin 3:33
12. "Money Wi Say" - Busy Signal 2:47
13. "Almighty Bless" - Bugle 3:24
14. "Slow Whine" - Bling Dawg 3:16
15. "Blahdas" - Mr. Vegas 3:29
