= The Flexican =

Dutch disc jockey

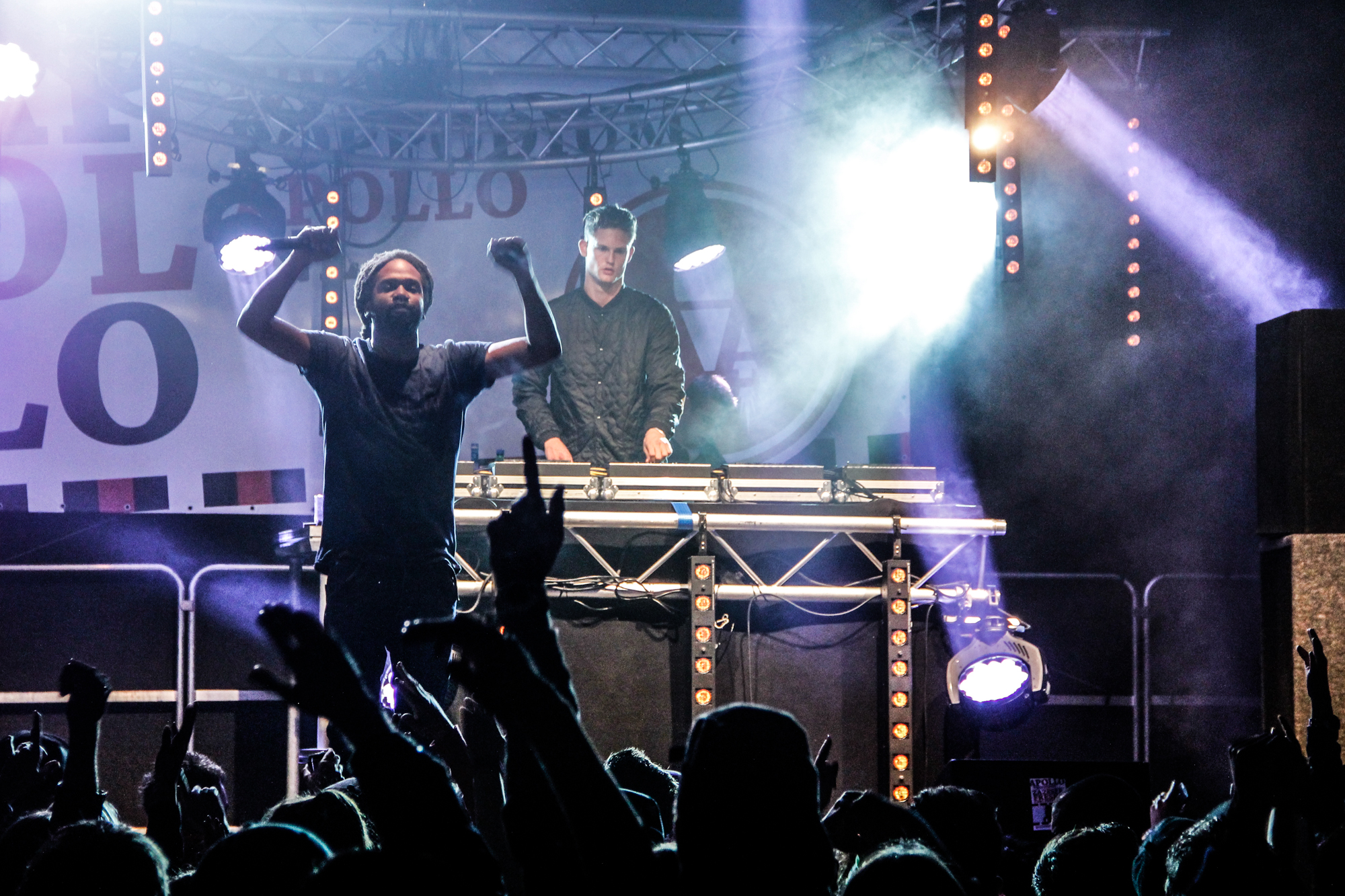
- The Flexican & Mc Fit Emmen Open Air 2013

Background information
- Born: Thomás Goethals; 11 October 1983 (age 42); Mexico City, Mexico
- Genres: Hip hop, moombahton, electronic, baltimore club, baile funk, ghettotech, breakbeat
- Occupations: Record producer, DJ, remixer
- Years active: 2003–present
- Label: TopNotch

Thomás Goethals (born 11 October 1983 in Mexico City, Mexico), better known by his stage name The Flexican is a Mexican-born Dutch DJ. He is a member of Dutch rap group Flinke Namen.

== Biography ==
Thomás was born in Mexico City and lived there for nine years of his life. There he was heavily influenced by Latin and rock music, which developed in him a great interest in music since very young. When his parents divorced around 1992, he traveled to Netherlands with his mother and brother. The family settled in Buitenveldert.

In Netherlands, he developed a further obsession with music, having a fascination for electronic music and hip hop. He eventually realized electronic music should be his future, and so he attended at the SAE Institute of Amsterdam, Netherlands. He graduated two years later, having mastered his music production and mixing skills.

In 2004, Goethals founded the rap group Flinke Namen alongside rapper and longtime friend Sef and rapper MC Fit. The following year, Murth The Man-O-Script joined the group. He released his first mixtape, Op Volle Toeren (Dutch: At Full Speed) in 2008, featuring Dutch rappers like The Opposites and Dio.

He has his own club nights under the name Yours Truly at venues like Jimmy Woo and 013 Tilburg . He's always assisted by Sef during these nights.

The Flexican, along with FS Green and Major Lazer, is behind 2013 hit single "Watch Out for This (Bumaye)", featuring Jamaican artist Busy Signal. The track was originally an instrumental moombahton redux of "Bumaye", a song produced by him featuring Dutch rapper Typhoon, which was eventually picked up by Diplo to be featured on the album Free The Universe. All three tracks sample Willie Colón & Rubén Blades's song "María Lionza".

His stage name comes from the fact that "he is of Mexican descent and is also very flexible in his work" (in reference to his eclectic style).
