= A Msterdamn =

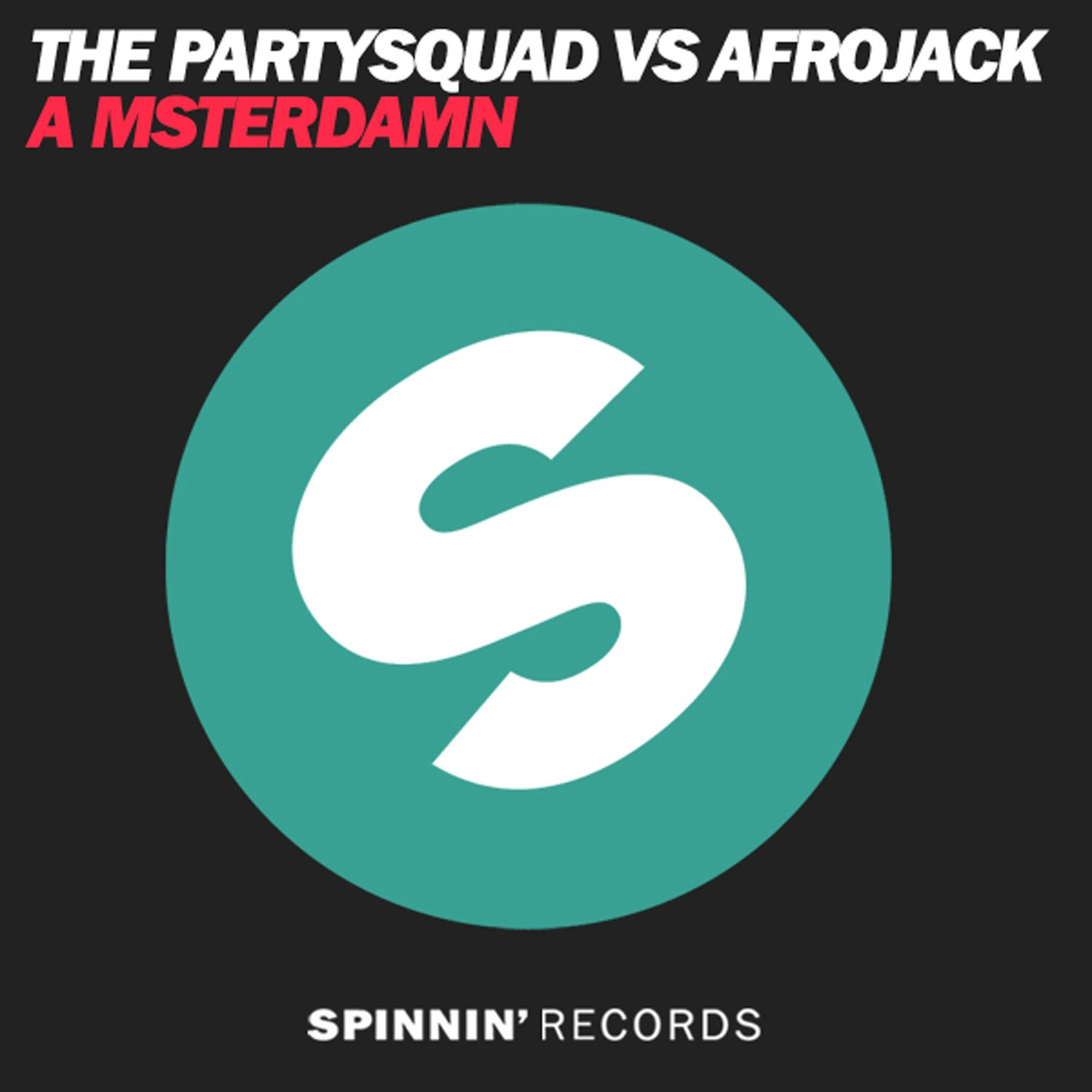

Single by The Partysquad vs. Afrojack
- Released: 10 May 2010
- Genre: House
- Length: 4:49
- Label: Spinnin Records
- Songwriter: Nick Van De Wall
- Producers: The Partysquad & Nick Van De Wall (aka Afrojack)

Afrojack singles chronology
"Real High" (2010)	"A Msterdamn" (2010)	"Quacky" (2010)

"A Msterdamn" is a song by Dutch music producer and DJ Afrojack in collaboration with Dutch DJ-team the Partysquad. The single was released digitally on 10 May 2010 in the Netherlands.

== Music video ==
The music video was released on 27 March 2010 on the official Spinnin' Records YouTube channel. It shows two people having an evening of alcohol, illegal parties, strip clubs, marijuana and cocaine until, they are beaten by a lady. Then at the end, the two people were with prostitutes.

== Track listing ==
Digital download
No.	Title	Length
1.	"A Msterdamn" (Extended Edit)	4:49

== Chart performance ==
Chart (2011)	Peak position
Netherlands (Single Top 100)	86

== Release history ==
Country	Date	Format	Label
Netherlands	10 May 2010	Digital download	Spinnin Records
