= Loaded (Busy Signal album) =

2008 album by Busy Signal

Studio album by Busy Signal
- Released: September 23, 2008 (United States)
- Recorded: 2005
- Genre: Dancehall; Reggae; Reggae fusion
- Label: VP Records
- Producer: Dave Kelly (executive); Tony Kelly; DASECA Productions; C. Cunningham

Busy Signal chronology
Step Out (2006)	Loaded (2008)

Singles from Loaded
- 1. "Jail"; 2. "Whine Pon Di Edge"; 3. "These Are the Days"

Loaded is the second studio album by Jamaican dancehall artist Busy Signal. It was released on September 23, 2008, through VP Records. The album features the hit singles "Jail," "Whine Pon Di Edge," and "These Are the Days." Guest appearances include Mykal Roze and Alborosie.

== Critical reception ==
In a review for AllMusic, James Steiner was complementary about the "surprising array of styles" featured on the album. Angus Taylor, writing for BBC Music, thought that while it was an "excellent collection" of music, the excessive use of autotune would date the album.

== Track listing ==
No.	Title	Length
1.	"People So Evil"	2:57
2.	"Jail"	3:10
3.	"Tic Toc"	3:08
4.	"Wine Pon Di Edge"	2:37
5.	"Fast, Fast, Fast, Fast"	2:31
6.	"Hey Girl"	2:26
7.	"Real Jamaican" (featuring Mykal Roze)	3:16
8.	"Unknown Number"	3:15
9.	"These Are the Days"	3:31
10.	"Hustle Hard"	0:39
11.	"My World"	3:05
12.	"Strappings"	0:29
13.	"Cool Baby"	2:46
14.	"Knocking at Your Door"	3:00
15.	"Murderer" (featuring Alborosie)	6:52
