= Mwaki =

Single by Zerb featuring Sofiya Nzau

from the EP Surrender
- Language: Kikuyu
- English title: "Fire"
- Released: 10 November 2023
- Genre: Progressive house
- Length: 3:28
- Label: Th3rd Brain
- Songwriters: Matheus Zerbini Massa; Sofiya Nzau
- Producer: Zerb

Zerb singles chronology
"Use Somebody" (2023)	"Mwaki" (2023)	"Addicted" (2024)

Sofiya Nzau singles chronology
"Saufiya" (2023)	"Mwaki" (2023)	"Just Another Woman" (2023)

Music video
- "Mwaki" on YouTube

"Mwaki" is a song by Brazilian DJ and producer Zerb from his third extended play (EP), Surrender (2023). It features Kenyan singer Sofiya Nzau who performs the song in the Kikuyu language. "Mwaki" was released as a single on 10 November 2023 through the independent record label, Th3rd Brain. A month later, it went viral on the video-sharing service TikTok.

== Background and composition ==
Zerb discovered Nzau through vocal tracks she uploaded online and used it for his production of "Mwaki".

"Mwaki" is a progressive house song written in the key of G minor with a tempo of 120 beats per minute. The title translates to "Fire" in Kikuyu language. Nzau explained that the song is about "a woman who is in love with a man her parents are not in approval of, but she's willing to fight for him, and to cover him. Just so she can be with him. Just so she can experience love."

== Music video ==
The music video was directed by Indian director Mikhail Mehran and filmed at Hell's Gate National Park in Kenya. Zerb and Nzau appear in the video with a bevy of Kenyan dancers. The video was released on 29 January 2024.

== Track listings ==
- Digital download and streaming
1. "Mwaki" – 3:28
2. "Mwaki" (sped up) – 2:58
3. "Mwaki" (slowed) – 4:09
- Digital download and streaming – Tiësto's VIP mix
1. "Mwaki" (Tiësto's VIP mix) – 2:40
2. "Mwaki" – 3:28
- Digital download and streaming – Major Lazer remix
1. "Mwaki" (Major Lazer remix) – 3:15
2. "Mwaki" (Tiësto's VIP mix) – 2:40
3. "Mwaki" – 3:28
- Digital download and streaming – Refreshed
1. "Mwaki" – 3:28
2. "Mwaki" (Tiësto's VIP mix) – 2:40
3. "Mwaki" (Major Lazer remix) – 3:15
4. "Mwaki" (Chris Avantgarde and Kevin de Vries remix) – 4:11
5. "Mwaki" (Tyler ICU remix) – 4:02
6. "Mwaki" (Duke Dumont and Kiko Franco remix) – 2:33
7. "Mwaki" (ATB Anthem remix) – 3:18
8. "Mwaki" (Major League Djz remix) – 5:31
9. "Mwaki" (&friends remix) – 3:54
10. "Mwaki" (Timmy Trumpet remix) – 2:57
11. "Mwaki" (Mia Moretti remix) – 3:33
12. "Mwaki" (Franky Wah remix) – 3:37
13. "Mwaki" (Sunnery James & Ryan Marciano remix) – 2:12
14. "Mwaki" (KVSH and Dynamick remix) – 2:42
15. "Mwaki" (Skytech remix) – 2:47
16. "Mwaki" (Robin Tordjman remix) – 3:32
17. "Mwaki" (Kordhell remix) – 1:45
18. "Mwaki" (sped up) – 2:58
19. "Mwaki" (slowed) – 4:09

== Charts ==
=== Weekly charts ===
Weekly chart performance for "Mwaki"
Chart (2023–2024)	Peak position
Austria (Ö3 Austria Top 40)	46
Belarus Airplay (TopHit)	1
Belgium (Ultratop 50 Flanders)	8
Belgium (Ultratop 50 Wallonia)	6
Bulgaria Airplay (PROPHON)	3
Canada CHR/Top 40 (Billboard)	37
CIS Airplay (TopHit)	7
Croatia International Airplay (Top lista)	8
Estonia Airplay (TopHit)	24
France (SNEP)	50
Germany (GfK)	25
Global Excl. US (Billboard)	123
Greece International (IFPI)	10
Hungary (Dance Top 40)	6
Italy (FIMI)	69
Kazakhstan Airplay (TopHit)	9
Latvia Airplay (TopHit)	5
Latvia Airplay (TopHit) Tiësto's VIP Mix	88
Lithuania (AGATA)	97
Lithuania Airplay (TopHit)	17
Luxembourg (Billboard)	15
Moldova Airplay (TopHit)	1
Netherlands (Dutch Top 40)	13
Netherlands (Single Top 100)	19
Poland (Polish Airplay Top 100)	49
Portugal (AFP)	38
Romania (Billboard)	13
Romania Airplay (Media Forest)	2
Romania TV Airplay (Media Forest)	2
Russia Airplay (TopHit)	9
San Marino Airplay (SMRTV Top 50)	13
Switzerland (Schweizer Hitparade)	18
Turkey International Airplay (Radiomonitor Türkiye)	1
UK Singles Sales (OCC)	56

=== Monthly charts ===
Monthly chart performance for "Mwaki"
Chart (2023–2024)	Peak position
Belarus Airplay (TopHit)	4
CIS Airplay (TopHit)	8
Estonia Airplay (TopHit)	37
Kazakhstan Airplay (TopHit)	17
Latvia Airplay (TopHit)	13
Latvia Airplay (TopHit) Tiësto's VIP Mix	91
Lithuania Airplay (TopHit)	22
Moldova Airplay (TopHit)	1
Romania Airplay (TopHit)	6
Russia Airplay (TopHit)	12

=== Year-end charts ===
Year-end chart performance for "Mwaki"
Chart (2024)	Position
Belarus Airplay (TopHit)	22
Belgium (Ultratop Flanders)	9
Belgium (Ultratop 50 Wallonia)	22
Bulgaria Airplay (PROPHON)	2
CIS Airplay (TopHit)	20
France (SNEP)	170
Germany (GfK)	45
Hungary (Dance Top 40)	15
Italy (FIMI)	100
Kazakhstan Airplay (TopHit)	26
Moldova Airplay (TopHit)	3
Netherlands (Dutch Top 40)	34
Netherlands (Single Top 100)	37
Portugal (AFP)	93
Romania Airplay (TopHit)	8
Russia Airplay (TopHit)	26
Switzerland (Schweizer Hitparade)	25

2025 year-end chart performance for "Mwaki"
Chart (2025)	Position
Belgium (Ultratop 50 Flanders)	158
Belgium (Ultratop 50 Wallonia)	184
CIS Airplay (TopHit)	159
Hungary (Dance Top 40)	37
Moldova Airplay (TopHit)	5
Romania Airplay (TopHit)	96

== Certifications ==
Certifications for "Mwaki"
Region	Certification	Certified units/sales
France (SNEP)	Platinum	200,000^{‡}
Italy (FIMI)	Platinum	100,000^{‡}
Streaming
Greece (IFPI Greece)	3× Platinum	6,000,000^{†}
^{‡} Sales+streaming figures based on certification alone.^{†} Streaming-only figures based on certification alone.
