= Know No Better (EP) =

2017 EP by Major Lazer

EP by Major Lazer
- Released: June 1, 2017
- Genres: Hip hop; moombahton; pop
- Length: 19:37
- Languages: English; Portuguese; Spanish
- Label: Mad Decent
- Producers: Diplo; Boaz van de Beatz; DJ Maphorisa; Junior Blender; King Henry; Nonsens

Major Lazer chronology
Peace Is the Mission (2015)	Know No Better (2017)	Major Lazer Essentials (2018)

Singles from Know No Better
- 1. "Know No Better" Released: June 1, 2017; 2. "Sua Cara" Released: July 30, 2017

Know No Better is the fourth extended play (EP) by American electronic music trio Major Lazer, released on June 1, 2017, by Mad Decent.

== Background ==
The EP includes 6 tracks featuring collaborations with numerous artists, including Travis Scott, Camila Cabello, Quavo, J Balvin, Sean Paul, Nasty C, Ice Prince, Patoranking, Jidenna, Busy Signal, Machel Montano, Konshens, Anitta and Pabllo Vittar.

== Singles ==
The lead single, "Know No Better", was announced as the original lead single on May 22, 2017, to be released official single with on May 31, 2017, featuring vocals from American rappers, Travis Scott and Quavo, and Cuban-American singer Camila Cabello. Major Lazer later clarified, by tweeting out that the song would be released on June 1, at 8 AM ET, 12 PM BST. Camila Cabello teased the original track on May 26, by tweeting out lyrics from the song. She also posted snippets of the song on her Snapchat story the same day.

The second single, "Sua Cara", was announced in February 2017, to be released official single with on July 30, 2017, featuring vocals from Brazilian singers Anitta and Pabllo Vittar. On June 20, Major Lazer traveled to Morocco along with Anitta and Pabllo Vittar to record the music video for "Sua Cara". It was directed by Bruno Ilogti.

=== Other songs ===
A music video for the song "Particula" was released on October 12, 2017. The song also appeared on Give Me Future. Music videos for the songs "Buscando Huellas" and "Jump" were also released.

== Critical reception ==
Andy Cush of Spin wrote that the EP "sounds the same". He added, "Maybe at some point soon they'll recognize that the magic of these particular tricks is starting to wear out. Or, like the title of the record implies, maybe they don't know anything better". Pitchfork's Jonah Bromwich gave the EP a positive review, stating that: "And as fun as it is at times, Know No Better doubles as a testament to the result of spreading a handful of good ideas too thin."

== Track listing ==
No.	Title	Writer(s)	Producer(s)	Length
1.	"Know No Better" (featuring Travis Scott, Camila Cabello and Quavo)	Thomas Wesley Pentz; Jacques Webster; Cabello; Quavious Marshall; Henry Allen; Brittany Hazzard	Diplo; King Henry; Jr Blender^{[b]}	3:45
2.	"Buscando Huellas" (featuring J Balvin and Sean Paul)	Pentz; José Alvaro Osorio Balvin; Sean Henriques; Boaz de Jong; Robin Anthony P. Francesco; Alejandro Ramirez	Diplo; Boaz van de Beatz; Jr Blender	2:53
3.	"Particula" (with DJ Maphorisa featuring Nasty C, Ice Prince, Patoranking, and Jidenna)	Pentz; Themba Sonnyboy Sekowe; Nsikayesizwe David Junior Ngcobo; Panshak Henry Zamani; Jidenna Mobisson; Patrick Nnaemeka Okorie	Diplo; DJ Maphorisa; Jr Blender	3:24
4.	"Jump" (featuring Busy Signal)	Pentz; Reanno Gordon; Anton Twile Nielsen; Jens Espersen; Rasmus Mygind Korsby	Diplo; Nonsens	3:03
5.	"Sua Cara" (featuring Anitta and Pabllo Vittar)	Pentz; Larissa Machado; de Jong; Pablo Luiz Bispo; Jefferson Junior; Arthur Magno Simones Marques; Umberto Tavares; Rashid Badloe; Giordano Ashruf; Rodrigo Pereira Vilela Antunes; Shareef Badloe	Diplo; Boaz van de Beatz	2:47
6.	"Front of the Line" (featuring Machel Montano and Konshens)	Pentz; Machel Montano; Garfield Delano Spence; Phillip Meckseper; Allen; Gamal Doyle	Diplo; Junior Blender; King Henry^{[a]}	3:45
Total length:				19:37

- ^{^[a]} signifies a co-producer.
- ^{^[b]} signifies an additional producer.
- All songwriting credits are adapted from liner notes.

== Charts ==
=== Weekly charts ===
Chart (2017)	Peak position
Danish Albums (Hitlisten)	32
French Albums (SNEP)	81
Italian Albums (FIMI)	80
New Zealand Heatseekers Albums (RMNZ)	3
Swedish Albums (Sverigetopplistan)	8
Swiss Albums (Schweizer Hitparade)	47
US Billboard 200	91
US Top Dance Albums (Billboard)	3

=== Year-end charts ===
Chart (2017)	Position
US Top Dance/Electronic Albums (Billboard)	16

== Certifications ==
Certifications for "Know No Better"
Region	Certification	Certified units/sales
New Zealand (RMNZ)	Gold	7,500^{‡}
^{‡} Sales+streaming figures based on certification alone.
