= Run Up =

Single by Major Lazer featuring PartyNextDoor and Nicki Minaj

from the album Major Lazer Essentials
- Released: January 26, 2017
- Recorded: 2016
- Genre: Dancehall
- Length: 3:23
- Label: Mad Decent; Because
- Songwriters: Thomas Pentz; Tor Erik Hermansen; Mikkel Storleer Eriksen; Jahron Brathwaite; Onika Maraj; Philip Meckseper; Aizuss
- Producers: Major Lazer; Stargate; Jr Blender

Major Lazer singles chronology
"Believer" (2016)	"Run Up" (2017)	"Know No Better" (2017)

PartyNextDoor singles chronology
"Not Nice" (2016)	"Run Up" (2017)	"Still Got Time" (2017)

Nicki Minaj singles chronology
"Side to Side" (2016)	"Run Up" (2017)	"Swalla" (2017)

"Run Up" is a song by the American electronic band Major Lazer featuring the Canadian singer PartyNextDoor and the Trinidadian rapper Nicki Minaj. It was released on YouTube on January 26, 2017, by Mad Decent and Because Music, intended to be the third single from their fourth studio album Music Is the Weapon, but it was then confirmed as the second single from their debut greatest hits album Major Lazer Essentials. The song was written by primary Major Lazer member Diplo, Stargate, PartyNextDoor, Minaj, and Phillip Meckseper, while the song's production was handled by Major Lazer, Stargate, and Jr Blender.

== Composition ==
"Run Up" has a length of three minutes and twenty-three seconds. According to the sheet music published by Kobalt Music Publishing America, Inc on Musicnotes.com, it's written in the key of E Major set in a 4/4 time signature at a moderate tempo of 108 beats per minute. The vocal range spans from the low note C♯_{3} to the high note C♯_{5}, while the music follows the chord progression of A–C♯_{m}–E–B. Musically, "Run Up" is a dancehall song. PartyNextDoor and Minaj sing using the Jamaican Patois accent.

== Reception ==
"Run Up" received generally positive reviews from music critics. Reviewing the song, Ryan Reed from Rolling Stone described it as "a suave blend of high-pitched vocal samples, warped guitar chords and a signature Caribbean music groove." Him praised the presence of Minaj and PartyNextDoor on the song, "PartyNextDoor croons smooth come-ons throughout the track, but Minaj amps up the intensity with a reliably boastful verse." Kat Being of Billboard call it as "a great follow-up to "Cold Water" (2016). Bianca Gracie from Fuse gave a positive review to the song, writing, "Minaj and Party bring their Trinidadian and Jamaican roots to the track, as the rapstress drops boastful verses laced with swagger, sex appeal and patois." The written also praised the vocal of the singer PartyNextDoor on the song, she wrote: "PartyNextDoor adds his crooning vocals to the opening and hook, which is backed by Major Lazer's island-tinged production."

Spin's Brian Josephs commented that the song used "dancehall-inspired production that Drake pimped and Tory Lanez bit." He also praised the feature vocalist on the song writing that "PartyNextDoor and Minaj are charismatic enough to make his a summer banger that’s dropped a couple of months early." Dani Schwartz of the site HotNewHipHop also gave a positive review to the song praising the choice of the singers in the song, she describing its as a "only natural, then, they enlist PartyNextDoor and Nicki Minaj, two artists with Caribbean roots."

== Charts ==
=== Weekly charts ===
Chart (2017)	Peak position
Australia (ARIA)	27
Austria (Ö3 Austria Top 40)	37
Belgium (Ultratop 50 Flanders)	31
Belgium (Ultratop 50 Wallonia)	33
Canada Hot 100 (Billboard)	20
Canada CHR/Top 40 (Billboard)	9
Canada Hot AC (Billboard)	48
ERROR in "CIS": Invalid position: 204. Expected number 1–200 or dash (–).
Colombia (National-Report)	99
Czech Republic Singles Digital (ČNS IFPI)	19
Denmark (Tracklisten)	23
Euro Digital Song Sales (Billboard)	20
France (SNEP)	16
France Airplay (SNEP)	3
Germany (GfK)	22
Hungary (Stream Top 40)	11
Ireland (IRMA)	25
Italy (FIMI)	41
Netherlands (Dutch Top 40)	16
Netherlands (Single Top 100)	14
New Zealand (Recorded Music NZ)	14
Norway (VG-lista)	27
Portugal (AFP)	21
Scottish Singles Sales (Official Charts)	24
Slovakia Airplay (ČNS IFPI)	44
Slovakia Singles Digital (ČNS IFPI)	16
Spain (PROMUSICAE)	100
Sweden (Sverigetopplistan)	23
Switzerland (Schweizer Hitparade)	25
UK Singles (Official Charts)	20
UK Independent (Official Charts)	1
US Billboard Hot 100	66
US Hot Dance/Electronic Songs (Billboard)	9
US Hot R&B/Hip-Hop Songs (Billboard)	26
US Pop Airplay (Billboard)	37
US Rhythmic Airplay (Billboard)	30

=== Year-end charts ===
Chart (2017)	Position
Canada (Canadian Hot 100)	74
France (SNEP)	88
Hungary (Stream Top 40)	78
Netherlands (Dutch Top 40)	94
Netherlands (Single Top 100)	75
Switzerland (Schweizer Hitparade)	92
US Hot Dance/Electronic Songs (Billboard)	25

== Certifications ==
Region	Certification	Certified units/sales
Australia (ARIA)	Platinum	70,000^{‡}
Denmark (IFPI Danmark)	Gold	45,000^{‡}
France (SNEP)	Platinum	133,333^{‡}
Germany (BVMI)	Gold	200,000^{‡}
Italy (FIMI)	Platinum	50,000^{‡}
New Zealand (RMNZ)	Platinum	30,000^{‡}
United Kingdom (BPI)	Platinum	600,000^{‡}
^{‡} Sales+streaming figures based on certification alone.

== Release history ==
Region	Date	Format	Label
Worldwide	January 26, 2017	Digital download	Mad Decent; Because
Italy	January 26, 2017	Contemporary hit radio	Warner
