= Titans (Major Lazer song) =

2021 single by Major Lazer featuring Sia and Labrinth

Single by Major Lazer featuring Sia and Labrinth

from the album Music Is the Weapon (Reloaded)
- Released: March 26, 2021
- Recorded: 2020–2021
- Genre: Moombahton; pop
- Length: 3:19
- Label: Mad Decent; Because Music
- Songwriters: Boaz van de Beatz; Philip Meckseper; Sia Furler; Thomas Pentz; Timothy McKenzie; Yonatan Goldstein
- Producer: Diplo

Major Lazer singles chronology
"Diplomatico" (2021)	"Titans" (2021)	"C'est Cuit" (2021)

Sia singles chronology
"Floating Through Space" (2021)	"Titans" (2021)	"Diamond Eyes" (2021)

Labrinth singles chronology
"Ave Maria" (2020)	"Titans" (2021)	"Yeh I Fuckin' Did It" (2022)

Music video
- "Titans" on YouTube

"Titans" is a song by American electronic trio Major Lazer featuring Australian singer-songwriter Sia and British singer-songwriter Labrinth. It was released on March 26, 2021, as a third single from the deluxe edition of their fourth studio album, Music Is the Weapon (Reloaded).

A VIP remix of "Titans" was featured in the soundtrack for the football video game by EA Sports, FIFA 22.

== Background and release ==
Major Lazer first teased “Titans” during their livestream event A Very Lazer Sunday on March 15, 2021. The track marks a reunion of the LSD trio — Sia, Diplo, and Labrinth — who previously collaborated on the LSD project in 2018.

== Composition ==
"Titans" combines moombahton rhythms, dancehall-inspired beats, and modern electronic production. The song features uplifting vocals by Sia and Labrinth over anthemic drops produced by Diplo.

== Music video ==
A special effects-heavy music video, directed by Ernest Desumbila, was released on April 1, 2021. It combines CGI, puppetry, and animation to depict Major Lazer embarking on a surreal, interplanetary adventure. After his spaceship is struck by one of two giant monsters attacking a city, introducing the antagonist from the animated TV series Major Lazer, General Rubbish, Major Lazer is knocked off course and crash-lands on Mars. There, he encounters Baby Yoda-style puppet versions of Sia and Labrinth, who help him train and acquire music-powered abilities. Major Lazer is subsequently captured by a trippy velociraptor-like humans before escaping and battling oversized cosmic eggs. After gaining new upgrades, he returns to Earth and confronts the two monsters, ultimately defeating them through the power of sound.

== Personnel ==
- Sia – vocals, songwriting
- Labrinth – vocals, songwriting
- Diplo – production, songwriting
- Boaz van de Beatz – production, songwriting
- Jr Blender – songwriting
- Johnny Goldstein – production, songwriting

== Charts ==
Weekly chart performance for "Titans"
Chart (2021)	Peak position
Belgium (Ultratip Bubbling Under Flanders)	20
France (SNEP)	108
Mexico Ingles Airplay (Billboard)	25
New Zealand Hot Singles (RMNZ)	17
Sweden Heatseeker (Sverigetopplistan)	2
Switzerland (Schweizer Hitparade)	82
US Hot Dance/Electronic Songs (Billboard)	16

== Certifications ==
Certifications for "Titans"
Region	Certification	Certified units/sales
France (SNEP)	Gold	100,000^{‡}
^{‡} Sales+streaming figures based on certification alone.

== Release history ==
Region	Date	Format	Version	Label	Ref.
Various	26 March 2021	Digital download; streaming	Original	Mad Decent; Because Music	
Various	21 May 2021	Digital download; streaming	Imanbek Remix	Mad Decent; Because Music	
