= Sofiya Nzau =

Kenyan singer and songwriter (born 1993)

- Born: Sofiya Wanjiku; 20 February 1993 (age 33); Miruri, Murang'a County, Kenya
- Genres: Afropop; electronic
- Occupations: Singer; songwriter

Sofiya Wanjiku (born 20 February 1993), is a Kenyan singer-songwriter, known by her stage name Sofiya Nzau.

== Career ==
Sofiya Nzau worked as a street vendor and domestic helper in Thika from 2015 to 2020. After the COVID-19 pandemic reached Kenya, she quit her jobs in December 2020 and became a songwriter. Her husband, a music producer, supported her. She wrote several songs in the Kikuyu language, which she uploaded as sound and language packages on various platforms for music producers.

In 2023, Brazilian DJ Zerb took her song "Mwaki", meaning fire in English, and remixed the song as house. The song spread via TikTok and eventually became a viral hit. When it turned out that the song would be an international hit, voices were raised accusing Zerb of exploitation. Nzau opposed this and said that she had chosen the distribution channel herself. In addition, she had made an agreement with Zerb from which she would benefit financially. She subsequently received a credit for the song in the commercial evaluation and is listed on an equal footing in the charts. In December 2023, she also performed the song live in Nairobi. In January 2024, the video for the song was shot in Hell's Gate National Park.

== Discography ==
=== EPs ===
- 2023: Family (26 Records)

=== Singles ===
- 2022: Hurt No More
- 2022: Kúra
- 2022: Daci (with Tim Hox & East & Young)
- 2023: Baobá (with Ramiro Moreno)
- 2023: Kenya (with El Porto)
- 2023: Mwaki (with Zerb)
- 2023: Saufiya
- 2023: Just Another Woman
- 2023: Mwanake (with Yuri Haal)
- 2023: Ouria Deka (with Touzani)
- 2023: Slow Down (with Muisumena)
- 2023: Dikoima (with Backeer & Elline)
- 2024: Sondans (with Basti Grub)
- 2024: Batié (with AllBallonsPop)
- 2024: Karimu (with Irenee S & Don Dala)
- 2024: Mationaga (with Louis Bongo)
- 2024: Issara (with Sohno)
- 2024: Jamuke (with Harjex)
- 2024: Na Wose (with UPZ)
- 2024: Maneye (with Swanky Tunes)
- 2024: Digane (with Bob Sinclar)
- 2025: Wacuka (with Avaion)
- 2025: Away (with Topic)
