= Blow That Smoke =

Single by Major Lazer featuring Tove Lo

from the album Major Lazer Essentials
- Released: October 17, 2018
- Genre: Dance; electropop; Afropop
- Length: 3:42
- Label: Mad Decent
- Songwriters: Maxime Picard; Phillip Meckseper; Ebba Tove Elsa Nilsson; Clement Picard; Jakob Jerlström; Ludvig Söderberg; Sibel Redžep; Thomas Wesley Pentz
- Producers: Diplo; Jr Blender; The Picard Brothers

Major Lazer singles chronology
"Loyal" (2018)	"Blow That Smoke" (2018)	"Can’t Take It From Me" (2019)

Tove Lo singles chronology
"Bitches" (2018)	"Blow That Smoke" (2018)	"Win Win" (2019)

"Blow That Smoke" is a song by American electronic music group Major Lazer featuring Swedish singer Tove Lo, released on October 17, 2018, as the seventh and final single from Major Lazer Essentials, released two days later. It was premiered on Zane Lowe's show on Beats 1. It marks the first collaboration between the group and Lo.

== Composition ==
"Blow That Smoke" is a tropical dance and electropop song rooted in Afropop with elements of dancehall and reggaeton. Tove Lo said she and the group "had a few sessions and tried to find more days together, but we're never in the same place long enough to actually make it work", so she sent Diplo her vocals for a song, which he liked and put to a track. Lo told Zane Lowe that she later heard the finished version of the song, which had been sped up about 10 BPM from what was a "very slow, moody song to begin with".

== Critical reception ==
Billboard's Marina Pedrosa called the song a "tropical dance anthem" as well as an "electropop tune" containing a "sultry beat with a dash of reggaeton" that Lo's "angelic voice" sings lyrics like "I got the keys to heaven now/Babes all around and they got my mind spinning" over. Mike Wass of Idolator positively contrasted the song with Lo's solo material, noting that on "Blow That Smoke" it sounds like she is having fun. Wass also stated that the song "sounds like a hit" and said Lo "coos over a mellow, island-inspired beat".

Writing for Dancing Astronaut, Chris Stack named it a continuation of Major Lazer's recent output "celebrating their Afrobeat roots" and also judged it had a "sultry island beat". Patrick Doyle of Rolling Stone felt that the song had "Afropop roots" as well as being a "bouncey stomper with a West African guitar riff and heavy groove". Winston Cook-Wilson of Spin named it a "Caribbean-flavored track that fits with Major Lazer's usual stylistic M.O. more closely than Tove Lo's usual, more acerbic sensibility". Jael Goldfine of Stereogum said it "might just be the lowest-key song either artist has ever made".

== Promotion ==
Both Lo and Major Lazer announced on social media that they would be releasing a collaboration in the same week, with Lo calling it a "sweet surprise" and sharing a snippet of the track.

== Charts ==
Weekly chart performance
Chart (2018–19)	Peak position
Belgium (Ultratop 50 Wallonia)	42
Bolivia (Monitor Latino)	20
Finland Airplay (Radiosoittolista)	50
New Zealand Hot Singles (RMNZ)	25
Slovakia Airplay (ČNS IFPI)	54
Sweden (Sverigetopplistan)	71
US Hot Dance/Electronic Songs (Billboard)	21

== Certifications ==
Certifications and sales
Region	Certification	Certified units/sales
Brazil (Pro-Música Brasil)	Gold	20,000^{‡}
^{‡} Sales+streaming figures based on certification alone.
