= Aerosol Can =

Single by Major Lazer featuring Pharrell Williams

from the album Apocalypse Soon
- Released: 14 February 2014
- Recorded: 2012–2013
- Genre: Dancehall; hip hop
- Length: 3:02
- Label: Major Lazer; Because
- Songwriters: Thomas Pentz; Pharrell Williams
- Producers: Boaz van de Beatz; Diplo

Major Lazer singles chronology
"Sweat" (2013)	"Aerosol Can" (2014)	"Come On to Me" (2014)

Pharrell Williams singles chronology
"Move That Dope" (2014)	"Aerosol Can" (2014)	"Marilyn Monroe" (2014)

"Aerosol Can" is a song produced and performed by Jamaican-American electronic music group Major Lazer featuring American musician Pharrell Williams. Williams co-wrote the song with Major Lazer member Diplo. The song was released as a single on 14 February 2014 and features on Major Lazer's 2014 extended play Apocalypse Soon. It became a top 40 single in Australia peaking at #37. It was featured in the soundtrack for the video games NBA 2K15 and Watch Dogs 2.

A remix contest was held for the track in April, in which the winner was announced in the end of May.

== Charts ==
Chart (2014)	Peak position
Australia (ARIA)	37
Belgium (Ultratip Bubbling Under Flanders)	32
Belgium Urban (Ultratop Flanders)	19
