= Step Out (Busy Signal album) =

Studio album by Busy Signal
- Released: June 27, 2006
- Recorded: 2005
- Genre: Reggae, dancehall
- Label: Greensleeves Records
- Producer: Dave Kelly (executive); Tony Kelly; DASECA Productions; C. Cunningham

Busy Signal chronology
| Step Out (2006) | Loaded (2008) |

Step Out is the debut album by Busy Signal. It was released on June 27, 2006.

== Track listing ==
1. "Step Out" – 2:57 download
2. "Where I'm From" – 2:24
3. "Everybody Busy" – 3:08
4. "That Bad" – 2:37
5. "I Love Yuh" (featuring Alaine) – 2:31
6. "Do the Maths" (featuring Bounty Killer) – 2:26
7. "Badman Place" (featuring Mavado) – 3:16
8. "Bare Tings" – 3:12
9. "Love Me Not?" – 3:39
10. "Ava Interlude" – 1:24
11. "Mammy" – 3:15
12. "Born and Grow" – 3:31
13. "Guns Fi Dubs Interlude" – 0:39
14. "Full Clip" (featuring Mavado) – 3:05
15. "Relationship Interlude" – 0:29
16. "Since U Been Away" (featuring Kris Kelly) – 2:46
17. "Full a Talk" – 3:00
18. "Not Going Down" – 6:52
19. "Pon Di Pole" (Bonus Track) * – 3:16
