= Zerb =

Brazilian DJ and producer (born 1997)

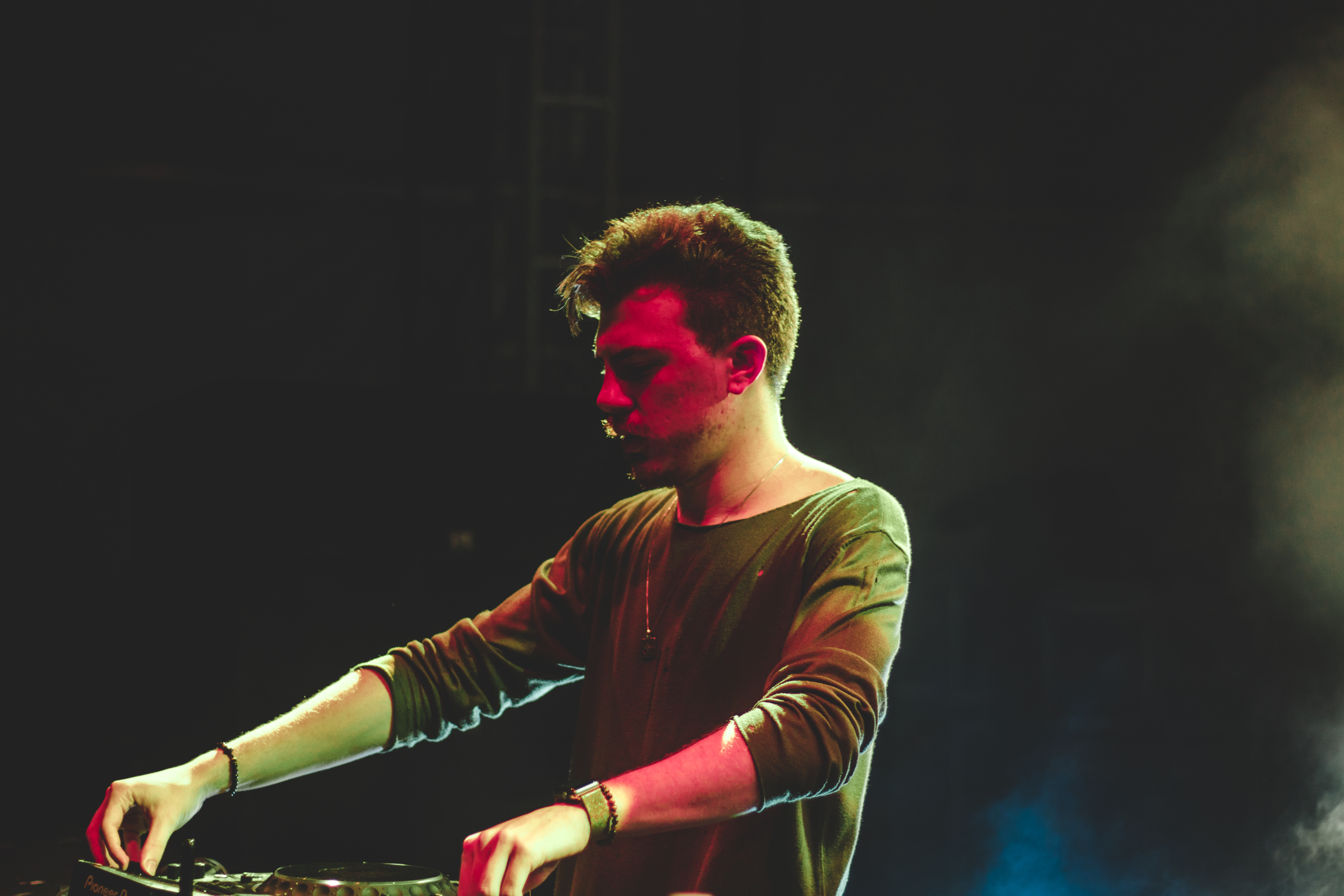
- Zerb in 2018

Background information
- Born: Matheus Zerbini Massa; 25 December 1997 (age 28); São Paulo, São Paulo, Brazil
- Genres: Electronic; tropical house; deep house; future house; pop
- Occupations: DJ; music producer
- Years active: 2012–present

Matheus Zerbini Massa (born 25 December 1997), known professionally as Zerb, is a Brazilian DJ and record producer. He is best known for his 2023 hit single "Mwaki".

== Early life ==
Matheus Zerbini Massa was born and raised in São Paulo. During his childhood, he learned to play various instruments such as guitar, drums and piano.

== Career ==
In 2012, at the age of 14, Zerb became interested in electronic music. Inspired by DJs like Skrillex and Deadmau5, he began producing his own songs and releasing them on his YouTube channel and SoundCloud. Initially, his productions contained elements of progressive house and big room.

In 2015, he began posting various remixes online, mixing elements of deep house and tropical house, attracting the attention of various artists in the scene. He caught the attention of Vintage Culture through a Facebook message and together they released a remix of ZHU's "Faded". With the success of the track, Zerb became part of the management Entourage and began performing throughout Brazil. That same year, Zerb was confirmed as one of the attractions for the 2016 edition of the Lollapalooza festival.

In 2016, while traveling around Brazil and performing at various parties and festivals, Zerb studied marketing at the University of São Paulo, graduating in 2019. In 2017, Zerb was confirmed as an artist for the Rock in Rio festival. In the second half of 2018, he released the song "With You" in collaboration with the Giulia Be. With elements of pop and tropical house, the song reached number 9 on the Spotify viral charts. In 2019, he released the song "Wherever U Wanna Go" with Júlia Gomes and DJs Sandeville and Duncan. In the same year, he released an acoustic version of the song with singer Fiuk.

In mid-2020, in collaboration with the Italian DJ Noto and the Dutch Marc Benjamin, Zerb released the song "Like 2 Party", which became amongs the best-selling electro house songs on the Beatport website. He is currently part of the event agency and production company Plus Network. Zerb achieved his mainstream breakthrough in 2023 with the song "Mwaki" featuring Kenyan singer Sofiya Nzau, in which the lyrics are performed in Kikuyu language. Nzau had vocal tracks and packages available for download on various websites and Zerb used her material for the track. The track went viral across various websites, including TikTok, and charted across Europe. The song was remixed by numerous DJs including Major Lazer and Tiësto.

== Discography ==
=== EPs ===
- Lonely Nights (2021)
- Still Unknown (2021)
- Surrender (2023)

=== Singles ===
- "Up" (2012)
- "Reasons" (2015)
- "Somebody Else" (with Thomaz Krauze, 2015)
- "Acid Booty" (2016)
- "Tell Me" (with Dubdogz, 2016)
- "Paradise" (2017)
- "Slow Motion" (with Pontifexx, 2018)
- "With You" (with Giulia Be, 2018)
- "Wherever U Wanna Go" (with Sandeville, Duncan and Júlia Gomes, 2019)
- "Wherever U Wanna Go" (acoustic; with Sandeville, Duncan, Júlia Gomes and Fiuk, 2019)
- "Belong" (with Sophia Stedile, 2019)
- "Sunlight" (with Ralk and Vitório, 2020)
- "Like 2 Party" (with Noto and Marc Benjamin, 2020)
- "Stay with Me" (2020)
- "Waste Your Time" (with Nonô, 2020)
- "Trouble's Gonna Find Me" (2021)
- "Alive" (with Mevil and Calvin Duo, 2021)
- "DNACID" (2022)
- "Shake for Me" (2022)
- "Round n Round" (with Dubdogz, 2022)
- "Winding Road" (with Kidd Thorn, 2022)
- "I Don't Know" (with 2Strange, 2023)
- "I'll Be Yours" (with Georgi Kay, 2023)
- "Surrender" (with Santti and Lia Rose, 2023)
- "Use Somebody" (with Sophia Stedile, 2023)
- "Mwaki" (featuring Sofiya Nzau, 2023)
- "Addicted" (with The Chainsmokers and Ink, 2024)
- "In Love Today" (2025)
- "If It’s Not Love" (with Rita Ora, 2025)

=== Remixes ===
- Zhu – "Faded" (Vintage Culture and Zerb remix) (2015)
- Joy Corporation – "Do You Remember" (Zerb remix) (2015)
- Vintage Culture and Woo2Tech – "Sometimes" (Zerb remix) (2016)
- Ookay – "Thief" (Zerb remix) (2017)
- Gnash and Olivia O'Brien – "I Hate U, I Love U" (Zerb remix) (2017)
- Lemaitre – "Higher" (Zerb remix) (2017)
- Musikk – "Summer Lovin'" (featuring John Rock) (Zerb and Hi-Cut remix) (2018)
- Sam Feldt and Alex Schulz – "Be My Lover" (Zerb remix) (2018)
- Diplo and Hugel – "Stay High" (featuring Julia Church) (Zerb remix) (2024)
- Coldplay – "Feelslikeimfallinginlove" (Zerb remix) (2024)
