= Particula =

2017 song by Major Lazer and DJ Maphorisa

Song by Major Lazer and DJ Maphorisa featuring Nasty C, Ice Prince, Patoranking and Jidenna

from the EP Know No Better
- Released: October 12, 2017
- Recorded: 2017
- Studio: Blenders Ends (Hamburg, Germany); Lazer Sound Studio (Los Angeles, CA); Fear & Fancy (Atlanta, Georgia)
- Genre: Electronic
- Length: 3:24
- Label: Mad Decent; Skink
- Songwriters: Philip Meckseper; Panshak Zamani; Jidenna Mobisson; Themba Sekowe; Nsikayezwe David Junior Ngcobo; Thomas Wesley Pentz; Patrick Okorie
- Producers: DJ Maphorisa; Major Lazer

Music video
- "Particula" on YouTube

"Particula" is a song performed by American electronic music trio Major Lazer and South African record producer DJ Maphorisa from the former’s EP Know No Better (2017). The song features vocals by South African rapper Nasty C, Nigerian artists Ice Prince and Patoranking, and Nigerian-American hip hop recording artist Jidenna.

== Background ==
"Particula" was released on October 12, 2017 on iTunes.

== Music video ==
The music video, directed by South African filmmaker Adriaan Louw, was unveiled on October 17, 2017 via the official YouTube channel of the band and major streaming networks. The visual offers an alternative view on a 70's inspired culture. The video was filmed and shot in Johannesburg, South Africa.As of April 2018, the video has surpassed 50 million views.

== Reception ==
Adriaan Louw of Word Africa Production in a press release said they "wanted it to feel like we were shooting a documentary in the 70's". He added, "I've always wanted to shoot a film like this in Johannesburg. It was creating an ideal world within Joburg that was based in the 70's. I wanted it to feel like we were shooting a documentary in the 70's of the culture that could have been in a city where Disco, Funk, Fela Kuti was everywhere. We worked with some great artist who featured on the track. Jidenna flew in all the way from the states and Ice Prince came down from Nigeria. Was also my first time working with fellow South African's Nasty C and DJ Maphorisa."

== Accolades ==
Awards and nominations for "Sade"
Organization	Year	Category	Result	Ref.
Soundcity MVP Awards Festival	2017	Best Collaboration	Nominated	
All Africa Music Awards	2018	Song of the Year	Nominated	
All Africa Music Awards	2018	Best African Collaboration	Nominated	
African Muzik Magazine Awards	2018	Song of the Year	Nominated	
African Muzik Magazine Awards	2018	Best Collaboration	Nominated	

== Credits and personnel ==
Credits adapted from YouTube.

- Adriaan Louw – Director
- Daniel Siegler – Executive Producer
- Allison Swank – Producer
- Thomas Revington – Director of Photography
- Tamzyn Botha – Art Director
- Xavier Van Der Westhuizen – Editor
- Matshepo Maja – Production Manager

== Charts ==
Chart performance for "Particula"
Chart (2017)	Peak position
US Hot Dance/Electronic Songs (Billboard)	42
US Reggae Digital Songs (Billboard)	2

== Certifications ==
Certifications for "Particula"
Region	Certification	Certified units/sales
Canada (Music Canada)	Platinum	80,000^{‡}
New Zealand (RMNZ)	Gold	15,000^{‡}
^{‡} Sales+streaming figures based on certification alone.
