= Apocalypse Soon =

EP by Major Lazer
- Released: February 25, 2014
- Recorded: 2012
- Genres: EDM; moombahton; electro house
- Length: 17:29
- Labels: Secretly Canadian; Mad Decent
- Producers: Major Lazer, Moska

Major Lazer chronology
| Free the Universe (2013) | Apocalypse Soon (2014) | Peace Is the Mission (2015) |

Singles from Apocalypse Soon
- 1. "Aerosol Can" Released: February 14, 2014; 2. "Come On to Me" Released: March 3, 2014

Professional ratings
Review scores
| Source | Rating |
|---|---|
| AllMusic | 4/5 stars |
| Alternative Press | 3.5/5 stars |
| Consequence of Sound | C- |
| entertainment.ie | 4/5 |
| New Zealand Herald | 4/5 stars |
| HipHopDX | XXXX |
| Pitchfork Media | 5.8/10 |
| Resident Advisor | 3.5/5 |

Apocalypse Soon is an extended play (EP) by American electronic dance music band Major Lazer. It was released in 2014 after the success of their 2013 studio album Free the Universe.

The EP includes 5 tracks featuring collaborations with a number of artists, notably Sean Paul and Pharrell Williams in addition to Machel Montano, RDX, Moska and Mr. Fox.

The song "Come On to Me" featuring Sean Paul charted in France and the Netherlands, whereas the track "Aerosol Can" featuring Pharrell Williams charted in Australia and Belgium. The EP itself charted in France and New Zealand.

== Track listing ==
| No. | Title | Length |
|---|---|---|
| 1. | "Aerosol Can" (featuring Pharrell) | 3:02 |
| 2. | "Come On to Me" (featuring Sean Paul) | 3:33 |
| 3. | "Sound Bang" (featuring Machel Montano) | 3:54 |
| 4. | "Lose Yourself" (featuring RDX and Moska) | 3:16 |
| 5. | "Dale Asi" (featuring Mr. Fox) | 4:46 |
| Total length: | | 18:31 |

- The EP also contains a digital booklet of the release

== Charts ==
| Chart (2014) | Peak position |
|---|---|
| French Albums (SNEP) | 141 |
| New Zealand Albums (RMNZ) | 28 |
| US Billboard 200 | 137 |
| US Top Dance Albums (Billboard) | 6 |
| US Independent Albums (Billboard) | 28 |
