= The Partysquad =

Dutch DJ production team

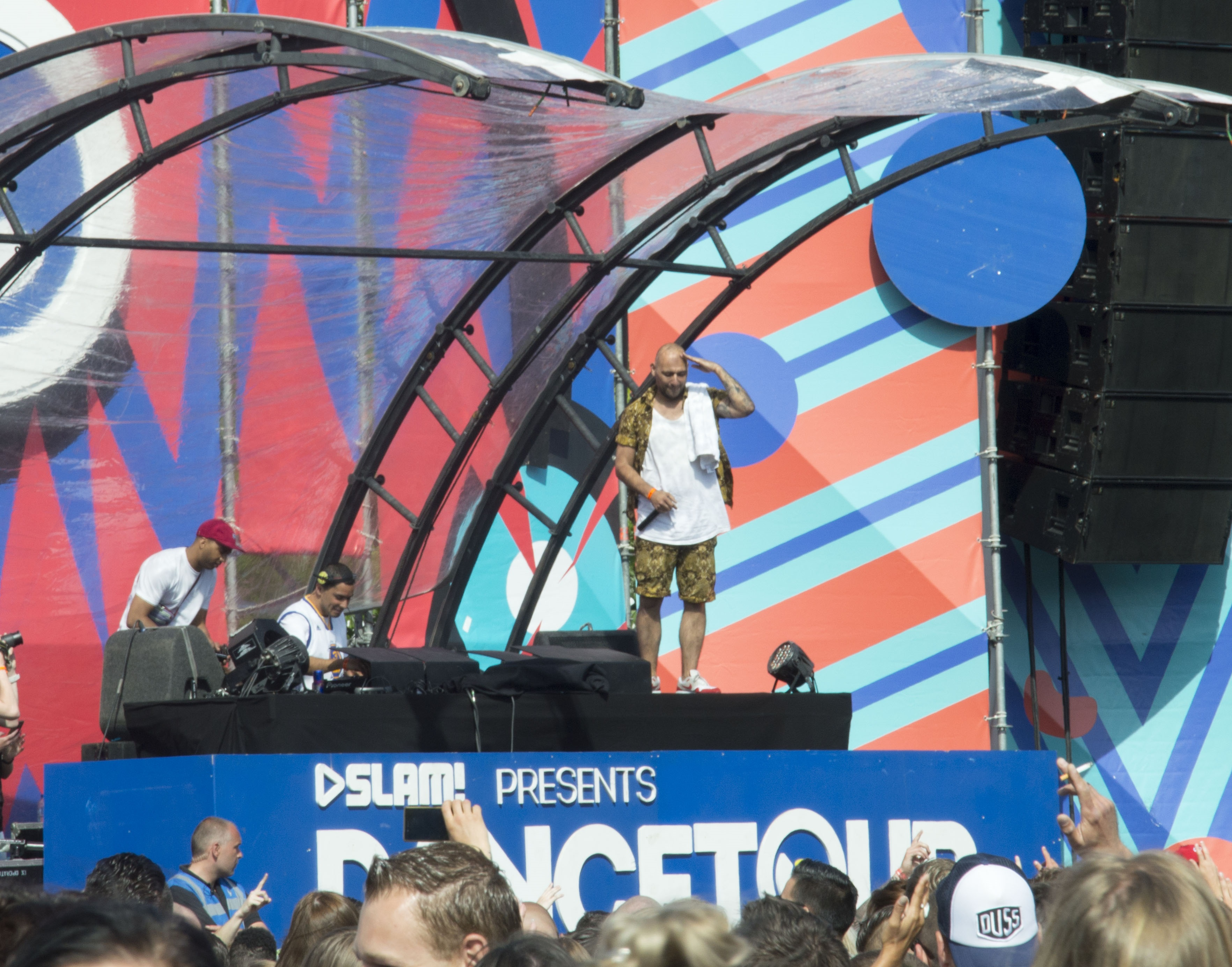
- The Partysquad playing live at Breda Dance Music Festival 2017

Background information
- Origin: Netherlands
- Genres: Dance, hip hop, electro house, hip house, reggae fusion, dub, trap, hardstyle, Dutch house
- Years active: 1998–present
- Labels: Universal, Mad Decent, Spinnin', Rebel Yard, TopNotch, Dim Mak, Warner Music Benelux
- Members: DJ Jerry; MC Ruben; MC Laurent
- Website: www.thepartysquad.com

The Partysquad is a Dutch DJ production team. It consists of Jerry Leembruggen, Ruben Fernhout and Lorenzo Biemans. Since the early 2000s they have had 12 singles charting on the Dutch Top 40. They produced part of British rapper M.I.A.'s fourth and fifth albums, Matangi, released in 2013, and AIM, released in 2016.

== Career ==
The Partysquad started producing in the hip hop genre, collaborating with many Dutch rappers. In 2006, they released a hip hop album titled De Bazen Van De Club. The album spawned 6 singles between 2006 and 2007, all of which charted on the Dutch Single Top 100 chart. The song "Rampeneren" with Ali B and Yes-R also peaked at No. 4 on the Dutch Top 40. "Wat Wil Je Doen" was featured on the soundtrack of the 2005 Dutch comedy film Het Schnitzelparadijs.

Since 2007, the group switched to producing in a wide range of music genres including electro house, reggae, dub and trap. They have performed as opening acts for 50 Cent, Kanye West and the Pussycat Dolls, among others.

In 2008, the group went on hiatus, after DJ Jerry had a car accident which left him in coma. As he recovered, the Partysquad made a comeback in 2010, collaborating with Afrojack for the single "A Msterdamn". In 2009, they signed to Diplo's record label Mad Decent and released their first international EP Hollertronix #10 under the label. Their breakthrough on the U.S. dance scene came with the reggae-influenced collaboration track with Major Lazer titled "Original Don". After the success of the song, the Partysquad created a 6-song EP Badman Rave EP, which expanded on the style of "Original Don". The group described their sound as "experimental rave EDM". The Partysquad created their own label Rebel Yard, as sub-label of Spinnin' Records. Among the artists signed to the label are DJs and producers Armand van Helden, A-Trak, Boaz, FS Green, Major Lazer and Yellow Claw, and rappers M.I.A., Sjaak and the Opposites.

In 2014, the Partysquad remixed "Dibby Dibby Sound" by DJ Fresh vs. Jay Fay featuring Ms. Dynamite.

In 2018, the Partysquad brought together more than sixty artists on their 20-track album Nachtwacht, including Ronnie Flex, Lil Kleine, Bizzey, Outsiders and Mr. Polska.

In 2021, MC Laurent joined the group and started performing live shows with DJ Jerry so MC Ruben could fully focus on making music. In 2022, they signed an exclusive licensing deal with Warner Music Benelux and released new Dutch singles including the titles "Antoon", "Broederliefde" and "LA$$A".

== Discography ==
=== Studio albums ===
- De Bazen Van De Club (2006)
- Nachtwacht (2018)

=== Extended plays ===
- Hollertronix #10 (2009)
- Badman Rave EP (2012)
- Wake M' Up EP (2014)

=== Singles ===
==== As lead artist ====
List of singles as lead artist, with selected chart positions, showing year released and album name
Title	Year	Peak chart positions	Album
Title	Year	NL	Album
"Wat Wil Je Doen" (featuring Willie Wartaal, SpaceKees, Darryl, Heist Rockah and The Opposites)	2005	12	De Bazen Van De Club
"I'm Sorry" (vs. RMXCRW featuring Gio)	2006	14	De Bazen Van De Club
"Non Stop" (featuring Brainpower)	2007	26	De Bazen Van De Club
"Stuk" (featuring Dio, Sef, Sjaak and Reverse)	2008	11	Non-album singles
"Drop Down (Do My Dance)" (with Afrojack)	2008	12	Non-album singles
"Licht van de Laser" (featuring Sef, Dio and Sjaak)	2009	11	Non-album singles
"A Msterdamn" (vs. Afrojack)	2010	86	Non-album singles
"Lucky Star" (with DJ Alvaro)	2010	89	Non-album singles
"Ik Ga Hard" (with Adje, Gers, Jayh and Reverse)	2011	8	Non-album singles
"Body Language (Ride)" (featuring Rochelle and Jayh)	2011	91	Non-album singles
"Helemaal Naar de Klote" (featuring Jayh, Sjaak and Reverse)	2013	14	Non-album singles
"#Pantsdown" (with Mitchell Niemeyer)	2013	71	Non-album singles
"P.o.v. 2.0" (with The Death Set featuring Diplo)	2013	—	Non-album singles
"C'est la vie" (featuring Josylvio, Bizzey, Hansie and Broertje)	2017	39	Non-album singles
"Lit" (featuring Equalz)	2018	28	Non-album singles
"Wat heb je nodig" (with Diztortion featuring Broederliefde)	2021	76	Non-album singles
"Hardcore Life" (with DJ Paul Elstak)	2024	8	Non-album singles
"—" denotes a single that did not chart or was not released in that territory.

Other releases

- "Showrocker" (with Bassjackers) (2010) (Spinnin)
- "My Bad" (with Roxy Cottontail) (2011) (Spinnin)
- "For Your Love" (with When Harry Met Sally & Caprice) (2011) (Spinnin)
- "Wataah" (with Alvaro) (2012) (Spinnin)
- "Tranga" (with Illuminati AMS) (2012) (Rebel Yard)
- "Oh My" (with Boaz van de Beatz) (2012) (Rebel Yard)
- "Alright" (with Tommie Sunshine) (2012)
- "The Lion" (2013) (Rebel Yard)
- "Sunset" (with Billy the Kit) (2013) (Rebel Yard)
- "How Many DJs" (with Dirtcaps) (2014) (Rebel Yard)
- "Born to Rave" (with Rob Pix) (2014) (Rebel Yard)
- "Dat Is Dat Ding" (featuring Jayh, Reverse, Cho, Bokoesam & Mocromaniac) (2015) (Top Notch)
- "ChanChan" (Rebel Yard) (2015)
- "Time to Rave" (with Punish) (Rebel Yard) (2015)
- "Bombshell" (featuring Maikal X) (Rebel Yard) (2015)
- "Mi Gal" (Rebel Yard) (2015)
- "Pum Pum" (Rebel Yard) (2016)
- "Lights Out" (with Alvaro) (Rebel Yard) (2016)
- "Bring You Home" (featuring James Francis) (Gemstone Records) (2018)

Remixes (known)

- Tommie Sunshine & Disco Fries ft. Kid Sister - "Cool Without You" (The Partysquad Remix)
- Clockwork - "Titan" (The Partysquad Remix)
- DJ Fresh vs. Jay Fay ft. Ms. Dynamite - "Dibby Dibby Sound" (The Partysquad Remix)
- Woot - "Don't You" (The Partysquad Remix)
- Punish & Ruthless - "FKN BASS" (The Partysquad Remix)
- Yellow Claw ft. Sjaak & Mr. Polska - "Krokobil" (The Partysquad Remix)

==== As featured artist ====
List of singles as featured artist, with selected chart positions, showing year released and album name
Title	Year	Peak chart positions	Album
Title	Year	NL	Album
"Rampeneren" (Ali B featuring Yes-R and The Partysquad)	2006	6	Petje Af
"Hard to Get" (Gio featuring Ali B, The Partysquad and Ambush)	2006	41	First
"Whoop Whoop" (DiceCream featuring The Partysquad, Reverse, Darryl and Sjaak)	2008	29	De Blaastest Het Album
"Original Don" (Major Lazer featuring The Partysquad)	2011	98	Original Don
"—" denotes a single that did not chart or was not released in that territory.

=== Guest appearances ===
List of non-single guest appearances, with other performing artists, showing year released and album name
Title	Year	Other artist(s)	Album
"Mash Up the Dance"	2013	Major Lazer, Ward 21	Free the Universe
"Rainbow"	2015	Modestep	London Road
