= Watch Out for This (Bumaye) =

Single by Major Lazer featuring Busy Signal, The Flexican and FS Green

from the album Free the Universe
- Released: February 26, 2013
- Recorded: 2012
- Genre: Moombahton; EDM; dancehall
- Length: 4:29 (album version); 3:27 (radio edit)
- Label: Mad Decent; Because
- Songwriters: Rubén Blades; Thomas Pentz; Reanno Gordon; Thomás Goethals
- Producers: Willie Colón; Major Lazer; The Flexican; FS Green

Major Lazer singles chronology
"Jah No Partial" (2012)	"Watch Out for This (Bumaye)" (2013)	"Bubble Butt" (2013)

Busy Signal singles chronology
"Come Shock Out" (2012)	"Watch Out for This (Bumaye)" (2013)

The Flexican singles chronology
"Watch Out for This (Bumaye)" (2013)

FS Green singles chronology
"Watch Out for This (Bumaye)" (2013)

Music video
- "Watch Out For This (Bumaye)" on YouTube

"Watch Out for This (Bumaye)" is a song performed by American electronic music group Major Lazer from their album Free the Universe. It features vocals from Jamaican singer Busy Signal and Dutch producers The Flexican and FS Green and was released on Diplo's Mad Decent label and the French Because Music label.

The song is a vocal version of the song "Bumaye" by The Flexican and FS Green, from The Flexican's 2011 release Yours Truly: The Mixtape Part II, which itself is a redux of the 2005 song of the same name originally by The Flexican and Typhoon. "Bumaye", as well as "Watch Out for This (Bumaye)", contains a sample of the song "María Lionza" by Willie Colón and Rubén Blades from their 1978 album Siembra and "Carnaval de Arequipa", written by the author Benigno Ballón Farfán from Peru. A remix version of the song features Puerto Rican reggaeton singer Daddy Yankee.

A remix EP was released for free in June 2013, featuring a variety of remixes and cover versions. Later, a remix by Flinch and a VIP remix by Ape Drums and 2Deep were both released for free.

The song was featured in trailers for French film Qu'est-ce qu'on a fait au Bon Dieu?, and was certified platinum in France by the UPFI in 2013.

They performed the song on 22 February 2026 at the closing ceremony of the Milan / Cortina Olympic Winter Games at the Verona Arena in Verona, Italy.

== Music video ==
The music video was filmed in Kingston, Jamaica by Jay Will (Game Over). It features various dancers performing typically Caribbean dance styles as well as wining. It also shows Busy Signal performing.

== Track listing ==
Watch Out for This (Bumaye) (Remixes) – EP
No.	Title	Length
1.	"Watch Out for This (Bumaye)" (Chocolate Puma Remix)	4:19
2.	"Watch Out for This (Bumaye)" (Supa Dups and Black Chiney Remix)	3:45
3.	"Watch Out for This (Bumaye)" (Hunter Siegel Remix)	4:28
4.	"Watch Out for This (Bumaye)" (YONNY CA$H Remix)	3:23
5.	"Watch Out for This (Bumaye)" (Ape Drums and 2Deep Remix)	4:49
6.	"Shell It Down" (featuring T.O.K.)	4:31
7.	"Desorden" (featuring Los Rakas)	4:48
8.	"This One is for You" (featuring Shurwayne Winchester)	4:23

Watch Out for This (Bumaye) (Ape Drums and 2Deep VIP Remix)
No.	Title	Length
1.	"Watch Out for This (Bumaye)" (Ape Drums and 2Deep VIP Remix)	4:49

Watch Out for This (Bumaye) (Flinch Remix)
No.	Title	Length
1.	"Watch Out for This (Bumaye)" (Flinch Remix)	4:06

Watch Out for This (Bumaye) (Daddy Yankee Remix)
No.	Title	Length
1.	"Watch Out for This (Bumaye)" (Daddy Yankee Remix)	4:26

== Charts ==
=== Weekly charts ===
Chart (2012–13)	Peak position
Australia (ARIA)	87
Austria (Ö3 Austria Top 40)	40
Belgium (Ultratop 50 Flanders)	5
Belgium (Ultratop Flanders Dance)	2
Belgium (Ultratop 50 Wallonia)	8
Belgium (Ultratop Wallonia Dance)	2
Denmark (Tracklisten)	14
France (SNEP)	4
Germany (GfK)	27
Hungary (Dance Top 40)	29
Hungary (Rádiós Top 40)	17
Israel (Media Forest)	4
Luxembourg Digital Song Sales (Billboard)	9
Netherlands (Dutch Top 40)	6
Netherlands (Single Top 100)	7
Netherlands (Mega Top 50)	9
Slovakia Airplay (ČNS IFPI)	64
Spain (PROMUSICAE)	46
Sweden (Sverigetopplistan)	38
Switzerland (Schweizer Hitparade)	23
UK Singles (OCC)	161
US Hot Dance/Electronic Songs (Billboard)	28

=== Year-end charts ===
Chart (2013)	Position
Belgium (Ultratop Flanders)	16
Belgium (Ultratop Wallonia)	22
France (SNEP)	20
Hungary (Dance Top 40)	85
Netherlands (Dutch Top 40)	22
Netherlands (Single Top 100)	33
US Hot Dance/Electronic Songs (Billboard)	64

Chart (2014)	Position
Hungary (Dance Top 40)	84

== Certifications ==
Region	Certification	Certified units/sales
Belgium (BRMA)	Platinum	30,000^{*}
France (SNEP)	Platinum	200,000^{‡}
Italy (FIMI)	Gold	15,000^{*}
Switzerland (IFPI Switzerland)	Gold	15,000^{^}
^{*} Sales figures based on certification alone.^{^} Shipments figures based on certification alone.^{‡} Sales+streaming figures based on certification alone.
