= Original Don =

Single by Major Lazer featuring the Partysquad
- Released: 4 November 2011
- Recorded: 2011
- Genre: Jumpstyle; dancehall
- Length: 4:13
- Label: Downtown
- Songwriters: Jasper Helderman; Jerry Leembruggen; David James Andrew Taylor; Ruben Fernhout; Thomas Wesley Pentz; Rodney Basil Price

Major Lazer singles chronology
"Jump Up" (2009)	"Original Don" (2011)	"Get Free" (2012)

"Original Don" is a song by musical project Major Lazer and the Partysquad from their 2011 extended play of the same name. It was released as a digital download on 4 November 2011. The song charted in the Netherlands.

== Background ==
An undished version of "Original Don" had surfaced on the Internet months before its official release. The song's initial cover artwork was inspired by the fictional character Don Draper.

== Music video ==
A music video to accompany the release of "Original Don" was first released onto YouTube on 8 December 2011 at a total length of two minutes and forty-two seconds. It features an American family, dancing around carrying various blade weapons. Diplo makes a cameo in the video.

== Track listing ==
Digital download
No.	Title	Length
1.	"Original Don"	4:13
2.	"Original Don" (Crookers Remix)	4:30
3.	"Original Don" (Diet Original Don)	4:52
4.	"Original Don" (The Partysquad and Punish Smash Em Remix)	3:38

== Chart performance ==
Chart (2012)	Peak position
Netherlands (Single Top 100)	98

== Release history ==
Region	Date	Format	Label
United Kingdom	4 November 2011	Digital download	Downtown

== In popular culture ==
A portion from the middle of the song was prominently featured in a television advertisement for The Cosmopolitan of Las Vegas, which aired in the summer of 2013 through the winter of 2013–14.

The version featuring the Partysquad appeared on Dancing with the Stars during James Maslow and Peta Murgatroyd's freestyle dance number.

Florida Gators gymnast, Bridget Sloan, used the song as her floor music for the 2015 season.
