= Know No Better (song) =

Single by Major Lazer featuring Travis Scott, Camila Cabello and Quavo

from the EP Know No Better
- Released: June 1, 2017
- Recorded: 2017
- Studio: Blenders Ends (Hamburg, Germany); Lazer Sound Studio (Los Angeles, CA)
- Genre: EDM; dancehall; moombahton
- Length: 3:45
- Label: Mad Decent
- Songwriters: Brittany Hazzard; Camila Cabello; Henry Allen; Jacques Webster II; Quavious Marshall; Thomas Pentz
- Producers: Diplo; King Henry; Jr Blender (add.)

Major Lazer singles chronology
"Run Up" (2017)	"Know No Better" (2017)	"Naughty Ride" (2017)

Travis Scott singles chronology
"Portland" (2017)	"Know No Better" (2017)	"Sky Walker" (2017)

Camila Cabello singles chronology
"Crying in the Club" (2017)	"Know No Better" (2017)	"Havana" (2017)

Quavo singles chronology
"Strip That Down" (2017)	"Know No Better" (2017)	"Sway" (2017)

Music video
- "Know No Better" on YouTube

"Know No Better" is a song by American musical trio Major Lazer featuring fellow American musicians Travis Scott, Camila Cabello, and Quavo. It was released on June 1, 2017, as the lead single of the former's EP of the same name. The song was written by the featured artists alongside Starrah, Major Lazer member Diplo, and King Henry, the latter two producing it with Jr Blender.

== Composition ==
"Know No Better" comprises grand piano chords, dancehall rhythms and pitch-shifted vocal samples.

== Critical reception ==
"Know No Better" received positive reviews from music critics. Jake Woolf of Pitchfork wrote that "Know No Better is a fine 2017 summer dance song. It’s guaranteed to be a hit, and it shows that Major Lazer can indeed make lightning strike twice," He added, "Using the same general song structure as 'Cold Water,' 'Know No Better' doesn’t feature a traditional chorus but a dance break led by a bubbly, buzzing synth. The bouncy piano-driven verses and the almost vocal-less chorus make for a sound that seems built for Ibiza vacations, rooftop raves, and 4AM DJ sets in the Hamptons—in other words, the places you’re likely to find Diplo and his fans all summer. Travis Scott, who has in the past year pivoted to become one of hip-hop’s best sing-first rappers, has never sounded more pop, using his signature ad-libs more sparingly than ever. He also swaps out traditional hip-hop bravado for boilerplate party lyrics (“Takin’ shots, pourin’ bottle after bottle after bottle/Yeah, hell nah, we ain’t sippin’ that, yah”)". Jonah Bromwich of Pitchfork also gave the song a positive review, stating that: "And as fun as it is at times, 'Know No Better' doubles as a testament to the result of spreading a handful of good ideas too thin."

== Accolades ==
Year	Organization	Award	Result	Ref.
2017	Teen Choice Awards	Choice Electronic/Dance Song	Won	
2018	WDM Radio Awards	Best Trending Track	Won	

== Track listing ==
Digital download
No.	Title	Length
1.	"Know No Better" (featuring Travis Scott, Camila Cabello and Quavo)	2:52

Digital download – Bad Bunny remix
No.	Title	Length
1.	"Know No Better" (featuring Travis Scott, Camila Cabello and Quavo) (Bad Bunny Remix)	3:00

Digital download – Afrojack remix
No.	Title	Length
1.	"Know No Better" (featuring Travis Scott, Camila Cabello and Quavo) (Afrojack Freemix)	4:10

Digital download – remixes EP
No.	Title	Length
1.	"Know No Better" (featuring Travis Scott, Camila Cabello and Quavo) (Bad Bunny Remix)	3:00
2.	"Know No Better" (featuring Travis Scott, Camila Cabello and Quavo) (Doobious Remix)	3:15
3.	"Know No Better" (featuring Travis Scott, Camila Cabello and Quavo) (BROHUG Remix)	3:43
4.	"Know No Better" (featuring Travis Scott, Camila Cabello and Quavo) (SLANDER Remix)	3:58
5.	"Know No Better" (featuring Travis Scott, Camila Cabello and Quavo) (Laibert Remix)	3:44
6.	"Know No Better" (featuring Travis Scott, Camila Cabello and Quavo) (DJ Zinc Remix)	4:32
7.	"Know No Better" (featuring Travis Scott, Camila Cabello and Quavo) (La Fuente Remix)	4:01
8.	"Know No Better" (featuring Travis Scott, Camila Cabello and Quavo) (Super Cruel Remix)	3:39

Compilation – A Very Decent Christmas 5
No.	Title	Length
1.	"Know No Better" (featuring Travis Scott, Camila Cabello and Quavo) (Walshy Fire X Megatone Remix)	4:16

== Music video ==
The official lyric video for "Know No Better" was uploaded to Major Lazer's YouTube channel on June 1, 2017.

The song's music video premiered on July 11. The clip follows a young aspiring dancer who is going through an awkward adolescent phase, morning routines and bullying at school, but dreams of being one of Major Lazer's back-up dancers. It features cameos by Cabello, Scott and Major Lazer members. Daydreaming works as his escape, since the one constant between both worlds is his love of dance, as noted by writer Ryan Reed of Rolling Stone. An interactive version of this video, directed by Philip Andelman, was released on July 28 and hosted by interactive-video people Eko, where users (just like the boy does in the original) can switch between the "dream" and "reality" storylines.

== Credits and personnel ==
Credits adapted from the liner notes of Know No Better.

Publishing

- Published by I Like Turtles / SONGS Music Publishing (ASCAP), Songs Music Publishing LLC o/b/o Duke City Music / Songs Music Publishing (SESAC), People Over Planes/These Are Songs of Pulse (ASCAP), Huncho YRN Music (ASCAP) / Quality Control QC Pro (ASCAP) Universal Music Corp. (ASCAP), Maidmetal Limited / Milamoon Songs – Administered by Sony/ATV Songs LLC (BMI), La Flame Enterprises (BMI)
- Travis Scott appears courtesy of G.O.O.D. Music/Def Jam, Epic Records/Sony Music Entertainment, Grand Hustle
- Camila Cabello appears courtesy of Epic Records
- Quavo appears courtesy of Quality Control Music

Recording

- Recorded at Blenders Ends (Hamburg, Germany)
- Camila Cabello vocal recorded at Lazer Sound Studio (Los Angeles, CA)
- Quavo vocals recorded at Lazer Sound Studio (Los Angeles, CA)
- Mixed at Mixstar Studios (Virginia Beach, Virginia)
- Mastered at Derkart Mastering (Los Angeles, CA)

Personnel

- Diplo – DJ, songwriting, production
- King Henry – DJ, songwriting, production
- Travis Scott – vocals, songwriting
- Camila Cabello – vocals, songwriting
- Quavo – vocals, songwriting
- Starrah – songwriting
- Serban Ghenea – mixing
- John Hanes – engineering
- Mike Dell – mastering
- Jr Blender – additional production

== Charts ==
=== Weekly charts ===
Chart (2017)	Peak position
Australia (ARIA)	34
Austria (Ö3 Austria Top 40)	45
Belgium (Ultratop 50 Flanders)	37
Belgium (Ultratop 50 Wallonia)	43
Canada Hot 100 (Billboard)	30
Canada CHR/Top 40 (Billboard)	48
CIS Airplay (TopHit)	96
Colombia (National-Report)	74
Czech Republic Singles Digital (ČNS IFPI)	25
Denmark (Tracklisten)	21
Finland Download (Latauslista)	15
France (SNEP)	18
Germany (GfK)	40
Hungary (Stream Top 40)	20
Ireland (IRMA)	19
Italy (FIMI)	47
Mexico Airplay (Billboard)	47
Netherlands (Dutch Top 40)	16
Netherlands (Single Top 100)	27
New Zealand (Recorded Music NZ)	28
Philippines (Philippine Hot 100)	45
Poland Airplay (ZPAV)	30
Portugal (AFP)	28
Scottish Singles Sales (Official Charts)	24
Slovakia Airplay (ČNS IFPI)	92
Slovakia Singles Digital (ČNS IFPI)	19
Spain (Promusicae)	28
Sweden (Sverigetopplistan)	30
Switzerland (Schweizer Hitparade)	30
UK Singles (Official Charts)	15
UK Indie (Official Charts)	1
US Billboard Hot 100	87
US Dance Club Songs (Billboard)	31
US Hot Dance/Electronic Songs (Billboard)	9
US Hot R&B/Hip-Hop Songs (Billboard)	36
US Pop Airplay (Billboard)	26
US Rhythmic Airplay (Billboard)	31

=== Year-end charts ===
Chart (2017)	Position
Belgium (Ultratop Flanders)	100
Canada (Canadian Hot 100)	100
Hungary (Stream Top 40)	88
Netherlands (Dutch Top 40)	63
Netherlands (Single Top 100)	96
Portugal (AFP)	86
US Hot Dance/Electronic Songs (Billboard)	21

== Certifications ==
Region	Certification	Certified units/sales
Australia (ARIA)	2× Platinum	140,000^{‡}
Belgium (BRMA)	Gold	10,000^{‡}
Brazil (Pro-Música Brasil)	Gold	30,000^{‡}
Denmark (IFPI Danmark)	Gold	45,000^{‡}
France (SNEP)	Platinum	133,333^{‡}
Italy (FIMI)	Platinum	50,000^{‡}
New Zealand (RMNZ)	2× Platinum	60,000^{‡}
Spain (Promusicae)	Gold	20,000^{‡}
United Kingdom (BPI)	Platinum	600,000^{‡}
United States (RIAA)	Gold	500,000^{‡}
^{‡} Sales+streaming figures based on certification alone.
