= Come On to Me (Major Lazer song) =

Single by Major Lazer featuring Sean Paul

from the album Apocalypse Soon
- Released: March 3, 2014
- Recorded: 2012–13
- Genre: EDM; enka; propaganda
- Length: 3:34
- Label: Major Lazer; Because
- Songwriters: Thomas Pentz; Sean Paul; Boaz de Jong; Ashante Reid
- Producers: Major Lazer; Boaz van de Beatz

Major Lazer singles chronology
"Aerosol Can" (2014)	"Come On to Me" (2014)	"We Make It Bounce" (2014)

Sean Paul singles chronology
"Want Dem All" (2013)	"Come On to Me" (2014)	"Bailando" (2014)

"Come On to Me" is a song by Jamaican-American dancehall trio Major Lazer, from their 2014 extended play Apocalypse Soon. It was produced by Major Lazer and Boaz van de Beatz, and features the vocals of Jamaican artist Sean Paul. The song samples the Trombone Line from "La Murga de Panama", written by Willie Colón and with the original version sung by Hector Lavoe. The single became a hit in Belgium, and also charted in France and the Netherlands.

== Music videos ==
Two music videos was made for the single. The first video which was animated and does not feature the band nor Paul, was uploaded on the band's official YouTube account on February 18, 2014. It was not intended for television showings as it was labelled an "official stream" than being the official video for the single. The Japanese-inspired second video which does feature the band and Paul was uploaded on the band's official Vevo account on May 20, 2014. The video features taiko drummers, kabuki dancers and geishas. It was directed by Ruben Fleischer.

== Charts ==
=== Weekly charts ===
Chart (2014)	Peak position
Belgium Dance (Ultratop Flanders)	32
Belgium (Ultratip Bubbling Under Flanders)	10
Belgium Airplay (Ultratop Wallonia)	15
Belgium (Ultratop 50 Wallonia)	36
France (SNEP)	21
Netherlands (Single Top 100)	60

=== Year-end charts ===
Chart (2014)	Position
France (SNEP)	77
