= Busy Signal =

Jamaican dancehall reggae artist (born 1979)

Reanno Devon Gordon (born 24 January 1979), better known by his stage name Busy Signal, is a Jamaican dancehall reggae artist.

== Biography ==
Reanno Devon Gordon, also known as Busy Signal, was born in Saint Ann Parish, living in areas in West and East Kingston such as Tivoli Gardens, Kingston, Papine, and Spanish Town. He is a past student of Brown's Town Comprehensive High School. Known as one of the artists leading the contemporary dancehall movement, Busy Signal has been a large part of the scene since 2003, and released his debut single "Step Out" in 2005. A music video for "Step Out" was released shortly afterwards.

He was nicknamed Busy Signal by his friends because he is constantly busy. His hit tracks for 2007/2008 were "Nah Go A Jail Again", "Smoke Some High Grade", "Tic Toc" and the track entitled "Unknown Number" has made tremendous airplay and dancehall reviews especially in the Caribbean and the US. He has released a hit dancehall album entitled Step Out.

On 22 September 2008, Busy Signal released his second studio album titled Loaded, a 15-track compilation on VP Records of well known dancehall hits such as "Jail", "Whine Pon Di Edge", "These Are the Days", among others, as well as never-heard-before exclusive tracks such as "People So Evil" and "Hustle Hard".

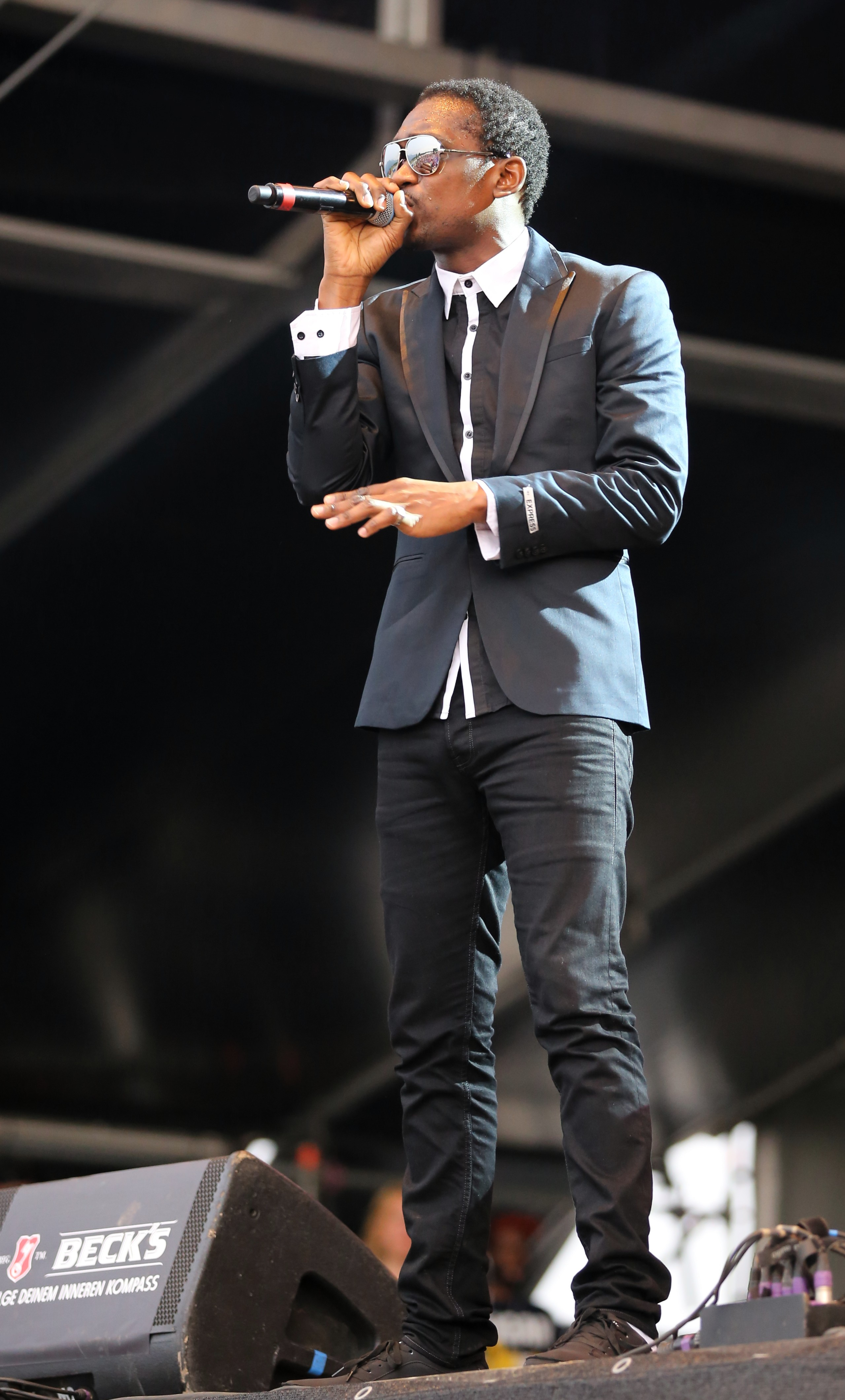
Busy Signal (Chiemsee Reggae Summer 2013)

The artist announced the introduction of a self-styled clothing line in 2011.

On 21 May 2012, Gordon was arrested at the Norman Manley International Airport in Jamaica due to an extradition warrant from the United States. He was extradited to the US on 19 June where he faced cocaine-related charges. In September 2012 he received a six-month prison sentence. He was released in November, and promptly released the single "Come Shock Out". BBC Music ranked Reggae Music Again No. 7 on their Top 25 Albums of 2012 listing. Busy Signal appears on the No Doubt album, Push and Shove, collaborating with the band and the production team Major Lazer on the title track. He also appears on Major Lazer's second album Free the Universe, in the track "Watch Out For This (Bumaye)", which was a hit single in several European countries. In 2014, he made "Sports Day: Everyone Move", however, he pirated music off of Hatsune Miku's cover of the Internet sensation Ievan Polkka. His Parts of the Puzzle album was released on 4 October 2019 on VP Records. It entered the Billboard Reggae Albums chart at number 2.

== Discography ==
=== Albums ===
- 2005: Step Out (Greensleeves)
- 2008: Loaded (VP)
- 2010: D.O.B. (VP) – US Reggae no. 12
- 2012: Reggae Music Again (VP) – US Reggae no. 5
- 2019: Parts of the Puzzle (VP) – US Reggae no. 2

=== Singles ===
==== As a lead artist ====
- 2005: "Step Out"
- 2008: "Tic Toc"
- 2010: "One More Night/Night Shift"
- 2011 : "Kingston Town" (feat. Damian "Jr. Gong" Marley)
- 2012: "Come Shock Out"
- 2013: "Why I Sing"
- 2013: "Danger Zone"
- 2014: "Professionally"
- 2014: "Sports Day: Everybody Move"
- 2014: "Money Flow" (feat. Eek-A-Mouse)

==== As a featured artist ====
| Year | Title | Peak chart positions | | | | | | | | | | Album |
| Year | Title | AUT | BEL (Vl) | BEL (Wa) | DEN | FRA | NL | SWE | SWI | NG | SPA | Album |
|---|---|---|---|---|---|---|---|---|---|---|---|---|
| 2012 | "Push and Shove" (No Doubt featuring Busy Signal and Major Lazer) | — | — | — | — | — | — | — | — | — | — | No Doubt album Push and Shove |
| 2013 | "Watch Out for This (Bumaye)" (Major Lazer featuring Busy Signal, The Flexican and FS Green) | 40 | 5 | 8 | 14 | 4 | 7 | 45 | 23 | — | 46 | Major Lazer album Free the Universe |
| 2015 | "Riding Solo"(Joyner Lucas feat. Busy Signal) | — | — | — | — | — | — | — | — | — | — | Joyner Lucas albumAlong Came Joyner |
| 2016 | "Key to the city" (Tiwa Savage featuring Busy Signal) | — | — | — | — | — | — | — | — | 1 | — | Tiwa Savage album R.E.D |
| 2018 | "Loko" (Tropkillaz and Major Lazer featuring MC Kevinho and Busy Signal) | — | — | — | — | — | — | — | — | — | — | |
| 2019 | "Santa Maria" (Bad Gyal featuring Busy Signal) | — | — | — | — | — | — | — | — | — | 14 | |
