= Diplo discography =

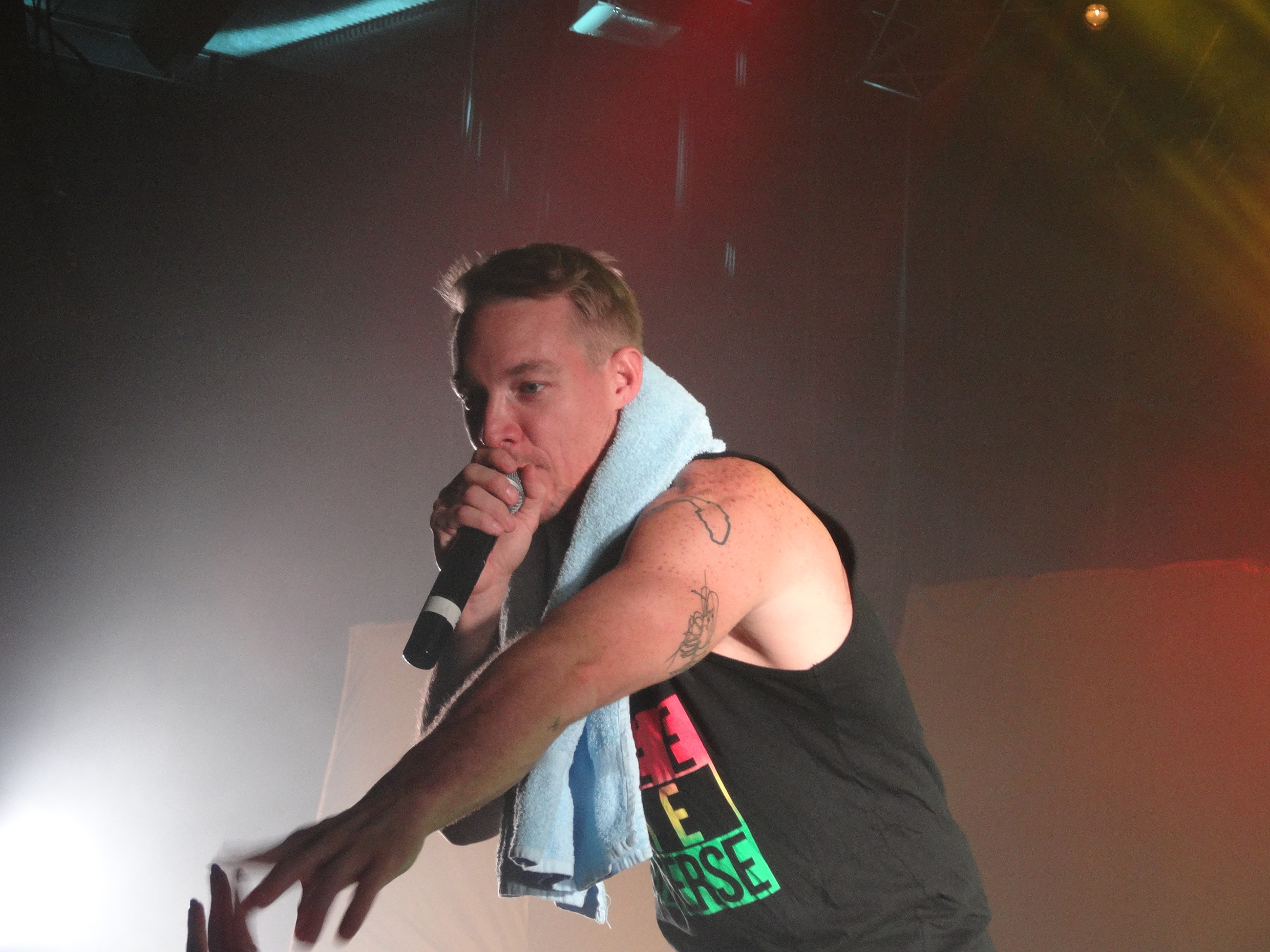
- Diplo performing in 2015
- Studio albums: 6
- EPs: 10
- Live albums: 1
- Compilation albums: 6
- Singles: 44
- Mixtapes: 6
- Collaborative: 2

American DJ and record producer Diplo has released six solo studio albums, two collaborative studio albums, ten EPs, six compilation albums, six mixtapes, one live album and a series of singles, music videos and other appearances. His alias, short for Diplodocus, derives from his childhood fascination with dinosaurs. During his rise to fame, Diplo worked with British musician M.I.A., an artist who is credited with giving him exposure in his early career. Since then, Diplo has worked on production and mixtape projects with many other pop artists, such as Die Antwoord, Britney Spears, Madonna, Shakira, Beyoncé, No Doubt, Justin Bieber, Usher, Snoop Dogg, Chris Brown, CL, and G-Dragon. As an artist, Diplo, combined with his other collaborations Major Lazer, Jack Ü and Silk City, three electronic groups.

== Albums ==
=== Solo Studio albums ===
Title	Album details	Peak chart positions					Certifications
Title	Album details	US	US Cou.	US Dance	AUS	CAN	Certifications
Florida	Released: September 21, 2004; Label: Big Dada; Formats: CD, LP, digital download	—	—	—	—	—	
Chapter 1: Snake Oil (as Thomas Wesley)	Released: May 29, 2020; Label: Mad Decent, Columbia; Formats: Digital download, streaming	50	6	—	83	20	RIAA: Platinum; MC: Platinum
MMXX	Released: September 4, 2020; Label: Higher Ground; Formats: Digital download, streaming	—	—	—	—	—	
Diplo	Released: March 4, 2022; Label: Higher Ground, Mad Decent; Formats: Digital download, streaming	—	—	2	100	—	
Chapter 2: Swamp Savant (as Thomas Wesley)	Released: April 28, 2023; Label: Mad Decent, Columbia; Formats: Digital download, streaming	—	—	—	—	—	
D00mscrvll (as D00mscrvll)	Released: January 9, 2026; Label: d00mscrvll, Black 17 Media; Formats: Digital download, streaming	—	—	—	—	—	
"—" denotes a recording that did not chart or was not released.

=== Collaborative studio albums ===
List of collaborative studio albums, with selected chart positions and certifications
Title	Details	Peak chart positions								Certifications
Title	Details	US	US Dance	AUS	CAN	GER	IRL	NZ	UK	Certifications
Jack Ü (with Skrillex as Jack Ü)	Released: February 27, 2015; Label: Owsla, Mad Decent, Atlantic; Formats: CD, LP, digital download, streaming	26	1	12	23	—	—	15	131	RIAA: Platinum; MC: Platinum; RMNZ: Gold
LSD (with Labrinth and Sia as LSD)	Released: April 12, 2019; Label: Columbia; Formats: CD, LP, digital download, streaming	70	—	49	33	49	45	35	44	Pro-Música Brasil: Platinum; IFPI Norge: Gold

=== Compilation albums ===
List of compilation albums, with selected chart positions
Title	Album details	Peak chart positions				
Title	Album details	US	US Dance	US Indie	US Reggae	BEL (FL)
FabricLive.24	Released: November 1, 2005; Format: CD, digital download; Label: Fabric	—	—	—	—	—
Decent Work for Decent Pay	Released: January 26, 2009; Format: CD, digital download; Label: Big Dada	—	23	—	—	—
Blow Your Head: Diplo Presents Dubstep	Released: November 2, 2010; Format: CD, digital download; Label: Mad Decent	—	20	—	—	—
Chasing the Dragon	Released: July 30, 2010; Format: CD, digital download; Label: Mad Decent	—	—	—	—	—
Riddimentary: Diplo Selects Greensleeves	Released: May 12, 2011; Format: CD, digital download; Label: Greensleeves	—	—	—	5	—
Random White Dude Be Everywhere	Released: July 29, 2014; Format: CD, digital download; Label: Mad Decent	155	2	24	—	132
"—" denotes releases that did not chart or were not released in that territory.

=== Mixtapes ===
List of mixtapes, with release date and label shown
Title	Album details
AEIOU (with Tripledouble)	Released: 2003; Format: CD, digital download; Label: Independent
Piracy Funds Terrorism (with M.I.A.)	Released: December 2, 2004; Format: Digital download; Label: Independent
AEIOU Two (with Tripledouble)	Released: 2007; Format: CD, digital download; Label: Independent
Top Ranking: A Diplo Dub (with Santigold)	Released: July 15, 2008; Format: Digital download; Label: Mad Decent
The Mixtape (as Thomas Wesley)	Released: April 26, 2024; Format: Digital download, streaming; Label: Mad Decent
D00mscrvll, Vol. 1 (as D00mscrvll)	Released: October 31, 2025; Format: Digital download, streaming; Label: Mad Decent

=== Live albums ===
List of live albums, with release date and label shown
Title	Album details
Live in Montreal	Released: September 4, 2005; Format: CD, digital download; Label: Money Studies

== Extended plays ==
List of EPs, with selected chart positions
Title	EP details	Peak chart positions							
Title	EP details	US	US Dance	US Indie	US R&B/HH	AUS	CAN	IRL	NZ
Epistomology	Released: November 11, 2003; Format: Digital download; Label: Big Dada	—	—	—	—	—	—	—	—
Newsflash	Released: October 8, 2004; Format: Digital download; Label: Big Dada	—	—	—	—	—	—	—	—
Diplo Rhythm	Released: September 21, 2004; Format: Digital download; Label: Big Dada	—	—	—	—	—	—	—	—
iTunes Session	Released: July 2, 2007; Format: Digital download; Label: Mad Decent	—	—	—	—	—	—	—	—
Express Yourself	Released: June 12, 2012; Format: Digital download; Label: Mad Decent	197	8	32	—	—	—	—	—
Revolution	Released: October 8, 2013; Format: Digital download; Label: Mad Decent	68	2	14	—	—	—	—	—
California	Released: March 23, 2018; Format: Digital download; Label: Mad Decent	62	—	48	31	58	39	65	27
Europa	Released: February 22, 2019; Format: Digital download; Label: Mad Decent	—	—	—	—	—	—	—	—
Higher Ground	Released: May 2, 2019; Format: Digital download; Label: Mad Decent	—	23	—	—	—	—	—	—
Do Si Do	Released: April 17, 2020; Format: Higher Ground; Label: Mad Decent	—	—	—	—	—	—	—	—
Do You Dance?	Released: March 12, 2021; Format: Digital download; Label: Higher Ground	—	18	—	—	—	—	—	—
"—" denotes releases that did not chart or were not released in that territory.

== Singles ==
=== As lead artist ===
List of singles as lead artist, with selected chart positions and certifications
Title	Year	Peak chart positions										Certifications	Album
Title	Year	US	US Dance	AUS	BEL (FL)	CAN	GER	IRL	NLD	NZ	UK	Certifications	Album
"Thingamajawn"	2003	—	—	—	—	—	—	—	—	—	—		Non-album singles
"Mitch Theme"	2004	—	—	—	—	—	—	—	—	—	—		Non-album singles
"Florida"	2004	—	—	—	—	—	—	—	—	—	—		Florida
"Shhake It Up"	2006	—	—	—	—	—	—	—	—	—	—		Non-album singles
"Blow Your Head"	2008	—	— (Note: "Blow Your Head" did not enter the US Hot Dance/Electronic Songs chart but peaked at number two on the Dance Singles Sales chart.)	—	—	—	—	—	—	—	—		Non-album singles
"Get Off" (with Blaqstarr)	2009	—	—	—	—	—	—	—	—	—	—		Non-album singles
"Hey!" (with Laidback Luke)	2009	—	—	—	—	—	—	—	—	—	—		Non-album singles
"Make You Pop" (with Don Diablo)	2010	—	—	—	—	—	—	—	—	—	—		Non-album singles
"U Don't Like Me" (featuring Lil Jon)	2010	—	—	—	—	—	—	—	—	—	—		Non-album singles
"C'mon (Catch 'Em by Surprise)" (with Tiësto featuring Busta Rhymes)	2011	—	— (Note: "C'mon (Catch 'Em by Surprise)" did not enter the US Hot Dance/Electronic Songs chart but peaked at number 4 on the Dance Singles Sales chart.)	—	39	68	68	21	8	—	13	BPI: Silver	Non-album singles
"Pick Your Poison" (with Datsik)	2011	—	—	—	—	—	—	—	—	—	—		Non-album singles
"Que Que" (with Dillon Francis featuring Maluca Mala)	2011	—	—	—	—	—	—	—	—	—	—		Non-album singles
"Go" (with Diplo and Oliver Twizt)	2011	—	—	—	—	—	—	—	—	—	—		Non-album singles
"Express Yourself" (featuring Nicky da B)	2012	—	44	—	—	—	—	—	—	—	—		Express Yourself
"Set It Off" (featuring Lazerdisk Party Sex)	2012	—	—	—	—	—	—	—	—	—	—		Express Yourself
"About That Life" (featuring Jahan Lennon)	2012	—	—	—	—	—	—	—	—	—	—		Non-album single
"Bueller" (with ETC!ETC! and Brillz featuring Chuck Inglish)	2012	—	—	—	—	—	—	—	—	—	—		Let's Be Cops
"Keep It Gully" (with Swick)	2013	—	—	—	—	—	—	—	—	—	—		Non-album singles
"Earthquake" (with DJ Fresh featuring Dominique Young Unique)	2013	—	26	—	21	—	—	—	42	—	4	BPI: Silver	Non-album singles
"Boy Oh Boy" (with GTA)	2013	—	19	—	—	— (Note: "Boy Oh Boy" did not enter the Canadian Hot 100 but peaked at number 71 on the Canadian Digital Song Sales.)	—	—	—	—	52		Random White Dude Be Everywhere
"Crown" (featuring Mike Posner and Boaz van de Beatz)	2013	—	—	—	—	—	—	—	—	—	—		Revolution
"Revolution" (featuring Faustix & Imanos and Kai)	2014	—	20	—	—	—	—	—	—	—	—	RIAA: Gold; RMNZ: Gold	Revolution
"Biggie Bounce" (featuring Angger Dimas and Travis Porter)	2014	—	36	—	—	—	—	—	—	—	—		Revolution
"Freak" (with Steve Aoki and Deorro)	2014	—	33	—	118	—	—	—	—	—	—		Random White Dude Be Everywhere
"6th Gear" (with Alvaro featuring Kstylis)	2014	—	—	—	—	—	—	—	—	—	—		Random White Dude Be Everywhere
"Techno" (with Yellow Claw and LNY TNZ featuring Waka Flocka Flame)	2014	—	—	—	—	—	—	—	—	—	—		Random White Dude Be Everywhere
"Dirty Vibe" (with Skrillex featuring G-Dragon and CL)	2014	—	15	—	—	—	—	—	—	—	—		Recess
"Doctor Pepper" (with CL, Riff Raff and OG Maco)	2015	—	—	—	—	—	—	—	—	—	—		Non-album singles
"Set Me Free" (featuring Liz)	2015	—	—	—	—	—	—	—	—	—	—		Non-album singles
"Be Right There" (with Sleepy Tom)	2015	— (Note: "Be Right There" did not enter the Billboard Hot 100, but peaked at number seven on the Bubbling Under Hot 100 Singles chart.)	8	34	19	81	69	31	83	19	8	RIAA: Gold; BPI: Platinum; RMNZ: 2× Platinum	Non-album singles
"Blame" (with Zeds Dead featuring Elliphant)	2016	—	32	—	—	—	—	—	—	—	—		Northern Lights
"Hey Baby" (vs. Dimitri Vegas & Like Mike featuring Deb's Daughter)	2016	—	30	—	1	—	65	—	—	—	—		Non-album singles
"Bang Bang" (vs. DJ Fresh featuring R. City, Selah Sue and Craig David)	2016	—	—	—	35	—	—	—	—	—	—		Non-album singles
"Imperfections" (with Starrah)	2017	—	—	—	—	—	—	—	—	—	—		Starrah X Diplo
"Phurrr" (with Pritam and Mohit Chauhan)	2017	—	—	—	—	—	—	—	—	—	—		Jab Harry Met Sejal
"Swerve" (with Starrah)	2017	—	—	—	—	—	—	—	—	—	—		Starrah X Diplo
"Get It Right" (featuring MØ)	2017	—	12	77	71	76	—	—	—	—	—	RMNZ: Platinum	Major Lazer Presents: Give Me Future
"Look Back" (featuring DRAM)	2018	—	—	—	—	—	—	—	—	—	—		California
"Worry No More" (featuring Lil Yachty and Santigold)	2018	—	—	—	—	—	—	—	—	—	—		California
"Color Blind" (featuring Lil Xan)	2018	—	—	—	—	—	—	—	—	—	—	RIAA: Gold; RMNZ: Gold	California
"Suicidal" (featuring Desiigner)	2018	—	—	—	—	—	—	—	—	—	—		California
"Wish" (featuring Trippie Redd)	2018	79	—	—	—	90	—	—	—	— (Note: "Wish" did not enter the NZ Top 40 Singles Chart or Hot Singles Chart, but peaked at number eight on the NZ Heatseeker Singles Chart.)	—	RIAA: Platinum; BPI: Gold; RMNZ: 2× Platinum	California
"Stay Open" (featuring MØ)	2018	—	44	—	—	—	—	—	—	—	—		Non-album single
"Welcome to the Party" (with French Montana and Lil Pump featuring Zhavia Ward)	2018	78	—	87	—	55	—	—	—	— (Note: "Welcome to the Party" did not enter the NZ Top 40 Singles Chart, but peaked at number eight on the NZ Heatseeker Singles Chart.)	—	RIAA: Platinum; BPI: Silver; RMNZ: Gold	Deadpool 2: Original Motion Picture Soundtrack
"Sun in Our Eyes" (with MØ)	2018	—	— (Note: "Sun in Our Eyes" did not enter the US Hot Dance/Electronic Songs chart but peaked at number 25 on the Dance/Mix Show Airplay chart.)	—	67	—	—	—	—	—	—		Forever Neverland
"Close to Me" (with Ellie Goulding and Swae Lee)	2018	24	2	25	16	24	44	8	22	17	17	RIAA: 2× Platinum; ARIA: 2× Platinum; BPI: Platinum; MC: Platinum; RMNZ: 2× Platinum	Brightest Blue
"Boom Bye Bye" (with Niska)	2019	—	—	—	—	—	—	—	—	—	—		Europa
"New Shapes" (featuring Octavian)	2019	—	48	—	—	—	—	—	—	—	—		Europa
"Dip raar" (with Bizzey and Ramiks)	2019	—	—	—	—	—	—	—	33	—	—		Europa
"Hold You Tight"	2019	—	27	—	—	—	—	—	—	— (Note: "Hold You Tight" did not enter the NZ Top 40 Singles Chart, but peaked at number 28 on the NZ Hot Singles Chart.)	—		Higher Ground
"So Long" (featuring Cam)	2019	—	26	—	—	—	—	—	—	— (Note: "So Long" did not enter the NZ Top 40 Singles Chart, but peaked at number 34 on the NZ Hot Singles Chart.)	—		Chapter 1: Snake Oil
"Win Win" (featuring Tove Lo)	2019	—	22	—	—	—	—	—	—	— (Note: "Win Win" did not enter the NZ Top 40 Singles Chart, but peaked at number 27 on the NZ Hot Singles Chart.)	—		Higher Ground
"Give Dem" (with Blond:ish featuring Kah-Lo)	2019	—	—	—	—	—	—	—	—	—	—		Higher Ground
"Spicy" (with Herve Pagez featuring Charli XCX)	2019	—	18	—	—	—	—	—	—	—	—		Non-album singles
"JustYourSoul" (with Valentino Khan)	2019	—	—	—	—	—	—	—	—	—	—		Non-album singles
"Heartless" (solo or with Julia Michaels featuring Morgan Wallen)	2019	39	—	99	—	62	—	—	—	— (Note: "Heartless" did not enter the NZ Top 40 Singles Chart, but peaked at number 25 on the NZ Hot Singles Chart.)	—	RIAA: Diamond; ARIA: 4× Platinum; RMNZ: 2× Platinum	Chapter 1: Snake Oil
"Lonely" (with Jonas Brothers)	2019	— (Note: "Lonely" did not enter the Billboard Hot 100, but peaked at number 10 on the Bubbling Under Hot 100 chart.)	—	40	70	69	—	54	—	— (Note: "Lonely" did not enter the NZ Top 40 Singles Chart, but peaked at number six on the NZ Hot Singles Chart.)	89	RIAA: Gold; ARIA: Platinum; RMNZ: Platinum	Chapter 1: Snake Oil
"Samba Sujo" (with Born Dirty)	2019	—	—	—	—	—	—	—	—	—	—		Do You Dance?
"On My Mind" (with Sidepiece)	2019	—	25	—	64	—	—	26	—	— (Note: "On My Mind" did not enter the NZ Top 40 Singles Chart, but peaked at number 39 on the NZ Hot Singles Chart.)	57	BPI: Gold; RMNZ: Platinum	Diplo and Do You Dance?
"Bubble Up"	2019	—	—	—	—	—	—	—	—	—	—		Higher Ground
"Love to the World" (with Wax Motif)	2020	—	48	—	—	—	—	—	—	— (Note: "Love to the World" did not enter the NZ Top 40 Singles Chart, but peaked at number 39 on the NZ Hot Singles Chart.)	—		Do You Dance?
"Do Si Do" (with Blanco Brown)	2020	—	—	—	—	— (Note: "Do Si Do" did not enter the Canadian Hot 100 but peaked at number 28 on the Canadian Digital Song Sales.)	—	—	—	— (Note: "Do Si Do" did not enter the NZ Top 40 Singles Chart, but peaked at number 21 on the NZ Hot Singles Chart.)	—		Chapter 1: Snake Oil
"Looking for Me" (with Paul Woolford featuring Kareen Lomax)	2020	—	18	32	—	—	—	1	—	—	4	BPI: 2× Platinum; ARIA: Platinum; RMNZ: Gold	Diplo and Do You Dance?
"Daylight" (with Joji)	2020	— (Note: "Daylight" did not enter the Billboard Hot 100, but peaked at number four on the Bubbling Under Hot 100 Singles chart.)	—	100	—	—	—	—	—	—	—	RIAA: Gold; RMNZ: Gold	Nectar
"Turn Back Time" (with Sonny Fodera)	2020	—	17	—	—	—	—	—	—	—	—	BPI: Silver; RMNZ: Gold	Wide Awake and Do You Dance?
"Never Gonna Forget" (with Black Coffee featuring Elderbrook)	2021	—	19	—	—	—	—	—	—	— (Note: "Never Gonna Forget" did not enter the NZ Top 40 Singles Chart, but peaked at number 21 on the NZ Hot Singles Chart.)	—		Non-album single
"One by One" (featuring Elderbrook and Andhim)	2021	—	28	—	—	—	—	—	—	— (Note: "One by One" did not enter the NZ Top 40 Singles Chart, but peaked at number 31 on the NZ Hot Singles Chart.)	—		Diplo
"Don't Be Afraid" (with Damian Lazarus featuring Jungle)	2021	—	18	—	—	—	—	—	—	—	—		Diplo
"Promises" (with Paul Woolford and Kareen Lomax)	2021	—	14	—	—	—	—	—	—	— (Note: "Promises" did not enter the NZ Top 40 Singles Chart, but peaked at number six on the NZ Hot Singles Chart.)	—		Diplo
"Forget About Me" (with Aluna and Durante)	2022	—	17	—	—	—	—	—	—	— (Note: "Forget About Me" did not enter the NZ Top 40 Singles Chart, but peaked at number 11 on the NZ Hot Singles Chart.)	—		Diplo
"Don't Forget My Love" (with Miguel)	2022	—	8	—	—	—	—	33	— (Note: "Don't Forget My Love" did not enter the Dutch Single Top 100, but peaked at number 23 on the Single Tip chart.)	— (Note: "Don't Forget My Love" did not enter the NZ Top 40 Singles Chart, but peaked at number eight on the NZ Hot Singles Chart.)	30	BPI: Platinum; RMNZ: Gold	Diplo
"Pogo" (with bbno$)	2022	—	26	—	—	—	—	—	—	—	—		Non-album single
"Wasted" (featuring Kodak Black and Koe Wetzel)	2023	— (Note: "Wasted" did not enter the US Billboard Hot 100 but peaked at number 20 on the Bubbling Under Hot 100 extension chart.)	—	—	—	—	—	—	—	— (Note: "Wasted" did not enter the NZ Top 40 Singles Chart, but peaked at number 33 on the NZ Hot Singles Chart.)	—		Chapter 2: Swamp Savant
"Use Me (Brutal Hearts)" (with Johnny Blue Skies and Dove Cameron)	2023	—	—	—	—	—	—	—	—	— (Note: "Use Me (Brutal Hearts)" did not enter the NZ Top 40 Singles Chart, but peaked at number 27 on the NZ Hot Singles Chart.)	—		Chapter 2: Swamp Savant
"Sad in the Summer" (with Lily Rose)	2023	—	—	—	—	—	—	—	—	—	—		Chapter 2: Swamp Savant
"Heartbroken" (with Jessie Murph and Polo G)	2023	64	—	—	—	52	—	—	—	— (Note: "Heartbroken" did not enter the NZ Top 40 Singles Chart, but peaked at number 11 on the NZ Hot Singles Chart.)	—	ARIA: Platinum; RMNZ: Gold	Chapter 2: Swamp Savant
"Diamond Therapy" (with Royce and Channel Tres)	2023	—	47	—	—	—	—	—	—	—	—		Non-album singles
"Stay High" (with Hugel featuring Julia Church)	2023	—	36	—	—	—	—	—	—	— (Note: "Stay High" did not enter the NZ Top 40 Singles Chart, but peaked at number 22 on the NZ Hot Singles Chart.)	—		Non-album singles
"42" (with Maren Morris)	2023	—	14	—	—	—	—	—	—	— (Note: "42" did not enter the NZ Top 40 Singles Chart, but peaked at number 32 on the NZ Hot Singles Chart.)	—		Non-album singles
"Anthem" (with Sharam featuring Pony)	2024	—	—	—	—	—	—	—	—	—	—		Non-album singles
"Heaven or Not" (with Riva Starr featuring Kareen Lomax)	2024	—	46	—	—	—	—	—	—	—	—		Non-album singles
"Willing to Let You Go" (with Anella Herim featuring Abby Anderson)	2024	—	—	—	—	—	—	—	—	—	—		Non-album singles
"Midnight Ride" (with Orville Peck and Kylie Minogue)	2024	—	—	—	—	—	—	—	—	— (Note: "Midnight Ride" did not enter the NZ Top 40 Singles Chart, but peaked at number 34 on the NZ Hot Singles Chart.)	— (Note: "Midnight Ride" did not enter the UK Singles Chart, but debuted and peaked at number 7 on the UK Singles Downloads Chart on 14 June 2024.)		Stampede
"Ultraman" (with Oliver Tree)	2024	—	—	—	—	—	—	—	—	— (Note: "Ultraman" did not enter the NZ Top 40 Singles Chart, but peaked at number 38 on the NZ Hot Singles Chart.)	—		Non-album singles
"Receipts" (with Mau P featuring Gunna)	2024	—	24	—	—	—	—	—	—	— (Note: "Receipts" did not enter the NZ Top 40 Singles Chart, but peaked at number 29 on the NZ Hot Singles Chart.)	—		Non-album singles
"Brain" (with D00mscrvll and Artemas)	2025	—	—	—	—	—	—	—	—	— (Note: "Brain" did not enter the NZ Top 40 Singles Chart, but peaked at number 30 on the NZ Hot Singles Chart.)	—		D00mscrvll
"Ashes" (with Bailey Zimmerman)	2025	—	—	—	—	—	—	—	—	— (Note: "Ashes" did not enter the NZ Top 40 Singles Chart, but peaked at number 31 on the NZ Hot Singles Chart.)	—		Non-album single
"Flashlight" (with D00mscrvll featuring Project Pat and Juicy J)	2025	—	—	—	—	—	—	—	—	—	—		D00mscrvll
"Lift Me Up" (featuring Local Singles and Gem Cooke)	2025	—	—	—	—	—	—	—	—	—	—		Non-album single
"Loitering" (with D00mscrvll featuring Kodak Black)	2026	—	16	—	—	—	—	—	—	—	—		D00mscrvll
"Red Eye" (featuring Heidi Klum)	2026	—	—	—	—	—	—	—	—	—	—		Non-album singles
"Would U Still Love Me" (with Cameron Whitcomb)	2026	—	—	—	—	—	—	—	—	— (Note: "Would U Still Love Me" did not enter the NZ Top 40 Singles Chart, but peaked at number 28 on the NZ Hot Singles Chart.)	—		Non-album singles
"—" denotes releases that did not chart or were not released in that territory.

=== As featured artist ===
List of singles as featured artist, with selected chart positions and certifications
Title	Year	Peak chart positions								Certifications	Album
Title	Year	AUS	BEL	DEN	ITA	NLD	NZ	SWI	UK	Certifications	Album
"XXX 88" (MØ featuring Diplo)	2013	—	92	—	—	—	—	—	—		Non-album singles
"P.o.v. 2.0" (The Death Set and The Partysquad featuring Diplo)	2013	—	—	—	—	—	—	—	—		Non-album singles
"Coup d'Etat" (G-Dragon featuring Diplo and Baauer)	2013	—	—	—	—	—	—	—	—		Coup d'Etat
"Elastic Heart" (Sia featuring The Weeknd and Diplo)	2013	67	77	21	11	46	7	12	61	IFPI DEN: Platinum; RMNZ: 4× Platinum	The Hunger Games: Catching Fire
"Eparrei" (Dimitri Vegas & Like Mike featuring Diplo, Fatboy Slim, Bonde do Rolê and Pin)	2014	—	5	—	—	—	—	—	—		Bem Brasil
"Afterhours" (TroyBoi featuring Diplo and Nina Sky)	2016	—	—	—	—	—	—	—	—		Non-album single
"Então Vai" (Pabllo Vittar featuring Diplo)	2018	—	—	—	—	—	—	—	—		Vai Passar Mal
"200 MPH" (Bad Bunny featuring Diplo)	2018	—	—	—	—	—	—	—	—	RIAA: 12× Platinum (Latin)	X 100pre
"Time Is Up" (Poppy featuring Diplo)	2018	—	—	—	—	—	—	—	—		Am I A Girl?
"Chicken Wang" (Wuki featuring Diplo and Snappy Jit)	2020	—	—	—	—	—	—	—	—		Non-album singles
"Zuccenberg" (Tommy Cash featuring $uicideboy$ and Diplo)	2021	—	—	—	—	—	—	—	—		Non-album singles
"—" denotes releases that did not chart or were not released in that territory.

== Other charted songs ==
List of singles as charted songs, with selected chart positions
Title	Year	Peak chart positions				Certifications	Album
Title	Year	US	US Cou. Dig.	US Dance	CAN Dig.	Certifications	Album
"Dance with Me" (featuring Thomas Rhett and Young Thug)	2020	— (Note: "Dance with Me" did not enter the US Billboard Hot 100 but peaked at number eight on the Digital Song Sales extension chart.)	—	—	7	RIAA: Gold; RMNZ: Gold	Diplo Presents Thomas Wesley, Chapter 1: Snake Oil
"Hometown" (featuring Zac Brown and Danielle Bradbery)	2020	— (Note: "Hometown" did not enter the US Billboard Hot 100 but peaked at number 40 on the Digital Song Sales extension chart.)	15	—	—		Diplo Presents Thomas Wesley, Chapter 1: Snake Oil
"Conga Rock" (with Mat.Joe featuring Toto Bona Lokua)	2021	—	—	30	—		Do You Dance?
"MMXX – XII" (featuring Rhye)	2021	—	—	39	—		MMXX
"Let You Go" (with TSHA featuring Kareem Lomax)	2022	—	—	17	—		Diplo
"High Rise" (featuring Amtrac and Leon Bridges)	2022	—	—	31	—		Diplo
"Humble" (with Lil Yachty)	2022	—	—	40	—		Diplo
"—" denotes a recording that did not chart or was not released.

== Other appearances ==
Title	Year	Other artist(s)	Album
"Newsflash"	2004	Sandra Melody	Ninja Tune 2004
"Don't Fall"	2004	—N/a	Zentertainment
"Song for My Father"	2004	—N/a	Diesel:U:Music
"Way More"	2004	—N/a	Big Dada Presents
"Diplo Rhythm"	2005	—N/a	Ninja Tune 2005
"Big Lost"	2005	—N/a	Ninja Tune 2005
"Into the Sun"	2007	Martina Topley-Bird	City Lounge 3
"Where Is Home?"	2007	Bloc Party	Love Music, Hate Racism
"Bandida"	2008	Deize Tigrona	Man Recordings
"Me Chinga"	2008	Deize Tigrona	Man Recordings
"Fuji Oujia"	2008	—N/a	Lagos Shake, A Tony Allen Chop Up
"Wassup Wassup"	2009	Samim	Causes 2
"Summer's Gonna Hurt You"	2010	—N/a	Ninja Tune XX: 20 Years Of Beats & Pieces
"Sunsets"	2011	Borgore	The Filthiest Hits...So Far
"War"	2012	Jack Beats and Example	Careless
"No Problem"	2012	Flinch and Kay	Triple J House Party
"Drop"	2015	DJ Snake and Big Freedia	Entourage
"Me Chinga"	2015	Ben Andrade and Grizzly Bear	California Dreamz
"Open & Close"	2018	Mr Eazi	Life Is Eazi, Vol. 2 - Lagos to London
"Pick Your Battles"	2020	Petit Biscuit	Parachute

== See also ==
- Diplo production discography
