= Diplo (album) =

2022 studio album by Diplo

Studio album by Diplo
- Released: March 4, 2022
- Genres: Dance-pop; electronic; house
- Length: 52:49
- Labels: Higher Ground; Mad Decent
- Producers: Diplo; Alex Metric; Aluna; Amtrac; Andhim; Ape Drums; Aryay; Cesqeaux; Damian Lazarus; Durante; King Henry; Jungle; Maximilian Jaeger; Melé; Nitti Gritti; Paul Woolford; Philip von Boch Scully; Rampa; Santell; Seth Troxler; Sidepiece; TSHA; Vito de Luca

Diplo chronology
Do You Dance? (2021)	Diplo (2022)	Chapter 2: Swamp Savant (2023)

Singles from Diplo
- 1. "On My Mind" Released: December 13, 2019; 2. "Looking for Me" Released: June 24, 2020; 3. "One by One" Released: April 30, 2021; 4. "Don't Be Afraid" Released: June 23, 2021; 5. "Promises" Released: September 28, 2021; 6. "Don't Forget My Love" Released: February 11, 2022

Diplo is the fourth and self-titled studio album by American record producer Diplo. It was released through Higher Ground and Mad Decent on March 4, 2022. The album contains guest appearances from Miguel, Amtrac, Leon Bridges, Ry X, Elderbrook, Andhim, Paul Woolford, Kareen Lomax, Melé, Busta Rhymes, Lil Yachty, Sidepiece, Damian Lazarus, Jungle, TSHA, Aluna, Durante, WhoMadeWho, Seth Troxler, and Desire. While production was mainly handled by Diplo, some other guests on the album also produced the songs that they had collaborated with Diplo on, consisting of Amtrac, Andhim, Paul Woolford, Melé, Sidepiece (Nitti Gritti and Party Favor as a duo), Damian Lazarus, Jungle, TSHA, Aluna, Darunte, and Seth Troxler. Other producers consist of Maximilian Jaeger, King Henry, Rampa, Ape Drums, Cesqeaux, Nitti Gritti as a solo producer as well, Alex Metric, Vito de Luca, Santell, Philip von Boch Scully, and Aryay.

Diplo debuted at number 2 on the US Billboard Top Dance/Electronic Albums chart with 5,500 album-equivalent units.

== Background ==
Diplo felt that the album fits more "like listening to a mixtape, or like listening at a nightclub" and said that he hopes that his fans will start listening to emerging artists who contributed to the album, such as Seth Troxler, Damian Lazarus, Amtrac, Aluna, TSHA, and Jungle, among others. He also stated that he thought that he writes and arranges songs better than he produces them, so he made a lot of pop songs and changed them to dance songs by changing the tempo to "make records that are danceable". Diplo is a dance-pop, electronic, and house album.

== Songs ==
Diplo kicks off with the opening track, "Don't Forget My Love", a collaboration with Miguel, which contains a pop-tinged sound over an electronic drumbeat and "tropical, plucky guitar washes over pulsating drum fills for a sun-on-skin, feel-good feeling" with "strong vocal hooks and piano-driven rhythms that build up without getting over-dramatic". "Promises" and "Looking for Me", both being collaborations with Paul Woolford and Kareen Lomax, sound similar to "Don't Forget My Love". "Let You Go", a collaboration with TSHA that also features Lomax, sounds similar to "Don't Forget My Love", as the progressive house song contains a "sunny piano and synths", meshing the "ravey breakbeats and pianos with a slippery synth hook, resulting in EDM at its most retro-fixated". "Your Eyes", a collaboration with Ry X, is an ambient house song that includes "dreamy, filtered vocals" from Ry X and contains "scattered drum patterns". "Humble", a collaboration with Lil Yachty, is a deep house song that contains "slippery autotuned rap vocals" from the rapper and contains "thumping bass that much better suits Diplo's dancefloor-focused vision". The "Nite Version" of "Forget About Me", a collaboration with Aluna and Durante, is a synthwave song that "showcases the tranquilizing voice of Aluna Francis lulling listeners into spacey beats" and contains "lots of dubby, fluctuating effects". "Make You Happy", a collaboration with WhoMadeWho, is a pop-inspired song that "adds a flair of experimental instrumention" that is borrowed from the band's pop style sounds similar to it. "Right 2 Left", a collaboration with Melé that features Busta Rhymes, is a tribal house banger that contains "frenetic percussion and an addictive hook" from the rapper. "On My Mind", a collaboration with Sidepiece, "penetrates the very soul of the rave-lover, with a final drop that's the cherry on top of the drum-saturated cake".

Leon Bridges "brings a soulful touch" to "High Rise", which also features Amtrac. "Don't Be Afraid", a collaboration with Damian Lazarus, contains falsetto from featured artist band Jungle, along with a funk guitar and "punk-funk bass and Italo-disco synths" to "the glimmering" song, which was compared to Tame Impala's production style in double speed rather than that of Diplo and other dance record producers. "Waiting for You", a collaboration with Seth Troxler that features Desire, is a 2000s-inspired song.

== Release and promotion ==
On February 11, 2022, Diplo announced his self-titled album alongside its complete details. It was described as "the first proper Diplo album since [his 2004 debut studio album,] 'Florida'". Jasper Goggins, the president of Diplo's record label, Mad Decent, referred to the album as "a fantastic and cohesive self-titled work that will stand as a career-defining moment", adding that "the features and collaborations may look like contemporary industry algorithmic engineering, but this album is actually purpose built for Diplo's favourite places to play in the world, a testament to his almost absurd and undying love of DJing live in front of people".

== Singles ==
The lead single of the album, "On My Mind", a collaboration with American record producer and DJ duo Sidepiece, was released on December 13, 2019. The second single, "Looking for Me", a collaboration with British record producer Paul Woolford and American singer Kareen Lomax, was released on June 24, 2020. The third single, "One by One", which features English record producer Elderbrook and German record producer and DJ duo Andhim, was released on April 30, 2021. The fourth single, "Dont Be Afraid", a collaboration with English record producer Damian Lazarus that features British band Jungle, was released on June 23, 2021. The fifth single, "Promises", another collaboration with Woolford and Lomax, was released on September 28, 2021. The sixth single, "Don't Forget My Love", a collaboration with American singer Miguel, was released on February 11, 2022. Although "Forget About Me", a collaboration with English singer-songwriter Aluna and unknown musician Durante, was released as a single on January 14, 2022, it was not directly included on the album, but the "Nite Version" of the song appears on it.

== Critical reception ==
Professional ratings
Aggregate scores
Source	Rating
AnyDecentMusic?	5.9/10
Metacritic	63/100
Review scores
Source	Rating
AllMusic	3.5/5 stars
Clash	7/10
Pitchfork	5.5/10
Vinyl Chapters	3.5/5

Writing for Clash, Gem Stokes felt that "compelling vocal features are clearly a cornerstone of Diplo's work" and "each vocal phrase is measured and deliberate... whether Busta Rhymes, Seth Troxler, Leon Bridges, or Jungle, each featured artist brings a new sense of fluidity and bolsters the stratified drums and smooth production", adding that "with 'Diplo,' listeners can raise their hands to the sky and sink into undulating house, dancing safely under the watchful production of a ten-time Grammy nominee". Megan Buerger of Pitchfork opined that Diplo "should have been a slam dunk—glossy, commercial variations on the Chicago sound are dominating mainstream dance music, and Diplo is one of the few surviving EDM overlords who still has a full calendar of DJ gigs", but conversely stated that it "is surprisingly low on innovation, adventure, and emotion" and "it feels less like a triumphal homecoming and more like another tourist trap", adding that "it's too bad the rest of the LP doesn't concern itself more with the unspoken intimacy of the club experience, or with house music as a vehicle for human connection" and "rather than nourish that friction and vulnerability, these songs feel passionless and removed—full of sparkle but missing anything like a soul".

== Track listing ==
Diplo track listing
No.	Title	Writer(s)	Producer(s)	Length
1.	"Don't Forget My Love" (with Miguel)	Thomas Pentz; Miguel Pimentel; Maximilian Jaeger; Jasper Helderman; Bas van Daalen	Diplo; Jaeger	3:19
2.	"High Rise" (featuring Amtrac and Leon Bridges)	Pentz; Caleb Cornett; Todd Bridges; Henry Allen; Jerome Castille	Diplo; Amtrac; King Henry; Rampa; Jaeger	3:30
3.	"Your Eyes" (with Ry X)	Pentz; Ry Cuming; Jaeger; Eric Alberto-Lopez; Philip von Boch Scully; Jason Evigan	Diplo; Jaeger; Ape Drums	4:14
4.	"One by One" (featuring Elderbrook and Andhim)	Pentz; Alexander Kotz; Simon Haehnel; Tobias Müller; Janée Bennett	Diplo; Andhim; Jaeger	3:00
5.	"Promises" (with Paul Woolford and Kareen Lomax)	Pentz; Paul Woolford; Naji Lomax; Jaeger	Diplo; Woolford	3:21
6.	"Right 2 Left" (with Melé featuring Busta Rhymes)	Pentz; Christopher Peers; Trevor Smith, Jr.; Lawrence Dermer; Henry Stone; Freddy Stonewall	Diplo; Melé; Jaeger	2:34
7.	"Humble" (with Lil Yachty)	Pentz; Miles McCollum; Daniel Tuparia; Richard Mears IV; Rio Leyva; Helderman; van Daalen	Diplo; Cesqeaux; Nitti Gritti	3:27
8.	"On My Mind" (with Sidepiece)	Pentz; Mears; Dylan Ragland; Gordon Sumner; Melissa Elliott; Chad Elliott; George Pearson	Diplo; Sidepiece	3:09
9.	"Don't Be Afraid" (with Damian Lazarus featuring Jungle)	Pentz; Damian Lazarus; Joshua Lloyd-Watson	Diplo; Lazarus; Jungle; Alex Metric; Vito de Luca; Jaeger	3:23
10.	"Let You Go" (with TSHA featuring Kareen Lomax)	Pentz; Teisha Matthews; Lomax; Tobias Jesso Jr.; Matthew Phelan	Diplo; TSHA; Jaeger; Santell; Nitti Gritti	3:54
11.	"Forget About Me (Nite Version)" (Nite Version) (with Aluna and Durante)	Pentz; Aluna Francis; Kevin Durante; Kelli-Leigh Henry Davila; David M. Karbal	Diplo; Aluna; Durante	5:36
12.	"Make You Happy" (with WhoMadeWho)	Pentz; Tomas Høffding; Jeppe Kjellberg; Tomas Barfod; Clara Fabricius; Gregor Sütterlin; von Boch Scully; Karbal	Diplo; von Boch Scully; Jaeger; Rampa; Aryay	4:13
13.	"Waiting for You" (with Seth Troxler featuring Desire)	Pentz; Seth Troxler; John Padgett	Diplo; Troxler; Jaeger	5:36
14.	"Looking for Me" (with Paul Woolford and Kareen Lomax)	Pentz; Woolford; Lomax; Philip Meckseper	Diplo; Woolford	3:31
Total length:				52:49

== Charts ==
Chart performance for Diplo
Chart (2022)	Peak position
Australian Albums (ARIA)	100
US Top Dance Albums (Billboard)	2
