= Sidepiece (duo) =

American DJ and production duo

Sidepiece (stylized in all caps) is an American DJ and production duo formed in 2019 by Dylan Ragland (known as Party Favor) and Ricky Mears (known as Nitti Gritti). The pair have established themselves in the electronic dance music (EDM) scene, particularly within the house and tech house genres.

== History ==
Dylan Ragland and Ricky Mears, both accomplished producers in their own right, came together to form Sidepiece as a side project to explore their shared passion for house music. Their collaboration began in 2019, and they released their debut single, "Wanna See You" that same year.

Their breakout came with the 2019 single "On My Mind", a collaboration with Diplo. The track garnered significant attention, amassing over 222 million streams on Spotify and earning a nomination for Best Dance Recording at the 63rd Annual Grammy Awards in 2021.

== Discography ==
=== Charted singles ===
Title	Year	Peak chart positions				
Title	Year	US Dance	AUS	CAN	IRE	UK
"On My Mind" (with Diplo)	2019	25	—	—	26	57
"Can I Ride" (with 95 South)	2026	6	73	90	54	90
