= Looking for Me =

2020 single by Paul Woolford and Diplo featuring Kareen Lomax

Single by Paul Woolford and Diplo featuring Kareen Lomax

from the album Diplo and the EP Do You Dance?
- Released: 24 June 2020
- Length: 3:31
- Label: Higher Ground
- Songwriter(s): Naji Kareen Lomax; Paul Woolford; Philip Meckseper; Thomas Wesley Pentz
- Producer(s): Diplo; Paul Woolford

Paul Woolford singles chronology
"You Already Know" (2019)	"Looking for Me" (2020)	"Tear It Up" (2020)

Diplo singles chronology
"Do Si Do" (2020)	"Looking for Me" (2020)	"Daylight" (2020)

Kareen Lomax singles chronology
"Muse" (2018)	"Looking for Me" (2020)	"Hard Feelings" (2020)

Music video
- "Looking for Me" on YouTube

"Looking for Me" is a song by British producer Paul Woolford and American producer Diplo, featuring vocals from American singer Kareen Lomax. It was released as a single on 24 June 2020, and has peaked at number 4 on the UK Singles Chart.

== Background ==
Before the song came about, Lomax messaged Diplo on Instagram, with hopes to be featured on one of his productions. Paul Woolford also revealed that he was working on a collaboration with Diplo in January 2020.

The song was released through Diplo's record label, Higher Ground and features vocals by American singer Kareen Lomax.

== Chart performance ==
"Looking for Me" first entered the UK Singles Chart top 100 in July 2020, making its debut at number 74 and reaching the top 40 in its fourth week on the chart. It took a further five weeks to make it to the top 10, during which time it also topped the UK Trending Chart. It reached its peak of four on the week dated 1 October, spending two weeks there.

== Charts ==
=== Weekly charts ===
Chart performance for "Looking for Me"
Chart (2020–2021)	Peak position
Australia (ARIA)	32
Belgium (Ultratip Bubbling Under Wallonia)	27
Ireland (IRMA)	1
Romania (Airplay 100)	99
Scotland (OCC)	5
UK Singles (OCC)	4
US Hot Dance/Electronic Songs (Billboard)	18

=== Year-end charts ===
Year-end chart performance for "Looking for Me"
Chart (2020)	Position
UK Singles (OCC)	55
US Hot Dance/Electronic Songs (Billboard)	59

== Certifications ==
Region	Certification	Certified units/sales
Australia (ARIA)	Platinum	70,000^{‡}
New Zealand (RMNZ)	Gold	15,000^{‡}
United Kingdom (BPI)	2× Platinum	1,200,000^{‡}
^{‡} Sales+streaming figures based on certification alone.
