= D00mscrvll =

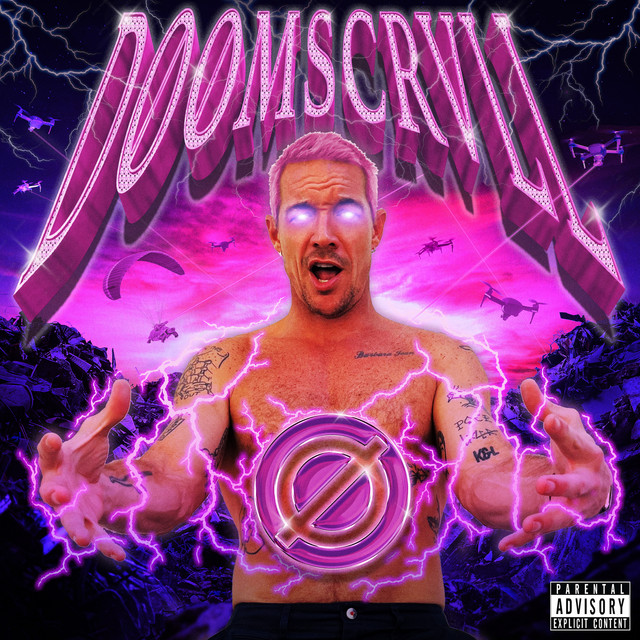

Studio album by D00mscrvll
- Released: January 9, 2026
- Genres: Phonk; trap; electronic; Memphis rap
- Length: 32:52
- Labels: d00mscrvll; Black 17 Media
- Producer: Diplo

Diplo chronology
D00mscrvll, Vol. 1 (2025)	D00mscrvll (2026)

D00mscrvll (stylized in all lowercase) is the sixth studio album by American DJ and record producer Diplo, released under his phonk alias D00mscrvll. It was released on January 9, 2026, through the d00mscrvll imprint and Black 17 Media. The album is Diplo’s full-length entry into the phonk genre and expands upon the 2025 mixtape d00mscrvll, Vol. 1 by combining those tracks with a second volume of new material.

The project features extensive collaborations with Memphis rap figures Juicy J and Project Pat of Three 6 Mafia, as well as phonk and electronic artists including Odetari, Kordhell, 1nonly, DVRST, Kodak Black, Yo Gotti, Artemas, Benny Benassi, Starrah, and others.

== Background ==
Diplo has described phonk as a major influence rooted in his long-standing appreciation for Memphis rap. After releasing the nine-track mixtape d00mscrvll, Vol. 1 on October 31, 2025, he returned in early 2026 with a full-length album that incorporated the earlier material alongside nine new songs.

The title and aesthetic of the project draw from internet culture and the “endless scroll,” reflecting the online origins of the phonk genre. Diplo positioned the album as a genre-blending experiment that mixes classic Memphis hip-hop elements with contemporary phonk, hyperpop, and electronic production.

A vinyl edition of the album was later scheduled for release on July 24, 2026.

== Critical reception ==
Upon release, d00mscrvll received mixed responses from listeners. Some praised its energetic production and high-profile collaborations, while others criticized it as a commercialized take on the phonk aesthetic. User scores on aggregate sites reflected a polarized reception.

== Track listing ==
Disc one
No.	Title	Writer(s)	Producer(s)	Length
1.	"Wit Dat Steel" (featuring 1nonly)	Thomas Wesley Pentz; Nathan Fuller; MacKenzie Johnson; Brian Andrew Domalik	Diplo; MAKJ; Adieu	1:33
2.	"Flow State" (featuring Odetari)	Pentz; Taha Othman Ahmad; MacKenzie Johnson; Brian Andrew Domalik	Diplo; Odetari; MAKJ; Adieu	1:15
3.	"Skittles" (featuring Juicy J and Project Pat)		Diplo; Juicy J; MAKJ; Daniel Etienne	1:56
4.	"Loitering" (featuring Kodak Black)		Diplo; MAKJ; Daniel Etienne	2:40
5.	"I Luv U"		Diplo	1:54
6.	"Uh Ah Ah" (featuring Mc Gw and Duis Nulla)		Diplo	1:45
7.	"Stay Woke" (featuring Juicy J and Project Pat)		Diplo; Juicy J	1:32
8.	"Demons" (featuring DVRST)		Diplo	2:13

Disc two
No.	Title	Producer(s)	Length
1.	"Flashlight" (featuring Project Pat and Juicy J)	Diplo; Juicy J; MAKJ; Daniel Etienne	1:49
2.	"Brain" (featuring Artemas)	Diplo; von Boch; Perto	2:39
3.	"My Money" (featuring Yo Gotti)	Diplo	1:55
4.	"Trippy Mane" (featuring Project Pat)	Diplo; Daniel Etienne; Juicy J; MAKJ; Boaz van de Beatz	1:33
5.	"Hot P Suit" (featuring MC Lan)	Diplo	2:00
6.	"Gang Activity" (featuring Kordhell and Project Pat)	Diplo	1:32
7.	"Toma Toma" (with Benny Benassi featuring Nfasis)	Diplo; Benny Benassi	1:55
8.	"Still Get Like That" (featuring Project Pat and Starrah)	Diplo	1:41
9.	"Psychward" (with WesGhost featuring Project Pat)	Diplo	2:53
Total length:			32:52
