= Nitti (DJ) =

American record producer (born 1994)

- Also known as: Nitti Gritti
- Born: Richard Cook Mears IV; May 10, 1994 (age 32)
- Genres: EDM; hip hop; electro house; big room house; trap
- Occupations: DJ, producer, musician
- Years active: 2016–present
- Labels: Kannibalen; RCA; Musical Freedom; Insomniac; Mad Decent; Spinnin'
- Member of: Sidepiece

Richard Cook Mears IV (born May 10, 1994), better known as Nitti and formerly known as Nitti Gritti is a Miami based record producer, DJ and vocalist. His collaboration with Party Favor as Sidepiece, a music duo group, was nominated for a Grammy in 2021 under Best Dance Recording segment for their 2019 single "On My Mind" featuring Diplo. He is known for collaborating and working with Enrique Iglesias, Pitbull, DJ Snake, Shaquille O'Neal, Tiesto, Diplo, Ookay, Jimmy Levy, Shndō, etc. In 2019, His single "200 MPH" with Diplo won a Latin Grammy, which was on Bad Bunny's album X 100PRE.

== Biography ==
Raised in Pennsylvania, Mears moved with his family to Haiti at the age of six where his parents served in Christian missionary work—his father as a soccer coach and his mother, a teacher. After living In Haiti for eight years, he moved to Miami, Florida. He started his professional music career under the name Nitti Gritti in the year 2016 as he released "It's Nit!". In 2018, he attended his first world tour and Ghastly's The Mystifying Oracle Tour. In the same year he produced Enrique's "Move To Miami" featuring Pitbull and Bad Bunny's "200 MPH", with Diplo. His 2018 release Crack was the 7th most played song at 2018 Ultra Music Festival. Mears performed in Audiotistic Music Festival, Electric Daisy Carnival, Life in Color, Okeechobee Music & Arts Festival, Asteria Music Festival etc. His single "200 MPH", received a Latin Grammy in 2019.

On September 19, 2019, Nitti Gritti announced collaboration with Party Favor to form the duo Sidepiece. Their debut release was "Wanna See You" published through Billboard. Their 2020 single "On My Mind" was nominated in the 63rd Annual Grammy Awards for Best Dance Recording segment. In 2020, he was ranked the 14th in the list of the Top 101 Producers in the world by 1001tracklists.com.

== Discography ==
=== Extended plays ===
- C'est La Vie (2017)
- Fear (2017)
- Judge Me (2018)
- Drive (2018)
- 4 on the Floor (2019)
- What a Time to Be Alive (2020)
- Ro Sham Bo (2020)
- All In (2020)
- The Loud / Losing Count (2021)

=== Singles ===
- It's Nit! (2016)
- Get Down (2016)
- Put a Little Grit in It (2016)
- Dirty dancing (2017)
- Let Me Go (2017)
- Badlands w/ Kompany (2017)
- Buti w/ Nonsens (2017)
- Waxin' (2017)
- Gin & Juice w/ Adair (2017)
- Snappin' & Trappin' w/ Part Native (2017)
- Milky w/ Holly (2017)
- Limbo w/ Adair (2017)
- Famous w/ Jupe (2017)
- Sick (2017)
- Too Much (2017)
- Eskeddit w/ Chavalo (2017)
- Crack (2018)
- Bailando w/ Vlien Boy (2018)
- In This (2018)
- Hush Money (2018)
- Forbidden Kingdom Anthem (2018)
- Apocalypse w/ Yookie (2019)
- Ballin w/ Hoodlit featuring Guapdad4000 (2019)
- Underdogs w/ Gammer (2019)
- Holy Chit w/ Tynan (2019)
- Eyes on You (2019)
- Crack VIP (2019)
- Pass Out w/ Gaeko and Kaku (2020)
- Rock N Roll w/ Maliboux (2020)
- Rawhide w/ Lil Texas (2020)
- Selfish w/ Sogumm, Kaku and Jason Lee (2020)
- Cold Day In Hell w/ Dr.Fresch (2020)
- Where I Belong w/ Runn (2021) – US Dance/Mix Show Airplay #24
- Matrix (2021) – US Dance/Electronic Digital Song Sales #12
- Hey Motherfucker w/ Timmy Trumpet (2021)
- Bad Bitches w/ Marshmello and Megan Thee Stallion (2021) – US Hot Dance/Electronic Songs #23
- Stay / What You Wanted (2021)
- Your Body w/ Valentino Khan (2021)
- Moshpit / Comin For Ya Neck (2021)
- Daddy / What Happens In Vegas (2021)
- Drive You Crazy w/ Dylan Matthew (2022)
