= Paul Woolford (DJ) =

British DJ and record producer

- Also known as: Special Request, Bobby Peru
- Born: 28 June 1976 (age 49)
- Origin: Leeds, England
- Genres: Electronic
- Years active: 2002–present
- Labels: Dirtybird Records

Paul Woolford (born 28 June 1976) is a British dance music producer and DJ from Leeds, Yorkshire, who also uses the aliases Bobby Peru and Special Request, such as on the underground hit, "Erotic Discourse".

== Biography ==
An adoptee, Woolford grew up in Leeds with his brother Mark. Paul was inspired by the club night Back to Basics, eventually becoming a resident there. Starting in 2008, he was a weekly resident of We Love Space, which was a long-running Sunday party at Space in Ibiza. He constantly tours to play guest spots in addition to his residency and owns the record label, Intimacy.

Woolford scored a hit single in 2020 with "Looking for Me", a collaboration with American DJ and producer Diplo, featuring vocals from American singer Kareen Lomax. The single peaked at number four in the UK Singles Chart and reached number-one in Ireland.

== Discography ==
=== Singles ===
List of singles released with year, artist(s) involved, selected chart positions, certifications and album name.
Title	Year	Peak chart positions					Certifications	Album
Title	Year	UK	AUS	BEL (FL) Tip	IRE	SCO	Certifications	Album
"Hang Up Your Hang Ups (The Only One)" (featuring Kim English)	2018	—	—	77	—	—		Non-album singles
"You Already Know" (with Karen Harding)	2019	—	—	—	—	—		Non-album singles
"Looking for Me" (with Diplo featuring Kareen Lomax)	2020	4	32	—	1	5	BPI: 2× Platinum; ARIA: Platinum	Diplo and Do You Dance?
"Tear It Up" (with Solardo featuring Pamela Fernandez)	2020	—	—	—	—	—		Non-album singles
"All I Want" (with Secondcity featuring Andrea Martin)	2020	—	—	—	—	—		Non-album singles
"Heat" (with Amber Mark)	2021	61	—	—	99	—	BPI: Silver	Non-album singles
"Promises" (with Diplo featuring Kareen Lomax)	2021	―	―	―	―	―		Diplo
"Teardrops" (with MK featuring Majid Jordan)	2022	―	―	―	―	―		Non-album singles
"Fever" (with Alison Goldfrapp)	2023	―	―	―	―	―		The Love Invention
"16 Again" (with Lewis Thompson and MNEK)	2023	―	―	―	―	―		Non-album singles
"Like I Used To" (with Sonny Fodera and Ella Henderson)	2023	―	―	―	―	―		Non-album singles
"Heatstroke" (with Aluna)	2024	―	―	―	―	―		Non-album singles
"—" denotes a recording that did not chart or was not released.
