= Diplo production discography =

The following is a discography of production by Diplo, an American DJ and record producer. It includes a list of songs produced, co-produced and remixed by year, artist, album and title.

== Singles produced ==
List of singles as either producer or co-producer, with selected chart positions and certifications, showing year released, performing artists and album name
Title	Year	Peak chart positions										Certifications	Album
Title	Year	US	AUS	CAN	DEN	GER	IRL	NL	NZ	SWI	UK	Certifications	Album
"Bucky Done Gun" (M.I.A.)	2005	—	—	—	—	—	—	—	—	—	88		Arular
"Paper Planes" (M.I.A.)	2008	4	66	7	18	76	23	57	—	—	19	CAN: 3× Platinum; RIANZ: Gold; UK: Gold; US: 3× Platinum	Kala
"That Tree" (Snoop Dogg featuring Kid Cudi)	2010	—	—	—	—	—	—	—	—	—	—		More Malice
"Look at Me Now" (Chris Brown featuring Lil Wayne & Busta Rhymes)	2011	6	46	51	—	—	—	—	37	—	44	AUS: Gold	F.A.M.E.
"Too Close" (Alex Clare)	2011	7	66	14	29	1	47	33	—	12	4	AUS: Gold; GER: Platinum; SWI: Gold; UK: Platinum; US: 2× Platinum	The Lateness of the Hour
"Beat of My Drum" (Nicola Roberts)	2011	—	—	—	—	—	37	—	—	—	27		Cinderella's Eyes
"Climax" (Usher)	2012	17	29	96	39	—	39	82	—	—	4	AUS: Gold	Looking 4 Myself
"End of Time" (Beyoncé)	2012	113	—	—	—	—	27	—	—	—	39		4
"Mad Legit"	2013	—	—	—	—	—	—	—	—	—	—		
"Earthquake" (VS DJ Fresh featuring Dominique Young Unique)	2013	—	—	—	—	—	60	—	—	—	4		OST. Kick Ass 2
"Trampoline" (Tinie Tempah featuring 2 Chainz)	2013	—	—	—	—	—	—	27	—	—	3		Demonstration
"Elastic Heart" (Sia featuring The Weeknd and Diplo)	2013	17	5	7	21	29	4	46	7	12	10	Australia: 3× Platinum; Belgium: Gold; Canada: Platinum; Denmark: Platinum; Italy - 2× Platinum; New Zealand: Platinum; UK: Platinum; US: 2× Platinum	The Hunger Games: Catching Fire – Original Motion Picture Soundtrack
"Stand For" (Ty Dolla Sign)	2014	—	—	—	—	—	—	—	—	—	—		Free TC
"Living for Love" (Madonna)	2015	108	—	92	—	40	79	—	—	49	26	Italy: Gold	Rebel Heart
"Bitch I'm Madonna" (Madonna featuring Nicki Minaj)	2015	84	—	58	—	—	—	—	—	—	—	Poland: Gold	Rebel Heart
"Be Right There" (Diplo with Sleepy Tom)	2015	—	34	—	—	69	31	83	—	19	8	New Zealand: Platinum; UK: Gold	Non-album single
"Hold Up" (Beyoncé)	2016	13	25	37	3	—	—	52	—	—	11	AUS: Gold; UK: Silver; US: Gold	Lemonade
"All Night" (Beyoncé)	2016	38	—	73	—	—	—	—	—	—	60	AUS: Gold; UK: Silver; US: Gold	Lemonade
"Live It Up" (Nicky Jam featuring Will Smith and Era Istrefi)	2018	—	17	—	—	21	—	78	—	32	—	IFPI SWI: Gold	Non-album single
"Zuccenberg" (Tommy Cash & $uicideboy$)	2021	—	—	—	—	—	—	—	—	—	—		Moneysutra
"Funk Rave" (Anitta)	2023	—	—	—	—	—	—	—	—	—	—		Funk Generation
"Like Jennie" (Jennie)	2025	83	35	42	—	71	66	—	31	61	36	Canada: Gold; Hungary: Gold; Portugal: Gold	Ruby
"Jump" (Blackpink)	2025	28	42	19	—	8	18	22	13	6	18		Deadline (EP)
"—" denotes a recording that did not chart or was not released in that territory.

== 2002 ==
=== Diplo – Sound and Fury ===
- 01. "Form"
- 02. "One-Four"
- 03. "Making it Hard"
- 04. "Krunk (Variation #2)"
- 05. "When Eggnog Goes Bad"
- 06. "Total Blank"
- 07. "Support Your Local Travel Agent"
- 08. "Slow Fall"
- 09. "Krunkepistomology"
- 10. "Lost Under My Sheets"
- 11. "Dana"
- 12. "Pinniped-Quadruped"
- 13. "Clear Day (Reprise) Dinosaurs Can See Everything"
- 14. "Uppity"
- 15. "Light in August"
- 16. "Bonus Beats"

== 2004 ==
=== Diplo – Florida ===
- 01. "Florida"
- 02. "Big Lost"
- 03. "Sarah"
- 04. "Into the Sun" (featuring. Martina Topley-Bird)
- 05. "Way More"
  - Sample Credit: "Aria" by Marc Moulin
- 06. "Money, Power, Respect"
- 07. "Diplo Rhythm" (featuring. Sandra Melody, Vybz Cartel & Pantera Os Danadinhos)
- 08. "Works"
- 09. "Indian Thick Jawns" (featuring. P.E.A.C.E.)
- 10. "Summer's Gonna Hurt You"
  - Sample Credit: "Múm" by The Balled of the Broken Birdie Records
- 11. "It's all Part of a Bigger Plan"

=== Viktor Vaughn - VV:2 ===
- 02. "Back End" (Produced with System D-128)

== 2005 ==
=== Kano – Home Sweet Home ===
- 04. Reload It"

=== M.I.A. – Arular ===
- 03. "Bucky Done Gun" (Produced with Switch)
  - Sample Credit: "Gonna Fly Now" by Bill Conti
  - Sample Credit: "Injeção" by Deise Tigrona

== 2007 ==
=== M.I.A. – Kala ===
- 05. "Hussel" (featuring. Afrikan Boy) (Produced with M.I.A.)
- 10. "XR2" (Produced with Switch)
- 11. "Paper Planes" (Produced with Switch)

== 2008 ==
=== Santigold – Santogold ===
- 06. "My Superman" (Produced with John Hill)
- 08. "Starstruck" (Produced with Switch & John Hill)
- 09. "Unstoppable" (Produced with John Hill)

== 2009 ==
=== Drake – So Far Gone ===
- 11. "Unstoppable" (featuring. Lil Wayne & Santigold) (Produced with John Hill)
  - Sample Credit: "Unstoppable" by Santigold

=== Amanda Blank – I Love You ===
- 02. "Something Bigger, Something Better"
- 05. "Lemme Get Some" (featuring. Chuck Inglish)
- 07. "A Love Song" (featuring. Santigold)
- 08. "DJ" (Additional production by Switch)

=== Die Antwoord – $O$ ===
- 05. "Evil Boy" (featuring. Wanga)
  - Appearance in video

== 2010 ==
=== Snoop Dogg – More Malice ===
- 05. "That Tree" (featuring. Kid Cudi) (Additional production by Paul Devro)

=== Rolo Tomassi – Cosmology ===
- 01. "Katzenklavier"
- 02. "Agamemnon"
- 03. "House House Casanova"
- 04. "Party Wounds"
- 05. "Unromance"
- 06. "French Motel"
- 07. "Kasia"
- 08. "Sakia"
- 09. "Tongue In Chic"
- 10. "Cosmology"

=== Robyn – Body Talk Pt. 1 ===
- 05. "Dancehall Queen" (Produced with Klas Åhlund)

=== M.I.A. – Maya ===
- 07. "It Takes a Muscle"
- 11. "Tell Me Why"
  - Sample Credit: "The Last Words of Copernicus" by Alabama Sacred Harp Singers

=== Robyn – Body Talk Pt. 2 ===
- 06. "Criminal Intent" (Produced with Klas Åhlund)

=== Das Racist – Sit Down, Man ===
- 17. "You Can Sell Anything"

=== Robyn – Body Talk ===
- 12. "Dancehall Queen" (Produced with Klas Åhlund)

=== G-Dragon & T.O.P. – GD & TOP ===
- 06. "뻑이가요 (Knock Out)"

== 2011 ==
=== Chris Brown – F.A.M.E. ===
- 04. "Look at Me Now" (featuring. Lil Wayne & Busta Rhymes) (Produced with Afrojack & Free School)

=== Beyoncé – 4 ===
- 10. "End of Time" (Produced with Beyoncé, The-Dream & Switch)

=== Alex Clare – The Lateness of the Hour ===
- 04. "Too Close" (Produced with Switch & Mike Spencer)

=== Kelly Rowland – Here I Am ===
- 15. "Motivation (Diplo Remix)" (Produced with Jim Jonsin & Rico Love) (International edition)

=== Nicola Roberts – Cinderella's Eyes ===
- 01. "Beat of My Drum" (Produced with Dimitri Tikovoi & Derek Allen)

=== Lil Wayne – Tha Carter IV ===
- 18. "Two Shots" (Additional Production by DJA) (Deluxe edition bonus track)

=== Das Racist – Relax ===
- 07. "Happy Rappy"

=== Wale – Ambition ===
- 10. "Slight Work" (featuring. Big Sean)

=== Yelawolf – Radioactive ===
- 09. "Animal" (featuring. Fefe Dobson) (Produced with Borgore)

=== The Death Set – Michel Poiccard ===
- 15. "Yo David Chase! You P.O.V. Shot Me In The Head"

== 2012 ==
=== Santigold – Master of My Make-Believe ===
- 08. "Pirate In the Water" (Produced with Santigold & Switch)
- 10. "Look at these Hoes" (Produced with Santigold & Boyz Noize)

=== Marina and the Diamonds – Electra Heart ===
- 03. "Lies" (Produced with Dr. Luke & Cirkut)

=== Travis Porter – From Day 1 ===
- 04. "Wobble" (Produced with DJA)

=== Usher – Looking 4 Myself ===
- 03. "Climax"
- 17. "2nd Round" (Deluxe edition bonus track)

=== Justin Bieber – Believe ===
- 09. "Thought of You" (Produced with Ariel Rechtshaid)

=== Azealia Banks – Fantasea ===
- 05. "Fuck Up The Fun" (Produced with DJ Master D)

=== Rita Ora – Ora ===
- 11. "Hello, Hi, Goodbye" (Produced with The-Dream)
- 13. "Crazy Girl" (Deluxe edition bonus track)

=== Kreayshawn – Somethin' 'Bout Kreay ===
- 09. "Twerkin!!!" (featuring. Diplo & Sissy Nobby) (Produced with Tai, Free School, Jonas Jeberg)

=== Iggy Azalea – TrapGold ===
(Executive producer)

- 02. "Yo El' Ray" (Produced with Bro Safari & FKi)
- 03. "Down South" (Produced with FKi)
- 04. "Demons" (Produced with Sleigh Bells)
- 05. "Slo." (Produced with FKi)
- 08. "1 800 BONE" (Produced with FKi)

=== Bruno Mars – Unorthodox Jukebox ===
- 09. "Money Make Her Smile" (Produced with The Smeezingtons)

=== Katy B – Danger EP ===
- 03. "Light As A Feather" (featuring Iggy Azalea)

=== Wale – Folarin ===
- 15. "The One Eyed Kitten Song" (featuring. Travis Porter)

=== Marsha Ambrosius – Late Nights & Early Mornings ===
- 00. "Cold War" (Produced with The Picard Bros)

=== Banda Uó – Motel ===
- 05. "Gringo" (Produced with Davi Sabbag)

== 2013 ==
=== Usher – Go Missin' ===
- 01. "Go Missin'"

=== Tamar Braxton – Love and War ===
- 06. "One on One Fun"

=== PSY – Gangnam Style Remix Style ===
- 01. "Gangnam Style (Diplo Remix)" (featuring 2 Chainz and Tyga)
- 03. "Gangnam Style (Diplo Remix) (Instrumental)"

=== Lil Wayne – I Am Not a Human Being II ===
- 15. "Lay It Down" (featuring Nicki Minaj & Cory Gunz) (produced with Hudson Mohawke & Lunice) (Deluxe edition bonus track)

=== Sevyn Streeter – It Won't Stop ===
- 00. "It Won't Stop" (Produced with The Picard Bros)

=== Mac Miller – Watching Movies with the Sound Off ===
- 17. "Goosebumps"

=== Tinie Tempah – Demonstration ===
- 2. "Trampoline" (featuring 2 Chainz)
- 9. "Shape" (featuring Big Sean)

=== G-Dragon – Coup d'Etat ===
- 1. "쿠데타 (Coup d'Etat)" (produced with Baauer)

=== MØ – Bikini Daze ===
- 1. "XXX 88" (produced with Ronni Vindahl)

=== Britney Spears – Britney Jean ===
- 8. "Passenger"

=== Justin Bieber – Journals ===
- 15. "Memphis" (featuring. Big Sean)(Produced with Siriusmo & Djemba Djemba)

=== Snoop Lion – Reincarnated ===
- 1. "Rebel Way"
- 2. "Here Comes the King" (featuring. Angela Hunte)
- 3. "Lighters Up" (featuring. Mavado and Popcaan)
- 4. "So Long" (featuring. Angela Hunte)
- 5. "Get Away" (featuring. Angela Hunte)
- 6. "No Guns Allowed" (featuring. Drake and Cori B)
- 7. "Fruit Juice" (featuring. Mr. Vegas)
- 8. "Smoke the Weed" (featuring. Collie Buddz)
- 11. "Torn Apart" (featuring. Rita Ora)
- 12. "Ashtrays and Heartbreaks" (featuring. Miley Cyrus)
- 13. "Boulevard" (featuring. Jahdan Blakkamoore)
- 14. "Remedy" (featuring. Busta Rhymes and Chris Brown)
- 15. "La La La"
- 16. "Harder Times" (featuring. Jahdan Blakkamoore)

== 2014 ==
=== Brooke Candy - Opulence ===
- 01. "Opulence"

=== Jessie J – Sweet Talker ===
- 03. "Sweet Talker"

=== Chris Brown – X ===
- 01. "X"

== 2015 ==
=== Madonna – Rebel Heart ===
- 01. "Living for Love" (produced with Madonna and Ariel Rechtshaid)
- 04. "Unapologetic Bitch" (produced with Madonna, Ariel Rechtschaid, Shelco Garcia and Teenwolf)
- 06. "Bitch I'm Madonna" (featuring Nicki Minaj) (produced with Madonna and SOPHIE)
- 15. "Best Night" (produced with Madonna)
- 16. "Veni Vidi Vici" (featuring Nas) (produced with Madonna)

=== Ivy Levan – No Good ===
- 06. "27 Club"

=== MØ – "Kamikaze – Single" ===
- 01. "Kamikaze"

== 2016 ==
=== Beyoncé – Lemonade ===
- 02. "Hold Up"
- 11. "All Night"

=== M.I.A. – AIM ===
- 13. "Bird Song" (Diplo version)

=== Craig David - Following My Intuition ===
- 04. "16"

=== Black M – Éternel insatisfait ===
- 06. "Fais-moi rêver"

=== The Weeknd – Starboy ===
- 15. "Nothing Without You"

== 2017 ==
=== Pabllo Vittar - Vai Passar Mal ===
- 07. Então Vai

=== XXXTENTACION - Revenge ===
- 03. Looking for a Star

=== Lil Yachty - Teenage Emotions ===
- 10. Forever Young

=== Maroon 5 – Red Pill Blues ===
- 06. "Help Me Out" (with Julia Michaels)

== 2018 ==
=== Trippie Redd - Life's a Trip ===
- 03. Wish by Diplo (feat. Trippie Redd)

== 2019 ==
=== Madonna - Madame X ===
- 04. Future (feat. Quavo)

=== Trippie Redd - ! (Exclamation Mark) ===
- 01. “!” (feat. Diplo)

== 2026 ==
=== BTS - Arirang ===
- 01. "Body to Body"
- 04. "Fya"
- 10. "Like Animals"
- 12. "One More Night"
- 14. "Into the Sun"

== Songs remixed ==
- 2004: Michael Giacchino – "The Glory Days (Diplo Remix)"
- 2005: Disco D – "Lets Hug It Out Bitch (Diplo Remix)"
- 2005: Edu K – "Popozuda Rock n' Roll (Diplo Remix)"
- 2005: Gwen Stefani – "Hollaback Girl (Hollatronix Remix)" (Sample credit: "Feira de Acari" by Baile Funk)
- 2005: Kanye West – "Gold Digger (Diplo Mix)"
- 2005: Spank Rock – "Put That Pussy On Me (Diplo Tonite Remix)"
- 2005: Three 6 Mafia – "Stay Fly (Mad Decent Remix)"
- 2005: Biz Markie – "Vapors (Diplo Remix)"
- 2005: Walter Wanderley – "Popcorn (Diplo Remix)"
- 2006: Beck – "Wish Coin (Go it Alone)"
- 2006: Bloc Party – "Helicopter (Diplo Remix)"
- 2006: Clipse – "Queen Bitch (Diplo Remix)"
- 2006: CSS – "Let's Make Love and Listen to Death From Above (Diplo Remix)"
- 2006: Daedelus – "Sundown (Diplo Remix)"
- 2006: Hot Chip – "Over And Over (Shake It Over And Over)"
- 2006: Justin Timberlake – "My Love (Diplo Remix)"
- 2006: The Beatles – "Twist and Shout (Diplo B'more Edit)"
- 2006: Yeah Yeah Yeahs – "Gold Lion (Diplo Remix)"
- 2007: M.I.A. – "Birdflu (Diplo Remix)"
- 2007: Claude VonStroke – "The Whistler (Diplo Remix)"
- 2007: Daft Punk – "Harder, Better, Faster, Stronger (Diplo's Work Is Never Over)"
- 2007: Peter Bjorn and John – "Young Folks (Diplo's Drums of Death Remix)"
- 2007: Znobia – "Tchilo (Diplo Mix)"
- 2007: Bart Simpson – "Do the Bartman (Bartman So So Krispy Remix)"
- 2007: The Decemberists – "The Perfect Crime No. 2 (Doing Time Remix)"
- 2007: Bloc Party – "Where Is Home? (Diplo Mix)"
- 2007: Black Lips – "Veni Vidi Vici (Diplo Remix)"
- 2007: Hot Chip – "Shake a Fist (Diplo Remix)"
- 2007: Dark Meat – "Unsuccessful Space Jam (Diplo Mix)"
- 2008: Sunny Day Sets Fire – "Brainless (Mad Decent Remix)"
- 2008: Spoon – "Don't You Evah (Diplo Mix)"
- 2008: Kanye West – "Flashing Lights" (Diplo Remix)
- 2008: The Black Ghosts – "Repetition Kills You (Diplo Remix)"
- 2008: Marlena Shaw – "California Soul (Diplo Remix)"
- 2008: Radiohead – "Reckoner" (Diplo Mix)"
- 2008: Telepathe – "Chrome's On It (Mad Decent Remix)"
- 2008: PRGz – "Bama Gettin Money (Diplo Remix)"
- 2008: Journey to the West – "Monkey Bee (Diplo Remix)"
- 2009: Private – "My Secret Lover (Diplo Remix)"
- 2009: Britney Spears – "Circus (Diplo Circus Remix)"
- 2009: Britney Spears – "Circus (Diplo Alt Clown Mix)"
- 2009: Bassnectar – "Art of Revolution (Diplo Remix)"
- 2009: The Dead Weather – "Treat Me Like Your Mother (Diplo Remix)"
- 2009: As Tall As Lions – "Circles (Diplo Remix)"
- 2009: Feist – "I Feel It All (Diplo Remix)"
- 2009: Brazilian Girls – "Good Time (Diplo Remix)"
- 2010: Proxy – 8000 (Diplo Remix)
- 2010: Sia – "Clap Your Hands" (Diplo Remix)
- 2010: Madonna – Hung Up (Diplo Remix)
- 2010: Diplo – Summer's Gonna Hurt You (Diplo 2010 Remix)
- 2010: I Blame Coco – Caesar feat. Robyn (Diplo Remix)
- 2010: Maroon 5 – Misery (Diplo Put Me Out Of My Misery Mix)
- 2010: La Roux – Bulletproof (Diplo and Bot Remix)
- 2010: Deerhunter – Helicopter (Diplo and Lunice mix)
- 2010: Sunday Girl – Four Floors (Diplo Remix)
- 2010: Linkin Park – When They Come For Me (Diplo Remix) For DJ Hero 2
- 2010: Robyn – Dancehall Queen feat. Spoek Mathambo (Diplo and Stenchman Remix)
- 2011: Sleigh Bells – "Tell 'Em" (Diplo Remix)
- 2011: The Streets – "Going Through Hell" (Diplo Remix)
- 2011: Travis Barker – "Can a Drummer Get Some? (Diplo Remix)"
- 2011: Mavado – "Delilah (Diplo Remix)"
- 2011: Ceci Bastida – "Have You Heard? (Diplo Remix)"
- 2011: The Wombats – "Techno Fan (Diplo Remix)"
- 2011: Tiesto vs. Diplo featuring Busta Ryhmes – C'Mon (Catch 'Em By Surprise)
- 2011: The Bloody Beetroots – Church of Noise (Diplo Remix)
- 2011: Julianna Barwick – Vow (Diplo and Lunice Remix)
- 2011: Star Slinger featuring Reggie B – Dumbin' (Diplo Remix)
- 2012: FKi featuring Iggy Azalea & Diplo – "I Think She Ready"
- 2012: Usher – "Climax (Diplo Bouncier Climactic Remix)"
- 2012: Usher – "Climax (Flosstradamus and Diplo Remix)"
- 2012: Katy B – "Witches' Brew (Diplo Remix)"
- 2012: Sleigh Bells – "Demons (Diplo Remix)"
- 2012: Calvin Harris – Sweet Nothing feat. Florence Welch (Diplo and Grandtheft Remix)
- 2012: Psy – Gangnam Style feat. 2 Chainz and Tyga (Diplo Remix)
- 2013: Grizzly Bear – Will Calls (Diplo Remix)
- 2014: Avicii – You Make Me (Diplo and Ookay Remix)
- 2014: Beyoncé – Drunk in Love (Diplo Remix)
- 2014: Calvin Harris – Summer (Diplo & Grandtheft Remix)
- 2014: Lorde – Tennis Court (Diplo's Andre Agassi Reebok Pump Remix)
- 2014: Zola Jesus – "Go, Blank Sea (Diplo Remix)"
- 2014: CL – "MTBD (Mental Breakdown) (Diplo Remix)"
- 2015: QT – "Hey QT (Diplo Remix)"
- 2015: Rihanna – "Bitch Better Have My Money (Diplo & Grandtheft Remix)"
- 2015: Tiesto & KSHMR feat. Vassy – Secrets (Diplo Remix)
- 2016: MØ - Final Song (Diplo & Jauz remix)
- 2017: Yo Gotti feat. Nicki Minaj - Rake It Up (Diplo & Party Favor (DJ) remix)
- 2019: Lil Nas X & Billy Ray Cyrus - Old Town Road (Diplo remix)
- 2019: Robyn - Missing You (Silk City & Picard Brothers Remix)
- 2019: Carnage - Letting People Go (feat. Prinze George) (Diplo Remix)
- 2019: Kaskade, Felix Cartal, Jenn Blosil - More (Diplo Remix)
- 2019: Tove Lo - Glad He's Gone (Major Lazer Remix) / (Major Lazer Extended Remix)
- 2019: Niall Horan - Nice to Meet Ya (Diplo Remix)
- 2022: Diplo Self Titled Album Don't Forget My Love featuring Miguel High Rise featuring Leon Bridges and Amtrak Your Eyes featuring RYX One by One featuring Elderbrook and Andhim Promises featuring Paul Woolford and Kareen Lomax Right to Left featuring Busta Rhymes and Meje Humble featuring Lil Yachty On My Mind featuring Sidepiece Don't Be Afraid featuring Jungle and Damian Lazarus Let You Go featuring TSHA and Kareen Lomax Forget About Me featuring ALUNA and Durante
