= On My Mind (Diplo and Sidepiece song) =

Single by Diplo and Sidepiece

from the album Diplo and the EP Do You Dance?
- Released: December 13, 2019
- Genre: House; disco
- Length: 3:09
- Label: Higher Ground
- Songwriters: Missy Elliott; Chad James Elliott; Dylan Ragland; George Pearson; Melissa Elliott; Richard Cook Mears IV; Sting; Thomas Wesley Pentz
- Producers: Diplo; Sidepiece

Diplo singles chronology
"Samba Sujo" (2019)	"On My Mind" (2019)	"Bubble Up" (2019)

Music video
- "On My Mind" on YouTube

"On My Mind" is a song by American DJ and record producer Diplo and Sidepiece. It was released on December 13, 2019, via Higher Ground Records. The song features a sped-up vocalization sampled from "Steelo" (1996) by the R&B group 702.

== Composition ==
The song is written in the key of G minor, with a tempo of 123 beats per minute.

== Music video ==
On April 23, 2020. A video called "Do You Dance?" was released. According to the statement by Farrell Sweeney of Dancing Astronaut, the video is created with a new app Sway, and uses "AI-powered motion filters." It shows "a variety of people meeting and breaking out into intense dance." Subsequently the visual effect changes, dancers "beginning to punch and kick one another, strip their clothes, and the dancing restarts."

== Track listing ==
Digital download
No.	Title	Length
1.	"On My Mind"	3:09

Digital download – remixes
No.	Title	Length
1.	"On My Mind" (original)	3:09
2.	"On My Mind" (Purple Disco Machine remix)	4:23
3.	"On My Mind" (MK remix)	4:27
4.	"On My Mind" (Ferreck Dawn remix)	3:11
5.	"On My Mind" (Do You Dance? edit)	2:18

== Charts ==
=== Weekly charts ===
Weekly chart performance for "On My Mind"
Chart (2019–2020)	Peak position
Belgium (Ultratip Bubbling Under Flanders)	4
Belgium (Ultratip Bubbling Under Wallonia)	34
Hungary (Dance Top 40)	1
Hungary (Rádiós Top 40)	7
Hungary (Single Top 40)	10
Hungary (Stream Top 40)	25
Ireland (IRMA)	26
New Zealand Hot Singles (RMNZ)	39
UK Singles (Official Charts)	57
US Dance Club Songs (Billboard)	17
US Hot Dance/Electronic Songs (Billboard)	25

=== Year-end charts ===
2020 year-end chart performance for "On My Mind"
Chart (2020)	Position
Hungary (Dance Top 40)	9
Hungary (Rádiós Top 40)	53
Hungary (Single Top 40)	47
Hungary (Stream Top 40)	70
US Hot Dance/Electronic Songs (Billboard)	73

2021 year-end chart performance for "On My Mind"
Chart (2021)	Position
Hungary (Dance Top 40)	3
Hungary (Rádiós Top 40)	76

== Certifications ==
Certifications for "On My Mind"
Region	Certification	Certified units/sales
Austria (IFPI Austria)	Gold	15,000^{‡}
France (SNEP)	Gold	100,000^{‡}
Italy (FIMI)	Gold	35,000^{‡}
New Zealand (RMNZ)	Platinum	30,000^{‡}
Poland (ZPAV)	Gold	25,000^{‡}
United Kingdom (BPI)	Gold	400,000^{‡}
United States (RIAA)	Gold	500,000^{‡}
^{‡} Sales+streaming figures based on certification alone.
