= Chapter 2: Swamp Savant =

Studio album by Thomas Wesley
- Released: April 28, 2023
- Genres: Country; country pop; EDM
- Length: 26:41
- Labels: Mad Decent; Columbia
- Producer: Diplo

Diplo chronology
| Diplo (2022) | Chapter 2: Swamp Savant (2023) | The Mixtape (2024) |

Singles from Chapter 2: Swamp Savant
- 1. "Wasted" Released: January 13, 2023; 2. "Use Me (Brutal Hearts)" Released: April 2023; 3. "Sad in the Summer" Released: April 2023; 4. "Without You" Released: June 23, 2023; 5. "Heartbroken" Released: July 21, 2023

Chapter 2: Swamp Savant is the fifth studio album by American DJ and record producer Diplo, and the second to be released under his country music alias Thomas Wesley. It was released on April 28, 2023, through Mad Decent and Columbia Records. The album features guest appearances from Lily Rose, Dove Cameron, Johnny Blue Skies, Paul Cauthen, Sierra Ferrell, Morgan Wade, Parker McCollum, Kodak Black, Koe Wetzel, Elle King, Jessie Murph, and Polo G. Production was primarily handled by Diplo. The album serves as a sequel to his second studio album, Chapter 1: Snake Oil (2020), which was released three years earlier, and follows his fourth and self titled studio album, Diplo (2022).

== Background ==
Diplo prepared for the project by returning to his father’s house in Florida. He spent approximately six months learning guitar, reconnecting with nature, and working on a shrimp boat during full-moon runs. He stated that the project “all started in the swamps I was raised in” and called Swamp Savant “the greatest single piece of work I’ve ever done.”

The title references Diplo’s Mississippi and Florida roots. The project continues his approach of blending electronic production with country and Americana elements while prioritizing unexpected collaborations.

== Songs ==
The album opens with “Sad in the Summer”, a collaboration with Lily Rose that blends banjo and synth elements over a mid-tempo beat. “Use Me (Brutal Hearts)” pairs Dove Cameron with Sturgill Simpson (under his Johnny Blue Skies alias) over a disco-influenced production. “Rain on My Mind” features Paul Cauthen and Sierra Ferrell in a more atmospheric, folk-leaning track. “Never Die” showcases Morgan Wade’s raspy delivery on an outlaw-tinged song, while “Lonely Long” highlights Parker McCollum with reflective storytelling. The original edition closes with “Wasted”, a rock-leaning collaboration with Kodak Black and Koe Wetzel.

Later reissue tracks include “Without You” with Elle King and the dual versions of “Heartbroken” featuring Jessie Murph (one with Polo G and one as a solo Jessie Version).

== Release and promotion ==
Diplo announced the project in early April 2023, describing it as the follow-up to Chapter 1: Snake Oil. The album was released on April 28, 2023. He promoted it in connection with Stagecoach Festival, including curation of a HonkyTonk stage and his annual Late Night in Palomino set, and performed a Thomas Wesley show at the Wildhorse Saloon in Nashville.

== Singles ==
The lead single, “Wasted” (featuring Kodak Black and Koe Wetzel), was released on January 13, 2023, accompanied by a music video.

“Use Me (Brutal Hearts)” (featuring Dove Cameron and Johnny Blue Skies) was released in April 2023; its official video starred Sean Penn. “Sad in the Summer” (featuring Lily Rose) was also promoted around the album release.

On June 23, 2023, “Without You” (featuring Elle King) was released and later added as track 7 on reissue editions.

On July 21, 2023, “Heartbroken” (with Jessie Murph and Polo G) was released and added as track 8, followed by the “Jessie Version” as track 9.

== Critical reception ==
Critical response was mixed. AllMusic critic Stephen Thomas Erlewine described the original six-song core as a “breezy affair” and “shiny dance-pop,” noting that Diplo polished the featured artists’ vocal styles to fit his production rather than emphasizing traditional country elements. Erlewine observed that even Sturgill Simpson was placed over a refurbished disco beat and that the project “moves swiftly and softly.”

Other coverage noted the strength of certain songwriting moments (particularly “Lonely Long”) while criticizing the project for feeling inauthentic or for underutilizing certain guests such as Sierra Ferrell.

== Track listing ==
Chapter 2: Swamp Savant track listing
| No. | Title | Writer(s) | Producer(s) | Length |
|---|---|---|---|---|
| 1. | "Sad in the Summer" (with Lily Rose) | Thomas Wesley Pentz; Lily Rose; Henry Allen; Griffen Palmer; Geoff Warburton; Ben Johnson; Clément Picard; Maxime Picard | Diplo; King Henry; Picard Brothers | 3:21 |
| 2. | "Use Me (Brutal Hearts)" (with Dove Cameron and Johnny Blue Skies) | Pentz; Dove Cameron; Jay Malinowski; Clément Picard; Maxime Picard | Diplo; Picard Brothers | 3:22 |
| 3. | "Rain on My Mind" (with Paul Cauthen and Sierra Ferrell) | Pentz; Paul Cauthen | Diplo | 2:18 |
| 4. | "Never Die" (with Morgan Wade) | Pentz; Morgan Wade; Clément Picard; Maxime Picard | Diplo; Picard Brothers | 2:39 |
| 5. | "Lonely Long" (with Parker McCollum) | Pentz; Parker McCollum; Clément Picard; Maxime Picard | Diplo; Picard Brothers | 3:00 |
| 6. | "Wasted" (featuring Kodak Black and Koe Wetzel) | Pentz; Dieuson Octave; Koe Wetzel | Diplo | 2:35 |
| 7. | "Without You" (with Elle King) | Pentz; Elle King; Henry Allen | Diplo; King Henry | 3:02 |
| 8. | "Heartbroken" (with Jessie Murph and Polo G) | Pentz; Jessie Murph; Taurus Bartlett; Amy Allen; Elie Rizk; Ilsey Juber; Emeric Boxall | Diplo; Maesic; Elie Rizk | 3:24 |
| 9. | "Heartbroken (Jessie Version)" (with Jessie Murph) | Pentz; Jessie Murph; Amy Allen; Elie Rizk; Ilsey Juber; Emeric Boxall | Diplo; Maesic; Elie Rizk | 3:18 |
| Total length: | | | | 26:41 |

=== Notes ===
- Disc 2 of Chapter 2: Swamp Savant mirrors the track listing of the standard edition of Chapter 1: Snake Oil.

== Charts ==
Chart performance for Chapter 2: Swamp Savant
| Chart (2023–2024) | Peak position |
|---|---|
| US Hot Country Songs (Billboard) ("Heartbroken") | 14 |
| US Billboard Hot 100 ("Heartbroken") | 64 |

“Heartbroken” reached number 64 on the Billboard Hot 100 and number 14 on the Hot Country Songs chart.
