= 1nonly =

American underground rapper (born 2004)

- Born: Nathan Scott Fuller; April 6, 2004 (age 22)
- Origin: Las Vegas, Nevada
- Genres: Hip hop; emo rap; trap; phonk; memphis rap; gothic rap
- Occupations: Rapper; singer; songwriter
- Years active: 2019–present
- Label: Warner
- Website: www.1nonlyofficial.com

Nathan Scott Fuller (born April 6, 2004), known by his stage name 1nonly, is an American rapper known for his single "Stay With Me" which was released in 2020.

== Career ==
=== 2020–2024: Beginning, Stay With Me & others ===
"Stay With Me" which was released in 2020 and gained notoriety due to its popularity on apps like TikTok and Instagram. In 2021, he signed to Warner Records and released the single "Come Thru" featuring Ciscaux & Shady Moon. In 2022, 1nonly released his debut EP, "Homesick", supported by singles "Mine" and "Step Back!", a collaboration with SXMPRA. The release was followed by a tour in 2023. In June, he would release the single "Toolie Beam" in collaboration with rapper Pouya. In 2024, he switched genres, adapting to the new wave of music releasing singles like "VICODIN".

== Discography ==
=== Extended plays ===
Title	Details
Homesick	Released: November 18, 2022; Formats: Digital download, streaming, CD

Albums

Title	Details	Releases
ONLY IF I DIE, WOULD I NOT BE	Released: February 20, 2026; Formats: Digital download, streaming, CD	PLAYAZ NEVER DIE; TELL ME WHY; CHUMPCHANGE; GRAILED; 5 IN THE MORNIN'; LATELY; FLY; 30ROUNDCLIP; SKY; WHO GON' SLIDE; PUSH UP; MOVE FAST; MOVED ON

=== Singles ===
- Split
- Mine
- Scars
- Zoom!
- Step Back!
- Come Thru
- Falling
- Stalking
- Shut It
- Toolie Beam
- Come and go
- 67
