= Don't Forget My Love =

2022 single by Diplo and Miguel

Single by Diplo and Miguel

from the album Diplo
- Released: February 11, 2022
- Genre: Amapiano; house; dance-pop; future house; tropical house; nu-disco; slap house
- Length: 3:19
- Label: Higher Ground
- Songwriters: Bas van Daalen; Jasper Helderman; Maximilian Jaeger; Miguel Pimentel; Thomas Wesley Pentz
- Producers: Diplo; Maximilian Jaeger

Diplo singles chronology
"Forget About Me" (2022)	"Don't Forget My Love" (2022)	"Pogo" (2022)

Miguel singles chronology
"Happiness Over Everything (H.O.E.)" (2020)	"Don't Forget My Love" (2022)	"Give It to Me" (2023)

Music video
- "Don't Forget My Love" on YouTube

"Don't Forget My Love" is a song by American DJ and record producer Diplo and American singer Miguel. It was released on February 11, 2022, via Higher Ground Records from Diplo's self-titled fourth studio album. The song was written by the artists alongside Bas van Daalen, Jasper Helderman and Maximilian Jaeger, and was produced by Diplo and Jaeger. Diplo also released this as a music NFT sharing streaming revenues with owners. The song received a nomination for Best Dance/Electronic Recording at the 65th Annual Grammy Awards.

== Composition ==
The song is written in the key of D major, with a tempo of 121 beats per minute.

== Track listing ==
Digital download
No.	Title	Length
1.	"Don't Forget My Love"	3:19

Digital download – extended
No.	Title	Length
1.	"Don't Forget My Love" (Extended)	4:23
2.	"Don't Forget My Love" (Short edit)	2:55
3.	"Don't Forget My Love" (Extended – Tall Boys 100-121 Transition)	2:48

== Charts ==
=== Weekly charts ===
Weekly chart performance for "Don't Forget My Love"
Chart (2022–2024)	Peak position
Belgium (Ultratop 50 Wallonia)	22
CIS Airplay (TopHit)	168
Croatia (HRT)	29
Estonia Airplay (TopHit)	156
Ireland (IRMA)	33
Lithuania Airplay (TopHit)	263
Netherlands (Single Tip)	23
New Zealand Hot Singles (RMNZ)	8
Russia Airplay (TopHit)	307
San Marino (SMRRTV Top 50)	28
Slovakia Airplay (ČNS IFPI)	75
Suriname (Nationale Top 40)	2
Ukraine Airplay (TopHit)	73
UK Singles (OCC)	30
UK Dance (OCC)	9
US Hot Dance/Electronic Songs (Billboard)	6
US Pop Airplay (Billboard)	25

=== Year-end charts ===
2022 year-end chart performance for "Don't Forget My Love"
Chart (2022)	Position
Belgium (Ultratop 50 Wallonia)	90
US Hot Dance/Electronic Songs (Billboard)	20

== Certifications ==
Certifications for "Don't Forget My Love"
Region	Certification	Certified units/sales
New Zealand (RMNZ)	Gold	15,000^{‡}
United Kingdom (BPI)	Platinum	600,000^{‡}
United States (RIAA)	Gold	500,000^{‡}
^{‡} Sales+streaming figures based on certification alone.

== Release history ==
Release history for "Don't Forget My Love"
Region	Date	Format	Label	Ref.
Various	February 11, 2022	Digital download; streaming	Higher Ground	
Italy	February 11, 2022	Contemporary hit radio	Warner	
United States	March 8, 2022	Contemporary hit radio	Higher Ground; Mad Decent	

== See also ==
- List of Billboard number-one dance songs of 2022
