= Damian Lazarus =

British DJ and producer

Damian Lazarus is a British DJ and electronic music producer. He released his first album Smoke the Monster Out in May 2009, after two years of writing content for it.

== Discography ==
=== Albums ===
- Smoke the Monster Out, 2009.
- Fabric 54, Fabric, 2010.
- Message from the Other Side (Damian Lazarus & The Ancient Moons), 2015
- Heart of Sky (Damian Lazarus & The Ancient Moons), 2018
- Smoke the Monster Out, 2019
- Flourish, 2020
- Beijing Spring (Music Inspired by The Film), 2022
