= Florida (Diplo album) =

Studio album by Diplo
- Released: September 21, 2004
- Genre: Hip hop; trip hop
- Length: 55:28
- Label: Big Dada
- Producer: Diplo

Diplo chronology
Florida (2004)	FabricLive.24 (2005)

Professional ratings
Review scores
Source	Rating
AllMusic	3/5 stars
MusicOMH	favorable
Pitchfork	7.0/10
PopMatters	favorable
Spin	B−
Tiny Mix Tapes	4/5 marks
XLR8R	favorable

Florida is the debut studio album by American DJ Diplo. It was released on Big Dada in 2004. In 2014, it was re-released as F10rida, with 10 extra tracks added, plus bonus commentary.

== Critical reception ==
Florida was described by Ian Roullier of MusicOMH as "an excellent, diverse collection of instrumental hip hop excursions, laid back grooves and whacked out rap tracks." Tim O'Neil of PopMatters said, "Diplo has crafted one of the year's best debut albums, an ambitious ode to the art and craft of sampling."

== Track listing ==
No.	Title	Length
1.	"Florida"	1:36
2.	"Big Lost"	4:39
3.	"Sarah"	5:26
4.	"Into the Sun" (featuring Martina Topley-Bird)	5:53
5.	"Way More"	5:56
6.	"Money Power Respect"	3:51
7.	"Diplo Rhythm" (featuring Sandra Melody, Vybz Kartel and Pantera Os Danadinhos)	4:53
8.	"Works"	8:52
9.	"Indian Thick Jawns" (featuring P.E.A.C.E.)	3:55
10.	"Summer's Gonna Hurt You"	8:41
11.	"It's All Part of a Bigger Plan"	1:46

F10rida extra tracks
No.	Title	Length
12.	"Epistemology Suite 1: Don't Fall"	7:07
13.	"Epistemology Suite 2: Like Cats"	1:22
14.	"Epistemology Suite 3: You're Enron"	3:08
15.	"As I Lay Dying"	3:53
16.	"Flute Jawn"	3:51
17.	"Making It Hard"	2:51
18.	"Now's the Time (F10rida Rework)"	3:18
19.	"Newsflash (Metronomy Remix)"	4:34
20.	"Summer's Gonna Hurt You (Derek Allen Version)"	4:50
21.	"Big Lost (Eprom Remix)"	5:19
22.	"F10rida Album Commentary" (bonus track)	9:52
