= FabricLive.24 =

Remix album by Diplo
- Released: 2005
- Genres: Electronic, hip hop
- Length: 79:50
- Label: Fabric
- Producer: Diplo

Diplo chronology
Piracy Funds Terrorism (2004)	FabricLive.24 (2005)	Top Ranking: A Diplo Dub (2008)

FabricLive chronology
FabricLive.23 (2005)	FabricLive.24 (2005)	FabricLive.25 (2005)

Professional ratings
Review scores
Source	Rating
AllMusic	4/5 stars
Exclaim!	favorable
Pitchfork	6.8/10
Tiny Mix Tapes	3/5 stars

FabricLive.24 is a 2005 DJ mix compilation album by Diplo.

== Critical reception ==
John Bush of AllMusic gave the album 4 stars out of 5, saying, "Aside from the familiar track selection, Diplo is magnificent in the mix, continually showing why he's one of the most popular party DJs around." Dimitri Nasrallah of Exclaim! called it "one of the most impressive mixes of the year." Meanwhile, Tom Breihan of Pitchfork gave the album a 6.8 out of 10, saying, "the great thing about Diplo has always been his ecstatic embrace of chaos, and we don't get a whole lot of that here."

== Track listing ==
No.	Title	Artist(s)	Length
1.	"Love 4 the World (Why They Gotta Hate?)/Turnin' Me On"	Plantlife/Nina Sky	3:27
2.	"My Chrome" (featuring Big Boi)	Killer Mike	1:50
3.	"Clear"	Cybotron	2:44
4.	"Don't Go"	Yazoo	2:25
5.	"When I Hear Music"	Debbie Deb	3:19
6.	"Don't Stop the Rock"	Freestyle	3:05
7.	"Al-Naafiysh (The Soul)"	Hashim	3:01
8.	"Nightdrive (Thru Babylon)"	Model 500	2:18
9.	"Windowlicker"	Aphex Twin	1:01
10.	"Percolator"	Cajmere	1:49
11.	"This Is Sick"	Solid Groove	2:50
12.	"Love Guide" (featuring Ms. Thing)	Two Culture Clash	2:11
13.	"What's Your Fantasy" (featuring Shawnna)	Ludacris	3:26
14.	"Percão"	Diplo	2:18
15.	"Vem Cristiano"	Gaiola Das Popozudas	2:02
16.	"Cria Cria Periquita"	MC Biro Leyby	2:21
17.	"Ô Darcy"	Gaiola Das Popozudas	2:34
18.	"Way More (Remix)/Bucky Done Gun"	Diplo/M.I.A.	2:21
19.	"Destruction VIP"	Jammer	3:13
20.	"Love Song"	The Cure	2:41
21.	"B.O.B."	Outkast	4:13
22.	"Deceptacon"	Le Tigre	3:10
23.	"Hurricane"	DJ Nasty	3:16
24.	"Freaks"	DJ Deeon	2:39
25.	"Notorious"	Turbulence	2:19
26.	"Free"	Cat Power	3:17
