= Diplo =

American DJ and record producer (born 1978)

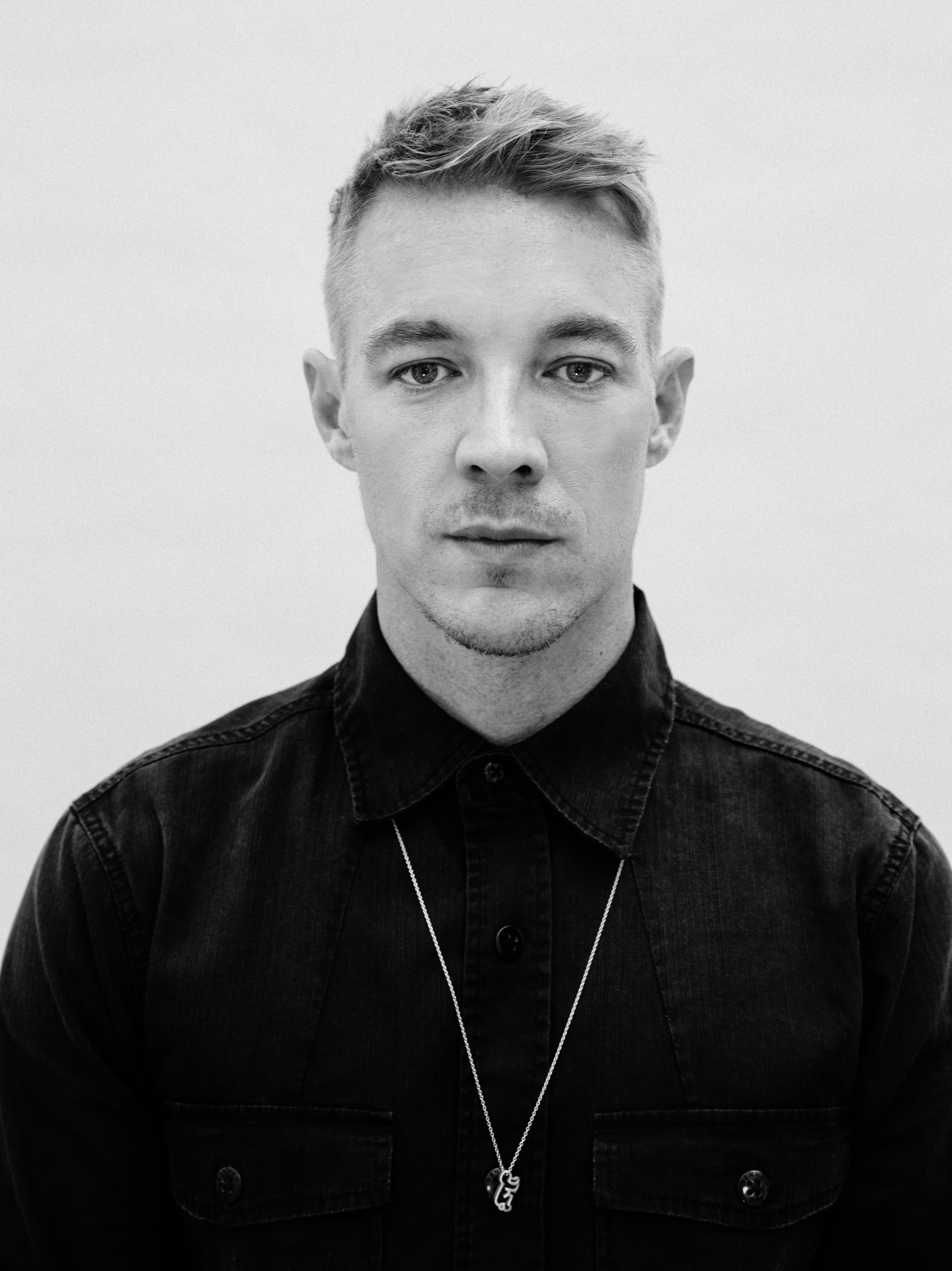
- Diplo in 2014
- Born: Thomas Wesley Pentz; November 10, 1978 (age 48); Tupelo, Mississippi, U.S.
- Other names: Diplodocus; Thomas Wesley
- Education: Temple University (BS)
- Occupations: DJ; record producer
- Years active: 1997–present
- Works: Discography; production
- Children: 4
- Musical career
- Origin: Philadelphia, Pennsylvania, U.S.
- Genres: EDM; trap; hip-hop; pop; moombahton
- Labels: Mad Decent; Atlantic; Columbia
- Member of: Major Lazer; Silk City
- Formerly of: LSD; Jack Ü
- Website: diplo.com

Signature
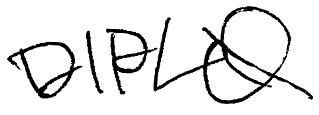

Thomas Wesley "Wes" Pentz Jr. (born November 10, 1978), known professionally as Diplo, is an American DJ and record producer. He gained recognition in 2008 with his single "Blow Your Head". He is a co-creator and lead member of the electronic dancehall music project Major Lazer; a member of the supergroup LSD, with Labrinth and Sia; a member of electronic duo Jack Ü, with producer and DJ Skrillex; and a member of Silk City, with Mark Ronson. He founded the record company Mad Decent in 2006 and the nonprofit organization Heaps Decent in 2007. His 2013 extended play (EP) Revolution debuted at number 68 on the US Billboard 200. Its title track was later featured in a Hyundai commercial and appears on the WWE 2K16 soundtrack.

Diplo worked with and dated British musician M.I.A., producing her 2008 breakout single "Paper Planes". In 2011, he and fellow producer Switch formed the electronic musical group Major Lazer and its namesake cartoon series for FXX, which ran for one season. The group released five studio albums that explored EDM and dancehall music. Since then, Diplo has produced for and collaborated with many mainstream musical acts, including Drake, BTS, Blackpink, Lil Peep, Gwen Stefani, Die Antwoord, Britney Spears, Madonna, Shakira, Beyoncé, Ellie Goulding, the Weeknd, No Doubt, Justin Bieber, Usher, Anitta, Snoop Dogg, Trippie Redd, Chris Brown, CL, G-Dragon, Bad Bunny, Kali Uchis, Joji, Morgan Wallen, Bailey Zimmerman, MØ, and Poppy. In 2016, Diplo produced tracks for Beyoncé's sixth studio album, Lemonade. His alias, short for Diplodocus, derives from his childhood fascination with dinosaurs.

== Early life and career ==
=== Early life ===
Thomas Wesley Pentz was born on November 10, 1978, in Tupelo, Mississippi, the son of Barbara Jean (née Cox) and Thomas Pentz. He is of English and German descent.

Home-grown rap shaped Diplo's production style. Though born in Mississippi, he spent most of his youth in Miami, where he got a taste for the characteristic Miami bass. He began attending the University of Central Florida in 1997. During his time at UCF, he became a DJ at local radio station WPRK, at Rollins College. He moved to Philadelphia to continue his studies at Temple University, where he first drew attention as a DJ. At age 20, Diplo moved to India, with a small bag and barely any money. He purchased a used Enfield Motorcycle and traveled in Ladakh, Uttarakhand, West Bengal, and Gujarat. While in India he collected records, and visited rundown establishments to listen to people playing the sitar and tabla.

After returning to the U.S. he became acquainted with fellow DJ Low Budget. The two began throwing parties under the "Hooked on Hollertronix" moniker in 2003 as a way to maintain control of what they could play during DJ gigs in Philadelphia. The success of these parties allowed the two to release mixtapes, both separately and together, gathering acclaim nationwide. One of these, Never Scared, was named one of The New York Times' top ten albums of 2003, and the Hollertronix name became synonymous with parties featuring guests like Maluca Mala, Bun B, Spank Rock, and M.I.A. Hollertronix's sound has been described as "disparate genres to be smashed together for maximum attention-grabbing impact", an aesthetic inspired by the "organic, cohesive, whole" aesthetic of acts such as Bun B, Lil Jon, Drama, M.I.A., Björk, and Busta Rhymes.

Diplo eschewed the club aesthetic of his Hollertronix music for a more reflective sound on his solo debut, Florida, which was released on the Ninja Tune imprint Big Dada Records. Florida was pressed twice, first as a CD and then as a CD/DVD Set. The DVD was put together by artist and filmmaker System D-128, who has also collaborated with Diplo on audio and film projects. Before Florida's DVD accompaniment, another DVD, Diplo: "Banned in Libya", was released by Money Studies, the first label to release a solo project by Diplo under his original DJ name, Diplodocus. It was a 45 rpm record called "Thingamajawn" for which there is also a video System D-128 directed. Like the Florida DVD, "Banned in Libya" is an experimental audio and video mix of Diplo's original music blended with a number of other unidentified sources. His affinity for the genre of baile funk, or favela funk, spawned a series of mixtapes (Favela on Blast, Favela Strikes Back), which brought the Brazilian dance music of the ghettos to the United States.

It was not long before his Hooked on Hollertronix parties gave him the success necessary to build a studio where music became his full-time focus. With this goal in mind, Diplo built "The Mausoleum", a video studio, recording studio, record label office, gallery, and event space in Philadelphia. Artists such as Christina Aguilera, Shakira, M.I.A., Santigold, Spank Rock, Plastic Little, Blaqstarr, and Paper Route Gangstaz have recorded at The Mausoleum. It has also hosted concerts by Glass Candy, Skream, Boys Noize, and Nicos Gun.

=== M.I.A. ===
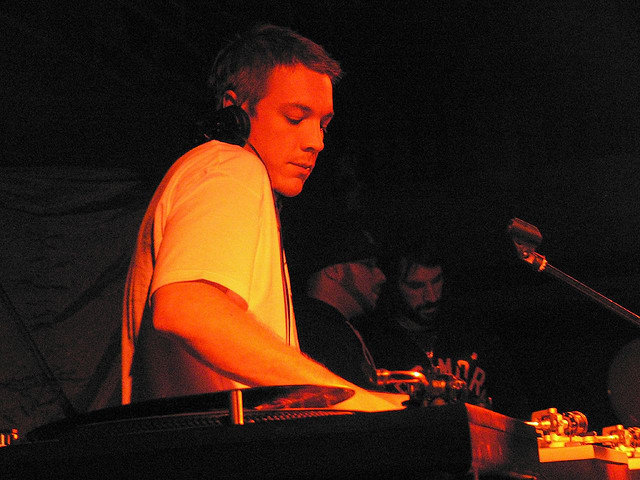
Diplo performing at Haverford College in 2005

After hearing one of his songs in 2004, M.I.A. approached Diplo when he was DJing one night at the Fabric Club in London. Coincidentally, Diplo was playing her songs "Galang" and "Fire Fire" as she entered the club, which he got from a worker at i-D magazine. Diplo added, "She came through and she wanted to meet me 'cause she'd heard my single and the funk mix from one of her A&Rs and she just thought I was right up her alley. Besides me being a white dude from Florida and her being a Sri Lankan girl in England, everything else was the same: [We were both] film graduates, [listened to] all the same music when we were kids, we're going in the same direction right now in music, it was amazing. ... I always wanted to make a beat with her, but all my beats were really shitty at the time."

The two eventually collaborated on a mixtape, Piracy Funds Terrorism Vol. 1, where Arular track acapellas were mashed with other artists' songs. It was listed among 'Albums of the Year' by The New York Times and Pitchfork Media. The two continued to work together after the release. He was the tour DJ on her 2005 Arular Tour.

Diplo continued to work with M.I.A. and, through her, met London DJ Switch. Together, they created the Grammy-nominated track "Paper Planes", peaking at number 4 on the Billboard Hot 100. In 2015, during an interview with Rolling Stone, M.I.A said that Diplo resented her rise to fame in 2005, that he tried to hold her back, and fought with her about becoming successful.

=== Mad Decent ===
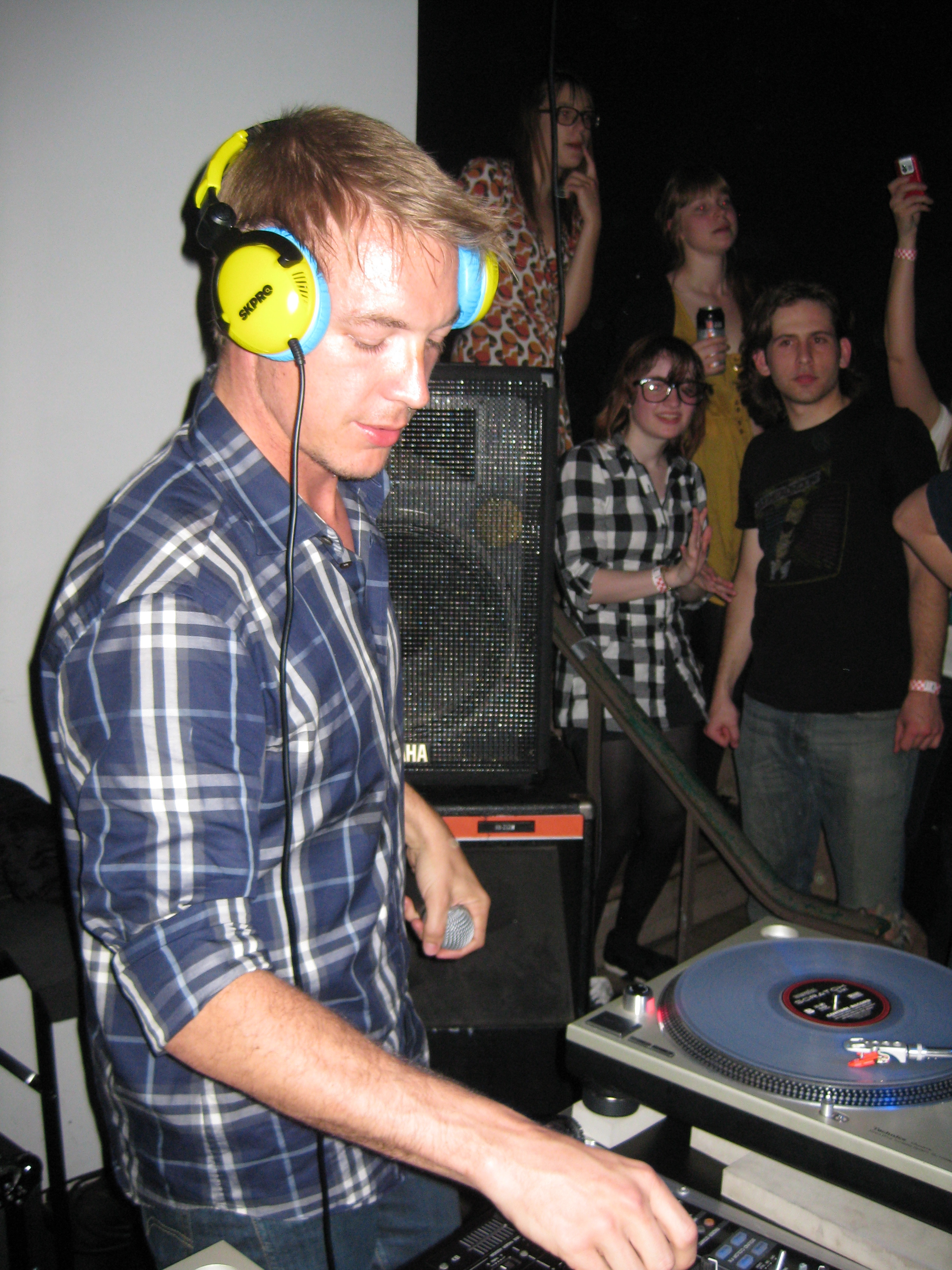
Diplo performing at Soundlab in Buffalo, New York, May 2009

From this, Diplo went from being an unknown DJ to taking off as a producer, landing him collaborations with artists like Shakira, Robyn, Kid Cudi, Bruno Mars, No Doubt and Snoop Dogg, as well as work with Maluca, Kid Sister, Die Antwoord, Alex Clare, Rolo Tomassi, Amanda Blank and Dark Meat. After taking a trip to Brazil to investigate the favela music scene, and fascinated with the energy the scene had to offer, Diplo decided to import a dance-funk group Bonde do Rolê from Brazil for release on his Mad Decent record label, also housed within 'The Mausoleum'. This group would serve to define funk carioca in the United States, spawning a host of others to join the movement. Diplo also spent some time documenting the music, and the favelas of Brazil.

Although favela funk remained an interest (the Favela on Blast documentary saw release in 2009), his Mad Decent imprint would serve as a blank palette for Diplo to showcase the myriad different sounds he had come across while touring around the world. September 2009 even saw Diplo travel to China to play with Steve Aoki at a show organized by promoters Split Works. Diplo quickly developed a reputation for his extensive touring. In the April 2010 issue of Rolling Stone, Diplo was touted as one of '40 Reasons to be Excited About Music'. This kind of jet setting pushed his label far beyond the favela funk genre with which it initially began. Since its foundation in 2005 Diplo's Mad Decent label has released music by Santigold, Baauer, Lil' Jon, Gucci Mane, Peter Bjorn and John, Rusko, Bosco Delrey, Buraka Som Sistema, Savage Skulls, Dana Sibuea, Oliver Twizt, Jamie Fanatic, Douster, Boy 8-Bit, and Popo.

As Mad Decent continues to grow and release tracks by big-name artists, Diplo's solo career continues to grow as well. He has produced for artists such as Beyoncé, Justin Bieber, Lil Wayne, Britney Spears, Wale, Chris Brown, Ariana Grande, 2 Chainz, Travis Porter, Usher, Azealia Banks, Iggy Azalea, and AlunaGeorge. On October 16, 2015, Diplo released "Be Right There" along with fellow producer Sleepy Tom. The single charted in multiple countries and has over 100 million streams on Spotify.

On April 23, 2016, Beyoncé released her critically acclaimed album, Lemonade. Diplo produced two tracks on the album, "All Night", and one of the three singles, "Hold Up". The album debuted at number one on the US Billboard 200 and was certified platinum on June 8, 2016. Along with producing tracks on Beyoncé's Lemonade, Diplo collaborated with Canadian DJ duo Zeds Dead on the release "Blame", which featured Swedish singer Elliphant. The track was officially released on July 14, 2016, via Zeds Dead's SoundCloud.

=== Major Lazer ===
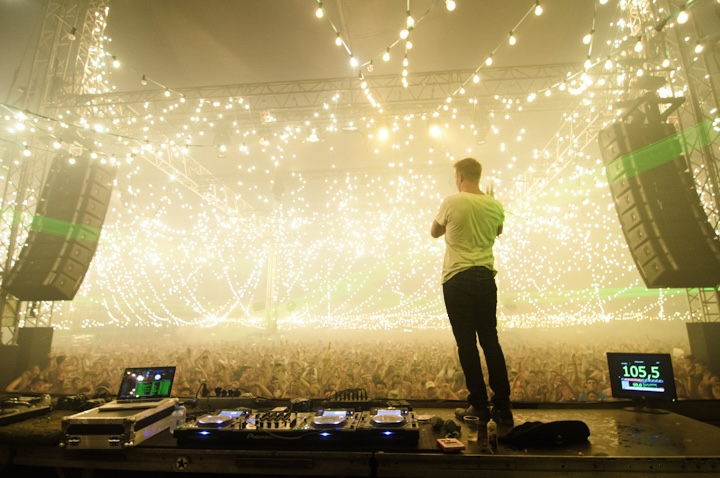
Diplo performing at Pukkelpop in 2012

Diplo's first collaborative full-length record was with Switch, this time under the guise of Major Lazer. Diplo incorporates such disparate influences as Miami Bass and Baile Funk into the high-tech eclecticism of his productions. After landing a deal with Downtown Records before even recording a note of music, Diplo and Switch set out for Jamaica to record a project that, like most of Diplo's projects before it, would highlight the little-known subgenres, this time of Jamaica's dancehall scene.

The two received support by many already established Jamaican artists such as Vybz Kartel, Elephant Man and Ms. Thing, and the resulting record Guns Don't Kill People... Lazers Do also featured vocals from Santigold, Amanda Blank, Nina Sky, Ricky Blaze and more. When discussing the Major Lazer project, Diplo described the dancehall sound as being " the end of the world, all the little influences—house, soca, oldies, R&B, jazz—it all ends up in Jamaica." The track "Pon De Floor" from Guns Don't Kill People... Lazers Do was sampled for Beyoncé's single "Run the World (Girls)".

Major Lazer's first album was followed up with an EP, Lazers Never Die, which was released in 2010. Switch left Major Lazer in 2011, and was replaced by DJs Jillionaire and Walshy Fire. A second album, Free the Universe, was scheduled to be released in November 2012 but was delayed to February 2013, and then to April 15. It features artists such as Ezra Koenig, Bruno Mars, Ward 21, Wyclef, The Partysquad, Shaggy, Tyga, Flux Pavilion and Wynter Gordon.

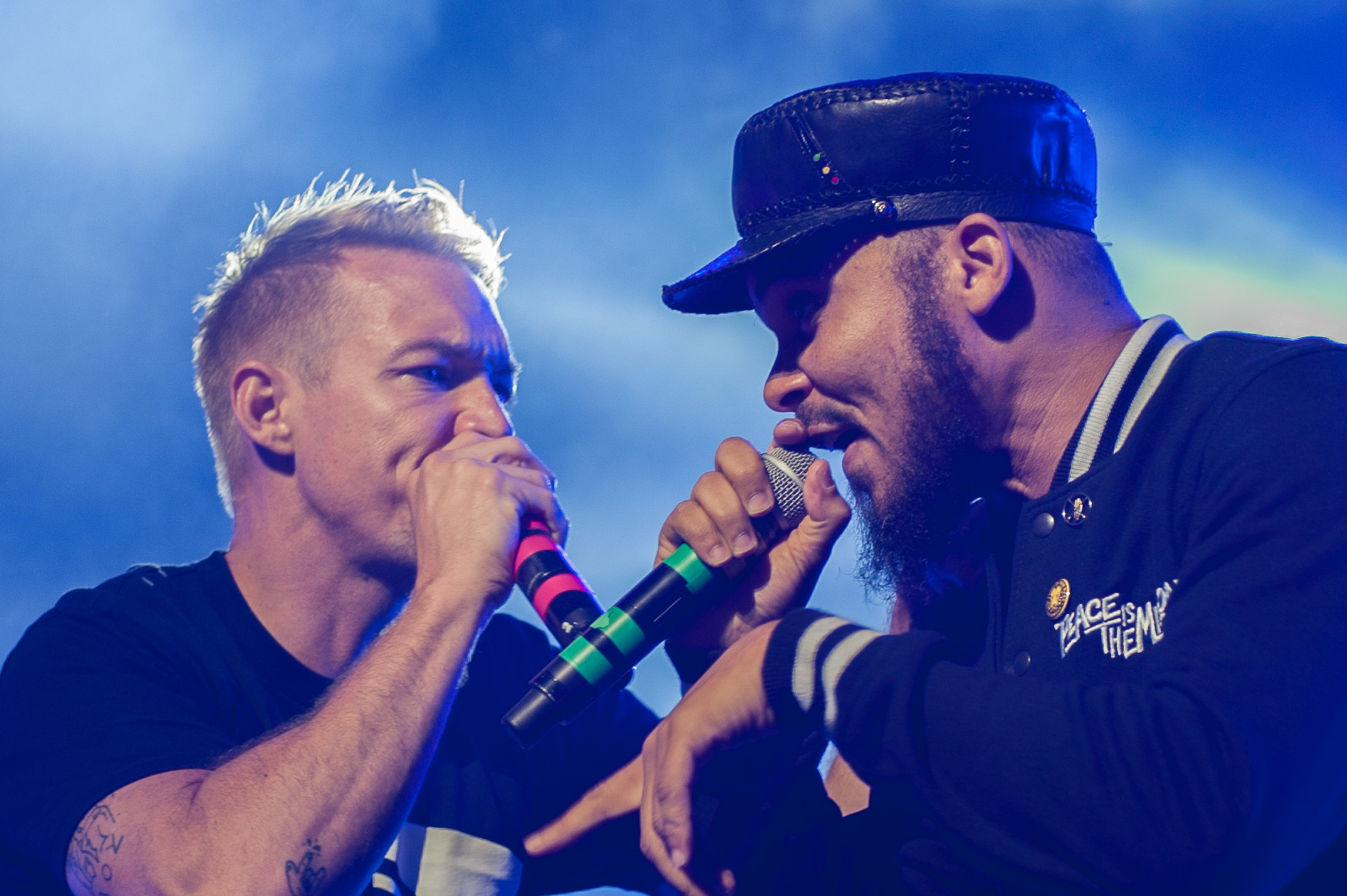
Diplo and Walshy Fire of Major Lazer performing at Flow Festival in Helsinki, August 2015

On February 8, 2015, during the Grammy Award ceremony, Diplo revealed details of the third Major Lazer album. He confirmed that the album would incorporate artists such as Ariana Grande, Ellie Goulding and Pusha T. It is called Peace Is the Mission. The first single, "Lean On", is a collaboration with French producer DJ Snake and features vocals from Danish recording artist MØ. The second single, "Powerful", featuring Ellie Goulding and Tarrus Riley, was released simultaneously with the album on June 1, 2015.

On November 11, 2015, "Lean On" became Spotify's Most Streamed Song of All Time with over 800 million streams to date. Along with the streaming title, the official video for "Lean On" became one of the most viewed videos on YouTube. As of October 2024, it has more than 3.6 billion views. Along with the streaming and viewing milestones, "Lean On" would also go on to achieve double platinum status.

On July 22, 2016, the group released the single "Cold Water", a collaboration with Canadian artist Justin Bieber and Danish singer MØ. As of the track has reached over 200 million streams on Spotify, and achieved international commercial success, reaching number one in multiple countries. On November 29, 2016, Major Lazer and Bad Royale released "My Number", a track that samples "54-46 That's My Number" which Pitchfork describes as, "a genre-defining classic from legendary ska/reggae group Toots and the Maytals." This release contained newly recorded vocals from frontman Toots Hibbert specifically designed for Major Lazer, which changed the original lyrics to incorporate the group into the song while keeping the original melody. Their fifth studio album, Music Is the Weapon, features collaborations with Alessia Cara, French Montana, Anitta, Khalid, Skip Marley, Marcus Mumford, J Balvin, El Alfa, Mr Eazi and Nicki Minaj.

=== Jack Ü ===
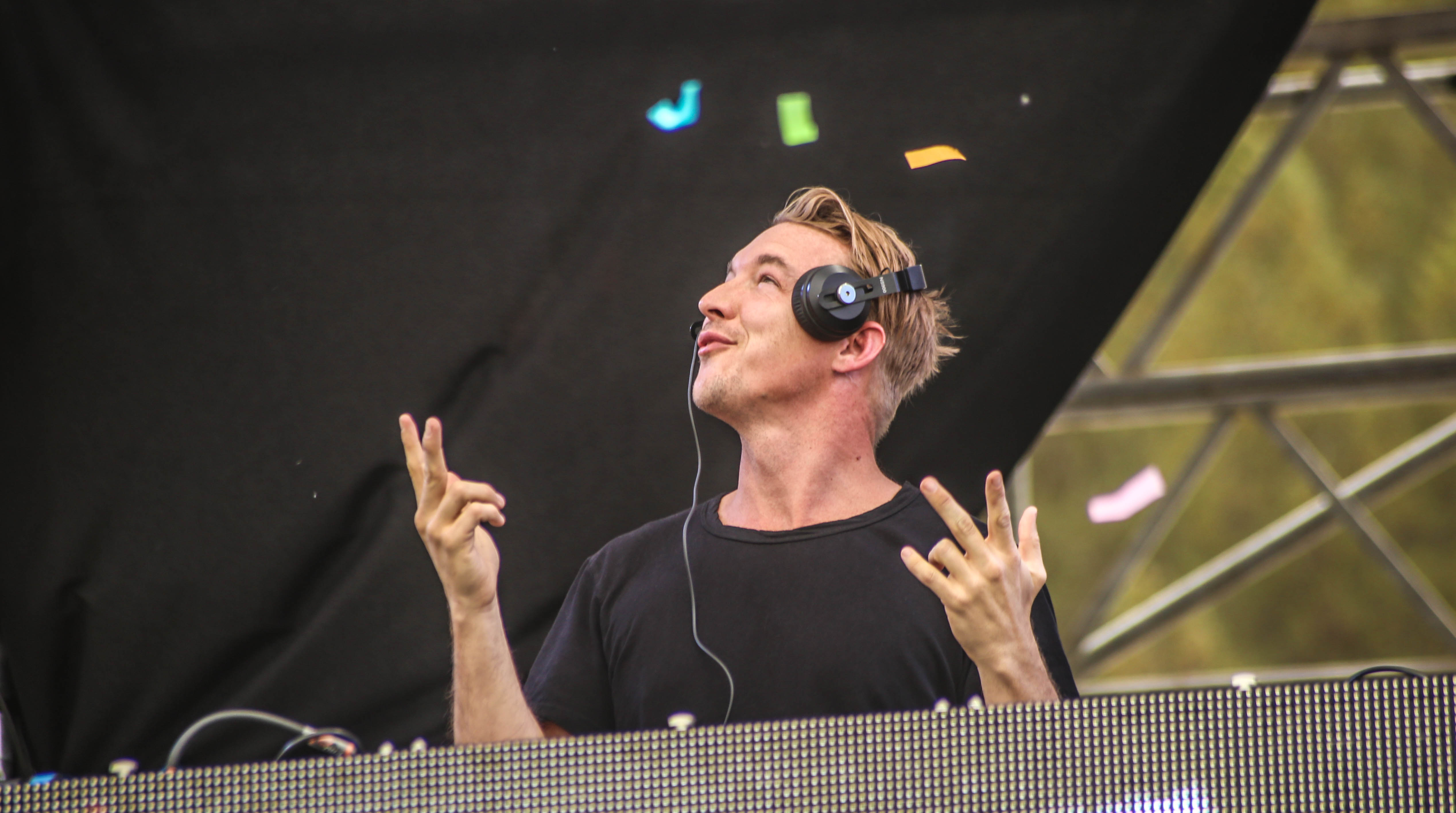
Diplo performing at Utopía Festival in Madrid, June 2016

Jack Ü is an American duo made up of Skrillex and Diplo. Jack Ü's debut performance took place at the Mad Decent Block Party in San Diego on September 15, 2013, which is a nationwide tour that record label Mad Decent puts together to showcase different artists signed to the label. Diplo announced the project by releasing the Mad Decent Block Party lineup with Jack Ü playing at multiple stops on the tour. After some guessing by many of who Jack Ü was, Diplo finally came out to reveal that "Jack Ü ... means Skrillex and Diplo together". After their New York debut at Electric Zoo was canceled in late August, the duo would soon return to the city for something bigger. On December 31, 2014, Jack Ü sold out Madison Square Garden for one of their biggest performances to date. The duo had support from Rudimental, Yellow Claw and A$AP Ferg.

On February 27, 2015, they released Skrillex and Diplo Present Jack Ü, a co-release between their respective labels Owsla and Mad Decent. The album was presented by surprise during a 24-hour DJ set which was broken up by the police at the 18-hour mark. It featured tracks with 2 Chainz, Kiesza, Justin Bieber, AlunaGeorge and Missy Elliott. The first single "Take Ü There" featuring Kiesza was the lead single on the duo's debut album. The single was released as the lead on October 4, 2014. It reached number sixteen on the UK Dance Chart. The official second single, "Where Are Ü Now" featured a collaboration with Canadian pop star Justin Bieber and was released simultaneously with the album.

Peaking at number 8 on the Billboard Hot 100, and number 3 on the UK Singles Chart, "Where Are Ü Now" became the duo's largest hit on both charts thus far. The song would also go on to peak at number three in Australia, which was the highest charting for the single worldwide. The song had huge success in Europe as well, reaching the top-ten in Sweden and Finland, and the top-twenty in Norway, the Czech Republic, Denmark and Slovakia. The final place it had charting success was Bieber's home country, Canada, where it would end up peaking at number 6. On March 29, 2015, Jack Ü closed the main stage at Ultra Music Festival in Miami, which included Justin Bieber, Diddy, and others.

In 2016, the duo won two Grammy Awards for Grammy Award for Best Dance/Electronic Music Album for "Skrillex and Diplo present Jack Ü" and Grammy Award for Best Dance Recording for "Where Are Ü Now?" with Justin Bieber. The latter was also Bieber's first Grammy. They played two sold-out shows including Coachella Valley Music Festival in Indio, California and Lollapalooza in São Paulo, Brazil.

=== LSD ===
LSD is a pop supergroup composed of Diplo, Australian singer Sia, and British musician Labrinth. The trio have released five singles thus far, with their song "Thunderclouds" being featured in a commercial for the Samsung Galaxy Note9. Their singles "Genius" and "Audio" have seen official remixes from producers Banx & Ranx and Cid, respectively. LSD's debut album Labrinth, Sia & Diplo Present... LSD was released on April 12, 2019.

=== Silk City ===
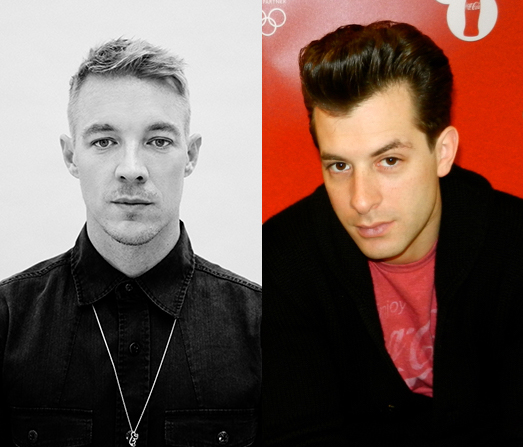
Diplo and Mark Ronson formed Silk City in 2018

On January 2, 2018, Diplo announced a new project with British DJ and singer Mark Ronson, entitled Silk City. The duo released their debut single "Only Can Get Better" featuring Daniel Merriweather on May 23, 2018. Their second single, "Feel About You" featuring Mapei, was released on July 20, 2018. The duo's third single, "Loud", saw Diplo reunite with previous collaborators GoldLink & Desiigner. Their 4th and most recent single features British singer-songwriter Dua Lipa, called "Electricity", which was released on September 5, 2018. The music video was released on the same day. In 2018, "Electricity" won a Grammy at the 61st Annual Grammy Awards for Best Dance Recording.

=== Additional work ===
Beyond Major Lazer and Mad Decent, Diplo has continued to show support for 'all the little influences', the lesser-known music scenes around the globe. Most recently his focus shifted to the Bounce scene in New Orleans, Louisiana for a television piece commissioned by Current.tv. Diplo was nominated for Non-Classical Producer of the Year at the 55th Grammy Awards and 58th Grammy Awards. Diplo had a late night show on BBC Radio 1 / 1Xtra on Saturdays 11:00 p.m.–1:00 a.m. (GMT) called 'Diplo and Friends' where he curated mixes from some of biggest names in dance music. He has now resigned from BBC Radio 1, per 2021. Diplo also has several syndicated Diplo and Friends shows in the United States in Boston, Bakersfield, Cleveland, Columbus, Las Vegas, Spokane, Albuquerque, Lafayette, Denver, and most notably on Los Angeles' 98.7 every Sunday at 9 pm.

Beginning on October 2, 2015, Diplo, Jillionaire, Walshy Fire and Eric Hamilton debuted "Lazer Sound" on Apple Music's Beats 1. The newest radio show, curated by Diplo, and the Major Lazer crew, consists of interviews, moments on tour and brand new music. The show is on the air every other Saturday of the month. Throughout 2015 and 2016, Diplo performed with Major Lazer and Jack Ü on numerous live TV and award shows. He performed on The Tonight Show, Good Morning America, the iHeart Radio Music Festival, The NRJ Music Awards, the 2015 Latin Grammy Awards and the 2016 Grammy Awards.

In February 2016, Diplo was one of the first and very few mainstream Western artists to perform in Islamabad, Pakistan alongside Adil Omar, Talal Qureshi, SNKM and Elliphant.

In 2018 Diplo returned with Major Lazer for Islamabad's first Mad Decent Block Party alongside Adil Omar, SNKM, Talal Qureshi, Valentino Khan, Chrome Sparks, Lyari Underground and a host of other acts. In January 2017, Diplo and Autoerotique (a house group from Toronto) released a music video titled "Waist Time" which was filmed in a warehouse in London. He was nominated for two Grammy's in 2016 (The 59th Annual GRAMMY Awards) for Album of the Year (for producer of Beyoncé's album Lemonade and producer for Justin Bieber's album Purpose). He also sang a song "Phurrr" in Bollywood in Imtiaz Ali's film Jab Harry Met Sejal starring Shah Rukh Khan and Anushka Sharma.

In 2019, Diplo released the song "So Long" under the moniker Thomas Wesley, featuring American country singer Cam. In a press release, he stated that there are "several forthcoming collaborations with country artists" planned following "So Long", which came in the form of Diplo Presents Thomas Wesley, Chapter 1: Snake Oil released in 2020. The album included the song "Heartless" featuring Morgan Wallen. On March 6, 2025, Diplo announced a concert to support the aid for firefighters during the 2025 California wildfires.

== Personal life ==
Diplo has three sons, two with Kathryn Lockhart and one with model Jevon King. He welcomed a fourth child, a daughter, as of 2025.

He dated M.I.A. from 2003 to 2008.

Diplo is a soccer and cricket fan and supports the U.S. men's national team. He created a mix for the 2014 FIFA World Cup and produced the 2018 World Cup official song "Live It Up". Diplo purchased a minority share of Phoenix Rising FC of the USL Championship on January 27, 2016.

On February 24, 2016, Diplo endorsed Bernie Sanders as the Democratic presidential nominee. Sanders' ad "It's A Revolution" is soundtracked by Diplo's 2013 track "Revolution". On June 9, 2016, Diplo was featured on the cover of the American entertainment media magazine Billboard.

On May 1, 2019, Diplo live-streamed Joe Jonas's Las Vegas wedding to Sophie Turner on Instagram, "not knowing it was a serious wedding". Soon thereafter, the couple said Diplo ruined their wedding. Five months later, Diplo and the Jonas Brothers released a song titled "Lonely". Its video chronicles Diplo's attempts to make amends with Joe Jonas and his brothers.

On July 9, 2020, Diplo joined Senator Kamala Harris and other artists for the "Get Up, Stand Up!" virtual fundraiser in support of Joe Biden's 2020 presidential campaign.

On March 14, 2023, Diplo said, "I don't want to define that I'm gay but I think the best answer that I have is I'm not not gay", in an interview with Emily Ratajkowski.

In August 2023, Diplo attended and played from a hot air balloon at the 35th Burning Man festival in Black Rock City, Nevada. After a rainstorm turned the festival grounds into a mud pit, he escaped on foot and hitchhiked out with comedian Chris Rock.

=== Legal issues ===
In November 2020, Shelly Auguste filed for a restraining order against Diplo, alleging he posted explicit images of her online as retaliation. She claimed they met in 2014 when she was 17 and he was in his mid-30s. In December 2020, Diplo filed a counter restraining order in retaliation, calling Auguste an "obsessed fan" who harassed him after their brief relationship ended. He maintained they first met in March 2018, not 2014, and had consensual encounters in April and July 2019.

By January 2025, after over four years of contentious legal battles, both parties announced a "resolution in principle" that averted a trial scheduled to begin the next week. Rolling Stone reported on January 6, 2025, that Diplo's lawyer Brian Elliot Turnauer told the court: "We have a resolution in principle. We're probably days, not weeks, away from getting it signed. There are one or two paragraphs to kind of tweak." Judge Rolf M. Treu vacated the trial date after Auguste's lawyer, Kimberly Casper, confirmed agreement with the settlement. The legal battle culminated in a $1.2 million arbitration award to Diplo in 2022 for Auguste's violation of their mutual restraining order. Court records from the Los Angeles County Superior Courts (cases 20STRO06258 and 21STCV16321) indicate details of the judgment are still sealed in these cases.

== Discography ==
Studio albums

- Florida (2004)
- Chapter 1: Snake Oil (as Thomas Wesley) (2020)
- MMXX (2020)
- Diplo (2022)
- Chapter 2: Swamp Savant (as Thomas Wesley) (2023)
- D00mscrvll (as D00mscrvll) (2026)

Collaborative studio albums

- Jack Ü (with Skrillex, as Jack Ü) (2015)
- LSD (with Labrinth and Sia, as LSD) (2019)

== Filmography ==
=== Film ===
| Year | Title | Role | Notes |
|---|---|---|---|
| 2008 | Favela on Blast | Himself | Also director |
| 2010 | Malice N Wonderland | Waiter No. 2 | Short film |
| 2014 | 22 Jump Street | Himself | Cameo |
| 2015 | 808 | Himself | Musical documentary |
| 2016 | I'll Sleep When I'm Dead | Himself | Documentary |
| 2018 | Florida to California | Himself | Documentary |
| 2019 | Detective Pikachu | Himself | |
| 2020 | The High Note | Richie Williams | |
| 2024 | K-Pops! | Himself | Cameo |

=== Television ===
| Year | Title | Role | Notes |
|---|---|---|---|
| 2016 | Ridiculousness | Himself | Episode: "Diplo" |
| 2017 | Chelsea | Himself | Episode: "Dinner Party: Ending on a High Note" |
| 2020 | The Price Is Right | Himself/Guest Model | Season 48: Day 4 of Music Week |
| 2023 | The Eric Andre Show | Himself | Episode: "Don't You Say A Word" |
| 2024 | Yo Gabba Gabbaland | Himself | Episode: Grow |

== Awards and nominations ==
List of awards and nominations received by Diplo
| Award | Year | Nominee(s) | Category | Result | Ref. |
|---|---|---|---|---|---|
| Asian Pop Music Awards | 2025 | "Like Jennie" | Best Lyricist | Pending | |
| Camerimage | 2012 | "Express Yourself" | Best Music Video | Nominated | |
| Camerimage | 2013 | "Earthquake" | Best Music Video | Nominated | |
| Clio Awards | 2026 | Diplo's Run Club | Experience/Activation - Events | Bronze | |
| GAFFA-Prisen Awards | 2019 | Diplo | Best International Artist | Won | |
| GAFFA-Prisen Awards | 2019 | California | Best International Album | Nominated | |
| Grammy Awards | 2009 | "Paper Planes" | Record of the Year | Nominated | |
| Grammy Awards | 2012 | "Look at Me Now" | Best Rap Song | Nominated | |
| Grammy Awards | 2013 | Diplo | Producer of the Year, Non-Classical | Nominated | |
| Grammy Awards | 2016 | Diplo | Producer of the Year, Non-Classical | Nominated | |
| Grammy Awards | 2016 | "Where Are Ü Now" (with Skrillex and Justin Bieber) | Best Dance Recording | Won | |
| Grammy Awards | 2016 | Skrillex and Diplo Present Jack Ü (with Skrillex) | Best Dance/Electronic Album | Won | |
| Grammy Awards | 2017 | Lemonade (as a producer) | Album of the Year | Nominated | |
| Grammy Awards | 2017 | Purpose (as a producer) | Album of the Year | Nominated | |
| Grammy Awards | 2019 | "Electricity" (with Mark Ronson and Dua Lipa) | Best Dance Recording | Won | |
| Grammy Awards | 2023 | "Don't Forget My Love" (with Miguel) | Best Dance/Electronic Recording | Nominated | |
| Grammy Awards | 2023 | Diplo | Best Dance/Electronic Album | Nominated | |
| Electronic Music Awards | 2017 | Diplo & Friends | Radio Show of the Year | Won | |
| Electronic Music Awards | 2017 | Diplo | DJ of the Year | Nominated | |
| Electronic Dance Music Awards | 2016 | "Bitch Better Have My Money" (with Grandtheft and Rihanna) | Best Rise & Drop | Won | |
| Electronic Dance Music Awards | 2022 | Diplo | Club DJ of The Year | Nominated | |
| Electronic Dance Music Awards | 2022 | "Turn Back Time" (with Sonny Fodera) | UK House Song of The Year | Nominated | |
| Electronic Dance Music Awards | 2022 | "Don't Forget My Love" (with Miguel) | Dance/Electro Pop Song of The Year | Nominated | |
| Electronic Dance Music Awards | 2022 | "Don't Forget My Love" (with Miguel) | House Song of The Year | Nominated | |
| Electronic Dance Music Awards | 2022 | "Don't Forget My Love" (with Miguel) | Dance Song of The Year (Radio) | Nominated | |
| Electronic Dance Music Awards | 2022 | Diplo | Male Artist of the Year | Won | |
| Electronic Dance Music Awards | 2023 | Diplo | Male Artist of the Year | Nominated | |
| Electronic Dance Music Awards | 2023 | Diplo | Producer of the Year | Nominated | |
| Electronic Dance Music Awards | 2023 | Diplo | Club DJ of The Year | Nominated | |
| Electronic Dance Music Awards | 2024 | "Stay High" (with Hugel and Julia Church) | Remake of the Year | Nominated | |
| Electronic Dance Music Awards | 2024 | Diplo | Club DJ of The Year | Nominated | |
| Electronic Dance Music Awards | 2025 | "Stay High" (with Hugel and Julia Church) | Remake of the Year | Nominated | |
| Electronic Dance Music Awards | 2025 | "Stay High" (with Hugel and Julia Church) | Best Collaboration | Won | |
| Electronic Dance Music Awards | 2025 | "Your Love" by The Outfield (Diplo Remix) | Remix Rewind | Nominated | |
| Electronic Dance Music Awards | 2025 | Diplo | Club DJ of the Year | Nominated | |
| Electronic Dance Music Awards | 2025 | "Heaven or Not" (with Riva Starr featuring Kareen Lomax) | Dance / Electro Pop Song of the Year | Nominated | |
| International Dance Music Awards | 2011 | "C'mon" | Best Electro/Tech House Track | Nominated | |
| International Dance Music Awards | 2011 | "C'mon" | Best Trance Track | Nominated | |
| International Dance Music Awards | 2011 | Diplo | Best Remixer | Nominated | |
| International Dance Music Awards | 2013 | Diplo | Best North American DJ | Nominated | |
| International Dance Music Awards | 2013 | Diplo | Best Producer | Nominated | |
| International Dance Music Awards | 2014 | Diplo | Best Producer | Nominated | |
| International Dance Music Awards | 2014 | Diplo | Best North American DJ | Nominated | |
| International Dance Music Awards | 2015 | Diplo | Best North American DJ | Nominated | |
| International Dance Music Awards | 2015 | Diplo | Best Producer | Nominated | |
| International Dance Music Awards | 2015 | Diplo | Best Dubstep/Drum & Bass DJ | Nominated | |
| International Dance Music Awards | 2015 | "Dirty Vibe" (with Skrillex, G-Dragon and CL) | Best Dubstep/Drum & Bass Track | Nominated | |
| International Dance Music Awards | 2015 | Diplo and Friends | Best Podcast or Radio Mixshow | Nominated | |
| International Dance Music Awards | 2016 | Diplo and Friends | Best Podcast or Radio Mixshow | Nominated | |
| International Dance Music Awards | 2016 | Diplo | Best Producer | Nominated | |
| International Dance Music Awards | 2016 | Diplo | Best Global DJ | Nominated | |
| International Dance Music Awards | 2016 | Diplo | Best North American DJ | Nominated | |
| International Dance Music Awards | 2016 | Diplo | Best EDM/Pop DJ | Nominated | |
| iHeartRadio Music Awards | 2021 | Diplo Presents Thomas Wesley, Chapter 1: Snake Oil | Dance Album of the Year | Won | |
| PLUG Awards | 2005 | Himself | New Artist of the Year | Nominated | |
| PLUG Awards | 2005 | Favela On Blast | DJ Album of the Year | Nominated | |
| PLUG Awards | 2006 | FabricLive.24 | DJ Album of the Year | Nominated | |
| PLUG Awards | 2006 | Himself | Record Producer of the Year | Nominated | |
| PLUG Awards | 2007 | FabricLive.24 | DJ Album of the Year | Nominated | |
| Playing For Change Foundation | 2024 | Diplo | Impact Award | Won | |
| UK Music Video Awards | 2013 | "Earthquake" | Best Styling in a Video | Won | |

=== Listicles ===
Diplo on select listicles
| Publisher | Year | Listicle | Placement | Ref. |
|---|---|---|---|---|
| DJ Magazine | 2013 | Top 100 DJs | 64th | |
| DJ Magazine | 2014 | Top 100 DJs | 32nd | |
| DJ Magazine | 2015 | Top 100 DJs | 20th | |
| DJ Magazine | 2016 | Top 100 DJs | 23rd | |
| DJ Magazine | 2017 | Top 100 DJs | 25th | |
| DJ Magazine | 2018 | Top 100 DJs | 42nd | |
| DJ Magazine | 2019 | Top 100 DJs | 67th | |
