= Arular Tour =

2005–06 concert tour by M.I.A.

- Tour by M.I.A.
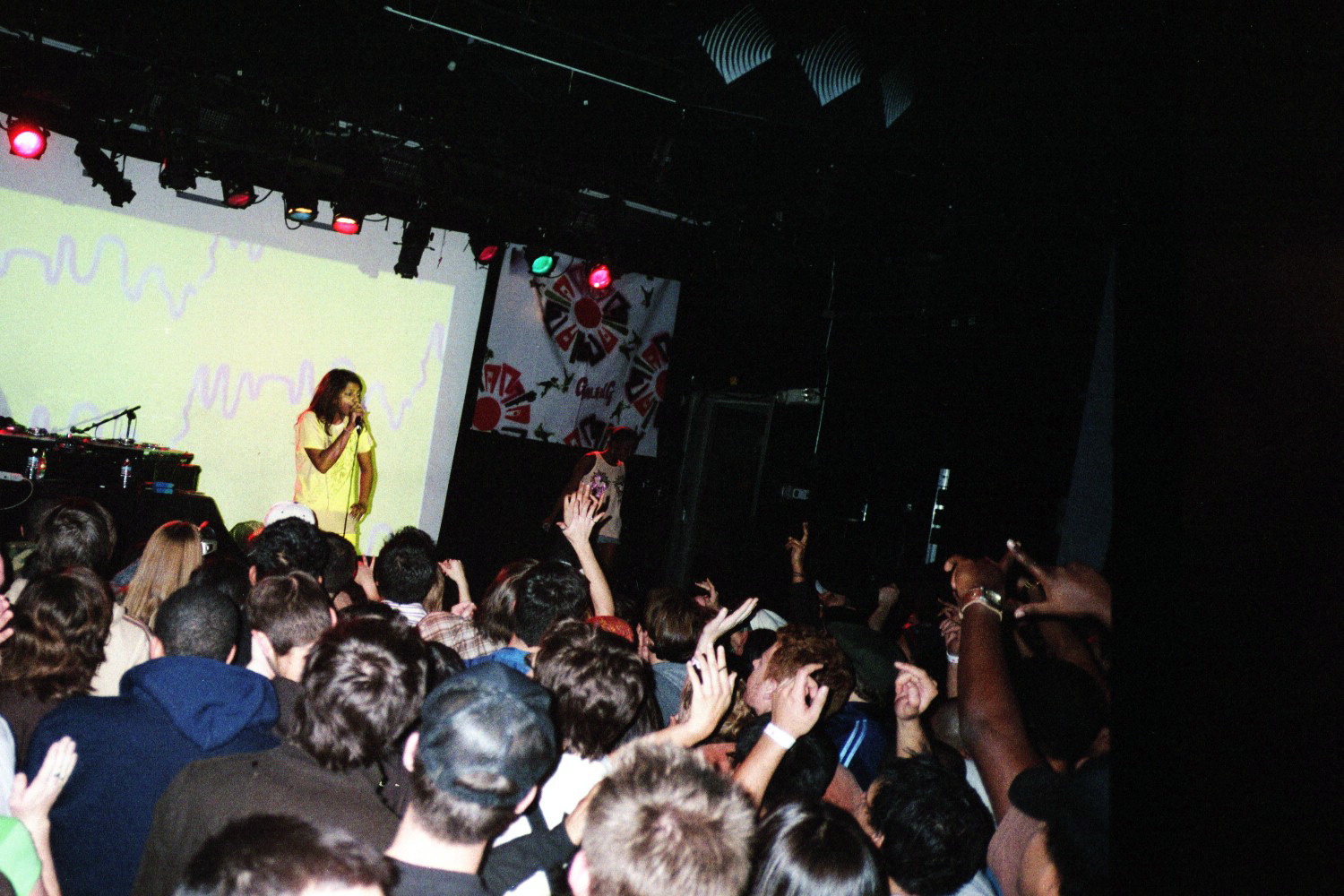
- M.I.A. performing in Los Angeles, USA 2005
- Associated album: Arular
- Start date: 2 February 2005
- End date: 5 February 2006
- Legs: 9
- No. of shows: 41 in North America; 12 in Europe; 6 in Oceania; 3 in South America; 2 in Asia; 64 total

M.I.A. concert chronology
- Arular Tour (2005); Kala Tour (2007)

The Arular Tour is a global concert tour by M.I.A. performed in support of her first studio album Arular (2005). It took place from 2005 to 2006.

The tour featured dates across North America, South America, Canada, Europe, Asia and Australasia. M.I.A. performed sporadically near the end of 2004. One of M.I.A.'s first live performances in London took place in November 2004. She also performed at an event in Puerto Rico and minor gigs in places such as Philadelphia and New York City in the U.S., as well as Hamburg and Berlin in Germany in 2004. Her 2005 tour began with her North American debut performance at the Drake Hotel in Toronto, Ontario on 2 February 2005.

== Tour details ==
The Arular Tour setlist featured songs from her debut album Arular. Some mixes from her mixtape Piracy Funds Terrorism were also performed. M.I.A. did not follow the same setlist at every show. M.I.A. spoke in 2005 of wanting to make her live set "minimal," inspired by gigs of acts such as electroclash musician Peaches which she attended whilst travelling and filming a documentary on her. M.I.A.'s concert following the Drake Hotel gig received a response described as "phenomenal" by organiser Jacob Smid, with attendees already knowing many of her songs.

Sets were sometimes decorated with palm fronds. The stage featured coloured drapes, canvasses and flags she created with prints of her graffiti stencils, paintings, and her album and singles artwork. These featured pictures of anonymous rebel soldiers, tigers, tanks and guns amid jagged colourful patterns. Her stage attire featured similar prints. She wore many contrasting outfits, nearly every item of clothing hand made by friends such as Carri Mundane and herself. In some shows, a video screen displayed images of tigers, looping fighter jets, maps of London and oil rigs.

=== Coachella 2005 ===
M.I.A ended her set in the Gobi tent at the 2005 Coachella Valley Music and Arts Festival with the song "Galang", leading to an encore in response to crowd enthusiasm, a rarity for the festival and the first tent encore at Coachella. Describing the performance she said, "When I played three years ago, it was such a crazy moment. It was my first festival and I had only done about five shows in my entire life...They dismantled the stage and had to put it back together because all the people started going, 'M.I.A! M.I.A!' I don't think I'd ever be able to do something like that again, because it was my moment."

=== Later tour ===
Additionally, M.I.A. co-headlined tours with Roots Manuva and LCD Soundsystem during 2005. Her dates from 10 May at the Commodore Ballroom, Canada to 12 June at the 9:30 Club, US were performed with LCD Soundsystem. M.I.A. performed with backup singer Cherry and DJ Diplo on many dates. Spank Rock opened for M.I.A. on a few dates, as did DJ's Rekha, Marlboro and Contra who made appearances on some dates during the tour. Concerts took place at club venues and music festivals. She joined Gwen Stefani on her 2005 tour and ended the Arular tour with performances in Japan in February 2006. M.I.A. performed several sold-out shows during her tour, with Aziz Ansari, Feist, David Byrne, Nas, Kelis, Matt Damon and Natalie Portman among those attending concerts. Recording for her second album Kala followed this tour, which preceded the 2007 KALA Tour.

== Set list ==
This is the set-list from M.I.A.'s sold-out concert at the club S.O.B.s in Manhattan U.S..

- "Pull Up the People"
- "Fire Fire"
- "Sunshowers"
- "Hombre"
- "M.I.A."
- "Amazon"
- "10 Dollar"
- "Bucky Done Gun"
- "Galang"
- "U.R.A.Q.T."
- "Bingo"

== Tour dates ==
Date	City	Country	Venue
North America
2 February 2005	Toronto	Canada	Drake Hotel
3 February 2005	Los Angeles	United States	Knitting Factory
5 February 2005	New York City	United States	Knitting Factory
1 May 2005 (Note: This concert is part of Coachella.)	Indio	United States	Empire Polo Club
10 May 2005	Vancouver	Canada	Commodore Ballroom
11 May 2005	Seattle	United States	The Showbox
13 May 2005	San Francisco	United States	The Independent
14 May 2005	San Francisco	United States	The Fillmore
15 May 2005	Los Angeles	United States	El Rey Theatre
17 May 2005	Los Angeles	United States	The Echo
19 May 2005	Chicago	United States	Metro Chicago
20 May 2005	Detroit	United States	Saint Andrew's Hall
21 May 2005	Toronto	Canada	The Opera House
22 May 2005	Montreal	Canada	La Tulipe
7 June 2005	New York City	United States	SOB's
9 June 2005	Boston	United States	Avalon Ballroom
10 June 2005	New York City	United States	Webster Hall
11 June 2005	Philadelphia	United States	Transit
12 June 2005	Washington, D.C.	United States	9:30 Club
Europe
16 June 2005 (Note: This concert is part of Hultsfred Festival.)	Hultsfred	Sweden	Hultsfred Folkets Park
17 June 2005	London	England	Fabric
18 June 2005 (Note: This concert is part of Sónar.)	Barcelona	Spain	Fira Gran Via
23 June 2005	Norwich	England	The Waterfront
24 June 2005 (Note: This concert is part of Glastonbury Festival.)	Pilton	England	Worthy Farm
25 June 2005 (Note: This concert is part of Wireless Festival.)	London	England	Hyde Park
5 July 2005 (Note: This concert is part of Quart Festival.)	Kristiansand	Norway	Odderøya
14 July 2005	Brussels	Belgium	Ancienne Belgique
15 July 2005 (Note: This concert is part of Ten Days Off.)	Ghent	Belgium	Vooruit
16 July 2005 (Note: This concert is part of 5 Days Off.)	Amsterdam	Netherlands	Melkweg
North America
7 August 2005 (Note: This concert is part of SummerStage.)	New York City	United States	Rumsey Playfield
Asia
13 August 2005 (Note: These concerts are part of Summer Sonic Festival.)	Chiba	Japan	Makuhari Messe
14 August 2005	Osaka	Japan	Intex Osaka
Europe
26 August 2005 (Note: This concert is part of Leeds Festival.)	Leeds	England	Bramham Park
28 August 2005 (Note: This concert is part of Reading Festival.)	Reading	England	Little John's Farm
North America
19 September 2005	Athens	United States	40 Watt Club
21 September 2005	Washington, D.C.	United States	9:30 Club
23 September 2005	Boston	United States	Paradise Rock Club
24 September 2005	Montreal	Canada	Metropolis
26 September 2005	Toronto	Canada	Phoenix Concert Theatre
27 September 2005	Detroit	United States	Saint Andrew's Hall
28 September 2005	Chicago	United States	Metro Chicago
29 September 2005	Minneapolis	United States	Fine Line Music Cafe
1 October 2005	Englewood	United States	Gothic Theatre
4 October 2005	Los Angeles	United States	The Fonda Theatre
5 October 2005	San Francisco	United States	The Regency Ballroom
South America
22 October 2005 (Note: These concerts are part of TIM Festival.)	Rio de Janeiro	Brazil	Museum of Modern Art
25 October 2005	São Paulo	Brazil	Arena Anhembi
29 October 2005 (Note: This concert is part of BUE Festival.)	Buenos Aires	Argentina	Club Ciudad de Buenos Aires
North America (Note: These concerts are supporting to Gwen Stefani's Harajuku Lovers Tour.)
16 November 2005	Winnipeg	Canada	MTS Centre
18 November 2005	Edmonton	Canada	Rexall Place
20 November 2005	Vancouver	Canada	General Motors Place
21 November 2005	Seattle	United States	KeyArena
23 November 2005	Portland	United States	Veterans Memorial Coliseum
25 November 2005	Fresno	United States	Save Mart Center
26 November 2005	Anaheim	United States	Arrowhead Pond
28 November 2005	Anaheim	United States	Arrowhead Pond
29 November 2005	Bakersfield	United States	Rabobank Arena
1 December 2005	Oakland	United States	The Arena in Oakland
Oceania
22 January 2006 (Note: These concerts are part of Big Day Out.)	Gold Coast	Australia	Gold Coast Parklands
26 January 2006	Sydney	Australia	Sydney Showground Stadium
28 January 2006	Sydney	Australia	Metro Theatre
29 January 2006	Melbourne	Australia	Princes Park
3 February 2006	Adelaide	Australia	Adelaide Showground
5 February 2006	Perth	Australia	Claremont Showground
