= Piracy Funds Terrorism =

Piracy Funds Terrorism Volume 1

Mixtape by M.I.A. and Diplo
- Released: December 2004
- Recorded: Late 2004
- Length: 57:08
- Label: Self-released
- Producers: Diplo, M.I.A.

M.I.A. chronology
Piracy Funds Terrorism Volume 1 (2004)	Arular (2005)

Diplo chronology
Florida (2004)	Piracy Funds Terrorism Volume 1 (2004)	FabricLive.24 (2005)

Piracy Funds Terrorism Volume 1, usually referred to simply as Piracy Funds Terrorism, is a mixtape produced by English recording artist M.I.A. and American DJ Diplo featuring vocal tracks intended for M.I.A.'s debut album Arular mashed up with samples of other recordings. The mixtape was produced by the two artists at Diplo's home studio in Philadelphia, Pennsylvania. It was not officially released, but was distributed at M.I.A.'s live shows and via the internet to promote the release of her much-delayed debut album. Despite its unofficial status, the mixtape received general acclaim among critics. Several music publications included the mixtape in their listings of the best albums of 2004.

== Recording ==
Recording sessions for Arular, the debut album by M.I.A., took place during 2003 and 2004, and the album was originally scheduled to be released in September 2004. Legal issues relating to the use of samples delayed this release, however, first to December and then into 2005. During the recording process, M.I.A. met DJ Diplo, and expressed an interest in working with him on a track for the album. Although their initial recording sessions together proved fruitless, Diplo conceived the idea of using the existing vocal tracks recorded for the album to produce a mixtape which could be used to promote the delayed full-length album. M.I.A. extended her stay in the United States and the two artists produced the mixtape at his home studio.

== Music and artwork ==
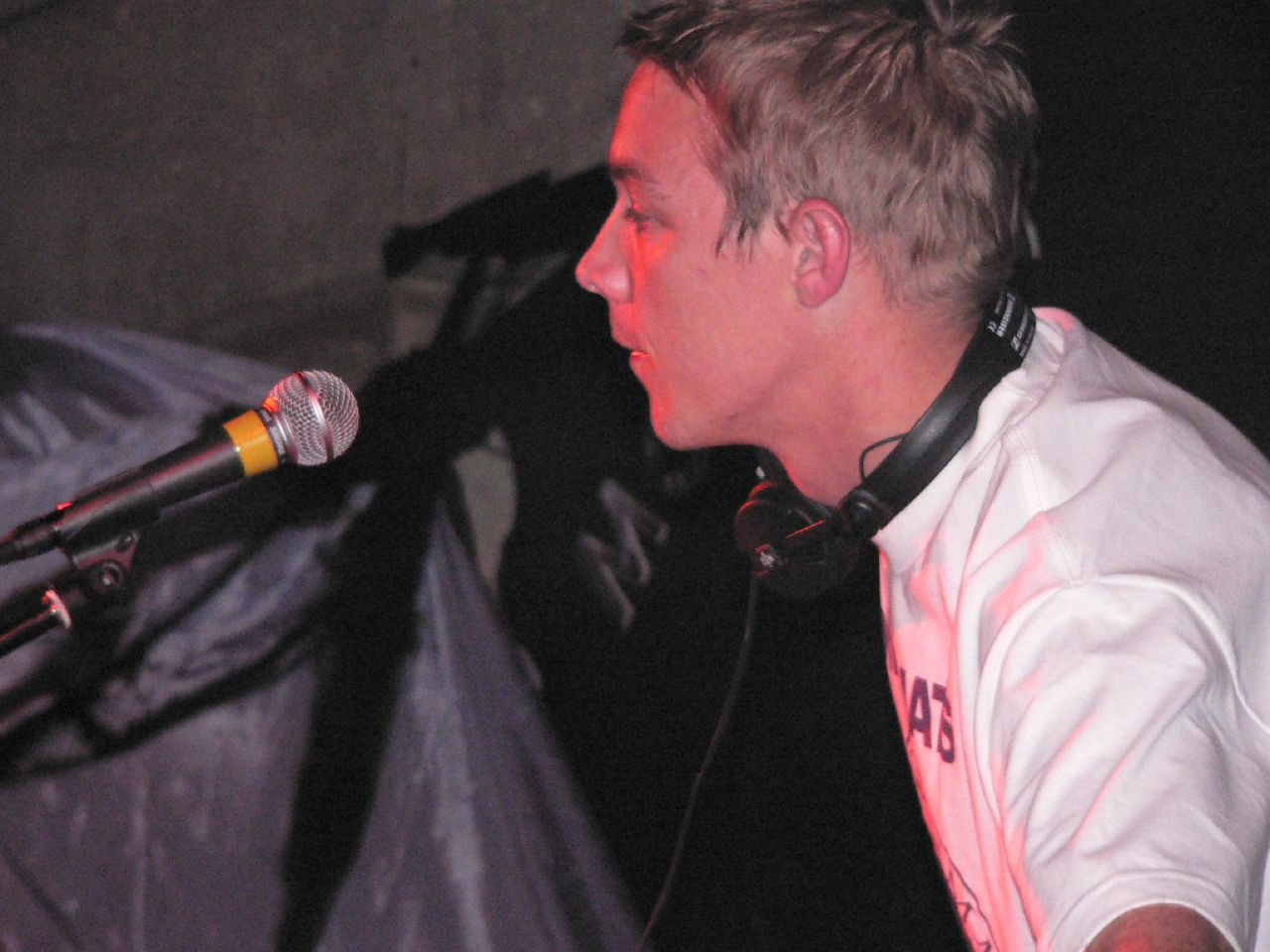
Diplo, who mixed the recording

The mixtape includes early mixes of the vocals intended for Arular, mashed up with samples of tracks including "Walk Like an Egyptian" by The Bangles, "Big Pimpin'" by Jay-Z and "Push It" by Salt-N-Pepa. Tunes by Baby, dead Prez, Missy Elliott, Ciara, LL Cool J and Cutty Ranks are also included. Necessary legal clearance for the use of these samples was not obtained, with the result that the mixtape could not be sold in record shops and could only be distributed by word of mouth. In addition to pop and hip hop, global music styles are included in the mix. The track "Galang" incorporates elements of reggaeton, and three tracks consist of Brazilian baile funk.

The cover features a photograph of M.I.A. wearing a T-shirt with the slogan "Complaints Department" placed above a picture of a hand grenade. Arranged around the title are a series of smaller pictures depicting dancers, rioters and riot police. According to Diplo, the pressing was handled by a "little storefront-house" which specialises in producing mixtapes.

== Release and reception ==
Professional ratings
Review scores
Source	Rating
Pitchfork	8.5/10
Stylus Magazine	B+
The Village Voice	A−

An initial pressing of 1,000 copies of the mixtape was produced and given to M.I.A.'s record label. The label began sending the copies out as promotional recordings, prompting Diplo to ask for the remaining copies to be returned so that he could distribute them at shows and in clubs, which he felt was a more appropriate method of distribution for the mixtape. He stated that around 2,000 copies of the recording were produced in total.

The mixtape received general acclaim among music critics, despite not being an official release. In a review for The Village Voice, Robert Christgau said he was more interested in hearing M.I.A.'s own original music than a mashup: "I find more fascination—and pleasure, if not variety—in M.I.A. juxtaposed against herself than in, for instance, favela funk juxtaposed against 'Walk Like an Egyptian'. Which isn't to deny I also find all these good things in favela funk juxtaposed against 'Walk Like an Egyptian'." Rollie Pemberton from Stylus Magazine called Piracy Funds Terrorism "a genre-bending adventure in shattered preconceptions and club killing beats" and said that, based on the strength of the mixtape, M.I.A.'s first official album had a lot to live up to. Village Voice critic Tom Breihan later expressed relief that M.I.A.'s aesthetic and her debut album did not have much input from Diplo.

Piracy Funds Terrorism was voted the 23rd best album of 2004 in the Pazz & Jop, an annual poll of American critics nationwide, published by The Village Voice. Pitchfork ranked it at number 12 on their year-end albums list, and later at number 103 on their decade-end list of top 200 albums from the 2000s.

== Track listing ==
The first pressing of Piracy Funds Terrorism had an incorrect track listing, which was fixed for the second pressing, the track listing for which is as follows:

No.	Title	Samples	Length
1.	"Galangaton" (Diplo Mix)		2:02
2.	"Galang" (featuring Lil Vicious)	"What Happened to That Boy" by Birdman featuring Clipse, "The Glock" by Vicious	2:57
3.	"Two Bit Rhythm" (M.I.A. Mix; LL Cool J/Cavemen)		2:39
4.	"Fire Bam" (Diplo Mix)	"Murder She Wrote" by Chaka Demus & Pliers	2:40
5.	"Fire Fire"	"Walk Like an Egyptian" by The Bangles	3:33
6.	"One for the Head Skit" (M.I.A/Missy)	"Pass That Dutch" by Missy Elliott	1:37
7.	"Amazon" (Diplo Mix)	"Goodies" by Ciara	3:32
8.	"Definition of a Roller" (The Clipse)		3:14
9.	"Untitled" (M.I.A./Cutty Ranks)	"Drop It Like It's Hot" by Snoop Dogg ft. Pharrell	3:23
10.	"MIA"	"Hip-Hop" by Dead Prez	3:10
11.	"You're Good" (Diplo Mix)		3:04
12.	"Pop"		2:35
13.	"Sunshowers" (Diplo Mix)	"Push It" by Salt-N-Pepa	3:00
14.	"Baile Funk One"	"Papa Don't Preach" by Madonna, "Aviãozinho" by Sandy & as Travessas	2:15
15.	"Bucky Done Gun"		2:45
16.	"Baile Funk Two"	"When Doves Cry" by Prince	1:44
17.	"China Girl" (Diplo Mix)	"10 Dollar", "Sweet Dreams (Are Made of This)" by Eurythmics, "Bucky Done Gun"	2:08
18.	"Baile Funk Three"		1:24
19.	"Lady Killer" (Diplo Mix)	"Tour de France" by Kraftwerk	3:22
20.	"URAQT" (Diplo Mix)	"Sanford and Son Theme (The Streetbeater)" by Quincy Jones	2:45
21.	"Bingo" (Diplo Mix)	"Big Pimpin'" by Jay-Z featuring UGK	3:19

For the third pressing, two tracks featuring beats created by Cavemen were replaced with new material due to legal issues.

== Personnel ==
The only credits on the cover are as follows:

- Hollertronix/Wes Gully (Diplo) – executive production
- Maya Arul (M.I.A.) – "executive mish mash"
- Knox Robinson – worldwide A&R
