= FabricLive.49 =

Compilation album by Buraka Som Sistema
- Released: 7 December 2009
- Genre: Kuduro, grime
- Label: Fabric Records
- Producer: Buraka Som Sistema

Buraka Som Sistema chronology
Black Diamond (2008)	FabricLive.49 (2009)

FabricLive chronology
FabricLive.48 (2009)	FabricLive.49 (2009)	FabricLive.50 (2009)

Professional ratings
Review scores
Source	Rating
AllMusic	3.5/5 stars

FabricLive.49 is a 2009 album by Buraka Som Sistema. The album was released as part of the FabricLive Mix Series.

== Track listing ==
1. Dre Skull ft. Sizzla - Gone Too Far (Buraka Som Sistema Remix) - Mixpak Records
2. Buraka Som Sistema - General (Stenchman Mix) - fabric
3. Buraka Som Sistema - General (L-VIS 1990 Mix) - fabric
4. Ku Bo ft. Anbuley - Tsu Bo - Man
5. DJ Znobia - Pausa - Enchufada
6. Buraka Som Sistema - Kurum (Roulet Mix) - fabric
7. Seductive - Underground Sound - Döner Digital Records/Maniax Music
8. Diplo & Laidback Luke - Hey - Southern Fried
9. Buraka Som Sistema - IC19 (A1 Bassline Attack Mix) - fabric
10. L-VIS 1990 - United Groove (Buraka Som Sistema Remix) - Mad Decent
11. Skream - Fick - Tempa
12. DJ Riot - Mermaid Dub - Faster Music
13. Zomby - Dynamite Sandwich - Unreleased
14. Crime Mob ft. Lil Scrappy - Rock Yo Hips - WEA
15. DJ Znobia - Danca Da Mae Ju (Buraka Som Sistema Edit) - Enchufada
16. Batida - Bazuka (Quem Me Rusgou?) - Difference
17. Yolanda Be Cool - Afro Nuts (Douster Remix) - Sweat It Out!
18. Solo - Joga Bola - DeadFish
19. Buraka Som Sistema ft. Deize Tigrona - Aqui Para Voces (Buratronic Mix) - fabric
20. Djedjotronic - Gum Attack - Boysnoize
21. 2 Tracks Mixed:
  1. Harvard Bass - Caked - Institubes
  2. Buraka Som Sistema ft. Pongolove - Kalemba (Wegue Wegue) (Acapella) - fabric
22. Mastiksoul - Run For Cover (Dub Mix) - Vidisco
23. Nova Lima - Machete - Mr Bongo
24. DJ Malvado - Puto Mekie - Unreleased
25. Buraka Som Sistema - Luanda-Lisboa (Nic Sarno Mix) - fabric
26. SonicC - Stickin - MixMash
27. Major Lazer - Bruk Out (Buraka Som Sistema Mix) - Universal
28. Buraka Som Sistema ft. Bruno M - Tiroza (Bert on Beats Remix) - fabric
