= Black Diamond (Buraka Som Sistema album) =

Studio album by Buraka Som Sistema
- Released: 2008
- Genre: Electro; kuduro; breakbeat
- Length: 52:10
- Label: Fabric / Sony BMG

Buraka Som Sistema chronology
From Buraka to the World (2006)	Black Diamond (2008)	FabricLive.49 (2009)

Professional ratings
Review scores
Source	Rating
Allmusic	link
Pitchfork Media	(7.9/10) link
No Ripcord	link
sputnikmusic	link

Black Diamond is Buraka Som Sistema's second album which was released in 2008. It was released in the United States on April 7, 2009.

== Track listing ==
1. "Luanda - Lisboa" (feat. DJ Znobia) - 4:21
2. "Sound of Kuduro" (featuring DJ Znobia, M.I.A., Saborosa and Puto Prata) - 3:33
3. "Aqui para vocês" (feat. Deize Tigrona) - 4:12
4. "Kalemba (Wegue Wegue)" (feat. Pongolove) - 3:53
5. "Kurum" - 5:44
6. "IC19" - 4:20
7. "Tiroza" (feat. Bruno M) - 4:49
8. "General" - 4:04
9. "Yah!" (feat. Petty) - 3:33
10. "Skank & Move" (feat. Kano) - 3:57
11. "D.. D.. D.. D.. Jay" (feat. Petty) - 3:46
12. "New Africas Pt.1" - 1:52
13. "New Africas Pt.2" - 3:55

== Chart positions ==
Chart (2009)	Peak position
Belgian Albums (Ultratop Flanders)	54
Belgian Alternative Albums (Ultratop Flanders)	26
Portuguese Albums (AFP)	7
World Albums (Billboard)	8
