= Drop the Lime =

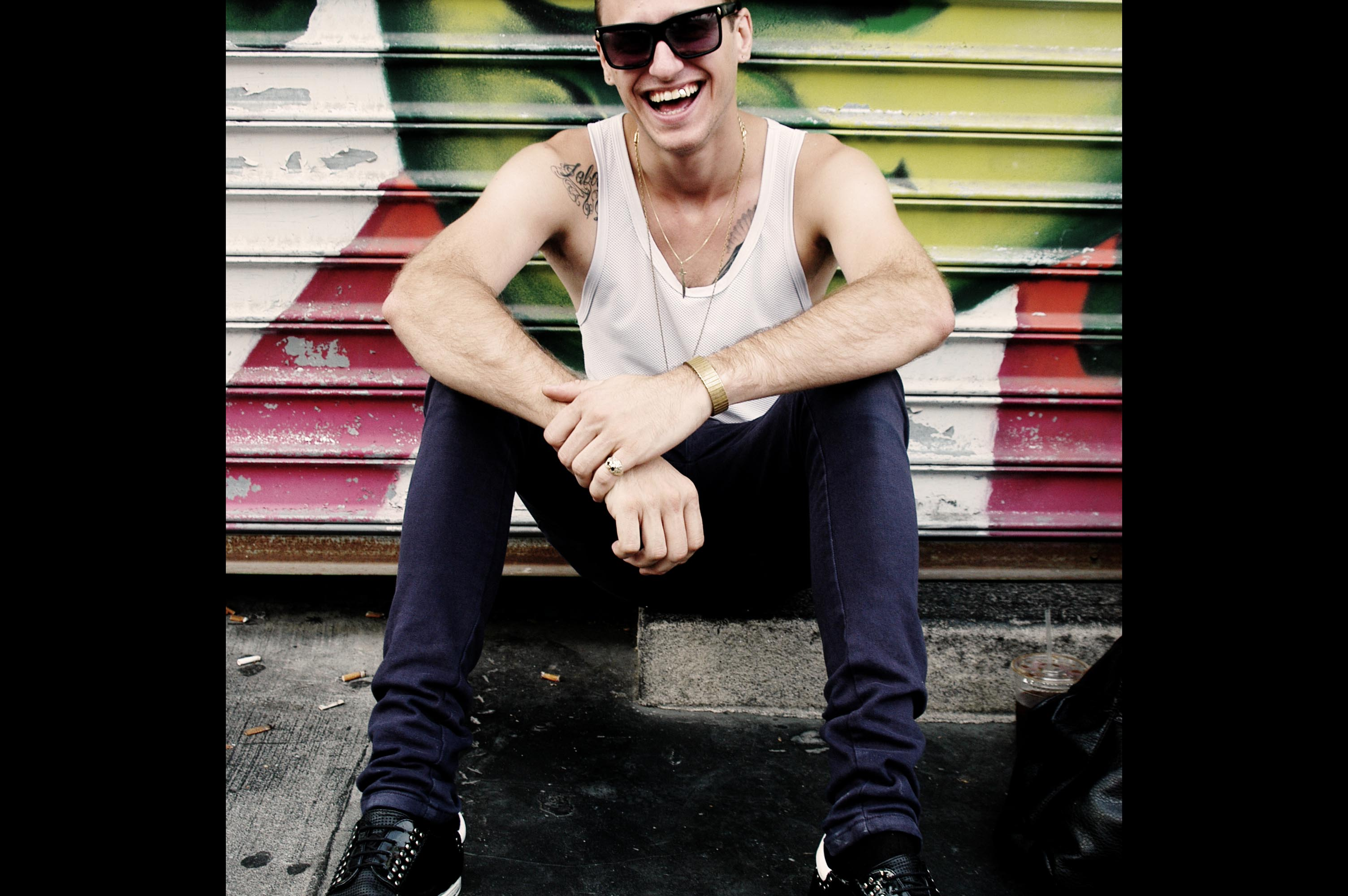

Background information
- Birth name: Luca Venezia
- Born: New York City, New York
- Genres: Electronic music
- Occupations: Record producer; DJ
- Years active: 2004 - 2015

Drop the Lime (born Luca Venezia in New York City) is an electronic producer and DJ and founder of dance label Trouble & Bass. Drop the Lime's new material and DJ sets also feature live vocals on original compositions.

With roots in breakcore music, in 2008 he changed his focus to more mainstream dance music, remixing tracks for Armand Van Helden, Little Boots, Robyn, Moby, Rex the Dog, Dan le Sac vs Scroobius Pip and Buraka Som Sistema as well as indie acts such as Surfer Blood, Creep and O. Children

Over the years, Venezia has created his own distinct twist on the Trouble & Bass sound and now combines his love of Rockabilly with his own take on bass-driven music. In 2015, Drop The Lime finished, and Venezia pursued other musical projects.

== Musical style ==
Vivian Host describes Venezia's sound as comprising "chopped-up breaks making hairpin turns, breakdowns coming out of nowhere, a foundation of wobbling goblin bass often cut in with tropical, clacking snares", with "enigmatic lyrics in his singularly scratchy, bluesy notes."

== Influences ==
Venezia has taken inspiration from doo-wop, northern soul, crunk, dancehall, house, ghettotech, electro house, minimal techno, grime, Baltimore club, freestyle, new rave, dubstep, fidget house and electro.

== Discography ==
- I'm The Bully, mp3 (Binkcrsh)
- Surrender To The Sound, 12" (2003, Mutant Sniper Adventure)
- Sweet Desire, 12" (2003, Ambush)
- 1 For The Team, 12" (2004, Broklyn Beats)
- Gal Yu Nuh Beg, 12" (2004, Shockout)
- I Survived The Blackout, 7" (2004, 333 Recordings)
- Killy 123 EP, 12", (2004, Tigerbeat6)
- Tribute To Tiger, 12" (2005, Shockout)
- Step It Up, 12" EP (2005, Mirex)
- This Means Forever, LP (2005, Very Friendly/Tigerbeat6)
- Shotgun Wedding Volume 4, DJ Mix - Grime, Dubstep & 4x4. (2006, Violent Turd/Tigerbeat6)
- Shot Shot Hearts, EP (2006, Tigerbeat6)
- We Never Sleep, LP (2006, Tigerbeat6)
- Trouble & Bass TB001 White Label split w/ Math Head, EP (2006, Trouble & Bass/Adaadat)
- Bad Girlz, EP (2006, Rag & Bone)
- Bass Bandits, EP (2006, Flamin Hotz)
- Sky City Rising, EP (2007, Broklyn Beats)
- The Final Crackdown, EP (2007, Tiger Bass)
- Come 2 Life, Appears on Turbo Charged EP (2007, Trouble & Bass Recordings)
- Like Thunder, EP (2008, Trouble & Bass)
- Devil's Eyes, mp3 (2009, BACARDI B-LIVE)
- Sex Sax, mp3 (2010, Trouble & Bass)
- FabricLive.53, CD (2010, fabric)
- Enter the Night, CD (2012, Ultra Records)
- Enter The Nite Versions, CD (2012, Ultra Records)
- The Last Defender, cassette (2015, Dream Catalogue) (as Luca Venezia)
