= Enchufada =

Portuguese independent record label

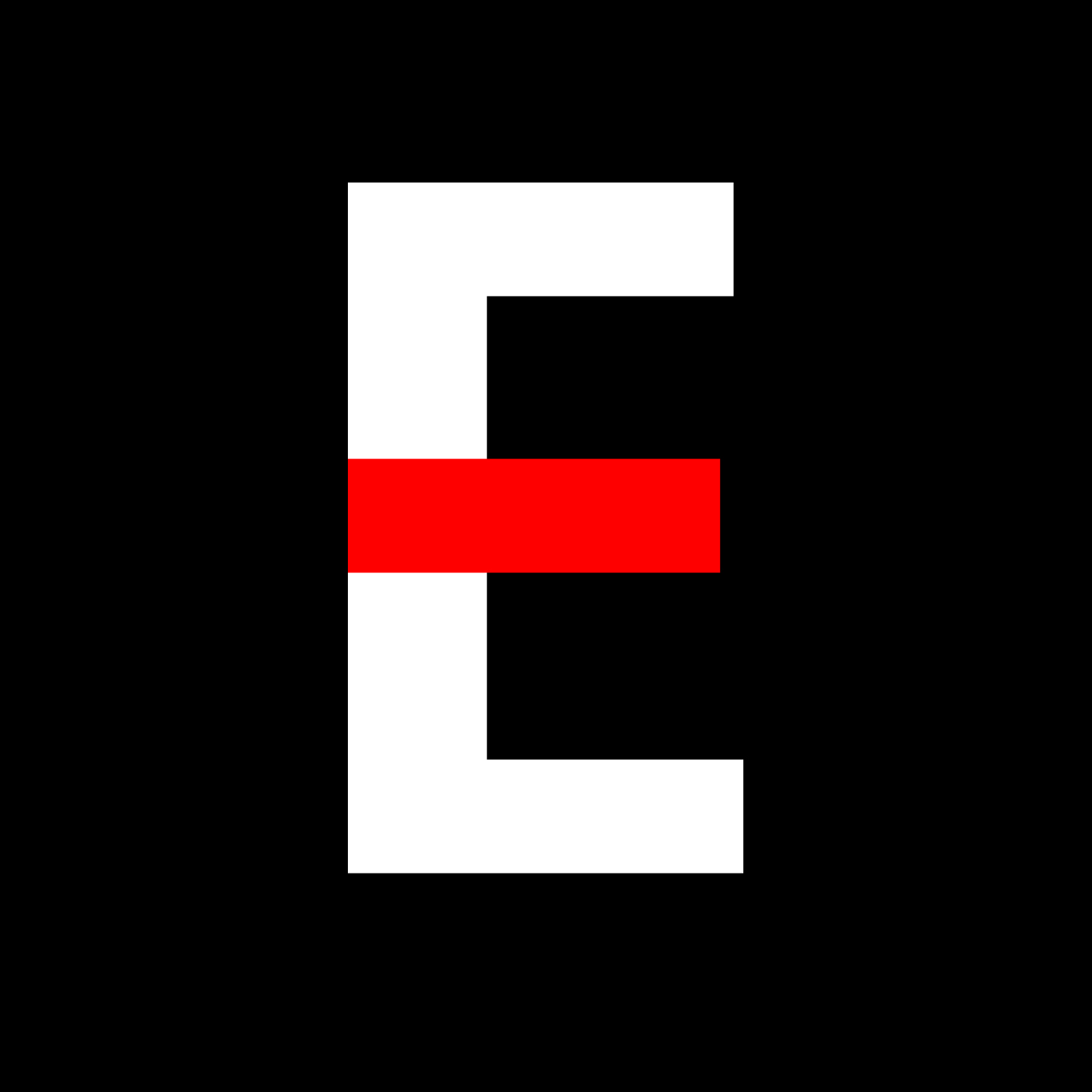
- Founded: 2006; 20 years ago
- Founder: Branko (João Barbosa); Kalaf Ângelo
- Genre: Electronic music, kuduro
- Country of origin: Portugal
- Location: Lisbon, Portugal
- Official website: enchufada.com

Enchufada is a Portuguese independent record label based in Lisbon. Founded in 2006 by Buraka Som Sistema band members Branko (João Barbosa) and Kalaf Ângelo, the label originally served as a creative platform for their early musical experiments, which fused Angolan kuduro with European electronic music genres. This aesthetic defined the early years of the imprint and set the stylistic tone for its future releases.

Embracing global club music - an umbrella term for modern electronic expressions that fuse local musical and rhythmic traditions with contemporary club genres -, Enchufada’s mission has manifested itself in compilation series like Hard Ass Sessions (named after the literal translation of kuduro), which saw international artists offer their interpretations of the Angolan genre, and the Upper Cuts series, featuring music from a diverse range of international producers across the global music spectrum.

Over its nearly two decades of activity, Enchufada has released music from artists such as Buraka Som Sistema, Branko, Dengue Dengue Dengue, Dino d’Santiago, Vanyfox, Mina, Dotorado Pro, T.Williams, PAUS and many more. The label held a residency at NTS Radio, curated stages at festivals such as Sónar Lisboa, and hosted the monthly night “Na Surra”. Its role in spearheading and developing Lisbon’s Afro-Portuguese electronic sound is widely recognized.

== Selected Discography ==
- Branko - Soma (2024)
- Branko - OBG (2022)
- PEDRO - Da Linha (2020)
- Branko - Enchufada na Zona Vol. 2 (2020)
- Dengue Dengue Dengue - Zenith & Nadir (2019)
- Dengue Dengue Dengue - Son de los Diablos (2018)
- Branko - Enchufada na Zona (2017)
- Dengue Dengue Dengue - Siete Raíces (2016)
- V.A. - Enchufada Upper Cuts: Four Years of Global Club Anthems (2016)
- Branko - ATLAS (2015)
- Dotorado Pro - African Scream (2015)
- Alo Wala - Cityboy (2014)
- Buraka Som Sistema - Buraka (2014)
- Branko - Control (2014)
- Dengue Dengue Dengue - Serpiente Dorada (2014)
- V.A. - Hard Ass Sessions Compilation (2012)
- Buraka Som Sistema - Komba (2011)
- Buraka Som Sistema - Black Diamond (2008)
- Buraka Som Sistema - From Buraka To The World (2006)
