= Arular =

Studio album by M.I.A.
- Released: 22 March 2005
- Recorded: Mid-2003 – 2004; West London
- Genres: World; hip hop; dancehall; dance
- Length: 38:47
- Labels: XL; Interscope
- Producers: Paul Byrne; Diplo; KW Griff; Richard X; Switch; Anthony Whiting; Wizard

M.I.A. chronology
Piracy Funds Terrorism Volume 1 (2004)	Arular (2005)	Kala (2007)

Singles from Arular
- 1. "Galang" Released: 2003; 2. "Sunshowers" Released: 5 July 2004; 3. "Bucky Done Gun" Released: 11 July 2005

Arular is the debut studio album by English singer and rapper M.I.A. It was released on 22 March 2005 in the United States, and one month later in the United Kingdom, with a slightly different track listing. In 2004, the album's release was preceded by two singles and the Piracy Funds Terrorism mixtape. M.I.A. wrote or co-wrote all the songs on the album, while collaborators included Justine Frischmann, Switch, Diplo, Richard X, Ant Whiting and Greg "Wizard" Fleming.

The album's title is the political code name used by her father, Arul Pragasam, during his involvement with Sri Lankan Tamil militant groups, and themes of conflict and revolution feature heavily in the lyrics and artwork. Musically, the album incorporates styles that range from hip hop and electroclash to dancehall, baile funk, and punk. M.I.A. created the basic backing tracks using a Roland MC-505 groovebox given to her by long-time friend Frischmann.

Arular was lauded by critics for its blending of styles and integration of political lyrics into dance tunes. It was nominated for the Mercury Prize in 2005 and was included in the 2005 edition of the book 1001 Albums You Must Hear Before You Die. Although it only reached number 98 on the UK Albums Chart and number 190 on the US Billboard 200, several publications named it as one of the best albums of the year. By early 2010, the album had sold 190,000 copies in the US, Arular spawned the singles "Sunshowers", "Bucky Done Gun" and "Galang", which was released twice.

== Recording and production ==
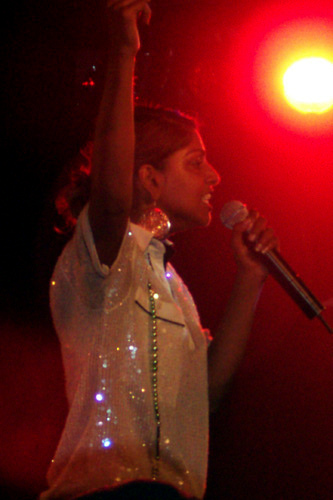
M.I.A. performing in 2006 in Melbourne

In 2001, M.I.A. (Mathangi "Maya" Arulpragasam) had worked exclusively in the visual arts. While filming a documentary on Elastica's 2001 tour of the US, she was introduced to the Roland MC-505 sequencer/drum machine by electroclash artist Peaches, whose minimalistic approach to music inspired her. She found Peaches' decision to perform without additional instrumentation to be brave and liberating and felt that it emphasised the artist. Returning to London, she unexpectedly gained access to a 505 owned by her friend, former Elastica singer Justine Frischmann. M.I.A. used the 505 to make demo recordings in her bedroom. She initially planned to work as a producer. To this end, she approached Caribbean girls in clubs to see if they would provide vocals for the songs, but without success.

"Galang"
21-second sample of M.I.A.'s single "Galang". First released in 2003, with its mix of 505 beats and claps, edgy vocals and lyrics, it marked M.I.A.'s emergence in underground independent music circles worldwide.

M.I.A. secured a record deal with XL Recordings after Frischmann's manager overheard the demo. M.I.A. began work on the album by composing lyrics and melodies, and she programmed drum beats at home on the drum machine. Having produced rough tracks via trial and error, she honed the finished songs in collaboration with other writer-producers. Through these collaborations, she sought to produce a diverse style and "drag [her collaborators] out of their boxes, musically".

DJ Diplo introduced elements of Brazilian baile funk to "Bucky Done Gun". Fellow composer-producer Richard X worked on the track "Hombre", which featured a drum pattern created from the sounds made by toys that M.I.A. had bought in India, augmented with sounds produced by objects such as pens and mobile phones. Steve Mackey and Ross Orton, known professionally as Cavemen, worked on "Galang", which M.I.A. had initially produced with her 505 and a basic four-track tape recorder. Working with Cavemen in a professional studio, she added a bass line and new vocals to give the song "a more analogue sound" than was possible with the 505. The track was co-written by Frischmann, whose input M.I.A. described as "refreshing". She initially hoped to feature guest vocalists on the album, but was unable due to budget constraints and other artists' unfamiliarity with her work. She chose to perform all the vocals herself, saying, "I just quietly got on with it ... I didn't wanna convince anyone it was good. I felt it was much better to prove that I could be an individual."

== Music and lyrics ==
A world, hip hop, dancehall, and dance album, Arular takes its title from the political code name employed by M.I.A.'s father, Arul Pragasam; she contends that her father's "revolutionary ideals" are the album's thematic base. "In Sri Lankan, arular means 'enlightenment from the sunshine' or something", she remarked, "but a friend pointed out that it was a pun in English – 'a ruler' – which is funny because he is a politician. And my mum always used to say about my father, 'He was so useless, all he ever gave you was his name'. So I turned it around and turned that something into nothing. And at the same time I thought it would be a good way to find him. If he really was an egomaniac, he'd be looking himself up and he'd get this pop album stealing his name that would turn out to be me, and he'd have to get in touch", a prediction which ultimately came true. Despite reports to the contrary, M.I.A. denied that her father was a member of the Liberation Tigers of Tamil Eelam, popularly known as the Tamil Tigers.

The album is influenced by music that M.I.A. listened to as a child in London, including hip hop, dancehall, and punk rock. She cited as particular influences Eric B. & Rakim, Public Enemy, and London Posse, whom she described as "the best of British hip hop". Her work on the album drew on the punk music of The Clash and music from genres such as Britpop and electroclash, to which she was exposed during her time studying at Central Saint Martins College of Art and Design. Living in West London, she met many musicians who to her defined an era of British music that was "actually credible". In a 2008 interview, she elaborated on the importance of the west London punk scene, citing acts such as The Slits, The Clash, and Don Letts; she claimed that Bow Wow Wow and Malcolm McLaren had a similar cultural impact in England to that of Public Enemy in America.

"I found understanding hip-hop a universal thing. Not just understanding the rhythm, how they danced, their style or their attitude; there was something else, beyond song structure and language. It works on a few basic human principles, in terms of what stimulation buttons to push...It had content and struggle behind it... and because I was able to adapt to it, hip-hop gave me a home, an identity. Hip-hop was the most guerrilla thing happening in England at the time. You had Public Enemy fronting it, and that felt like home, and I could dance while I was feeling shitty. It had a whole aesthetic to it – it was being really crass with pride."

— M.I.A., Arthur Magazine (May 2005)

Before the album's release, M.I.A. said that audiences found it hard to dance to political songs. This made her keen to produce music that sounded like pop but addressed important issues. "Sunshowers", with its lyrical references to snipers, murder and the PLO, was written in response to the Tamil Tigers being considered terrorists in some quarters. She said, "you can't separate the world into two parts like that, good and evil. America has successfully tied all these pockets of independence struggles, revolutions and extremists into one big notion of terrorism." The lyrics caused controversy; MTV censored the sounds of gunshots in the song and MTV US refused to broadcast the video unless a disclaimer that disavowed the lyrics was added. The BBC described the lyrics as "always fluid and never too rhetorical" and sounding like "snatches of overheard conversation". The songs deal with topics ranging from sex to drug dealing.

Musically, the album incorporates elements of baile funk, grime, hip hop, and ragga. Peter Shapiro, writing in The Times, summed up the album's musical influences as "anything as long as it has a beat". Some tracks drew on Tamil film music, which M.I.A. listened to while growing up. Shapiro described her music as a "multi-genre pile-up" and likened it to her graphic art, calling it "vivid, gaudy, lo-fi and deceptively candyfloss". In a 2005 interview, when asked about the difficulty in categorising her sound, M.I.A. explained, "Influences are crossing over into each other's puddles. I just accept where I'm at, I accept where the world is at and I accept how we receive and digest information. I get that somebody in Tokyo is on the internet instant messaging, and someone in the favelas is on the internet. Everybody seems to know a little bit about everything and that's how we process information now. This just reflects that."

== Artwork ==
M.I.A. and Steve Loveridge created all the album's artwork, using what Spin writer Lorraine Ali called a "guerrilla" style. The CD booklet features motifs of tanks, bombs and machine guns, and depictions of tigers, which writers connected with the Tamil Tigers. Village Voice critic Robert Christgau connected the album's imagery with the artist's "obsession" with the organisation, but claimed that its use was purely artistic and not propaganda. In his view, the images were considered controversial only because "rock and roll fans are assumed to be stupid" and would not be expected to ascertain their true significance. Similarly, PopMatters writer Robert Wheaton observed that tiger imagery "does predominate M.I.A.'s vision of the world", but noted that the tiger is more widely associated with Tamil nationalism and that the singer's use of such imagery did not necessarily indicate her support for the Tamil Tigers. Joshua Chambers-Letson determined that the imagery was perhaps "a means of negotiating the violence necessary" and described the controversy as "an attempt to disengage" from the performative intervention that M.I.A.'s album's made, through what he called "the complicated negotiation" of M.I.A.'s own autobiographical trauma, violence, and loss, as well as the geopolitical trauma, violence, and loss that her audience are engaged in from different subject positions.

== Release ==
Arular was to be released in September 2004, but was delayed. M.I.A.'s record label stated that the delay was caused by problems obtaining permission to use an unspecified sample. Revised release dates of December 2004 and February 2005 were publicised, but the album remained unreleased; at one point, Pitchfork announced that it had been shelved indefinitely. It was eventually released on 22 March 2005, when XL Recordings made it available in the US, albeit with the track "U.R.A.Q.T." omitted as the issues with a sample had not been resolved. The UK edition was released the following month with the track included, and this edition was released in the US by Interscope Records on 17 May. Arular sparked internet debates on the rights and wrongs of the Tamil Tigers. By the time it was released, a "near hysterical buzz" on the internet had created "slavish anticipation" for the album. Despite this, M.I.A. claimed in late 2005 that she had little comprehension of her prior popularity with music bloggers, stating that she did not even own a computer.

== Promotion ==
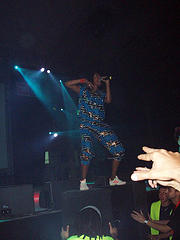
M.I.A. performing at the 2005 Sónar festival

The first track from the album to be made available was "Galang". It was initially released in late 2003 by independent label Showbiz Records, which pressed and distributed 500 promotional copies before M.I.A. signed with XL Recordings. The song was re-released on XL as the second official single from the album in September 2004, and again in October 2005, under the title "Galang '05", with a remix by Serj Tankian. The first official single, "Sunshowers", was M.I.A.'s first on XL and was released on 5 July 2004. It was supported by a music video directed by Indian filmmaker Rajesh Touchriver. Following the re-release of "Galang", the third single from the album, "Bucky Done Gun", was released on 26 July 2005. The video was directed by Anthony Mandler.

In December 2004, M.I.A. independently released a mixtape titled Piracy Funds Terrorism, produced by M.I.A. and Diplo, as a "teaser" for the album. The release featured rough mixes of tracks from Arular mashed up with songs by other artists, and was promoted by word-of-mouth. In early 2005, after the release of Arular, an extensive collection of fan-made remixes of M.I.A.'s work was uploaded, expanded and made available as an "online mixtape" on XL's official website, under the banner Online Piracy Funds Terrorism. M.I.A. toured extensively during 2005 to promote the album. The Arular Tour included concerts in North America supporting LCD Soundsystem and appearances at music festivals in Europe, Japan and South America. In November 2005, she appeared as the support act at a number of dates on Gwen Stefani's Harajuku Lovers Tour.

== Critical reception ==
Professional ratings
Aggregate scores
Source	Rating
Metacritic	88/100
Review scores
Source	Rating
AllMusic	5/5 stars
Blender	4/5 stars
Christgau's Consumer Guide	A
Entertainment Weekly	A−
The Guardian	4/5 stars
The Independent	4/5 stars
NME	7/10
Pitchfork	8.6/10
Rolling Stone	4/5 stars
Spin	A

Arular received widespread acclaim from music critics. Metacritic, which assigns a weighted mean rating out of 100 to reviews from mainstream critics, reported an average score of 88 based on 33 reviews, described as "universal acclaim".

Writing for Pitchfork, Scott Plagenhoef called the album "a taut, invigorating distillation of the world's most thrilling music; a celebration of contradictions and aural globalization that recasts the tag "world music" as the ultimate in communicative pop rather than a symbol of condescending piety". Julianne Shepherd of Spin appreciated the album's fusion of "hip hop's cockiness with dancehall's shimmy and the cheap and noisy aesthetics of punk" and claimed that Arular would be regarded as the best political album of the year. Sasha Frere-Jones, writing in The New Yorker, described the album as "genuine world music", based on "the weaving of the political into the fabric of what are still, basically, dance tunes". Adam Webb, writing for Yahoo! Music, described the album's style as "professionally amateurish" and M.I.A.'s approach as "scattergun", but said that she "effortlessly appropriates the music of various cultures and filters them through the most elementary equipment".

Robert Christgau, in praise of the album, stated that "the vertiginous excitement of pan-ethnic identity [...] imbues every pieced-together track", and characterised the violence referenced throughout as "a fact of life to be triumphed over, with beats and tunelets stolen or remembered or willed into existence". He added that "this is the territory I've always wished Missy Elliott would risk". In his review for Stylus Magazine, Josh Timmermann described Arular as "a swaggering, spitting, utterly contemporary album" and went on to say, "We've not heard its like before." Rolling Stone writer Rob Sheffield found Arular "weird, playful, unclassifiable, sexy, brilliantly addictive".

Other reviewers were not as complimentary. Paste's Jeff Leven said that the album, although strong, was not as "mindblowing" as many critics were saying. Q characterised the album as "style mag-cool pop-rap" and claimed that it lacked the substance suggested by M.I.A.'s decision to name it after her father.

Arular was nominated for the Mercury Prize and the Shortlist Music Prize, and was named as the best album of the year by Stylus Magazine. The album placed second in two major critics' polls, The Village Voice's 33rd annual Pazz & Jop poll for the Best Album of 2005 and The Wire's annual critics' poll for Record of the Year. The Washington City Paper chose it as the second best album of the year, and Pitchfork and Slant Magazine named Arular the fourth best of 2005. The Observer listed it as one of the year's five best albums.

=== Reappraisal and commercial performance ===
Arular was featured in the book 1001 Albums You Must Hear Before You Die, where it was described as "the most sparkling debut since Madonna's first album". The singer Nelly Furtado expressed her admiration for M.I.A.'s style, flow and dancing on Arular, having listened to it during the recording of her album Loose. Thom Yorke of alternative rock band Radiohead cited M.I.A.'s method of music making on Arular as an influence on his own work, saying that it reminded him of "just picking up a guitar and [liking] the first three chords you write" as opposed to "agonizing over the hi-hat sound which seems to happen with programming and electronica a lot of the time". In 2009, the NME placed the album at number 50 in its list of the 100 greatest albums of the decade. In 2009, online music service Rhapsody ranked the album at number four on its "100 Best Albums of the Decade" list. In 2011, Rolling Stone ranked the album number 52 on its list of the 100 best albums of the 2000s. Clash magazine ranked the album at number 7 on their list of the "50 greatest albums of our lifetime (since 2004)". Pitchfork ranked the album the 54th best album of the 2000s. In 2019, the album was ranked 32nd on The Guardian's 100 Best Albums of the 21st Century list, while in 2020, Rolling Stone ranked the album at number 421 in their list of the 500 Greatest Albums of All Time. In July 2022, Rolling Stone also ranked Arular as the 77th best debut album of all time.

Arular peaked at number 190 on the US Billboard 200, while reaching number three on the Top Electronic Albums chart and number 16 on the Top Independent Albums. By May 2010, it had sold 190,000 copies in the United States. The album peaked at number 98 on the UK Albums Chart, while in mainland Europe, it reached number 20 in Norway, number 47 in Sweden, number 71 in Germany and number 97 in Belgium.

== Track listing ==
XL US edition
No.	Title	Writer(s)	Producer(s)	Length
1.	"Banana Skit"	Maya Arulpragasam		0:36
2.	"Pull Up the People"	M. Arulpragasam; A. Brucker; Paul Byrne	Brucker; Byrne	3:45
3.	"Bucky Done Gun"	M. Arulpragasam; Wesley Pentz; Bill Conti; Ayn Robbins; Carol Connors	Diplo; Wizard^{[a]}	3:46
4.	"Fire Fire"	M. Arulpragasam; Anthony Whiting	Whiting	3:38
5.	"Freedom Skit"	M. Arulpragasam		0:42
6.	"Amazon"	M. Arulpragasam; Richard X	Richard X	4:16
7.	"Bingo"	M. Arulpragasam; Whiting	Whiting	3:12
8.	"Hombre"	M. Arulpragasam; Dwain 'Willy' Wilson III	Wilson	4:02
9.	"One for the Head Skit"	M. Arulpragasam		0:29
10.	"10 Dollar"	M. Arulpragasam; Richard X	Richard X	4:03
11.	"Sunshowers"	M. Arulpragasam; Ross Orton; Steve Mackey; August Darnell; Stony Browder Jr.	Cavemen	3:16
12.	"Galang"	M. Arulpragasam; Justine Frischmann; Orton; Mackey	Cavemen	3:35
13.	"M.I.A." (hidden track, included at the end of track 12)	M. Arulpragasam; Frischmann; Sugu Arulpragasam	Diplo	3:27

XL UK/international and Interscope US editions
No.	Title	Writer(s)	Producer(s)	Length
1.	"Banana Skit"	M. Arulpragasam		0:36
2.	"Pull Up the People"	M. Arulpragasam; A. Brucker; Byrne	Brucker; Byrne	3:45
3.	"Bucky Done Gun"	M. Arulpragasam; Pentz; Conti; Robbins; Connors	Diplo; Wizard^{[a]}	3:46
4.	"Sunshowers"	M. Arulpragasam; Orton; Mackey; Darnell; Browder	Cavemen	3:16
5.	"Fire Fire"	M. Arulpragasam; Whiting	Whiting	3:28
6.	"Dash the Curry Skit"	M. Arulpragasam		0:40
7.	"Amazon"	M. Arulpragasam; Richard X	Richard X	4:16
8.	"Bingo"	M. Arulpragasam; Whiting	Whiting	3:12
9.	"Hombre"	M. Arulpragasam; Wilson	Wilson	4:02
10.	"One for the Head Skit"	M. Arulpragasam		0:29
11.	"10 Dollar"	M. Arulpragasam; Richard X	Richard X	4:03
12.	"U.R.A.Q.T."	M. Arulpragasam; Quincy Jones	KW Griff; Diplo^{[b]}	2:56
13.	"Galang"	M. Arulpragasam; Frischmann; Orton; Mackey	Cavemen	3:35
14.	"M.I.A." (hidden track, included at the end of track 13)	M. Arulpragasam; Frischmann; S. Arulpragasam	Diplo	3:27

Japanese edition bonus tracks
No.	Title	Length
14.	"Pull Up the People" (D'Explicit Remix)	3:00
15.	"Bucky Done Gun" (DJ Marlboro Carioca Remix)	2:37
16.	"Bucky Done Gun" (Y£$ Productions Remix)	3:26
17.	"Bucky Done Gun" (DaVinChe Remix)	3:00

Digital bonus tracks

- "You're Good" – 4:13
- "Lady Killa" – 3:32
- "Do Ya" – 3:22

Notes

- ^{^a} signifies an additional producer
- ^{^b} signifies a co-producer
- "Bucky Done Gun" is inspired by "Injeção" by Deize Tigrona and incorporates elements of "Gonna Fly Now" by Bill Conti.
- "U.R.A.Q.T." contains a sample from "Sanford and Son Theme (The Streetbeater)" by Quincy Jones.

== Personnel ==
Credits were adapted from the liner notes, Apple, and Black Melody Productions.

- Maya Arulpragasam – vocals, artwork
- A. Brucker (Switch under a pseudonym) – production ("Pull Up the People"), final mix and production ("Bucky Done Gun", "U.R.A.Q.T.")
- Paul Byrne – production "Pull Up the People", final mix and production ("Bucky Done Gun", "U.R.A.Q.T.")
- Diplo – production ("Bucky Done Gun", "M.I.A."), co-production "U.R.A.Q.T."
- Pete Hofmann – engineering, mixing ("Amazon", "10 Dollar")
- KW Griff – mixing, production "U.R.A.Q.T."
- Steve Loveridge – artwork design
- Richard X – production ("Amazon", "10 Dollar")
- Nesreen Shah – chorus vocals ("Sunshowers")
- Anthony Whiting – mixing, production ("Fire Fire", "Bingo")
- Dwain 'Willy' Wilson III (Richard X under a pseudonym) – production ("Hombre")
- Wizard – additional production, mixing, programming ("Bucky Done Gun")

== Charts ==
=== Weekly charts ===
Chart (2005)	Peak position
Australian Albums (ARIA)	145
Belgian Albums (Ultratop Flanders)	97
German Albums (Offizielle Top 100)	71
Japanese Albums (Oricon)	78
Norwegian Albums (VG-lista)	20
Scottish Albums (Official Charts)	93
Swedish Albums (Sverigetopplistan)	47
UK Albums (Official Charts)	98
UK Independent Albums (Official Charts)	8
UK R&B Albums (Official Charts)	23
US Billboard 200	190
US Top Dance Albums (Billboard)	3
US Independent Albums (Billboard)	16

=== Year-end charts ===
Chart (2005)	Position
US Top Dance/Electronic Albums (Billboard)	12
Chart (2006)	Position
US Top Dance/Electronic Albums (Billboard)	22

== Release history ==
Region	Date	Label	Ref.
United States	22 March 2005	XL	
Germany	18 April 2005	XL	
United Kingdom	18 April 2005	XL	
Australia	22 April 2005	XL	
Sweden	25 April 2005	XL	
France	26 April 2005	XL	
United States	17 May 2005	Interscope	
Japan	22 June 2005	Sony	
