= FabricLive.51 =

Compilation album by FabricLive
- Released: April 2010
- Genre: Electro, Tech House
- Label: Fabric
- Producer: The Duke Dumont

FabricLive chronology
FabricLive.50 (2010)	FabricLive.51 (2010)	FabricLive.52 (2010)

FabricLive.51 is a 2010 DJ mix album by The Duke Dumont. The album was released as part of the FabricLive Mix Series.

== Track listing ==
1. Saturn V - Come into my Life - Spectral Sound / Ghostly International
2. Audio Soul Project - Reality Check (Vincenzo Remix) - Dessous Records
3. Bodycode - Imitation Dub - Spectral Sound / Ghostly International
4. Argy & The Martinez Brothers - Debbie Downer - Objektivity
5. Federleicht - On the Streets (Kollektiv Turmstrasse's Let Freedom Ring Remix) - Connaisseur Recordings
6. Alessio Mereu & Matteo Spedicati - Attraction - Toys for Boys Records
7. Gerd & The House Vectors - We Bring U Muzik - 4lux
8. Green Velvet - They came from Outer Space - Relief Records
9. Late of the Pier - Bathroom Gurgle (The Duke Dumont Remix) - EMI
10. Scuba - Hundreds and Thousands - Hotflush
11. Ieyasu Tokugama - Ryozen - WC Recordings
12. Floating Points - K&G Beat - Planet Mu Records
13. Idioma - Landscapes - Marketing
