= FabricLive.50 =

Compilation album by dBridge
- Released: February 2010
- Genre: Drum and bass
- Label: Fabric
- Producer: dBridge & Instra:mental

DBridge chronology
FabricLive.49 (2009)	FabricLive.50 (2010)	FabricLive.51 (2010)

FabricLive.50 is a 2010 DJ mix album by dBridge and Instra:mental. The album was released as part of the FabricLive Mix Series.

== Track listing ==
1. Riya – Seems Like – Exit Records
2. Instra:mental – From the Start – Autonomic
3. Stray – Pushed – Exit Records
4. Dan Habarnam – Nu Este Roz – Exit Records
5. Vaccine – Ochre – NonPlus+
6. ASC – Starkwood (Consequence Remix) – Unreleased
7. Consequence – Lover's Shell – Unreleased
8. Distance – Sky's Alight (Dub) – Autonomic
9. Alix Perez – Self Control – Shogun Audio
10. 2 Tracks Mixed:
  1. Genotype – Distorted Dreams – Genotype
  2. Meleka – Go (Accapella) – Meleka
11. Instra:mental – End Credits – NonPlus+LTD
12. Instra:mental – Watching You – NonPlus+
13. Instra:mental – Fist (Level 2B Mix) (A.K.A. Bubble Lab) – Unreleased
14. Consequence – 11 Circles (ASC Remix) – Unreleased
15. dBridge – I Know – Exit Records
16. Instra:mental – Encke Gap – NonPlus+
17. 2 Tracks Mixed:
  1. Loxy & Genotype – Farah's Theme – Exit Records
  2. dBridge – Inner Disbelief (Accapella) – Exit Records
18. Pearson Sound – Down with You – Darkestral
19. Scuba – Tense (dBridge Remix) – Hotflush Recordings
20. Instra:mental – No Future (Consequence Remix) – NonPlus+
21. Code 3 – Living Proof – Exit Records
22. Consequence ft Instra:mental – Reflex Reaction – Exit Records
23. ASC – Phobos – NonPlus+
24. Skream – Fire Call – Exit Records
25. Instra:mental – Machine Made – NonPlus+
26. dBridge – Love Hotel – Exit Records
27. dBridge – The Dim Light – Exit Records
28. Scuba – Eclipse – Paul Rose
29. ASC – Ubiquity Incident – NonPlus+
30. Abstract Elements – Abysmal Depth – Exit Records
31. Actress – Gen Ohn (Screwed Version) – Werk Discs
