= PAUS =

Portuguese rock band

- Origin: Lisbon, Portugal
- Genres: Alternative rock, Math rock, Progressive rock
- Years active: 2009–present (Note: PAUS are set to break up in 2026, following the end of the tour.)
- Labels: Enchufada; Universal Music; Sony Music Entertainment; Altafonte
- Members: Hélio Morais; Joaquim Albergaria; Fábio Jevelim; Makoto Yagyu
- Past members: João "Shela" Pereira

PAUS are a Portuguese rock band from Lisbon, formed in 2009. The band currently consists of Fábio Jevelim (vocals, keyboards), Makoto Yagyu (vocals, bass), Hélio Morais (vocals, drums) and Joaquim Albergaria (vocals, drums).

PAUS are noted for using a "siamese drum set". The band's sound is influenced by a variety of styles, including math rock, krautrock, progressive rock and African music. Their 2018 album Madeira reached number-one in the Portuguese album charts.

After releasing their final album Enterro in 2026, the band plans to disband after a farewell tour at the end of the year.

== Members ==
Current members

- Hélio Morais – vocals, drums (2009–present)
- Joaquim Albergaria – vocals, drums (2009–present)
- Makoto Yagyu – vocals, bass (2009—present)
- Fábio Jevelim – vocals, keyboards (2012–present)

Past members

- João "Shela" Pereira – vocals, keyboards (2009–2012)

== Discography ==
=== Studio albums ===
Title	Details	Peak chart positions
Title	Details	POR
PAUS	Released: October 24, 2011; Label: Enchufada; Formats: CD, LP, digital download	3
Clarão	Released: April 28, 2014; Label: Universal Music; Formats: CD, LP, digital download	—
Mitra	Released: February 12, 2016; Label: Universal Music; Formats: CD, LP, digital download	25
Madeira	Released: April 6, 2018; Label: Sony Music; Formats: CD, LP, digital download	1
YESS	Released: October 25, 2019; Label: Sony Music; Formats: CD, LP, digital download	14
Paus e o Caos	Released: September 29, 2023; Label: Altafonte; Formats: LP, digital download	—
Enterro	Released: March 13, 2026; Label: Altafonte; Formats: LP, digital download	—
"—" denotes a recording that did not chart or was not released in that territory.

=== Extended plays ===
- É Uma Água (2010)
