= FabricLive.52 =

Compilation album by FabricLive
- Released: August 2010
- Genre: Drum and bass
- Label: Fabric
- Producer: Zero T

FabricLive chronology
FabricLive.51 (2010)	FabricLive.52 (2010)	FabricLive.53 (2010)

FabricLive.52 is a 2010 DJ mix album by Zero T. The album was released as part of the FabricLive Mix Series.

== Track listing ==
1. Paradox - A Certain Sound (Alaska & Paradox Lost DAT Mix) - Paradox
2. Kabuki ft. Jeru the Damaja - Watch your Step (Need for Mirrors VIP Mix) - V
3. Ulterior Motive - Seven Segments - Unreleased
4. Slam - Positive Education (Zero T Remix) - Soma
5. Lynx & Kemo - You are being Lied To - Detail
6. Icicle - Ocular - Shogun Audio
7. Zero T ft. Script - Guessing Games - Footprints
8. System - Speed of Light - Footprints
9. Lemonde - Heaven - Valve
10. Jubei - Distrust - Shogun Audio
11. Break - Wine - Symmetry
12. All Thieves - Stars (Zero T Remix) - Footprints
13. Need for Mirrors - Sick in the Head - Footprints
14. Rockwell - Everything (& U) - Darkestral
15. Artificial Intelligence & Krust - Audio Assault - V
16. Fracture & Neptune - The Limit - Astrophonica
17. Dillinja - When Love - Valve
18. Zero T ft. Steo - Walk Away (Zero T Reprint) - CIA
19. Genotype - Dubsoca - Unreleased
20. Commix - Japanese Electronics (Instra:mental Remix) - Metalheadz
21. SP:MC & Joker D - Down - Unreleased
22. Icicle - Xylophobia - Shogun Audio
23. Compound One - Pum Pum Beat - Compound One
24. Sia - Little Man (Exemen Remix) - Long Lost Brother
25. Ation - Missing You - Unreleased
26. Equinox - Space Dub - Scientific Wax
27. Marcus Intalex - 21 - Soul:r
28. Calibre - Reach - Unreleased
29. Reds ft. Tehbis & Fee Lups - Green Lanes - Footprints
