= Branko (DJ) =

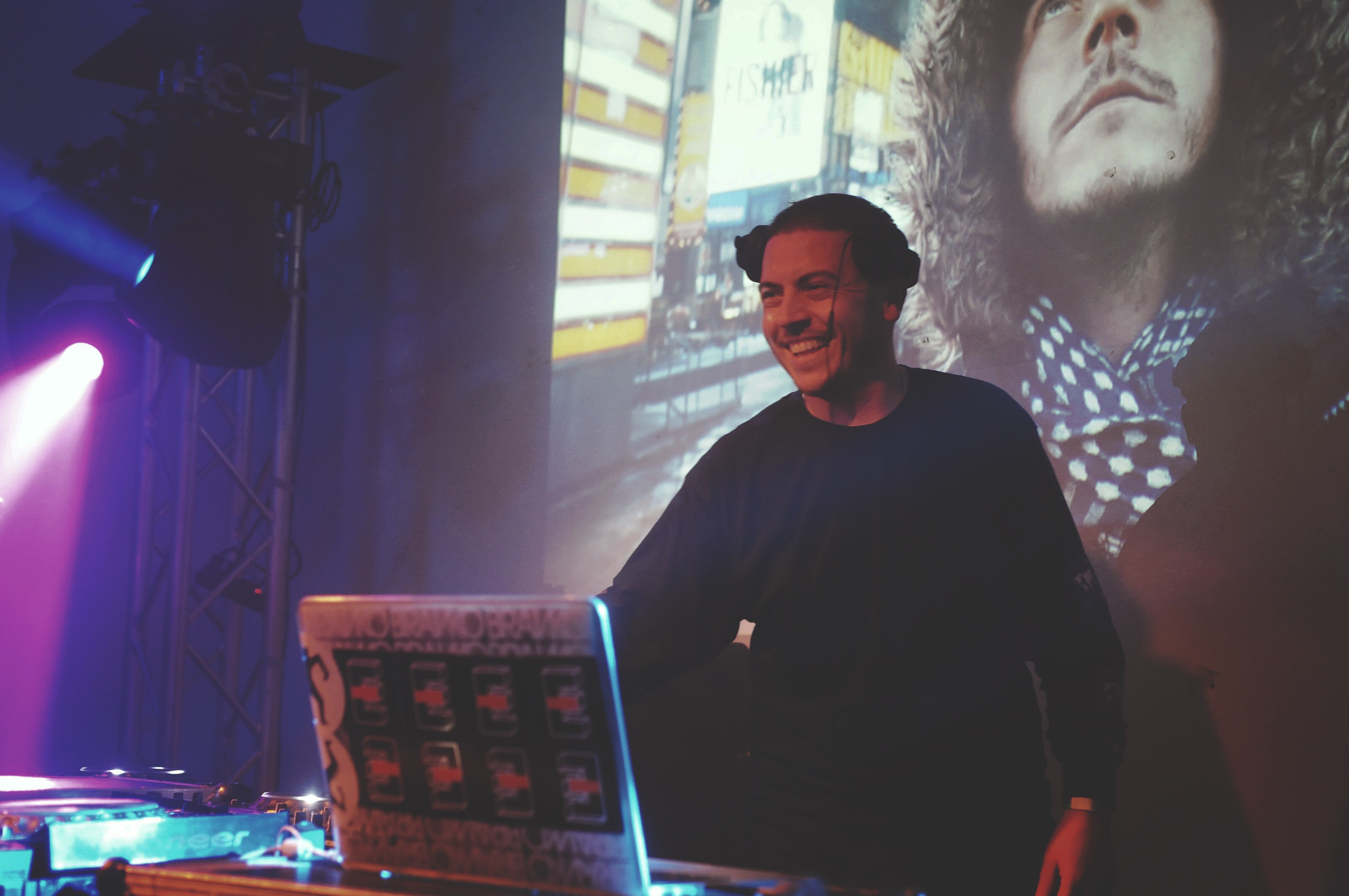

Background information
- Also known as: Branko
- Born: João Barbosa; 28 November 1980 (age 45); Lisbon
- Origin: Portugal
- Genres: Global Club Music; Electronic dance
- Occupations: Record producer; DJ; musician
- Instruments: Sampler; Percussion
- Label: Enchufada
- Website: enchufada.bandcamp.com

João Barbosa (born 28 November 1980), commonly known as Branko (formerly known as J-Wow), is a Portuguese DJ and producer who first became known as part of the Buraka Som Sistema.

== Career ==
His debut album as Branko, Atlas, was released in 2015 — inspired by his travels around Cape Town, New York, Amsterdam and São Paulo — and featured collaborations with Princess Nokia and DJ Sliink and with Rodes Rollins on the track "Out Of Sight (So Right)".

Branko's popular track "Let Me Go" featuring Mr. Carmack & Nonku Phiri, gained traction on sites such as i-D, Hypebeast and The Fader.

He has worked with artists like Santigold and Anik Khan, as well as M.I.A., with whom he worked on her 2016 album AIM.

Branko also oversees a monthly radio show on NTS, Enchufada Na Zona, which is broadcast live from the label's headquarters in Lisbon, and formed the inspiration for a compilation of the same name.

He performed as one of the interval acts, along with Sara Tavares, Mayra de Andrade and Dino D'Santiago, during the final of the Eurovision Song Contest 2018, which was held in Lisbon.

Branko's second solo album Nosso was announced on 22 January 2019 by Rolling Stone. It features collaborations with Sango, Cosima, Mallu Magalhães, Dino d'Santiago, Catalina García of Monsieur Periné, Pierre Kwenders, Miles From Kinshasa, Umi Copper, PEDRO and Dengue Dengue Dengue.

In 2024 Branko released a new single, "Slide", featuring Jay Prince building up for the release of the album SOMA in March of the same year.

== See also ==
- Enchufada

Preceded by ONUKA	Eurovision Song Contest; Final Interval act 2018 with Sara Tavares & Mayra Andrade	Succeeded by Madonna
