= Sara Tavares =

Portuguese singer-songwriter (1978–2023)

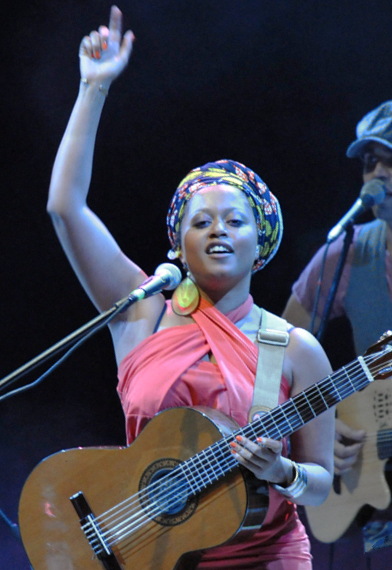
- Tavares in 2011

Background information
- Born: Sara Alexandra Lima Tavares; 1 February 1978; Lisbon, Portugal
- Died: 19 November 2023 (aged 45) Lisbon, Portugal
- Genres: Pop; jazz; world
- Years active: 1994–2023

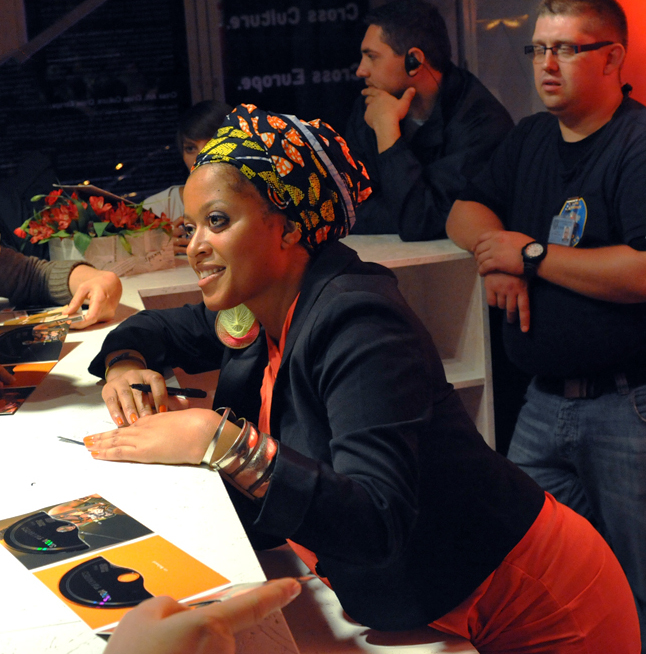
Tavares signing a copy of her latest record in Warsaw, September 2011

Sara Alexandra Lima Tavares (Portuguese: [ˈsaɾɐ taˈvaɾɨʃ]; 1 February 1978 – 19 November 2023) was a Portuguese singer, composer, guitarist and percussionist. She was born and raised in Lisbon, Portugal. Second-generation Portuguese of Cape Verdean descent, she composed African-, Portuguese- and North American-influenced world music.

== Early life ==
Tavares's parents were immigrants from Cape Verde who settled in Almada in the 1970s. She was born on 1 February 1978. While still a child, she was left in the care of an old woman when her father left the family and her mother moved to the south of the country with her younger siblings.

Tavares showed great musical promise from a young age; in 1994 she won the national television song contest Chuva de Estrelas, performing Whitney Houston's "One Moment in Time". That same year, she won the Festival da Canção, that earned Tavares a slot in the Eurovision Song Contest 1994 at the age of 16. Her winning song, "Chamar a Música," was featured on her debut EP, Sara Tavares & Shout (1996), where Tavares mixed gospel and funk with her native Portuguese influences.

Her debut album Mi Ma Bô was produced by Lokua Kanza and released in 1999.

In 2017, eight years after Xinti, Tavares released Fitxadu. The album was inspired in Lisbon's different African sounds and cultures and features a more electronic and urban sound than Tavares's previous works. The album received a Latin Grammy nomination for Best Portuguese Language Roots Album.

== Artistry ==
Tavares composed in Portuguese and Portuguese-based creole languages. Although Portuguese was the main language of her songs, her repertoire includes multilingual songs mixing Portuguese with Portuguese Creole and even English in the same song.

She won the 1993/1994 final of the Endemol song contest Chuva de Estrelas (performing Whitney Houston's "One Moment in Time"), which helped her win the Festival RTP da Canção final in 1994, consequently earning a place in the Eurovision Song Contest 1994, with the song "Chamar a Música" which reached 8th place.

Tavares was also known for singing the European-Portuguese version of "God Help the Outcasts" for the Disney movie The Hunchback of Notre Dame, which won a Disney Award for the best version of the original song. She also won a Portuguese Golden Globe for Best Portuguese Singer in 2000.

Tavares named Donny Hathaway, Stevie Wonder, Tina Turner and Aretha Franklin as her favourite childhood artists. Her music was noted to feature a blending of cultures, particularly those of Portugal and Cape Verde. Tavares was among a group of Portuguese-born artists of African origins, that helped bring African influences to mainstream music in Portugal.

== Personal life ==
In 2021, Tavares publicly revealed that she discovered she was bisexual at the age of 24.

== Death ==
Sara Tavares died on 19 November 2023 in Lisbon, at age 45, from a brain tumour with which she had been diagnosed in 2009.

== Legacy ==
The song Pé de choro by Huca, which competed in Festival da Canção 2024, is a tribute to Tavares.

== Discography ==
- Sara Tavares & Shout (1996)
- Mi Ma Bô (1999)
- Balancê (2006)
- Alive! in Lisboa (2008)
- Xinti (2009)
- Fitxadu (2017)

== Sources ==
- Sieber, Timothy (2005). "Popular music and cultural identity in the Cape Verdean post-colonial diaspora" (PDF). Etnográfica. 9 (1): 123–148. doi:10.4000/etnografica.2952. S2CID 132716215.

Preceded by Anabela with "A cidade (até ser dia)"	Portugal in the Eurovision Song Contest; 1994	Succeeded by Tó Cruz with "Baunilha e chocolate"
Preceded by ONUKA	Eurovision Song Contest; Final Interval act 2018 with Branko & Mayra Andrade	Succeeded by Madonna
