= FabricLive.53 =

Compilation album by Drop the Lime
- Released: September 2010
- Genres: Electronic music, dubstep, rockabilly
- Label: Fabric

Drop the Lime chronology
FabricLive.52 (2010)	FabricLive.53 (2010)	FabricLive.54 (2010)

FabricLive.53 is a 2010 DJ mix album by Drop the Lime. The album was released as part of the FabricLive Mix Series.

== Track listing ==
1. Supra1 - Ghoster - Trouble & Bass
2. Nouveau Yorican - Jackit (Drop the Lime Remix) - Mixmash
3. Melé - Bombay (Nadastrom Remix) - Mixpak Records
4. Egyptrixx - Everybody Bleeding - Night Slugs
5. Drop the Lime - Thwomp Stomp - Trouble & Bass
6. WAFA - Ewid Disco - Grizzly
7. Drop the Lime - Hot Sauce Grillz - Trouble & Bass
8. Maurice - This is Acid - Casablanca / Trax
9. Untold - Anaconda - Hessle Audio
10. Autoerotique - Bubonic (Drop the Lime Remix) - Dim Mak / Downtown
11. Berou & Canblaster - Terence Hill (French Fries Remix) - unreleased
12. Slick Wick Crew - 911 VIP - Trouble & Bass
13. Drop the Lime - Sex Sax (Club Mix) - Trouble & Bass
14. Bill Haley & His Comets - (We're Gonna) Rock Around the Clock - Geffen
15. The Strangeloves - I Want Candy - Sony
16. Foamo - Centavo - Fat! Records
17. Zombies for Monkey - Kolkata (Sticky Version) - Trouble & Bass
18. Sam Tiba - Barbie Weed - Top Billin
19. Mosca - Square One (L-Vis 1990 Remix) - Night Slugs
20. Adonis - No Way Back - Trax
21. Femme en Fourrure - Dirty Blonde (Drop the Lime Remix) - Discobelle
22. Tom Piper & Blaze Tripp - Brrrap! - Bigger than Barry / No Frills
23. Baobinga ft. DJ Nasty - State of Ghetto Jackin' (TRG Remix) - Trouble & Bass
24. AC Slater ft. Drop the Lime - Calm Down Part 3 - Trouble & Bass
25. Little Jinder - Youth Blood (Villa Remix) - Trouble & Bass
26. Drop the Lime ft. Carrie Wilds - Set me Free (Reso Remix) - Trouble & Bass
