= Sound of Kuduro =

Single by Buraka Som Sistema featuring DJ Znobia, M.I.A., Saborosa, and Puto Prata

from the album Black Diamond
- Released: 15 February 2009
- Recorded: 2008
- Genre: Kuduro
- Length: 3:37
- Label: Enchufada; Fabric Records
- Songwriter(s): Buraka Som Sistema; DJ Znobia; Maya Arulpragasam; Saborosa; Puto Prata
- Producer(s): Lil Jon; DJ Riot; Conductor

Buraka Som Sistema singles chronology
"Wawaba (v. 1.8)" (2007)	"Sound of Kuduro" (2009)	"Aqui Para Vocês" (2009)

M.I.A. singles chronology
"Paper Planes" (2008)	"Sound of Kuduro'" (2009)	"Born Free" (2010)

Puto Prata singles chronology
"Sound of Kuduro'" (2009)	"Sozinho" (2013)

Music video
- "Sound of Kuduro" on YouTube

"Sound of Kuduro" is a kuduro song by Buraka Som Sistema featuring DJ Znobia, M.I.A., Saborosa and Puto Prata, from their album Black Diamond released in 2008. The song was recorded in Angola, and a video for the song was recorded in 2007. "Sound of Kuduro" also appeared on the special edition of M.I.A.'s Kala. Pitchfork Media placed the song at number 97 on their best tracks of 2008 list.

== Music video ==
The video for the song was recorded in Angola in 2007, and features footage of the vocalists recording for the song around the country, travelling around the city, joining street and yard parties and local dancers. The video was posted onto YouTube in March 2008, receiving attention across the blogosphere.
