= Dengue Dengue Dengue! =

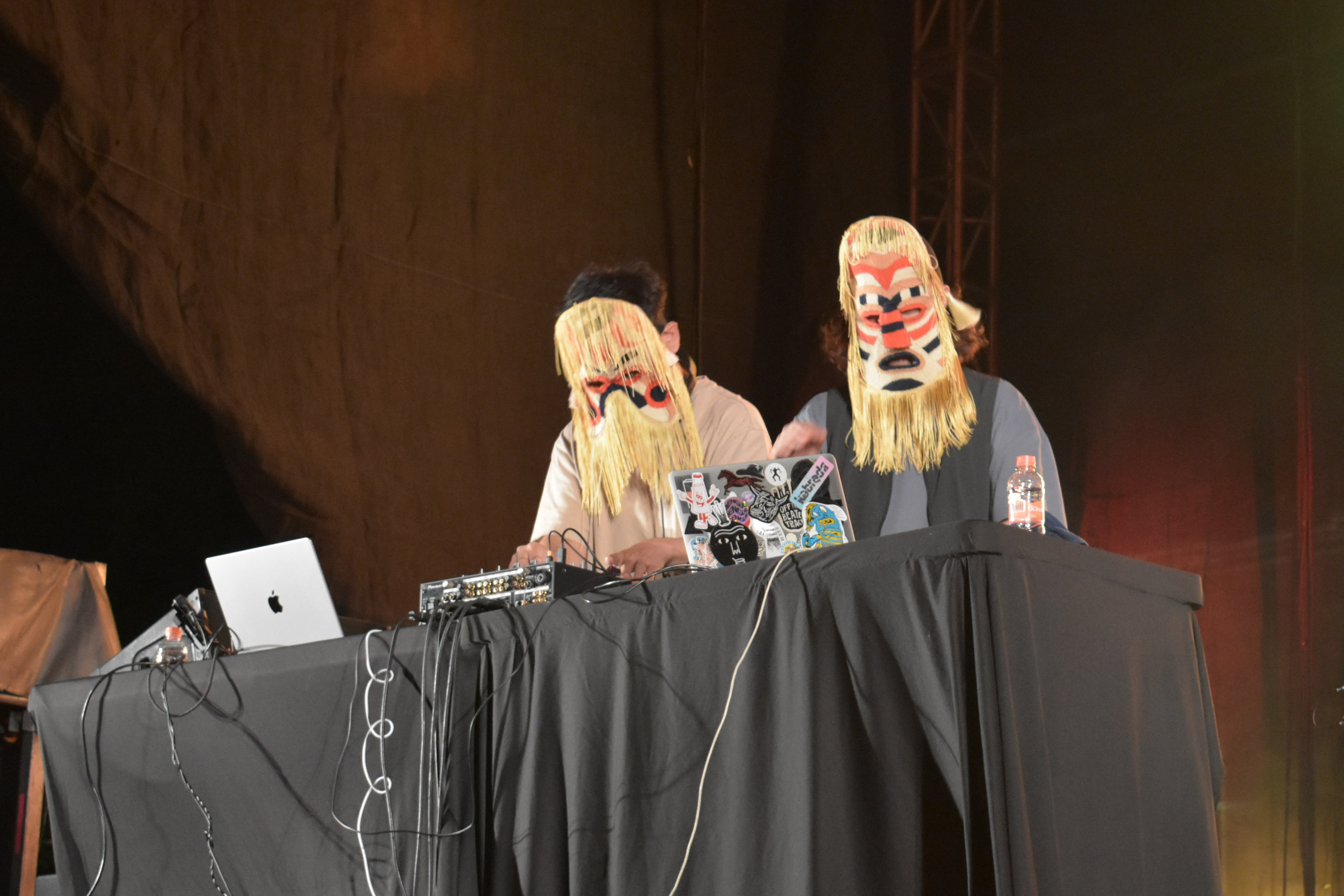

Background information
- Origin: Lima, Peru
- Genres: Electronic music; Latin; reggae; Peruvian cumbia
- Years active: 2010–present
- Website: denguedenguedengue.net

Dengue Dengue Dengue! is a musical duo of electronic music from Peru established in Lima, made up of Rafael Pereira and Felipe Salmon.

For their concerts they are accompanied by Nadia Escalante, VJ Sixta. Likewise, a characteristic of their live performances is to appear in masks of colorful and traditional aesthetics.

== History ==
The musical project was born in 2010 in Lima, when Lima-born musicians Rafael Pereira and Felipe Salmon after attending the Trimarchi graphic design festival in Argentina decided to explore Amazonian cumbia and psychedelic music through electronics. Among their musical influences was Los Wembler's de Iquitos band.

In 2012, they released their first album, La alianza profana. Since then they began to incorporate various styles of domestic dances from all over Latin America, the Caribbean and Africa, including zouk, dancehall, kuduro and tarraxo. The pair began performing at festivals in Peru and later toured throughout South America, Central America, Europe and Asia, including performing at the 2014 Sónar Festival.

In 2014 they published Serpiente dorada, and two years later, Siete raíces. In 2018, they released Son de los diablos, referring to the traditional Afro-Peruvian dance Son de los Diablos, where they delve into this musical style. Dengue Dengue Dengue explored traditional Afro-Peruvian rhythms, most notably on the 2019 album Zenit & Nadir, one of their releases featuring live percussion from the Ballumbrosio brothers. For this, they worked with the Ballumbrosio family, a Peruvian musical dynasty known for preserving indigenous rhythms, including landó, festejo, and criolla music, as well as quijada, a percussive instrument carved from a donkey's jawbone.

In 2020, being based in Berlin, Germany, they published Fiebre with the Mexican label NAAFI, where they make use of polyrhythms and minimalism. In August 2020, the duo launched the Kebrada label with a new compilation, titled Discos en 3/Cuartos, released in September 2020. The compilation featured 11 melodies from different musicians, such as DJ Python, and a new Dengue Dengue Dengue track.

== Discography ==
=== EPs ===
- Serpiente dorada (2014)
- Son de los diablos (2018)
- Semillero (2018)
- Fiebre (2020)

=== LPs ===
- La alianza profana (2012)
- Siete raíces (2016)
- Zenit & Nadir (2019)
