= Galang (song) =

2003 single by M.I.A.

Single by M.I.A.

from the album Arular
- Released: 2003 (limited edition); 25 October 2004 (Australia release); 1 November 2004 (UK re-release); 11 October 2005 ("Galang '05")
- Recorded: 2003
- Genre: Dancehall; worldbeat; electronic
- Length: 3:35
- Label: XL Recordings; Interscope; Showbiz
- Songwriters: Maya Arulpragasam; Justine Frischmann; Steve Mackey; Ross Orton
- Producer: M.I.A.

M.I.A. singles chronology
"Galang" (2003)	"Sunshowers" (2004)

Music video
- "Galang" on YouTube

"Galang" is the debut single by British musician M.I.A. from her debut album Arular. It was released in 2003 on Showbiz Records which pressed 500 vinyl copies, gaining immediate international recognition via radio airplay, fashion shows, club rotations and internet filesharing. "Galang" was re-released on 1 November 2004 via XL Recordings as the second single from the album released by the label and was released for a third time as "Galang '05" on 11 October 2005 by the label and in the US by Interscope Records. It is written by Maya "M.I.A." Arulpragasam, Justine Frischmann, Ross Orton and Steve Mackey.

It first appeared on M.I.A.'s six song demo tape in 2003, then on her official Myspace account on 9 June 2004 and was later reworked slightly by Orton and Mackey who received production credit for the song. "Galang" was the second song M.I.A. wrote on her Roland MC-505, intending for the piece to be performed by Frischmann's band Elastica. Inspired by her experiences and observations of life in London, M.I.A. wrote the song to encourage her friends in the band to continue to make music. However, after cowriting the song, Frischmann convinced M.I.A. to record "Galang" herself, complimenting the piece's lyrical narrative and music direction.

Musically, "Galang" is a dance-oriented midtempo song, combining elements of dancehall, electro, jungle, and world music. M.I.A.'s voice is heard in a whooping chant-like rap over polyrhythmic Roland MC-505 arrangements of beats, drums, claps and synths along the song's bassline. The word 'galang' comes from Caribbean slang word for 'go along', in the sense of 'behave'. The lyrics of the song are ambiguous, and could be interpreted differently by listeners, containing hidden innuendo to cannabis use, sex, and violence and references to songs such as "London Calling" and "Purple Haze". The song comments on a weed smoking young character in London, caught in street battles, paranoid and harassed by police while looking for work in the city. "Galang" was a major critical success amongst contemporary and older critics, who frequently hail its sound and lyrics as novel, reflective and ahead of their time. It charted in the UK and Canada and reached number 11 on the US Billboard Hot Dance Singles Sales.

The song's accompanying music video, directed by Ruben Fleischer and art directed by M.I.A. portrays the singer in several costumes roaming and dancing amidst stencils of her single artwork and images from her 2001 Alternative Turner Prize nominated exhibition, animated in the background. With the video, scholars note that multiple M.I.A.s appear against a backdrop of militaristic animated graffiti, utilising symbolism of urban Britain and war, tiger imagery and Tamil script stencils. The video was given vitality by the bold use of day-glo colour and her distinct design technique in the art, her costumes and music, triggering the new rave revolution upon its release. "Galang" appeared on several publications' lists of the best song of the year, decade and of all time. The song's rapid international propagation through radio, fashion shows and the internet along with "Sunshowers" made it one of the first viral phenomena in the modern age, and affirmed M.I.A as one of the first popstars of the digital age.

"Galang" has been covered by jazz pianist Vijay Iyer and is officially remixed by Serj Tankian and Dave Kelly, both appearing on the B-side of its 2005 reedition. The song has appeared in the feature film Pride and Glory, a commercial for Honda Civic and the television series Sherlock and Entourage. M.I.A. performed the song on Sen kväll med Luuk and Late Night with Conan O'Brien and performs the song on her concert tours, first on her Arular Tour and most recently the Maya Tour where it was well appreciated by fans. Hailed as one of M.I.A.'s defining tracks, her persona in the song has influenced numerous artists worldwide, led to M.I.A.'s acceptance by a generation who emulated her music, style and fashion, and cemented her position as a global indie music cultural icon.

== Background ==
Following her work as a photographer/graphic designer and music video director for the band Elastica, M.I.A. decided to video document the band's last tour together in 2001 to direct the music video for their single "Mad Dog God Dam". On the tour, she was introduced to the Roland MC-505 sequencer/drum machine by electroclash artist Peaches, whose minimalistic approach to music inspired her. She found Peaches' decision to perform without additional instrumentation to be brave and liberating and felt that it emphasised the artist. While vacationing together in Bequia in the Caribbean, M.I.A. began experimenting with Elastica singer Justine Frischmann's 505, having unexpectedly gaining access to it in London. She adopted her stage name, "M.I.A.", standing for "Missing In Acton" during this time, following from her documentary film in Jaffna and her art exhibition of the same name. M.I.A. used the 505 to make demo recordings in her bedroom. She initially planned to work as a producer. Composed as a song for Elastica to encourage the band to continue making music, Frischmann convinced M.I.A to record music herself instead after co-writing the composition. M.I.A. lacked confidence in making music and to this end, she approached Caribbean girls in clubs to see if they would provide vocals for the songs, but without success. She chose to perform the vocals herself, saying "I just quietly got on with it ... I didn't wanna convince anyone it was good. I felt it was much better to prove that I could be an individual."

== Composition ==
"Galang" is a moderately fast song, with a tempo of 101 beats per minute. It combines dancehall, jungle, electroclash and worldbeat with folk style chants, and is set in common time. The song features sparse instrumentation throughout, consisting primarily of minimal "jarring" polyrhythm beats written with a drum machine and "blaring" Moog synthesiser sounds as the song's riff. Its rhythms are influenced by traditional Sri Lankan songs, and feature beeps, bloops and electronic loops. It is in verse-chorus form before the fourth and final chorus and a vocal coda. Composed in London using a second-hand 4-track tape machine, the Roland MC-505, and a radio microphone, M.I.A. recorded "Galang" in the same vein as the rest of Arular, the song eventually becoming part of a six song demo tape that included "Lady Killa", and her first ever composition "M.I.A." Having produced rough tracks via trial and error, she honed the finished songs in collaboration with other writer-producers. Through these collaborations, she sought to produce a diverse style and "drag [her collaborators] out of their boxes, musically". Steve Mackey and Ross Orton, under the name Cavemen, worked further on "Galang" with M.I.A in a professional studio, where she added a bass line and new vocals to give the song a more analogue sound than was possible with the 505. The track was co-written by Frischmann, whose input M.I.A. described as "refreshing" due to Frischmann's experimental approach to lyrical themes. Speaking openly about the lyrical origins of the song, she said "This was only the second track I ever wrote, so I was still experimenting. I just wanted to put down all the advice everyone had said to me about how to survive in London."

== Release and song use ==
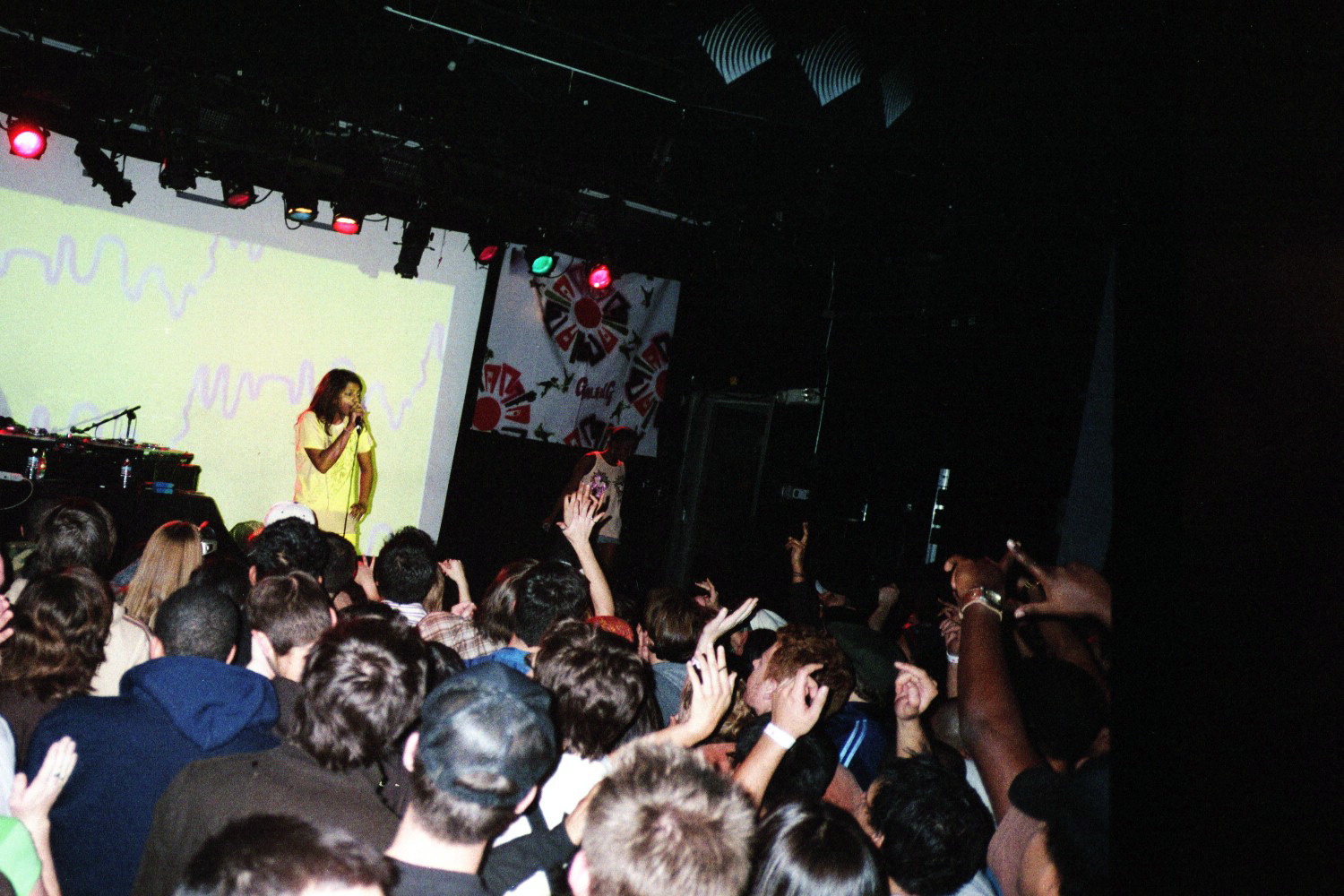
M.I.A performing "Galang" at the beginning of her Arular Tour in 2005, with the single artwork in the background

The single/demo was the first release for Jonathan Dickins' Showbiz Records, a label that operated through Dicken's uncle's record label Instant Karma. Upon pressing 500 12-inch vinyl copies of the single and demo, it made an immediate impact in dance clubs, college radio, fashion shows and record labels. On the vinyl, "Galang" appeared alongside acapella and instrumental versions of the song. "Galang" became popular with BBC Radio 1 DJs Gilles Peterson and Pete Tong, the latter including the song as part of his Essential Selection radio set in 2003. The success of the song led to a signing with XL Recordings and M.I.A. requesting Dickens to work as her manager, beginning Dickens career in music industry management. M.I.A. wanted to sign to XL due to the label office's proximity to her house, and her respect for label owner Richard Russell and his pioneering involvement with the rave scene in 1990s London that the singer was a fan of. Uploading the song and others she had recorded onto music sharing website MySpace in June 2004 paralleled the file-sharing and fast propagation of "Galang" and "Sunshowers" around the Internet by word-of-mouth, increasing the songs' international listenership. This led to wide acclaim for the singer, who is hailed as one of the first artists to build a large fanbase exclusively via these channels and as someone who could be studied to reexamine the internet's impact on how listeners are exposed to new music. Malik Meer of The Guardian notes how the spread of "Galang" across the web confirmed M.I.A's status as one of the first popstars of the digital age, while Gary Shteyngart, writing for GQ, commented on how the song went viral across the internet "before anyone was even using the word "viral".

"Galang" was released in Australia by Remote Control Records on 25 October 2004 and rereleased on 1 November 2004 by XL Recordings as the second official single from the album, in two CD formats and a 12-inch vinyl format. On the first CD a remix by Cavemen appeared on the B-side, while on the second the same remix and an instrumental version appeared on the B-side alongside a remix by South Rakkas. "Galang" was released again in October 2005 following her signing to Interscope Records in the US, under the title "Galang '05", with one remix by Dave Kelly featuring the singer Cham, and another by Serj Tankian.

Jazz pianist Vijay Iyer recorded an acoustic jazz version of Galang with his trio for the album Historicity. M.I.A. performed the song on 5 November 2004 on Sen kväll med Luuk and on 27 May 2005 on Late Night with Conan O'Brien. "Galang" was featured in an advertisement for the Honda Civic, and was also used in the episode "The Abyss" from season 2 on Entourage. The song featured on the 2008 video game Dancing Stage Universe 2. The song featured in the 2008 film Pride and Glory. "Galang" appears on the video game Dance Central released in 2011.

== Live performances ==
"Galang" has featured on the setlist of the Arular Tour, Kala Tour, People Vs. Money Tour and Maya Tour, all major concert tours that M.I.A has undertaken. She ended her set in the Gobi tent at the 2005 Coachella Valley Music and Arts Festival with the song, leading to an encore in response to crowd enthusiasm, a rarity for the festival and the first tent encore at Coachella. Describing the performance she said, "When I played three years ago, it was such a crazy moment. It was my first festival and I had only done about five shows in my entire life...They dismantled the stage and had to put it back together because all the people started going, 'M.I.A! M.I.A!' I don't think I'd ever be able to do something like that again, because it was my moment."

The rapper performed "Galang" and a cover of the rock band Kaiser Chiefs' "Everyday I Love You Less and Less" on Jo Whiley's BBC Radio 1 Live Lounge, on 6 September 2005, the day of the 2005 Mercury Music Prize ceremony.

== Critical reception ==
"Galang" earned massive critical success upon its release, with its novelty, genre amalgamation and lyrics highlighted as positive features of the song, and typical of the compositions on Arular. Michaelangelo Matos in the Seattle Weekly described the words "London calling, speak the slang now/Boys say wha' gwan, girls say wha' wha'," as "tempting" taunts "from the top," whilst appreciating the "jump-rope skip abetted with a flat-four stomp at the end of the second bar, great groaning wowing synth-bass, post-Diwali hand claps, and what sound like tuned bottles clinking along every so often." He continued "The lift-up-and-over moment comes at 2:30, when the beat subsides and an a cappella "Ya-ya-hey! Whoa-yay-oh-yay-ohhh!" so simultaneously plainspoken and transported you can feel the concrete beneath their sneakers and see the clear skies beyond the council flats." Spin noted that the rapper "kicks fierce digitized double Dutch rhymes in a room full of bug zappers" before declaring the song to be "more addictive than online poker." Sasha Frere-Jones, writing in The New Yorker, appreciated the track's lyrics, feeling the track's "'Ya ya heeey, woy oy ee he hay yo' wasn't a pop chorus, or any sound that you'd hear on American radio, even if the station were playing, you know, world music. It's a voice from a place where kids throw rocks at tanks, where people pull down walls with their bare hands. It could be the sound of a carnival, or a riot." i-D called the song "massive," while Dazed & Confused described the song as a "nagging electro bashment monster." NME described the song as "100 per cent ersatz: Sri Lanka imagined from a Shoreditch loft, Jamaican riddim conjured up from a GameBoy memory card." The reviewer implored listeners to not "be fooled by the sweetness of Maya's singalong patois, though", concluding that "'Galang' secretes a martial edge under its seductive exterior; this is a song that advances on you, knife between clenched teeth" and that the single as a whole was effortlessly brilliant. It was also named Rough Trade's "Single of the Year." "Galang" placed highly in "Best of Year" and "Best of decade/Alltime" lists in several publications in various countries.

== Awards and accolades ==
The critical success of "Galang" was cemented after its appearance on several publications' Best of the Year Lists in 2004. The song has frequently been named one of the best compositions released in the 2000s decade and of all time. Blender positioned the song at number thirty nine on its list of the songs of the year, while it was named the seventh best single of the year on the Eye Weekly Canadian Critics Poll of 2004. Pitchforkmedia ranked "Galang" as the fourth best song the same year on their "Singles of the Year" list, while Rolling Stone (USA) – named it the tenth best on their "Singles of the Year" list. "Galang" positioned twelfth on Stylus magazine's "Singles of the Year" list while in the same year, it appeared eighth on the Village Voice list of the tops songs of 2004. German radio network 1LIVE named the song the twenty third best single on their 2004 list, while laut.de named it the forty fourth best song of the year. Iguana music magazine named it the ninety third best single of the year while Zündfunk of Germany named it the top single of 2004.

On its list of the "Top 500 Songs of the 80s–00s" period, Blender ranked "Galang" eighty one. Pitchforkmedia named the song the twentieth best song in their list "The 100 Best Singles of 2000–2004." Porcys of Poland named it the eleventh best song on their "100 Singles 2000–2004" list. The song appears at number forty one on Stylus magazine's list "The 50 Best Singles of 2000–2004". "Galang" is listed on The Pitchfork 500, a 2008 published book on the Pitchfork's "Guide to the Greatest Songs from Punk to the Present" in the 2003–2006 release period section. Swedish music magazine Sonic positioned the song at forty three on their "The 50 Best Songs of the 21st Century" list. Rolling Stone (Spain) named "Galang" the sixth best song on their list "The 100 Best Songs of the 21st Century". In 2010, Slant named the music video for "Galang" the forty-eighth "Best Music Video of the 2000s Decade".

== Music video ==
"...The principle (sic) idea behind M.I.A.'s artwork is to have pretty heavy/political ideas, but to present them in a poppy candy-coated wrapper. So someone might buy her painting because it is pretty to the eye, and not necessarily consider that it is a rebellious image that she is presenting. However, after they've had it for a while, they might start to think – why do I have a pink tank on my wall? … I think that ["Galang"] is a very successful video in that we have true images of revolution playing on MTV. However, because there's lots of pretty colors and a pretty girl dancing, no one blinks an eye. Hopefully we have succeeded in subconsciously starting the revolution."

— Director Ruben Fleischer talking to PopMatters about the video for "Galang".

The accompanying video for "Galang", featuring multiple M.I.A.s amid a backdrop of her graffiti artwork animated, was directed by Ruben Fleischer and art directed by M.I.A. M.I.A. told Negar Azimi of Bidoun she had collaborated with Steve Loveridge to spray paint her original artwork for the video, who worked in a car park while it rained. Fleischer animated her artwork to provide a backdrop for M.I.A.'s floppy, energetic, endearing dance stylings. Bright colors pop, a tiger streaks in the background, and rainbow-colored Tamil script adorns the stencils. M.I.A. sings and dances across the screen through the verses and chroruses, before the camera pans out to multiple M.I.A.s during the song's coda.

The musician decided to wear her own designs on the video, and collaborated with designer Carri Mundane on a tracksuit for the shoot. "Galang" received some airplay on MTV2's Subterranean series, and was also shown when she appeared as a guest on the show on 29 May 2005. Ranjani Gopalarathinam of Coolhunting notes that M.I.A.'s personal style "might be a little harder to imitate but believe me I will try – the b-girl vacations in the tropics, but won’t ever forsake her kicks for a pair of thongs (cuz she's gotta dance)", concluding "When you see the video you feel familiar with the visuals, but that's just because you WISH."

The visual artwork in the video, as Jason Jenkins of The Japan Times notes, shares the dichotomy present between M.I.A.'s music and lyrics; tanks, grenades and burning palm trees figure prominently in her work, but are presented in the video in bright, kaleidoscopic colours using stencils and Day-Glo spray paint. Rob Wheaton, writing in PopMatters noted that M.I.A.'s approach was an artistic risk, given the "superficial, ephermeral" nature of her chosen media – graffiti stencil art and popular music. He felt that her style was the opposite of radical artists like Fernando Solanas and Octavio Gettino, who followed Frantz Fanon in calling for an art that documented resistance while breaking down the barriers between spectator and artist, stating that "M.I.A.'s art and music, by contrast, are all spectacle. The two-dimensional stencils and the catchy hooks can only subvert the audience's role after their immediate appeal has worn off, and they lack the breadth to contain a full alternative program." However, he argued, this made sense to him, given that "the realm of the image is what M.I.A. is most determined to contest" including media role models promoted on MTV and the conformity of mainstream popular culture. Critics from Slant noted that against a backdrop of graffitied third-world signifiers—tigers, cell phones, palm trees, tanks, bombs—that pulsated along to the song's beats, M.I.A. "simply, and coyly," performs a silly little-girl dance, setting up what would become her multimedia M.O. for years to come.

== Cultural impact ==
Amy Phillips of Pitchforkmedia noted, following M.I.A's performance of "Galang" mashed up with "Lip Gloss" by Lil' Mama at the Terminal 5 club, CMJ Music Marathon, KALA Tour, how "Galang" served as a reminder of how much the mainstream pop, dance, rap musical landscape had shifted since M.I.A first appeared in 2004 with songs from Arular, highlighting megahits such as Fergie's "London Bridge" as having come to resemble M.I.A's sound. Steve Yates of The Guardian highlights the similarity between the latter and "Galang", which the head of Interscope Records Jimmy Iovine described as another case of M.I.A inspiring other artists. Resemblances between "Galang" and Beck's 2005 track "Clap Hands" have been noted by music critics, as have similarities between the video and artwork to that of Rihanna's 2010 hit "Rude Boy".

The uploading of "Galang" on social networking site MySpace in 2004 and its video's subsequent release and propagation led to the song and "Sunshowers" becoming the web's first viral successes and have contributed towards M.I.A's reputation as being "several miles" ahead of the pack in the music industry. Described as a new raver "before it was old", she is often praised for having triggered the genre and aesthetic into music in the mid-2000s. Hattie Collins of The Guardian noted how the songs of the album showcased M.I.A as a quirky female singer/rapper "before the Mini Allens had worked out how to log on to MySpace." When asked by Craig McLean of Spin about how she felt towards paving the way for Lily Allen's success, the singer was quoted as saying "she works with the same sort of sound, similar vibes to it, you just make a template. Of course, if you're the first one to do it it's really hard" but added that her familiarity with being an outsider and the privilege of artists such as Allen meant she was not frustrated that others had taken her template and sold more records with it, noting "I'm used to dealing with those situations better." Eddy Lawrence of Time Out commented how "Galang" alongside M.I.A's other releases helped make the singer a carnival queen and everyone's favourite "grime/electro/ravehall artist – beloved of the broadsheet fashionistas yet simultaneously patron saint and pin-up for the Day-Glo nu-rave kids." In December 2011, "Galang" was ranked number 10 on Time Out's list of the "100 best London songs" ever released.

== Track listings and formats ==
Showbiz Records 12" Vinyl (2003)

1. "Galang" – 3:35
2. "Galang" [a capella] – 3:18
3. "Galang" [instrumental] – 3:40

XL Recordings single "Galang" (2004)
CD single 1

1. "Galang" 3:35
2. "Galang" [Cavemen Remix] – 3:55

CD single 2

1. "Galang" 3:35
2. "Galang" [South Rakkas Mix] – 3:55
3. "Sunshowers" [Video]

12" vinyl

1. "Galang" [Cavemen's remix] – 3:55
2. "Galang" [Cavemen's remix] [instrumental] – 3:55
3. "Galang" [South Rakkas's remix] – 3:52
4. "Galang" [South Rakkas's remix] [instrumental] – 3:52

"Galang '05" (2005)
CD single 1

1. "Galang '05" – 3:53
2. "Galang" [Dave Kelly remix] (featuring Cham)

CD single 2

1. "Galang '05" – 3:53
2. "Galang" [Serj Tankian remix]
3. "U.R.A.Q.T." [DJ C remix]

7" vinyl

1. "Galang '05" – 3:53
2. "Galang" [Dave Kelly remix] (featuring Cham)

== Personnel ==
- Maya "M.I.A" Arulpragasam – main performer, artwork, producer, songwriting
- Steve Loveridge – artwork design
- Justine Frischmann – songwriting
- Cavemen – songwriting, producer, mixing

== Charts ==
Chart (2004)	Peak
UK Singles Chart	77
Chart (2005)	Peak
UK Singles Chart	77
UK Hip Hop and R&B Singles Chart	7
US Billboard Hot Dance Singles Sales	11

== Release history ==
Release dates and formats
Region	Date	Format	Label(s)	Ref.
United States	3 October 2005	Mainstream airplay	Interscope	
