= Drake Hotel (Toronto) =

Boutique hotel and cultural venue in Toronto, Ontario, Canada

The Drake Hotel
- The Drake Hotel in 2026
- Former names: Small's Hotel (1890–1949); The Drake (1949-2001, 2004–present)

General information
- Type: Hotel, Restaurant, Café, Bar, Music Venue
- Location: 1150 Queen Street West, Toronto, Ontario, Canada
- Coordinates: 43.643197°N 79.424661°W
- Year built: 1890
- Opened: February 14, 2004
- Renovated: 2001-2004, 2020-2021 (Modern Wing Expansion)

Renovating team
- Architect: Diamond Schmitt Architects (Modern Wing)

Other information
- Number of rooms: 51
- Number of restaurants: 3
- Number of bars: 3

Website
- www.thedrake.ca/thedrakehotel/

The Drake Hotel is a boutique hotel and cultural venue on Queen Street West in Toronto, Ontario, Canada. Located in the city's West Queen West area near Parkdale, it combines hotel accommodation with restaurants, bars, the Sky Yard rooftop patio, and the Drake Underground performance venue. Since reopening as an upscale boutique hotel in 2004, the Drake has been described as a West Queen West destination associated with art, design, dining, nightlife, and live music. The Drake Underground primarily features indie acts, though past performers include M.I.A., Billie Eilish and Beck.

== History ==
The venue was opened in 1890 as Small's Hotel. At the time, the area was a major Canadian Pacific Railway hub near what was then one of the wealthiest neighbourhoods in the city.

In 1949, the hotel was acquired by new owners who expanded the building and renamed it the Drake. The hotel eventually fell into decline. James Earl Ray described visiting "a bar around the corner"—likely the Drake—while living as a fugitive on nearby Ossington Avenue in 1968. In the 1970s, it fell into use as a flophouse like many hotels in North American cities. Other uses in the 1980s, and 1990s include a punk bar, and rave den.

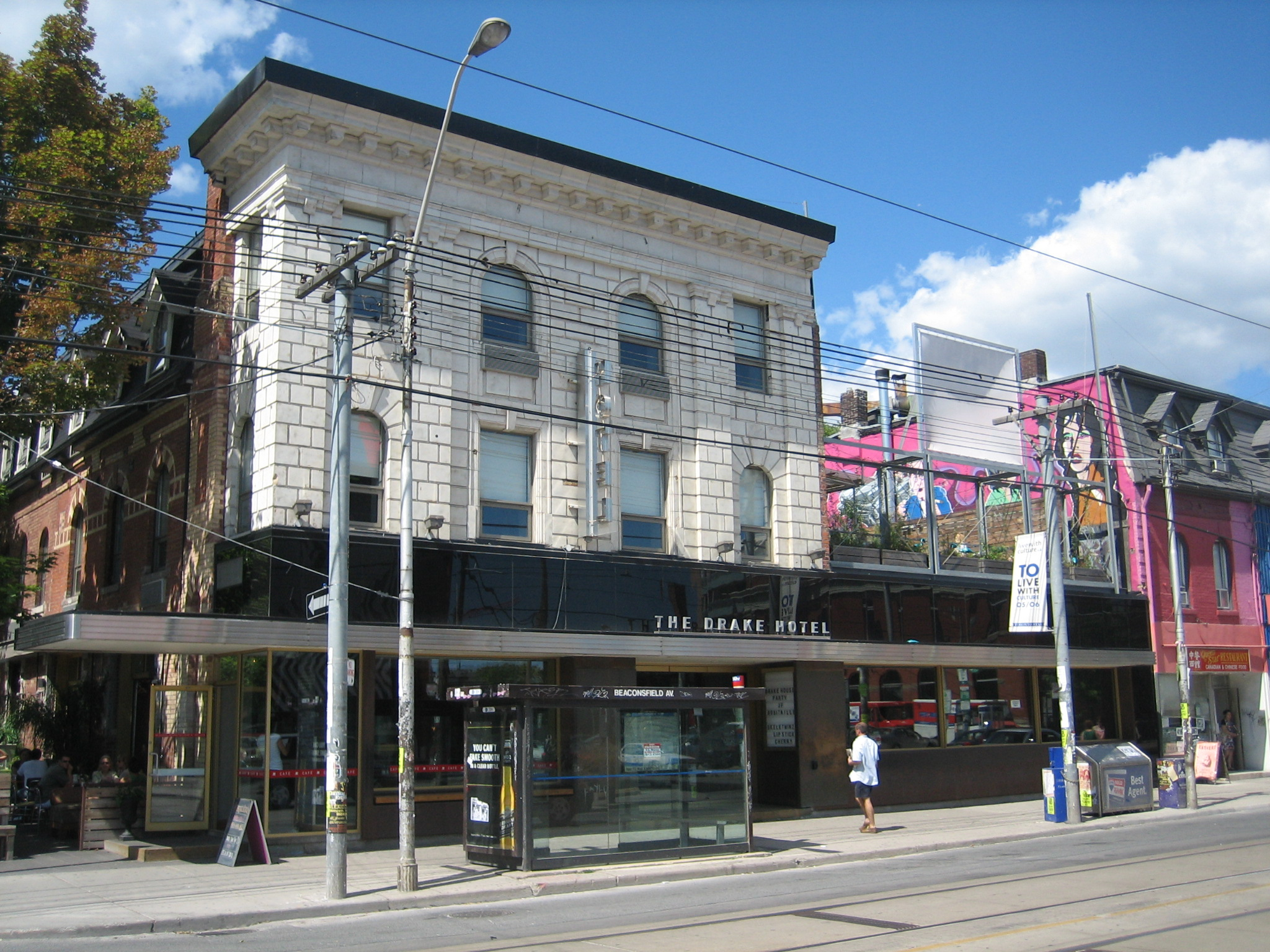
The Drake Hotel in 2007

In October 2001, the hotel was purchased for CA$860,000 by Jeff Stober, who planned a Toronto equivalent of the Hotel Chelsea where creative individuals would work and live. The hotel moved all tenants out and closed. After CA$6 million in renovations were completed, the Drake re-opened in February 2004 as an upscale boutique hotel. The current ownership has since expanded, opening a hotel in Wellington, Ontario, other restaurants in Toronto and the Drake General Store retail stores.

== See also ==
- Gladstone Hotel
