= Bucky Done Gun =

2005 single by M.I.A.

Single by M.I.A.

from the album Arular
- B-side: "Pull Up the People"
- Released: 11 July 2005
- Recorded: 2004
- Genre: Funk carioca; grime; hip hop
- Length: 3:46
- Label: XL Recordings
- Songwriters: Maya Arulpragasam; Carol Connors; Bill Conti; Thomas Pentz; Ayn Robbins; Deize Tigrona
- Producers: Diplo; Wizard

M.I.A. singles chronology
"Sunshowers" (2004)	"Bucky Done Gun" (2005)	"Boyz" (2007)

"Bucky Done Gun" is the third single from musician M.I.A.'s album Arular. The song was composed in London in 2004 as one of the last compositions for her debut album and credited to Maya "M.I.A." Arulpragasam, Carol Conners, Bill Conti, Wesley "Diplo" Pentz, Ayn Robbins and Deize Tigrona. It was released by XL Recordings in the UK, Interscope Records in the US and Remote Control Records in Australia on 11 July 2005 in 12-inch vinyl and CD single formats. The B-side of the release is the song "Pull Up the People" from Arular. Upon release, the song reached number 88 on the UK Singles Chart.

"Bucky Done Gun" is an uptempo baile funk-dancehall song, combining elements of electro, grime, hip hop and pop music. The song is inspired from Tigrona's funk carioca song "Injeção" from where a drum loop is included and flipped and horns are sampled but recomposed from the song "Gonna Fly Now" composed by Conti, Conners and Robbins. The song is produced by Diplo with additional production by Dave "A. Brucker" Taylor, P. Byrne and Wizard. The song's title word "Bucky" is a reference to the London grime slang word for a gun, while the composition is lyrically influenced by her experiences of civil war in Sri Lanka and how the songwriter viewed the journey of rap music. The song was a critical success, with many contemporary critics complimenting the tough yet raw themes of revolution and sexuality in the song's music direction and lyrics.

The song's accompanying music video directed by Anthony Mandler was filmed on a desert in Nevada, US. M.I.A. intended for the video to be shot in the favelas in Brazil, but could not shift filming there due to time and budget constraints. The video portrays the singer performing live in an underground nightclub and a desolate wasteland, mixed with scenes of teenagers throwing grenades of smoking colour at buildings. M.I.A and her live backup singer Cherry Byron-Withers provocatively grind against a chain-linked fence and giggling children play in dirty streets and damp landscapes amidst flags of her single artwork. The release of the song and the video's rotation on MTV Brasil marked the first time that a funk carioca-inspired song was played on mainstream radio and music television in Brazil, the genre's country of origin, and contributed towards her rise in popularity there.

M.I.A. performed the song on 3 May 2005 on Jimmy Kimmel Live! and performs the song on her concert tours, first on the Arular Tour and most recently on the /\/\ /\ Y /\ Tour where it was well appreciated by fans. M.I.A.'s performance of the song and "Injeção" with Tigrona at the 2005 TIM Festival in Brazil was a critical and fan success. "Bucky Done Gun" was included in the soundtrack of NBA Live 06, renamed and re-edited as "Bucky Done."

== Composition ==
"I don’t know!! (Laughs) I really don’t know. At the time, the concept that I was thinking of was how far we are going to go with gangster culture in rap music. That’s really what I was thinking about. I was thinking about 50 Cent. It started off as Public Enemy and ended with 50 Cent. What was that journey (for rap music) and how did that happen? In London, Bucky is a slang word for gun. It’s a real British, grime word. So I was thinking, what is the aftermath of gangster rap? Were they going to get into therapy?"

— M.I.A., when asked what "Bucky Done Gun" means by Ashlene Nand.

== Music video ==
The music video for "Bucky Done Gun" was directed by Anthony Mandler. Filming took place in the Mojave Desert.

It features Arulpragasam rapping aggressively against a desolate wasteland with erratic flags bearing her album artwork, erratically interspersed with scenes of her performing live in an underground nightclub, filmed in an artsy, guerrilla style. The video is also mixed with images of teenagers throwing grenades of smoking colour at buildings; Arulpragasam's live backup singer Ms. Cherry provocatively grinding against a chain-linked fence and giggling children playing in dirty streets and damp landscapes.

== Cultural impact and use in media ==
"Bucky Done Gun", as writer W. H. from Spin notes, led to Brazil being where M.I.A. had enjoyed her most remarkable resonance after the release of Arular. The song became a hit on MTV Brasil after its release, a first for the indigenous music scene of the favelas or urban ghettos in Rio de Janeiro. She stated in an interview from the country during her Arular Tour "There's a big divide between the classes. Favela Funk is seen as music of the poor people, and 'Bucky' is the first time they've played that sound on commercial radio. It's my first visit here and it's mayhem - me turning up at a funk ball is a big deal. It's kinda complicated." Critics have praised the development as encouraging and reflective of the emerging new reality, "the idea of populist art and populist technology dissolving cultural borders not with some Eurocentric stand-up-for-love sap ballad, but with a politicised 'let's fuck' anthem by a British Sri Lankan, produced by a Mississippi-born American DJ using a Rio de Janeiro ghetto groove." Hattie Collins of The Guardian highlights M.I.A. as a baile funk/political pop pioneer with the release paving the way for bands CSS and Bonde do Rolê to emerge in her wake.

The musician Mike Shinoda of alternative rock bands Linkin Park and Fort Minor highlighted the song as the latter band's anthem during the European leg of their 2005 tour. A remix of the song was played by DJ AM and Travis Barker during the 2008 MTV Video Music Awards.

The song was named the 215th best song of the decade by Pitchfork.

== Track listings and formats ==
CD 1

1. "Bucky Done Gun" [radio edit] – 3:45
2. "Pull Up the People" [D'Explicit remix] – 3:35

CD 2 / Australian CD single

1. "Bucky Done Gun" – 3:45
2. "Bucky Done Gun" [DJ Marlboro's Funk Carioca remix] – 2:37
3. "Bucky Done Gun" [¥£$ Productions's remix] – 3:26
4. "Bucky Done Gun" [DaVinChe remix] – 3:00
5. "Bucky Done Gun" [instrumental] – 3:46
6. "Bucky Done Gun" [a capella] – 3:17

12" vinyl single

1. "Bucky Done Gun" – 3:45
2. "Bucky Done Gun" [DaVinChe remix] – 3:00
3. "Pull Up the People" [D'Explicit remix] – 3:35

== Credits and personnel ==
- Songwriting – Mathangi Maya "M.I.A." Arulpragasam, Carol Conners, Bill Conti, Wesley "Diplo" Pentz, Ayn Robbins, Deize Tigrona
- Main performer - Maya "M.I.A." Arulpragasam
- Production - Diplo, Dave "A. Brucker" Taylor, P. Byrne
- Additional production - Wizard
- Mixing, final mix – Wizard, Dave "A. Brucker" Taylor, P. Byrne
- Programming - Wizard
- Artwork - Mathangi Maya "M.I.A." Arulpragasam

Adapted from album liner notes:

== Charts ==
Chart (2005)	Peak
UK Singles Chart	88
