= Gold Coast Parklands =

Racing complex in Gold Coast, Queensland

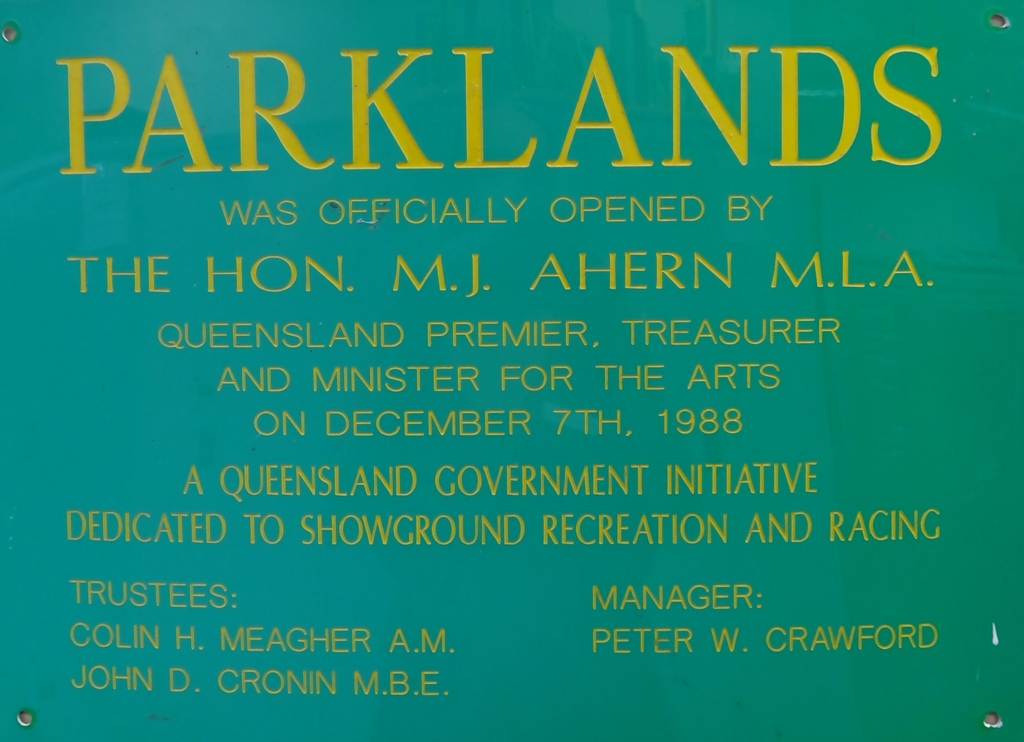
- Original Gold Coast Parklands sign removed from venue in 2013 prior to demolition of complex.
- Opened: 7 December 1988
- Closed: 2013

The Gold Coast Parklands was a complex serving the greyhound racing and harness racing industries on the Gold Coast, Queensland, Australia. It opened on 7 December 1988 on the corner of Smith Street and Parklands Drive, Southport on the Gold Coast, Queensland for nine million dollars.

== History ==
Plans to build the complex began in 1983 when the Racing Minister for Queensland, Mr Russell Hinze, visited the Gold Coast. He was reportedly disappointed by trotting and grey hound racing facilities at Owen Park, Southport. The decision was made to provide improved facilities at another location and State Government land and was selected opposite Griffith University.

The complex was managed by the Parklands Trust and was the home for a number of organisations including the Gold Coast Show Society, Gold Coast Greyhound Racing the Parklands Indoor Sports Centre and the Gold Coast Harness Racing Club. Between 1993 and 2013 it was also the venue for the annual Big Day Out concert. In 2007, The State Government announced plans to build a new hospital adjacent to the complex. This resulted in the departure of Gold Coast Greyhound Racing from Parklands in 2009. On 1 February 2013 the remaining part of the site was formally designated as the athletes' village for the 2018 Commonwealth Games and was declared a Priority Development Area (PDA) by the Government of Queensland. In August 2013 a call for stories, memories and photographs from the community to commemorate the history of Parklands was launched. These stories and ephemera relating to the complex were donated to the City of Gold Coast Local Studies Library.

Demolition of the buildings on the site commenced in late 2013 and in December 2013 Grocon won the contract to build the village. Grocon worked with consulting companies Cardno and Lat27 to create the new development.

== See also ==
- Sports on the Gold Coast, Queensland

== Bibliography ==
- The Gold Coast Bulletin, p. 56, 25–26 August 2007
- Kane, Charmaine; Lewis, David (5 April 2013). "Games athletes' village to oust community groups". Australian Broadcasting Corporation.
- The Gold Coast Bulletin. Southport. 10 August 2005. p. 13.
- Hurst, Daniel (29 May 2012). "Games tick: new board, same decision". The Brisbane Times. Brisbane.
- Staun, Fiona (2006), 100 years : history of the Gold Coast Show, Gold Coast Show Society
- "Parklands still a groundswell after 24 years years of memories showstopper", The Gold Coast Bulletin, p. 49, 31 August 2013
- Telforo, Simon (1 June 2013), "Rodders Paradise", Street Machine, 33 (6): 96–102
- Redmond, Renee (31 July 2008), "Hospital pass is end of an era : Howls of sadness at greyhound's clubs last night", The Gold Coast Bulletin, p. 42
- Gleeson, Peter (27 August 2007), "Big Day Out, showgrounds and harness racing track to stay put : Parklands keeps rocking", The Gold Coast Bulletin
- Grant, Dwayne (27 September 2013), "No winners as site sacrificed : harness racing fraternity bids solemn farewell to Parklands track", The Gold Coast Bulletin, p. 6
