= Sunshowers =

Single by M.I.A.

from the album Arular
- B-side: "Fire, Fire"
- Released: 5 July 2004
- Recorded: 2004
- Genre: Grime; dancehall; tropicália
- Length: 3:16
- Label: XL Recordings
- Songwriters: Maya Arulpragasam; Ross Orton; Steve Mackey; August Darnell; Stony Browder Jr.
- Producers: M.I.A.; Ross Orton; Steve Mackey; Anthony Whiting

M.I.A. singles chronology
| "Galang" (2003) | "Sunshowers" (2004) | "Bucky Done Gun" (2005) |

"Sunshowers" is a song by British musician M.I.A. from her debut studio album, Arular. It was written and produced by Maya "M.I.A." Arulpragasam, Ross Orton, Steve Mackey, August Darnell and Stony Jr. Browder, with additional vocals and production by Nesreen Shah and Anthony Whiting. The song was released as the second single of the album on 7 July 2004, following the 2003 release of debut "Galang", and is M.I.A.'s first official release with XL Recordings. Released in vinyl record and CD single format, with the song "Fire Fire" serving as the song's B-side, "Sunshowers" was distributed by Interscope Records in the US .

"Sunshowers" is a downtempo jungle-dance song, composed on the songwriter's Roland MC-505. The song's chorus interpolates the song "Sunshower" by Dr. Buzzard's Original Savannah Band. The song gained immediate international recognition following use in fashion shows, club rotations and internet filesharing. Designer Matthew Williamson opened and closed his fashion week runway show with the song in September 2004 in New York. "Sunshowers" and other songs such as "Galang" and "Fire Fire" propagated rapidly through international fashion shows and filesharing. The song debuted at number 22 on the Canadian Singles Chart and number 93 on the UK Singles Chart and was widely acclaimed among music critics, who noted its wide ranging lyrical subject matter, delivery and music direction as highlights of the track.

An accompanying music video for the song was directed by Rajesh Touchriver and filmed in South India. Writing the video, M.I.A. was inspired to work with Touchriver after watching his debut film In the Name of Buddha. The video, frequently cited by M.I.A. as her favorite ever made, faced censorship controversies on TV and Radio, and was banned from MTV after a refusal by the songwriter to censor some of the song's lyrics or run a disclaimer disavowing them. "Sunshowers" was ranked 100 on Slant's "Best of the Aughts: Singles," its list of the top 100 singles of the decade.

== Background ==
"Sunshowers" is about how in the news the world is being divided into good and evil with this axis of evil and terrorism thing, so the song is asking how can we talk about gun culture and other issues while Blair is preaching that if someone hits us, we should hit back twice as hard." — M.I.A.

== Release ==
"Sunshowers" was released 7 July 2004 as the first single of the album Arular released by XL Recordings. It followed the release of "Galang" on Showbiz Records the previous year. The single was released on CD and 12-inch vinyl format. The B-side to the CD single contains the song "Fire Fire", while an instrumental and a cappella version of the track also follow on the track listing of this format. On the 12" single, tracks 2 and 3 are switched.

Uploading "Sunshowers", "Galang" and others she had recorded onto music sharing website MySpace in June 2004 paralleled the file-sharing and fast propagation of the songs around the Internet by word-of-mouth, increasing the songs' international listenership. This led to wide acclaim for the singer, who is hailed as one of the first artists to build a large fanbase exclusively via these channels and as someone who could be studied to reexamine the internet's impact on how listeners are exposed to new music. Malik Meer of The Guardian notes how the spread of the songs across the web confirmed M.I.A's status as one of the first popstars of the digital age, while Gary Shteyngart, writing for GQ, commented on how her music went viral across the internet "before anyone was even using the word "viral". On 10 September 2004, the singer attended designer Matthew Williamson's "Spring 2005" show during the Olympus Fashion Week in New York, where "Sunshowers" was used on the runway.

== Critical reception ==
Writers for Slant, listing the song at number 100 on the "Best of the Aughts: Singles," its list of the Top 100 Singles of the Decade, noted the song's lyrical range and novelty in being used on fashion runway shows, saying "A runway is not the venue you expect to hear about gun culture, the Iraq War, the PLO, snipers, racial profiling, and sweatshops, but those are just some of the topics that M.I.A. managed to squeeze into the three-minute sophomore single from her debut album Arular." Adrien Begrand of PopMatters, citing the lyric "I salt and pepper my mango/ Shoot spit at the window" compared the song favourably to the song "Galang", noting that "Sunshowers" "continued the fascinating contrast between playful and defiant." Begrand described the song as speaking of urban violence and anti-Muslim sentiment in the West. Similarly, Josh Timmermann of Stylus magazine ranked the song alongside "Galang" as "among the most exciting singles of last year" and that the track "managed to sound like honey even while M.I.A. rapped (as much as Mike Skinner or Nellie McKay "rap") about a man being gunned down for associating with Muslims." He concluded "M.I.A. may be a critical darling, but she’s not so esoteric in the grand scheme of things. This is music that everyone can relate to, dance to, salt and pepper their mangoes to."

David Day of Dusted magazine, in a track-by-track review of the album, described the song as one of the three best songs on Arular and containing the best lyrics, citing its lyric "Like PLO we don't surrendo!" Day praised the use of the sample in the chorus, stating it brought the song "a real pop flavor that has crossover written in calligraphy. The beat, minimal like Missy and Lumidee, serves to spotlight her wordplay." Betty Clarke of The Guardian, noted the lyric "I [sic] bongo with my lingo/ Beat it like a wing yo [sic]/ Can't stereotype my thing yo", writing "a fractured backing of hip-hop beats and dancehall rhythms is peppered with poetic slang." Robert Christgau, writing in the Village Voice noted the references to violence in the song, saying it is "everywhere, dropped casually like a funk grenade or flaunted instructively as in the oft quoted "It's a bomb yo/So run yo/Put away your stupid gun yo." But not for a moment does the violence seem vindictive, sadistic, or pleasurable. It's a fact of life to be triumphed over, with beats and tunelets stolen or remembered or willed into existence." Ruth Jamieson of BBC called the song "achingly beautiful" with its "unsettling, unusual but ooh-so alluring vo-coded harmonies" singled out for praise.

== Music video ==
The music video for "Sunshowers" was directed by Rajesh Touchriver and filmed in the jungles of South India. M.I.A. has frequently cited it as her favourite music video ever made. In one scene, M.I.A. is perched atop an elephant. The song faced censorship controversies on TV and radio, and was banned from MTV after M.I.A. refused to remove the lines: "You wanna go? You wanna win a war? Like PLO, I don't surrendo" for airplay.

== Song use ==
The song's lyrics are sampled in the song "New Thing", released in 2011 by Rye Rye.

== Track listings and formats ==
CD single

1. "Sunshowers" – 3:16
2. "Fire, Fire" – 3:28
3. "Sunshowers" (Instrumental) – 3:15
4. "Sunshowers" (A cappella) – 2:52

The only difference the 12" single has is that tracks 2 and 3 are switched.

== Personnel ==
- Main Performer – Mathangi Maya "M.I.A." Arulpragasam
- Songwriting – Maya "M.I.A." Arulpragasam, Ross Orton, Steve Mackey, August Darnell, Stony Jr. Browder
- Production - Maya "M.I.A." Arulpragasam, Steve Mackey, Ross Orton, Anthony Whiting
- Vocals - Maya "M.I.A." Arulpragasam, Nesreen Shah (chorus)
- Mixing – Steve Mackey, Ross Orton, Anthony Whiting
- Artwork – Mathangi Maya "M.I.A." Arulpragasam

== Charts ==
=== Weekly charts ===
| Chart (2004) | Peak |
|---|---|
| UK Singles Chart | 93 |
| UK Hip Hop and R&B Singles Chart | 26 |
