= Buraka Som Sistema =

Portuguese electronic music band

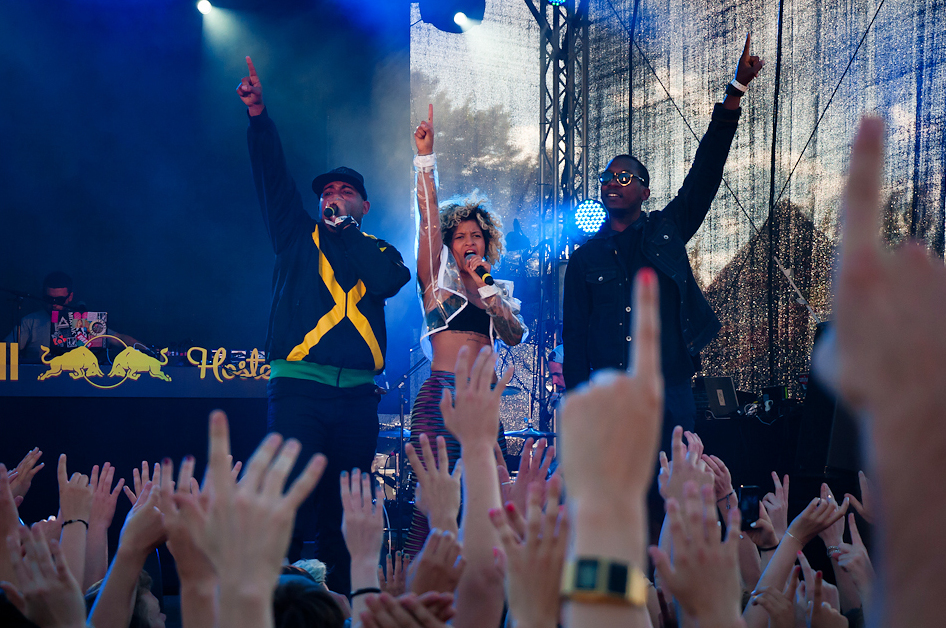
- Buraka Som Sistema performing at Mauer Park in 2013

Background information
- Origin: Lisbon area, Portugal
- Genres: Kuduro, breakbeat, zouk, alternative dance, moombahton
- Years active: 2006–2016
- Labels: Enchufada; Sony BMG; Aftercluv Dance Lab; Universal Music
- Members: DJ Riot; Branko; Conductor; Kalaf; Blaya; Fred

Buraka Som Sistema was an electronic dance music project from Portugal, specializing in a fusion of techno beats with the African zouk and kuduro genre. It is generally credited with creating the "zouk bass" and "progressive kuduro" variant and has received an MTV European Music Award. In 2015 Buraka Som Sistema said they would be taking an hiatus starting in 2016, and on 1 July 2016 they performed live for the last time in Lisbon, before they reunited and performed on 11 July 2026 in NOS Alive.

== Origins ==
Buraka Som Sistema was founded in 2002 by Branko (João Barbosa), Rui Pité (DJ Riot), Andro Carvalho (Conductor) and Kalaf Ângelo Epalanga.

Barbosa and Pité were producers from the Cool Train Crew collective, for which Kalaf was a frequent vocal collaborator. They were interested in creating a kuduro project, and had previously worked together as 1-UIK Project. They met Carvalho, a hip-hop producer from Angola and member of the hip-hop band Conjunto Ngonguenha, while he was in Portugal.

Buraka Som Sistema is the Portuguese word for word translation for Buraka Sound System, keeping the English word order (the correct translation would be "Sistema de Som da Buraka"). They took their name, Buraka, from the freguesia (urban district) of Buraca, located in the municipality of Amadora, in the suburbs of Lisbon.

== Career ==
Their first release was From Buraka to the World, an EP released on the Portuguese label Enchufada, which include the single "Yah!", featuring vocals by Angolan hip-hop MC Petty. It was followed by another Petty vocalized track, "Wawaba", and a re-release of From Buraka to the World, expanded to a full album.

After touring in several European countries, including playing at the Glastonbury Festival and Roskilde Festival, the three producers released "Sound of Kuduro" in 2007, which features rapping by M.I.A., DJ Znobia, Saborosa and Puto Prata. The track was a precursor to their second album, Black Diamond, which was released in 2008 by Sony BMG, followed by a new single, "Kalemba (Wegue Wegue)", with vocals by Pongolove. They are currently signed on to Aftercluv Dance Lab, a Latin EDM label launched by Universal Music. On 1 July 2016 Buraka Som sistema curated Globaile, a music event at the Torre de Belém grounds, as part of the Festas de Lisboa, where they performed their (supposedly) last concert. On 11 July 2026 they reunited and performed at NOS Alive.

== Usage in media ==
Their song was featured in EA Sports video game such as "Kalemba (Wegue-Wegue)" featuring Pongolove in FIFA 10 and "Restless" in 2010 FIFA World Cup South Africa. "Hangover (Ba Ba Ba)" is also featured in the video game Just Dance 2016. Their song Bota also featured in a 2014 adidas advert featuring Dani Alves.

== Discography ==
=== Studio albums ===
Year	Album	Chart positions			Sales	Certifications (sales thresholds)
Year	Album	POR	SPA	BEL	Sales	Certifications (sales thresholds)
2006	From Buraka to the World: Originally released as an EP; Later re-released as a full album with extra tracks	—	—	—	POR:-	AFP: -
2008	Black Diamond: First full studio album; Released: November 2008	7	—	54	POR: 10,000+; WW:20,000+	AFP:Gold
2011	Komba: Second studio album; Released: November 2011	4	—	—	POR: -; WW:-	AFP:-
2014	Buraka: Third studio album; Released: September 2014	—	—	—	—	—

=== Singles ===
Year	Title	Chart Positions			Album
Year	Title	SPA	BEL	EUR	Album
2007	"Yah"	-	-	-	Black Diamond
2007	"Wawaba (v. 1.8)"	-	-	-	Black Diamond
2008	"Sound of Kuduro" featuring DJ Znobia, M.I.A.	-	-	-	Black Diamond
2008	"Kalemba (Wegue-Wegue)"	1	-	87	Black Diamond
2009	"Aqui Para Vocês (feat. Deize Tigrona)"	-	-	91	Black Diamond
2011	"Hangover (BaBaBa) "	-	-	-	Komba
2011	"(We Stay) Up All Night"	-	-	-	Komba

== Awards ==
In the MTV Europe Music Awards 2007, they were 8th (out of 19) in the New Sounds of Europe International Competition and were one of the nominees for the Best Portuguese Act category. In the MTV Europe Music Awards 2008, the band won the Best Portuguese Act award.

=== MTV Europe Music Awards ===
The MTV Europe Music Awards is an annual awards ceremony established in 1994 by MTV Europe.

Year	Nominee / work	Award	Result
2007	Buraka Som Sistema	New Sounds of Europe	Nominated
2007	Buraka Som Sistema	Best Portuguese Act	Nominated
2008	Buraka Som Sistema	Best Portuguese Act	Won
2009	Buraka Som Sistema	Best Portuguese Act	Nominated

=== Golden Globes ===
The Golden Globes is an annual awards ceremony by Portuguese TV station SIC.

Year	Nominee / work	Award	Result
2009	Buraka Som Sistema	Group Of The Year	Won

=== European Border Breakers Awards ===
The European Border Breakers Award is an annual awards ceremony for artists or groups who reached audiences outside their own countries with their first internationally released album in the past year.

Year	Nominee / work	Award	Result
2009	Black Diamond	European Border Breakers Award	Won

=== BEFFTA Awards ===
Buraka Som Sistema won the BEFFTA International Entertainment Icons award on 25 October 2014. They told Sound And Motion magazine that they "were honoured to collect an award."
