= Deize Tigrona =

Brazilian funk carioca musician

- Born: Deize Maria Gonçalves da Silva; 1 January 1979 (age 47)
- Origin: Rio de Janeiro, Brazil
- Genre: Funk carioca
- Occupations: Singer, rapper
- Years active: 2002–2006, 2012–present

Deize Maria Gonçalves da Silva (born 1 January 1979), known professionally as Deize Tigrona, is a Brazilian funk carioca singer. Born in the São Conrado neighborhood of Rio de Janeiro, Deize worked as a house cleaner until her music career became successful. Her song “Injeção” was used as the basis for the M.I.A. song "Bucky Done Gun". Recently she has performed both with M.I.A. and with another popular funk carioca singer, Tati Quebra Barraco.

== Career ==
While funk’s lyrics often focus on relationships and sex, and many male funk carioca artists commonly objectify women, Tigrona has received some criticism for some of her lyrics. Although she has a relatively low profile, her song "Injeção," which translates to the English word "injection," had some success, and includes the lyrics Quando eu vô ao médico, sinto uma dor / Quer me dar injeção...Injeção doi quando fura which roughly translate to "When I go to the doctor, I feel a pain / He wants to give me an injection... The injection hurts when it penetrates." "Injeção" is included in the Baile Funk compilation Slum Dunk Presents Funk Carioca compiled by Bruno Verner & Eliete Mejorado of post punk duo Tetine for British record label Mr Bongo. The song, which incorporates many other sexual metaphors, samples the horns from the theme of the Rocky films, "Gonna Fly Now." Alex Bellos has noted the key characteristics of this genre as "Coke. Guns. Booty. Beats." - the last two of these can certainly be heard in Tigrona's song. Funk carioca, when played in its typical, extremely loud, floor-shaking style, often has the effect of "going straight to the booty," says funk researcher Greg Scruggs.

Many of her songs, including “Sex-o-matic” and “Injeção”, blatantly discuss sex and woman in a way some other funk carioca performers, like Tati Quebra Barraco, consider offensive. Tigrona maintains that funk music is for dancing and that people find her double-entendres entertaining. Despite the criticism, Tigrona’s music is gradually becoming more popular to a wider audience, even beyond the streets of Brazil: she makes a guest appearance on British dance producer Greymatter's 2010 album, with the song "Eu Fomo".
