= Kala Tour =

2007 concert tour by M.I.A.

- Tour by M.I.A.
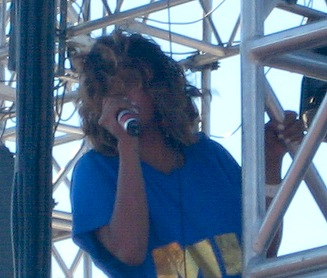
- M.I.A. performing at Treasure Island Music Festival, 2007
- Associated album: Kala (2007)
- Start date: 20 May 2007
- End date: 20 December 2007
- No. of shows: 21 in Europe; 37 in North America; 6 in Australia; 4 in Japan; 68 in total

M.I.A. concert chronology
- Arular Tour (2005); Kala Tour (2007); People vs. Money Tour (2008)

The Kala Tour is a 2007 global M.I.A. concert tour performed in support of her studio album Kala (see 2007 in music).

== Tour details ==
The tour features dates across Europe, North America, Canada and Asia. M.I.A. began performing in support of Kala at Radio 1's Big Weekend on 20 May 2007. She made sporadic appearances at venues in the US during late 2006, including performances at Gotham Hall in New York City on 31 August 2006 where other performing acts included Cee-lo and The Rapture, and at McCarren Pool on 3 September 2006 where other performers included Spank Rock and Amanda Blank. This tour followed recording for Kala, and the Arular Tour, which ended in February 2006 with performances in Japan. The 2007 Kala tour was announced by M.I.A. on her official website and Myspace page. The setlist featured songs heard for the first time from her studio album Kala (2007), and also included songs from previous album Arular (2005). Dates included concerts at music festivals, universities, colleges and club venues around the world.

=== Sets ===
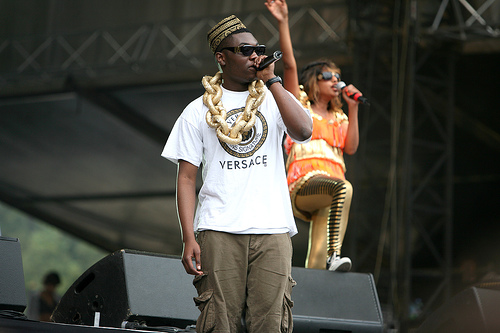
Afrikan Boy supporting M.I.A. at the Rock en Seine Festival, 2007

Concerts during the tour often began with political activist Koichi Toyama on a panoramic screen delivering an anarchic speech, ordering the overthrow of a government. The setlist often began with Kala's opening track "Bamboo Banga." M.I.A. selected programming, beats and videos during her set using a Lemur Input Device on stage, and performed dates with back up singer Cherry, DJs Sinden and Low B, supporting vocalists and backup dancers "The Coconut Twins" (Kesh and Zezi Ifore). On the back screen, disembodied images and film footage of break-dancing street kids, strippers, tigers, war, video games, political rhetoric, graphs, globes, laughing women and large concert crowds from her previous shows are played throughout the show. Fans were often invited on stage during the performance of "Bird Flu."

M.I.A. has collaborated with CassettePlaya, Ashish and Brian Lichtenberg and as with the Arular Tour she wore some of her own designs on tour. T-shirts such as the "How Many How Many" Tees from the "Boyz" set were sold as tour merchandise at gigs and via her website. "Kala Tour Tees" from her "Kala Tour/Okley Run" line were released in 2008.

=== Shows ===
M.I.A.'s date at the House of Blues in Chicago, US was performed with Lupe Fiasco and Emily King, whilst her dates at the Arena of Nîmes in France and at the Fox Theater in the US were performed opening for Björk. Her date at the Verizon Wireless Theatre was performed with Paul Wall. Although reports suggested that M.I.A was booked and subsequently cancelled an appearance at the Glastonbury Festival in 2007, a statement released by M.I.A.'s agents explained "Contrary to printed reports in the Guardian Guide, M.I.A. advised Glastonbury that she was unavailable to perform in late May. We are sorry if fans were led to believe otherwise. M.I.A. looks forward to performing next year.“

More dates were added to her US tour after September 2007 due to high demand. M.I.A. ended 2007 with a mini-tour of venues across the U.K. She and her label XL Recordings made available a tour diary of her late 2007 UK dates in different parts to view on YouTube. Opening acts throughout her tour included The Gray Kid, Rye Rye, Santigold, Holy Fuck, The Cool Kids, Soko, Radioclit, Buraka Som Sistema and Afrikan Boy. Her DJs also often played opening sets before her shows. On her YouTube account, M.I.A. posted a video of her and her tourmates during an encore performance of "Paper Planes" at the Electric Factory in Philadelphia, where she named the tour the "KALA Back 2 P.O.W.A. Tour."

The KALA tour ended in December 2007, with will.i.am, Paul Wall, the Beastie Boys, Nick Zinner and Brian Chase of the Yeah Yeah Yeahs and Pavement's Mark Ibold among attendees. It was followed by M.I.A.'s People vs. Money Tour in 2008.

== Set list ==
M.I.A. did not follow the same setlist at every show, but played combinations of the following songs. "Galang" and "Paper Planes" were variably chosen as the final song she played for the encore depending on the venue. During the Terminal 5 club performance, part of the CMJ Music Marathon, she performed mash ups of New Order's "Blue Monday" with "Jimmy", "10 Dollar" with the Eurythmics' "Sweet Dreams (Are Made of This)", (from the mixtape Piracy Funds Terrorism) and "Galang" with Lil Mama's "Lip Gloss". It was noted that the latter "served as a reminder of how much the mainstream pop/dance/rap landscape has shifted since M.I.A. first appeared in 2004, and how much certain megahits such as Fergie's "London Bridge" have come to resemble her sound."

- "Video Introduction"
- "Bamboo Banga"
- "World Town"
- "XR2"
- "Pull Up the People"
- "Fire Fire"
- "Sunshowers"
- "20 Dollar"
- "Hussel"
- "Jimmy"
- "10 Dollar"
- "U.R.A.Q.T."
- "Bucky Done Gun"
- "Birdflu"
- "Boyz"

Encore:

- "Paper Planes"
- "Galang"

== Tour dates ==
Date	City	Country	Venue
Europe
20 May 2007 (Note: This concert is a part of Radio 1's Big Weekend.)	Preston	England	Moor Park
North America
21 July 2007 (Note: This concert is a part of Siren Music Festival.)	Brooklyn	United States	Coney Island
25 July 2007	Brooklyn	United States	Studio B
28 July 2007	San Francisco	United States	Rickshaw Stop
30 July 2007	Los Angeles	United States	The Echo
31 July 2007	Los Angeles	United States	The Echo
3 August 2007 (Note: This concert is a part of Lollapalooza.)	Chicago	United States	Grant Park
4 August 2007	Chicago	United States	House of Blues
5 August 2007 (Note: This concert is a part of Virgin Festival.)	Baltimore	United States	Pimlico Race Course
Europe
13 August 2007 (Note: This concert is a part of Paredes de Coura Festival.)	Paredes de Coura	Portugal	Praia Fluvial do Taboão
16 August 2007 (Note: This concert is a part of Pukkelpop.)	Hasselt	Belgium	Kempischesteenweg
17 August 2007	Cologne	Germany	Gloria Theater
18 August 2007 (Note: This concert is a part of Lowlands.)	Biddinghuizen	Netherlands	Walibi Holland
21 August 2007 (Note: These concerts are part of Festival de Nîmes.)	Nimes	France	Arena of Nîmes
23 August 2007	Nimes	France	Arena of Nîmes
24 August 2007 (Note: This concert is a part of Rock en Seine.)	Paris	France	Parc de Saint-Cloud
26 August 2007 (Note: This concert is a part of Get Loaded in the Park.)	London	England	Clapham Common
1 September 2007 (Note: This concert is a part of Electric Picnic.)	Stradbally	Ireland	Stradbally Hall
2 September 2007 (Note: This concert is a part of Connect Festival.)	Inveraray	Scotland	Inveraray Castle
North America
8 September 2007 (Note: This concert is a part of Virgin Festival.)	Toronto	Canada	Toronto Islands Park
9 September 2007 (Note: This concert is a part of Osheaga Festival.)	Montreal	Canada	Parc Jean-Drapeau
11 September 2007	Detroit	United States	Fox Theatre
14 September 2007 (Note: This concert is a part of Austin City Limits Festival.)	Austin	United States	Zilker Park
15 September 2007 (Note: This concert is a part of Treasure Island Music Festival.)	San Francisco	United States	Treasure Island
Australia
22 September 2007 (Note: These concerts are part of Parklife.)	Melbourne	Australia	Birrarung Marr
23 September 2007	Adelaide	Australia	Botanic Park
28 September 2007	Melbourne	Australia	Forum Theatre
29 September 2007	Brisbane	Australia	City Botanic Gardens
30 September 2007	Sydney	Australia	Moore Park
1 October 2007	Perth	Australia	Wellington Square
Asia
5 October 2007	Nagoya	Japan	Nagoya Club Quattro
6 October 2007	Osaka	Japan	Shinsaibashi Club Quattro
8 October 2007	Tokyo	Japan	Shibuya Club Quattro
9 October 2007	Tokyo	Japan	Liquid Room
North America
18 October 2007	New York City	United States	Terminal 5
19 October 2007	New York City	United States	Terminal 5
20 October 2007	Toronto	Canada	Kool Haus
26 October 2007 (Note: This concert is a part of Voodoo Music + Arts Experience.)	New Orleans	United States	City Park
27 October 2007 (Note: This concert is a part of Vegoose.)	Las Vegas	United States	Sam Boyd Stadium
29 October 2007	Miami	United States	Studio A
31 October 2007	Atlanta	United States	Earthlink Live
2 November 2007	Houston	United States	Verizon Wireless Theater
3 November 2007	Austin	United States	Hogg Memorial Auditorium
4 November 2007	Dallas	United States	House of Blues
7 November 2007	San Francisco	United States	The Fillmore
8 November 2007	San Francisco	United States	Mezzanine
9 November 2007	Los Angeles	United States	Wiltern Theatre
11 November 2007	San Diego	United States	Canes Bar & Grill
14 November 2007	Vancouver	Canada	Commodore Ballroom
15 November 2007	Portland	United States	Roseland Theater
16 November 2007	Seattle	United States	Showbox SoDo
20 November 2007	Minneapolis	United States	First Avenue
21 November 2007	Chicago	United States	House of Blues
23 November 2007	Chicago	United States	The Vic Theatre
24 November 2007	Detroit	United States	Majestic Theater
26 November 2007	Montreal	Canada	Metropolis
29 November 2007	Washington, D.C.	United States	9:30 Club
1 December 2007	Philadelphia	United States	Electric Factory
Europe
8 December 2007	London	England	Institute of Contemporary Arts
10 December 2007	Birmingham	England	Custard Factory
11 December 2007	Newcastle	England	Digital
12 December 2007	Glasgow	Scotland	The Arches
14 December 2007	Brighton	England	Concorde 2
15 December 2007	Bristol	England	Anson Rooms
17 December 2007	Nottingham	England	Rescue Rooms
18 December 2007	Manchester	England	Manchester Academy
19 December 2007	Norwich	England	The Waterfront
20 December 2007	London	England	The Coronet
