= Bird Flu (song) =

Single by M.I.A.

from the album Kala
- Released: 23 November 2006
- Genre: Gaana; dance; experimental hip hop; dappankuthu
- Length: 3:23
- Label: XL Recordings
- Songwriters: Maya Arulpragasam; Ravindra Prasad Patnaik; Switch
- Producer: M.I.A.

M.I.A. singles chronology
"Bucky Done Gun" (2005)	"Bird Flu" (2006)	"Boyz" (2007)

Music video
- "Bird Flu" on YouTube

"Bird Flu" is a song by British recording artist M.I.A. from her second studio album Kala (2007). It was released on 23 November 2006 through XL Recordings and Interscope Records. Critics noted its autobiographical lyrics "updated to the present day, where she's straddling the line between major-label success and her own crazy-ass major-label-bucking tendencies, singing she's too cool "to be a Rocawear model," adding that she could not be a "rocker on a label" because her "beats were too evil." Also praised was the song's utilization of the folk urumee melam/gaana and dappankuthu music, Tamil genres of music that the writer was familiar with having grown up in Jaffna.

Arulpragasam recorded the song using live drummers from temples in Chennai. M.I.A. wanted to work with Tamil folk music as it gave her a sense of rhythm as a child and she wanted to draw certain aspects from Indian music that Western audiences had not heard before.

== Composition ==
"Bird Flu" incorporates elements of the song "Thirvizha Nu Vantha" from the Indian Tamil language film Jayam.

== Music video ==
The music video was produced and directed by M.I.A. and a few creative consultants. It was shown at the 2008 San Francisco International Asian American Film Festival in the "Music Video Asia 2008" category. M.I.A. talked about the filming location for Bird Flu and how it had a personal connection for her: Where we shot the ‘Bird Flu’ video...it was really close to the refugee camp where all the Sri Lankans get off the boat in India in the south, just outside Chennai. I went to this press office from 1986 or something, and found all these pictures of the refugees and stuff. I didn’t find pictures of us but I found pictures of my dad. Clothes were made for the "Bird Flu" project with Carri Mundane who with M.I.A., Steve Loveridge, and Sugu Arulpragasam, moved to Tamil Nadu during the shoot. Dancers were filmed auditioning for the video, which were posted on her YouTube account. She chose the boy featured in the video for inventing her the Bird Flu dance, saying he "can out dance anything I've ever seen."

== Release and reception ==
It was released as a downloadable single and video on iTunes on 23 November 2006, despite M.I.A. not considering this song to be the album's first official single. It was first mentioned in M.I.A.'s MySpace blog on 18 August 2006. M.I.A. posted the video for this track on her MySpace on 5 February 2007.

"Bird Flu" has been remixed by Cavemen. This song is featured in the video game FIFA Street 3 and was featured in the Japanese CGI anime film Vexille. Kitty Empire in The Observer and Jody Rosen in Slate.com named it the best song of 2007, with the latter appreciating the "clobbering" urumee symphony of the song complementing the "thick, buzzy and exciting beats" of much of Kala that was likened to "a post colonial studies seminar". The folktronica artist Patrick Wolf and experimental band Fuck Buttons cited the song as a favourite with Andrew Hung of the band commenting "She's got experimental tendencies but it's really popular at the same time. It's quite admirable in that sort of way. I love it."

M.I.A. often requested fans to dance with her on stage when "Bird Flu" was played in concerts during the KALA Tour in 2007 and the People Vs. Money Tour in 2008.
