= Dappankuthu =

Music genre and type of dance

Dappan Kuthu
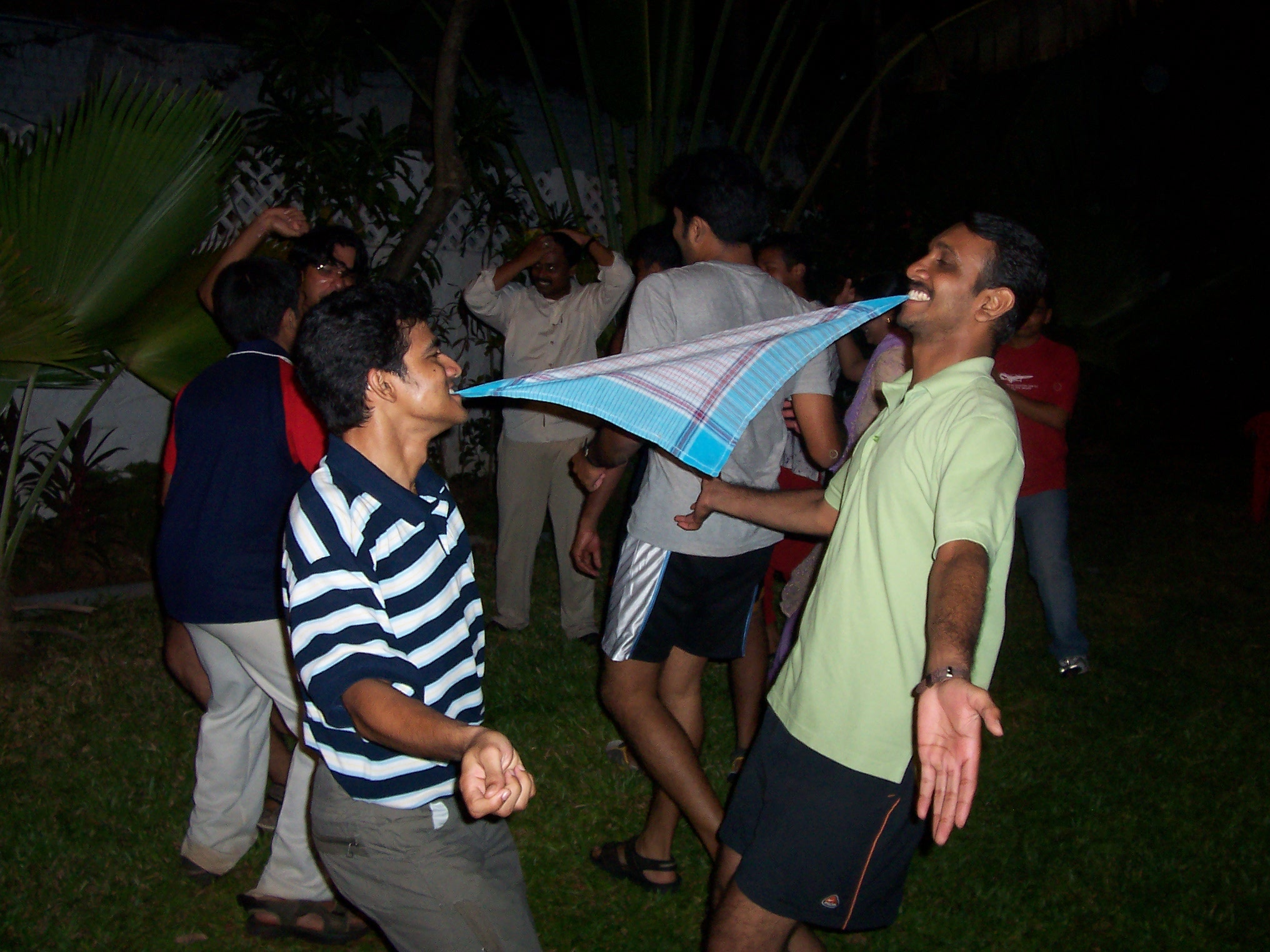
- A typical Dappankuthu move
- Other names: Dappan Kuthu; Kuthu
- Stylistic origins: Tamil dance, Dance forms of Tamil Nadu
- Cultural origins: Tamil Nadu

Dappankuthu (or simply Kuthu; /dəpɑːŋkuθu/) is a folk dance and music genre, that is typically danced to the Gaana music genre or Kuthu Beats with an emphasis on percussion performed in the South Indian state of Tamil Nadu. It is one of several popular genres employed in film music, mainly in Tamil cinema and other South Indian films, filmed and produced by people of Tamil culture. Unlike classical Indian dances such as bharatanatyam or kathakali, dappankuthu is relatively informal in that it has no structured, repeated steps and dancers do not learn through formal dance classes. It shares its emphasis on percussion with older folk dances of Tamil Nadu, such as kummi and kolattam.

== Musical instruments ==
A percussion instrument called parai in Tamil, without the jingles, is often used for dappankuthu or similar dance forms. Unlike normal tambourines, this requires a wooden stick to play. Telugu teenmaar uses daf drums, associated there with Siddi people. The urumee drum is also often used. A customised trumpet (called Nadaswaram locally) is also sometimes employed. The rhythm of the dappankuthu is often signified by a mix of beat patterns layered and flowing into one another. Other percussion instruments may be employed in dappankuthu. A similar instrument called TamaTe in Kannada resembling a Ganesh tambourine is also used for such dance forms in border areas such as M.M. Hills. The most-used time signature for dappankuthu songs is 6/8.

== Outfit and embellishments ==
Even though any attire can be worn when one dances the dappankuthu, a lungi (colourful cloth wrapped around the waist) is commonly worn and most preferable, with the bottom raised and folded upwards over the knees in the middle. Ideally, it should be worn over pattapatti (lined trousers). The shirt worn would have only two or three buttons in place, while the chest portion is left wide open and at the lower part of the shirt is knotted (using the two portions of the shirt). It is also common to tie a handkerchief or bandana around one's forehead and/or wrist.

Loud clapping and whistling by spectators often accompany the dappankuthu dance. Spectators are also known to set off firecrackers called locally as "Pattaasu" on the ground during the performance.

Facial expressions are employed for effect by the dancers. For example, the tongue, folded over and held in position with the front teeth, is brought out at regular intervals.

In Male Mahadeshwara hills of Karnataka bordering Tamil Nadu, the music for this dance will be played for money, and the believers can dance for longer time. Particularly in this hill, there is a saying that god feels happy if his believers dance for him.

== Kuthu pop ==
The genre has been a staple of Tamil cinema, with the composer Ilaiyaraaja credited with popularising kuthu and other folk music in 70s cinema scores. Early on, the composers incorporated kuthu rhythms (and instruments) as a brief element to otherwise "classical" songs. Cinema is also responsible for incorporating singing into the instrumental genre of dappankuthu, with the trend flourishing in 2000s and giving birth to the modern kuthu pop.

== Global attention ==
Kuthu has combined with street styles and incorporated with hip hop culture, most noticeably when infused in the songs "Boyz" and "Bird Flu" by M.I.A. on her 2007 album Kala. Indian choreographers all over the world combine Kuthu with street styles. Travis Scott incorporated Kuthu drums on the song “SIRENS” from his 2023 album Utopia.
