= People vs. Money Tour =

2008 concert tour by M.I.A.

- Tour by M.I.A.
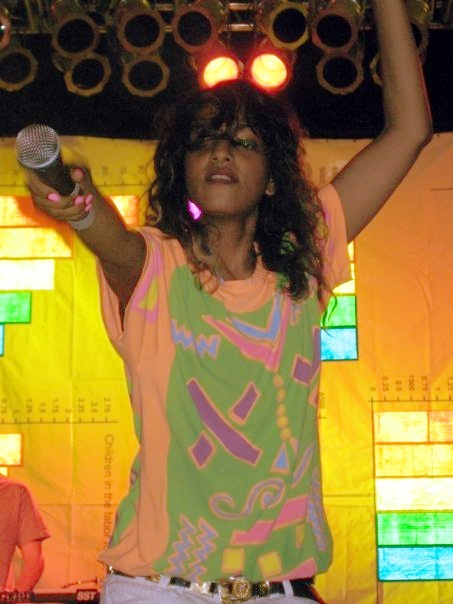
- M.I.A. performing at Bonnaroo festival, 2008
- Associated album: Kala (2007)
- Start date: 1 March 2008
- End date: 13 June 2008
- Legs: 1
- No. of shows: 2 in Mexico; 27 in United States; 29 in total

M.I.A. concert chronology
- Kala Tour (2007); People Vs. Money Tour (2008); Maya Tour (2010/2011)

The People vs. Money Tour was a 2008 concert tour by M.I.A. in support of her studio album Kala. Concerts also featured songs from her debut album Arular. It began on 26 April 2008 and ended on 13 June in Manchester, Tennessee. The tour featured dates in Central America, the US and Canada. Her 2008 dates began with two performances at the MX Beat festival in Monterrey, Mexico in March, following the end of her Kala Tour. M.I.A. later cancelled the European dates of the tour, which ended at the Bonnaroo Music Festival in Manchester, Tennessee on 13 June 2008.

== Tour details ==
The 2008 tour was announced by M.I.A. in April 2008 via her Myspace and official website. A continuation of the Kala Tour, dates included concerts at music festivals, universities and club venues. The set consisted of M.I.A., backup singer Cherry, DJs Low Budget and in other concerts Million Dollar Mano, dancers and supporting vocalists. M.I.A.'s DJs also perform opening sets before her shows. She met backup dancer Cisko after viewing videos of his dances on YouTube.

Holy Fuck opened for M.I.A. from 26 April – 12 May 2008. Egyptian Lover supported M.I.A. on a few dates during the tour, as well as Rye Rye who, along with MGMT, opened for M.I.A. on 11 April 2008.

Continuing with a similar set to her KALA Tour concerts during 2007, M.I.A. selects programming, beats and videos using a Lemur Input Device. A panoramic back screen features film footage of Koichi Toyama's speech, break-dancing street kids, strippers, tigers, war, video games, political rhetoric, graphs, globes, laughing women, animated graphics of M.I.A. performing and large concert crowds from her previous shows, images of her artwork and holographic patterns.

=== Shows ===
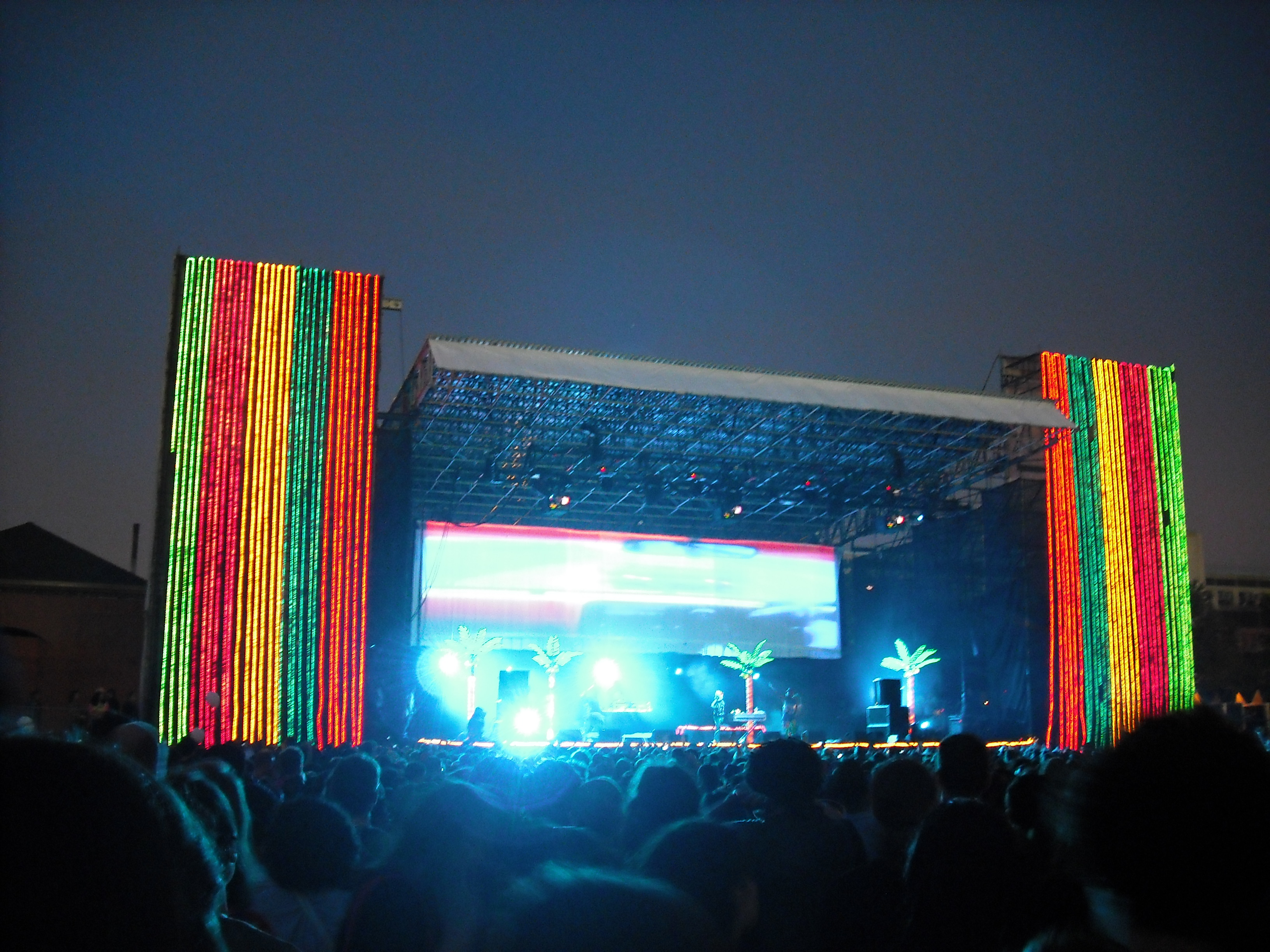
M.I.A.'s McCarren Park concert in June 2008

The setlist featured songs from both her studio albums Arular (2005) and Kala (2007), although M.I.A. did not perform the same setlist at every concert. The set often began with Kala's opening track, "Bamboo Banga." M.I.A. performed at the final date of the 2008 MX Beat festival in Toluca. Prior to her Coachella festival appearance in April 2008, M.I.A. filmed from her New York apartment window and posted on YouTube an incident involving a black man being apprehended by white police officers, which elicited commentary debating the force used for the arrest. At the show, she sang a segment from The Verve's "The Drugs Don't Work", changing the lyrics to "The cops don't work, they make things worse, but I know I'll see your face again," after police tried to shut the set down. Stating "They were on the backside of the stage and they were trying to shut me down...I was really thinking about the situation in New York", referencing the Sean Bell shooting incident, she felt "getting people to be interactive makes me feel more and more connected to my fans."

In May 2008, she stated in an interview "I figured I might as well do a few more shows in America before I may not be allowed back in or ever get a chance to come back again – It's nice to tour around America and do every gig like it's your last gig."

M.I.A. performed additional dates during her tour. On 3 May 2008 she performed at the JazzFest in New Orleans, U.S., and at an afterparty for the MTV Movie Awards in West Hollywood, California, U.S. on 1 June 2008. At the show, Arulpragasam pledged, with the money she earned from the gig, to build new schools in Liberia, telling the crowd "It costs $52,000 to build a school in Liberia for 1000". Updates on the building progress have been posted on her MySpace blog. She also performed at the Museum of Modern Art in New York City, U.S. in June 2008, during which Mos Def performed with her onstage. Other performers there included past tour mates LCD Soundsystem. Proceeds from the event were donated towards benefitting the museum's general operating fund. Arulpragasam announced her engagement at her Edmonton Events Centre concert in Canada. Curating his first ever New American Music Union in August 2008, Anthony Kiedis of the Red Hot Chili Peppers described in an interview in May being very keen on Arulpragasam playing at the US festival, remarking "I think she's a rocking live performer. She wanted to play, she was very into it" but that she cancelled as she was getting married.

Kat Bjelland, Kim Gordon and Susan Sarandon were among concert attendees.

=== Clothes ===
Clothes worn during this tour were inspired by prints and artwork Arulpragasam created for her websites, her album cover for Kala and songs such as "Bird Flu", and were taken from her clothing line. In 2008, she launched a limited edition fashion line held to reflect her personal style. The limited edition "KALA Tour/Okley Run" line included Mexican and Afrika jackets and leggings, Islamic hoodies as well as tour-inspired designs including "People Vs. Money Tour Tees" and "KALA Tour Tees". In some concerts, she wore T-shirts imprinted with images of artists such as Ian Curtis. Short-shorts, head bandannas, neon, retro stripes and sequin-clad attendees populated her Aragon ballroom performance in Chicago, with Althea Legaspi of the Chicago Tribune noting that "If her fans' clothing is any indication, M.I.A.'s cultural influence – with her flair for outrageous fashion – may be growing beyond her music. Fortunately, Friday's performance showed her showmanship has improved along with her popularity."

== Set list ==
Below is the set list of Arulpragasam's concert at the Maplewood Myth. Throughout the People Vs. Money Tour, she played various combinations of these songs.

- "Video Introduction"
- "Bamboo Banga"
- "World Town"
- "XR2"
- "Pull Up the People"
- "Sunshowers"
- "20 Dollar"

All Girls Went Up on Stage

- "10 Dollar"
- "Jimmy"

All Boys Went Up on Stage

- "Boyz"
- "Bucky Done Gun"
- "Galang"

Encore

- "Birdflu"
- "Paper Planes"
- "Amazon", "U.R.A.Q.T." and "Banana Skit" were performed at select shows.

== Tour dates ==
| Date | City | Country | Venue |
|---|---|---|---|
| March 1, 2008 (Note: This concert is a part of MX Beat Soundfest.) | Monterrey | Mexico | Deportivo Bancario |
| March 8, 2008 (Note: This concert is a part of MX Beat Soundfest.) | Toluca | Mexico | Centro Dinámico Pegaso |
| April 10, 2008 | South Hadley | United States | Mount Holyoke College |
| April 11, 2008 | Poughkeepsie | United States | Vassar College |
| April 12, 2008 | Providence | United States | Brown University |
| April 26, 2008 (Note: This concert is a part of Coachella.) | Indio | United States | Empire Polo Club |
| April 28, 2008 | San Diego | United States | 4th & B |
| May 1, 2008 | Austin | United States | La Zona Rosa |
| May 2, 2008 | Dallas | United States | South Side Ballroom |
| May 5, 2008 | Nashville | United States | City Hall |
| May 8, 2008 | Detroit | United States | Fillmore Detroit |
| May 9, 2008 | Chicago | United States | Aragon Ballroom |
| May 12, 2008 | Milwaukee | United States | Turner Hall |
| May 13, 2008 | Maplewood | United States | Myth |
| May 14, 2008 | Lawrence | United States | Liberty Hall |
| May 17, 2008 | Denver, Colorado | United States | Fillmore Auditorium |
| May 18, 2008 | Salt Lake City | United States | The Depot |
| May 21, 2008 | San Francisco | United States | Music Concourse |
| May 23, 2008 | Portland | United States | Roseland Theater |
| May 24, 2008 (Note: This concert is a part of Sasquatch! Music Festival.) | Gorge | United States | The Gorge Amphitheatre |
| May 25, 2008 | Vancouver | Canada | PNE Forum |
| May 27, 2008 | Edmonton | Canada | Edmonton Events Centre |
| May 28, 2008 | Calgary | Canada | MacEwan Hall |
| May 30, 2008 | Winnipeg | Canada | Burton Cummings Theatre |
| June 2, 2008 | Toronto | Canada | Sound Academy |
| June 3, 2008 | Montreal | Canada | Metropolis |
| June 5, 2008 | Philadelphia | United States | Philadelphia Armory |
| June 6, 2008 | New York City | United States | McCarren Pool |
| June 13, 2008 (Note: This concert is a part of Bonnaroo Music Festival.) | Manchester | United States | Great Stage Park |

== Cancelled dates ==
| Date | City | Country | Venue |
|---|---|---|---|
Europe
| 21 June 2008 | Barcelona | Spain | Sonar by Night Festival |
| 24 June 2008 | Arendal | Norway | Hove Festival |
| 27 June 2008 | Dublin | Ireland | RedBox |
| 1 July 2008 | London | United Kingdom | The Roundhouse |
| 4 July 2008 | Roskilde | Denmark | Roskilde Festival |
| 5 July 2008 | Arvika | Sweden | Arvika Festival |
| 6 July 2008 | Gdynia | Poland | Heiniken Open'er Festival |
| 8 July 2008 | Montreux | Switzerland | Montreux Jazz Festival |
| 10 July 2008 | Novi Sad | Serbia | Exit Festival |
| 11 July 2008 | Leipzig | Germany | Splash! Festival |
| 12 July 2008 | Liège | Belgium | Les Ardentes |
| 16 July 2008 | Porto | Portugal | Casa da Música |
| 19 July 2008 | Madrid | Spain | Summercase |
| 20 July 2008 | Southwold | United Kingdom | Latitude Festival |
