= Afrikan Boy =

Nigerian-born British rapper (born 1989)

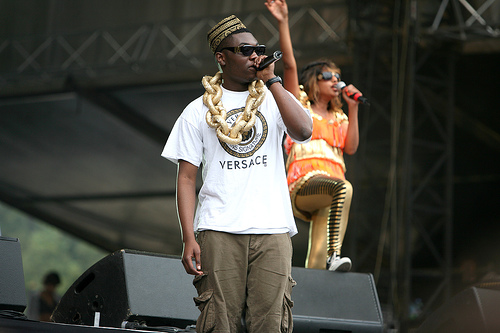
- Afrikan Boy supporting M.I.A. at the 2007 Rock en Seine Festival in Paris, France

Background information
- Also known as: Afrikan Boy
- Born: Olushola Oluwaseun Ajose; 28 March 1989 (age 37)
- Origin: Nigeria
- Genres: Hip hop, grime, comedy hip hop
- Occupation: Rapper
- Years active: 2000s-present
- Label: Yam Records
- Website: afrikanboy.com

Olushola Oluwaseun Ajose, better known by his stage name Afrikan Boy (born 28 March 1989), is a Nigerian-born grime artist from the Woolwich district of London. He went viral with a track entitled "One day I went to Lidl", recorded at That SP Studios.

== Career ==
Ajose made a guest appearance on the track "Hussel" from the M.I.A. album Kala, and is one of the initial artists M.I.A. wanted signed to her label N.E.E.T. Recordings (then called Zig-Zag) in 2007. A remix of M.I.A.'s "Paper Planes" was uploaded onto her MySpace featuring Afrikan Boy and tourmate Rye Rye. Afrikan Boy has never appeared on pirate radio, a performance opportunity common in the grime genre. He studied for a Psychology degree at Brunel University.

Touring in support of M.I.A. on her 2007 KALA Tour and 2008 People Vs. Money Tour as well as headlining his own shows, Ajose has appeared at the Splash! festival. On 26 June 2011, he released his mixtape named "What Took You So Long" on his website for free. On 18 August 2014, he released his LP The ABCD on Yam Records.

Ajose also contributed to the work of DJ Shadow and Africa Express alongside Baaba Maal, Femi Kuti, Damon Albarn and Fatoumata Diawara. His song "Hit Em Up" also featured on the soundtrack for the 2016 video game Forza Horizon 3.
