= How Many Votes Fix Mix =

How Many Votes Fix Mix EP

EP by M.I.A.
- Released: 28 October 2008
- Genre: Electronic; urumee melam; gaana; soca
- Label: XL; Interscope

M.I.A. chronology
Paper Planes - Homeland Security Remixes EP (2008)	How Many Votes Fix Mix EP (2008)

Professional ratings
Review scores
Source	Rating
The A.V. Club	(B+)

How Many Votes Fix Mix is the second EP released in 2008 by the musician M.I.A. (see 2008 in music). It was released on October 28, 2008 by XL Recordings/Interscope Records and made available on iTunes. It received a full release on November 4, 2008. A previously unheard track "Shells" was released with a remix of "Boyz" with Jay-Z and "Far Far", a bonus track from M.I.A.'s second album Kala.

== Track listing ==
Credits adapted from the liner notes of the expanded edition of Kala.

How Many Votes Fix Mix track listing
No.	Title	Writer(s)	Producer(s)	Length
1.	"Boyz" (featuring Jay Z)	Maya Arulpragasam; Dave Taylor; Shawn Carter	M.I.A.; Switch	4:16
2.	"Shells"	Arulpragasam	M.I.A.; Diplo	2:48
3.	"Far Far"	Arulpragasam; Taylor	M.I.A.; Switch	3:25
Total length:				10:29
