= Kala (album) =

Studio album by M.I.A.
- Released: 8 August 2007
- Recorded: 2006–2007
- Genres: Dance; world; hip hop; pop
- Length: 47:32
- Labels: XL; Interscope
- Producers: Blaqstarr; Diplo; M.I.A.; Morganics; Switch; Timbaland

M.I.A. chronology
Arular (2005)	Kala (2007)	Maya (2010)

Singles from Kala
- 1. "Bird Flu" Released: 23 November 2006; 2. "Boyz" Released: 11 June 2007; 3. "Jimmy" Released: 1 October 2007; 4. "Paper Planes" Released: 11 February 2008

Kala is the second studio album by English recording artist M.I.A. It was released on 8 August 2007 through XL Recordings. M.I.A. named the album after her mother and has stated that her mother's struggles in life are a major theme of the album. It was mainly written and produced by M.I.A. and Switch, and features contributions from Timbaland, Diplo, Afrikan Boy and The Wilcannia Mob.

Initially planning to work with American producer Timbaland for the bulk of the album, M.I.A. was unable to gain a long-term work visa to enter the US. Therefore, she recorded Kala in numerous countries around the world, including India, Angola, Trinidad, Liberia, Jamaica and Australia. M.I.A. and Switch relied heavily on the digital audio workstation Logic Pro and recorded additional vocals and background sounds outside the studio environment. Kala incorporates prominent influences from South Asian music, featuring samples of Bollywood and Tamil cinema. The album draws on various styles, from funk carioca to African folk. The songs are about political themes related to the Third World, including illegal immigration, poverty and capitalism.

Kala was the best-performing album on the US Billboard Electronic Albums chart of 2007, and was certified gold by the RIAA for selling 500,000 copies in the US. It was certified platinum in Canada and gold in the UK. It spawned the singles "Bird Flu", "Boyz", "Jimmy" and "Paper Planes", the latter of which received a Grammy nomination for Record of the Year at the 2009 Grammy Awards.

The album received widespread critical acclaim and was ranked as one of the best albums of 2007 by many publications. Since its initial release, it has been included in several greatest albums lists. Renowned music critic Robert Christgau remarked that the album is his favourite of the 21st century.

== Composition and recording ==
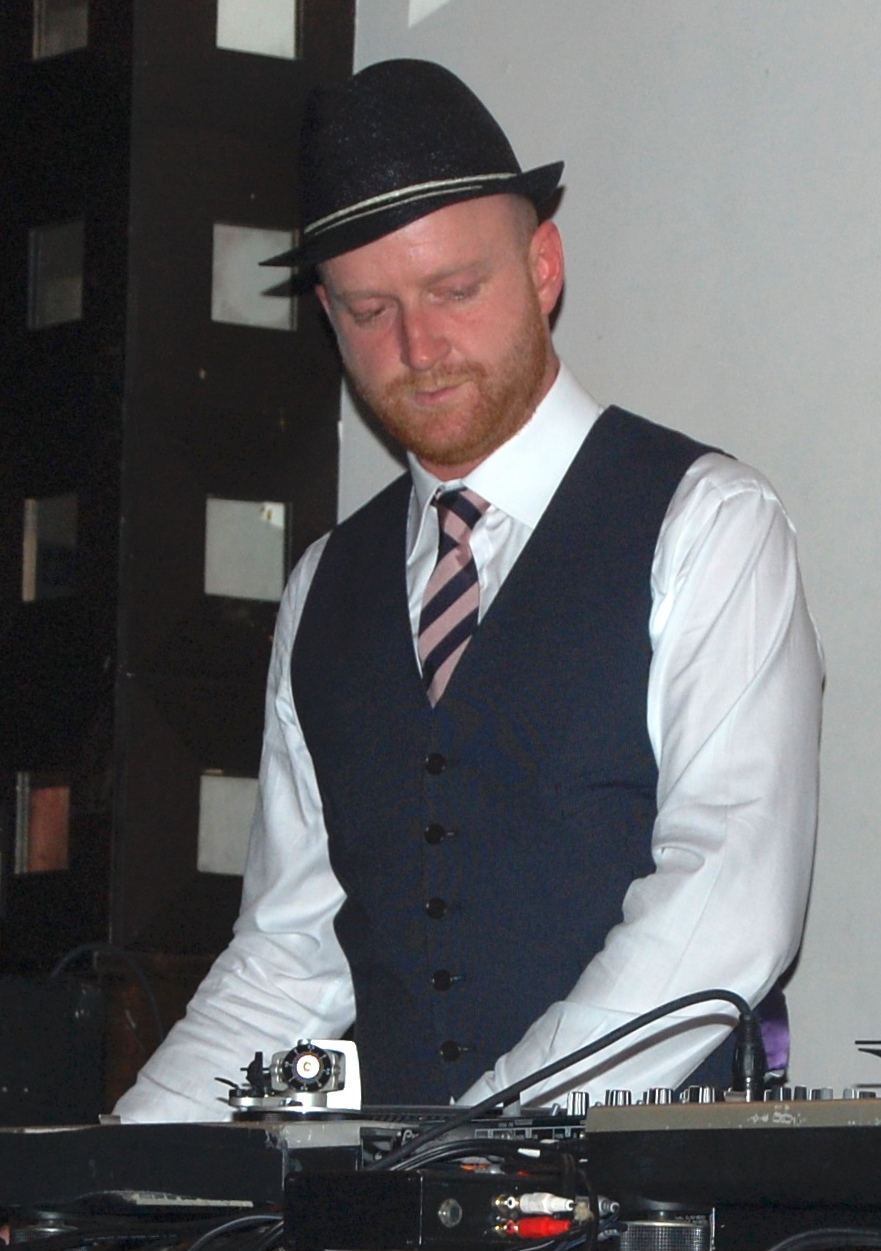
Dave "Switch" Taylor, who co-wrote and co-produced Kala

M.I.A. (Mathangi "Maya" Arulpragasam) had released her debut album Arular in 2005, which achieved critical acclaim and sold 130,000 copies. Plans for a second album were first revealed when she spoke later that year of her intention to work with American producer Timbaland. At one point it was anticipated that he would produce the bulk of the album. However, she was unable to gain a long-term work visa to enter the US, reportedly due to her family's connections with guerrillas in Sri Lanka. This led to conflicts between the two artists' schedules and meant that Timbaland's involvement was restricted to a poorly received guest verse on the track "Come Around". M.I.A. instead opted to record the album at a variety of locations around the world, beginning by travelling to India following the last date of her Arular Tour in Japan in February 2006.

M.I.A. "Bird Flu" (2007)
Short clip of "Bird Flu" showing the track's use of urumee drums.

She initially travelled to India to meet A. R. Rahman, but found it hard to communicate her ideas to him and the planned musical collaboration did not take place. Rahman did, however, provide M.I.A. with a number of contacts and allow her to use his studio, where 22 members of drumming group The Tapes were recorded for Kala. Producer Switch, who had initially travelled to India purely to engineer the planned sessions, ultimately became involved in the composition of several tracks for the album. A visit to Angola to work with DJ Znobia was cancelled after Znobia was involved in a car accident, but M.I.A. was able to record in Trinidad, Liberia, Jamaica and Australia. She and Switch relied heavily on Logic Pro, a digital audio workstation produced by Apple, and were able to capture vocals and background sounds outside the traditional studio environment, using a microphone and a MacBook Pro. The album features guest vocals from Afrikan Boy, The Wilcannia Mob, and Timbaland, and further collaborations with Switch, Blaqstarr, Morganics and Diplo. She likened the process of recording the album to "making a big old marble cake with lots of different countries and influences. Then you slice it up and call each slice a song".

== Music and lyrics ==
Kala is named after M.I.A.'s mother, in contrast to her previous album, Arular, which was named after her father. She contends that Arular was a "masculine" album, but that Kala "is about my mum and her struggle—how do you work, feed your children, nurture them and give them the power of information". She further summed the album up as "shapes, colours, Africa, street, power, bitch, nu world, and brave". The album is musically more aggressive and sample-heavy than M.I.A.'s debut album, and features a range of musical styles, including dance music and makes extensive use of South Asian music such as that of the urumee, a drum used in gaana music native to Tamil Nadu, India, and features samples of Bollywood and Tamil cinema vocals. Like Arular, the album also draws heavy influence from funk carioca, while M.I.A. makes use of featuring African chanting and the indigenous Australian instrument the didgeridoo for the first time. Topics on the album are Third World themed, including illegal immigration, poverty, capitalism, violence, and the availability of guns in Africa, while also touching on facets of urban British Culture like rave culture.

According to Dominic Horner of The Independent, the album's music may not be appropriately described exclusively as either dance or world music, but it is a mixture of the two. Music critic Robert Christgau characterised its music as an "eclectic world-underclass dance amalgam", and Jonathan Brown of the Irish Independent cited Kala as a proper introduction to "world fusion", a genre that "blends sounds from across the globe which wouldn't – and some say shouldn't – be put together". By contrast, NPR's Oliver Wang argued that, rather than a "so-called world music fusion" attempt, Kala is "agitated, propulsive pop" informed by international sounds. Pitchfork likewise described the album as a pop record, stating: "But for every fantasy pop triumph on Kala, there's a hidden door or three." Music journalist Jody Rosen called it "an agitprop dance record" that reappropriates hip hop in an international setting with beatbox riddims, "playground" rhymes, unconventional samples, and gunshot sounds.

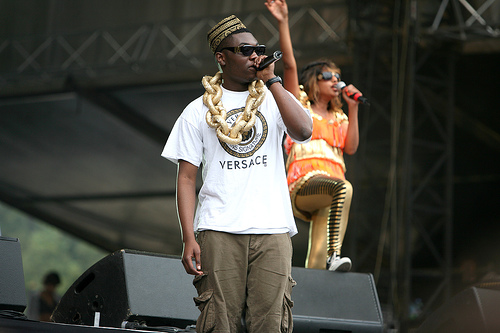
Afrikan Boy performing live with M.I.A. in France. He provided vocals for the track "Hussel".

The tracks "Boyz" and "Bird Flu" use urumee drums, a signature instrument of Gaana, a Tamil genre of music, with which M.I.A. was familiar from her time spent living in Sri Lanka. She later worked on these tracks in Trinidad, where she absorbed influences from the country's love of soca music. The lyrics of "Boyz" deal with the artist's time in Jamaica, and reference Jamaican dance moves. The song "Hussel" began as an image in M.I.A.'s head of refugees being smuggled in boats, which she expressed musically by imagining how "if they banged that beat on the side of a boat, what would it sound like? That's why it's all echo-y and submarine-y". The sounds on the intro were recorded from Keralan [sic] fishermen chanting as they pull their fishing boats into the water. "World Town" used instrumentation from the temple music she recalled waking up to as a child in Sri Lanka. After playing the track to children in Liberia, she expressed a desire to record a video for the song there. M.I.A.'s "flat, unaffected vocals and delivery of lyrics" on some songs drew comparisons to British post-punk bands such as Delta 5 and The Slits. She says it "was just what was happening to me naturally ... I wanted it to be difficult and raw and not get into it so much".

M.I.A. described opening track "Bamboo Banga" as having a "bamboo-stick beat, house-y feel". Afrikan Boy, an exponent of grime, a UK-based genre of urban music, provided vocals on the song "Hussel". M.I.A. opted to work with him because she felt he seemed comfortable with his identity as a "real immigrant" and because his background was different to that of most MCs in the genre. She had originally planned to include "Mango Pickle Down River"—her remix of The Wilcannia Mob's song "Down River"—on a mixtape, but chose to include it on the album because she felt it was rare to hear the "aboriginal voice" in recorded music. "Jimmy" is a tribute to her mother and is M.I.A.'s version of an old Bollywood film track to which she danced at parties as a child. Despite the involvement of Baltimore club musician Blaqstarr, "The Turn" is the album's only ballad, and the track has been described as the least like club music. "20 Dollar" was written about the relative ease of buying AK-47s in war-torn Liberia. "XR2" recalls part of M.I.A.'s life growing up with rave music in early 1990s London, while "Paper Planes" jokingly plays on her problems with visas and certain perceptions of immigrants.

== Release and artwork ==
In April 2007 Rolling Stone reported that Kala would be released on 26 June of that year. After being delayed for unknown reasons, the album was eventually released by XL Recordings on 8 August 2007 in Japan and on 20 August in the UK, and by Interscope Records on 21 August in the United States. The Japanese edition featured three extra tracks not included on the versions released in other countries, with "Far Far" shortly being re-released on the How Many Votes Fix Mix EP. Following the unexpected commercial success of "Paper Planes", Kala was re-issued in the United Kingdom in October 2008. A 4 November 2008 US re-release was announced, but as of late 2009 the album had not been re-issued in the United States.

The album's packaging includes photographs taken by M.I.A. and others in Liberia and Jamaica. The cover artwork to Kala, designed by Steve Loveridge, features neon fractal patterns and repeated slogans, including "Fight On! Fight On! Fight On!", which surrounds her image on the front cover. The cover was considered garish, prompting The Village Voice to comment "Maybe one day [she'll] make an album cover that it doesn't hurt to look at". Additional graphics for the album were provided by English fashion designer Carri Mundane (also known as Cassette Playa) and Steve Loveridge. The album's artwork was inspired by African art, "from dictator fashion to old stickers on the back of cars," which M.I.A hoped, like her artwork extended "Okley Run" clothing range, would capture "a 3-D sense, the shapes, the prints, the sound, film, technology, politics, economics" of a certain time.

== Promotion ==
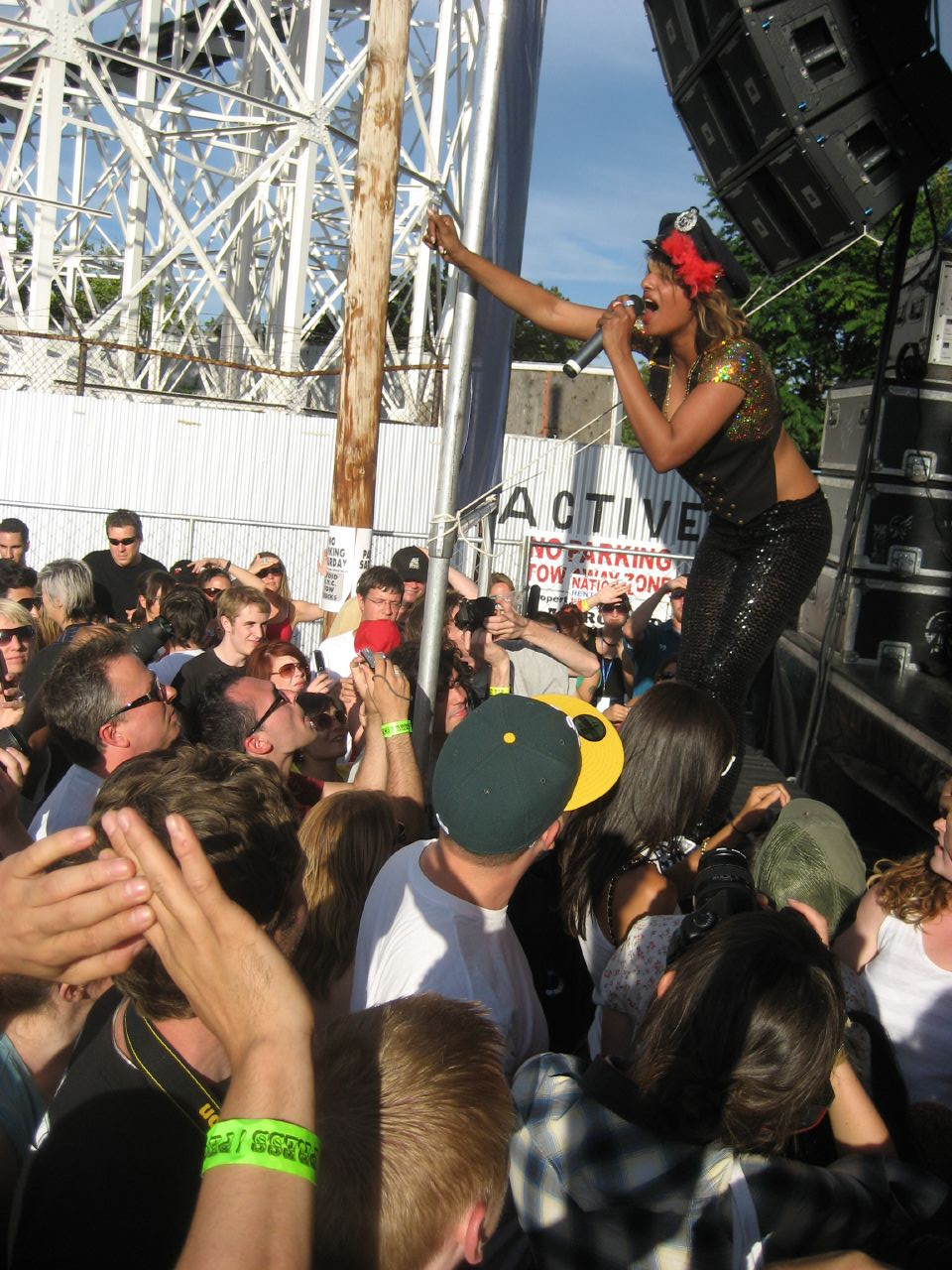
M.I.A. performing at the Siren Music Festival during her tour in support of the album

M.I.A. began her promotion of the new album with a live appearance at Radio 1's Big Weekend in Preston in May 2007, where she performed six songs from Kala. In July she began the full KALA Tour with dates in the United States before going on to play a number of festivals in Europe and America. After dates in Asia, she returned to America for a series of shows in October and November, before ending the year with concerts in the UK. The tour continued during the first half of 2008 under the banner of the People Vs. Money Tour with further dates in North America, although the planned European leg of the tour was eventually cancelled.

The first track from the album to be made available to the public was "Bird Flu", which was made available digitally as a promotional single on 13 November 2006. The first official single to be lifted from the album, "Boyz", was released on 11 June 2007. The second single was "Jimmy", which was released on 1 October 2007. The EP Paper Planes - Homeland Security Remixes EP, featuring various mixes of "Paper Planes", was released digitally on 11 February 2008 and physically three weeks later. A new physical single version was released in the UK on 13 October 2008. Also in October 2008, How Many Votes Fix Mix EP was released, containing a remix of "Boyz" with Jay-Z and the tracks "Shells" and "Far Far".

== Critical reception ==
Professional ratings
Aggregate scores
Source	Rating
Metacritic	87/100
Review scores
Source	Rating
AllMusic	5/5 stars
Entertainment Weekly	B
The Guardian	4/5 stars
The Independent	4/5 stars
Los Angeles Times	4/4 stars
MSN Music (Consumer Guide)	A+
NME	8/10
Pitchfork	8.9/10
Rolling Stone	4.5/5 stars
Spin	4.5/5 stars

Kala was met with widespread critical acclaim. At Metacritic, which assigns a normalised rating out of 100 to reviews from mainstream publications, the album received an average score of 87, based on 37 reviews.

Reviewing for the Los Angeles Times, Ann Powers wrote that Kala succeeded at embodying disenfranchised characters in the dissonant Third World with "truly multi-vocal" music whose "every sound signified something different, driving the music's meaning into some new corner". Andy Battaglia from The A.V. Club said the music ventured far enough where it served as both a party album and a progressive aural assault, while AllMusic's Andy Kellman felt that Kala was better for intensifying Arular's qualities and "mixing cultures with respectful irreverence". Barry Walters of Spin credited M.I.A. with evoking both the social demands and percussive sounds of the Third World, while finding the album relevant at a time when "more Americans than ever feel like outsiders in their own country". Writing for MSN Music, Robert Christgau said the lyrics were "cannier politically" than Arular, and the music was more decisive in embodying the imagination and recreation of "an unbowed international underclass that proves how smart it is just by stating its business, which includes taking your money". He later said that he had "pressed" the editors of Rolling Stone to let him give Kala four-and-a-half stars in his review for the magazine, wishing he "had the foresight to fight for five" because the album "kept growing on me till I even dug the Timbaland remnant ['Come Around']".

Jonathan Keefe from Slant Magazine was somewhat less impressed, deeming Kala less successful than Arular, which he said had more immediate hooks and clever pop sensibility. Writing for Pitchfork, Mark Pytlik described Kala as "clattering, buzzy, and sonically audacious", but said that, because most of M.I.A.'s lyrics gave the impression they were written "in the service of the rhythms", her allusions sounded more "rewarding" than what she literally had written. Andy Gill of The Independent found her lyrics unclear in their message about money and social concerns, while remarking that the gun references on "World Town" and "Paper Planes" blemished "an otherwise fine album". In The Guardian, Alexis Petridis wrote that Kala was still a "unique" listen in spite of occasionally tuneless songs. Writing for NME, Alex Miller acknowledged that the record's music polarised opinion, claiming that some members of the magazine's staff had "fed several copies [of the album] into the shredder claiming aural abuse", although others went on to praise the album for its innovation and referred to it as M.I.A.'s masterpiece.

At the end of 2007, Kala was named one of the year's best albums in critics' lists, including rankings at number eight (The Wire and Stylus Magazine), number seven (NME), number six (Paste, The A.V. Club and Entertainment Weekly), number four (The Guardian and Drowned in Sound), and number three (Pitchfork). The album was also listed at number three on The Village Voice's 35th annual Pazz & Jop poll. Blender and Rolling Stone both named Kala as their number one album of 2007. "Boyz" was number nine and "Shells" number sixty-seven on the same magazine's list of the 100 Best Songs of 2007 and 2008 respectively. The album was nominated for the 2007 Shortlist Music Prize.

== Commercial performance ==
Kala debuted and peaked at number 18 on the US Billboard 200, selling 29,000 copies in its first week. It also topped the Top Electronic Albums chart, and was ranked first on the Billboard Year-End Top Electronic Albums of 2007. The album was certified gold by the Recording Industry Association of America (RIAA) on 5 March 2010, and by September 2013, it had sold 559,000 copies in the United States.

The album debuted and peaked at number 39 on the UK Albums Chart. The album was certified gold by the British Phonographic Industry (BPI) on 10 January 2025, denoting sales in excess of 100,000 copies within the United Kingdom. In Canada, Kala was certified gold by Music Canada on 27 August 2018. The album also reached the top 40 in a number of other countries, including Belgium, Finland, Ireland, Japan, Norway and Sweden.

== Legacy ==
Kala appears on professional rankings of the greatest albums. In 2009, NME placed the album at number seventy-two in its list of the 100 greatest records of the decade, and Rolling Stone ranked it as the ninth best album of the same period. Christgau named it the decade's best album in his ballot for the magazine. In 2012, Rolling Stone ranked it at number 393 in a revised edition of their Rolling Stone's 500 Greatest Albums of All Time issue. In 2013, NME ranked it number 184 in its list of the 500 Greatest Albums of All Time. In 2015, the album was ranked number 42 by Spin in its list of "The 300 Best Albums of the Past 30 Years (1985-2014)". The album was also included in the book 1001 Albums You Must Hear Before You Die. In 2019, the album was ranked 75th on The Guardian's 100 Best Albums of the 21st Century list. When asked in March 2020 whether Kala remains his favourite album of the 21st century, Christgau responded, "Yup. No contest."

Writing for Dazed Digital, Grant Rinder praised the album for transforming M.I.A. from a "cult hero" to an "international star". Rinder commented that the album was a "tremendous" step forward towards shedding light on the realities of Third World countries that the Western world may not have thoroughly understood. Reflecting on diversity and representation issues in society, as well as politics surrounding President Donald Trump, Rinder said that Kala "feels particularly ahead of its time", and concluded that "M.I.A. was truly a pioneer for a global humanitarian perspective that no artist has been able to deliver quite as well since." Frank Guan of Vulture said that M.I.A. "sounded like the future" and that "her immediate influence was remarkable", as the album "seems to herald certain trends current in contemporary hip-hop". Guan further gave appraisal to M.I.A. for being the "precursor" for "fashion-rap" acts, including Travis Scott, Lil Uzi Vert, Playboi Carti, and ASAP Rocky.

In a 2013 Rolling Stone article titled "How M.I.A. made Kala", Jody Rosen regarded the album as "a landmark, agitprop dance record that restyled hip-hop as one big international block party, mixing up beatbox riddims, playground rhymes, left-field samples and gunshots. It was also, against all odds, a hit, which spawned a huge single and transformed M.I.A. from a cult heroine to an A-lister." In 2017, following the 10th anniversary of its release, Spencer Kornhaber of The Atlantic also felt that Kala "feels newly relevant amid global political currents trending toward isolationism" Reflecting on the lack of mainstream music tackling global issues, Simran Hans of Noisey wrote that Kala "felt, and still feels, like both a party, and a fight" and that it's "hard to imagine a dance record as combative being released now". Gabriela Tully Claymore of Stereogum wrote that the album "promotes a global conscience not easily heard in a lot of popular music at the time [and] it was a dance album that confronted the hegemony of a market largely dominated by quote-unquote Western forms ... M.I.A. had her finger on a pulse that spanned nations, and she figured out a way to harness disparate influences into a singular style that could thrive in various markets."

== Track listing ==
No.	Title	Writer(s)	Producer(s)	Length
1.	"Bamboo Banga"	M.I.A.; Switch; Jonathan Richman; Ilaiyaraaja	M.I.A.; Switch	4:58
2.	"Bird Flu"	M.I.A.; Switch; R. P. Patnaik	M.I.A.; Switch^{[a]}	3:24
3.	"Boyz"	M.I.A.; Switch	M.I.A.; Switch	3:27
4.	"Jimmy"	M.I.A.; Switch; Bappi Lahiri	M.I.A.; Switch	3:29
5.	"Hussel" (featuring Afrikan Boy)	M.I.A.; Switch; Diplo	M.I.A.; Switch; Diplo	4:25
6.	"Mango Pickle Down River" (with The Wilcannia Mob)	M.I.A.; Keith Dutton; Lendal King; Colin Roy Johnson; Walter Ebsworth; Buddy Blair; Morgan Lewis; Brendan Adams; Daniel Wright; Will Jarrett	M.I.A.; Morganics	3:53
7.	"20 Dollar"	M.I.A.; Switch; Charles Thompson	M.I.A.; Switch	4:34
8.	"World Town"	M.I.A.; Switch; Blaqstarr	M.I.A.; Switch	3:52
9.	"The Turn"	M.I.A.; Blaqstarr	M.I.A.; Blaqstarr	3:52
10.	"XR2"	M.I.A.; Diplo; Switch	M.I.A.; Diplo; Switch^{[a]}	4:20
11.	"Paper Planes"	M.I.A.; Diplo; Joe Strummer; Mick Jones; Paul Simonon; Topper Headon	M.I.A.; Diplo; Switch^{[a]}	3:24
12.	"Come Around" (featuring Timbaland)	Timothy Mosley; Timothy Clayton; M.I.A.	M.I.A.; Timbaland	3:53

Japanese edition bonus tracks
No.	Title	Writer(s)	Producer(s)	Length
13.	"Far Far"	M.I.A.; Switch	M.I.A.; Switch	3:24
14.	"Big Branch"	M.I.A.; Diplo; Switch		2:44
15.	"What I Got"	Arulpragasam; Charles Smith; Anthony Kiedis; Flea; John Frusciante; Chad Smith		3:15

iTunes Store US bonus track
No.	Title	Writer(s)	Producer(s)	Length
13.	"Big Branch"	M.I.A.; Diplo; Switch	Diplo; Switch^{[a]}	2:44

Best Buy edition bonus track
No.	Title	Writer(s)	Producer(s)	Length
13.	"Bird Flu" (Cavemen Remix)	M.I.A.; Switch; Patnaik	M.I.A.; Switch^{[a]}	3:18

Expanded edition bonus disc
No.	Title	Writer(s)	Producer(s)	Length
1.	"Paper Planes" (Afrikan Boy and Rye Rye Remix)	M.I.A.; Diplo; Strummer; Jones; Simonon; Headon	Diplo; Switch^{[a]}	4:01
2.	"Shells"	M.I.A.	M.I.A.; Diplo	2:36
3.	"Far Far"	M.I.A.; Switch	M.I.A.; Switch	3:24
4.	"Big Branch"	M.I.A.; Diplo; Switch	Diplo; Switch^{[a]}	2:44
5.	"What I Got"	M.I.A.; Blaqstarr	Blaqstarr	3:15
6.	"Sound of Kuduro" (Buraka Som Sistema featuring DJ Znobia, M.I.A., Saborosa, and Puto Prata)	M.I.A.; Buraka Som Sistema	Conductor; Riot; Lil' John	3:19

=== Notes ===
- ^{^[a]} signifies an additional producer

=== Sample credits ===
- "Bamboo Banga" incorporates elements of "Roadrunner" written by Jonathan Richman and "Kaattukkuyilu", written and performed by Ilaiyaraaja from the film Thalapathi.
- "Bird Flu" incorporates elements of "Thirvizha Na Vantha" written and performed by R. P. Patnaik from the film Jayam.
- "Jimmy" incorporates elements of "Jimmy Jimmy Jimmy Aaja" written by Bappi Lahiri from the film Disco Dancer.
- "Mango Pickle Down River" is remixed from the original recording "Down River" by the Wilcannia Mob.
- "20 Dollar" incorporates elements of "Where Is My Mind?" by the Pixies.
- "World Town" incorporates elements of "Hands Up, Thumbs Down" written by Blaqstarr.
- "Paper Planes" incorporates elements of "Straight to Hell" by the Clash.

== Personnel ==
Credits adapted from the liner notes of the expanded edition of Kala.

- M.I.A. – vocals (all tracks), production (tracks 1–6, 8, 9, bonus disc tracks 2, 3), additional vocal production (track 6), artwork, photography
- Afrikan Boy – vocals (track 5, bonus disc track 1)
- Jim Beanz – vocal production (track 12)
- Janette Beckman – photography
- Blaqstarr – production (track 9, bonus disc track 5), vocal production (bonus disc track 1)
- Demacio "Demo" Castellon – engineering, mixing, programming (track 12)
- Conductor – production (bonus disc track 6)
- Diplo – production (tracks 5, 10, 11, bonus disc tracks 1, 2, 4), additional vocal production (track 6)
- DJ Ability – cuts (track 6)
- Marty Green – assistant engineering (track 12)
- Liz Johnson-Artur – photography
- Michael Kamber – photography
- Lil' John – production (bonus disc track 6)
- Steve Loveridge – additional graphics
- Larry "Live" Lyons – assistant engineering (track 12)
- Morganics – production (track 6)
- Carri Mundane – additional graphics
- Riot – production (bonus disc track 6)
- Rye Rye – vocals (bonus disc track 1)
- Spike Stent – mixing (tracks 3, 4)
- Switch – production (tracks 1, 3–5, 7, 8, bonus disc track 3), additional production (tracks 2, 10, 11, bonus disc tracks 1, 4), mixing (track 11)
- Ron Taylor – vocal Pro Tools editing (track 12)
- Timbaland – all instruments, production, vocals (track 12)
- The Wilcannia Mob – vocals (track 6)

== Charts ==
=== Weekly charts ===
Chart (2007)	Peak position
Australian Albums (ARIA)	46
Australian Urban Albums (ARIA)	6
Austrian Albums (Ö3 Austria)	74
Belgian Albums (Ultratop Flanders)	22
Canadian Albums (Billboard)	16
Dutch Albums (Album Top 100)	44
European Albums (Billboard)	74
Finnish Albums (Suomen virallinen lista)	38
French Albums (SNEP)	117
German Albums (Offizielle Top 100)	93
Irish Albums (IRMA)	22
Japanese Albums (Oricon)	23
Norwegian Albums (VG-lista)	22
Scottish Albums (Official Charts)	67
Swedish Albums (Sverigetopplistan)	18
Swiss Albums (Schweizer Hitparade)	74
UK Albums (Official Charts)	39
UK R&B Albums (Official Charts)	3
US Billboard 200	18
US Top Dance Albums (Billboard)	1
US Top Rap Albums (Billboard)	8

=== Year-end charts ===
Chart (2007)	Position
Australian Urban Albums (ARIA)	30
US Top Dance/Electronic Albums (Billboard)	5

Chart (2008)	Position
Australian Urban Albums (ARIA)	41
US Top Dance/Electronic Albums (Billboard)	1

Chart (2009)	Position
US Top Dance/Electronic Albums (Billboard)	14

== Certifications ==
Region	Certification	Certified units/sales
Canada (Music Canada)	Platinum	100,000^{‡}
New Zealand (RMNZ)	Platinum	15,000^{‡}
United Kingdom (BPI)	Gold	100,000^{‡}
United States (RIAA)	Gold	559,000
^{‡} Sales+streaming figures based on certification alone.

== Release history ==
Region	Date	Edition	Label	Ref.
Japan	8 August 2007	Limited	Beggars Japan	
Australia	20 August 2007	Standard	XL	
Sweden	20 August 2007	Standard	XL	
United Kingdom	20 August 2007	Standard	XL	
Canada	21 August 2007	Standard	XL	
France	21 August 2007	Standard	XL	
United States	21 August 2007	Standard	XL; Interscope	
Germany	24 August 2007	Standard	XL	
United Kingdom	13 October 2008	Expanded	XL	
France	14 October 2008	Expanded	XL	
Australia	25 October 2008	Expanded	XL	
