= Boyz (M.I.A. song) =

Single by M.I.A.

from the album Kala
- Released: 11 June 2007
- Recorded: c. 2006
- Genre: Dance; worldbeat; soca; tribal house; dancehall
- Length: 3:26
- Label: XL Recordings; Interscope
- Songwriters: Maya Arulpragasam; Dave Taylor
- Producers: M.I.A.; Switch

M.I.A. singles chronology
"Bucky Done Gun" (2005)	"Boyz" (2007)	"Jimmy" (2007)

Music video
- "Boyz" on YouTube

"Boyz" is a song recorded by artist M.I.A. for her second album Kala (2007). The song was written and produced by Maya "M.I.A." Arulpragasam and Dave "Switch" Taylor and composed in recording sessions held in several countries. A combination of the native styles and influences of these regions and her traditional and electronic musical roots, the song sees M.I.A. mock and simultaneously praise men for various character traits. "Boyz" was one of the first songs that the artist composed for the album and was released as the album's lead single through XL Recordings and Interscope Records on 11 June 2007, in 12-inch single, CD single, digital download and USB flash drive formats. It additionally appeared in an enhanced EP format for its CD single release, and appeared on the How Many Votes Fix Mix EP edition. On 24 April 2007, "Boyz" received its world premiere on the BBC Radio 1 radio station in London.

An uptempo dance song, "Boyz" draws from West Indian soca and Tamil gaana influences, incorporating electronica and club music influences to a 4/4 beat bassline. Displaying elements of worldbeat, its instrumentation consists of urumee drum percussion, trumpets, tambourines, electronic scratches and synths. Its lyrics make reference to male bravado, warlords, motorcycle and dirty track riding and dance moves originating from Jamaica, a country that inspired the song's composition. "Boyz" placed at number nine on the Rolling Stone "100 Best Songs of 2007" list and ranked one of the best songs of the year and the decade by Blender Magazine, NME, Eye Weekly and PopMatters.

The single's accompanying music video was directed by Jay Will Williams and M.I.A., presenting the singer-rapper dancing with several male dancers from Jamaican dance crews surrounded by colourful lo-fi computer-animated graphics, garnering critical acclaim for its subversive nature and triggering a new dance and graphic design revolution in music and videos.

"Boyz" was nominated for the "Viral Woodie" at the 2007 mtvU Woodie Awards. The song made appearances in many television shows and video games since its release, and featured in the film Eat Pray Love. "Boyz" reached number seven on the Canadian Singles Chart and the US Billboard Hot Singles Sales chart and number ninety-nine on the Billboard Pop 100. Peaking at number three on the Billboard Hot Dance Singles Sales, eight places higher than "Galang", "Boyz" gave M.I.A. her first top ten charting single and the record for the first artist of Sri Lankan and Tamil descent to have a top ten charting single in Billboard history and the first to chart on the Billboard Pop 100. "Boyz" was also part of her set list on the Kala Tour (2007) and People vs. Money Tour (2008).

== Background ==
"So when I started this album, I really thought, "I don't know why I'm doing this, I don't know who I'm doing it for. I don't know anything. I'm out of this relationship, Timbaland, that dream and hope, is not gonna happen, and I probably don't even wanna make music." I was exhausted, and then this album just came out from that weird place. I just didn't care what anyone was going to think. And it just ended up being what it is because it came out from a time of just trying to survive, in music, as a woman"

– M.I.A. talking to the magazine The List about the background to the recording of her second album Kala.

Written and produced by Maya "M.I.A." Arulpragasam and Dave "Switch" Taylor, "Boyz" was the first official single to be released from M.I.A.'s second studio album Kala and one of the first songs composed for the album. During an interview with The Big Issue following the release of debut album Arular, M.I.A. stated that she was looking forward to writing her second album the next year, spending six months in Jamaica and collaborating with high-profile American producers.

The songwriter was unable to gain a long-term work visa to enter the US in 2006 and access the demos she had composed and stored at her New York flat. With the visa denial, she ended up couch-surfing, sleeping at other people's houses in London, as her constant touring on dates in Canada, Argentina and Brazil meant that she no longer had a home in England. She said in an interview "I had to start from scratch with what was around me. The thing is, I get bored easily, and I don't see the point of doing something twice. I made Arular in London; I'd already made a real London album. I just thought, fuck it. If I'm gonna couch-surf in London, I might as well go and couch surf in India or Liberia." M.I.A. opted to record the album at a variety of locations around the world, beginning by travelling to India following the release of "Bucky Done Gun" and the last date of her Arular Tour in Japan in February 2006. She said of her decision "I wanted to get out of people's view: to go and spend time learning about myself and trying to be better. Not really technically better, but I just wanted to be better as a human being. And it's really hard to do that when you make club music."

M.I.A. initially travelled to Chennai, India to meet A. R. Rahman, but found it hard to communicate her ideas to him and the planned musical collaboration did not take place. Rahman did, however, provide M.I.A. with a number of instrumentalist contacts and allow her to use his studio AM Studios to record songs for Kala. The singer was amused during recording the song in India that she needed her brother Sugu to repeat some of her instructions to the instrumentalists for them to play, saying "you have to have somebody who's male, who looks like you, standing next to you like a Siamese twin that's attached at the hip, and they have to be your mouth." Producer Switch, who met the songwriter in Trinidad had later travelled to India purely to engineer more planned sessions, but ultimately became involved in the composition of "Boyz" and other Kala tracks. On this second trip to India, M.I.A. recorded in Kovalam, Tamil Nadu, during which the pair recorded the song and others in a cupboard with a broken monitor due to lack of recording space in the music studio. The singer was able to record the song further in Trinidad again, in Jamaica and later America. She described Trinidad, where she also recorded songs such as "Big Branch" and World Town" for the album, as where the inspiration to put the "meat" of all the songs of Kala together came from, saying "Trinidad is halfway between Jamaica and India. It was nice to see a new Indian approach to life—like Indian people going Jamaican, and the music that comes out is something totally different and weird. There's something that's so approachable about Trinidad and then something that's so dark—people don't really know that. When I was there, it was 50–50, all the time." The song, which epitomises "a world-weary sarcasm that pervades" much of the lyrical content of Kala, began from M.I.A.'s frustration and exhaustion following touring for Arular and her experiences as a woman recording her album.

== Composition ==
"Boyz" is an uptempo dance song, incorporating elements of worldbeat, electronica and dancehall music. "Boyz" follows the "nu world" music style that M.I.A. categorises Kala as presenting. M.I.A. has openly discussed her motivations for the song, saying in an interview that "Boyz" was recorded like all of her music, "like a collage" so as not to "fill the same formula" of composition technique amongst her peers, continuing "I don't really do it in a classic sense, like these are the five pieces of happiness dispersed through three and half minutes." Like fellow Kala track "Bird Flu", the song uses urumee drums, a signature instrument of gaana, a folk Tamil genre of music which M.I.A. was familiar with from her time spent living in Sri Lanka and India. Incorporating this style with 22 members of the drumming group The Tapes from Chennai, the songwriter took her material to Trinidad where vocals were recorded and she absorbed influences from the country's love of soca music, a West Indian genre. The song was then worked on further in Brooklyn. The rapper wanted to "create a new way to feel music" with the song by including "ups and downs: the basic chorus, soca for the tempo, and you just fuck around with that."

Tom Breihan of the Village Voice noted that the drums on Kala were "crazy disorienting", departing heavily from those on predecessor Arular. M.I.A highlighted that drums were recorded to introduce a more organic sound to electronic music while remaining digital and futuristic in the song's style, as she felt that the "world was going kind of disco/electro Justicey kind of beat [...] the kind of dance-music revival of the 90s". As with the rest of Kala, M.I.A. and co-composer Switch relied heavily on Logic Pro, a digital audio workstation produced by Apple, and were able to capture vocals and background sounds outside the traditional studio environment, using a microphone and a MacBook Pro. Consisting of urumee drum percussion, trumpets, tambourines, electronic scratches and synths, the song's instrumentation also consists of repetitive pumped-up synthesizers and 4/4 beats. Sukant Chandan writing in the Green Left Weekly noted the percussion on "Boyz" contributed to the "cohesion and continuity throughout" Kala. M.I.A. likened the process of recording the album to "making a big old marble cake with lots of different countries and influences. Then you slice it up and call each slice a song", revealing how she set about achieving some continuum across the album with each song. M.I.A. has noted the resulting "very outdoors" sound as what she aimed for with the composition, despite the drum orchestra being recorded indoors at the Panchathan Record Inn and AM Studios.

The lyrics of "Boyz" display M.I.A.'s response to men following issues being a female in the music industry she faces and expectations in her personal life from her then boyfriend to give up making music and start a family. "Boyz" acknowledges the artist's time in Jamaica, and the singer has described the song as partly a tribute to the country. The song references Jamaican dance moves. As Michael Hubbard of MusicOMH notes, "Boyz" is ostensibly a ditty by a woman about the opposite sex, where the lyrics ask "how many boys are crazy and how many start a war" while Ann Powers of the Los Angeles Times said that the punch line of this "call-out to "no money boys" is that they go from being "crazy" and "raw" to starting a war," concluding that "Macho posturing plus poverty equals violence: There's a Third World reality that M.I.A.'s song renders anything but abstract."

== Release and live performances ==
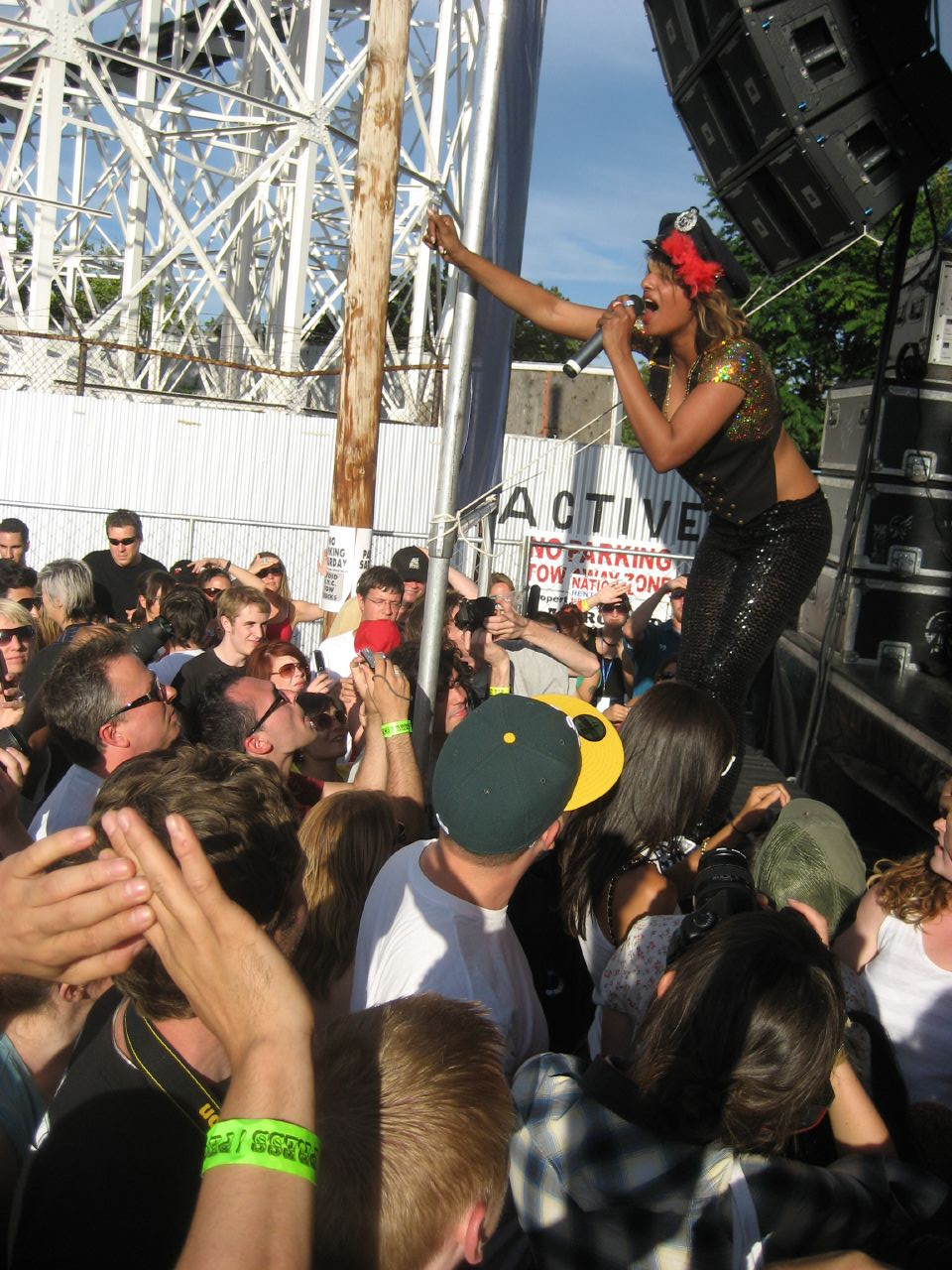
M.I.A. performing "Boyz" at the Siren Music Festival during her Kala Tour in support of the album

The song was premiered on Zane Lowe's BBC Radio 1 show as the "Hottest Record in the World" on 24 April 2007. On 3 June 2007, the high quality radio edit of "Boyz" was leaked to the internet. On 10 June 2007, details of the release were published on M.I.A.'s official website. The track was released on 11 June 2007 by XL Recordings as a limited edition 12-inch maxi single and in USB key format, and as a 12-inch vinyl and enhanced EP CD single (Boyz EP) in the US via Interscope Records on 17 July 2007. The Boyz EP release includes a cappella and instrumental versions of the single, photos, remix parts, the video, and a making of the video part 1 feature. An Akon remix of "Boyz" was leaked at the time of the EP's release. The single was listed for purchase on M.I.A.'s official website music store on 10 August 2007 in physical CD-single, 12" vinyl and also limited edition 512MB USB stick/wristband (released in five different colours) format. The song was released on 18 June 2007 on iTunes and peaked at number nineteen on the UK iTunes Dance Most Downloaded Songs.

During the performance of "Boyz" during the Kala Tour and the /\/\ /\ Y /\ Tour, the songwriter brought male concertgoers onstage to dance with her.

== Critical reception ==
The song has received acclaim from a wide variety of publications, and has been viewed as a highlight of Kala. Isaac McCalla of About.com praised the energy of the track as "bound to set feet on fire", noting how the live instrumentation of world beats, chanting and crowd noise on the song gave the recording an authentic feel, and allowed listeners to "nearly see dust kicking into the air at a tribal ceremony as the disc spins." In another 4 star review, Fraser McAlpine, writing for BBC Radio 1, highlighted the song as an ode to men, saying that the singer "likes the boys who fall over when they dance, she likes the ones who act a bit mad cos they're over-compensating for not having any cash, she likes the ones who drive motorbikes and she likes the ones who can cook chicken on a wall." Describing the song as "morse discourse" due to its lyrical ambiguity, and stating that he had little idea of what message the singer wished to give with her "Nananaananaananaa" lyric, McAlpine concluded that M.I.A. still "seems very keen that we should all hear what she's saying, cos that rhythm is hammered across everything, from the battered brass and pixie yells to the drunk samba drums." Rosie Swash of The Guardian commented in a positive review that "Boyz" was "missing no action" and that the song "stutters into life with an inane cry of "na na na na na na!" " before continuing into a "catchy character assassination of Boyz who are raw and crazy and start wars." Swash felt that "if anyone can get away with this kind of superficial analysis of the male of species, then it's riddim rider MIA." Jesal 'Jay Soul' Padania of RapReviews described the song as an "undeniable rump-shaker". Ann Powers of the Los Angeles Times described the song as starting with "a taunt with a hyperactive" drumroll, with the singer "sounding like The Muppets singing the Menomena song."

Robert Christgau, writing in Rolling Stone in a highly favourable track by track review of Kala commented on the video's use of "synchronized Kingston rudies shaking their money makers for the Interscope dollar", while comparing the acute "high kiddie/girlie interjections[...] that's sustained pitchwise" on the song to the vocals on "Bird Flu". He felt that only with the fourth track on the album did a conventional song surface, but that this compositional stye employed earlier contributed well to the "heavier, noiser, more jagged" whole of Kala. Conversely, Jonathan Keefe writing in Slant Magazine felt that this was a flaw with "Boyz", stating that unlike the minimalism of "Galang," it "barely qualifies as a song and is undone as a potential club-banger by playing too loose with its rhythmic shifts." Dan Weiss of LAS Magazine noted that the "few booming calls" on "Boyz" sounded more like "triumphant hoedowns at a summer camp than fierce indictments of foreign policy", contributing to a more calmer and scattered feel to Kala than predecessor Arular. Weiss noted that the cover artwork for the single matched the music video and that the song could be a "boy crazy tune" or a demand for a boy that will "start a war," before saying "given her mixed messages, maybe Arulpragasam is just mocking the ones that do start wars with a faux-fistpumper. Her tone, droll as ever, tends to make it hard to tell." Dan Raper of PopMatters said that "Boyz" is "the hugest-sounding song on the album—it has layers beneath layers, and sounds nothing like its soca roots."

=== Accolades ===
The Guardian Guide named "Boyz" their Single of the Week, calling it "a riotous blitz of jerky military riddims." The song ranked on several publications end of year lists for the best song of 2007. "Boyz" placed at number 9 on the Rolling Stone "100 Best Songs of 2007" list. NME ranked the song number 41 on its list of the top songs of 2007, while Pitchforkmedia positioned the song at number 21 on its year-end list. "Boyz" placed number 18 on the Village Voice's Pazz & Jop poll of the top 40 singles of 2007, and PopMatters ranked the song 17 on their list of the top singles of the year. GQ Magazine (Spain) included "Boyz" at number 16 on its list of the Top Foreign Songs of 2007, while Porcys deemed "Boyz" to be the 15th best track released in 2007. Similarly, Blender Magazine and Eye Weekly ranked "Boyz" as being one of the best songs released of 2007 on their respective lists.

== Song use in media and influence ==
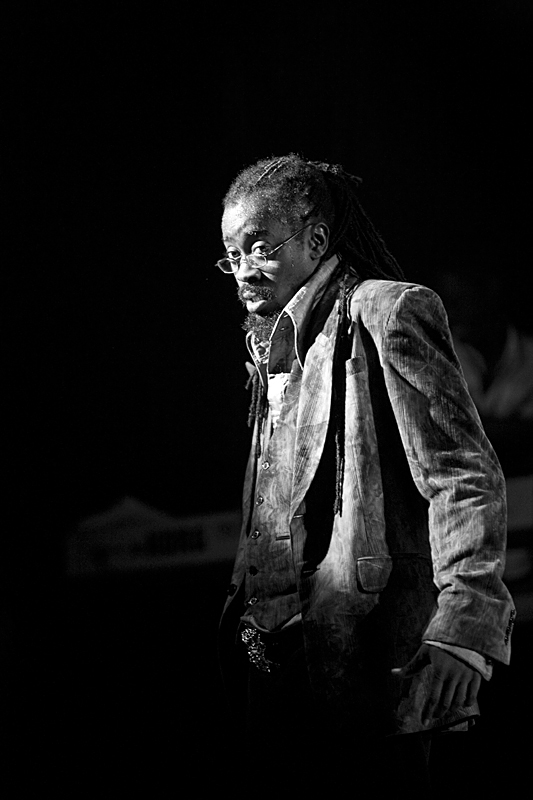
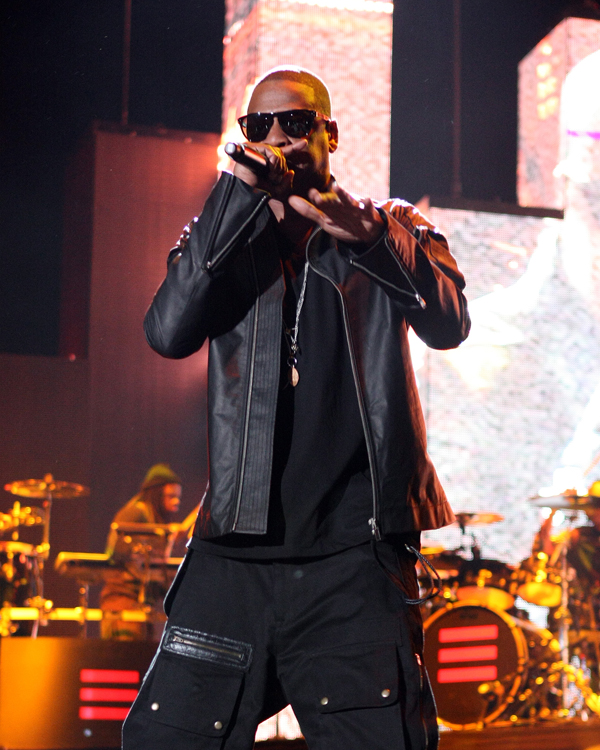
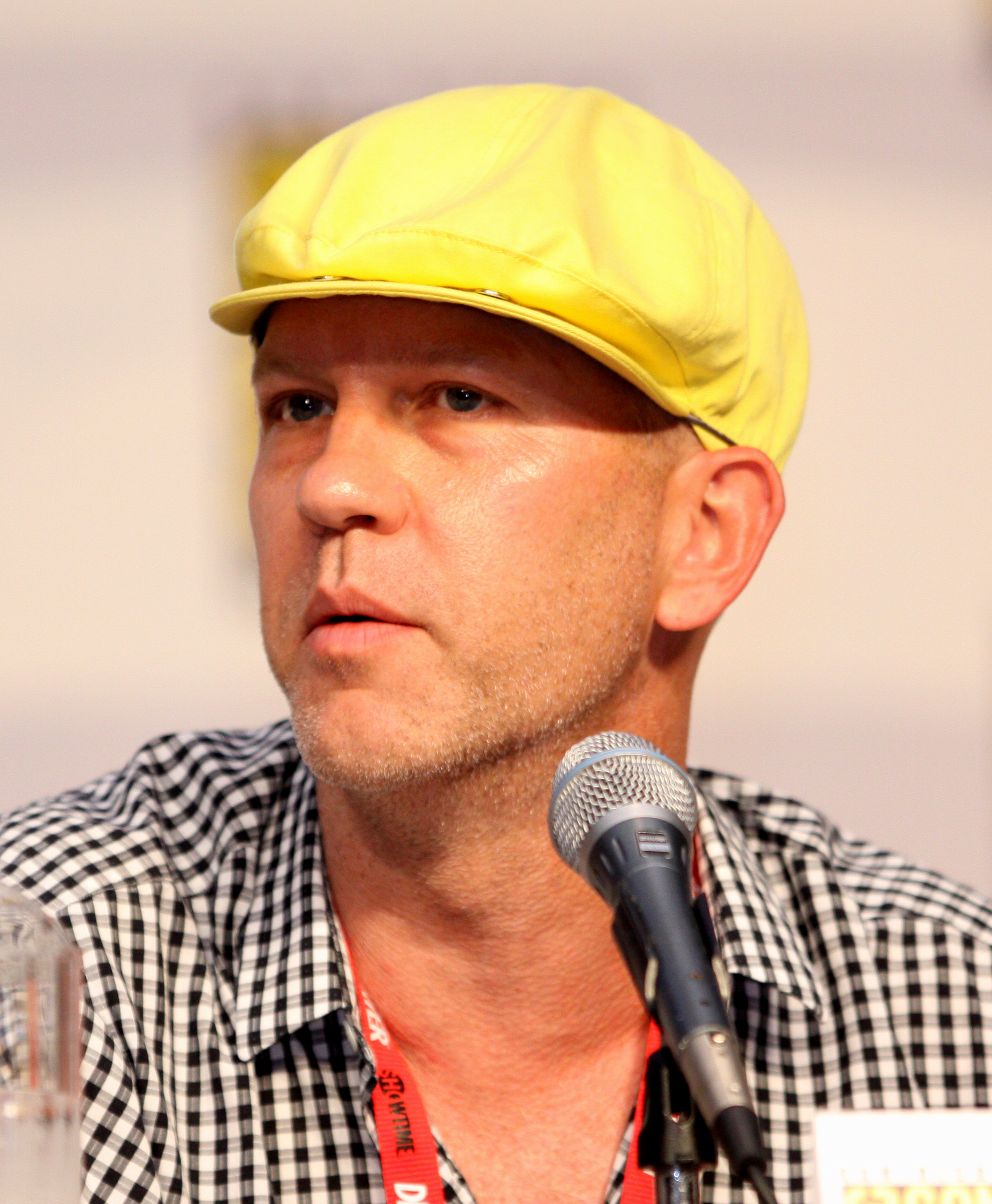
The song has seen multiple media appearances, including Jamaican club rotations by DJ Beenie Man (left), an official remix featuring entrepreneur Jay-Z (centre) and in the film Eat, Pray, Love directed by Ryan Murphy (right).

The song has been covered, sampled and remixed by various artists as well as being used by a range of media. "Boyz" was featured in the episode "Fight or Flight" from season 2 of the TV show Heroes. It appeared in a sixth-season episode of the TV show CSI: Miami and the episode "Back to New York" from the fourth season of the MTV show The Hills. "Boyz" appears in the football video game FIFA Street 3 along with other Kala track "Bird Flu" and in the basketball video game NBA 08.

On 9 October 2008, two remixes of "Boyz" were leaked onto the internet with one featuring rapper Wale and the other, Jay-Z. The remix featuring Jay-Z appears on the How Many Votes Fix Mix EP. The song is sampled by Swizz Beatz in the song "I'm Supposed to Ball" and by the Very Best in a cover version on the mixtape Esau Mwamwaya and Radioclit are the Very Best.

Wale would go on to record and release the song "Chillin" featuring Lady Gaga in 2009, in which M.I.A. and her song lyrics are referenced, and Gaga emulates the artist by employing a similar vocal style. The song received a mixed response. The video for Rihanna's 2010 hit "Rude Boy" was heavily influenced by the video for "Boyz". The singer Nicole Scherzinger has cited the song as a further draw for her towards M.I.A.'s innovative guerilla style of music.

"Boyz" was featured in the Ryan Murphy-directed film Eat Pray Love and in a trailer for Dumb and Dumber To. The song sound-tracked the "Best Movie" category at the 2008 MTV Movie Awards. The song was additionally featured at the beginning of the season 2 premiere of The Mindy Project.

== Music video ==
The music video for the single was directed by Jason "Jay Will" Williams and M.I.A., and shot in Jamaica towards the end of April 2007. On the day of her arrival, Williams took M.I.A. to Dutty Fridays, a well known club in the country, where she met some dancers. The musician Beenie Man had the song played by the DJ in the club continuously for 45 minutes that night. It eventually created a dance revolution in the country, attracting so much attention that the island's dance crews arrived en masse for the video shoot. Photographs from the set of the video appeared on the internet in early May, prompting speculation about her outfits and hair in the video. The video features M.I.A. singing and dancing in serene surroundings with vibrant, neon colours and animation graphics, accompanied by several male dancers of the different dance crews in Jamaica. One scene sees M.I.A. dancing around a defunct car. The video premiered on M.I.A.'s official website and MySpace page on 10 June 2007. In the "Making of 'Boyz' video" feature, Arulpragasam stated she "wanted the frame to end up looking just like ripped-off flyer posters." She took the video to England, before completing graphics for it in New York.

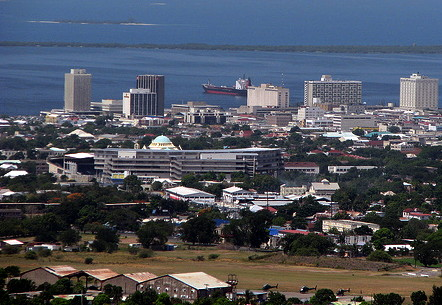
The video was filmed in Kingston, Jamaica, imaged above

Talking about the making of the video in Jamaica, which she described as the high point during the making of her album, she said "I had so much cooperation and dedication from the dancers. As soon as I played it one time and they totally got it. Nobody questioned nothing. Nobody cares, you know? It was just like, "Has it got a good beat? Does it make me wanna dance? That's enough for us.". She continued "I hoped the Jamaicans would get it. They meant so much to me at the time I was writing ["Boyz"]. I went there to shoot the video, and they loved it! When I took it back there and played it to those people and showed them, 'This is what I wrote when I thought about you,' they got it. And that makes me feel like I don't really care what happens with this album, and I don't care if Interscope loves or hates me." The subversive nature of the video has also been noted by M.I.A., who aimed to be the only female in the video, with 100 male dancers singing the lyrics to the song in the video, to "treat men the way they treat us". Given issues of homophobia in the country, M.I.A. explained "It's interesting that they are dancing and singing along to "How many, how many boys there?" and singing about boys. So... You know what I mean? So we were kind of subverting things and making them say something or accept something that they wouldn't otherwise. So I felt like I'd achieved something with that. They don't know that. [Laughs.] If you print it, they're gonna find out!" [Laughs.] They'll be like "whaaaaaat???" But I think that was kind of funny... I was telling my friend, "No one else could get 100 Jamaican boys to be dancing and saying 'How many boys there?' you know?" They just wouldn't do that. So, yeah... I've done it!"

A writer in The Fader called the video "totally insane" and that viewers "have dance moves for the next 8,000 years." Sam Lewis of Drowned in Sound called the video "ludicrously colourful", comparing it favourably to the cover artwork of Kala. It was named Spinner Magazine's Video of the Day on 19 June 2007, with the return of M.I.A.'s vintage dance moves named the highlight of the video.

== Track listings and formats ==
Promo CD

1. "Boyz" – 3:28
2. "Boyz" [a cappella] – 3:00
3. "Boyz" [instrumental] – 3:29

12" vinyl

1. "Boyz" [album version] – 3:28

US CD single (Enhanced EP)/USB wristband

1. "Boyz" – 3:28
2. "Boyz" [a cappella] – 3:00
3. "Boyz" [instrumental] – 3:29
4. Photos
5. Remixes
6. Video
7. Making of the Video Part 1

== Credits and personnel ==
- Maya "M.I.A" Arulpragasam – songwriting, producer, artwork
- Dave "Switch" Taylor – songwriting, producer
- Mark "Spike" Stent – mixing

Credits adapted from album liner notes:

== Charts ==
=== Weekly charts ===
Chart (2007)	Peak
US Billboard Hot Singles Sales	7
US Billboard Hot R&B/Hip-Hop Singles Sales	13
US Billboard Hot Dance Singles Sales	3

Chart (2008)	Peak
US Billboard Pop 100	99
