= Kunangudi Masthan Sahib =

Tamil Qadriyya Sufi

Kunangudi Masthan Sahib (1792–1838) was a Tamil Qadiriyya Sufi poet and composer. His songs remain popular today, especially in the Gaana music of Chennai.

== Early life ==
Masthan Sahib was Born at Kunangudi near Thondi in Ramanathapuram district, he was named Sultan Abdul Kadir Sahib at birth his parents Nainar Mohamed Sahib and Fathima bivi were Wealthy Rowther parents but the son chose to give it all up, seeking the supreme truth. He became a Sufi, taking to the Qadariya order. His love for God he expressed in the form of songs. To him, God was the beloved and in some of the songs, in keeping with the Sufi tradition. Eventually he gave up a worldly life and became an ascetic and mystic, wandering from place to place, living in forests, and eventually settling in Chennai.

== Family background ==
He was the grandson of the Tamil poet Minna Noor-ud-din, who sang 'பொன்னரிய மாலை' (Ponnariya Malai). Minna Noor-ud-din's father was Peer Rowther, and his grandfather was Meeran Kani Annaviyar (Meeran Kani Rowther), who sang 'அரக்கான் மாலைச் சுருக்கம்' (Arakkan Maalai Surukkam). Annaviyar's father, Seiku Nainar Rowther (Kananavirayar - கனகவிராயர்), was also a Tamil poet. Mastan Sahib's family was an aristocratic poetic family.

== Life ==
At the Tirupparankunram shrine, Masthan Sahib is said to have experienced as profound mystical awakening while undergoing chilla, a forty-day period of secluded meditation. His major verse collection, the Masthan Saheb Padalgal, deals with the power of this shrine.

Masthan Sahib taught his many disciples by composing around one hundred devotional and philosophical poems, totaling some 5000 lines. Many of them were modeled on the work of kirtan composers and hymn writers like Thayumanavar. Masthan Sahib's work has been described as having "pathos and feeling" equal to Thayumanavar, but with simple and colloquial language that was sometimes crude or obscene. Masthan Sahib was also influenced by the works of Tamil siddhars (tantric adepts).

In the second half of the nineteenth century, Aiyacami Mutaliyar composed a praise-poem on Masthan Sahib entitled Kunankutiyar Patirruppattantati. Twentieth-century veena player V.S. Gomathisankara Iyer set his songs to Carnatic tunes, making them suitable for concert play. An album of his works sung by notable Gaana singer Mylai Venu, was released by India's National Folklore Support Center in 2008.

His dargah in Chennai still attracts pilgrims and visitors. It is constructed with an architectural style influenced by Hindu temples. Most notably, it has a mandapam (ceremonial hall or platform) resembling those in Tamil temples. That he fused influences from Hindu singers with Sufi Muslim asceticism and teachings suggests his religiosity was syncretic, combining many strands of Tamil spirituality. Also buried at his dargah are four of his disciples - Pulavar Nayagangal (Sheikh Abdul Qadir), Qadir Mastan Sahib, Madhar Bibi and Ibrahim Sahib.

The locals of North Chennai, where he spent his last years, referred to him as Tondiar ("someone from Thondi"). So the neighborhood of Chennai where he lived became known as Tondiarpet.
