= The Wilcannia Mob =

Australian hip-hop group (2001–2004)

- Also known as: Barkandji Boys
- Origin: Wilcannia, New South Wales, Australia
- Genre: Hip hop
- Years active: 2001–2004
- Members: Buddy Blair; Keith Dutton; Wally Ebsworth; Colin "Colroy" Johnson; Lendal King
- Website: downriver.com.au/about-down-river/

The Wilcannia Mob or Barkandji Boys were a hip-hop musical group of five Indigenous Australians from Wilcannia, New South Wales. The group formed in 2001, aged from nine to fourteen, with Buddy Blair, Keith Dutton, Wally Ebsworth, Colin "Colroy" Johnson and Lendal King. Their debut single, "Down River", was issued in 2002 and received high rotation on national youth radio, Triple J – it was listed at No. 51 on their Hottest 100 for that year. It won a Deadly award for Single Release of the Year, in 2003.

== History ==
Barkandji Boys were formed in 2001 by five Indigenous Australians from Wilcannia: Buddy Blair, Keith Dutton, Wally Ebsworth, Colin "Colroy" Johnson and Lendal King. The members were aged from nine to fourteen. They were renamed as the Wilcannia Mob after they were discovered by Sydney-based rap and hip-hop artist, Morganics, during children's musical and theatre workshops in their home town in October 2001.

They issued a single in 2002, "Down River", which won a Deadly award for Single Release of the Year in 2003. A didgeridoo, made from a gum branch by Johnson, features in the song. It was reissued on a various artists CD, All You Mob, (ABC Records) which included more of their songs and others recorded by other acts in outback communities elsewhere. The Wilcannia Mob made their live performance debut at Sydney's Homebake Festival in December 2002. "Down River" appeared at No. 51 on Triple J's Hottest 100 Countdown for 2002. King's mother, Kerry, described how "the song gives a positive image back to Wilcannia... The simple things they sing about indicate our lifestyle; how we can live in a remote area in a harmonistic way. There are not a lot of material things out there, but it's about using what's there in the river and being part of our life."

The Sri Lankan-British artist M.I.A. featured the boys singing "Down River" on the track, "Mango Pickle Down River", on her 2007 album, Kala. In July 2008 King, then 15 years old, told Peter Munro of The Sydney Morning Herald that he was the only one "still living in Wilcannia" although he "wants to move to Sydney and become a musician." Munro reported that "Dutton, his voice now deep and gravelly, works as a builder and gardener on community projects. Ebsworth studies art at Dubbo TAFE. Blair is in Adelaide dreaming of a solo music career. The diminutive Johnson is now tall and is finishing school in Bourke."
