= Isaivani =

Indian gaana singer (c. 1993-)

Isaivani இசைவாணி
- Born: 16 April 1996 (age 30); Madras (now Chennai), Tamil Nadu, India
- Genres: Gaana
- Occupation: Singer

Isaivani (Tamil: இசைவாணி; born 16 April 1996) is a gaana singer who performs with The Casteless Collective based in Chennai, the capital of Tamil Nadu, India.

In 2020 she was recognised for her achievements with one of the BBC 100 Women Awards.

== Biography ==
Isaivani was born on 16 April 1996 to Selvi and D. Sivakumar, a couple from the Royapuram locality of Chennai. Her father, a self-taught keyboardist, encouraged her musical ability and singing from a young age, encouraging Selvi to sing to Isaivani and her brother while they were in the womb. Her performance career began at the age of six, alongside her father and by 2018 she had performed approximately 10,000 shows with him. She began sing Tamil film songs and to cover gaana songs as a teenager because audiences responded well to them. In 2017, gaana musician Sabesh Solomon contacted her and encouraged her to audition for a new band that was being formed by Tenma - this band became The Casteless Collective.

By joining the band, Isaivani became one of the first professional female gaana singers in the world. In addition she is a woman from a low caste, succeeding in a male, high-caste dominated genre of music, despite initial opposition from people who felt that gaana should be preserved as male-only artform. The music she sings with The Casteless Collective is political: in 2018 they released 'Beef Song' in protest at the lynching of dalit people; in 2019 they released 'I’m Sorry Ayyappa' about the Sabarimala temple controversy. Her presence on stage has led to other women coming forward as gaana performers.

In 2020, Isaivani was recognised for her contributions to gaana music with a BBC 100 Women Award. She participated in Tamil Bigg Boss Season 5.

== Television ==
Year	Show	Role	Channel	Notes
2018	Singing Stars	Contestant	Colors Tamil	Finalist
2020	Tamilargale Tamilargale	Guest	Kalaignar TV	
2021	Vanakam Tamizha	Guest	Sun TV	
2021	Tamizha Tamizha	Herself	Zee Tamil	Episode; 112
2021-2022	Bigg Boss Tamil Season 5	Contestant	Vijay TV	Evicted Day 49
2022	Bigg Boss Tamil Season 5 Kondattam	Guest	Vijay TV	
2022	BB Jodigal (season 2)	Contestant	Vijay TV	Evicted Top 7

== Tamil album songs ==
Year	album	Song	Music director	Notes
2024	Jamaya Kamaya	"Jamaya Kamaya"	Bennet Christopher	Album for Giant Music India
