= Shirō Asano (politician) =

Japanese politician (born 1948)

- 浅野 史郎

Governor of Miyagi Prefecture
- In office 21 November 1993 – 20 November 2005
- Monarch: Akihito
- Preceded by: Shuntarō Honma
- Succeeded by: Yoshihiro Murai

Personal details
- Born: 8 February 1948 (age 78) Ōfunato, Iwate, Japan
- Party: Independent
- Education: University of Tokyo

Shiro Asano (浅野 史郎, Asano Shirō; born 8 February 1948) is the former governor of Miyagi, Japan, and currently university professor & political commentator.

== Background ==
=== Early life and administrative career ===
Asano was born in the northern port town of Ōfunato, Iwate, where his father was a town doctor. His father moved to nearby Tome, Miyagi and at age 4 to Sendai, the prefectural capital of Miyagi. He grew up there until finishing high school.

Asano graduated from the faculty of law of University of Tokyo in 1970 and joined the Ministry of Health and Welfare. From 1972 to 1974 he was an exchange student at the University of Illinois, Graduate School of Political Science. He returned to Japan until 1978, when he was stationed at the Japanese embassy in Washington D.C. as second and first secretary. The position in Washington lasted until 1980. Back in Japan he worked a number of posts in the Ministry of Health and Welfare and in 1993 he was posted to Miyagi Prefecture.

=== Political career ===
A few months after Asano arrived in Miyagi, the prefectural governor and the mayor of the city of Sendai were indicted in bribery charges that shocked the population. With little time to prepare he decided to run for the prefecture where he had grown up. He won, and his grass-roots approach to campaigning would carry him two more terms to the position of governor.

In 2005 he stepped aside and started a new career as an academic (now professor at Keio University and Tohoku University) and political TV commentator. Charismatic and good speaker he was encouraged to run for Tokyo governor in the 2007 Tokyo gubernatorial election. He faced Shintaro Ishihara, who run for his third four-year term, and several minor candidates. With barely a couple of months to prepare Asano ended up second on that election.
