= 2007 Tokyo gubernatorial election =

Gubernatorial election in Tokyo, Japan

- April 8, 2007
- Turnout: 54.35%
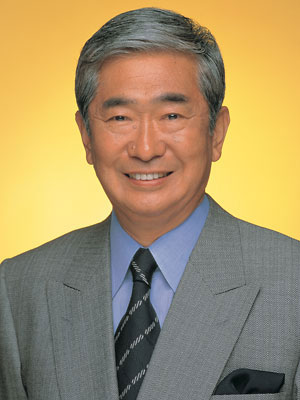

Candidate	Shintarō Ishihara	Shirō Asano
Party	Independent	Independent
Popular vote	2,811,486	1,693,323
Percentage	50.52%	30.43%
Governor before election
Shintarō Ishihara
Independent
Elected Governor
Shintarō Ishihara
Independent

The 2007 Tokyo Gubernatorial elections were held on April 8, 2007, as part of the 16th unified local elections. There were fourteen candidates, among them the incumbent governor Shintaro Ishihara. Most candidates, with the exception of Kurokawa and Yamaguchi, ran as independents, but some were supported by various parties.

== Results ==
Gubernatorial election 2007: Tokyo
Party	Candidate	Votes	%	±%
LDP	Shintarō Ishihara	2,811,486	50.52	
DPJ, SDP	Shirō Asano	1,693,323	30.43	
JCP	Manzō Yoshida	629,549	11.31	
Symbiosis New Party	Kisho Kurokawa	159,126	2.86	
Independent	Yoshiro Nakamatsu	85,946	1.54	
Independent	Shigeki Satō	69,526	1.25	
Independent	Kumiko Uchikawa	21,626	0.39	
Independent	Kōichi Toyama	15,059	0.27	
Independent	Mitsuru Takahashi	5558	0.10	
Independent	Osamu Ogami	4020	0.07	
Independent	Setsuo Yamaguchi	3589	0.06	
Independent	Ryūhō Takashima	3240	0.06	
Independent	Sutoku Sasaki	2845	0.05	
Independent	Kōichirō Mariko	1373	0.02	
Turnout		5565127	54.35	
