= Zezi Ifore =

British broadcaster

- Born: 1 April 1985 (age 41); London, United Kingdom
- Occupations: Presenter, journalist
- Employer: Channel 4

Zezi Ifore (/ˈzeɪziː ˈaɪfɔːr/; born 1 April 1985), is a broadcaster and creative consultant from London.

== Early life ==
Born in London, England, UK of Nigerian heritage, Ifore attended Alleyns School in Dulwich, along with Jack Peñate. She studied French and Italian at Oxford University.

== Career ==
Ifore formed the DJ collective The Coconut Twins, performing and earning acclaim for their work, and both toured with M.I.A. during her KALA Tour in 2007. Ifore, has also styled other artists.

Ifore has contributed to publications including i-D and Dazed & Confused, and at the age of 18 was the fashion editor of Live magazine. By the age of 21, she was editor of Super Super magazine. She has since written for The Metro, The Guardian, Electronic Beats and Wad magazine.

Ifore, along with George Lamb, replaced Dermot O'Leary as the host of Big Brother's Little Brother when it returned on 5 June 2008 but was dropped for the 2009 series. Ifore also presented Channel 4's music show, Freshly Squeezed, and E4 Music.

Ifore has also worked as a marketing consultant and in A&R.
