= Freshly Squeezed =

- Created by: Remedy Productions
- Starring: Matt Edmondson; Jameela Jamil; Matt Littler; Darren Jeffries
- Country of origin: United Kingdom
- Original language: English

Production
- Running time: 30 minutes

Original release
- Network: Channel 4
- Release: 21 August 2006 – 21 December 2012

Freshly Squeezed is a British breakfast television programme which was broadcast every weekday morning on Channel 4 from August 2006 to December 2012.

== Format ==
The programme took the format of a music-based breakfast show, featuring studio performances, music videos and interviews.

The show was cancelled at the end of 2012.

== Presenters ==
As of the final episode, the presenters included:

- Phil Clifton
- Matt Edmondson
- Jameela Jamil
- Darren Jeffries
- Matt Littler

The programme was hosted by two main presenters on a weekly rotational basis, though Hollyoaks duo Jeffries and Littler presented the programme together. Interviews were normally pre-recorded and were sometimes conducted by one of the other presenters.

=== Former ===
Former hosts of the programme include:

- Alexa Chung
- Rick Edwards
- Nick Grimshaw
- Zezi Ifore
- George Lamb

=== Guest presenters ===
From time to time, a guest performer would join one of the regular hosts to present the programme for a week. Guest presenters included McFly, Kesha, Example and Chip.
