= Morganics =

Australian hip hop performer

Morgan Lewis, known as Morganics, is a Cairns-based hip hop performer.

Morganics started performing in Sydney in 1984 and was a member of Metabass'n'Breath who toured in Australia and the United States.

Morganics works around Australia on community educational hip-hop projects such as 1999's Desert Rap with Brothablack and Monkey Mark from South West Syndicate, organised with Tony Collins from Triple J. ABC TV made a documentary on Desert Rap. Another hip-hop program Morganics participated in was in Wilcania in 2002 where he recorded a group of local boys called The Wilcannia Mob. The resulting track, "Down The River" got high rotation on Triple J and won a Deadly award. The song was included on a CD of young Aboriginal hip hop artists recorded at workshops around Australia called All You Mob, which New York Times named in their top ten alternative albums of the year. He conducts these workshops as he feels it is important to give young people direct access to Australian hip hop.

Morganics has released five solo albums, his latest is "Music For My Friends And My Enemies". He also directed and acted in Australia's first ever hip hop feature film "Survival Tactics". (one of which contained second disc which was a followup to All You Mob) and worked with Miles Merrill on another. He has performed a live set for Triple J. He performs hip hop theatre shows such as Crouching Bboy Hidden Dreadlocks. "Stereotype" with Wire MC and "Survival Tactics" with a six-person cast.

== Discography ==
- Morganics - Invisible Forces... (2002) Independent/Creative Vibes
- Morganics - Evolve/All You Mob 2 (2003) Independent/Creative Vibes
- Morganics - Hip Hop is my Passport (2007) Independent/Creative Vibes
- Miles Merrill with Morganics - Dirty Curly (2008) Invisible Forces
- Shopfront Theatre for Young People & Morganics present - All You Mob! (2002) ABC
