= Jimmy (song) =

2007 song by M.I.A.

Single by M.I.A.

from the album Kala
- Released: 10 July 2007
- Genre: Disco; dance-pop; electropop; Eurodisco
- Length: 3:29
- Label: Interscope; XL Recordings
- Songwriters: Maya Arulpragasam; Dave Taylor; Bappi Lahiri
- Producers: M.I.A.; Switch

M.I.A. singles chronology
"Boyz" (2007)	"Jimmy" (2007)	"Paper Planes" (2008)

"Jimmy" is a song recorded by British artist M.I.A. for her second studio album, Kala (2007). The song was written by Maya "M.I.A." Arulpragasam, Dave "Switch" Taylor and Bappi Lahiri and produced by Switch and M.I.A..

A cover of "Jimmy Jimmy Jimmy Aaja" from the film Disco Dancer (1982), the song was re-arranged as an uptempo pop-electro tune with disco influences by modifying the orchestration, instrumentation and beats and the addition of original English lyrics for the single. During the recording and production sessions, M.I.A. and Switch wanted to create a dance-pop disco record using a song that the singer was familiar with from her childhood; the song's lyrics portray M.I.A. being invited by British journalist Ben Anderson on a date while covering a genocide tour across nations in Africa, and both eventually pursuing a romantic relationship.

The original Disco Dancer song "Jimmy Jimmy Jimmy Aaja" was itself inspired by the 1980 song "T'es OK" ("You're OK" for international markets) by French Eurodisco group Ottawan.

Following the moderate chart performance of "Boyz", "Jimmy" was released in Japan in July 2007 as the album's lead single, and the second single in other countries. XL Recordings distributed "Jimmy" in CD single, 7" and 12" formats in the UK on 10 November 2007, however the song leaked in the country prior to release while the singer was on tour. Despite this, the song topped the UK Indie Chart and charted in Greece and Japan where it was a major commercial success. The single began to gain traction on the US Billboard Hot Dance Club Songs chart, peaking at number twenty eight following nine weeks on the chart. "Jimmy" was well received by contemporary music critics, who cited its distinct 1970s style pop sound compared with most songs featured on the album, and complimented its hook and lyrical themes. The bassline has similarities with the hook of Blur's hit single "Girls & Boys".

Stylus magazine placed "Jimmy" at number 5 on their list of the "Top 50 Songs of 2007".

== Background ==
M.I.A. explained that "Jimmy Jimmy Aaja" was a track she used to dance to when she was a child. "My mum used to hire me out when I was a kid...as a party buffer.... 'Jimmy' was my track that I used to do my routine to. I had a little tape recorder, and a cloak and a cardboard cut out guitar, and that was my joint." Describing the recording and writing processes, she revealed that she had already recorded the strings and other parts of the song in India, but initially didn't attempt to do "Jimmy" when she was with co-producer Switch, explaining "I had to be drunk enough to be that disco. It all came together that week." The 1970s disco-pop style of the song stands in marked contrast with other songs on Kala. Stylus magazine placed "Jimmy" at number 5 on their list of the "Top 50 Songs of 2007".

"Jimmy" has been covered by the indie pop band Of Montreal.

== Chart performance ==
Following the moderate chart performance of "Boyz", "Jimmy" was released in Japan in July 2007 as the album's lead single, and the second single in other countries. XL Recordings distributed "Jimmy" in CD single, 7" and 12" formats in the UK on 10 November 2007, however the song leaked in the country prior to release while the singer was on tour. The song topped the UK Indie Chart and reached number sixty six on the UK Singles Chart. The song and music video became huge mainstream successes in Japan, reaching number four in the country. On 10 November 2007 the single reached number 49 in Greece, a position it maintained for two weeks. In February 2008, the single began to gain traction on the US Billboard Hot Dance Club Songs chart, peaking at number twenty eight following five weeks on the chart.

== Music video ==
The music video for "Jimmy" was directed by childhood friend Nezar Khammal. It premiered in Japan in July 2007, and was premiered elsewhere around the world in August, the month of her second album release Kala. The music video features M.I.A. dancing with a golden crown on her head, with eleven dancers dressed in yellow in an Indian fashion, all dancing a variation of the Thousand Hand Bodhisattva. Occasionally the video cuts to show M.I.A. dancing by herself and two other girls in a different style of clothing against a white backdrop.

The video has received some airplay on MuchMusic in Canada and Viva in Poland.

A slightly different version of the music video, using the Dan Carey Radio Mix of the song, was used to promote "Jimmy" in the UK and Italy.

== Track listings and formats ==
UK CD single

1. "Jimmy"
2. "Jimmy (DJ Eli Remix)"

UK 12" vinyl

1. "Jimmy"
2. "Jimmy (Instrumental)"
3. "Jimmy (DJ Eli Remix)"

UK 7" vinyl

1. "Jimmy"
2. "What I Got (Ruff Ruff Version)"

iTunes Digital Single

1. "Jimmy"
2. "Jimmy (Dan Carey Radio Mix)"
3. "Jimmy (DJ Eli Remix)"

== Charts ==
Chart (2007)	Peak position
Australia (ARIA)	153
Greece (IFPI Greece Top 50 Singles)	49
UK Singles (Official Charts)	66
UK Hip Hop/R&B (Official Charts)	6
UK Indie (Official Charts)	1
US Hot Dance Club Songs (Billboard)	28
