= Carri Munden =

English fashion designer

- Born: London, England
- Education: University of Westminster
- Label: CassettePlaya

Carri Munden is an English fashion designer. Born as Carri Munden, she is credited as Carri Mundane and CassettePlaya, her fashion label. She currently works as a stylist and creative director and lives in London.

== Career ==
Carri as cassette playa has presented her work four times at Fashion East MAN, an initiative for new menswear as part of London Fashion Week, and also showcased her work in a Pitti Immagine sponsored exhibition as part of the Milan Fashion Week. Her first MAN showcase was a film installation (MAN Fall/Winter 2006/07), then a show "L.S.I" for Spring/Summer 2007, followed by a film shown on the runway and then her "Future Primitive" show for Spring/Summer 2008.

Carri has collaborated with Nike on designs on 3 occasions. In collaboration with Nike, a Cassette Playa Nike Blazer Premium shoe was exclusively created and featured in her Spring/Summer 2008 show. It was then released in selected international stores in late 2008. 2009 saw the release of both a capsule collection of clothing - "Nike x Cassette Playa Rivalry Collection" and a cassette playa Nike Dunk shoe.

In addition to her line, Munden has worked as a stylist for music videos and tours. She says of those she works with, "We have the same references... I translate their sound into clothes." She met artist and friend Mathangi Arulpragasam while the latter was looking to include a subject in one of her films; she describes the two as "the only weirdos in west London" at the time.

Carri has worked with artists including M.I.A., 2NE1, Nicki Minaj, Skepta, Boy Better Know (JME modelled in the first cassetteplaya catwalk), Ruff Sqwad, MNEK, Mykki Blanco, Brooke Candy, Riff Raff (rapper) and Danny Brown Her designs have also been worn by Kanye West, Lil Wayne, Rita Ora and Rihanna.

Munden was a contributing fashion editor of Super Super magazine, contributor and stylist for i-D, and has collaborated with Nicola Formichetti of Dazed & Confused.

Munden has also styled and art directed Billionaire Boys Club lookbooks and an editorial shoot for Dazed & Confused, and "Dunk Be True", an exhibition in the East End of London, focusing on the iconic Nike Dunk, in which she also appeared. She was commissioned by M.I.A. to contribute artwork for her 2007 album Kala.

Munden graduated in fashion design at the University of Westminster.

In 2007, Munden was nominated for "Best Menswear Designer" at the British Fashion Awards, alongside Christopher Bailey and Alexander McQueen.

In 2008, she was named by Rolling Stone magazine as "Best Fashion Designer" of 2008 in their "Best of Rock" issue.

In July 2008, her work is presented in the "Fashion V Sport" exhibition at London's V&A (Victoria & Albert Museum).

International outlets where her clothes sell include Dover Street Market in London, Colette in Paris, SlamJam in Milan, Seven in New York, IT Hong Kong, and GR8 in Tokyo amongst others.

Munden was commissioned by Nintendo DS to provide vinyl and foil artwork rooted in customisation for the console's MySims world game. A 2008 live video jump-dance installation work at the Pitti Uomo in Florence, Italy was particularly well received -showcasing "street gang pixel warriors joined by Sci-fi grime boys" sporting varying garments.

In 2010, Munden appeared in a fashion-themed episode of series six of The Apprentice.

In February 2010 Carri collaborated with London College of Fashion to produce "The worlds first augmented reality fashion show". This was presented at Somerset House as part London Fashion Week

In September 2010 Carri created an interactive photobooth designed by KIN design and in collaboration with Onedotzero. "Inspired by Japanese purikura and clad in striking Cassette Playa fabric, the booth offered visitors the opportunity to create their own animated gif using 4 photographs taken inside the booth and overlaid with Cassette Playa graphics of their choice" This booth was also installed at barbican as part of Future Beauty: 30 Years of Japanese Fashion, the British Film Institute, Tate Britain and as part of Dazed Live by Dazed and Confused

Carri will be working on a "collaboration" with SHINee's Key in their next concert outfit, hopefully.

After a brief hiatus working on external design projects Carri Munden made a return in SS15 with the newest release from her label Cassette Playa. "The range is an exercise in eccentricity, decorated in bold, psychedelic prints and using meticulously chosen messaging to create a collection that is as distinct as it is astute"

A lot of Korean Idols wear her clothes like SHinee's Key and 2NE1

== Aesthetic ==
Influenced by her subjects' art, Munden has also cited several global traditions including '90s skater fashion, Japanese anime, African prints, neon, and '90s rave as influences in addition to animals, science and science fiction. She describes the CassettePlaya universe as "techno, primal, positive, tribal." CassettePlaya is known a pioneer of the new rave genre in fashion although CassettePlaya has distanced herself from the term, saying it is "Vacant in retro. It's just a marketing machine.... I guess it was a fun time but I'm more excited about what happens now. The next level – the next generation. There's a mood of neo-spiritualism and futurism that excites me." Her use of paw print fabrics and "evil looking animal masks" led some to describe her fashions as having "a certain wrath-of-Technoticlan vibe." She says "I draw really heavily from ancient hunting rituals, but my collection was also inspired by Eighties and Nineties skate culture...I wanted to bring that ancient Shamanic vibe to the city today." Aztec art was cited as inspiring her use of orange in early lines. She describes some of her designs as "quite cartoon" but that she has "no intention of making people look funny". Designing wear for men, she feels her designs make male wearers more 'masculinated', stating "You have to be hard to carry it off." Interested in video games, her most recent line references YouTube, text messaging and circuit bending, propelled by her desire to create a matrix with wearers "stepping into the gaming world with no way to get back out."
