= Lemur (input device) =

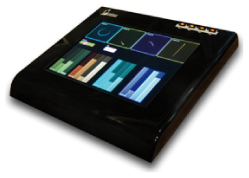
Lemur Control Surface

The Lemur was a highly customizable multi-touch device from French company JazzMutant founded by Yoann Gantch, Pascal Joguet, Guillaume Largillier and Julien Olivier in 2002, which served as a controller for musical devices such as synthesizers and mixing consoles, as well as for other media applications such as video performances. As an audio tool, the Lemur's role was equivalent to that of a MIDI controller in a MIDI studio setup, except that the Lemur used the Open Sound Control (OSC) protocol, a high-speed networking replacement for MIDI. The controller was especially well-suited for use with Reaktor and Max/MSP, tools for building custom software synthesizers.

== Creating an interface ==
The Lemur came with its own proprietary software called the JazzEditor to create interfaces. Users could build interfaces using a selection of 15 different objects (including fader, knobs, pads, sliders...), group them as modules and arrange them using as many pages as needed. Each object could then receive any MIDI or OSC attribute. A particularity of the Lemur was the ability to modify the physical behavior of each object (for instance adding or removing friction on faders).

The internal memory of the Lemur enabled the storage of many interfaces, each one controlling a specific software for instance.

== Discontinuation ==
JazzMutant discontinued production of the Lemur in 2010, citing competition from more mainstream multi-touch capable computers and tablets. The multi-touch interface was recreated as an iOS, macOS and Android app by the software company Liine (founded by Richie Hawtin).

In September 2022, Liine announced the discontinuation of the Lemur app.

== Users ==
The Lemur had been used by several famous artists.

- Alexander Hacke
- Richie Hawtin
- Matthew Herbert
- Kraftwerk
- Modeselektor
- Emilie Simon
- Daft Punk
- Joe Hahn
- Deadmau5

== See also ==
- Haptic technology
