= Koichi Toyama =

Japanese political activist (born 1970)

- 外山 恒一
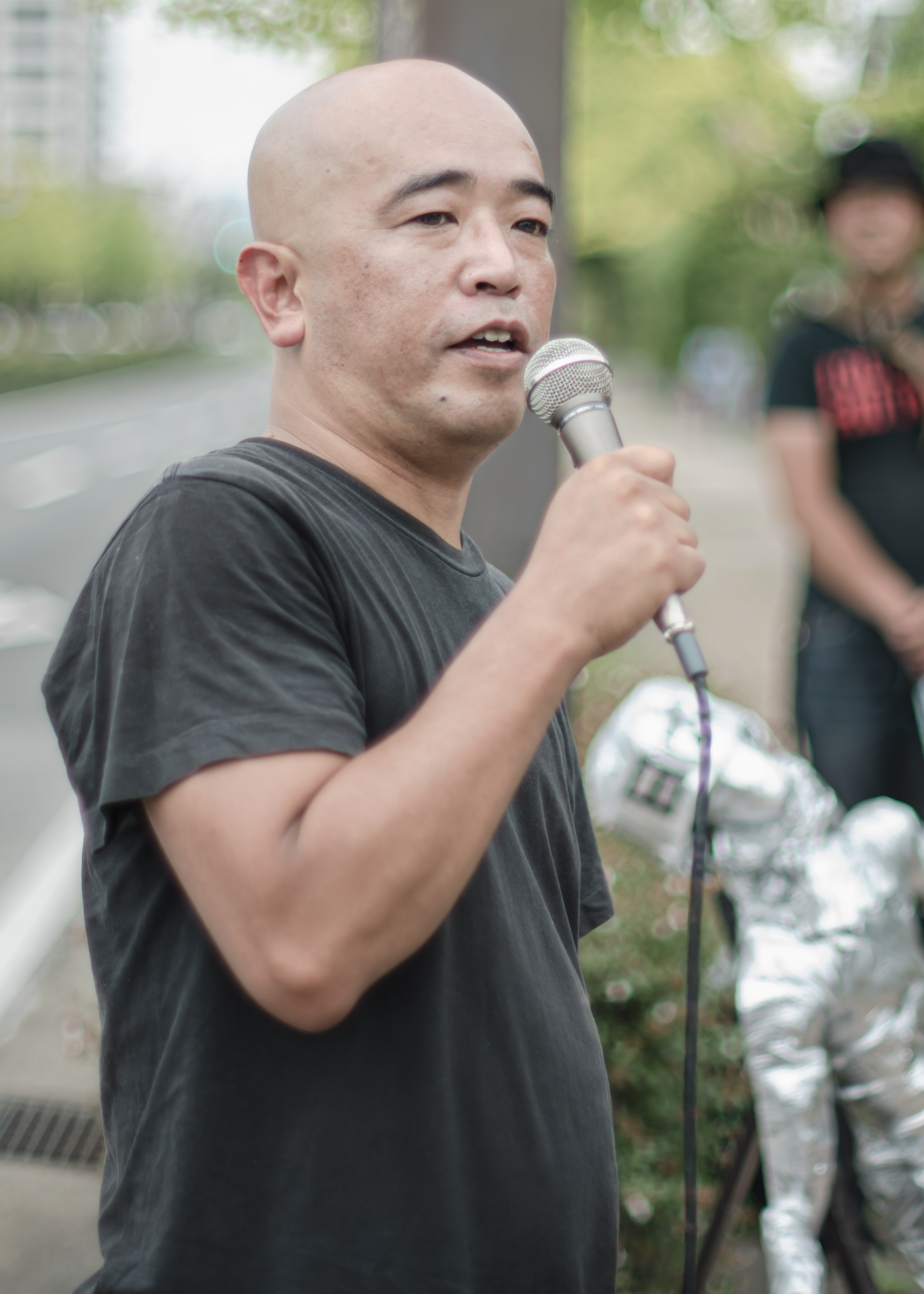
- Kohichi in 2017
- Born: July 26, 1970 (age 56); Kirishima, Kagoshima, Japan
- Occupation: Political activist

Koichi Toyama (Japanese: 外山 恒一, Hepburn: Toyama Kōichi; born July 26, 1970) is a Japanese street musician and a fringe political activist who was a candidate for the governor of Tokyo in the year 2007. He was born in Kagoshima Prefecture and lives in Fukuoka. He gained notoriety with his provocative 2007 Tokyo gubernatorial election speech.

== Background ==
While his background was an intense revolt against the formal high-school education system, he has been described as having a left-wing history and labeled a nihilist. Koichi has written several books. Toyama describes himself as a fascist.

== Gubernatorial campaign ==
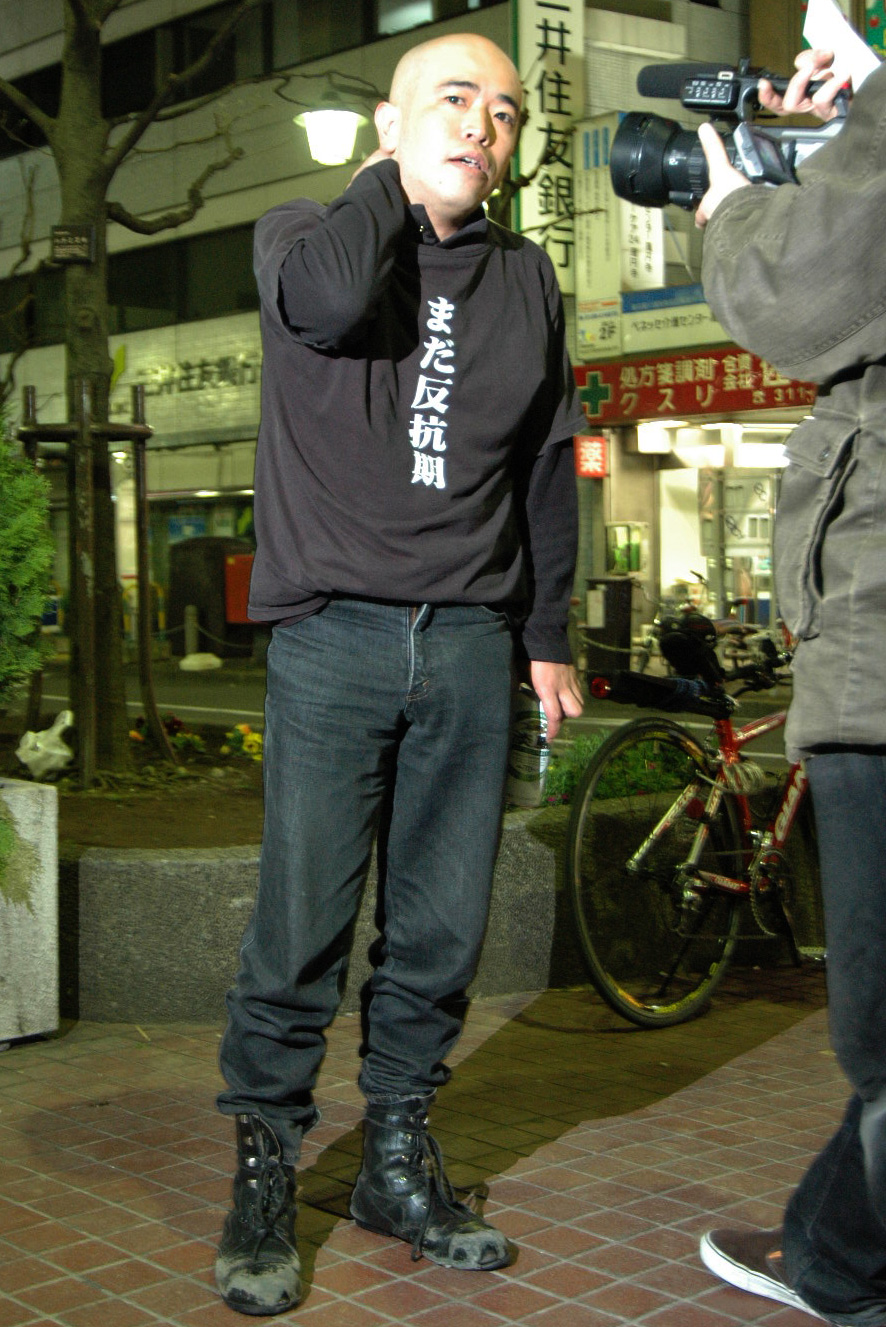
Kohichi during his 2007 campaign

As a candidate for Governor of Tokyo in 2007, Toyama Koichi was entitled to record a 5-minute televised campaign statement, during which he denounced majority rule and called upon Japan's political minority to join him in overthrowing the government.

In response to the viral spread of Toyama Koichi's statement online, the Tokyo election commission asked YouTube to remove election speeches of candidates, allegedly to "ensure fairness" among candidates, because YouTube had "allowed only certain candidates" speeches "to be viewed freely on the site", according to an election official. According to Japanese election law, the broadcasting of speeches is only allowed on public broadcaster NHK.

== Works ==
- 『ぼくの高校退学宣言—グッバイ・ハイスクール』 徳間書店 (Tokuma Shoten)、January 1989
- 『ハイスクール「不良品」宣言—反管理教育中高生ネットワーク・DPクラブの顛末』駒草出版、June 1990
- 『校門を閉めたのは教師か—神戸高塚高校校門圧殺事件』駒草出版、November 1990
- 『注目すべき人物—1970年生まれの「同世代」批判』ジャパンマシニスト社、November 1992
- 『さよならブルーハーツ—パンク日記』JICC出版局、April 1993
- 『見えない銃—外山恒一、孤軍奮闘の軌跡/だいたい全記録 』出版研、December 1995
- 『ヒット曲を聴いてみた—すると社会が見えてきた』駒草出版 、April 1998
- 『最低ですかーっ!—外山恒一語録』不知火書房、December 2004 ISBN 978-4883450664
- 『青いムーブメント―まったく新しい80年代史』彩流社、May 2008 ISBN 978-4779113369
- 『ポスト学生運動史―法大黒ヘル編 1985～1994』 彩流社、January 2010 ISBN 978-4779114878

=== Magazines ===
- 『デルクイ 01』 彩流社、February 2011 ISBN 978-4-7791-1563-9
- 『デルクイ 02』 彩流社、November 2013 ISBN 978-4779119378
