= FIFA Street 3 =

2008 video game

- Cover art featuring Gennaro Gattuso, Ronaldinho, and Peter Crouch
- Developers: EA Canada; Exient Entertainment (DS)
- Publisher: EA Sports BIG
- Series: FIFA Street
- Platforms: Xbox 360, PlayStation 3, Nintendo DS
- Release: NA: February 18, 2008; AS: February 18, 2008 (PS3, X360); KOR: February 20, 2008 (PS3, X360); EU: February 22, 2008; AU: February 28, 2008; JP: June 5, 2008 (PS3, X360)
- Genre: Sports
- Modes: Single-player, multiplayer

FIFA Street 3 is an arcade-style sports game for the Xbox 360, PlayStation 3 and Nintendo DS. It is the third game in the FIFA Street series from EA Sports BIG, and is the last title released under the brand. This game was followed up by the 2012 reboot of FIFA Street, but that game does not have EA Sports BIG sub-brand (it uses the standard EA Sports branding instead).

== Gameplay ==
The game's emphasis is on arcade-style fun and street football style tricks rather than real-life simulation. The game features more than 250 players from 18 different international teams. Players are identified by unique moves and show off their signature style of play. This enables gamers to experience "all the style and attitude" that is characteristic of street football. Enhancing this stylistic form of play are the exotic locations and interactive environments. Gamers are immersed in a "hyper-real world where players run up walls, environments pulsate to the music, and surroundings explode to life with each goal or trick."

== Development ==
It was developed under the EA Sports BIG division of EA Sports, which is also responsible for such titles as SSX, NBA Street, NFL Street, and the FIFA Street games. Electronic Arts confirmed that a third FIFA Street game was being developed for next-generation consoles to be released in 2008. A demo for FIFA Street 3 was released on 17 January 2008 on the Xbox Live marketplace for the Xbox 360 and on the PlayStation Store for the PlayStation 3. The cover features Brazilian star Ronaldinho, English star Peter Crouch, and Italian star Gennaro Gattuso. According to producer Joe Nickolls, these iconic players were chosen for the cover because they represent "three of the different types of players available in our game and we were able to exaggerate their qualities to really create larger-than-life-characters." The different types of players in the game are categorized as Tricksters, Playmakers, Finishers, and Enforcers.

== Reception ==
Reception

Aggregate scores
Aggregator	Score		
Aggregator	DS	PS3	Xbox 360
GameRankings	57.13%	63.96%	65.17%
Metacritic	56/100	63/100	63/100

Review scores
Publication	Score		
Publication	DS	PS3	Xbox 360
Electronic Gaming Monthly	N/A	4.67/10	4.67/10
Eurogamer	N/A	N/A	6/10
Game Informer	N/A	7/10	7/10
GamePro	N/A	N/A	3.5/5
GameRevolution	N/A	C−	C−
GameSpot	6/10	6.5/10	6.5/10
GameSpy	N/A	3.5/5	3.5/5
GameTrailers	N/A	6.2/10	6.2/10
GameZone	N/A	7/10	7/10
IGN	5.8/10	(US) 6.7/10 (UK) 5.7/10	(US) 6.7/10 (UK) 5.7/10
Official Xbox Magazine (US)	N/A	N/A	5/10
PlayStation: The Official Magazine	N/A	3.5/5	N/A

The game was met with mixed reception upon release. GameRankings and Metacritic gave it a score of 65% and 63 out of 100 for the Xbox 360 version; 64% and 63 out of 100 for the PlayStation 3 version; and 57% and 56 out of 100 for the DS version.
