= Gaana =

Music genre

- Stylistic origins: Tamil Sufi songs, siddhars of ancient Tamilakam, music of rural Tamil Nadu
- Cultural origins: North Chennai

Other topics
- Tamil film music

Gaana (or Gānā) is a genre of Tamil music, which is sung in the Madras Bashai dialect of Chennai, Tamil Nadu, India. It is rap-like "collection of rhythms, beats and sensibilities native to the Madras people." It evolved over the past two centuries, with influences ranging from the siddhars (tantric adepts) of ancient Tamilakam to rural Tamil folk music to Tamil Sufi mystics. Its popularity rose when it was brought to the music of the mainstream Tamil film industry. Contemporary gaana bands are bringing the genre to new audiences while using it for social activism, especially against caste discrimination.

== History ==
The term "gaanaa" is the colloquial word in Madras for "music", which is of Hindostani origin. In literary Tamil, the word Gaanam (கானம்) means "tune", and in modern Hindi–Urdu gānā means "song".

The genre arose in the slums and burial grounds of Madras. Gaana singers have performed in the city for the past two centuries. The art form can trace its descent from the siddhars (tantric adepts) of ancient Tamilakam, to the compositions of early nineteenth-century Tamil Muslim Sufi mystic Kunangudi Masthan Sahib, to Samuel Vedanayagam Pillai, popularly known as the first Tamil novelist. Kunangudi Masthan Sahib's songs are still sung by gaana singers today. Other strands of influence come from migrants from rural Tamil Nadu.

With the arrival of recording technology, gaana artists have been able to record their songs for posterity and earn income from them. In the 1990s, Composer Thenisai Thendral Deva brought Gaana-inspired songs to the Tamil film industry and was instrumental in introducing them to blockbusters like Kadhal Kottai. His Gaana tunes, which ruled the Tamil cinema space, earned him the recognition as the monarch of Gaana music. His Gaana songs encompassed all dimensions of music, blending religious and humanistic touches with themes of moral values, struggles, relationships, life principles, situational emotions, and philosophies on living. Even today, his songs remain popular and serve as reference material for many new composers and singers. This newfound exposure helped the genre gain popularity across college campuses and reach the lives of millennials. However, its spread beyond its traditional roots has drawn criticism from Gaana singers, who argue that the genre's original essence—its “angst and melancholy” born from everyday struggles—has been overshadowed by lighter themes of “fun and romance.”

Types of gaana songs include:

- attu gaana – popular film tunes adapted with original lyrics
- all gaana – songs with the major elements – tune, beats, lyrics – all created by the same artist
- jigil gaana – songs focused on intoxication and intoxicants
- deepa gaana – compositions from the past, some of which are ballads that run for hours
- marana gaana – an elegy exploring the philosophy of death

Scholars like V. Ramakrishnan of the Government Arts College, Ponneri, map twenty types of gaana songs. Other song types include those that glorify local heroes. The most famous of those is about Alththota Bhupathi, a poor worker. At times, the genre has been known to have sexual innuendo and misogyny, but many popular gaana singers reject these themes.

In gaana competitions, one singer questions another with a lyric, and the other answers with a lyric of their own. Participants aim to creatively "insist on life's instability".

Gaana songs are performed at weddings, stage shows, political rallies, and funerals. There are more than 500 performers in Chennai who earn their living from these events. In 2016, around one hundred gaana performers formed the South Indian Gana Singers Association to promote the art form, earn respect for their art, and prevent their work from being stolen. An earlier association, the Tamil Nadu Gana Artists Association was formed in 2007 and had 750 members as of 2012.

Gaana has been a vehicle for social activism. In 2018, a band of gaana artists was brought together by Pa. Ranjith, an Ambedkarite film-maker, to form The Casteless Collective. They sing against caste discrimination, about Ambedkar, the small joys of living in poverty in Chennai, and even have a lesbian song in their repertoire. Artists have also used gaana songs to transmit information like COVID-19 health guidelines in an easily-accessible form.

Though the major gaana artists are men, and gaana songs are usually written from a male viewpoint, women gaana artists are seeing increasing recognition. Isaivani, a member of The Casteless Collective, was recognised for her pioneering women's involvement in the genre with one of the BBC 100 Women Awards.

== Notable people ==
- Thenisai Thendral Deva
- Sabesh of Sabesh-Murali Duo
- Gana Punniyar
- Gana Palani
- Gana Ulaganathan
- Gana Bala
- Gana Sudhakar
- Isaivani
- The Casteless Collective
- Gana Vinoth
