= Dillon Francis discography =

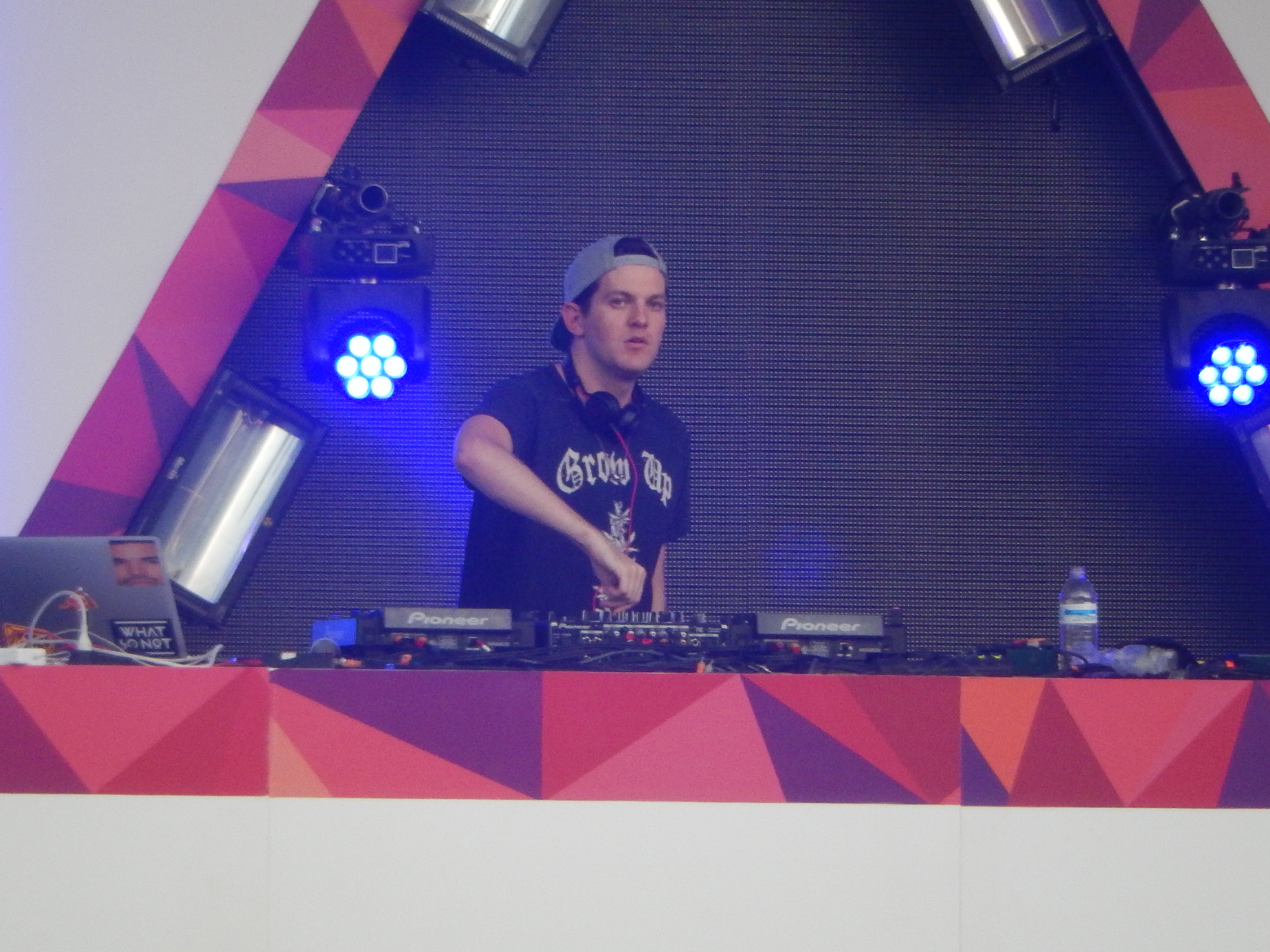
- Studio albums: 3
- EPs: 5
- Singles: 36

The discography of American electronic musician Dillon Francis consists of three studio albums, five extended plays (EPs), thirty-six singles and five other appearances.

His debut studio album Money Sucks, Friends Rule was released on October 27, 2014, via Columbia Records. It charted on the Billboard 200 at number 40 and has sold over 20,000 copies of certified units. It also peaked at number two on the US Dance/Electronic Albums chart and at number 33 in Australia. His second studio album Wut Wut was released on September 28, 2018, via IDGAFOS. "Get Low", a collaboration with DJ Snake, is Francis' only single to chart on the Billboard Hot 100, despite having a great portion of his singles to chart on the Dance/Electronic Songs chart. It was certified platinum in Canada and the United States. His single "Coming Over" with Kygo, from his 2015 mixtape This Mixtape Is Fire, was certified gold in the United States.

== Albums ==
=== Studio albums ===
List of studio albums, with selected details, peak chart positions and sales
| Title | Album details | Peak chart positions | | | | Sales |
| Title | Album details | US | US Dance | US Latin | AUS | Sales |
|---|---|---|---|---|---|---|
| Money Sucks, Friends Rule | Released: October 24, 2014; Label: Columbia; Formats: Digital download, CD | 40 | 2 | — | 33 | US: 20,000 |
| Wut Wut | Released: September 28, 2018; Label: IDGAFOS; Formats: Digital download, CD | — | — | 22 | — | |
| Happy Machine | Released: October 5, 2021; Label: IDGAFOS, Mad Decent; Formats: Digital download, streaming | — | — | — | — | |
"—" denotes a recording that did not chart or was not released.

=== Mixtapes ===
List of mixtapes, with selected details
| Title | Album details |
|---|---|
| Magic Is Real | Released: November 15, 2019; Label: IDGAFOS, Mad Decent; Format: Digital download, streaming |
| This Mixtape Is Fire Too | Released: December 1, 2023; Label: Astralwerks; Format: Digital download, streaming |

== Extended plays ==
List of extended plays
| Title | Details | Peak chart positions | | |
| Title | Details | US | US Dance | AUS |
|---|---|---|---|---|
| Swashbuckler | Released: September 3, 2010; Label: Play Me; Format: Digital download | — | — | — |
| Westside | Released: March 15, 2011; Label: Mad Decent; Format: Digital download | — | — | — |
| Something Something Awesome | Released: February 14, 2012; Label: OWSLA; Format: Digital download | — | — | — |
| This Mixtape Is Fire | Released: August 14, 2015; Label: Columbia; Formats: CD, digital download | 39 | 1 | 25 |
| Magic Is Real, Pt. 1 | Released: October 4, 2019; Label: IDGAFOS, Mad Decent; Formats: Digital download, streaming | — | — | — |
| Festival Bangers For When Festivals Start Again Because There Are No Festivals (with TV Noise) | Released: December 11, 2020; Label: Stmpd Rcrds; Formats: Digital download | — | — | — |
| Very Important Music | Released: May 14, 2021; Label: Mad Decent; Formats: Digital download, streaming | — | — | — |
| Cake and Cognac (with Yung Gravy) | Released: February 4, 2022; Label: Imperial; Formats: Digital download, streaming | — | — | — |
"—" denotes a recording that did not chart or was not released.

== Singles ==
List of singles as lead artist, with selected chart positions and certifications, showing year released and album name
| Title | Year | Peak chart positions | | | | | | | | | | Certifications | Album |
| Title | Year | US | US Dance | AUS | AUT | BEL | CAN | FRA | GER | SCO | UK | Certifications | Album |
|---|---|---|---|---|---|---|---|---|---|---|---|---|---|
| "IDGAFOS" | 2011 | — | — | — | — | — | — | — | — | — | — | | Non-album singles |
| "Without You" (with Totally Enormous Extinct Dinosaurs) | 2013 | — | 37 | — | — | — | — | — | — | — | — | | Non-album singles |
| "Get Low" (with DJ Snake) | 2014 | 61 | 5 | 44 | 55 | 58 | 48 | 93 | 79 | 64 | 88 | RIAA: Platinum; MC: Platinum | Money Sucks, Friends Rule |
| "When We Were Young" (with Sultan + Ned Shepard featuring The Chain Gang of 1974) | 2014 | — | 25 | — | — | — | — | — | — | — | — | | Money Sucks, Friends Rule |
| "I Can't Take It" | 2014 | — | 31 | — | — | — | — | — | — | — | — | | Money Sucks, Friends Rule |
| "We Make It Bounce" (featuring Major Lazer and Stylo G) | 2014 | — | 31 | — | — | 118 | — | — | — | — | — | | Money Sucks, Friends Rule |
| "Set Me Free" (with Martin Garrix) | 2014 | — | 24 | — | — | 107 | — | — | — | — | — | | Money Sucks, Friends Rule |
| "Love in the Middle of a Firefight" (featuring Brendon Urie) | 2014 | — | 45 | — | — | — | — | — | — | — | — | | Money Sucks, Friends Rule |
| "Bruk Bruk (I Need Your Lovin)" | 2015 | — | 38 | — | — | — | — | — | — | — | — | | This Mixtape Is Fire |
| "Bun Up the Dance" (with Skrillex) | 2015 | — | 44 | — | — | — | — | — | — | — | — | | This Mixtape Is Fire |
| "Coming Over" (with Kygo featuring James Hersey) | 2016 | — | 14 | — | — | — | — | — | — | — | — | RIAA: Gold | This Mixtape Is Fire |
| "Need You" (with NGHTMRE) | 2016 | — | 21 | — | — | — | — | — | — | — | — | | Non-album single |
| "Candy" (featuring Snappy Jit) | 2016 | — | — | — | — | — | — | — | — | — | — | | Non-album single |
| "Anywhere" (featuring Will Heard) | 2016 | — | 20 | — | — | — | — | — | — | — | — | | Non-album single |
| "Say Less" (featuring G-Eazy) | 2017 | — | 35 | — | — | — | — | — | — | — | — | | Non-album single |
| "Another Dimension" (with NGHTMRE) | 2017 | — | 30 | — | — | — | — | — | — | — | — | | NGHTMRE, Pt. II |
| "Hello There" (featuring Yung Pinch) | 2017 | — | 29 | — | — | — | — | — | — | — | — | | Non-album single |
| "Ven" (featuring Arcángel & Quimico Ultra Mega) | 2018 | — | — | — | — | — | — | — | — | — | — | | Wut Wut |
| "We the Funk" (featuring Fuego) | 2018 | — | 26 | — | — | — | — | — | — | — | — | | Wut Wut |
| "Sexo" (with Residente featuring iLe) | 2018 | — | — | — | — | — | — | — | — | — | — | | Wut Wut |
| "Bababa (Vete Pa'Ya)" (featuring Young Ash) | 2018 | — | 47 | — | — | — | — | — | — | — | — | | Wut Wut |
| "Quiero Saber" (with Jesse Baez) | 2018 | — | — | — | — | — | — | — | — | — | — | | Non-album single |
| "Look at That Butt" (featuring Jarina De Marco) | 2018 | — | — | — | — | — | — | — | — | — | — | | Wut Wut |
| "Never Let You Go" (featuring De La Ghetto) | 2018 | — | — | — | — | — | — | — | — | — | — | | Wut Wut |
| "White Boi" (featuring Lao Ra) | 2018 | — | 46 | — | — | — | — | — | — | — | — | | Wut Wut |
| "LFGD" (featuring Chris Melberger) | 2018 | — | — | — | — | — | — | — | — | — | — | | Ninjawerks Volume 1 |
| "Lost My Mind" (with Alison Wonderland) | 2019 | — | 23 | — | — | — | — | — | — | — | — | | Non-album single |
| "Catchy Song" (featuring T-Pain and That Girl Lay Lay) | 2019 | — | 19 | — | — | — | — | — | — | — | — | | The Lego Movie 2: The Second Part |
| "EDM O'Clock" (with TV Noise) | 2019 | — | — | — | — | — | — | — | — | — | — | | Non-album singles |
| "Change Your Mind" (featuring Lovelytheband) | 2019 | — | 34 | — | — | — | — | — | — | — | — | | Non-album singles |
| "Drip" (with Boombox Cartel featuring Desiigner) | 2019 | — | — | — | — | — | — | — | — | — | — | | Non-album singles |
| "Let It Go" (with Eptic) | 2019 | — | — | — | — | — | — | — | — | — | — | | Non-album singles |
| "Go Off (Nuthin’ 2 It)" | 2019 | — | 48 | — | — | — | — | — | — | — | — | | Magic Is Real |
| "Bawdy" (with TV Noise featuring Big Freedia) | 2019 | — | — | — | — | — | — | — | — | — | — | | Magic Is Real |
| "DFR" | 2019 | — | — | — | — | — | — | — | — | — | — | | Magic Is Real |
| "You Do You" (featuring BabyJake) | 2020 | — | 41 | — | — | — | — | — | — | — | — | | Non-album singles |
| "Touch" (with BabyJake) | 2020 | — | — | — | — | — | — | — | — | — | — | | Non-album singles |
| "Be Somebody" (featuring Evie Irie) | 2020 | — | 35 | — | — | — | — | — | — | — | — | | Non-album singles |
| "Unconditional" (with 220 Kid featuring Bryn Christopher) | 2021 | — | 35 | — | — | — | — | — | — | — | — | | Happy Machine |
| "Love Me Better" (with Shift K3Y featuring Marc E. Bassy) | 2021 | — | 15 | — | — | — | — | — | — | — | — | | Happy Machine |
| "Reaching Out" (featuring Bow Anderson) | 2021 | — | — | — | — | — | — | — | — | — | — | | Happy Machine |
| "Once Again" (with Vinne) | 2022 | — | — | — | — | — | — | — | — | — | — | | Non-album singles |
| "Move It" (with Valentino Khan) | 2022 | — | 15 | — | — | — | — | — | — | — | — | | Non-album singles |
| "Don't Let Me Let Go" (with Illenium and Evan Giia) | 2022 | — | 15 | — | — | — | — | — | — | — | — | | This Mixtape Is Fire Too |
| "Goodies" | 2022 | — | — | — | — | — | — | — | — | — | — | | This Mixtape Is Fire Too |
| "Pretty People" (with INJI) | 2023 | — | — | — | — | — | — | — | — | — | — | | This Mixtape Is Fire Too |
| "Pretty Low" (with Galantis and Arden Jones) | 2024 | — | — | — | — | — | — | — | — | — | — | | Non-album singles |
| "Caught in a Moment" | 2024 | — | — | — | — | — | — | — | — | — | — | | Non-album singles |
| "Hate Me" (with nothing,nowhere., Sorry My Love and Albert Hype) | 2025 | — | — | — | — | — | — | — | — | — | — | | Non-album singles |
| "Bring the House Down" (with DJ Snake and Trxggx) | 2025 | — | — | — | — | — | — | — | — | — | — | | Nomad |
| "Louder" (with Viperactive) | 2025 | — | — | — | — | — | — | — | — | — | — | | Non-album singles |
| "What It Feels Like" (with Daya) | 2026 | — | — | — | — | — | — | — | — | — | — | | Non-album singles |
"—" denotes a recording that did not chart or was not released.

== Other appearances ==
List of other album appearances
| Title | Year | Album |
|---|---|---|
| "Here 2 China" (with Calvin Harris featuring Dizzee Rascal) | 2012 | 18 Months and The Fifth |
| "Someone to Die For" (with Example) | 2012 | The Evolution of Man |
| "I'm the One" (Flux Pavilion featuring Dillon Francis) | 2013 | Freeway |
| "Dolphins on Wheels" (with Kill the Noise) | 2015 | Occult Classic |
| "Shut It Down" (with Party Favor) | 2016 | Party & Destroy |
| "Underwater" (with Meghan Trainor) | 2020 | Treat Myself |
| "Bring The House Down" (with DJ Snake and TRXGGX) | 2025 | Nomad |

== Remixes ==
- Elvis Presley — "Do the Vega" (Dillon Francis Remix)
- Dixie D'Amelio — "Be Happy" (Dillon Francis Remix)
- Saweetie - "My Type" (Dillon Francis Remix)
- Cardi B, Bad Bunny and J Balvin — "I Like It" (Dillon Francis Remix)
- Martin Solveig — "My Love" (Dillon Francis Remix)
- Excision and Dion Timmer – "Final Boss" (Dillon Francis Remix)
- Daft Punk — "Harder, Better, Faster, Stronger" (Dillon Francis Remix)
- J Balvin and Willy William — "Mi Gente" (Dillon Francis Remix)
- Justin Timberlake and Jay-Z — "Suit & Tie" (Dillon Francis Remix)
- Halsey — "Bad at Love" (Dillon Francis Remix)
- Gym Class Heroes and Adam Levine — "Stereo Hearts" (Dillon Francis Remix)
- Maroon 5 — "Memories" (Dillon Francis Remix)
- Sofi Tukker — "Purple Hat" (Dillon Francis Remix)
- W&W — "Bigfoot" (Dillon Francis Remix)
- deadmau5 — "Some Chords" (Dillon Francis Remix)

== Production and songwriting discography ==
- Nicki Minaj featuring Foxy Brown - Coco Chanel (2018)
- Nicki Minaj - Inspirations (Outro) (2018)
- Panic at the Disco - Hey Look Ma, I Made It (2019)
- Yung Gravy - Betty (Get Money) (2022)
