= We Make It Bounce =

Single by Dillon Francis and Major Lazer featuring Stylo G

from the album Money Sucks, Friends Rule
- Released: 16 September 2014
- Recorded: 2013
- Genre: Electro house; dancehall; moombahton
- Length: 4:10
- Label: Mad Decent; Columbia
- Songwriter(s): Dillon Francis; Jason Andre McDermott
- Producer(s): Dillon Francis; Diplo; Jillionaire; Walshy Fire

Dillon Francis singles chronology
"I Can't Take It" (2014)	"We Make It Bounce" (2014)	"Set Me Free" (2014)

Major Lazer singles chronology
"Come On to Me" (2014)	"We Make It Bounce" (2014)	"Lean On" (2015)

Stylo G singles chronology
"Come Over" (2014)	"We Make It Bounce" (2014)	"My Number 1 (Love Me, Love Me, Love Me)" (2015)

"We Make It Bounce" is a song by American electronic music producer Dillon Francis and American EDM trio Major Lazer, featuring guest vocals from English-Jamaican reggae singer Stylo G. The song was written by Dillon Francis and Stylo G, with production handled by Dillon Francis and Major Lazer. The song was released as a digital download by Mad Decent and Columbia Records on 16 September 2014, and is the fourth single of Dillon Francis debut album Money Sucks, Friends Rule. The song is written by Dillon Francis and Stylo G, with production handled by Dillon Francis and Major Lazer.

== Background ==
Dillon Francis announced that he was working with electronic music trio Major Lazer and reggae singer Stylo G, for Dillon Francis's debut album's fourth single "We Make It Bounce". Francis already released the song on 16 September 2014, on digital stores and streaming services like Spotify, Deezer, iTunes, Google Play and Amazon . The song also marks the second collaboration between American DJs Dillon Francis and Diplo.

On 15 March 2011, Francis released an EP named "Westside EP", and it consists of five tracks. For the third track of the EP, Dillon Francis worked with DJ Diplo and American singer Maluca to the release of the song, and it's named "Que Que". That marks the first time that Dillon Francis worked with Diplo.

When Diplo announced that the Major Lazer trio would collaborate with Francis on a new song, he also announced that he is working on a Major Lazer third studio album Peace is the Mission. He said that he has been working with a lot of people the last couple of years, and he was pulling all the favors for that record for sure.

== Chart performance ==
=== Weekly charts ===
Chart (2014)	Peak position
Belgium (Ultratip Bubbling Under Flanders)	68
US Hot Dance/Electronic Songs (Billboard)	31

== Release history ==
Region	Date	Format	Label
United States	16 September 2014	Digital download	Mad Decent; Columbia
