= Dave Nada =

American DJ

David Villegas, better known professionally as Dave Nada, is an Ecuadorian-American DJ and producer credited with creating the fusion-genre moombahton. He is a member of the production and DJ duo Nadastrom and co-founder of Hermanito Label along with Jesse Tittsworth.

== Career ==
Originally from College Park, Maryland, Nada started as a radio DJ while going to college at the University of Maryland for 88.1 WMUC which led to his interest in production and being a DJ. In the early 2000s, Nada met Jesse Tittsworth through a mutual friend and was invited to spin at his party, Crunk, in Washington D.C. He went on to host TaxLo in Baltimore. In 2007 Tittsworth introduced Nada to Matt Nordstrom with whom he formed the DJ and production duo Nadastrom which was the forefront of his career for a decade. Nada's sets and productions notably include electro, house, Baltimore club, moombahton, punk, hip-hop, and Latin and folkloric elements and influences.

Nada and Nordstrom have collaborated with and remixed for Diplo, Skrillex, Dillon Francis, Celia Cruz, Kanye West, Kid Cudi, Nina Sky, Steve Aoki, Kid Sister, Munchi, Tittsworth and MULA.

=== Moombahton ===
Nada is credited with creating the house and reggaeton fusion-genre Moombahton. In November 2009 while DJing a high school house party he slowed down Afrojack's dutch house remix of 'Moombah' by Chuckie & Silvio Ecomo to a midtempo of 108 BPM in order to better match the slower reggaeton, bachata, and other Latin music present at the party. It took hold with the young audience at the party so Nada returned home to create slowed down edits of other dutch house tracks, shared them with other DJs and named the sound 'Moombahton' - a portmanteau of 'Moombah' and reggaeton.

Nadastrom and DJ Sabo went on to launch Moombahton Massive - a series of parties supporting the genre and associated music movement.

== Selected discography ==
As Dave Nada:

Albums and Extended Plays:

- Kick out the Jams EP (2007, T&A Records)
- Blow Your Head, Vol. 2: Dave Nada Presents Moombahton [curator] (2011, Mad Decent)

Singles and Appearances:

- Brazzer's Theme (Dillon Francis & Dave Nada) (2011, Mad Decent)
- Te Encontré (Tittsworth & Dave Nada feat. MULA) (2019, Hermanito)

Remixes:

- Celia Cruz - La Dicha Mía (Dave Nada remix) (2017, Fania)
- Waka Flocka Flame - No Hands (feat. Wale Roscoe Dash) (Dave Nada remix)
- Henry Wu - Negotiate (Dave Nada Remix) (2019, Apocalipsis)

With Nadastrom:

Albums and Extended Plays:

- Pussy EP (Dubsided)
- The Saved EP (Dubsided)
- El Baile Diabluma (2011, Scion A/V)
- Nadastrom (2015, Friends of Friends)

Singles and Appearances:

- Fired Up (T&A)

Remixes:

- Designer Drugs - Back Up In This (IHEARTCOMIX)
- DJ Gant-Man - Juke Dat Girl (Fool’s Gold)
- Edu K - Raver Lovin (Sweat It Out!)
- Estelle feat. Kanye West - American Boy (White Label)
- Kid Cudi feat. Kanye West & Common - Make Her Say (Fool’s Gold)
- Laidback Luke and Diplo - Hey! (Dim Mak)
- Lil Wayne - A Milli (White Label)
- Pase Rock - Nights (Dim Mak)
- Shiny Toy Guns - Ricochet (Universal)
- Tittsworth feat. Kid Sister and Pase Rock - WTF (Plant Music)
- Tittsworth feat. Nina Sky and Pitbull - Here He Comes (Plant Music)
