= I Can't Take It (Dillon Francis song) =

Single by Dillon Francis

from the album Money Sucks, Friends Rule
- Released: August 25, 2014
- Genre: Trap; moombahton; big room house
- Length: 4:23
- Label: Island
- Songwriter(s): Dillon Francis
- Producer(s): Dillon Francis

Dillon Francis singles chronology
"When We Were Young" (2014)	"I Can't Take It" (2014)	"We Make It Bounce" (2014)

Music video
- "I Can't Take It" on YouTube

"I Can't Take It" is a song by American record producer and EDM artist Dillon Francis. The song was released, as the third single of Francis debut album Money Sucks, Friends Rule on 25 August 2014. The song was entirely produced and written by Francis. Unlike his previous singles, the song doesn't have an official video, but on 28 August 2014, three days after the song was released, Francis shared in YouTube an official lyric video for the song.

== Background ==
On 22 August 2014, Dillon Francis announced a new song called "I Can't Take It", a single from his upcoming debut album Money Sucks, Friends Rule. Unlike the two previous singles, for this time Francis didn't collaborate or feature another artist and he worked alone to the release of this single. Francis said that he like the distorted vocals of the song as well as the more mid-tempo sound and funky bass that he delivered to the release of the song.

On 28 August, the lyric video for the song was released by Francis on his YouTube channel. The video is animated, the animation was inspired of the American sitcom South Park, the floppy headed Canadians. The video includes various objects singing, like a donut, chicken, a dog, a bread and a broccoli.

A year later, Francis announces his fifth EP called "This Mixtape Is Fire". The remixed version of "I Can't Take It" by Party Favor, was released on 17 July 2015, and it was later included in the EP "The Mixtape Is Fire" which was later released on 14 August 2017 as seventh and last track of the EP.

== Lyrics and composition ==
The lyrics, of the entire song only consists with the following words "I can't take it no more, let's f**king lose it". In the song, Francis tries to show that things do not last forever, and that at some point they will be lost forever. The song is a big room house single in which combines the rhythm of the moombahton and trap genres. The song is the eight track of Dillon Francis album "Money Sucks, Friends Rule".

== Chart performance ==
=== Weekly charts ===
Chart (2014)	Peak position
US Hot Dance/Electronic Songs (Billboard)	31

== Release history ==
Region	Date	Format	Label
United States	25 August 2014	Digital download	Mad Decent; Columbia
