= U Street Music Hall =

Dance club and music venue in Washington, D.C.

Coordinates: 38°55′1.9″N 77°1′39.8″W

- U Hall

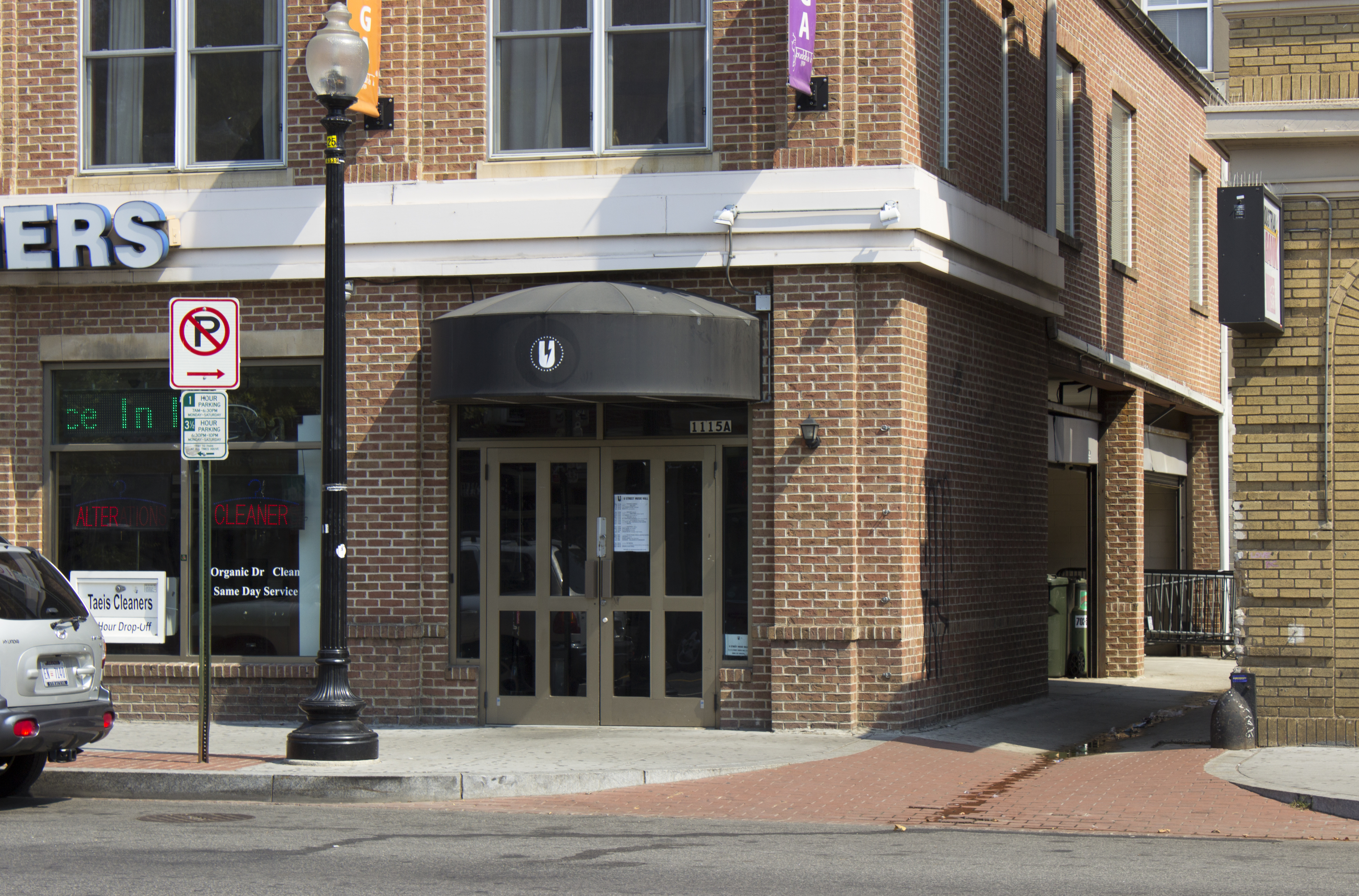
- Interactive map of U Street Music Hall
- Public transit: Washington Metro at U Street

Construction
- Opened: 2010
- Closed: 2020

U Street Music Hall was a dance club and live music venue founded in 2010 and located in the U Street Corridor of Washington, D.C. Artists and DJs booked at U Street Music Hall spanned the spectrum of electronic music, including house, disco, techno, bass and electro. It was often referred to as "U Hall".

== Overview ==
Opened March 17, 2010 by founders Jesse Tittsworth and Will Eastman, U Street Music Hall was a DJ-owned and operated basement dance club and live music venue. Its 500-person capacity room featured a state-of-the-art Martin Audio sound system, a 1,200 square foot cork-cushioned dance floor and two bars. Of its atmosphere, a 2010 Washington Post review stated, U Street Music Hall -- U Hall to its friends -- ditches most of the trappings associated with D.C. nightclubs. No dress code. No bottle service. No party photographers. No VIP areas, or seating more complex than bar stools. Just a huge room with a DJ booth at one end, a stage at the other and bars along the sides. It's a black box theater that lets DJs focus on the music.

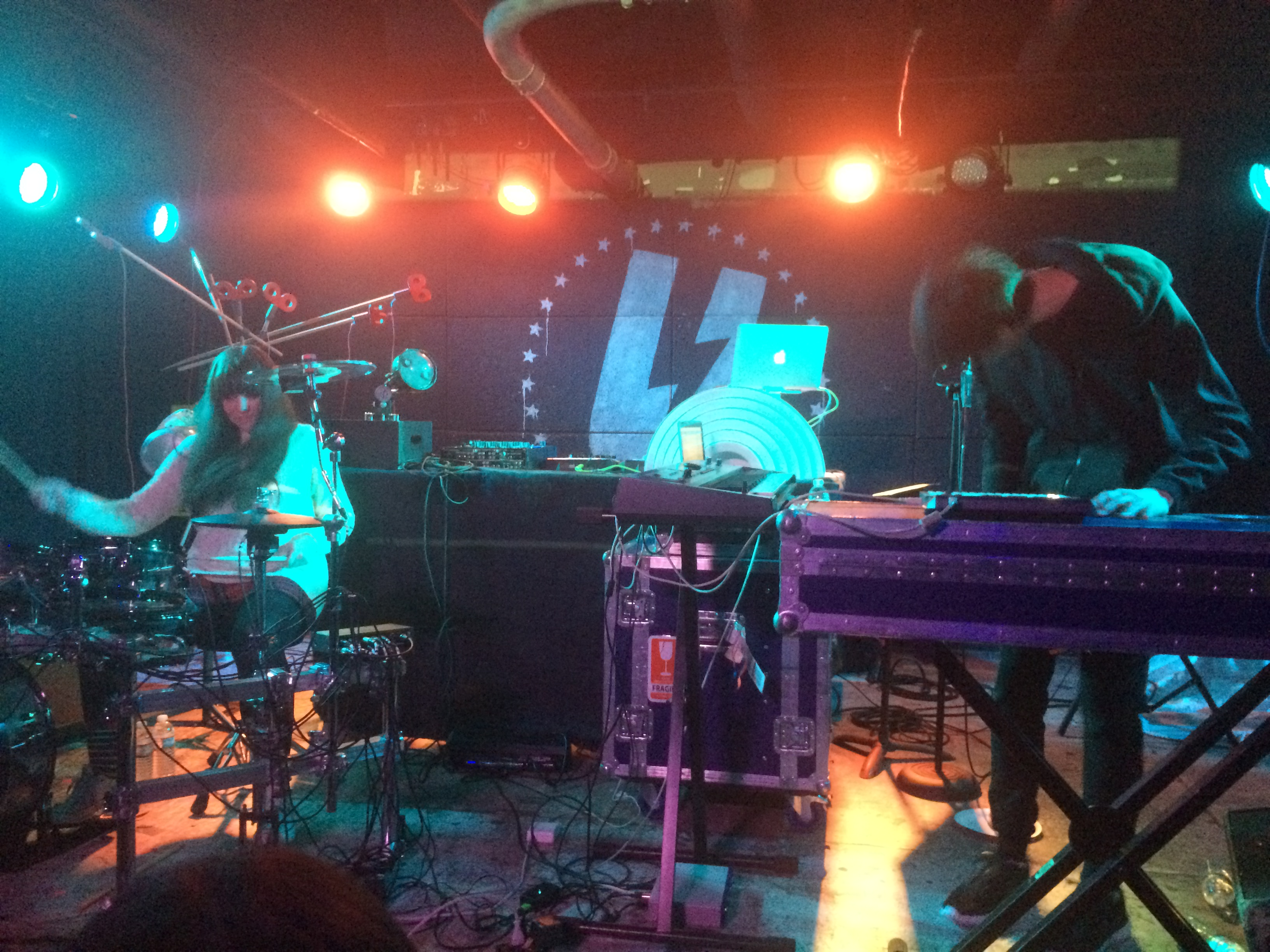
Tennyson performing at U Street Music Hall in Washington, D.C.

U Street Music Hall hosted the Washington D.C. debuts of Disclosure, Hudson Mohawke, Rudimental, Flume, RL Grime, Aeroplane, Joy Orbison, Fred Falke, Kiesza, Sam Smith, Jess Glynne, Rita Ora and Nina Kraviz, among many others. The venue also hosted several underplays, including Kaskade during his 2013 Redux Tour, two back-to-back nights with Swedish pop singer Robyn and two surprise club appearances from Skrillex.

U Street Music Hall announced on October 5, 2020, that it was closing immediately due to hardships caused by the COVID-19 pandemic.

== Club nights ==
Red Friday nights at the club were a tribute to the former D.C. afterhours venue Red, featuring artists who frequented that club. U Street Music Hall was also the birthplace of the first Moombahton Massive, and Massives were held every month at the club. Residents Nadastrom and Sabo spun every Massive, alongside special guests including Tittsworth, Craze and Munchi. In January 2012, Moombahton pioneer Dave Nada proposed marriage to his wife, fellow DJ Jen Lasher, in the DJ booth at Moombahton Massive XI.

Will Eastman, principal owner and music director of U Street Music Hall, headed an emerging electronic music monthly party Bliss, featuring forward-looking international and local guests such as Green Velvet, Tiga, Danny Daze, and Orchard Lounge. Founded in 2000 and first held at the now defunct Metro Cafe, then for eight years at the Black Cat, Bliss moved to U Street Music Hall upon its opening in March 2010 and is one of Washington D.C.'s longest standing dance parties.

In November 2011, U Street Music Hall and the 9:30 Club formed a booking alliance, resulting in the 9:30 Club hosting live early shows at U Street Music Hall, while U Street Music Hall booked weekends at Backbar (located in the basement of the 9:30 Club) and larger acts in the 9:30 Club main room.

U Street Music Hall founded the U Street Music Foundation in 2011, supporting music education programs and events for Ward 1 and Washington D.C. area youth.

== Awards ==
- "Best Place to go Dancing" (Washington Post Express, 2010)
- "6th Best Dance Club" (Club Planet, 2011)
- "Best Dance Club" (Washington City Paper Reader's Choice, 2012)
- "Second Best Sound System in America" (Beatport, 2012)
- "Best Underground Music Venue" (Washington City Paper Reader's Choice, 2013)
- "Best Dance Floor" (Washington City Paper Reader's Choice, 2013)
- "Best Place to Find an Underground Dance Party" (Washington City Paper Reader's Choice, 2013)
- "#10 Best Club in America" (Rolling Stone Magazine, 2013)

== See also ==
- List of electronic dance music venues
