= IDGAFOS =

Single by Dillon Francis
- Released: October 18, 2011
- Length: 4:08
- Label: Mad Decent
- Songwriter: Dillon Francis
- Producer: Dillon Francis

Dillon Francis singles chronology
| "IDGAFOS" (2011) | "Money Makin'" (2012) |

Music video
- "IDGAFOS" on YouTube

"IDGAFOS" (an acronym for "I Don't Give a Fuck or Shit") is the debut single by American record producer Dillon Francis, released on October 18, 2011 through Mad Decent. It contains a heavily distorted sample of Adam Levine's vocals from "Stereo Hearts" by Gym Class Heroes (which Francis had previously released an official remix for). The song marked the start of Francis' breakthrough, topping Hype Machine's "Most Popular Tracks" chart. It was featured on the fifth episode of Avicii's Levels podcast.

== Alternate versions ==
Francis has also released two alternate versions of the track.

The first, titled "IDGAFOS 2.0", is an updated "VIP" version which featured most of the same elements as the original with an edited intro and outro. It was released as a free download through Facebook on February 15, 2012 and later published to his SoundCloud page on March 7, 2012.

The second, titled "Flight 4555 (IDGAFOS 3.0)", is 15 minutes in length and was slowed down to 30 BPM. This version was released as a purchasable download through Mad Decent on July 16, 2013. A nine-minute video was also released for the track.

== Appearances in popular media ==
- The song was featured in 2013 video game Saints Row IV on the dubstep and trap station, Mad Decent 106.9.
- In 2014, "IDGAFOS" was featured in a Beats Music advertisement for the Super Bowl in which Ellen DeGeneres danced to the song.

== Track listing ==
Digital download
| No. | Title | Length |
|---|---|---|
| 1. | "IDGAFOS" | 4:08 |
| 2. | "Beautician 2.0" | 4:04 |
