= Money Sucks, Friends Rule =

Studio album by Dillon Francis
- Released: October 24, 2014
- Recorded: 2013–2014
- Genre: Electro house; EDM; synth-pop; trap; moombahton
- Length: 45:22
- Label: Mad Decent; Columbia
- Producer: Dillon Francis; Ammo; Billboard; KSHMR; Martin Garrix; Major Lazer; Oligee; DJ Snake; Sultan + Ned Shepard; TJR

Dillon Francis chronology
Money Sucks, Friends Rule (2014)	This Mixtape Is Fire (2015)

Singles from Money Sucks, Friends Rule
- 1. "Get Low" Released: February 11, 2014; 2. "When We Were Young" Released: August 5, 2014; 3. "I Can't Take It" Released: August 25, 2014; 4. "We Make It Bounce" Released: September 16, 2014; 5. "Set Me Free" Released: October 7, 2014; 6. "Love in the Middle of a Firefight" Released: October 16, 2014; 7. "Not Butter" Released: June 22, 2015

Professional ratings
Review scores
Source	Rating
AllMusic	3.5/5 stars
Slant Magazine	3/5 stars
Pitchfork	3.9/10 stars

Money Sucks, Friends Rule is the debut studio album by Dillon Francis, an American electronic music producer known for being one of the pioneers of moombahton and moombahcore. The album features collaborations from artists such as Major Lazer, Martin Garrix, Mad Decent label-mate DJ Snake, rapper Twista, Panic! at the Disco's Brendon Urie and more. It was released on October 24, 2014, on Mad Decent in collaboration with Columbia Records.

The album debuted on Billboard 200 at No. 40, and No. 2 on the Dance/Electronic Albums chart, selling 9,000 copies in its first week. The album has sold 20,000 copies in the US as of July 2015.

== Background ==
In 2013, Francis announced in a headlining Wurld Turr that he was working on a debut album and that it's set to be released on 2014. On April 22, 2014, he announced the name of his album Money Sucks, Friends Rule, and on August 5, 2014, he revealed the released date of the album.

On March 22, 2014, Francis announced via his official Twitter account that his debut album, entitled Money Sucks, Friends Rule, would be released on October 27, 2014, on Mad Decent and Columbia Records.

== Singles ==
"Get Low" was released as the album's lead single on 11 February 2014, with the collaboration of French DJ and producer DJ Snake. On April 4, 2015, a remix featuring Rae Sremmurd was released.

"When We Were Young" with the collaboration of Sultan + Ned Shepard featuring The Chain Gang of 1974 was released as the album's second single on 5 August 2014.

"I Can't Take It" was released on 25 August 2014, as the third single of the album.

"We Make It Bounce" was released with the collaboration of electronic music trio Major Lazer, featuring reggae singer Stylo G on 16 September 2014, as the album's fourth single.

“Set Me Free” was released on 7 October 2014, as the album's fifth single with the collaboration of Dutch DJ Martin Garrix.

"Love in the Middle of a Firefight" was released as the sixth single of the album, on 16 October 2014, featuring Panic! at the Disco member Brendon Urie.

"Not Butter" was released as the album's seventh and final single, on 22 June 2015.

=== Other songs ===
A music video for "All That" featuring Twista and The Rej3ctz was released on 26 October 2015 and appeared in the horror comedy film Scouts Guide to the Zombie Apocalypse, which Francis also stars in the film.

== Track listing ==
No.	Title	Writer(s)	Producer(s)	Length
1.	"All That" (featuring Twista and The Rej3ctz)	Dillon Francis; Niles Hollowell-Dhar; Petros Anastos-Prastacos; Warren Ben Baker; Carl Terrell Mitchell; Leroy Barnes; Jovan Clayton	Dillon Francis; KSHMR	3:09
2.	"Get Low" (with DJ Snake)	Steve Guess; Dillon Francis; William Sami Etienn Grigahcine	Dillon Francis; DJ Snake	3:32
3.	"When We Were Young" (with Sultan + Shepard featuring The Chain Gang of 1974)	Dillon Francis; Ned Shepard; Ossama Al-Sarraf; Kamtin Mohager	Dillon Francis; Sultan + Ned Shepard	3:19
4.	"Set Me Free" (with Martin Garrix)	Dillon Francis; Martijn Garritsen	Dillon Francis; Martin Garrix	4:07
5.	"Drunk All the Time" (featuring Simon Lord)	Dillon Francis; Oliver Goldstein; Simon Williams Lord	Dillon Francis	3:47
6.	"Love in the Middle of a Firefight" (featuring Brendon Urie of Panic! at the Disco)	Dillon Francis; Mathieu Jomphe-Lepine; Joshua Coleman; Brendon Urie	Dillon Francis; Billboard; Ammo	3:19
7.	"Not Butter"	Dillon Francis	Dillon Francis	4:01
8.	"I Can't Take It"	Dillon Francis	Dillon Francis	4:22
9.	"We Are Impossible" (featuring The Presets)	Dillon Francis; Oliver Goldstein; Julian Thomas Hamilton	Dillon Francis; Oligee^{[a]}	3:35
10.	"We Make It Bounce" (with Major Lazer featuring Stylo G)	Dillon Francis; Thomas Wesley Pentz; Jason Andre McDermott	Dillon Francis; Major Lazer	4:10
11.	"What's That Spell" (featuring TJR)	Dillon Francis; Thomas Joseph Rozdilsky	Dillon Francis; TJR	4:26
12.	"Hurricane" (featuring Lily Elise)	Dillon Francis; Dan Nigro; Oliver Goldstein; Leah Hayes	Dillon Francis; Oligee^{[a]}	3:35
Total length:				45:22

Japanese Edition bonus tracks
No.	Title	Length
13.	"Get Low (Remix)" (with DJ Snake featuring Rae Sremmurd)	3:34
14.	"Get Low (Rebirth in Paris)" (with DJ Snake)	3:05
15.	"When We Were Young (Grandtheft Remix)" (with Sultan + Shepard featuring The Chain Gang of 1974)	3:56
16.	"Drunk All The Time (The Rebirth)" (featuring Simon Lord)	3:41

Digital bonus track
No.	Title	Length
13.	"Get Low (Remix)" (with DJ Snake featuring Rae Sremmurd)	3:34

Notes

- ^{^[a]} signifies an additional producer

== Charts ==
Chart (2014)	Peak position
Australian Albums (ARIA)	33
Australian Dance Albums (ARIA)	4
UK Albums (OCC)	188
UK Dance Albums (OCC)	7
US Billboard 200	40
US Top Dance Albums (Billboard)	2
