= Coming Over =

Coming Over may refer to:

- "Coming Over", song by Chuck Fenda ft. Cherine Anderson #1 on the Jamaican charts 2006
- "Coming Over", a song by Self from their album Ornament & Crime, 2017
- "Coming Over" (Exo song), Japanese song by Exo 2016
- "Coming Over" (Dillon Francis and Kygo song), 2016 song based on "Coming Over" by James Hersey 2014
