= I Can't Take It =

I Can't Take It may refer to:

- "I Can't Take It", a 1967 song by Ernie Smith, covered in 1975 by Johnny Nash as Tears on My Pillow (Johnny Nash song)
- I Can't Take It (Cheap Trick song), 1983
- I Can't Take It (Dillon Francis song), 2014
