= Go Off =

Go Off may refer to:

- "Go Off" (M.I.A. song), single by M.I.A. from the album AIM, 2016
- "Go Off" (Lil Uzi Vert, Quavo and Travis Scott song), song from the 2017 soundtrack The Fate of the Furious: The Album
- Go Off!, album by Cacophony, 1988
- "Go Off", song by Ab-Soul from the album Herbert, 2022
- "Go Off", single by Aasim, 2008
- "Go Off," song by Doja Cat from the album Scarlet, 2023
- "Go Off", song by DJ Kay Slay and Greg Street from the album The Champions: North Meets South, 2006
- "Go Off", song by Hustle Gang from the album We Want Smoke, 2017
- "Go Off", single by Jarren Benton from the album My Grandma's Basement, 2013
- "Go Off", single by KB from the album Weight & Glory, 2012
- "Go Off (Nuthin’ 2 It)", song by Dillon Francis from the 2019 mixtape Magic Is Real
