= Love in the Middle of a Firefight =

Single by Dillon Francis featuring Brendon Urie of Panic! at the Disco

from the album Money Sucks, Friends Rule
- Released: 16 October 2014
- Recorded: 2014
- Genre: EDM; synth-pop
- Length: 3:20
- Label: Mad Decent; Columbia
- Songwriter(s): Dillon Francis; Brendon Urie
- Producer(s): Dillon Francis; Mathieu Jomphe-Lepine; Joshua Coleman

Dillon Francis singles chronology
"Set Me Free" (2014)	"Love in the Middle of a Firefight" (2014)	"Not Butter" (2015)

Brendon Urie singles chronology
"Love in the Middle of a Firefight" (2014)	"Roses" (2018)

"Love in a Middle of a Firefight" is a song by American electronic music producer Dillon Francis, featuring vocals of American singer and Panic! at the Disco member Brendon Urie. The song was written by Dillon Francis and Brendon Urie, with production handled by Dillon Francis, Billboard and Ammo. The song is the sixth single of Francis’s debut album, Money Sucks, Friends Rule, and was released for digital download on 16 October 2014. The song was originally intended to be the final single, however the song Not Butter took the place, released on 22 June 2015.

== Background ==
Francis announced that he is working on the sixth single, in which will feature Panic! at the Disco main member Brendon Urie. The song was released by Columbia Records for digital download on 16 October 2014.

Francis also confirmed that he wanted work with Panic! at the Disco member Brendon Urie. Francis was happy to collaborate with the Panic! at the Disco singer and he gave a positive review to his own song. Francis later stated that he was happy to work with Brendon Urie, and that it was a dream come true, also stating that the song is one of his favorites tracks on his debut album.

In 2017, Francis later announced that he was working on Panic! at the Disco's upcoming album, and that he would be the producer of their sixth album.

== Chart performance ==
=== Weekly charts ===
Chart (2014)	Peak position
US Hot Dance/Electronic Songs (Billboard)	45

== Release history ==
Region	Date	Format	Label
United States	16 October 2014	Digital download	Mad Decent; Columbia
