= Coming Over (Dillon Francis and Kygo song) =

Single by Dillon Francis and Kygo featuring James Hersey

from the album This Mixtape Is Fire
- Released: February 12, 2016
- Recorded: 2015
- Length: 2:58
- Label: Mad Decent; Columbia; Ministry of Sound
- Songwriters: Dillon Francis; Kygo; James Hersey
- Producers: Dillon Francis; Kygo

Dillon Francis singles chronology
"All That" (2015)	"Coming Over" (2016)	"Need You" (2016)

Kygo singles chronology
"Stay" (2015)	"Coming Over" (2016)	"Raging" (2016)

Music video
- "Coming Over" on YouTube

"Coming Over" is a 2016 single by American electronic music producer Dillon Francis and Norwegian DJ and record producer Kygo, featuring vocals by Austrian singer James Hersey. The track is taken from Dillon Francis' 2015 EP set This Mixtape Is Fire. The single is the first number-one for all three artists involved on Billboard's Dance Club Songs chart, reaching the top spot in its June 11, 2016 issue. The song is actually a sampled recording using multiple elements of the original version of James Hersey's "Coming Over," which he recorded in 2014.

== Track listing ==
From iTunes

Digital download – single
No.	Title	Length
1.	"Coming Over"	2:58

Digital download – EP
No.	Title	Length
1.	"Coming Over" (Tiësto remix)	3:10
2.	"Coming Over" (Tommy Trash remix)	3:46
3.	"Coming Over" (Cazztek remix)	4:19
4.	"Coming Over" (CRNKN remix)	4:00

== Charts ==
=== Weekly charts ===
Chart (2015–2016)	Peak position
Sweden (Sverigetopplistan)	93
US Dance Club Songs (Billboard)	1
US Hot Dance/Electronic Songs (Billboard)	14
US Pop Airplay (Billboard)	40

=== Year-end charts ===
Chart (2015)	Position
US Hot Dance/Electronic Songs (Billboard)	59
Chart (2016)	Position
US Dance Club Songs (Billboard)	5
US Hot Dance/Electronic Songs (Billboard)	38

== Certifications ==
Region	Certification	Certified units/sales
New Zealand (RMNZ)	Gold	15,000^{‡}
United States (RIAA)	Gold	500,000^{‡}
^{‡} Sales+streaming figures based on certification alone.
