= Munchi =

Munchi may refer to:

- Tiv people (historical name)
- Munchi (DJ)
