= Party & Destroy =

EP by Party Favor
- Released: 12 August 2016
- Recorded: 2016
- Genre: Trap
- Length: 20:07
- Label: Mad Decent
- Producer: Party Favor

Party & Destroy is the debut EP by American DJ and producer, Party Favor. It was released through Mad Decent on 12 August 2016.

== Track listing ==
No.	Title	Length
1.	"Give It to Me Twice" (featuring Sean Kingston & Rich the Kid)	2:56
2.	"Back Again" (with Gent & Jawns)	3:01
3.	"Scrape" (featuring Gucci Mane)	4:15
4.	"In My Head" (featuring Georgia Ku)	3:30
5.	"Shut It Down" (with Dillon Francis)	3:22
6.	"Whole Lotta Money" (featuring Rich the Kid)	3:00
Total length:		20:07
