= When We Were Young (Dillon Francis and Sultan + Shepard song) =

Single by Dillon Francis and Sultan + Shepard featuring The Chain Gang of 1974

from the album Money Sucks, Friends Rule
- Released: 5 August 2014
- Recorded: 2014
- Genre: EDM; electro house
- Length: 3:20
- Label: Mad Decent; Columbia
- Songwriters: Dillon Francis; Kamtin Mohager
- Producers: Dillon Francis; Ned Shepard; Ossama Al-Sarraf

Dillon Francis singles chronology
"Get Low" (2014)	"When We Were Young" (2014)	"I Can't Take It" (2014)

Sultan & Shepard singles chronology
"Walls" (2012)	"When We Were Young" (2014)	"Make Things Right" (2015)

The Chain Gang of 1974 singles chronology
"Plum" (2014)	"When We Were Young" (2014)	"Slow" (2017)

Music video
- "When We Were Young" on YouTube

"When We Were Young" is a song by American electronic music producer Dillon Francis and Canadian electronic music duo Sultan + Shepard featuring guest vocals of The Chain Gang of 1974. The song was written by Dillon Francis and The Chain Gang of 1974, with production handled by Dillon Francis and Sultan + Shepard. It was released as a digital download on 5 August 2014 and is the second single from his debut studio album Money Sucks, Friends Rule. Francis released the music video on 21 October 2014 in YouTube.

== Background ==
After confirming his new album name and release date, Dillon Francis collaborates with Sultan + Shepard and The Chain Gang of 1974 to launch together his new song on 5 August 2014 named, "When We Were Young". Later, Francis announced an EP that features the official remixes of "When We Were Young".

On 21 October 2014, the music video for When We Were Young released on Dillon Francis' YouTube channel. The video features Dillon Francis playing a fictional three year old version of himself at a birthday party, with Kamtin Mohager playing a birthday clown.

The EP remix included 5 songs, and was released on 10 November 2014, and features remixes by Valentino Khan, Vicetone, Pierce Fulton, Juventa, Grandtheft and Zomboy.

== Track listing ==
Digital download
No.	Title	Length
1.	"When We Were Young"	4:09

Digital download
No.	Title	Length
1.	"When We Were Young"	4:09
2.	"When We Were Young (Vicetone Remix)"	4:53
3.	"When We Were Young (Pierce Fulton Remix)"	4:31
4.	"When We Were Young (Juventa Remix)"	4:31
5.	"When We Were Young (Grandtheft Remix)"	3:53
6.	"When We Were Young (Zomboy Remix)"	4:58

== Chart performance ==
=== Weekly charts ===
Chart (2014)	Peak position
US Hot Dance/Electronic Songs (Billboard)	25

== Release history ==
Region	Date	Format	Label
United States	5 August 2014	Digital download	Mad Decent; Columbia
