= Set Me Free (Dillon Francis and Martin Garrix song) =

Single by Dillon Francis and Martin Garrix

from the album Money Sucks, Friends Rule
- Released: 7 October 2014
- Recorded: 2013/2014
- Genre: Electro house
- Length: 4:07
- Label: Mad Decent; Columbia
- Songwriters: Dillon Francis; Martijn Garritsen
- Producers: Dillon Francis; Martijn Garritsen

Dillon Francis singles chronology
"We Make It Bounce" (2014)	"Set Me Free" (2014)	"Love in the Middle of a Firefight" (2014)

Martin Garrix singles chronology
"Turn Up the Speakers" (2014)	"Set Me Free" (2014)	"Virus (How About Now)" (2014)

Music video
- "Set Me Free" on YouTube

"Set Me Free" is the single by American electronic music producer Dillon Francis and Dutch DJ Martin Garrix. It was released as a digital download on 7 October 2014 as the fifth single from his debut studio album Money Sucks, Friends Rule. The single was produced by Dillon Francis and Martin Garrix. The official music video was released on 15 December 2015 by Dillon Francis in his YouTube channel.

== Background ==
Dillon Francis announced that he was working in the album's fifth single with DJ Martin Garrix called "Set Me Free", for his upcoming debut album "Money Sucks, Friends Rule" on September. The single was originally released as a promotional single, but when the radio launched it, the single was later credited as the album's fifth single. On October 7, 2014, Francis released the single available as digital download in all the platforms and digital stores, such as Spotify, Amazon, iTunes, Deezer, and Google Play.

Francis continues working with Garrix to realise the single official video, which was released one year later on 15 December 2015. The video was released by Francis on his own YouTube channel. Critics said that the video was trippy, strange and outrageous. The video of the single also uses flashbacks of the 1990s and the single only consists of the following lyrics, "Set Me Free". The video is only three minutes long, Francis also described that he had to provide funny faces and moves to obtain a trippy, the internet-inspired visuals for his live performances.

== Charts ==
Chart (2014)	Peak position
Belgium Dance (Ultratop Flanders)	49
Belgium (Ultratip Bubbling Under Flanders)	57
US Hot Dance/Electronic Songs (Billboard)	24

== Release history ==
Region	Date	Format	Label
United States	7 October 2014	Digital download	Mad Decent; Columbia
