= When We Were Young =

When We Were Young may refer to:

== Film ==
- When We Were Young (film), a 1989 television film directed by Daryl Duke
- When We Were Young (web series), a 2018 Chinese web series

== Music ==
=== Albums ===
- When We Were Young (album), a 2001 album by Dusted
- When We Were Young, 1997 album by Eddie Hardin
- When We Were Young, 2006 album by Akira the Don
- When We Were Young, 2020 album by Eric Chou
- When We Were Young: Live in London, 1972 album by Roxy Music

=== Songs ===
- "When We Were Young" (Pat Lynch song), 1971
- "When We Were Young" (Bucks Fizz song), 1983
- "When We Were Young" (Human Nature song), 2001
- "When We Were Young" (Sneaky Sound System song), 2008
- "When We Were Young" (Take That song), 2011
- "When We Were Young" (Dillon Francis and Sultan + Shepard song), 2014
- "When We Were Young" (Adele song), 2015
- "When We Were Young" (Passenger song), 2016
- "When We Were Young", a song on the 1984 album Close Company by Lou Rawls
- "When We Were Young", a song on the 1995 album Heartworm by Whipping Boy
- "When We Were Young", a song on the 2004 album Happy Love Sick by Shifty Shellshock
- "When We Were Young", 2017 by Jo Harman
- "When We Were Young", a song on the 2023 album One More Time... by Blink-182
- "When We Were Young (The Logical Song)", a 2023 single by David Guetta and Kim Petras

=== Festivals ===
- When We Were Young (festival), a music festival scheduled in October 2022

== See also ==
- When We Were Very Young, a 1924 book of poetry by A. A. Milne
- When You Were Young, a song by the Killers
