= Pull It =

Pull It may refer to:

- "Pull It", a 2009 song by Shystie
- "Pull It", a 2015 song by Dillon Francis and Bro Safari from This Mixtape Is Fire
- "Pull it", a command in Hasbro's Bop It game
