= Get Low (Dillon Francis and DJ Snake song) =

Single by Dillon Francis and DJ Snake

from the album Money Sucks, Friends Rule
- Released: February 11, 2014
- Genre: EDM trap
- Length: 3:32
- Label: Mad Decent; Columbia; Ministry of Sound (UK)
- Songwriters: Steve Guess; Dillon Francis; William Grigahcine; Martin Bresso
- Producers: Dillon Francis; DJ Snake; Tchami

Dillon Francis singles chronology
"Without You" (2013)	"Get Low" (2014)	"When We Were Young" (2014)

DJ Snake singles chronology
"Turn Down for What" (2013)	"Get Low" (2014)	"You Know You Like It" (2014)

Music video
- "Get Low" on YouTube

"Get Low" is a song by American electronic music producer Dillon Francis and French DJ and producer DJ Snake. The song was released as a digital download in February 2014 as the lead single from Francis' debut album, Money Sucks, Friends Rule. The official video was released on the official Dillon Francis YouTube channel on May 22, 2014. The song was remade by T-Series and was named Khallas for the movie Veerappan, directed by Ram Gopal Varma.

== Background ==
In 2013, after Francis confirmed that his debut album will be released the following year, Francis announced a new song in collaboration with DJ Snake. On February 11, Francis had already launched his new song titled "Get Low", in which he confirmed that the song is the lead single of his debut album. On April 22, he confirmed that the title of his debut album is Money Sucks, Friends Rule. On 22 May, Francis released the official video of the song.

On 2 June 2014, Francis released an EP which features 5 remixes of the song: "The Rebirth in Paris" version and remixes by W&W, TrollPhace, Aazar and Neo Fresco. On 7 April 2015, Francis released the remix of the song, featuring hip-hop duo Rae Sremmurd.

== Lyrics ==
The entire song consists of the following lyrics, "Get low when the whistle go", while interspersed with some exclamations like "Barbès, Yalla Habibi" (an Arabic phrase translating to "Let's go, my love"), tongue rolling and feminine yelling. The song is an available track on the rhythm game Just Dance 2015 and is featured in the film Furious 7 and its affiliated video game, Forza Horizon 2 Presents Fast & Furious, which is a standalone expansion of the open-world racing video game Forza Horizon 2. The official remix features additional vocals by Rae Sremmurd and is featured as the theme song of the Robert Duvall film Get Low.

== Composition ==
The song features Chigwell style folk music of North Tasmanian suburb origin, including a sample mix of Algerian folk band Orchestre National de Barbès.

== Track listing ==
Digital download
No.	Title	Length
1.	"Get Low"	3:33

Digital download
No.	Title	Length
1.	"Get Low"	3:33
2.	"Get Low" (Edit)	2:50

Digital download – Edit
No.	Title	Length
1.	"Get Low" (Edit)	2:50

Digital download – Remixes EP
No.	Title	Length
1.	"Get Low" (Rebirth in Paris)	3:05
2.	"Get Low" (W&W Remix)	3:33
3.	"Get Low" (TrollPhace Remix)	3:34
4.	"Get Low" (Aazar Remix)	4:22
5.	"Get Low" (Neo Fresco Remix)	4:42

Digital download – Remix (Included In The “Money Sucks, Friends Rule” Album)
No.	Title	Length
1.	"Get Low" (Remix) (featuring Rae Sremmurd)	3:34

== Charts ==
=== Weekly charts ===
Chart (2014–2015)	Peak position
Australia (ARIA)	44
Australia Hitseekers (ARIA)	1
Austria (Ö3 Austria Top 40)	55
Belgium (Ultratip Bubbling Under Flanders)	8
Belgium Dance (Ultratop Flanders)	31
Canada Hot 100 (Billboard)	48
France (SNEP)	93
Germany (GfK)	79
Greece Digital Songs (Billboard)	2
Scotland Singles (OCC)	64
Sweden Heatseeker (Sverigetopplistan)	2
UK Singles (OCC)	88
UK Dance (OCC)	23
UK Indie (OCC)	4
US Billboard Hot 100	61
US Hot Dance/Electronic Songs (Billboard)	5
US Dance Club Songs (Billboard)	50
US Rhythmic Airplay (Billboard)	30

=== Year-end charts ===
Chart (2014)	Position
US Hot Dance/Electronic Songs (Billboard)	52
Chart (2015)	Position
US Hot Dance/Electronic Songs (Billboard)	28

== Certifications ==
Region	Certification	Certified units/sales
Australia (ARIA)	Gold	35,000^{^}
Canada (Music Canada)	Platinum	80,000^{*}
New Zealand (RMNZ)	Gold	7,500^{*}
United States (RIAA)	Platinum	1,000,000^{‡}
^{*} Sales figures based on certification alone.^{^} Shipments figures based on certification alone.^{‡} Sales+streaming figures based on certification alone.

== Release history ==
Release dates and formats for "Get Low"
Region	Date	Format	Label(s)	Ref.
United States	July 8, 2014	Mainstream airplay	Columbia	
