= Filous =

Austrian music producer and DJ

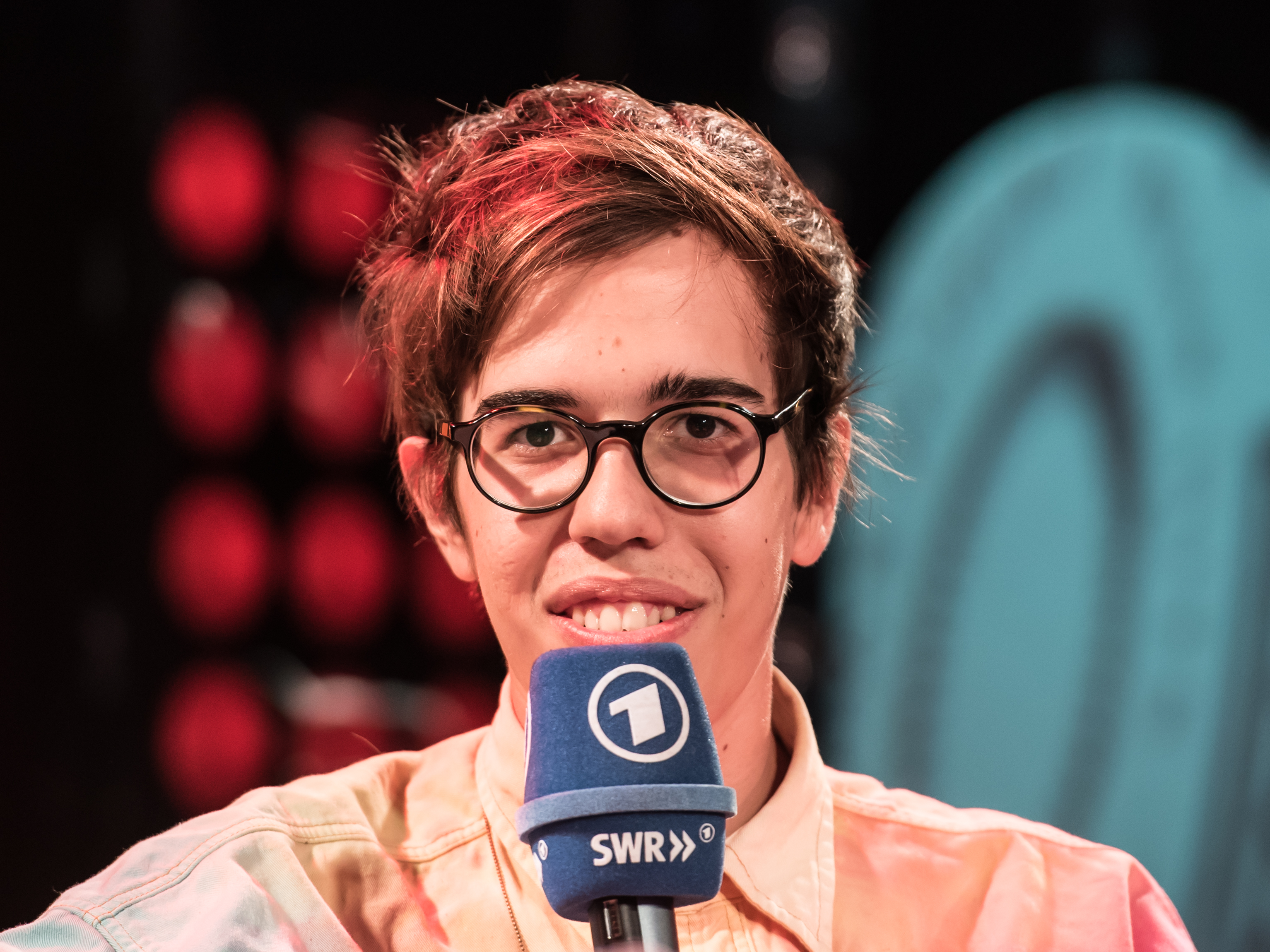
- Filous in 2016

Background information
- Born: Matthias Oldofredi; 4 March 1997 (age 29); Austria
- Genres: House
- Occupations: Producer, DJ
- Years active: 2013–present

Matthias Oldofredi (born 4 March 1997), known by his previous stage name Filous (stylised in all lowercase) and current stage name Mietze Conte, is an Austrian music producer, disc jockey and remixer.

== Career ==
Oldofredi first published his remixes on YouTube and SoundCloud and thus became popular. In 2015, he published the single "How Hard I Try" with James Hersey, which reached the Austrian, German, and Dutch charts as well as the Belgian Ultratip charts. Filous was nominated for the Austrian Amadeus Awards 2016 in the categories "Artist of the Year", "Song of the Year" and "Electronic/Dance". On 11 January 2017, he was awarded with the European Border Breakers Award (EBBA). In 2020, Filous collaborated with The Kooks on their single "Hey Love".

Oldofredi started a new electronic/hyperpop project under the name Mietze Conte, with breakout single "bunnybunnybunny" released in 2022. Subsequent albums "Mietzee" (2024), "ee oo" (2024), "Hobby's" (2024) with Otto Benson, and "wufwufwuf" (2026) have amassed many listeners on Spotify, SoundCloud, and BandCamp.

== Discography ==
=== Albums ===
- A Producer From Vienna (2022)

=== EPs ===
- Dawn (2015)
- For Love (2017)

=== Singles ===
Year	Title	Peak chart positions			Album
Year	Title	AUT	BEL (Flanders)	BEL (Wallonia)	Album
2015	"How Hard I Try" (featuring James Hersey)	33	7	24	DAWN
2015	"Shaded In" (featuring Jordan Leser)	—	—	—	DAWN
2016	"Feel Good Inc." (featuring Lissa)	—	—	—	Non-album singles
2016	"Emelie" (with Mount featuring Buster Moe)	—	—	—	Non-album singles
2016	"Let It Snow"	—	—	—	Non-album singles
2017	"Goodbye" (featuring Mat Kearney)	—	—	—	For Love
2017	"Knots" (featuring Klei)	—	—	—	For Love
2018	"Bicycle" (featuring Klei)	—	—	—	Non-album singles
2020	"Hey Love" (with The Kooks)	533	-	-	Non-album singles
2022	"Sabada" (with Daði Freyr)	—	—	—	Non-album singles
2023	"Great Big Warm House" (with Golden Vessel)	52	—	—	Non-album singles
2023	"Colours" (with Golden Vessel)	—	—	—	
"—" denotes a single that did not chart or was not released.
