= Party Favor (DJ) =

American DJ & EDM producer

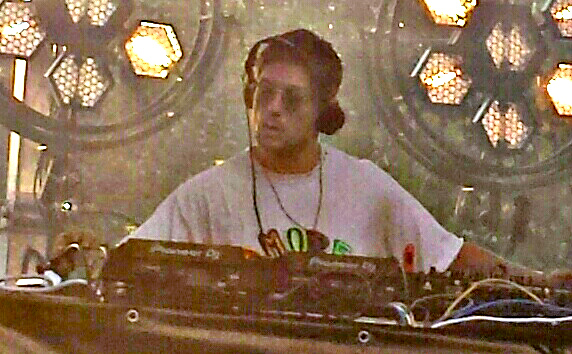
- Party Favor in 2018

Background information
- Born: Dylan Ragland; Manhattan, United States
- Genres: Trap; electro house
- Occupations: DJ; musician
- Instrument: Digital audio workstation
- Label: Mad Decent; Area 25
- Member of: Sidepiece

Dylan Ragland, better known by his stage name Party Favor, is an American DJ and EDM producer.

Ragland is a member of the electronic music duo "Sidepiece" with Nitti Gritti.

== Early life ==
Ragland was born in Manhattan and grew up in Park City, Utah. He attended Chapman University. After graduating, he had worked for NBC making sizzle reels despite aspiring to become an actor. He quit the job shortly after to pursue a career in DJing. He began DJing with his friend, Alex, he met at Chapman before they separated. Later, he had used "Party Favor" as an alias to his musical project.

== Career ==
On April 22, 2016, he released "Bust Em" as a single along with a music video. On August 12, 2016, he released his debut extended play via Mad Decent titled "Party & Destroy" featuring collaborations with Sean Kingston, Rich The Kid, Gucci Mane, Dillon Francis and Gent & Jawns. In August 2016, Ragland collaborated with Dillon Francis to release "Shut It Down" as a single. A music video for the song was released.

In 2019, the 2018 single "Circle Up" (featuring singer Bipolar Sunshine) saw significant success due to its appearance in the Coca-Cola Energy launch commercial and on the eFootball Pro Evolution Soccer 2020 soundtrack.

== Discography ==
=== Albums ===
| Title | Release date | Label | Format |
|---|---|---|---|
| Layers | April 26, 2019 | Area 25 | Digital download |
| The Isolation Album | July 17, 2020 | Area 25 | Digital download |
| RESET | June 17, 2022 | Ultra Records, LLC | Digital download |

=== Singles and EPs ===
| Title | Release date | Label | Format(s) | Ref(s) |
|---|---|---|---|---|
| "Bap U" | October 7, 2014 | Mad Decent | Digital download | |
| "Booty Loose" | July 17, 2015 | Mad Decent | Digital download | |
| "Wiggle Wop" (featuring Keno) | May 26, 2016 | Mad Decent | Digital download | |
| Party & Destroy EP | August 12, 2016 | Mad Decent | Digital download, CD | |
| "Wawa" | March 17, 2017 | Mad Decent | Digital download | |
| "Caskets" (with Njomza featuring FKi 1st) | June 9, 2017 | Mad Decent | Digital download | |
| "Bury" (featuring Richie Loop) | September 29, 2017 | Area 25 | Digital download | |
| "MDR" (with Baauer) | March 16, 2018 | Area 25 | Digital download | |
| "Blame" (featuring Naïka) | November 16, 2018 | Mad Decent | Digital download | |
| "Fresh Laundry" | May 1, 2020 | Area 25 | Digital download | |
| "Whoa" (with Bijou) | June 19, 2020 | Do Not Duplicate Recordings | Digital download | |
| "Oh Nah Yeah" (with Chaii) | May 20, 2021 | Black Lotus Records | Digital download | |
| "Save Me" | August 6, 2021 | Ultra Records | Digital download | |
| "Losing My Mind" (with Elohim) | September 17, 2021 | Ultra Records | Digital download | |
| "Whenever You're Around" | November 5, 2021 | Ultra Records | Digital download | |
| "Anxious" (with Masn) | December 3, 2021 | Ultra Records | Digital download | |
| "Superhuman" (with K.Flay) | January 28, 2022 | Ultra Records | Digital download | |
| "I See You" (with Marc E. Bassy) | March 4, 2022 | Ultra Records | Digital download | |

=== Charted singles ===
| Year | Chart | Title | Album | Peak chart positions | Ref |
|---|---|---|---|---|---|
| 2016 | US Airplay | "In My Head" (featuring Georgia Ku) | Party & Destroy | 7 | |
