= James Hersey =

Austrian-American pop singer and songwriter

- Born: 15 July 1988 (age 37); Vienna, Austria
- Occupation: Musician

James Hersey (born July 15, 1988) is an Austrian-American pop singer and songwriter from Vienna.

== Life ==
Hersey learned to play percussion and cello in his youth before switching to guitar. He played in punk rock bands and sang in a high school choir before switching to popular music, releasing his debut EP in 2010. He signed with Glassnote Records in 2012. He scored two hits in Austria and Germany - "How Hard I Try", with Filous, reached #96 in Germany and #33 in Austria in 2015, and "Miss You" reached #90 in Germany and #61 in Austria in 2016. He also was featured on the track "Coming Over" by Dillon Francis and Kygo, which reached #40 in the US Billboard Mainstream Top 40 chart and #1 on the Dance/Club Play chart. "Miss You" and "Coming Over" were both described by Billboard as "generating millions of plays" on the streaming service Spotify.

== Discography ==
=== Albums ===
- 2015: Clarity
- 2021: Fiction
- 2023: Let It Shine

=== EPs ===
- 2011: James Hersey
- 2017: Pages
- 2019: Innerverse

=== Mixtapes ===
- 2012: Twelve
- 2014: Girls

=== Singles ===
- 2011: Stand Up for You
- 2011: It Ain’t Over
- 2012: All I Want
- 2012: Forever Yours
- 2013: High Five
- 2014: Juliet
- 2014: Don’t Say Maybe
- 2015: What I’ve Done
- 2015: Coming Over (filous Remix)
- 2015: How Hard I Try (mit filous)
- 2016: Miss You
- 2018: Real For You
- 2018: Let Go (feat. filous)
- 2019: My People (mit Jeremy Loops)
- 2019: Hands on Me (mit ELI)
- 2020: Forget (About Everyone Else)

=== Guest Contributions ===
- 2016: Coming Over (Dillon Francis & Kygo feat. James Hersey)
- 2017: Like I Do (Camo & Krooked feat. James Hersey)

== Music Awards ==
Gold Records

- Italy
  - 2017: for the Single Miss You
- Canada
  - 2017: for the Single Miss You
- United States
  - 2018: for the Single Coming Over
