= Wut Wut =

Studio album by Dillon Francis
- Released: September 28, 2018
- Recorded: 2017–2018
- Length: 33:30
- Label: IDGAFOS
- Producer: Dillon Francis; James Rushent; Michael Angelakos; René Pérez

Dillon Francis chronology
This Mixtape Is Fire (2015)	Wut Wut (2018)	Magic Is Real (2019)

Singles from Wut Wut
- 1. "Ven" Released: January 24, 2018; 2. "We the Funk" Released: February 21, 2018; 3. "Sexo" Released: April 13, 2018; 4. "BaBaBa" Released: May 9, 2018; 5. "Look at That Butt" Released: June 20, 2018; 6. "Never Let You Go" Released: July 9, 2018; 7. "White Boi" Released: September 10, 2018; 8. "No Pare" Released: September 29, 2018; 9. "Cuando" Released: September 30, 2018

Wut Wut is the second studio album by American DJ and electronic music producer Dillon Francis, released on September 28, 2018 through IDGAFOS. The album contains Spanish-language songs and collaborations with Latin singers. It was made available to pre-order and pre-save on July 11, 2018, via Francis official website. Latin and reggaeton artists featured include Residente, De La Ghetto, Jarina De Marco, Arcángel, Químico Ultra Mega and Young Ash.

== Background ==
On April 5, 2017, Francis launched his new label IDGAFOS with the release of the song "Say Less" featuring G-Eazy. On December 20, 2017, Francis revealed that he was working on two new albums set to be released in 2018; he first announced a Spanish-language album but without confirming a release date.

On July 11, 2018, Francis confirmed that the album would be released on September 28, 2018. He also revealed the album cover and the title on his Twitter.

== Singles ==
"Ven" was released as the album's lead single on January 24, 2018, featuring reggaeton singers Arcángel and Quimico Ultra Mega. The music video was released in YouTube on March 22.

"We the Funk" featuring reggaeton singer Fuego was released as the album's second single on February 21, 2018. The song peaked at number 26 on the US Billboard Dance/Electronic Songs chart. The music video was released on the same day that the song was released.

"Sexo" was released on April 13, 2018, as the third single from the album, in collaboration with Puerto Rican rapper Residente and featuring iLe.

"BaBaBa" featuring female rapper Young Ash was released on May 9, 2018, as the album's fourth single. The song debuted at number 47 on the Billboard Dance/Electronic Songs chart.

"Look at That Butt" featuring Jarina De Marco was released on June 20, 2018, as the album's fifth single.

Francis released the sixth single "Never Let You Go" featuring De La Ghetto on July 9, 2018, the same day he confirmed the album's release date.

On September 9, 2018, Francis announced on his Twitter that he would release a new single. A day later, Francis released the seventh single, "White Boi". He also released the music video on the same day.

A day after the album's release Francis released the album's eighth single "No Pare" featuring Yashua, and the next day he released "Cuando" featuring Happy Colors.

== Track listing ==
Wut Wut track listing
No.	Title	Writer(s)	Producer(s)	Length
1.	"White Boi" (featuring Lao Ra)	Ale Alberti; Chris Wallace; James Rushent; Laura Carvajalino Avila; Dillon Francis	James Rushent; Chris Wallace; Francis	3:05
2.	"Esta Noche" (featuring Ximena Sariñana)	Eben D'Amico; Michael Angelakos; Jim-E Stack; Francis	Michael Angelakos; Ximena Sariñana; Francis; James Stack	3:09
3.	"No Pare" (featuring Yashua)	Francis; Matt Hunter; Jesse Baez; Rushent; Yashua Camacho; Stack	Rushent; Stack; Francis	3:10
4.	"Sexo" (with Residente featuring iLe)	René Pérez	Francis; James Rushent; René Pérez	3:29
5.	"Never Let You Go" (featuring De La Ghetto)	Rushent; Michael Angelakos; Francis; Rafael Castillo; Pablo Christian Fuentes	Francis; Rushent; Angelakos	3:11
6.	"We the Funk" (featuring Fuego)	Rushent; Miguel Duran; Francis	Francis; Rushent; P. Diaz	3:07
7.	"Look at That Butt" (featuring Jarina De Marco)	Rushent; Jarina De Marco; Francis	Francis; Rushent	2:32
8.	"Cuando" (featuring Happy Colors)		Francis; P. Diaz	2:57
9.	"Ven" (featuring Arcángel and Quimico Ultra Mega)	Rushent; Agustin Santos; Francis; Jesus Alberto Jimenez	Francis; Rushent	3:06
10.	"BaBaBa" (featuring Young Ash)	Rushent; Ashley Franchesca Bautista; Francis	Francis; Rushent	2:56
11.	"Get It Get It"		Rushent; Francis	2:48
Total length:				33:30

== Charts ==
Chart performance for Wut Wut
Chart (2018)	Peak position
US Top Latin Albums (Billboard)	22
