= Munchi (DJ) =

Dutch producer and DJ (born 1989)

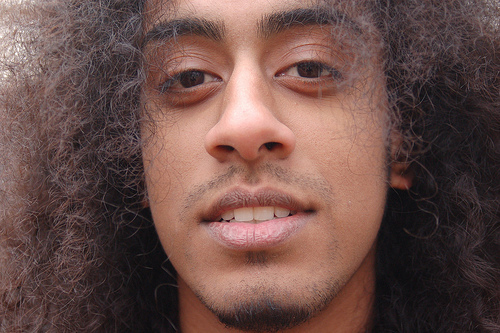
- Munchi in 2011

Background information
- Born: Rajiv Münch
- Origin: Rotterdam, Netherlands
- Genres: Moombahton, electronic, Baltimore club, baile funk, dubstep, reggaeton, juke, trap
- Occupations: Record producer, DJ, remixer
- Instrument: Acid Pro 5.0
- Years active: 2009–present
- Labels: T&A Records, Mad Decent, Selegna Records

Rajiv Münch (born 29 July 1989), better known by his stage name Munchi, is a Dutch producer and DJ of Dominican descent, born and raised in Rotterdam, Netherlands. He is credited to have made "the first truly original work" for moombahton, taking "the sound to the next level" and being the originator of moombahcore. Even though Munchi is credited mainly for moombahton, it was his versatility and unique production style that brought him into public attention. Notably producing a wide selection of genres and incorporating these elements in his music. This is best represented in the Murda Sound debut on T&A Records, consisting of a wide variety of genres doing Munchi's versatility justice. In December 2010 Munchi was featured with 3 tracks on M.I.A.'s Vicki Leekx mixtape, and in July 2012 on Azealia Banks' Fantasea mixtape, with the track "Esta Noche."

== Background ==
Munchi started making music in 2004 when his brother bought him Acid Pro. He met future collaborator David Heartbreak via MySpace in 2009. After Munchi mentioned Dave Nada's Moombahton EP, Heartbreak wanted to learn more about the genre and invited him to Charlotte. While touring the United States in March 2011, Munchi suffered a seizure caused by an intracerebral hemorrhage. After learning of Münch's condition, fellow producers DJ Ayres, Tittsworth and Dave Nada organised a fundraiser "to pay for surgery, medication and flight home for the non-American insured producer". He spent 9 hours in coma and 11 days in the hospital, but when noticing the overwhelming support it inspired him to recover faster during 2011.

== Discography ==
=== Free EPs ===
2009:

- Dubstep Promo - [SEL-PR001]
- Baltimore Club Promo - [SEL-PR002]

2010:

- Baile Funk Promo - [SEL-PR003]
- B-more 2.0/2.1 + B-more Dub VIP's - [SEL-PR004]
- Moombahton Promo - [SEL-PR005]
- Munbreakton EP (with David Heartbreak) - [SEL-PR006]
- Cumbia XXX - [SEL-PR007]
- Kuduro Promo - [SEL-PR008]
- Fuck H&M (with David Heartbreak) - [SEL-PR009]

2011:

- H/M (with David Heartbreak) - [SEL-PR010]
- Rotterdam Juke EP - [SEL-PR011]

2012:

- 3 Ball Dub Ep - [SEL-PR012]
- Rotterdam Trap EP - [SEL-PR013]

2013:

- Vol. I: Skulltrap - [SEL-VL001]
- Moombahton Is Dead (V/A) - [SELPR001]

2014:

- Boom Bap Back (with Jon Kwest) - [SELPR002]
- Vol. II: Rasterinha (Contos Do Caderninho Verde) - [SELPR003]
- Vol. III: Perreo 101 - [SELPR004]

=== EPs ===
2010:

- Murda Sound EP - [T&A019]

2012:

- Moombahtonista EP - [MAD136]

2016:

- Naffie Back/Pa Lo Under EP - [SEL003]

=== Compilations ===
2010:

- Summer of Moombahton - [Self Released]

2011:

- Verano del Moombahton - [Self Released]

=== Mixtapes ===
2010:

- M.I.A. - Vicki Leekx

=== Singles ===
2008:

- Munchi - Nex Aan Te Doen Prt. 1

2010:

- Munchi - Break Your Fucking Face
- David Banner ft Lil' Flip - Like A Pimp (Munchi Has Bad Table Manners Moombahton Edit)
- Juvenile - Back That Ass Up (Munchi Reggeton Edit)
- Datsik - Firepower (Munchi Moombahcore Rmx)
- TC - Where's My Money (Caspa Rmx - Munchi's Kinda Aggressive Right Now Moombahcore Rmx)

2011:

- Soulja Boy - Pretty Boy Swag (Diplo & Munchi's 'Dude, I Can Make This In 5 Min With Acid Pro' Edit)
- Munchi ft M.I.A. - Murda Sound VIP
- Munchi ft Chito Rock - Bebe De To
- Munchi - Despair - Moombahsoul Vol. I
- Munchi - Gracias - Moombahton Massive II
- Munchi - Jimi Knows - Verano Del Moombahton
- Munchi - Virtud - Moombahsoul Vol. II
- Nadastrom & Munchi ft Jen Lasher - Say My Name - El Baile Diabluma

2012:

- Munchi ft Lakey - Not Usually
- Munchi - Fuck This
- Munchi - Te Gusta Mi Mambo Mami - Moombah Fiesta Vol. II

2013:

- Bro Safari x Munchi - Sin Compromiso (Munchi's Fuck Bitch Promoters VIP)

2014:

- Munchi ft Isa GT - Isa Te Dijo - Alegria/Isa Te Dijo

2017:

- Munchi - Guess Who's Back

=== Remixes ===
2010:

- Steve Starks - Git Em (Munchi Kuduro Rmx)
- Bassanovva - Chickenlover (Munchi Likes Em Fried Moombahton Rmx)
- Dogz & Bumps ft MC Zulu - Carnival Madness (Munchi's Only Beers & Rubbers Rmx)

2011:

- Nguzunguzu - Unfold (Munchi Likes Excessive Amounts Of Bass Mambo Juke Rmx)
- Dillon Francis & Dave Nada - Brazzers Theme (Munchi's Fuck That It's Bangbros Rmx)
- Autodidakt ft Spoek Mathambo - Fake Fred Perry (Munchi Is Muito Random Rmx)
- Buraka Som Sistema - Hangover (Munchi Airhorn Alert Rmx)
- Professor Angel Dust - Go (Munchi Thought Criminal Rmx)
- Bert On Beats - Bone Dat (Munchi's 'Nope This Aint Moombahton Dude' Trap Bubbling Rmx)

2012:

- Noisia - Tommy's Theme (Munchi's Fear Is Weakness Rmx)
- Skrillex – Ruffneck (FULL Flex) (Munchi Anonymous Revolution Rmx)
