= Tittsworth =

American DJ

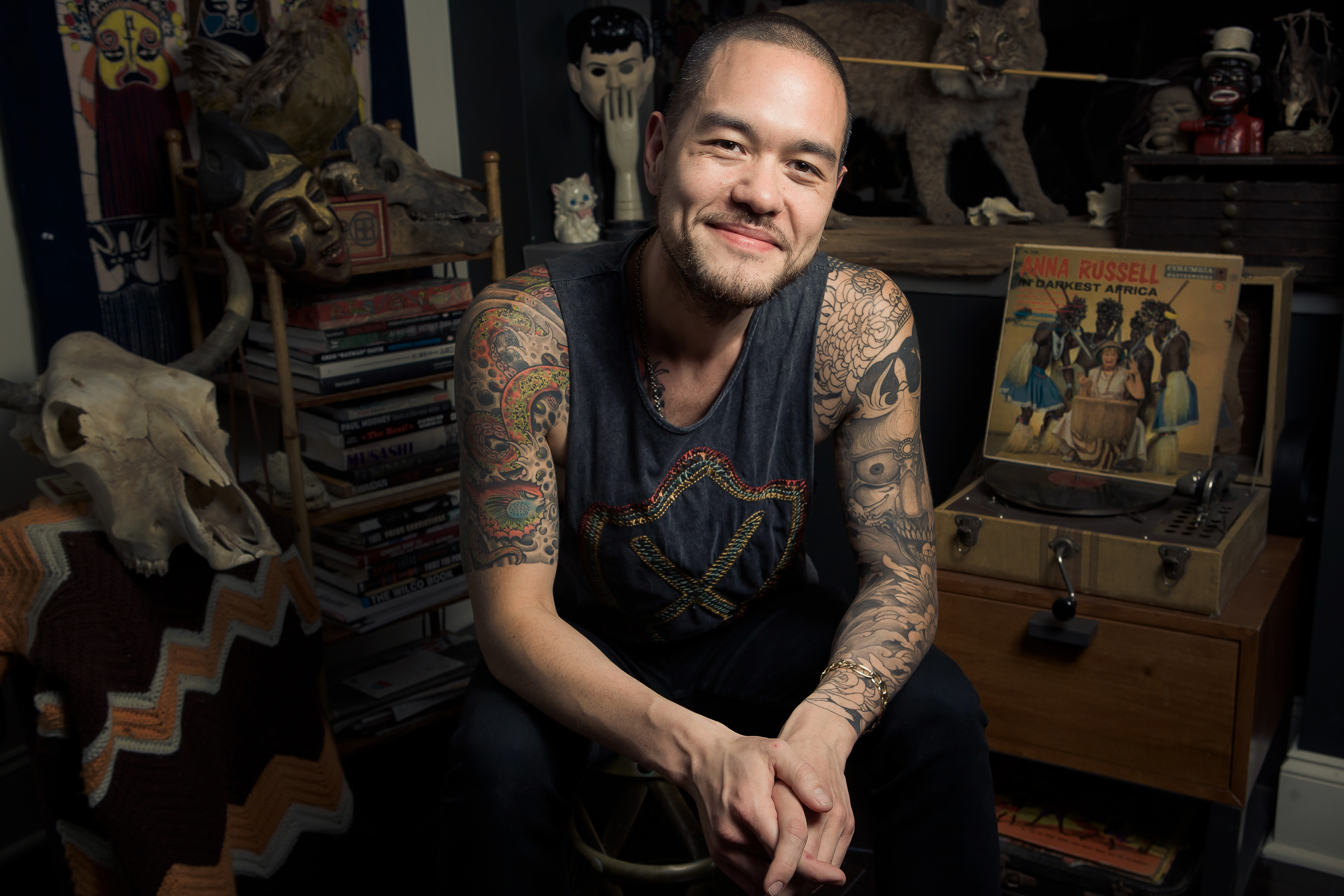
- Jesse Tittsworth smiling during a photo shoot

Background information
- Born: Jesse Tittsworth; February 26, 1979 (age 47); Philippines
- Genres: House, Baltimore club, moombahton, techno
- Occupations: DJ, producer, club owner, label owner
- Years active: 1992–present
- Labels: T&A Records, Hermanito Label
- Website: instagram.com/tittsworth

Jesse Tittsworth (born February 26, 1979), better known under his stage name Tittsworth, is an American DJ, producer, nightclub owner, and record label owner. He has worked on projects with Q-Tip, Theophilus London, Pitbull, Kid Sister and Alvin Risk. He co-founded T&A Records, Hermanito Label, and U Street Music Hall.

== Career ==
Tittsworth established his own record label, T&A Records, in 2006 with his partner, DJ Ayres.

Tittsworth has released over a dozen vinyl records, including Ammo's last release (A-Trak's battle imprint) and a variety of dance records since 2005.

Tittsworth's debut album is called 12 Steps. The LP featured Pitbull, Nina Sky, Kid Sister and The Federation. The Pitbull collaboration predated the EDM influx and gained the eye of the Ministry of Sound. Follow up songs included the moombahton track Pendejas, with Alvin Risk. He also collaborated with Alvin Risk and Maluca on La Campana, which appeared in FIFA 12.

In 2010, Tittsworth helped open, as co‐owner, U Street Music Hall. U Street Music Hall was named as a top ten venue in the US by Rolling Stone as of 2013. Tittsworth would be a part of the club's operations, bookings and artist liaison for the first two years, and would also DJ dozens of nights in its first five years.

In 2014, Tittsworth released a single, "Que Fresca", with reggaeton veteran DJ Blass. His next single "After The Dance" featured Q-Tip and Theophilus London. He has appeared on festivals, from ADE to raves like Hard Day of the Dead.

== Discography ==
=== Albums ===
- Twelve Steps (2008)

=== EPs and singles ===
- The Bonus (2006)
- White Label Exclusives (2007)
- The After-party (2007)
- Broke Ass Nigga (2008)
- WTF feat. Kid Sister & Pase Rock (2008)
- Drunk As Fuck feat. The Federation (2009)
- Here He Comes feat. Nina Sky & Pitbull (2009)
- Remixes (2010)
- Molly's Party feat. Ninjasonik (2010)
- Two Strokes Raw (with Alvin Risk) (2011)
- Juicy Jorts feat. Rez & Des McMahon (2012)
- Club 219 (2013)
- Give It To Dem feat. Shelco Garcia & TeenWolf (2013)
- TNT feat. Valentino Khan (2014)
- After The Dance feat. Q-Tip, Theophilus London, & Alison Carney (2014)

=== Remixes ===
- Scanners - "Salvation (Tittsworth Remix)" (2009)
- AC Slater - "BanGer (Tittsworth Remix)" (2009)
- Rob Threezy - "Let's Go Ravers (Tittsworth Remix)" (2010)
- Clicks & Whistles - "Neva Get Caught (Tittsworth Remix)" (2011)
- Nadastrom - "Diabluma Theme (Tittsworth Remix)" (2012)
- Breach - "Jack (Tittsworth & Alex Eljaiek Remix)" (2013)
- Scottie B & King Tut - "African Chant (Tittsworth Remix)" (2013)
