= This Mixtape Is Fire =

EP by Dillon Francis
- Released: August 14, 2015
- Genre: Moombahton; electro house
- Length: 22:53
- Producer: Dillon Francis; Bro Safari; Calvin Harris; Kygo; Party Favor; Skrillex

Dillon Francis chronology
Money Sucks, Friends Rule (2014)	This Mixtape Is Fire (2015)	Wut Wut (2018)

This Mixtape Is Fire (stylized as This Mixtape is Fire.) is the fourth EP by American DJ and record producer Dillon Francis. It was released on August 14, 2015.

== Critical reception ==
Professional ratings
Review scores
Source	Rating
AllMusic	3.5/5 stars
Newsday	B+

The EP received overall positive reviews from critics. David Jeffries, from AllMusic, wrote: "With this 2015 EP, Dillon Francis puts a leash on his prankster persona and focuses on his producer side with fantastic and chilled results". Steve Knopper, from Newsday, stated that "[the] stopgap EP by veteran DJ is star-studded, explosive, sometimes funny".

== Track listing ==
This Mixtape Is Fire
No.	Title	Writer(s)	Producer(s)	Length
1.	"Bruk Bruk (I Need Your Lovin')"	Dillon Hart Francis	Dillon Francis	3:12
2.	"What's Your Name" (with Calvin Harris)	Francis	Francis; Harris	3:47
3.	"Bun Up the Dance" (with Skrillex)	Francis; Sonny Moore	Francis; Skrillex	3:37
4.	"Pull It" (with Bro Safari)	Francis; Nicholas Weiller	Francis; Bro Safari	3:05
5.	"Coming Over" (with Kygo featuring James Hersey)	Francis; Kyrre Gorvell-Dahll	Francis; Kygo	2:58
6.	"Lies" (featuring Chromeo)	Francis; David Macklovitch	Francis	2:16
7.	"I Can't Take It" (Party Favor Remix)	Francis	Francis	4:01
Total length:				22:53

== Charts ==
Chart (2015–16)	Peak position
Australian Albums (ARIA)	25
Canadian Albums (Billboard)	11
New Zealand Albums (RMNZ)	38
US Billboard 200	39
US Top Dance Albums (Billboard)	1
