= Moombahton =

Genre of electronic dance music

- Stylistic origins: House; reggaeton; electro house; dancehall; dutch house; reggae fusion
- Cultural origins: 2009, Washington, D.C., United States
- Typical instruments: Dembow (rhythm); sampler; synthesizer; drum machine

Subgenres
- Moombahcore; Moombahsoul

Fusion genres
- Reggaestep; moombahtrap

Other topics
- Latin house; tropical house; dubstep; glitch hop

Moombahton (/ˈmuːmbətɒn/, MOOM-bə-ton) is an electronic dance music genre, derived from house music and reggaeton, that was created by American DJ and producer Dave Nada in Washington, D.C., in 2009. Nada coined the name as a portmanteau of "Moombah" (a track by Surinamese house DJ Chuckie and Dutch producer/DJ Silvio Ecomo) and reggaeton (itself a neologism combining reggae with the Spanish suffix -ton, signifying big).

== Characteristics ==
Identifying characteristics of moombahton include a thick and spread-out bass line, dramatic builds, and a two-step pulse with quick drum fills. Occasionally moombahton includes rave music synthesizers and a cappella rap samples. Musically, moombahton mixes the rhythmic origins of Dutch house or house music, the slow tempo of reggaeton, usually between 100-110bpm, accompanied by bouncy percussions from reggaeton.

== History ==
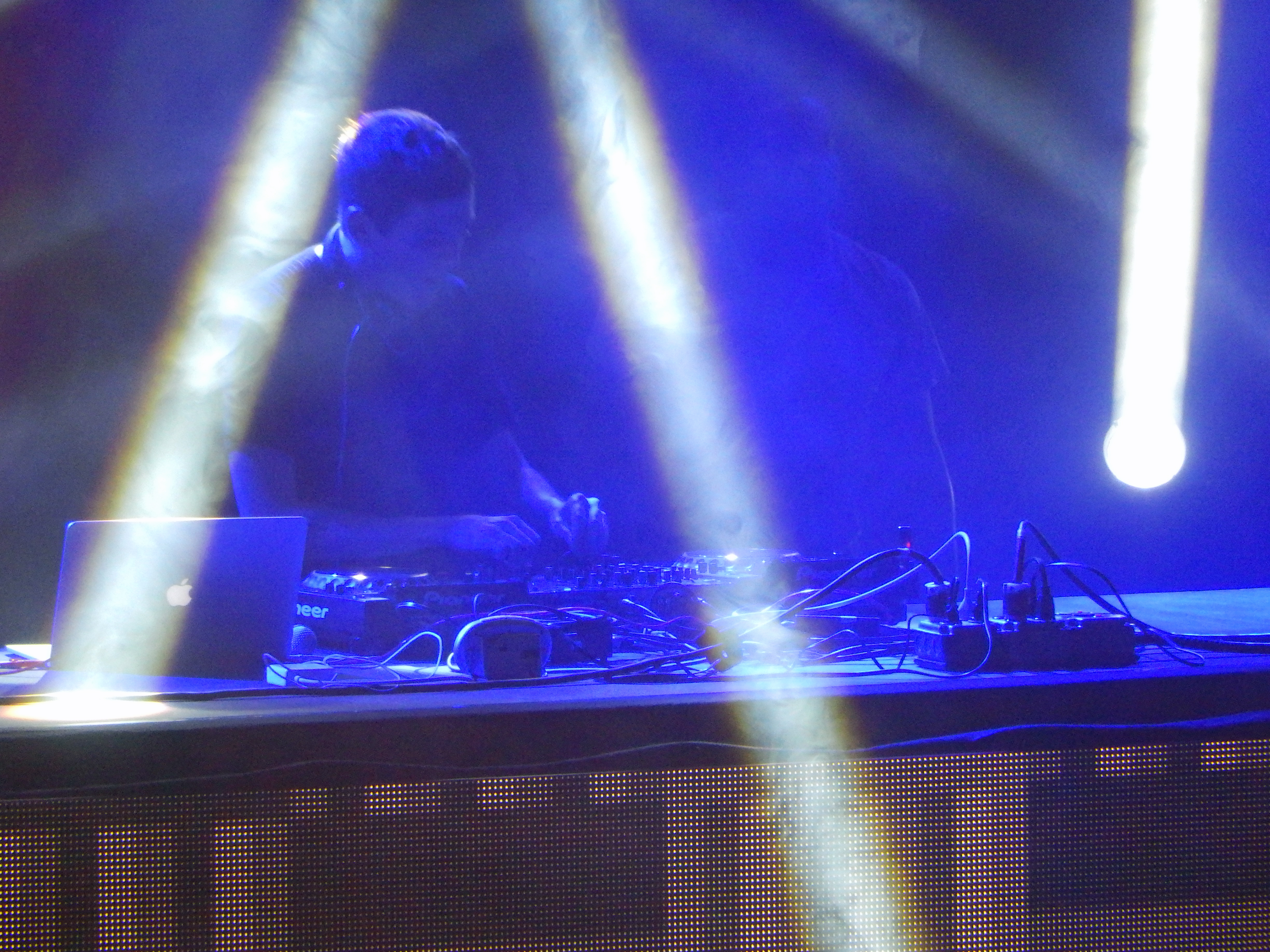
Dillon Francis has been a notable artist of moombahton.

Moombahton was created by Dave Nada in late 2009 while DJing his cousin's high school cut party in Washington, D.C. He blended the house and club music which he had planned to play with the reggaeton and bachata the guests were previously listening to by slowing down Afrojack's remix of Silvio Ecomo and Chuckie's song "Moombah!" from 128 bpm to 108 bpm, to create the basis of the genre.

... I tried to slow down my house songs, I put the Afrojack remix of "Moombah" by Silvio Ecomo and DJ Chuckie at 108 bpm, and the people went crazy. I did the same with Sidney Samson's "Riverside", and it was a delirium. I understood that I would have to record these editions as soon as possible

— Dave Nada

Between late 2009 and early 2010, Nada worked on a five track extended play of moombahton that was released in March 2010, with the support of the DJ Ayres and the DJ Tittsworth at T&A Records.

== Subgenres ==
=== Moombahcore ===
Moombahcore is a derivation of moombahton with dubstep influences, also incorporating elements of newstyle hardcore, breakcore, and techstep. Moombahcore fused dubstep drums and moombahton tempo (100-115 BPM), incorporating elements such as wobble bass, FM synths, distorted basslines, and complex percussion patterns.

=== Moombahsoul ===
Moombahsoul is a subgenre of moombahton with deep house influences. It combines the elements of soul, lofi, deep house and chill with moombahton backed drums and textures. David Heartbreak put together one of the genres first compilations in 2011 entitled 'HEARTBREAK presents MOOMBAHSOUL'. The 15 track compilation included tracks by Munchi, Heartbreak, DJ Theory & More.

== See also ==
- House music
- Reggaeton
- List of moombahcore musicians
- Dubstep
- Deep house
