= Mad Decent =

American record label

- Founded: 2006; 20 years ago Philadelphia, Pennsylvania
- Founder: Diplo
- Distributors: AMPED Distribution (US); Because Music (France)
- Genre: Trap; moombahton; hip hop; dancehall; Jersey club; EDM
- Country of origin: United States
- Location: Los Angeles, California
- Official website: maddecent.com

Mad Decent is an American record label founded by Diplo. The label has helped introduce Brazilian baile funk and Angolan kuduro to clubs around the world. In the early 2010s, it popularized moombahton, a genre of electronic dance music created by DJ Dave Nada. The genre on the label was mostly popularized by Dillon Francis after collaborating with Diplo on Francis' 2012 track "Que Que". The label is also known for its series of concerts in major cities known as the Mad Decent Block Party.

== History ==
Mad Decent was founded in 2006 by Diplo. In 2010, the label moved from Philadelphia to Los Angeles. In 2011, it announced the launch of the imprint label Jeffree's as "an outlet to curate and promote new music that errs on the side of experimental, in keeping with the label’s original mission."

The label gained more attention in 2012 and 2013, with the worldwide success of Baauer's single "Harlem Shake", which went viral on YouTube.

Since 2008 the label has created a multiple city Mad Decent Block Party tour throughout the United States. The travelling festival began at a much smaller scale with simply a rented tent, dunk tank and barbecue on a Philadelphia street (Block of 12th St. and Spring Garden St.). The event is in line with the overall concept of the label showcasing global pop and dance music. The featured artists at the events have expanded from featuring Mad Decent's roster to high-profile artists including Matt and Kim and Outkast.

For Christmas 2013 the label re-released various singles from the label mixed with Christmas songs. The tracks were compiled into an eight-track EP titled A Very Decent Christmas. Mad Decent has since released four Christmas albums on the label since then.

In 2015, Mad Decent released Major Lazer's "Lean On," which Spotify named the most streamed song of all time that year. In 2016, Mad Decent launched a sub-label, Good Enuff, which opened with the song "Echoes" by Fossa Beats.

== Associated artists ==
- 100 gecs
- Anna Lunoe
- Ape Drums
- Baauer
- Blaqstarr
- Boombox Cartel
- Cake Pop
- CMC$
- Danny L Harle
- Dawn Golden
- Dillon Francis
- Diplo
- DJ Snake
- Dylan Brady
- Eartheater
- Foodman
- Good Times Ahead
- Haiku Hands
- Jada Kingdom
- Jam City
- Kito
- Lonely God
- Major Lazer
- Merry Lamb Lamb
- Mitch Murder
- MRD
- Mr Eazi
- Ms Nina
- Nghtmre
- NxxxxxS
- Omar Souleyman
- Party Favor
- Poppy
- Riff Raff
- Rusko
- Sak Noel
- Sebastian Paul
- Snow Strippers
- TroyBoi
- Valentino Khan
- Walshy Fire
- Wax Motif
- Yellow Claw
- Zeds Dead

== Labels ==
Through the label's Decent Distribution service, Mad Decent has distributed the following labels:

- Chemical X
- Dog Show Records (run by 100 gecs member Dylan Brady)
- Good Enuff
- Higher Ground
- Jeffree's
- Pizzaslime
- Surf Gang Records (the primary label for the New-York based rap collective Surf Gang founded by evilgiane)

== See also ==
- Lists of record labels
