= Dillon Francis =

American electronic music producer and DJ (born 1987)

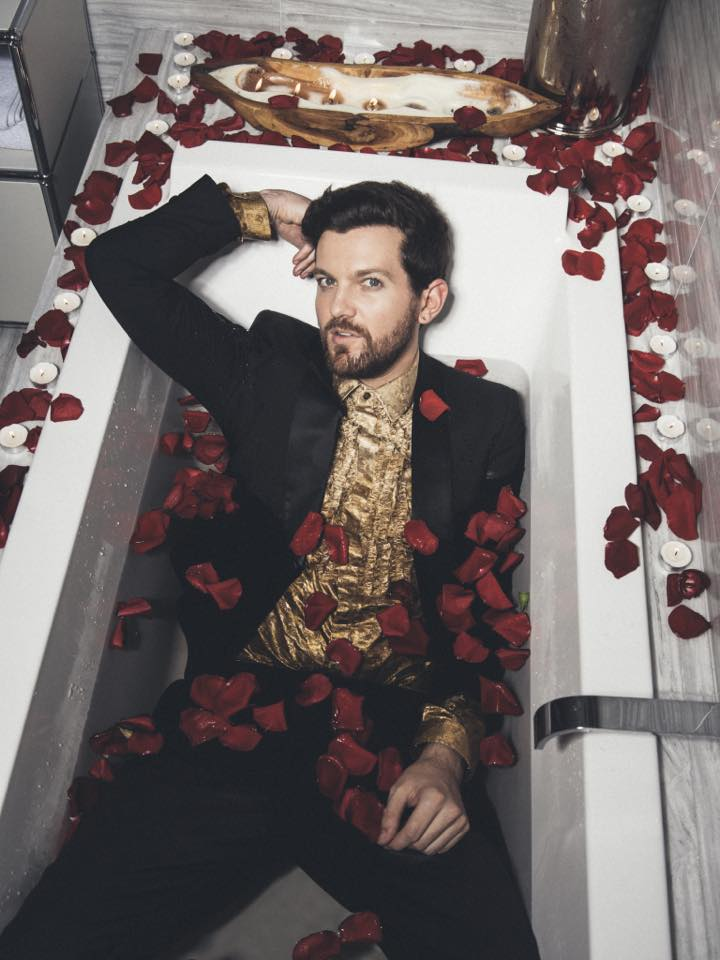
- Francis in 2018

Background information
- Also known as: DJ Hanzel
- Born: Dillon Hart Francis; October 5, 1987 (age 39); Los Angeles, California, U.S.
- Genres: EDM; moombahton; trap; electro house
- Occupations: DJ; record producer
- Years active: 2010–present
- Labels: Astralwerks; Columbia; IDGAFOS; Mad Decent; Owsla; One Deeper; Stmpd
- Website: dillonfrancis.com

Dillon Hart Francis (born October 5, 1987) is an American electronic music producer and DJ. He played a key role in popularizing moombahton and later developed its heavier variants, moombahcore and EDM trap.

== Early life and education ==
Dillon Hart Francis was born on October 5, 1987, in Los Angeles, to an American father who works in alternative medicine, and a Serbo-Croatian mother. He described his upbringing as sheltered, noting he did not learn swear words until the age of 15 and was only allowed to watch television after viewing two hours of Sesame Street.

He attended Los Angeles County High School for the Arts, where he took a course that emphasized creative expression across various art forms. He then briefly enrolled at Santa Monica College before leaving to pursue a music career. With $500, he moved to Atlanta to work with a friend but later returned to Los Angeles to focus on DJing. He credited his parents for their support while also encouraging financial responsibility by requiring him to pay rent, which they later returned when he moved out.

== Career ==
=== 2010–2013 ===
Francis gained recognition after American producer Diplo noticed him, leading to their collaboration on the track "Que Que" featuring Maluca. His song "Masta Blasta," originally a 130 BPM house track, was transformed into a moombahton track inspired by Dutch DJ Munchi. In 2010, Francis released the Swashbuckler EP on Play Me Records. In 2012, he released singles including "I.D.G.A.F.O.S." and "Bootleg Fireworks (Burning Up)" and released music through labels such as Dim Mak Records, Mad Decent, and Owsla.

In February 2012, he became the first moombahton artist to reach number one on the Beatport releases chart with his EP Something, Something, Awesome. Later that year, he toured North America on the Wet & Reckless tour and supported Nero and Flux Pavilion on their respective tours.

In 2013, he announced the headlining Wurld Turr tour across the US and Canada and confirmed his debut album for release that year, though it was delayed. He was listed by MTV Clubland as an artist to watch in 2013 and performed at several major music festivals including Camp Bisco, Electric Daisy Carnival, Coachella, TomorrowWorld, Ultra, and Electric Zoo. Francis also formed the comedy duo Meowski666 with Kill the Noise. In October 2013, he ranked number 73 in the DJ Mag Top 100 poll.

=== 2014 ===
Francis released his major-label debut album, Money Sucks, Friends Rule, on October 28, 2014, through Mad Decent and Columbia Records. The album featured collaborations with artists such as Twista, Brendon Urie, and Major Lazer. His single "Get Low" with DJ Snake was released in February 2014. He toured extensively in support of the album during the Friends Rule Tour.

=== 2015–2017 ===
In early 2015, Francis announced plans to produce a sketch show pilot for MTV. That year, he released the EP This Mixtape Is Fire, returning to his moombahton style with collaborations from Skrillex, Calvin Harris, and others. The EP reached number one on Billboard's Top Dance/Electronic Albums chart.

In 2016, he released singles including "Need You," "Candy," and "Anywhere." In April 2017, he released the single "Say Less" featuring G-Eazy. Shortly after, he parted ways with Columbia Records to pursue independent releases, announcing plans to return to moombahton. During this period, he created alter egos including "Emo Preston," performing under this persona in Los Angeles.

=== 2018 ===
Francis released the Spanish-language album Wut Wut in 2018, marking a return to moombahton. The album received nominations for a Latin Grammy and a Latin American Music Award, notably for the single "Sexo" with Residente featuring iLe. Additional singles released include "We The Funk," "BaBaBa (Vete Pa'Ya)," "Never Let You Go," and "White Boi". He headlined the Hard Summer Music Festival and released the comedy series Like and Subscribe through Funny or Die. Francis appeared on the first season of Taskmaster US. In December, he contributed "LFGD" to the compilation album Ninjawerks Volume 1.

=== 2019 ===
In January 2019, Francis released "Lost My Mind" with Alison Wonderland and launched the Lost My Mind Tour in the US. In March, he released "Change Your Mind" featuring Lovelytheband. He also contributed to the soundtrack of The Lego Movie 2: The Second Part with the song "Catchy Song," featuring T-Pain and That Girl Lay Lay.

=== 2020–2023 ===
Francis performed at the Fortnite Party Royale premiere in May 2020 alongside Steve Aoki and Deadmau5. In 2023, he released the single "Free" with Alesso and Clementine Douglas, described as a track promoting happiness.

=== 2025 ===
In 2025, Francis and Grammy-winning producer Albert Hype launched Sorry My Love, a pop-punk project inspired by their shared emo and punk influences. Their debut single, "Forget," featuring Waterparks, premiered with a music video on MTV and Times Square billboards. The project blends pop-punk and Latin elements, reflecting the artists' early musical roots.

== Personal life ==
In May 2025, Francis publicly announced that he had reconciled with fellow electronic music artist DJ Snake, ending a six-year estrangement that began around 2019. The details of their falling out were not disclosed.

== Discography ==
- Money Sucks, Friends Rule (2014)
- Wut Wut (2018)
- Happy Machine (2021)

== Filmography ==
| Year | Title | Role | Notes |
|---|---|---|---|
| 2015 | Scouts Guide to the Zombie Apocalypse | DJ | |
| 2015 | We Are Your Friends | Devin Andrews | |
| 2016 | Succeeding at Life | Background Actors | Television film |
| 2017 | Hot Ones | Himself | Talk Show; Episode: "Dillon Francis Hurts His Body with Spicy Wings" |
| 2017 | What Would Diplo Do? | Jasper | 4 episodes |
| 2018 | Like and Subscribe | Skyy Goldwynne | 7 episodes |
| 2018 | Public Disturbance | Himself | |
| 2018 | Taskmaster (US) | Himself / Contestant | |
| 2020 | The Sauce | Himself / Judge | Episode: "Miami Heat" |
| 2022 | Saints Row | Himself | |
| 2023 | Trolls Band Together | Kid Ritz | Cameo and First animated film role |
| TBA | Emberville | Unannounced role | Video game; In production |

== Awards and nominations ==
| Award Ceremony | Year | Work | Category | Result |
|---|---|---|---|---|
| Latin American Music Awards of 2018 | 2018 | Sexo (with Residente ft. iLe) | Best Short Form Music Video | Nominated |
| 19th Annual Latin Grammy Awards | 2018 | Sexo (with Residente ft. iLe) | Favorite Video | Nominated |
| Berlin Music Video Awards | 2016 | Not Butter | Best Director | Nominated |
| Berlin Music Video Awards | 2020 | Still Not Butter | Most Trashy | Nominated |
| Berlin Music Video Awards | 2024 | LA On Acid | Most Trashy | Won |
