= Far East Movement discography =

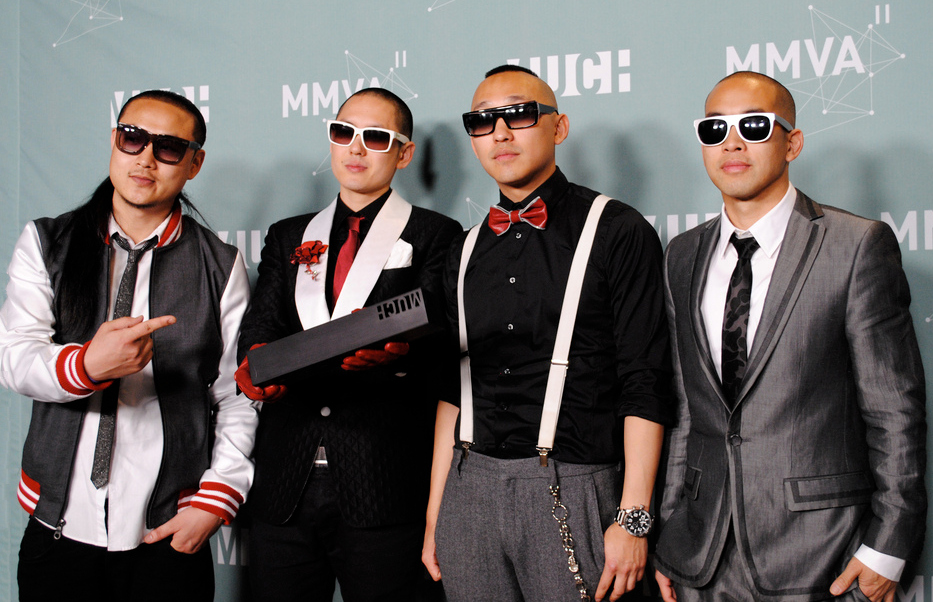
- Far East Movement at the 2011 MuchMusic Video Awards
- Studio albums: 5
- Extended plays: 4
- Singles: 36
- Music videos: 39
- Mixtapes: 5

The discography of Far East Movement, an American electronic pop rap group, consists of five studio albums, four extended plays, five mixtapes, thirty-six singles (including eight as featured artists) and thirty-nine music videos (including four as featured artists). The group formed in 2003 in Los Angeles and released their first mixtape, Audio-Bio, in 2005, with their first studio album Folk Music following in 2006. One of the songs from Folk Music, "Round Round", brought the group their first major exposure after its use in the film The Fast and the Furious: Tokyo Drift. The release of their second studio album, Animal, brought the group to the attention to the Interscope Records subsidiary Cherrytree Records, who signed them.

In 2010, Far East Movement found commercial success with the single "Like a G6", which features singer Dev and producers The Cataracs. It topped the US Billboard Hot 100, later being certified quadruple platinum by the Recording Industry Association of America (RIAA), and reached the top ten of several other national charts, including number one in New Zealand. Its parent album, Free Wired, peaked at number 24 on the US Billboard 200, and featured four further singles: "Rocketeer", which reached number seven on the Billboard Hot 100, "2 Is Better", "2gether" and "If I Was You (OMG)".

Their following album, Dirty Bass, failed to match the commercial success of its predecessor, only reaching number 190 on the Billboard 200, although the first single, "Live My Life" – a collaboration with singer Justin Bieber – reached the top ten of the Swiss and United Kingdom singles charts, and "Turn Up the Love" reached the top ten in Australia and New Zealand. Two other singles from Dirty Bass, "For All" and "Change Your Life", achieved little success of major music charts. Far East Movement found commercial success in 2013 after appearing on "Get Up (Rattle)" by Dutch music producers Bingo Players, which became their first song to top the UK Singles Chart.

== Albums ==
=== Studio albums ===
List of studio albums, with selected chart positions and sales figures
Title	Album details	Peak chart positions										Sales
Title	Album details	US	US Rap	AUS	BEL (FL)	CAN	GER	KOR	NZ	SWI	UK	Sales
Folk Music	Released: August 4, 2006 (US); Label: Catch Music Group; Formats: CD, digital download	—	—	—	—	—	—	—	—	—	—	
Animal	Released: January 27, 2009 (US); Label: Hunnypot; Formats: CD, digital download	—	—	—	—	—	—	—	—	—	—	
Free Wired	Released: October 12, 2010 (US); Label: Cherrytree, Interscope; Formats: CD, digital download	24	4	65	—	16	—	34	—	—	63	US: 175,000
Dirty Bass	Released: June 12, 2012 (US); Label: Cherrytree, Interscope; Formats: CD, digital download	190	—	37	186	25	95	37	23	78	—	
Identity	Released: October 21, 2016 (US); Label: Transparent Agency, Spinnin'; Formats: CD, digital download	—	—	—	—	—	—	51	—	—	—	
"—" denotes a recording that did not chart or was not released in that territory.

=== Mixtapes ===
List of mixtapes
Title	Album details
Audio-Bio	Released: April 29, 2005 (US); Label: Catch Music Group; Formats: CD
Flavored Animal Droppings	Released: August 8, 2007 (US); Label: Catch Music Group; Formats: CD
Party Animal	Released: November 5, 2009 (US); Label: Catch Music Group; Formats: CD
Bump from the Trunk Vol. 1	Released: November 29, 2011 (US); Label: Cherrytree, Interscope; Formats: Digital download
Grzzly	Released: May 29, 2013 (US); Label: Cherrytree, Interscope; Formats: Digital download

== Extended plays ==
List of extended plays
Title	EP details
For the Folks n' Family	Released: May 30, 2006 (US); Label: Catch Music Group; Formats: CD
FM Radio Singles	Released: September 16, 2008 (US); Label: Catch Music Group; Formats: Digital download
Murder Was the Bass (with Rell the Soundbender)	Released: May 12, 2013 (US); Label: Cherrytree; Formats: Digital download
KTown Riot	Released: October 28, 2014 (US); Label: Cherrytree; Formats: Digital download

== Singles ==
=== As lead artist ===
List of singles as lead artist, with selected chart positions and certifications, showing year released and album name
Title	Year	Peak chart positions										Certifications	Album
Title	Year	US	AUS	BEL	CAN	GER	IRL	NZ	SWE	SWI	UK	Certifications	Album
"Lowridin'" (featuring Wiz Khalifa and Bionik)	2007	—	—	—	—	—	—	—	—	—	—		Animal
"You've Got a Friend" (featuring Lil Rob and Baby Bash)	2007	—	—	—	—	—	—	—	—	—	—		Animal
"Girls on the Dance Floor" (with Stereotypes)	2010	—	—	—	—	—	—	—	—	—	—		Animal
"Like a G6" (featuring The Cataracs and Dev)	2010	1	2	2	3	15	12	1	7	10	5	RIAA: 4× Platinum; ARIA: 3× Platinum; BEA: Gold; BPI: 2× Platinum; BVMI: Platinum; IFPI SWE: Gold; IFPI SWI: Gold; RMNZ: Platinum	Free Wired
"Rocketeer" (featuring Ryan Tedder)	2010	7	14	— (Note: "Rocketeer" did not enter the Flanders Ultratop 50, but peaked at number nine on the Ultratip chart.)	22	40	25	4	—	—	14	ARIA: Platinum; RMNZ: 2× Platinum	Free Wired
"2 Is Better" (featuring Natalia Kills and Ya Boy)	2011	—	—	—	—	—	—	—	—	—	—		Free Wired
"2gether" (with Roger Sanchez, featuring Kanobby)	2011	—	—	— (Note: "2gether" did not enter the Flanders Ultratop 50, but peaked at number six on the Ultratip chart.)	—	—	—	—	—	—	92		Free Wired
"If I Was You (OMG)" (featuring Snoop Dogg)	2011	—	63	— (Note: "If I Was You (OMG)" did not enter the Flanders Ultratop 50, but peaked at number seven on the Ultratip chart.)	93	—	—	18	—	—	—		Free Wired
"Jello" (featuring Rye Rye)	2011	—	—	— (Note: "Jello" did not enter the Flanders Ultratop 50, but peaked at number 72 on the Ultratip chart.)	—	—	—	—	—	—	—		Non-album single
"Live My Life" (featuring Justin Bieber)	2012	21	14	39	4	8	6	15	13	6	7	ARIA: Platinum; RMNZ: Gold; BVMI: Gold	Dirty Bass
"Dirty Bass" (featuring Tyga)	2012	—	—	—	—	—	—	—	—	—	—		Dirty Bass
"Turn Up the Love" (featuring Cover Drive)	2012	—	8	— (Note: "Turn Up the Love" did not enter the Wallonia Ultratop 50, but peaked at number 25 on the Ultratip chart.)	—	—	14	8	23	55	13	ARIA: 2× Platinum; BPI: Silver; RMNZ: Gold	Dirty Bass
"Change Your Life" (featuring Flo Rida and Sidney Samson)	2012	—	60	—	—	91	—	—	—	—	—		Dirty Bass
"The Illest" (featuring Riff Raff)	2013	— (Note: "The Illest" did not enter the Billboard Hot 100, but peaked at number seven on the Bubbling Under Hot 100 Singles chart.)	—	—	—	—	—	—	—	—	—		Dirty Bass (Special Edition)
"The Illest" (featuring Schoolboy Q)	2014	—	—	—	—	—	—	—	—	—	—		KTown Riot
"Ruthless" (with Alvita featuring Ginette Claudette)	2014	—	—	—	—	—	—	—	—	—	—		Far East Movement & Alvita EP (SoundCloud)
"Movement" (with Alvita)	2014	—	—	—	—	—	—	—	—	—	—		Far East Movement & Alvita EP (SoundCloud)
"Bang It to the Curb" (with Sidney Samson)	2014	—	—	—	—	—	—	—	—	—	—		KTown Riot
"Surrounded" (with T-Mass featuring JVZEL)	2015	—	—	—	—	—	—	—	—	—	—		Non-album singles
"Push" (with Kronic and Savage)	2015	—	—	—	—	—	—	—	—	—	—		Non-album singles
"Freal Luv" (with Marshmello featuring Chanyeol and Tinashe)	2016	—	—	—	—	—	—	—	—	—	—		Identity
"Don't Speak" (featuring Tiffany and King Chain)	2017	—	—	—	—	—	—	—	—	—	—		Identity
"Bamboo" (featuring Jason Zhang and Kina Grannis)	2018	—	—	—	—	—	—	—	—	—	—		Non-album singles
"Bad Habit" (featuring Justine Skye and Air)	2018	—	—	—	—	—	—	—	—	—	—		Non-album singles
"Blossoms" (featuring Vava and Troop Brand)	2019	—	—	—	—	—	—	—	—	—	—		Non-album singles
"Lovebird" (featuring Lay)	2019	—	—	—	—	—	—	—	—	—	—		Non-album singles
"Paint the Clouds" (featuring Tia Ray)	2019	—	—	—	—	—	—	—	—	—	—		Non-album singles
"Maps" (featuring Diamond, Starchild Yeezo and Rell the Soundbender)	2019	—	—	—	—	—	—	—	—	—	—		Non-album singles
"Glue" (featuring Heize and Shawn Wasabi)	2019	—	—	—	—	—	—	—	—	—	—		Non-album singles
"Nice Things" (with Henry and AlunaGeorge)	2020	—	—	—	—	—	—	—	—	—	—		Non-album singles
"Let the Future In" (with Karen Mok)	2020	—	—	—	—	—	—	—	—	—	—		Non-album singles
"We Are the Truth" (featuring Sha Sha Jones)	2020	—	—	—	—	—	—	—	—	—	—		Non-album singles
"—" denotes a recording that did not chart or was not released in that territory.

=== As featured artist ===
List of singles as featured artist, with selected chart positions and certifications, showing year released and album name
Title	Year	Peak chart positions									Certifications	Album
Title	Year	AUS	BEL (WA)	CAN	GER	IRL	NLD	NZ	SWI	UK	Certifications	Album
"Do It in the AM" (Frankmusik featuring Far East Movement)	2011	—	—	—	—	—	—	—	—	—		Do It in the AM
"Lights Out (Go Crazy)" (Junior Caldera featuring Natalia Kills and Far East Movement)	2012	—	—	85	—	—	—	—	—	—		Non-album singles
"Get Up (Rattle)" (Bingo Players featuring Far East Movement)	2012	4	4	51	22	5	19	25	24	1	ARIA: Platinum; BPI: Platinum; BVMI: Gold; MC: Gold	Non-album singles
"Break Yourself" (Hook N Sling featuring Far East Movement)	2015	—	—	—	—	—	—	—	—	—		Non-album singles
"Whiplash" (Sidney Samson featuring Far East Movement)	2015	—	—	—	—	—	—	—	—	—		Non-album singles
"Business" (Doctor P featuring Far East Movement)	2015	—	—	—	—	—	—	—	—	—		Non-album singles
"When the Funk Drops" (Deorro and Uberjack'd featuring Far East Movement)	2016	—	—	—	—	—	—	—	—	—		Non-album singles
"Criminal" (Rell the Soundbender featuring Los Rakas and Far East Movement)	2016	—	—	—	—	—	—	—	—	—		Palante
"—" denotes a recording that did not chart or was not released in that territory.

== Guest appearances ==
List of non-single guest appearances, with other performing artists, showing year released and album name
Title	Year	Other artist(s)	Album
"Suga"	2005	Snacky Chan	The Killa Tape
"Food Fight"	2006	Jin	100 Grand Jin
"Ride 4 You"	2012	Chip tha Ripper, Kid Cudi	Tell Ya Friends
"Turn Up the Radio" (Laidback Luke remix)	2012	Madonna	"Turn Up the Radio" Digital Remixes EP
"So Alive"	2013	Wiley	The Ascent
"Rock the Movement"	2014	3Ball MTY	Globall
"Novacain"	2016	Brennan Heart, Casey K	I Am Hardstyle
"Mo Bounce"	2017	Iggy Azalea	Non-album single

== Music videos ==
=== As lead artist ===
List of music videos as lead artist, with directors, showing year released
Title	Year	Director(s)
"Food Fight" (featuring Jin)	2004	Todd Angkasuwan
"Round Round" (featuring Storm)	2006	Evan Jackson Leong
"Western" (featuring Mike-C)	2006	Evan Jackson Leong
"Eyes Never Lie" (featuring Mary Jane)	2006	Hosanna Wong
"Holla Hey"	2006	Todd Angkasuwan
"Smile" (featuring Ken Oak)	2006	Todd Angkasuwan
"You've Got a Friend" (featuring Lil Rob and Baby Bash)	2007	Todd Angkasuwan
"Satisfaction"	2007	Evan Jackson Leong
"I Party" (featuring IZ and DB Tonik)	2008	Choz Belen
"Dance Like Michael Jackson"	2008	Wong Fu Productions
"Fetish"	2009	Iron Brothers Entertainment
"Lowridin'" (featuring Wiz Khalifa and Bionik)	2009	Iron Brothers Entertainment
"Fuck the Robots"	2010	Arowana Films
"Go Ape" (featuring Lil Jon and Colette Carr)	2010	Martin Kierszenbaum, Andrea Ruffalo
"Girls on the Dance Floor" (with Stereotypes)	2010	Emperor Chung
"Like a G6" (featuring The Cataracs and Dev)	2010	Matt Alonzo
"Rocketeer" (featuring Ryan Tedder)	2010	Marc Klasfeld
"2gether" (with Roger Sanchez, featuring Kanobby)	2010	—N/a
"2 Is Better" (featuring Natalia Kills and Ya Boy)	2011	G.
"If I Was You (OMG)" (featuring Snoop Dogg)	2011	G.
"So What?"	2011	G.
"If I Was You (OMG)" (On Campus Remix) (featuring Snoop Dogg)	2011	Daniel Park
"Jello" (featuring Rye Rye)	2012	Matt Alonzo
"Live My Life" (featuring Justin Bieber)	2012	Mickey Finnegan
"Live My Life" (Party Rock Remix) (featuring Justin Bieber and Redfoo)	2012	Mickey Finnegan
"Dirty Bass" (featuring Tyga)	2012	Transparent Agency
"Turn Up the Love" (featuring Cover Drive)	2012	Matt Alonzo
"Little Bird"	2012	Phil
"For All"	2012	Austin Saya
"Change Your Life" (featuring Flo Rida and Sidney Samson)	2012	Hyperballad
"Christmas In Downtown LA" (featuring MNEK)	2012	DPD
"Ain't Coming Down" (Yeah I'm Trippin Mix) (with Rell the Soundbender, featuring Matthew Koma and Sidney Samson)	2013	Denny Kim
"The Illest" (featuring Riff Raff)	2013	Mike Clattenburg
"The Illest" (Ktown Riot Edit) (featuring Riff Raff)	2013	Denny Kim
"Bang It to the Curb" (featuring Sidney Samson)	2014	Jay Ahn

=== As featured artist ===
List of music videos as featured artist, with directors, showing year released
Title	Year	Director(s)
"Do It in the AM" (Frankmusik featuring Far East Movement)	2011	Emil Nava
"Lights Out (Go Crazy)" (Junior Caldera featuring Natalia Kills and Far East Movement)	2012	G.
"Get Up (Rattle)" (Bingo Players featuring Far East Movement)	2012	Tim Hope
"Break Yourself" (Hook N Sling featuring Far East Movement)	2015	Carlos López Estrada, Nelson De Castro
