= Ricky Reed =

American artist, music producer, and songwriter (born 1982)

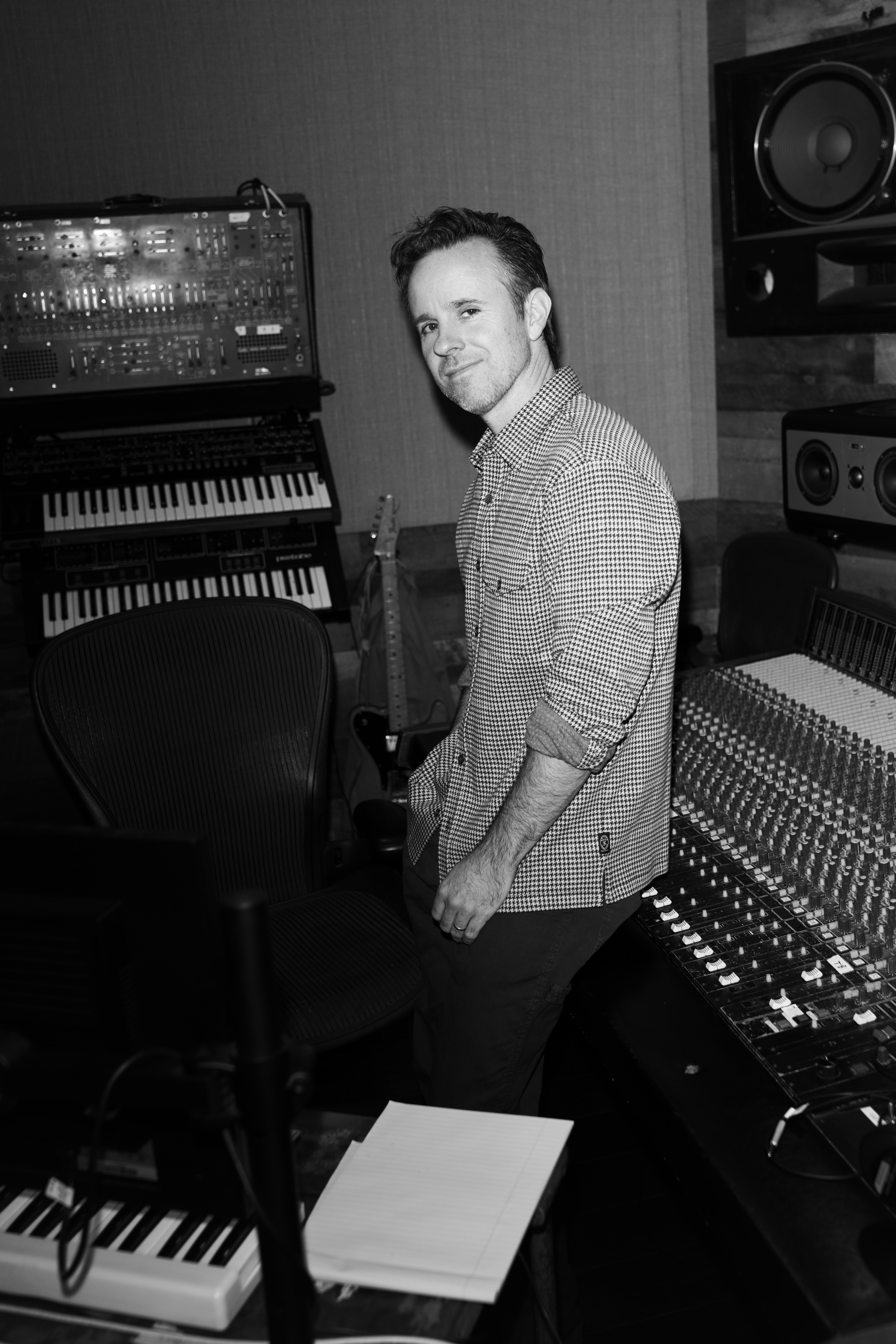
- Reed in 2022

Background information
- Born: Eric Burton Frederic; July 23, 1982 (age 44)
- Genres: Hip-hop; pop; electronic
- Occupations: Record producer; singer; songwriter
- Years active: 2001–present
- Labels: Nice Life; Boardwalk; Epic
- Formerly of: Facing New York; Wallpaper.

Eric Burton Frederic (born July 23, 1982), known professionally as Ricky Reed, is an American record producer, singer, songwriter, and the founder of Nice Life Recording Company. In 2005, he formed the musical project Wallpaper., which lasted until 2014.

== Early work ==
He was the lead singer of the Bay Area band Locale A.M. from 2001–2004.

== Awards and nominations ==
Reed has received RIAA platinum records for two Jason Derulo singles: "Talk Dirty" ft. 2 Chainz (4× Platinum) and "Wiggle" ft. Snoop Dogg (2× Platinum).

In 2015, Reed received a BMI Pop Award for his work on "Talk Dirty".

Award	Year	Recipient(s) and nominee(s)	Category	Result	Ref.
Grammy Awards	2017	Himself	Producer of the Year, Non-Classical	Nominated	
Grammy Awards	2020	"Truth Hurts"	Record of the Year	Nominated	
Grammy Awards	2020	"Truth Hurts"	Song of the Year	Nominated	
Grammy Awards	2020	Cuz I Love You (Deluxe)	Album of the Year	Nominated	
Grammy Awards	2020	Cuz I Love You (Deluxe)	Best Urban Contemporary Album	Won	
Grammy Awards	2020	Himself	Producer of the Year, Non-Classical	Nominated	
Grammy Awards	2022	We Are	Album of the Year	Won	
Grammy Awards	2022	Himself	Producer of the Year, Non-Classical	Nominated	
Grammy Awards	2023	Special	Album of the Year	Nominated	
Grammy Awards	2023	"About Damn Time"	Record of the Year	Won	
Grammy Awards	2023	"About Damn Time"	Song of the Year	Nominated	

== Discography ==
=== Albums ===
- Ricky Reed Is Real (as Wallpaper, 2013)
- The Room (2020)

=== Singles ===
- "Express Myself" (2016) (Written by: Ricky Reed) (Produced by: Ricky Reed)
- "Be The 1" (2017) (Written by: Ricky Reed, LunchMoney Lewis, Teddy Geiger, Alex Van Halen, Edward Van Halen, David Lee Roth) (Produced by: Ricky Reed)
- "Joan of Arc" (2017) (Written by: Ricky Reed, Mark Foster, Charli XCX, Wayne Hector, James Fauntleroy, Joe London) (Produced by: Ricky Reed, Mark Foster (co.))
- "Good Vibrations" (2017) (Written by: Ricky Reed, Jason Derulo, Clarence Coffee Jr., Nate Mercereau, Joe London, Toby Wincorn, Tom Peyton) (Produced by: Ricky Reed)

=== Songwriting and production credits ===
Title	Year	Artist(s)	Album	Credits	Written with	Produced with
"Anyway"	2011	CeeLo Green	The Lady Killer: The; Platinum Edition	Co-writer/Producer	Thomas Callaway, Ross Golan, Rivers Cuomo, Joshua Alexander	Daniel Ledinsky
"Turn Up the Love" (featuring Cover Drive)	2012	Far East Movement	Dirty Bass	Co-writer/Producer	Jae Choung, James Roh, Kevin Nishimura, Virman Coquia, Andreas Schuller, Matthew Bair	Axident
"The Illest" (featuring Riff Raff)	2013	Far East Movement	Dirty Bass	Co-writer/Producer	Jae Choung, James Roh, Kevin Nishimura, Virman Coquia, Andreas Schuller, Horst Simco	Axident
"Girl Next Door"	2013	Emblem3	Nothing to Lose	Co-writer/Producer	Drew Chadwick, Keaton Stromberg, Wesley Stromberg, Evan Bogart	–
"Talk Dirty" (featuring 2 Chainz)	2013	Jason Derulo	Tattoos	Co-writer/Producer	Jason Desrouleaux, Tauheed Epps, Jason Evigan, Sean Douglas, Ori Kaplan, Tamir Muskat, Tomer Yosef	–
"Woohoo"	2013	Eli Paperboy Reed	Nights Like This	Co-writer/Producer	Eli Musock, Ross Golan, Andreas Schuller	Eli Paperboy Reed, Ryan Spraker, Axident
"Side FX" (featuring The Game)	2013	Jason Derulo	Tattoos	Co-writer/Producer	Jason Desrouleaux, Sean Douglas, Joe Spargur, Jayceon Taylor	Joe London
"Perfect Timing"	2013	Jason Derulo	Tattoos	Co-writer/Producer	Jason Desrouleaux, James Abrahart	–
"Wiggle" (featuring Snoop Dogg)	2014	Jason Derulo	Talk Dirty	Co-writer/Producer	Jason Desrouleaux, Calvin Broadus, Jacob Kasher Hindlin, Sean Douglas, John Ryan II, Joe Spargur, Andreas Schuller	Axident, John Ryan, Joe London
"BO$$"	2014	Fifth Harmony	Reflection	Co-writer/Producer	Taylor Parks, Joe Spargur, Daniel Kyriakides, Gamal Lewis, Jacob Kasher Hindlin	Joe London, Daylight
"Fireball" (featuring JRY)	2014	Pitbull	Globalization	Co-writer/Producer	Armando Perez, John Ryan II, Andreas Schuller, Joe Spargur, Thomas Peyton, Ilsey Juber	Axident, John Ryan, Joe London
"Everywhere I Go (Kings & Queens)"	2014	New Politics	Vikings	Co-writer/Producer	David Boyd, Søren Hansen, Louis Vecchio, John Ryan II, Thomas Peyton, Joshua Moran, Thomas Schlieter	John Ryan
"Never Been in Love" (featuring Icona Pop)	2014	Cobra Starship	Non-album single	Co-writer/Producer	Gabriel Saporta, John Ryan II, Norman Cook, Camille Yarbrough	John Ryan
"Burnin' Up" (featuring 2 Chainz)	2014	Jessie J	Sweet Talker	Co-writer/Producer	Jessieca Cornish, Andreas Schuller, Chloe Angelides, Jacob Kasher Hindlin, Rickard Goransson, Gamal Lewis, Tauheed Epps	Axident
"Dazed and Confused" (featuring Travie McCoy)	2014	Jake Miler	Dazed & Confused EP	Co-writer/Producer	Jake Miller, Jacob Kasher Hindlin, Carlos Battey, Steven Battey	–
"Lion Heart"	2014	Jake Miler	Dazed & Confused EP	Co-writer/Producer	Jake Miller, Andreas Schuller, Jacob Kasher Hindlin	Axident
"Day Drinking" (featuring Heymous Molly)	2014	Pitbull	Globalization	Co-writer/Producer	Armando Perez, John Ryan II, Andreas Schuller, Joe Spargur	Axident, John Ryan, Joe London
"Midnight Train"	2014	Union J	You Got It All	Co-writer/Producer	Thomas Peyton, John Ryan II, Andreas Schuller, Joe Spargur, Jonnali Parmenius	Joe London
"Bills"	2015	LunchMoney Lewis	Bills EP	Co-writer/Producer	Gamal Lewis, Jacob Kasher Hindlin, Rickard Goransson	–
"Make Out"	2015	Rixton	Let the Road	Co-writer/Producer	Benjamin Levin, Ammar Malik	Benny Blanco
"Fairly Local"	2015	Twenty One Pilots	Blurryface	Producer	–	–
"Karaoke"	2015	Smallpools	Lovetap!	Co-writer/Producer	Sean Scanlon, Mike Kamerman, Beau Kuther, John Ryan II, Thomas Peyton	–
"Headlights" (featuring Ilsey)	2015	Robin Schulz	Sugar	Co-writer	Robin Schulz, Ilsey Juber, John Ryan II, Andreas Schuller, Thomas Peyton, Joe Spargur	–
"Mama"	2015	LunchMoney Lewis	Bills EP	Co-writer/Producer	Gamal Lewis, Jacob Kasher Hindlin, Peter Svensson	–
"Love Me Back"	2015	LunchMoney Lewis	Bills EP	Co-writer/Producer	Gamal Lewis, Jacob Kasher Hindlin, Jason Evigan	–
"Real Thing"	2015	LunchMoney Lewis	Bills EP	Co-writer/Producer	Gamal Lewis, Jacob Kasher Hindlin, John Theodore Geiger II, Joe Spargur	Joe London
"Tear in My Heart"	2015	Twenty One Pilots	Blurryface	Producer	–	–
"Lane Boy"	2015	Twenty One Pilots	Blurryface	Producer	–	–
"Heavydirtysoul"	2015	Twenty One Pilots	Blurryface	Producer	–	–
"Ride"	2015	Twenty One Pilots	Blurryface	Producer	–	–
"Doubt"	2015	Twenty One Pilots	Blurryface	Producer	–	–
"We Don't Believe What's on TV"	2015	Twenty One Pilots	Blurryface	Producer	–	–
"Goner"	2015	Twenty One Pilots	Blurryface	Producer	–	–
"Emergency"	2015	Icona Pop	Emergency EP	Co-writer/Producer	Aino Jawo, Caroline Hjelt, Kaj Hassle, John Theodore Geiger II, Thomas Peyton, Antonio Puntillo, Luca Citandini, Gianfranco Bortolotti, Diego Leoni	–
"Get Ugly"	2015	Jason Derulo	Everything Is 4	Co-writer/Producer	Jason Desrouleaux, Jason Evigan, Sean Douglas	–
"Amanecer"	2015	Bomba Estéreo	Amanecer	Co-writer/Producer	Liliana Saumet, Julian Salazar, Simon Mejia, Joe Spargur	Joe London
"Caderas"	2015	Bomba Estéreo	Amanecer	Co-writer/Producer	Liliana Saumet, Simon Mejia, Joe Spargur	Joe London
"Somos Dos"	2015	Bomba Estéreo	Amanecer	Producer	–	Joe London
"Soy Yo"	2015	Bomba Estéreo	Amanecer	Co-writer/Producer	Liliana Saumet, Simon Mejia, Joe Spargur	Joe London
"Fiesta"	2015	Bomba Estéreo	Amanecer	Co-writer/Producer	Liliana Saumet, Simon Mejia, Joe Spargur	Joe London
"Voy"	2015	Bomba Estéreo	Amanecer	Co-writer/Producer	Liliana Saumet, Simon Mejia, Joe Spargur	Joe London
"Algo Esta Cambiando"	2015	Bomba Estéreo	Amanecer	Co-writer/Producer	Liliana Saumet, Julien Salazar, Simon Mejia, Joe Spargur	Joe London
"Mar (Lo Que Siento)"	2015	Bomba Estéreo	Amanecer	Co-writer/Producer	Liliana Saumet, Simon Mejia, Joe Spargur	Joe London
"To My Love"	2015	Bomba Estéreo	Amanecer	Co-writer/Producer	Liliana Saumet, Julien Salazar, Simon Mejia, Joe Spargur	Joe London
"Solo Tu"	2015	Bomba Estéreo	Amanecer	Producer	–	Joe London
"Raiz"	2015	Bomba Estéreo	Amanecer	Producer	–	Joe London
"Morning Sun"	2015	Robin Thicke	Non-album single	Producer	–	–
"First Time"	2015	Icona Pop	Emergency EP	Co-writer/Producer	Aino Jawo, Caroline Hjelt, John Theodore Geiger II, Jacob Kasher Hindlin, Gamal Lewis, Bjorn Olovsson	–
"Clap Snap"	2015	Icona Pop	Emergency EP	Co-writer/Producer	Aino Jawo, Caroline Hjelt, John Theodore Geiger II, Lincoln Chase	–
"Young & Stupid" (featuring T.I.)	2015	Travis Mills	Non-album single	Co-writer/Producer	Travis Mills, Clifford Harris Jr., Ilsey Juber, Andreas Schuller, Joe Spargur, Thomas Peyton, John Ryan II	Axident, John Ryan, Joe London
"I Think We'd Feel Good Together"	2015	Rob Thomas	The Great Unknown	Producer	–	–
"Absence of Affection"	2015	Rob Thomas	The Great Unknown	Co-writer	Robert Thomas	–
"Take You Down"	2015	Rock City	What Dreams Are Made Of	Co-writer	Theron Thomas, Timothy Thomas, Lukasz Gottwald, Henry Walter	–
"Ain't Too Cool"	2015	LunchMoney Lewis	Non-album single	Co-writer/Producer	Gamal Lewis, Lukasz Gottwald, Henry Walter, Jonathan Gomez, Jacob Kasher Hindlin, Brian Dales	Dr. Luke
"Bad Man" (featuring Robin Thicke, Joe Perry & Travis Barker)	2016	Pitbull	Climate Change	Co-writer/Producer	Armando Perez, Thomas Peyton, Davey Nate, Jenny Owen Youngs	Tom Peyton, Joe London
"No"	2016	Meghan Trainor	Thank You	Co-writer/Producer	Meghan Trainor, Jacob Kasher Hindlin	–
"We Don't Have to Dance"	2016	Andy Black	The Shadow Side	Co-writer/Producer	Andy Biersack, John Friedmann, Patrick Stumph, Quinn Allman, Zakk Cervini, Matthew Pauling	John Friedman
"HandClap"	2016	Fitz and the Tantrums	Fitz and the Tantrums	Co-writer/Producer	Michael Fitzpatrick, Noelle Scaggs, Joe Kearns, James King, Jeremy Ruzumma, Jonathan Wicks, Samuel Hollander	–
"Me Too"	2016	Meghan Trainor	Thank You	Co-writer/Producer	Meghan Trainor, Jacob Kasher Hindlin, Jason Desrouleaux, Peter Svensson	–
"Watch Me Do"	2016	Meghan Trainor	Thank You	Co-writer/Producer	Meghan Trainor, Jacob Kasher Hindlin, Gamal Lewis	–
"Better" (featuring Yo Gotti)	2016	Meghan Trainor	Thank You	Co-writer/Producer	Meghan Trainor, Thomas Brown, Steve Franks, Mario Mims, Taylor Parks, Travis Sayles	Tommy Brown, Mr. Franks
"I Love Me" (with LunchMoney Lewis)	2016	Meghan Trainor	Thank You	Co-writer/Producer	Meghan Trainor, Jacob Kasher Hindlin, Gamal Lewis, Thomas Troelsen	Thomas Troelsen
"Kindly Calm Me Down"	2016	Meghan Trainor	Thank You	Co-writer/Producer	Meghan Trainor, James Morales, Matthew Morales, Julio David Rodriguez	The Elev3n
"Woman Up"	2016	Meghan Trainor	Thank You	Co-writer/Producer	Meghan Trainor, James Morales, Matthew Morales, Julio David Rodriguez, Taylor Parks, Nash Overstreet, Erika Nuri, Shane Stevens	The Elev3n
"Just a Friend to You"	2016	Meghan Trainor	Thank You	Co-writer/Producer	Meghan Trainor, Christopher Gelbuda	Chris Gelbuda
"I Won't Let You Down"	2016	Meghan Trainor	Thank You	Co-writer/Producer	Meghan Trainor, Jacob Kasher Hindlin, Gamal Lewis	–
"Dance Like Yo Daddy"	2016	Meghan Trainor	Thank You	Co-writer/Producer	Meghan Trainor, Kevin Kadish	Kevin Kadish
"Friends"	2016	Meghan Trainor	Thank You	Co-writer/Producer	Meghan Trainor, Thomas Brown, Steve Franks, Michael Foster, Ryan Tedder, Biana Atterberry	Tommy Brown, Mr. Franks
"Good as Hell"	2016	Lizzo	Coconut Oil EP / Cuz I Love You (Super Deluxe)	Co-writer/Producer	Melissa Jefferson	–
"Girls Talk Boys"	2016	5 Seconds of Summer	Ghostbusters: OST	Co-writer/Producer	John Theodore Geiger II, John Ryan II, Ammar Malik	–
"Sober" (featuring JRY)	2016	DJ Snake	Encore	Co-writer/Producer	William Grigachine, John Ryan II, John Theodore Geiger II, Ammar Malik, Karl Hyde, Richard Smith	DJ Snake, John Ryan, Teddy Geiger
"Cash Machine"	2016	DRAM	Big Baby DRAM	Co-writer/Producer	Shelley Massenburg-Smith, Ray Williams	–
"Phone"	2016	Lizzo	Coconut Oil EP	Producer	–	Jesse Shatkin
"Worship"	2016	Lizzo	Coconut Oil EP	Co-writer/Producer	Melissa Jefferson, Joe Spargur, Jose Fernandez	–
"Scuse Me"	2016	Lizzo	Coconut Oil EP	Co-writer/Producer	Melissa Jefferson, Marcus Glasser, Kehinde Hassan	Christian Rich
"Deep"	2016	Lizzo	Coconut Oil EP	Producer	–	Dubbel Dutch
"Coconut Oil"	2016	Lizzo	Coconut Oil EP	Co-writer/Producer	Melissa Jefferson, Aaron Jennings	–
"Funeral Pyre"	2016	Phantogram	Three	Co-writer/Producer	Sarah Barthel, Joshua Carter, Daniel Dodd Wilson	Josh Carter, John Hill
"Same Old Blues"	2016	Phantogram	Three	Co-writer/Producer	Sarah Barthel, Joshua Carter, Daniel Dodd Wilson, Eric Wincorn, Ernest Fowler	Josh Carter, Sarah Barthel, Dan Wilson
"You Don't Get Me High Anymore"	2016	Phantogram	Three	Co-writer/Producer	Sarah Barthel, Joshua Carter, Daniel Dodd Wilson, Edwin Bocage, Alfred Scramuzza	Josh Carter, Sarah Barthel, Dan Wilson
"Cruel World"	2016	Phantogram	Three	Co-writer/Producer	Sarah Barthel, Joshua Carter, Daniel Dodd Wilson, Lee Moses	Josh Carter, Sarah Barthel, Dan Wilson
"Barking Dog"	2016	Phantogram	Three	Co-writer/Producer	Joshua Carter, Stephen Reich	Josh Carter
"You're Mine"	2016	Phantogram	Three	Co-writer/Producer	Sarah Barthel, Joshua Carter, Daniel Dodd Wilson, Willie Clarke, Clarence Reid	Josh Carter, Sarah Barthel, Dan Wilson
"Answer"	2016	Phantogram	Three	Co-writer/Producer	Sarah Barthel, Joshua Carter, Daniel Dodd Wilson	Josh Carter
"Run Run Blood"	2016	Phantogram	Three	Co-writer/Producer	Sarah Barthel, Joshua Carter, Daniel Dodd Wilson, Terius Nash, Christopher Stewart	Josh Carter, Sarah Barthel
"Destroyer"	2016	Phantogram	Three	Co-writer/Producer	Sarah Barthel, Joshua Carter, Daniel Dodd Wilson	Josh Carter, Sarah Barthel
"Calling All"	2016	Phantogram	Three	Co-writer/Producer	Sarah Barthel, Joshua Carter, Daniel Dodd Wilson, Terius Nash, Christopher Stewart, Simeon Coxe, Stanley Warren	Josh Carter, Sarah Barthel, Dan Wilson
"Misunderstood" (featuring Young Thug)	2016	DRAM	Big Baby DRAM	Co-writer/Producer	Shelley Massenburg-Smith, Jeffery Williams	–
"Miserable America"	2016	Kevin Abstract	American Boyfriend: A Suburban Love Story	Producer	–	Michael Uzowuru, Jeff Kleinman
"American Boyfriend"	2016	Kevin Abstract	American Boyfriend: A Suburban Love Story	Producer	–	Bearface
"Swalla" (featuring Ty Dolla Sign & Nicki Minaj)	2017	Jason Derulo	Nu King	Co-writer/Producer	Jason Desrouleaux, Gamal Lewis, Jacob Kasher Hindlin, Russell Jones, Robert Diggs, Onika Maraj, Tyrone Griffin Jr.	–
"100 Letters"	2017	Halsey	Hopeless Fountain Kingdom	Co-writer/Producer	Ashley Frangipane	–
"Alone" (solo / featuring Big Sean & Stefflon Don)	2017	Halsey	Hopeless Fountain Kingdom	Co-writer/Producer	Ashley Frangipane, Daniel Dodd Wilson, Joshua Carter, Anthony Hester	Josh Carter
"Bad at Love"	2017	Halsey	Hopeless Fountain Kingdom	Co-writer/Producer	Ashley Frangipane, Justin Tranter, Roget Chahayed	Roget Chahayed
"Fuck They"	2017	Sofi Tukker	Treehouse	Producer	–	Sofi Tukker, Jon Hume
"Hymn"	2017	Kesha	Rainbow	Co-writer/Producer	Kesha Sebert, Jonathan Price, Cara Salimando, Rosmary Sebert	Jonny Price
"Bastards"	2017	Kesha	Rainbow	Producer	–	Nate Mercureau, Drew Pearson
"Learn to Let Go"	2017	Kesha	Rainbow	Producer	–	Stuart Crichton
"Finding You"	2017	Kesha	Rainbow	Co-writer/Producer	Kesha Sebert, Justin Tranter	–
"Boots"	2017	Kesha	Rainbow	Co-writer/Producer	Kesha Sebert, Justin Tranter, Roget Chahayed	Roget Chahayed, Nate Mercureau
"Godzilla"	2017	Kesha	Rainbow	Producer	–	Drew Pearson
"Water Me"	2017	Lizzo	Cuz I Love You (Deluxe)	Producer	–	–
"Hello"	2017	Galantis	The Aviary	Co-writer	Christian Karlsson, Linus Eklow, Jimmy "Svidden" Koitzsch, Henrik Jonback, Ross Golan, Jacob Kasher Hindlin, Ammar Malik	–
"Who I Am" (featuring LunchMoney Lewis)	2017	Maroon 5	Red Pill Blues	Co-writer/Producer	Adam Levine, Ammar Malik, Gamal Lewis, John Theodore Geiger II, John Ryan II, Jacob Kasher Hindlin	–
"Truth Hurts"	2017	Lizzo	Cuz I Love You	Producer	–	–
"Come Alive" (with Keala Settle, Daniel Everidge & Zendaya)	2017	Hugh Jackman	The Greatest Showman: OST	Producer	–	Greg Wells, Pasek and Paul, Alex Lacamoire
"Dance"	2018	DNCE	Non-album single	Co-writer/Producer	Joe Jonas, John Theodore Geiger II, John Ryan II, Cole Whittle, Ammar Malik	–
"Bet Ain't Worth the Hand"	2018	Leon Bridges	Good Thing	Co-writer/Producer	Todd Bridges, Nathaniel Mercereau, Wayne Hector, Steven Wyreman, Austin Jenkins, Joshua Block, Curtis Mayfield, Donna Missal	Nate Mercereau
"Bad Bad News"	2018	Leon Bridges	Good Thing	Co-writer/Producer	Todd Bridges, Nathaniel Mercereau, Wayne Hector, Austin Jenkins, Joshua Block	Nate Mercereau
"Fitness"	2018	Lizzo	Non-album single	Co-writer/Producer	Melissa Jefferson, Aino Jawo, Caroline Hjelt, John Theodore Geiger II, Joe Spargur, Thomas Peyton, Donna Summer, Bruce Sudano, Edward "Eddie" Hokenson, Joe "Bean" Esposito	–
"Beyond"	2018	Leon Bridges	Good Thing	Co-writer/Producer	Todd Bridges, Nathaniel Mercereau, Justin Tranter, Austin Jenkins, Joshua Block	Nate Mercereau
"Shy"	2018	Leon Bridges	Good Thing	Co-writer/Producer	Todd Bridges, Nathaniel Mercereau, Daniel Dodd Wilson, Joshua Block	Niles City Sound
"Forgive You"	2018	Leon Bridges	Good Thing	Co-writer/Producer	Todd Bridges, Nathaniel Mercereau, Justin Tranter	Nate Mercereau
"Lions"	2018	Leon Bridges	Good Thing	Co-writer/Producer	Todd Bridges, Zachary Cooper, Victor Dimotsis, Wayne Hector	King Garbage
"If It Feels Good (Then It Must Be)"	2018	Leon Bridges	Good Thing	Co-writer/Producer	Todd Bridges, Nathaniel Mercereau, John Theodore Geiger II, Joshua Block, Austin Jenkins, William Shelby, Dana Meyers	Nate Mercereau
"You Don't Know"	2018	Leon Bridges	Good Thing	Co-writer/Producer	Todd Bridges, Wayne Hector, Austin Jenkins, Joshua Block	Niles City Sound
"Mrs."	2018	Leon Bridges	Good Thing	Co-writer/Producer	Todd Bridges, Zachary Cooper, Justin Tranter, Victor Dimotsis	King Garbage
"Georgia to Texas"	2018	Leon Bridges	Good Thing	Co-writer/Producer	Todd Bridges, Joshua Block, Austin Jenkins	Niles City Sound
"Unless It's With You"	2018	Christina Aguilera	Liberation	Co-writer/Producer	Christina Aguilera, John Theodore Geiger II, Kaj Hassle, Gamal Lewis, Thomas Peyton	–
"Say It"	2019	Maggie Rogers	Heard It in a Past Life	Producer	–	Maggie Rogers, Lucio Westmoreland
"Burning"	2019	Maggie Rogers	Heard It in a Past Life	Co-writer/Producer	Margaret Rogers	Maggie Rogers
"Juice"	2019	Lizzo	Cuz I Love You	Co-writer/Producer	Melissa Jefferson, Theron Thomas	Nate Mercureau
"Crybaby"	2019	Lizzo	Cuz I Love You	Co-writer/Producer	Melissa Jefferson, Theron Thomas, Charles Hinshaw, Nate Mercureau	Nate Mercureau
"Tempo"	2019	Lizzo	Cuz I Love You	Co-writer/Producer	Melissa Jefferson, Theron Thomas, Raymond Scott, Daniel Farber, Antonio Cuna, Melissa Elliott, Tobias Wincorn	Lizzo, Sweater Beats, Dan Farber, Nate Mercureau, Tobias Wincorn
"Lingerie"	2019	Lizzo	Cuz I Love You	Co-writer/Producer	Melissa Jefferson, Theron Thomas, Nate Mercureau	Nate Mercureau
"Should've Said It"	2019	Camila Cabello	Romance	Co-writer/Producer	Camila Cabello, Louis Bell, Adam Feeney, Nate Mercureau, Andrew Wotman, Ali Tamposi	Frank Dukes, Nate Mercureau, Louis Bell
"Don't Go Yet"	2021	Camila Cabello	Familia	Co-writer/Producer	Camila Cabello, Mike Sabath, Scott Harris	Mike Sabath
"Celia"	2022	Camila Cabello	Familia			
"Bam Bam"	2022	Camila Cabello	Familia	Co-producer	–	Jose Castillo, Edgar Barrera
"Man I Am"	2023	Sam Smith	Barbie the Album	Co-producer	–	Mark Ronson
"Nasty"	2024	Tinashe	Quantum Baby	Co-writer/producer	Tinashe Kachingwe	Zack Sekoff
"Love You Less"	2026	Joji	Piss in the Wind	Producer	–	–
