= Turn Up the Love =

Single by Far East Movement featuring Cover Drive

from the album Dirty Bass
- Released: June 21, 2012
- Recorded: 2011
- Genre: East Coast hip hop; dance-pop; pop
- Length: 3:15
- Label: Cherrytree; Interscope
- Songwriters: Andreas Schuller; Eric Frederic; Jae Choung; James Roh; Kevin Nishimura; Virman Coquia; Matthew Bair
- Producers: Axident; Wallpaper.

Far East Movement singles chronology
"Dirty Bass" (2012)	"Turn Up the Love" (2012)	"Change Your Life" (2012)

Cover Drive singles chronology
"Sparks" (2012)	"Turn Up the Love" (2012)	"Explode" (2012)

"Turn Up the Love" is a song by American group Far East Movement from their fourth studio album Dirty Bass. It features vocals from Barbadian group Cover Drive. The song was released on June 21, 2012, as the album's third single. The song was written by Far East Movement, Andreas Schuller, Ricky Reed, Matthew Koma, and produced by Axident and Wallpaper (Ricky Reed).

The song is featured in the game Just Dance 2014.

== Music video ==
A music video to accompany the release of "Turn Up the Love" was first released onto YouTube on June 21, 2012 at a total length of three minutes and thirty-five seconds. Singer Colette Carr makes a cameo.

There is an alternate music video named "Turn Up The Love (Do Something)" released onto YouTube on September 11, 2012 at a total length of three minutes and forty-one seconds.

== Track listing ==
Digital download
No.	Title	Length
1.	"Turn Up the Love" (featuring Cover Drive)	3:16

Digital EP
No.	Title	Length
1.	"Turn Up the Love"	3:16
2.	"Turn Up the Love" (Supasound Radio Edit Remix)	3:24
3.	"Turn Up the Love" (7th Heaven Radio Remix)	3:54

Other Versions

- 7th Heaven Club Mix – 6:33

== Credits and personnel ==
- Lead vocals – Far East Movement and Amanda Reifer of Cover Drive
- Producers – Axident and Wallpaper.
- Writers – A. Schuller, R. Reed, J. Choung, J. Roh, K. Nishimura, V. Coquia, M. Bair
- Label: Cherrytree Records / Interscope Records

== Chart performance ==
=== Weekly charts ===
Chart (2012)	Peak position
Australia (ARIA)	8
Belgium (Ultratip Bubbling Under Flanders)	78
Belgium (Ultratip Bubbling Under Wallonia)	25
Denmark (Tracklisten)	35
Finland (Suomen virallinen lista)	9
France (SNEP)	26
Ireland (IRMA)	14
Netherlands (Dutch Top 40)	12
Netherlands (Single Top 100)	19
New Zealand (Recorded Music NZ)	8
Norway (VG-lista)	20
Poland (Top 5 Video Airplay)	1
Russia Airplay (TopHit)	12
Scotland Singles (OCC)	10
Sweden (Sverigetopplistan)	23
Switzerland (Schweizer Hitparade)	55
UK Singles (OCC)	13
UK Dance (OCC)	2

=== Year-end charts ===
Chart (2012)	Position
Australia (ARIA)	65
France (SNEP)	133
Netherlands (Dutch Top 40)	54
Netherlands (Single Top 100)	73
Russia Airplay (TopHit)	73
UK Singles (Official Charts Company)	165

2013 year-end chart performance for "Turn Up the Love"
Chart (2013)	Position
Russia Airplay (TopHit)	92

== Certifications ==
Region	Certification	Certified units/sales
Australia (ARIA)	2× Platinum	140,000^{^}
New Zealand (RMNZ)	Gold	7,500^{*}
United Kingdom (BPI)	Silver	200,000^{‡}
Streaming
Denmark (IFPI Danmark)	Gold	900,000^{†}
^{*} Sales figures based on certification alone.^{^} Shipments figures based on certification alone.^{‡} Sales+streaming figures based on certification alone.^{†} Streaming-only figures based on certification alone.

== Release history ==
Region	Date	Format	Label
United Kingdom	July 29, 2012	Digital EP	Interscope Records
