= Axident =

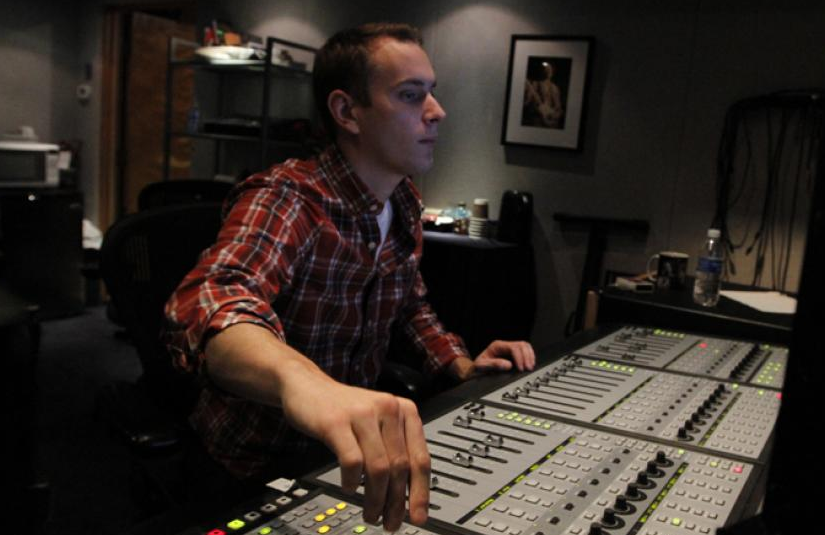
- Axident with a mixing console

Background information
- Born: Andreas Schuller; 1985 (age 40–41); Drøbak, Norway
- Origin: Los Angeles, California
- Genres: Pop
- Occupations: Producer, songwriter

Andreas Schuller (known by his producer name Axident) is a Norwegian songwriter and music producer based in Los Angeles. He has worked with artists Justin Bieber, Pitbull, Inna, Jason Derulo, Snoop Dogg, Jessie J, Adam Lambert, Timeflies, Jake Miller, Travis Mills, Riff Raff and Far East Movement. "Wiggle" by Jason Derulo and Snoop Dogg was co-written and produced by Axident, and is his most successful single to date, reaching #3 on the Billboard Hot 100. Other popular songs which were co-written and co-produced by Axident include "Fireball" by Pitbull and "Company" by Justin Bieber.

== Early life and education ==
Axident was born in Drøbak, Norway. He picked up the drums at an early age and discovered programming in his teens. He started a band called Albino Superstars whose first single, "Team Disco" got some attention. In the mid-2000s, he began to focus on the study of music. He attended and graduated from the Paul McCartney Liverpool Institute for Performing Arts.

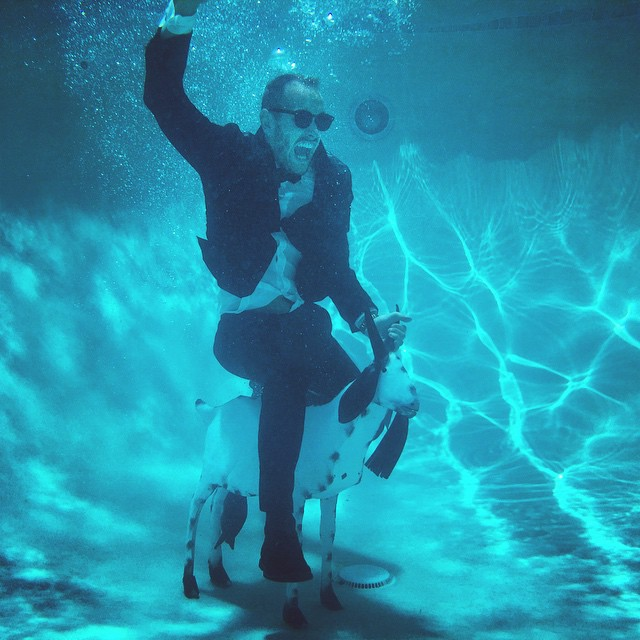

== Career ==
Axident began recording and producing songs for the Norwegian graduation celebrations, known as Russerfering or bus songs. He began commissioning theme songs for the colorfully decorated touring buses of Norwegian graduates, creating this EDM niche. Axident became the go-to producer for who had the best graduation song. Bus songs have become a training ground for many young Norwegian producers since. Andreas took the name Axident because he says that the best moments in music happen by accident and believes that great music comes from letting go of boundaries. Axident moved to the United States in 2010 to pursue his music career. He stayed with a friend in Nashville, Tennessee who had a connection to Ron Moss of Universal Music Group. After providing Moss with a few recordings that he had done, Axident moved to Los Angeles. Axident was signed to Rondor Music/Universal Music Publishing Group in 2010. While recording, he used to keep the door to the studio open so that others could hear the music. One night he was visited in the studio by Tricky Stewart who was recording music for American Idol down the hallway from where Axident was recording. After meeting Stewart, Axident signed a production deal with Trickey Stewart's RedZone Entertainment and began writing and recording songs for artists such as Semi Precious Weapons, Wallpaper and Far East Movement. His song "Turn Up the Love", recorded by Far East Movement, became a top 10 song in 10 different countries. Axident founded the Honua Music LLC publishing company in 2011 along with Ron Moss to sign and mentor other writers. Honua Music LLC publishes James (Gladius) Wong under a hybrid deal with Pulse Recordings, and Leroy (Big Taste) Clampitt is signed directly to Honua Music. In 2012, Axident moved on from Rondor Music/Universal Music Publishing Group to sign a hybrid deal between Honua Music and Artist Publishing group (APG) where he worked with Mike Caren and his team.

== Discography ==
As Andreas Schuller

- Russ Dekknavn 2014 (EP) (vs. Gladius)
- Russ Konsept 2014 (EP) (with Gladius and Crux)
- "Wisteria Lane" 2014 (single) (featuring Gladius)
- "Sexto Sentido" 2015 (single) (featuring StopWaitGo and Klara Elias)
- Konsept 2015 (EP) (with Gladius and Ka No)

Songwriting and producing credits

Year	Title	Artist	Role	Notes
2016	"Heaven"	Inna	Writer	
2015	"The View"	Tim McGraw	Writer, producer	
2015	"Woohoo"	Eli "Paperboy" Reed	Writer, producer	
2015	"You N Me N Everyone We Know" "Life of the Party" "Let's Get Away with It"	Wallpaper	Writer, producer	
2015	"Lion Heart"	Jake Miller	Writer, producer	
2015	"Clap Snap"	Icona Pop	Writer, producer	
2015	"Undress Rehearsal"	Timeflies	Writer, producer	Island Records – Released September 18, 2015
2015	"Bamborrea" "Too Sexy" "Rendez Vous" "Body and the Sun" "Salina Skies"	Inna	Writer, producer	Roton Records – Released November 2015. "Rendez Vous" certified gold in Poland.
2015	"Company"	Justin Bieber	Writer, producer	"Company" entered the Billboard Hot 100 on December 14, 2015.
2015	"Day Trippin'" feat. Estelle	Kaskade	Writer, producer	
2015	"We Wanna"	Alexandra Stan & Inna feat. Daddy Yankee	Writer, producer	
2015	"Daisy"	Zedd	Writer	
2015	"Headlights" feat. Ilsey	Robin Schulz	Writer	
2014	"Burnin' Up"	Jessie J	Writer, producer	
2014	"Fireball"	Pitbull	Writer, producer	Most successful co-written single to date, peaking at number 23 in the US Billboard Hot 100 chart. Also reached the top 10 in six other countries while being certified gold in Australia and platinum in Canada.
2014	"Good Time" feat. Pitbull	Inna	Writer, producer	
2014	"Wiggle"	Jason Derulo	Writer	Peaked at #3 on the Australian Charts - “Wiggle” is Axident's most successful single to date reaching #3 on the Billboard Hot 100.
2014	"Cola Song"	Inna	Writer, producer	First U.S. major label release for Inna. Certified Platinum in Spain.
2013	"The Illest"	Far East Movement	Writer, producer	Peaked at #7 on Billboard's Bubbling Under Hot 100 Singles
2013	"I Choose You"	Timeflies	Writer, producer	Peaked at #6 on the Hot Dance Club Songs chart.
2013	"Love to My Cobain"	Jeffree Star	Writer	
2012	"Turn Up the Love"	Far East Movement	Writer, producer	Certified 2× platinum in Australia and gold in New Zealand.
2011	"Fucking Best Song Everrr"	Wallpaper	Writer, producer	
2010	"Aviation High"	Semi Precious Weapons	Writer, producer	Named "Brink of Fame Song" at the 2008 NewNowNext Awards.

== See also ==
- List of Norwegian Americans
- List of Universal Music Group artists
