= Dirty Bass =

Studio album by Far East Movement
- Released: May 21, 2012
- Recorded: 2011–2012
- Genres: Hip hop; pop; house; dance
- Length: 44:08
- Labels: Cherrytree; Interscope
- Producers: Stereotypes; Ra Charm; RedOne; De Paris; Axident; Wallpaper.; Sidney Samson; Leroy Styles; Dallas Austin; Cory Nitta; Cherry Cherry Boom Boom; Redfoo; Alvaro; Orpheo Popken; Bangladesh; Junior Caldera; Julien Carret; Bingo Players

Far East Movement chronology
Free Wired (2010)	Dirty Bass (2012)	Ktown Riot (2014)

Singles from Dirty Bass
- 1. "Live My Life" Released: February 28, 2012; 2. "Lights Out (Go Crazy)" Released: March 13, 2012; 3. "Dirty Bass" Released: May 10, 2012; 4. "Turn Up the Love" Released: June 21, 2012; 5. "Change Your Life" Released: November 20, 2012; 6. "Get Up (Rattle)" Released: December 11, 2012; 7. "The Illest" Released: July 2, 2013

Dirty Bass is the fourth studio album by American hip hop group Far East Movement, released through Cherrytree Records and Interscope Records (Universal Music Group) on June 12, 2012. Despite having two top 40 hit singles, the album received mixed success worldwide.

The songs "Like a G6" and "Rocketeer" from their 2010 album Free Wired were included on international versions of Dirty Bass.

== Singles ==
- "Live My Life" was released as the album's lead single on February 28, 2012. It features Justin Bieber. The song peaked to #21 in the United States, #7 in the United Kingdom, and #4 in Canada.
- "Lights Out (Go Crazy)" digitally as a single was released on March 13, 2012 through Roxbury SARL under exclusive license to Interscope Records. It is a collaboration with French producer, DJ and remixer Junior Caldera and English singer-songwriter Natalia Kills. It was included on the deluxe edition of Dirty Bass.
- "Dirty Bass" was released as the album's second single on May 10, 2012. It features Young Money rapper Tyga. Uncredited additional vocals in the chorus were provided by Kayla Kayla.
- "Turn Up the Love" was released as the album's third single on June 21, 2012. It features Cover Drive. It has so far peaked #8 in New Zealand, #8 in Australia, #12 in the Netherlands, #13 in the UK, and #14 in Ireland.
- "Change Your Life" was released as the album's fourth single on November 20, 2012. It features DJ and producer Sidney Samson and rapper Flo Rida. It was included on the re-release of Dirty Bass.
- "Get Up (Rattle)" was released as a single on December 11, 2012 through Ministry of Sound. It is a vocal version of the Bingo Players song "Rattle".
- "The Illest" was released digitally as a single on July 2, 2013, and included on the Special Edition of Dirty Bass. It features Mad Decent artist Riff Raff.

=== Promotional singles ===
- "Ain't Coming Down" was released on May 12, 2012 as a radio single from the album. The radio version features actress Susannah Wetzel (who was uncredited) in place of Matthew Koma and was slightly different from the album's version. It had achieved strong airplay mostly in Aruba, Bahamas, Belize, Honduras, Jamaica, Panama, Saint Lucia and Trinidad and Tobago.
- "Little Bird" was released on October 17, 2012 as the first promotional single from the album. A video for the song was published to YouTube through the group's Vevo channel on the same day. Produced by label executive Martin Kierszenbaum (a.k.a. Cherry Cherry Boom Boom), it features a sample of Canadian singer and songwriter Feist's "Caught a Long Wind", from her 2011 album Metals.
- "For All" was released on October 25, 2012 as the second promotional single from the album. The main theme of the song, as well as its music video, was inspired by the "Hope Is for All" (Forward) campaign, a part of President Barack Obama's re-election campaign in 2012.
- "Lovetron" was released on April 19, 2013 as the third promotional single from the album. It features American recording artist and former NLT member Travis Garland. A live acoustic performance of the song was posted to YouTube through Vevo on April 24.

=== Other notable songs ===
- The track "Candy", featuring Pitbull, was originally featured on the original motion picture soundtrack of the 2012 film Project X (via Cherrytree Records / Interscope Records).
- The international deluxe edition includes the track "Monsuno", which is the theme song from the animated series of the same name.
- The track "Lovetron" serves as a deluxe edition bonus track to the album and features Travis Garland of NLT.

== Track listings ==
All songs written and composed by Jae Choung, James Roh, Kevin Nishimura and Virman Coquia. Additional writers noted below.

Standard edition
No.	Title	Writer(s)	Producer(s)	Length
1.	"Dirty Bass" (featuring Tyga)	Jonathan Yip; Jeremy Reeves; Ray Romulus; Nathan Lawrence Walker; Michael Stevenson	Stereotypes	3:29
2.	"Live My Life" (featuring Justin Bieber)	Nadir Khayat; John Mamann; Jean Claude Sindres; Yohanne Simon; Bilal "The Chef" Hajji; Walker; Bieber	RedOne; De Paris; Kuk Harrell (vocal)	3:57
3.	"Where the Wild Things Are" (featuring Crystal Kay)	Yip, Reeves; Romulus; Ray Charles McCullough; Walker	Stereotypes; Ra Charm (co.)	3:42
4.	"Turn Up the Love" (featuring Cover Drive)	Andreas Schuller; Eric Burton Frederic; M. Baier	Axident; Wallpaper.	3:16
5.	"Flossy" (featuring My Name Is Kay)	Yip; Reeves; Romulus; McCullough; Walker	Stereotypes; Ra Charm (co.)	3:33
6.	"If I Die Tomorrow" (featuring Bill Kaulitz of Tokio Hotel)	Yip; Reeves; Romulus; McCullough; Mike Hamilton; Walker	Stereotypes; Ra Charm (co.); David Jost (vocal); David Roth (vocal); Pat Benzner (vocal); Bill Kaulitz (vocal)	4:07
7.	"Ain't Coming Down" (featuring Sidney Samson and Matthew Koma)	Samson; Leeroy Jones; Walker	Samson; Leroy Styles (co.)	3:34
8.	"Candy" (featuring Pitbull)	Yip; Reeves; Romulus; Dwight Watson; Howard Coney; Hamilton; Armando Perez	Stereotypes	3:58
9.	"Fly with U" (featuring Cassie)	Dallas Austin; Cory Nitta; Walker; L. Di Agostino; C. Montagner; P. Sandrini; D. Leoni	Austin; Nitta	3:31
10.	"Change Your Life" (featuring Sidney Samson and Flo Rida)	Samson; Walker; Tramar Dillard; Breyan Isaac; Antonio Mobley; I. Devaney; A. Morris; L. Stansfield	Samson	3:39
11.	"Little Bird"	Leslie Feist; Martin Kierszenbaum; Jason Charles Beck; Dominic Salole	Martin "Cherry Cherry Boom Boom" Kierszenbaum	3:08
12.	"Live My Life" (Party Rock Remix) (featuring Justin Bieber and Redfoo)	Khayat; Mamann; Sindres; Simon; Hajji; Walker; Bieber; Stefan Kendal Gordy; M. Kierszenbaum	RedOne; De Paris; Harrell (vocal); Redfoo (remix)	4:14
Total length:				44:08

Deluxe edition
No.	Title	Writer(s)	Producer(s)	Length
13.	"Show Me Love" (featuring Alvaro)	Jasper Helderman; Orpheo Popken; Walker	Alvaro; Popken	3:51
14.	"Basshead" (featuring YG)	Shondrae Crawford; Keenon Jackson	Bangladesh	3:48
15.	"Shake Ya Rump"	Walker; Yip; Reeves; Romulus	Stereotypes	3:21
16.	"Lights Out (Go Crazy)" (with Junior Caldera and Natalia Kills)	Jérôme Dumas; Julien Carret; Natalia Sinclair	Junior Caldera; Carret	3:10
Total length:				58:18

=== International edition ===
No.	Title	Writer(s)	Producer(s)	Length
1.	"Dirty Bass" (featuring Tyga)	Jonathan Yip; Jeremy Reeves; Ray Romulus; Nathan Lawrence Walker; Michael Stevenson	Stereotypes	3:29
2.	"Live My Life" (featuring Justin Bieber)	Nadir Khayat; John Mamann; Jean Claude Sindres; Yohanne Simon; Bilal "The Chef" Hajji; Walker; Bieber	RedOne; De Paris; Kuk Harrell (vocal)	3:57
3.	"Where the Wild Things Are" (featuring Crystal Kay)	Yip; Reeves; Romulus; Ray Charles McCullough; Walker	Stereotypes; Ra Charm (co.)	3:42
4.	"Turn Up the Love" (featuring Cover Drive)	Andreas Schuller; Eric Burton Frederic; M. Baier	Axident; Wallpaper.	3:15
5.	"Flossy" (featuring My Name Is Kay)	Yip; Reeves; Romulus; McCullough; Walker	Stereotypes; Ra Charm (co.)	3:33
6.	"If I Die Tomorrow" (featuring Bill Kaulitz of Tokio Hotel)	Yip; Reeves; Romulus; McCullough; Mike Hamilton; Walker	Stereotypes; Ra Charm (co.); David Jost (vocal); David Roth (vocal); Pat Benzner (vocal); Bill Kaulitz (vocal)	4:07
7.	"Ain't Coming Down" (featuring Sidney Samson and Matthew Koma)	Samson; Leeroy Jones; Walker	Samson; Leroy Styles (co.)	3:34
8.	"Candy" (featuring Pitbull)	Yip; Reeves; Romulus; Dwight Watson; Howard Coney; Hamilton; Armando Perez	Stereotypes	3:58
9.	"Fly with U" (featuring Cassie)	Dallas Austin; Cory Nitta; Walker; L. Di Agostino; C. Montagner; P. Sandrini; D. Leoni	Austin; Nitta	3:30
10.	"Show Me Love" (featuring Alvaro)	Jasper Helderman; Orpheo Popken; Walker	Alvaro; Popken	3:51
11.	"Live My Life" (Party Rock Remix) (featuring Justin Bieber and Redfoo)	Khayat; Mamann; Sindres; Simon; Hajji; Walker; Bieber; Stefan Kendal Gordy; Martin Kierszenbaum	RedOne; De Paris; Harrell (vocal); Redfoo (remix)	4:16
12.	"Little Bird"	Leslie Feist; M. Kierszenbaum; Jason Charles Beck; Dominic Salole	Martin "Cherry Cherry Boom Boom" Kierszenbaum	3:07
13.	"Basshead" (featuring YG)	Shondrae Crawford; Keenon Jackson	Bangladesh	3:48
14.	"Lights Out (Go Crazy)" (with Junior Caldera and Natalia Kills)	Jérôme Dumas; Julien Carret; Natalia Sinclair	Junior Caldera; Carret	3:10
15.	"Like a G6" (featuring The Cataracs and Dev)	David Singer; Niles Dhar	The Cataracs	3:39
16.	"Rocketeer" (featuring Ryan Tedder of OneRepublic)	Yip, Reeves; Romulus; Bruno Mars; Philip Lawrence	Stereotypes; The Smeezingtons	3:31
Total length:				58:27

iTunes bonus track
No.	Title	Writer(s)	Producer(s)	Length
17.	"Live My Life" (Jaywalker Remix) (featuring Justin Bieber)	Khayat; Mamann; Sindres; Simon; Hajji; Walker; Bieber	RedOne; De Paris; Harrell (vocal); Jaywalker (remix)	5:16
Total length:				63:43

Japanese edition bonus track
No.	Title	Writer(s)	Producer(s)	Length
17.	"Live My Life" (Sick Individuals Remix) (featuring Justin Bieber)	Khayat; Mamann; Sindres; Simon; Hajji; Walker; Bieber	RedOne; De Paris; Harrell (vocal); Sick Individuals (remix)	6:35
Total length:				65:02

Deluxe edition bonus tracks
No.	Title	Writer(s)	Producer(s)	Length
17.	"Change Your Life" (featuring Sidney Samson and Flo Rida)	Samson; Walker; Tramar Dillard; Breyan Isaac; Antonio Mobley; I. Devaney; A. Morris; L. Stansfield	Samson	3:38
18.	"Lovetron" (featuring Travis Garland)	Yip; Reeves; Romulus; Garland, Andrew Kierszenbaum	Stereotypes	3:35
19.	"For All"	Yip; Reeves; Romulus; McCullough	Stereotypes; Ra Charm (co.)	3:42
20.	"Monsuno" (Animated Series Theme Song)	M. Kierszenbaum	Martin "Cherry Cherry Boom Boom" Kierszenbaum	3:01
21.	"Turn Up the Love" (R3hab Remix) (featuring Cover Drive)	Schuller; Frederic; M. Baier	Axident; Wallpaper.; R3hab (remix)	4:47
22.	"Get Up (Rattle)" (with Bingo Players)	Paul Bäumer; Maarten Hoogstraten; Koen Groeneveld; Addy van der Zwan; Hugo Langras; Dipesh Parmar	Bäumer; Hoogstraten	5:02
Total length:				82:10

=== Special edition ===
No.	Title	Writer(s)	Producer(s)	Length
1.	"Dirty Bass" (featuring Tyga)	Yip; Reeves; Romulus; Walker; Stevenson	Stereotypes	3:29
2.	"Live My Life" (featuring Justin Bieber)	Khayat; Mamann; Sindres; Simon; Hajji; Walker; Bieber	RedOne; De Paris; Harrell (vocal)	3:57
3.	"Turn Up the Love" (featuring Cover Drive)	Schuller; Frederic; M. Baier	Axident; Wallpaper.	3:16
4.	"Little Bird"	Feist; M. Kierszenbaum; Beck; Salole	Martin "Cherry Cherry Boom Boom" Kierszenbaum	3:07
5.	"Get Up (Rattle)" (with Bingo Players)	Bäumer; Hoogstraten; Groeneveld; van der Zwan; Langras; Parmar	Bäumer; Hoogstraten	5:01
6.	"Change Your Life" (featuring Sidney Samson and Flo Rida)	Samson; Walker; Dillard; Isaac; Mobley; Devaney; Morris; Stansfield	Samson	3:37
7.	"Like a G6" (featuring The Cataracs and Dev)	Singer; Dhar	The Cataracs	3:38
8.	"Rocketeer" (featuring Ryan Tedder of OneRepublic)	Yip; Reeves; Romulus; Mars; Lawrence	Stereotypes; The Smeezingtons	3:31
9.	"The Illest" (featuring Riff Raff)	Schuller; Frederic; J. Christian	Axident; Wallpaper.	3:39
Total length:				33:15

Sample credits

- "Fly with U" contains elements of "L'Amour Toujours", as composed by Gigi D'Agostino, Carlos Montagner, Paolo Sandrini, Diego Leoni
- "Change Your Life" contains elements of "All Around the World", as composed by Ian Devaney, Andy Morris, Lisa Stansfield
- "Little Bird" incorporates a sample from "Caught a Long Wind" by Feist

== Chart performance ==
Chart (2012)	Peak position
Australian Albums Chart	37
Belgian Albums Chart (Flanders)	186
Belgian Albums Chart (Wallonia)	186
Canadian Albums Chart	25
German Albums Chart	95
Japanese Albums Chart	16
New Zealand Albums Chart	23
Swiss Albums Chart	78
US Billboard 200	190
US Top Dance/Electronic Albums	7

== Release history ==
Country	Release date	Format	Label
United Kingdom	May 21, 2012	CD, digital download	Cherrytree, Interscope
Japan	May 30, 2012	CD, digital download	Delicious Deli, UMG
United States	June 12, 2012	CD, digital download	Cherrytree, Interscope
