= Albino Superstars =

Norwegian band

Albinosuperstars
- Origin: Drøbak, Akershus, Norway
- Genres: Pop; Disco
- Years active: 2004 — present
- Label: MTG
- Members: Fridtjof Støre; Andreas Schüller; Espen Riis Jahren (former)
- Website: albinosuperstars.com

Albino Superstars is a small Norwegian band consisting of 2 members; Fridtjof Støre (vocal), Andreas Schüller (songwriter) and Espen Riis Jahren (musician). Støre and Schüller were childhood friends from the small town of Drøbak, outside Oslo who started working together in 2004. Jahren joined the band circa 2009 and left circa 2010.

The first song "Popular" became a local hit. And by the end of the 2005 summer they had produced a music video to the song with the Norwegian producer Jørgen Johannesen.

In the original video, neither Støre or Schüller wanted to be on-screen, so the part of "the popular guy" which the song is about is being played by Andrè Anker-Hansen Rønbeck. They did however had a small part where they appeared as workers in the mansion where the movie was recorded. Ultimately, the producers insisted that they had a part in the video, so they became a part of the final cut. Making the whole movie as the lead character's dream instead.

As they are not able to live off the music, Støre works as a pump-mechanic in Oslo, while Schüller is attending the Paul McCartney funded school LIPA where he has 2 remaining years as a student.

== Discography ==
- Popular
- Various - McMusic 40 (CD, Comp)
- McMusic ANS 2007
- Team Disco
- Various - Fierce Disco III (3xCD, Comp)
- Fierce Angel Records 2009

== Music ==
Starting with "Popular" which became a popular tune for young people, Albino Superstars quickly became popular with the Norwegian Russ and in 2005, 2006, and 2007 they created songs for tour buses which the Russ used when they travel around in Norway. They held their first live concert in Oslo on 12 May 2007 for about 2000 Russ.

The first official release of "Popular" on 16 May 2007 became the number 1 sold single in Norway the first 2 weeks on the market. Holding a 16th place on the Norwegian Top 20, known as VG-lista. Their next single, "My Girls" was released in October 2007, and went to sixth place the first week on VG-lista. The music video was controverial as it featured topless and almost naked women. 13,000 people watched the video on MySpace the first day of the launch after an interview in Norway's biggest newspaper, Verdens Gang.

== In popular culture ==
Their song "Popular" was referenced in Brad Thor's book called Edge of Honor.
