= Fireball (Pitbull song) =

2014 song by Pitbull

Single by Pitbull featuring John Ryan

from the album Globalization
- Released: July 23, 2014
- Recorded: 2014
- Length: 3:56
- Label: RCA; Sony Music
- Songwriters: Armando C. Perez; John Ryan; Andreas Schuller; Eric Frederic; Joe Spargur; Tom Peyton; Ilsey Juber
- Producers: Ricky Reed; Axident; John Ryan; Joe London

Pitbull singles chronology
"Good Time" (2014)	"Fireball" (2014)	"Booty" (2014)

Music video
- "Fireball" on YouTube

"Fireball" is a song by American rapper Pitbull, featuring vocals from American singer John Ryan. It was released on July 23, 2014 as the second release from Pitbull's eighth studio album, Globalization (2014).

== Music video ==
According to Variety, the music video for the song includes a "digital mashup" with internet stars Jenna Marbles (who has a large following on her YouTube comedy channel and hosts the YouTube 15 weekly program on SiriusXM, who had previously made a parody impression video of Pitbull), Bart Baker (creator behind popular music parodies, including one of Pitbull), and Brittany Furlan (the most followed female video star on Vine before Vine shut down). All three appear in the "Fireball" official video. Pitbull's collaboration with Marbles, Baker, and Furlan was brokered by Endemol Beyond USA.

Story

The video begins with Pitbull leaving a car and entering a club. The video shows people dancing in black and white, and people firebreathing, along with Marbles and Baker dancing by Pitbull. Pitbull sees a woman (Alejandra Espinoza) coming down stairs and, when she enters the main room, the video turns to color. The woman looks very much like Jessica Rabbit. Many men (usually with women) stare at her. She walks over to Pitbull; they go to a dressing room and come closer to one another. The video then ends with Pitbull and the girl leaving the club in his car.

== Chart performance ==
The song peaked at number 23 at the US Billboard Hot 100. As of January 2015, the single has sold one million copies in the US. On October 16, 2020, the single was certified triple platinum by the Recording Industry Association of America (RIAA) for combined sales and streaming equivalent units of over three million units in the United States. It was also certified Gold in Canada and Australia.

== In popular culture ==
The song was featured in the trailer and TV spots of Aardman Animations' Shaun the Sheep Movie. It was also featured in television spots for Walt Disney Animation Studios' Zootopia and in the Sony Pictures Animation films The Emoji Movie and The Angry Birds Movie 2.

- The song was used for the opening number of Miss Earth 2014.
- From 2015 to 2016, the song played every time a Colorado Rockies player hits a home run at Coors Field.
- The song was featured in the pilot episode of The Catch.
- It was also briefly heard in the Blue Sky Studios film Ice Age: Collision Course.
- The song was used for the opening number of Miss Universe 2020.
- This song has been played when the Chicago White Sox hit a home run.
- The song was adopted by Celtic FC fans, with the lyrics "Josip Juranovic, Josip Juranovic".
- The song features a prominent Sample from the pinball machine "Fireball (1972)"

== Charts ==
=== Weekly charts ===
Chart (2014–16)	Peak position
Australia (ARIA)	26
Austria (Ö3 Austria Top 40)	12
Belgium (Ultratop 50 Flanders)	5
Belgium (Ultratop 50 Wallonia)	11
Canada Hot 100 (Billboard)	16
Canada CHR/Top 40 (Billboard)	33
Chile (Top 20 Chart)	5
Colombia (National-Report)	20
Czech Republic Singles Digital (ČNS IFPI)	23
Europe (Billboard Euro Digital Songs)	8
Finland (Suomen virallinen lista)	9
France (SNEP)	114
Germany (GfK)	22
Hungary (Dance Top 40)	19
Hungary (Single Top 40)	6
Hungary (Stream Top 40)	27
Ireland (IRMA)	66
Lebanon (The Official Lebanese Top 20)	12
Luxembourg Digital Song Sales (Billboard)	7
Mexico Anglo (Monitor Latino)	2
Netherlands (Dutch Top 40)	1
Netherlands (Single Top 100)	1
Poland Airplay (ZPAV)	15
Poland Dance (ZPAV)	2
Poland (Polish Airplay New)	5
Romania Airplay (Media Forest)	3
Romania TV Airplay (Media Forest)	4
Scottish Singles Sales (Official Charts)	23
Slovakia Singles Digital (ČNS IFPI)	18
Slovenia Airplay (SloTop50)	8
South Africa Airplay (EMA)	9
Spain (Promusicae)	6
Sweden (Sverigetopplistan)	47
Switzerland (Schweizer Hitparade)	51
UK Singles (Official Charts)	49
US Billboard Hot 100	23
US Hot Rap Songs (Billboard)	4
US Dance Club Songs (Billboard)	35
US Latin Airplay (Billboard)	14
US Pop Airplay (Billboard)	17
US Rhythmic Airplay (Billboard)	31

2026 weekly chart performance for "Fireball"
Chart (2026)	Peak position
Latvia Streaming (LaIPA)	13
Lithuania (AGATA)	18

=== Year-end charts ===
Chart (2014)	Position
Belgium (Ultratop Flanders)	60
Canada (Canadian Hot 100)	74
Netherlands (Dutch Top 40)	20
Netherlands (Single Top 100)	10

Chart (2015)	Position
Hungary (Dance Top 40)	63
Spain (PROMUSICAE)	93
Slovenia (SloTop50)	50

== Certifications ==
Region	Certification	Certified units/sales
Australia (ARIA)	Platinum	70,000^{‡}
Canada (Music Canada)	Platinum	80,000^{*}
Denmark (IFPI Danmark)	Platinum	90,000^{‡}
Germany (BVMI)	Gold	200,000^{‡}
Italy (FIMI)	Platinum	50,000^{‡}
Mexico (AMPROFON)	Platinum	60,000^{*}
New Zealand (RMNZ)	2× Platinum	60,000^{‡}
Spain (Promusicae)	Platinum	40,000^{‡}
United Kingdom (BPI)	Platinum	600,000^{‡}
United States (RIAA)	5× Platinum	5,000,000^{‡}
Streaming
Spain (Promusicae)	Gold	4,000,000^{†}
^{*} Sales figures based on certification alone.^{‡} Sales+streaming figures based on certification alone.^{†} Streaming-only figures based on certification alone.

== Release history ==
Release dates and formats for "Fireball"
Region	Date	Format	Label(s)	Ref.
United States	August 5, 2014	Mainstream airplay	RCA	
