= Change Your Life (Far East Movement song) =

Single by Far East Movement featuring Flo Rida and Sidney Samson

from the album Dirty Bass
- Released: October 26, 2012
- Recorded: 2011–12
- Genre: Electro house; dance-pop
- Length: 3:38
- Label: Interscope Records
- Songwriter(s): Lisa Stansfield; Ian Devaney; Andy Morris; Tramar Dillard; Sidney Samson; Nathan Walker; James Roh; Kevin Nishimura; Virman Coquia; Jae Choung; Breyan Isaac; Antonio Mobley
- Producer(s): Sidney Samson

Far East Movement singles chronology
| "Turn Up the Love" (2012) | "Change Your Life" (2012) | "Get Up (Rattle)" (2012) |

Flo Rida singles chronology
| "Troublemaker" (2012) | "Change Your Life" (2012) | "Say You're Just a Friend" (2012) |

Sidney Samson singles chronology
| "Mutate" (2011) | "Change Your Life" (2012) | "Better Than Yesterday" (2012) |

"Change Your Life" is a song by American group Far East Movement from their fourth studio album Dirty Bass. It features American rapper and singer-songwriter Flo Rida and Dutch DJ Sidney Samson. The song was released in Belgium on October 26, 2012 as the album's fourth single. The song was written by Far East Movement, Flo Rida, Sidney Samson, Nathan Walker, Breyan Isaac, Antonio Mobley, and produced by Sidney Samson. Flo Rida's verse borrows lyrics from the 1989 Lisa Stansfield hit "All Around the World", which was written by Stansfield and producers Ian Devaney and Andy Morris. It peaked at number 91 in Germany.

== Music video ==
A music video to accompany the release of "Change Your Life" was first released on YouTube on November 20, 2012.

== Track listing ==
Digital download
| No. | Title | Length |
|---|---|---|
| 1. | "Change Your Life" (featuring Flo Rida and Sidney Samson) | 3:38 |

== Credits and personnel ==
- Lead vocals – Far East Movement and Flo Rida
- Producer – Sidney Samson
- Music – Sidney Samson
- Lyrics – Jae Choung, James Roh, Kevin Nishimura, Virman Coquia, Nathan Walker, Tramar Dillard, Breyan Isaac, Antonio Clarence Mobley
- Writers (sampled) – Lisa Stansfield, Ian Devaney, Andy Morris
- Label: Interscope Records

== Chart performance ==
| Chart (2012) | Peak position |
|---|---|
| Australia (ARIA) | 60 |
| Germany (GfK) | 91 |
| Slovakia (Rádio Top 100) | 36 |

== Release history ==
| Region | Date | Format | Label |
|---|---|---|---|
| Belgium | October 26, 2012 | Digital download | Interscope Records |
