= Sidney Samson =

Dutch DJ (born 1981)

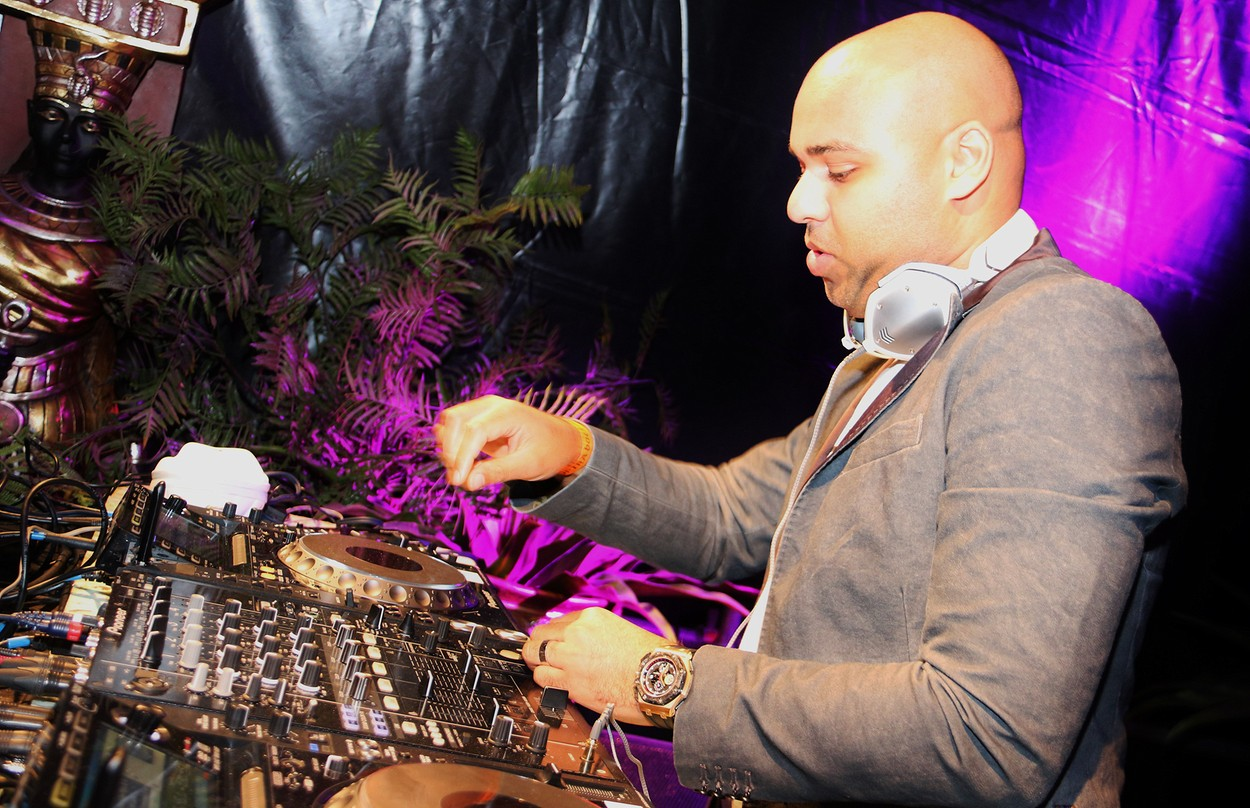
- Samson in 2013

Background information
- Born: Sidney Samson; 2 October 1981 (age 44); Amsterdam, Netherlands
- Genres: Electro house; Dutch house; progressive house; trap; moombahton
- Occupation: DJ
- Instruments: Keyboards, turntables, computer
- Years active: 1999–present
- Labels: Spinnin' Records, Ultra Records, Artificial Recordings
- Website: http://www.sidneysamson.com/

Sidney V. Samson (born 2 October 1981) is a Dutch DJ and music producer. He is best known for his track "Riverside", which was released in 2009.

== Career ==
Samson started DJing at the age of 13, focusing on hip hop music before working seriously on house music from 1999. He is a resident DJ at The Matrixx, a major Dutch nightclub and released "Bring That Beat Back" and "It’s All Funked Up" on the digidance and Spinnin' Records labels respectively. After collaborating with Gregor Salto, he formed his own record label, Samsobeats, in 2007.

Samson managed to get his debut single "Riverside" to #1 on the Dutch Top 40, #9 on the Australian ARIA Charts, #2 on the Irish Singles Chart, and #2 on the UK Singles Chart.

He released his second single "Shut Up and Let It Go" with Lady Bee in February 2010.

In 2011, Sidney Samson collaborated with the UK singer/songwriter Tara McDonald releasing "Set Me On Fire" through Spinnin Records, followed by "Dynamite" which was released through his own label Rock the Houze with Spinnin Records remixed by Nicky Romero.

Samson frequently collaborates with top industry influencers and has worked on hit tracks, including "Get Outta My Way" by Kylie Minogue, "Gettin' Over You" by David Guetta, "Commander" by Kelly Rowland, "Hello" by Martin Solveig and "Hip Hop" by dead Prez. After touring with LMFAO last summer, Sidney is back in the studio, working hard to put out new tracks for his fans. His recent hits include "Change Your Life" with Far East Movement and Flo Rida, and "Better than Yesterday" with will.i.am. He is also playing at shows around the US, including his huge residency at The Wynn clubs in Las Vegas.

== Discography ==
=== Singles ===
==== As lead artist ====
List of singles as lead artist, with selected chart positions, showing year released and album name
Title	Year	Peak chart positions						Certifications
Title	Year	NLD	AUS	AUT	BEL	UK	FRA	Certifications
"Nobody Rock!"	2006	62	—	—	—	—	—	
"What Do You Want Papi" (with Gregor Salto)	2007	33	—	—	—	—	—	
"You Don't Love Me (No, No, No)" (with Skitzofrenix)	2008	32	—	—	—	—	—	
"Pump Up the Stereo" (featuring MC Stretch)	2008	68	—	—	—	—	—	
"Today" (featuring Joni)	2008	49	—	—	—	—	—	
"Riverside"	2009	8	10	50	13	—	—	ARIA: Gold
"Let's Go" (featuring Lady Bee and Bizzey)	2009	—	48	—	—	—	—	
"Riverside (Let's Go)" (featuring Wizard Sleeve)	2010	—	—	—	—	2	—	BPI: Gold
"Shut Up & Let It Go" (featuring Lady Bee)	2010	75	—	—	—	—	—	
"The World Is Yours"	2010	—	—	—	—	—	—	
"Fill U Up" (featuring Sicerow)	2010	49	—	—	—	—	—	
"Wake Up Call" (featuring Steve Aoki)	2010	—	—	—	—	—	—	
"Duplex"	2010	—	—	—	—	—	—	
"Quacky" (featuring Afrojack)	2010	—	—	—	—	—	—	
"Mutate" (with Lil Jon)	2011	—	—	—	130	—	—	
"Tomahawk"	2011	—	—	—	—	—	—	
"Surrender" (featuring MC Ambush)	2011	—	—	—	—	—	—	
"Thanks I Get"	2011	—	—	—	—	—	—	
"The Street Is Ours"	2011	—	—	—	—	—	—	
"Mutate" (featuring Lil Jon)	2011	—	—	—	—	—	—	
"Get Low"	2012	—	—	—	—	—	—	
"Dutchland"	2012	—	—	—	—	—	—	
"Better Than Yesterday" (featuring will.i.am)	2012	84	—	—	95	—	—	
"Torrent" (with Martin Garrix)	2013	—	—	—	—	—	—	
"Revenge of the Acid" (with Killfake)	2013	—	—	—	—	—	—	
"Celebrate the Rain" (with Eva Simons)	2014	23	—	—	—	—	—	
"Escape from Love" (with Eva Simons)	2016	60	—	—	—	—	69	
"Riverside (Reloaded)" (with Tujamo)	2018	—	—	—	—	—	94	
"Soldier" (with G Wise)	2018	—	—	—	—	—	—	
"Raveheart" (with Vito Mendez)	2018	—	—	—	—	—	—	
"Drop It Down" (featuring Vasin)	2018	—	—	—	—	—	—	
"Bomba Latina" (with X-Tof and Bowman featuring Mr. Pig and Zafra Negra)	2019	—	—	—	—	—	—	
"In Control" (with Linka & Outgang)	2019	—	—	—	—	—	—	
"It's About to Go Down"	2019	—	—	—	—	—	—	
"Laser Rays"	2020	—	—	—	—	—	—	
"Your Way" (with Killfake)	2020	—	—	—	—	—	—	
"Raise It Up" (with Killfake and Bobso Architect)	2020	—	—	—	—	—	—	
"Matalo" (with Marboo)	2020	—	—	—	—	—	—	
"Tekno Nights" (with Outgang)	2021	—	—	—	—	—	—	
"Hurricane" (with Bowman and Bleam featuring Marboo)	2021	—	—	—	—	—	—	
"Outta My Head" (with Rawdolff featuring Tara McDonald)	2021	—	—	—	—	—	—	
"Get Over Here" (featuring Tara McDonald)	2021	—	—	—	—	—	—	
"House Music Forever" (with Sjaak and Jules Brand)	2021	—	—	—	—	—	—	
"—" denotes a recording that did not chart or was not released in that territory.

==== Others ====
- Emporium (with Tony Cha Cha) (Spinnin') (2009)
- Set Me On Fire (with Tara McDonald) (Spinnin') (2011)
- Dynamite (with Tara McDonald) (incl. Nicky Romero Remix) (Rock the Houze) (2011)
- Filter (Rock the Houze) (2011)
- Blasted (Rock the Houze) (2011)
- Music Box (Rock the Houze) (2011)
- Hold Up (Rock the Houze) (2012)
- Something In the Air (featuring Tony Cha Cha) (Spinnin') (2012)
- YLB (with Leroy Styles) (Musical Freedom) (2013)
- Move (Rock the Houze) (2013)
- GO (featuring Gwise) (Rock the Houze) (2013)
- Good Time (Dreamfields Anthem 2013) (Rock the Houze) (2013)
- Make the Club Go Like (featuring Alvita) (Rock the Houze) (2013)
- Thunderbolt (with Justin Prime) (Spinnin') (2014)
- Trojan (Doorn) (2014)
- Magic (with Yves V) (Smash The House) (2015)
- Guess Who's Back (with Gwise) (Smash The House) (2015)
- Kamikaze (with Kura) (Free Download) (2015)
- Oohwok On Fleek (featuring Yeshua Alexander) (Artificial Recordings) (2015)
- Lit (with Onderkoffer featuring MC Ambush) (Artificial Recordings) (2015)
- Through The Fire (with Onderkoffer featuring Ingrid Simons) (Artificial Recordings) (2015)
- Firecracker (with Onderkoffer) (Artificial Recordings) (2015)
- Whiplash (featuring Far East Movement and Onderkoffer) (Artificial Recordings) (2015)
- Ready For Action (featuring MC Roga) (Armada Trice) (2016)
- Gangstah (featuring Bobso Architect) (Kingpin Society) (2017)
- Enemy of the Hate (featuring ISA and Bobso Architect) (Kingpin Society) (2017)
- The Officer (with Shaggy featuring Bobso Architect and Hosai) (Spinnin') (2018)
- Thop (with Sjaak) (TopNotch) (2018)
- Brut Riddim (with Gregor Salto) [Salto Sounds] (2018)

==== As featured artist ====
List of singles as featured artist, with selected chart positions, showing year released and album name
Title	Year	Peak chart positions			Album
Title	Year	NLD	BEL	GER	Album
"Change Your Life" (Far East Movement featuring Flo Rida and Sidney Samson)	2012	—	—	91	Dirty Bass
"Bubbels" (Yes-R featuring Sidney Samson)	2013	72	—	—	Non-album singles
"Bludfire" (Eva Simons featuring Sidney Samson)	2015	56	34	—	Non-album singles
"Durven" (Bamo, Sjaak and Jack Lewis featuring Raynor Bruges and Sidney Samson)	2018	—	—	—	Non-album singles
"—" denotes a recording that did not chart or was not released in that territory.

==== Remixes ====
- 2019: Sultan & Shepard and Showtek — "We Found Love" (Sidney Samson Remix)
- 2020: Will Jay — "Nights Like These" (Sidney Samson Remix)
