= Live My Life (song) =

Single by Far East Movement featuring Justin Bieber

from the album Dirty Bass
- Released: February 25, 2012
- Recorded: Antwerp, Brussels (Boem Labo Studio); New York City, United States (Jungle City Studios); Century City, United States (Short Bus Studios); Hollywood, United States (Henson Recording Studios)
- Genre: Dance-pop; electropop
- Length: 3:59 (w/o Redfoo); 4:16 (w/ Redfoo)
- Label: Cherrytree; Interscope
- Songwriters: RedOne; Kevin Nishimura; James Roh; Jae Choung; Virman Coquia; Nathan Walker; Justin Bieber; John Mamann; Jean Claude Sindres; Yohanne Simon; Bilal Hajji; Redfoo (add.); Martin Kierszenbaum (add.)
- Producers: RedOne; De Paris; Redfoo (remixer)

Far East Movement singles chronology
"Jello" (2011)	"Live My Life" (2012)	"Lights Out (Go Crazy)" (2012)

Justin Bieber singles chronology
"All I Want for Christmas Is You (SuperFestive!)" (2011)	"Live My Life" (2012)	"Boyfriend" (2012)

Redfoo singles chronology
"Live My Life (Party Rock Remix)" (2012)	"Bring Out the Bottles" (2012)

Music video
- "Live My Life" on YouTube

"Live My Life" is a song by American group Far East Movement from their fourth studio album Dirty Bass. The song was released on February 25, 2012, as the album's lead single. It features vocals from Canadian singer Justin Bieber. The song was produced by RedOne and De Paris.

The official remix of the song subtitled "Live My Life (Party Rock Remix)", features vocals from Redfoo of LMFAO. The track was released on March 6, 2012, as a digital download. Also, it was included as the last track of the standard edition of Dirty Bass.

== Music video ==
A music video to accompany the release of "Live My Life" was first released onto YouTube on April 5, 2012 through Far East Movement's Vevo channel at a total length of 4 minutes and 43 seconds. Justin Bieber did not appear in the video, but Redfoo and the Party Rock crew do. They are seen throughout the video touring and dancing through the streets of Amsterdam in the Party Rock bus, was filmed in the Netherlands. They also perform a synchronized dance routine in a flash mob-style. Far East Movement perform their respective verses. Dutch singer Eva Simons cameos in the video, seen entering the party bus midway through the video, as well as Dutch DJs Sidney Samson, Sick Individuals and Quintino. The music video has over 66 million views.

An alternate video edit was made for the Party Rock Remix at a total length of 4 minutes and 38 seconds. It features the same scenes from the original and includes Redfoo performing his verse. This version has over 25 million views.

The videos were written by Redfoo and Kelly Covell and directed by Mickey Finnegan (who has previously directed music videos for LMFAO's songs such as "Party Rock Anthem" and "Sexy and I Know It" among others) while production was handled by Cisco Newman and Alexa Dedlow.

The video makes a reference to John Cusack's character from the film Say Anything...; it begins with Kev Nish holding up a boombox while standing outside of a female lead's apartment window, and ends with him taking her home.

== Track listing ==
Digital download
No.	Title	Length
1.	"Live My Life" (featuring Justin Bieber)	3:59

Digital download – remix
No.	Title	Length
1.	"Live My Life" (Party Rock Remix) (featuring Justin Bieber and Redfoo)	4:16

Digital download – EP
No.	Title	Length
1.	"Live My Life" (featuring Justin Bieber)	3:59
2.	"Live My Life" (Party Rock Remix) (featuring Justin Bieber and Redfoo)	4:15
3.	"Live My Life" (Wideboys Full Club Remix) (featuring Justin Bieber)	5:46
4.	"Jello" (featuring Rye Rye)	2:52

CD single
No.	Title	Length
1.	"Live My Life" (featuring Justin Bieber)	3:59
2.	"Live My Life" (Party Rock Remix) (featuring Justin Bieber and Redfoo)	4:14

== Credits and personnel ==
- Vocals – Far East Movement and Justin Bieber.
- Lyrics – Bilal "The Chef" Hajji, Kevin Michael Nishimura, James Hwan Roh, Jae Won Choung, Virman Pau Coquia, Nathan Lawrence Walker, Justin Bieber
- Musician – Nadir "RedOne" Khayat, Jonathan Maman, Jean Claude Sindress, Yohanne Simon (De Paris)
- Producer, instrumentation, programming – RedOne and Yohanne Simon (De Paris)
- Recording – Trevor Muzzy, Jeremy "J" Stevenson, Jaime "Jimmy Cash" Lepe and Kyle Kashiwagi
- Vocal producer (Justin Bieber's vocals) – Kuk Harrell
- Vocal recording and editing (Justin Bieber's vocals) – Josh Gudwin, Chris "TEK" O'Ryan
- Remixer, additional vocals (Party Rock Remix) – Stefan Kendal "Redfoo" Gordy
- Additional keyboards (Party Rock Remix) – Martin "Cherry Cherry Boom Boom" Kierszenbaum
- Mixing – Robert Orton
- Mastering – Gene Grimaldi
- Label: Cherrytree Records / Interscope Records

== Charts ==
=== Weekly charts ===
Chart (2012)	Peak position
Australia (ARIA)	14
Austria (Ö3 Austria Top 40)	20
Belgium (Ultratip Bubbling Under Flanders)	39
Belgium (Ultratip Bubbling Under Wallonia)	1
Canada Hot 100 (Billboard)	4
Czech Republic Airplay (ČNS IFPI)	14
Denmark (Tracklisten)	17
Finland (Suomen virallinen lista)	15
France (SNEP)	37
Germany (GfK)	8
Ireland (IRMA)	6
Japan Hot 100 (Billboard)	12
Luxembourg Digital Songs (Billboard)	2
Netherlands (Single Top 100)	45
New Zealand (Recorded Music NZ)	15
Norway (VG-lista)	3
Russia Airplay (TopHit)	3
Scottish Singles Sales (Official Charts)	7
Slovakia Airplay (ČNS IFPI)	3
South Korea International Chart (Gaon)	1
Sweden (Sverigetopplistan)	13
Switzerland (Schweizer Hitparade)	6
UK Singles (Official Charts)	7
Ukraine Airplay (TopHit)	91
US Billboard Hot 100	21

=== Year-end charts ===
Chart (2012)	Position
Australia (ARIA)	100
Canada (Canadian Hot 100)	85
France (SNEP)	104
Germany (Media Control AG)	96
Russia Airplay (TopHit)	36
Sweden (Sverigetopplistan)	57
UK Singles (Official Charts Company)	190

== Certifications ==
Region	Certification	Certified units/sales
Australia (ARIA)	Platinum	70,000^{^}
Canada (Music Canada)	Platinum	80,000^{‡}
Germany (BVMI)	Gold	150,000^{‡}
New Zealand (RMNZ)	Platinum	15,000^{*}
Streaming
Denmark (IFPI Danmark)	Platinum	1,800,000^{†}
^{*} Sales figures based on certification alone.^{^} Shipments figures based on certification alone.^{‡} Sales+streaming figures based on certification alone.^{†} Streaming-only figures based on certification alone.

== Release history ==
Region	Date	Format	Label
United States	February 28, 2012	Digital download	Cherrytree Records; Interscope Records
United States	March 6, 2012	Digital download – remix	Cherrytree Records; Interscope Records
United States	April 3, 2012	Rhythmic contemporary radio airplay	Cherrytree Records; Interscope Records
Germany; Austria; Switzerland	April 6, 2012	CD single	Cherrytree Records; Interscope Records
United Kingdom	May 6, 2012	Digital download – EP	Cherrytree Records; Interscope Records
