= The Illest =

Single by Far East Movement featuring Riff Raff or Schoolboy Q

from the album Dirty Bass and Ktown Riot
- Released: July 2, 2013 (for version w/ RiFF RAFF); April 16, 2014 (for version w/ ScHoolboy Q)
- Recorded: 2013
- Genre: Trap-pop; hip house
- Length: 3:40
- Label: Cherrytree; Interscope
- Songwriters: Andreas Schuller; Eric Frederic; Kevin "Kev Nish" Nishimura; James "Prohgress" Roh; Jae "J-Splif" Choung; DJ Virman Coquia; Quincey Hanley; Horst Simco; Bobby Ray Simmons Jr
- Producers: Axident; Wallpaper.

Far East Movement singles chronology
"Get Up (Rattle)" (2012)	"The Illest" (2013)	"Bang It to the Curb" (2014)

Riff Raff singles chronology
"Dolce and Gabbana" (2013)	"The Illest" (2013)	"Mr. Popular" (2013)

ScHoolboy Q singles chronology
"2 On" (2014)	"The Illest" (2014)	"Studio" (2014)

Music video
- "The Illest" on YouTube

"The Illest" is a song by American hip hop group Far East Movement. The song was co-written and produced by Norwegian music producer and songwriter Axident and Wallpaper. aka Ricky Reed, and features a guest appearance from American rapper Riff Raff. It was released digitally as a single on July 2, 2013 and has since peaked at number 18 on the US Billboard Hot Rap Songs. "The Illest" was featured as a bonus track and a single from the 2013 Special Edition release of their fourth studio album Dirty Bass (becoming the album's fifth single overall).

== Background ==
"The Illest" was originally featured on Far East Movement released a mixtape titled GRZZLY that was released on May 29, 2013. Then a few days later the group released a new version of the song, now featuring rapper Riff Raff. On July 2, 2013, the new version was released for digital download as a single by Cherrytree Records and Interscope Records. Far East Movement then created a Tumblr titled FuckYeahIllest to help promote the song. The song was then featured on their EP Murder Was the Bass, which was released on December 9, 2013. They also have said the song would be featured on their upcoming fifth studio album.

== Music video ==
The music video was directed by Mike Clattenburg and filmed at Los Angeles Center Studios. It was released on July 23, 2013, with a cameo appearance by Hugh Jackman. It features a blindingly dull office getting raided and destroyed by Far East Movement and Riff Raff, in a manner that nods to Office Space and Workaholics. Additionally the music video features cameo appearances from Lil Debbie, Dumbfoundead, Jeffree Star, Nice Peter, Watsky among other popular YouTube personalities.

A second music video was released on April 15, 2014 in support of their Ktown Riot EP. The video was inspired by the Koreatown riots of 1992. Snoop Dogg makes a cameo appearance, as well as Los Angeles / Koreatown residents Tokimonsta. Riff Raff is also seen performing his verse.

A video was also made using a mash-up of the Deorro and Victor Niglio remixes. It was published to YouTube through the group's Vevo channel on December 10, 2013, and features scenes from The Illest Tour.

== Remix ==
On March 4, 2014, the official remix, mixed by DJ Eman, was released. The remix features guest appearances by Schoolboy Q and B.o.B, as well as Riff Raff's verse from the original. On April 16, 2014, an alternate version of the song, featuring a slightly altered arrangement and vocals from Schoolboy Q, was released as a digital download. This version was included as the lead track on their late-2014 EP Ktown Riot.

== Track listing ==
2013 digital download (version with Riff Raff)
No.	Title	Writer(s)	Producer(s)	Length
1.	"The Illest" (featuring Riff Raff)	Andreas Schuller, Eric Frederic, Kevin Nishimura, Jae Choung, James Roh, Virman Coquia, Horst Simco	Axident, Wallpaper.	3:40

2014 digital download (version with Schoolboy Q)
No.	Title	Writer(s)	Producer(s)	Length
1.	"The Illest" (featuring ScHoolboy Q)	Andreas Schuller, Eric Frederic, Kevin Nishimura, Jae Choung, James Roh, Virman Coquia, Quincey Hanley	Axident, Wallpaper.	3:40

The Illest (Remixes)
No.	Title	Length
1.	"The Illest (DEORRO Remix)" (featuring Riff Raff)	3:35
2.	"The Illest (Victor Niglio Remix)" (featuring Riff Raff)	4:20
3.	"The Illest (Kronic Remix)" (featuring Riff Raff)	4:42
4.	"The Illest (Rell The Soundbender Remix)" (featuring Riff Raff)	4:42
5.	"The Illest (KTown Shekki X Savagez Remix)" (featuring Riff Raff)	6:19

== Credits and personnel ==
- Lead vocals – Far East Movement
- Producers – Axident, Wallpaper.
- Writers – A. Schuller, R. Reed, K. Nishimura, J. Roh, J. Choung, V. Coquia, J. Christian
- Label: Cherrytree Records / Interscope Records

== Chart performance ==
Chart (2014)	Peak position
Germany (Deutsche Black Charts)	20
US Bubbling Under Hot 100 (Billboard)	7
US Hot Rap Songs (Billboard)	18
US Rhythmic Airplay (Billboard)	21

== Release history ==
for version w/ RiFF RAFF
Country	Date	Format	Label
United States; Canada	July 2, 2013	Digital download – single	Cherrytree Records, Interscope Records
United States; Canada	February 4, 2014	Rhythmic contemporary radio airplay	Cherrytree Records, Interscope Records
United States; Canada	April 22, 2014	Digital download – Remixes	Cherrytree Records, Interscope Records
for version w/ ScHoolboy Q
Country	Date	Format	Label
United States; Canada	April 16, 2014	Digital download – single	Cherrytree Records, Interscope Records
