= Identity (Far East Movement album) =

Studio album by Far East Movement
- Released: October 21, 2016
- Recorded: 2015–2016
- Genre: EDM; pop
- Length: 39:00
- Label: Transparent Agency; Spinnin'; eOne Music
- Producer: Far East Movement; Autolaser; Marshmello; MNEK; Gill Chang; King Chain; Cory Enemy; MIKNNA; Thomas Helsloot; Cimo Frankel; Rik Annema

Far East Movement chronology
KTown Riot EP (2014)	Identity (2016)

Singles from Identity
- 1. "Freal Luv" Released: October 14, 2016; 2. "Don't Speak" Released: December 8, 2016

Identity is the fifth studio album primarily written and conducted by American hip hop music group Far East Movement. It was released on October 21, 2016 through Spinnin' Records and Transparent Agency. The album features artists from diverse backgrounds, especially those from Korea and America, as a nod to Far East Movement's Koreatown origins. The band itself describes the album as "a Far East Movement, in a sense, bridging artists from the east with artists from the west while fusing different genres we love."

== Background ==
The album was created after Far East Movement's hiatus. The group members were discouraged after facing racism from the public and the music industry. The band traveled to Asia and there began plotting out an album that "could bridge the gap between Asia and America". As reflected in the title, the album was intended to explore the artists' joint Asian and American identities, as well as collaborate with artists from both backgrounds.

== Production ==
The album features the likes of Yoon Mi-rae, Autolaser, Marshmello, Chanyeol, Tinashe, Candice Pillay, No Riddim, Elijah Blake, Tiffany, King Chain, Jay Park, MNEK, Hyolyn, Gill Chang, Soulja Boy, Loco, Big K.R.I.T., MIKNNA, Macy Gray and Urban Zakapa.

As Far East Movement wanted to collaborate with artists on both sides of the Pacific, they flew back and forth between the US and South Korea. Kevin Nishimura described collaborating with artists as a "slow and challenging process that involved building and nurturing relationships with artists."

The album was the first album released by Far East Movement's own company, Transparent Agency.

== Critical reception ==
Crystal Leww of MTV commented, "Identity is a distinctly Asian-American album, and it speaks to the very specific experience of a group of people who are often seen as foreigners in their own home. But there’s no sense of loss here – Far East Movement have made a cohesive, exciting celebration of that hybrid life." Neil Z. Young of AllMusic rated the album four stars out of five, describing it as a "mature and transformative effort that succeeds in honoring their roots by bridging the gap between their Asian and American cultures."

== Track listing ==
Identity track listing
No.	Title	Writer(s)	Producer(s)	Length
1.	"Fighter" (featuring Yoon Mi-rae & Autolaser)	Kevin Nishimura; Mario Dillard II; Shaunice Jones; Natasha Shanta Reid; Kent Tonning; Virman Coquia; James Roh	Far East Movement; Autolaser	4:14
2.	"Freal Luv" (with Marshmello featuring Tinashe & Chanyeol)	Nishimura; Coquia; Roh; Chris Comstock; William Phillips; Tinashe Kachingwe; Park Chanyeol	Marshmello	3:10
3.	"F-VR" (featuring Candice Pillay & No Riddim)	Nishimura; Coquia; Roh; G. Isik; Candice Pillay; Jaime Lepe; A. Cekin; E. Latu	No Riddim	2:51
4.	"Church" (featuring Elijah Blake)	Nishimura; Coquia; Roh; Tonning; Cimo Frankel; Rik Annema; Thomas Helsloot	Marshmello; Far East Movement; Helsloot; Frankel; Annema; Autolaser	4:05
5.	"Don't Speak" (featuring Tiffany & King Chain)	Nishimura; Coquia; Roh; Tsao-Chiang Chen; Tonning; Tiffany Hwang; Abigail Browning; Kahmarl Gordon	Far East Movement; Autolaser; King Chain	3:25
6.	"SXWME" (featuring Jay Park & MNEK)	Nishimura; Roh; Coquia; Uzoechi Emenike; Winston Coleman; Park Jae-beom	MNEK	3:34
7.	"Umbrella" (featuring Hyolyn & Gill Chang)	Nishimura; Roh; Coquia; Tonning; Jones; Kim Hyo-jung; Gill Chang	Far East Movement; Autolaser; Chang	4:06
8.	"Double Dip" (featuring Soulja Boy & Loco)	Nishimura; Roh; Coquia; Cory Nitta; Kwon Hyuk-woo; DeAndre Cortez Way	Far East Movement; Cory Emeny	2:54
9.	"FBG$" (featuring Big K.R.I.T. & Miknna)	Nishimura; Roh; Coquia; Ken Nanakornpanom; Justin Scott	Miknna	3:18
10.	"Forever Survivor" (featuring Macy Gray)	Nishimura; Coquia; Roh; Tonning; Jones; Natalie Renée McIntyre	Far East Movement; Autolaser	4:00
11.	"Fortress" (featuring Urban Zakapa)	Nishimura; Roh; Coquia; Tonning; Park Yong-in; Lee Anna McCollum; Kwon Sun-il; Jo Hyun-ah	Far East Movement; Autolaser	3:52
Total length:				39:00

== Charts ==
Chart performance for Identity
Chart (2016)	Peak position
South Korean Albums (Gaon)	51
US Top Dance/Electronic Albums (Billboard)	7
