= Wallpaper (musician) =

American singer-songwriter

Wallpaper.
- Origin: Oakland, California, U.S.
- Genres: Hip hop, electronic, pop
- Years active: 2005–2014
- Label: Boardwalk Records/Epic
- Members: Ricky Reed; Novena Carmel; Arjun Singh; Derek Taylor; Tom Peyton

Wallpaper was an American hip hop and pop music project, fronted by producer, multi-instrumentalist, and songwriter Eric Frederic (better known as Ricky Reed) based in Oakland, California. The group also featured Novena Carmel, Arjun Singh, Derek Taylor, and Tom Peyton. Wallpaper was signed to Boardwalk Records/Epic Records and notably played at SXSW. The band, founded in 2005, was known for their lyrics, which Frederic has characterized as satire of pop music and consumer culture, as well as for their early use of exaggerated auto-tune.

During their run, the group released two studio albums, four extended plays, five singles and three promotional singles. Their second studio album, Ricky Reed Is Real (2013), became their most successful record, peaking within the top 10 of the US Billboard Heatseekers Chart. The group was also credited for producing for Far East Movement's 2013 single, "The Illest" (featuring Riff Raff or Schoolboy Q). Two of their own singles also charted. In 2014, the group disbanded, and Frederic would later continue working with the progressive indie group Facing New York.

== Background ==
=== 2005–2012: Formation, early releases, and DooDoo Face ===
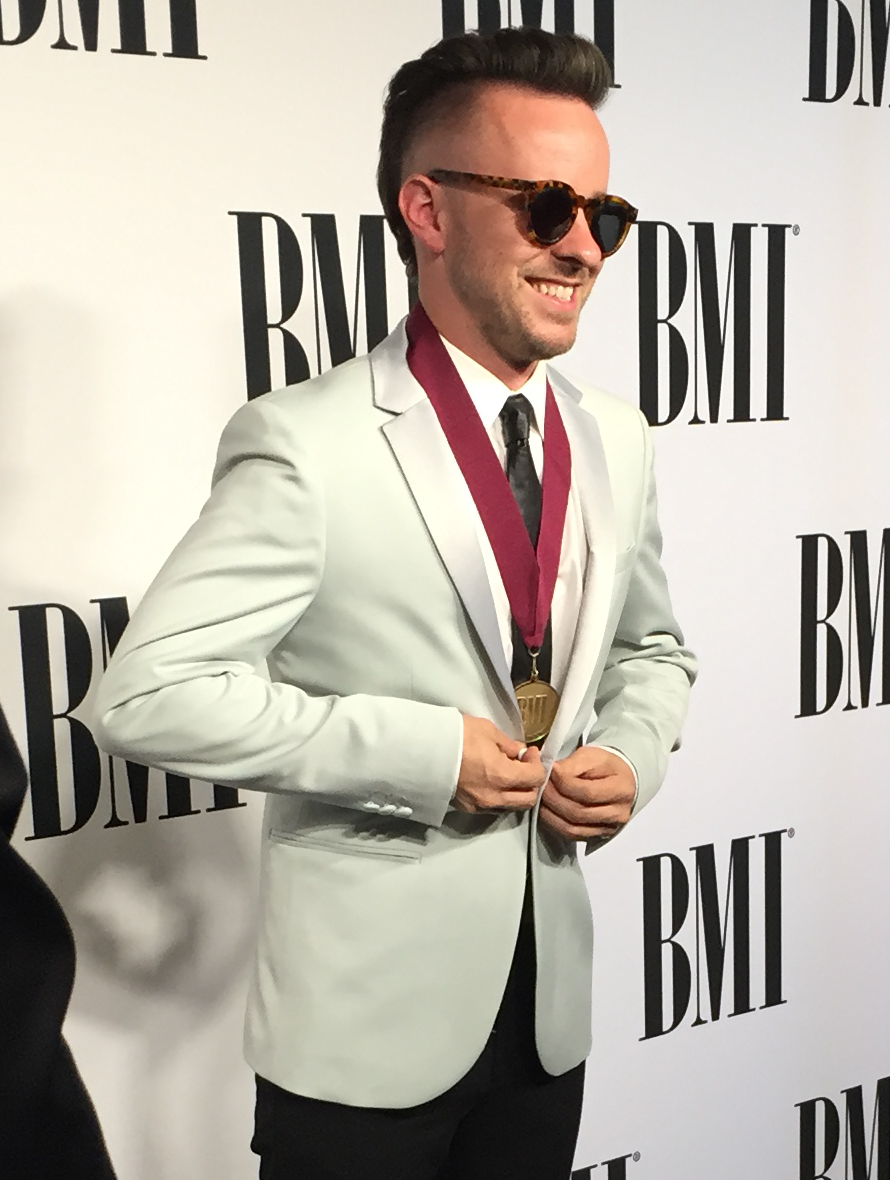
Wallpaper founder Ricky Reed (pictured at the 2015 BMI Pop Awards)

In 2005, Eric Frederic began experimenting with music that emphasized the effects of auto-tune, an approach which was, at the time, still relatively uncommon. Frederic named this solo project Wallpaper and was joined by Arjun Singh on drums. Frederic performed as "Ricky Reed" an alter-ego he had created to be the bands frontman; Reed was described as rude, reckless, and irresponsible, and was intended to personify everything Frederic disliked about the contemporary pop music industry. The band released their self-titled debut extended play (EP) on the 1st of April, 2006, through Five One, Inc. Over two years later, on the 29th of April, 2008, the band released their second EP, T Rex, through Eenie Meenie Records. The EP was accompanied with a remix EP on the 23rd of December that same year, titled T REX RMXd.

As exaggerated auto-tune became more prevalent in the mainstream, Wallpaper's songs gained popularity, and their debut studio album, DooDoo Face, was released on the 8th of September, 2009. The album was accompanied by Wallpaper's debut single, "I Got Soul, I'm So Wasted", released that same year. Almost two years later, on the 2nd of August, 2011, the duo released the EP #STUPiDFACEDD, co-distributed by MTV's Hype Music and Boardwalk Records, alongside Epic Records. This was followed by a music video for the lead single of the same name, described as "a brash, stupid party anthem to mock all brash, stupid party anthems."

In 2011, Wallpaper toured with K.Flay and Too Short, and appeared at the MTV Video Music Awards. Later that year, the band toured with Awolnation, then with Gym Class Heroes and Dirty Heads, closing the tour at The Grove in Anaheim, California. By this time, Frederic had fully adopted the name Ricky Reed in a professional capacity, and was no longer referred to by his real name in interviews and press releases. Despite this, he had long since abandoned the idea of staying "in character" as Reed outside of Wallpaper's lyrics. One year later, Wallpaper signed to Epic Records in 2012 and expanded their lineup once more, this time to include vocalist Novena Carmel and percussionists Derek Taylor and Tom Peyton.

Their performance at Coachella in April received acclaim, with critics comparing it favorably to "boa constrictor-era" Britney Spears. Following an appearance at South by Southwest, Wallpaper appeared on Jimmy Kimmel Live! and Last Call with Carson Daly Tonight to perform #STUPiDFACEDD's title track, as well as its second and final single, "Fucking Best Song Everrr". The latter track charted at number 36 on the US Billboard Pop Airplay chart and peaked at number 8 on the US Billboard Dance Club Songs chart.

=== 2013–2014: Ricky Reed Is Real and dissolution ===
In 2012, the band covered the theme song to the television series 21 Jump Street for the film adaptation of the same name, The following year, in 2013, Wallpaper released their second full-length album, entitled Ricky Reed Is Real, to mostly positive reviews from fans and critics. Commercially, the album charted at number 10 on the US Billboard Heatseekers Chart. Its lead single, "Good 4 It", charted at number 18 on the US Billboard Dance Club Songs chart. A promotional single, "Drunken Hearts", was also released that same year. They later released the second and final single from Ricky Reed Is Real, "Hesher", in 2014, before dissolving that same year. Around this time, Frederic occasionally produced music for other artists (such as "Anyway" by Cee-Lo Green) and Wallpaper collectively shares a producer credit on Far East Movement's 2013 single "The Illest" (featuring Riff Raff or Schoolboy Q).

As of 2021, all social media accounts for Wallpaper have been removed or deleted excluding their YouTube account, which has not received an update since 2014. Frederic appears to be focusing his efforts on producing for other artists and his progressive indie rock band, Facing New York.

== Discography ==
=== Albums ===
List of albums, with selected chart positions
Title	Album details	Peak chart positions
Title	Album details	US Heat
DooDoo Face	Released: September 8, 2009; Label: eenie meenie; Format: CD, digital download	—
Ricky Reed Is Real	Released: July 23, 2013; Label: Epic, Boardwalk; Format: CD, digital download	10

=== Extended plays ===
Title	EP details
Wallpaper.	Released: April 1, 2006; Label: Five One, Inc.; Formats: Digital download
T Rex	Released: April 29, 2008; Label: eenie meenie; Formats: Digital download
T REX RMXd	Released: December 23, 2008; Label: eenie meenie; Formats: Digital download
#STUPiDFACEDD	Released: August 2, 2011; Label: Epic; Formats: CD, Digital download

=== Singles ===
List of singles by title, year and peak chart positions, and album
Title	Year	Peak chart positions			Album
Title	Year	US	US Dance	US Pop	Album
"I Got Soul, I'm So Wasted"	2009	—	—	—	Doodoo Face
"#STUPiDFACEDD"	2011	—	—	—	#STUPiDFACEDD
"Fucking Best Song Everrr"	2012	—	8	36	#STUPiDFACEDD
"Good 4 It"	2013	—	18	—	Ricky Reed Is Real
"Hesher"	2014	—	—	—	Ricky Reed Is Real
"—" denotes releases that did not chart.

=== Promotional singles ===
Title	Year	Album
"Valentine"	2010	Non-album single
"21 Jump Street" (Main Theme)	2012	Non-album single
"Drunken Hearts"	2013	Ricky Reed Is Real
