= Eli "Paperboy" Reed =

American singer and songwriter (born 1983)

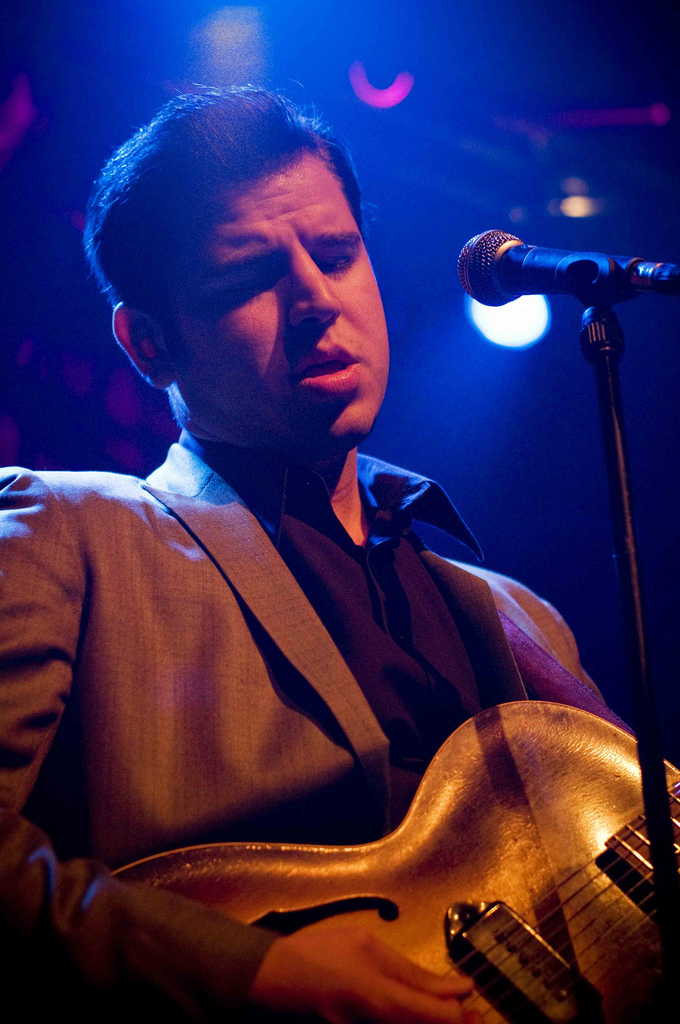
- Eli Paperboy Reed performing April 27, 2009; Photo: Chris Hakkens

Background information
- Born: 1983 (age 42–43)
- Genres: Soul, R&B
- Occupation: Singer-songwriter
- Labels: Yep Roc Records, Warner Bros. Records
- Website: elipaperboyreed.com

Eli "Paperboy" Reed (né Husock; born 1983) is an American singer and songwriter. After graduating from Brookline High School in 2002, he moved to Clarksdale, Mississippi. After spending a year in Clarksdale, he enrolled at The University of Chicago to study sociology. While in Chicago, he hosted a radio show called "We Got More Soul" on WHPK and played organ and piano in the South Side Chicago church of Mitty Collier. After one year of study in Chicago, he returned home to Boston to focus on music, recording his first album Sings "Walkin' and Talkin' for My Baby" and Other Smash Hits!

After his album release and his live shows, Reed signed with Somerville, Massachusetts based record label, Q Division Records. He recorded his first album of original material, Roll With You, in late 2007 with Q Division producer Ed Valauskas. The album was released in 2008, and the next two years saw Reed garner a national and international following. He signed to Virgin before later switching to their parent label Capitol Records in 2009.

Come And Get It!, Reed's major label debut, was produced by Mike Elizondo. Speaking in March 2010 to British soul writer Pete Lewis, Reed stated the album was strongly influenced by the late 1960s/early 1970s Chicago soul music recordings of artists such as Tyrone Davis and Mel & Tim.

Reed was nominated for Breakthrough Artist of the Year at the 2009 MOJO Awards.

Reed signed to Warner Bros. Records in late 2012 and released a 45 RPM single featuring a vinyl only version of a new song, "WooHoo", on Record Store Day, April 20, 2013. His fourth album was released in 2014 by Yep Roc Records, and My Way Home followed in 2016.

Reed's song "Your Sins Will Find You Out" was featured in Episode 4 of the first season of Preacher, and "Recess" appears in both The Way Way Back (2013) and Europa Report (2013).

On January 22, 2019, Reed announced the April 12 release of his album, 99 Cent Dreams, via Yep Roc Records. It was recorded at the Sam Phillips Recording studio in Memphis with record producer Matt Ross-Spang and background vocals from the Memphis vocal group The Masqueraders. The collection was chosen as a 'Favorite Blues Album' by AllMusic.

== Discography ==
- Sings "Walkin' and Talkin' for My Baby" and Other Smash Hits! (Double E Records, 2005)
- Roll with You (Q Division Records, 2008)
- Come and Get It! (Capitol Records, 2010)
- Nights Like This (Warner Bros., 2014)
- My Way Home (Yep Roc, 2016)
- 99 Cent Dreams (Yep Roc Records, 2019)
- Down Every Road (Yep Roc Records, 2022)
- Getting There (Yep Roc Records, 2026)
