= Far East Movement =

American hip-hop and electronic music group

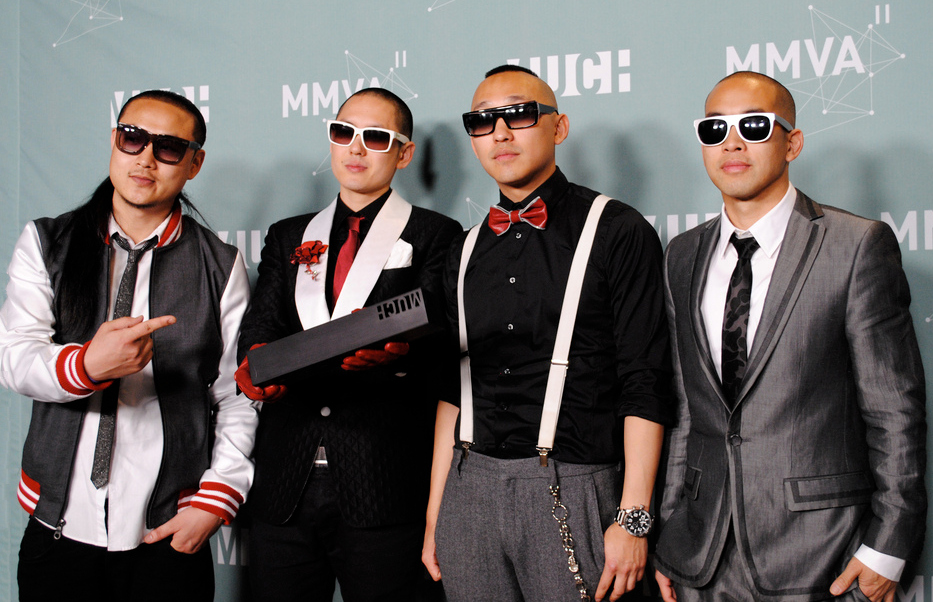
- Far East Movement in 2011

Background information
- Origin: Los Angeles, California, U.S.
- Genres: Hip-hop; pop; EDM; synth-pop; electro hop; electropop; pop rap; alternative hip hop; hip house
- Works: Far East Movement discography
- Years active: 2003–present
- Labels: Cherrytree; Interscope; Delicious Deli; Spinnin'; Transparent Arts; Entertainment One
- Members: Kev Nish; Prohgress; DJ Virman
- Past members: J-Splif
- Website: fareastmovement.com

Far East Movement (abbreviated FM) is an American hip-hop and electronic music group based in Los Angeles, composed of Kev Nish, Prohgress, J-Splif, Jon Street, Ray Ro, DJ Virman, and Jerm Beats. They signed with Martin Kierszenbaum's Cherrytree Records, an imprint of Interscope Records, to release their 2010 single "Like a G6" (featuring The Cataracs and Dev), which peaked at #1 on the Billboard Hot 100, making them the first Asian American group to reach number one on the chart. Their follow-up single, "Rocketeer" (featuring Ryan Tedder), peaked at number seven and led their third album and major label debut, Free Wired (2010). It performed moderately on the Billboard 200, while their fourth album, Dirty Bass (2012) saw a steep commercial decline, although its lead single, "Live My Life" (featuring Justin Bieber) reached number 24 on the Billboard Hot 100.

The group's fifth album, Identity (2016) focused on bridging Eastern artists with the group's Western dance music roots. Released independently, the album received positive reviews and spawned the single "Freal Luv" (with Marshmello featuring Tinashe and Chanyeol). Far East Movement has also branched out with a number of collaborations on labels Ministry of Sound, Dim Mak Records, and Ultra Records.

In 2016, Far East Movement's company, Transparent Arts (TA), moved into artist management. TA manages seven artists of various genres, including Korean-American K-pop artist Tiffany Young, rappers Dumbfoundead and Year of the Ox, DJ producers Yultron and Autolaser, and singer Satica. The artists have garnered millions of social media plays, sold out national tours, and have released tracks through labels Owsla, Spinnin', Armada, and Universal. They launched a joint label, BredNButter, with YouTube channel Trap City. BredNButter's releases have amassed millions of plays in total in a little over a year of existence. They also founded Identity Festival, a festival celebrating Asian American Heritage with the City of Los Angeles on the steps of City Hall which gathered over 10,000 attendees in 2018 with headliners Mike Shinoda of Linkin Park and K-pop singer Jay Park.

== Musical career ==
=== 2003–2007: Folk Music ===
The three original members of Far East Movement, Kevin Nishimura (Kev Nish), James Roh (Prohgress), and Jae Choung (J-Splif), grew up in the Downtown Los Angeles area. They were close companions in high school and shared a passion for music together. The trio promoted their music online and began performing at local clubs and events in Los Angeles; soon, they began their musical career with the name "Emcees Anonymous" by 2001. However, they later changed it to Far East Movement or FM, originating from a song that they produced with the same name. In 2003, they organised an event called "Movementality" in Koreatown, Los Angeles, featuring ten different performances with all the proceeds sent to a local youth drug rehabilitation center.

In 2005, Far East Movement released a mixtape called Audio-Bio, which was one of their first CDs and contained many of their earliest songs and many songs not available anywhere else. Their first album, titled Folk Music, was released in early 2006. The single "Round Round" was featured in the film, The Fast and the Furious: Tokyo Drift, appearing both on the self-titled soundtrack and video game. This critical breakout was the catalyst that cemented their decision to pursue music as a full-time career. Their songs "Get Offa Me" and "Make Ya Self" were featured in The Fast and the Furious video game. They proceeded to perform on two world tours (including USA, South America, Canada, and Asia), and they signed distribution deals in Japan and Korea with Avex Network and JF Productions for their album.

In 2007, they were featured in the Sundance Film Festival film called Finishing the Game, making the song "Satisfaction" for the film. They also released the single "You've Got A Friend" featuring Lil Rob and Baby Bash, which became their first song on major national radio.

=== 2008–2009: DJ Virman and Animal ===
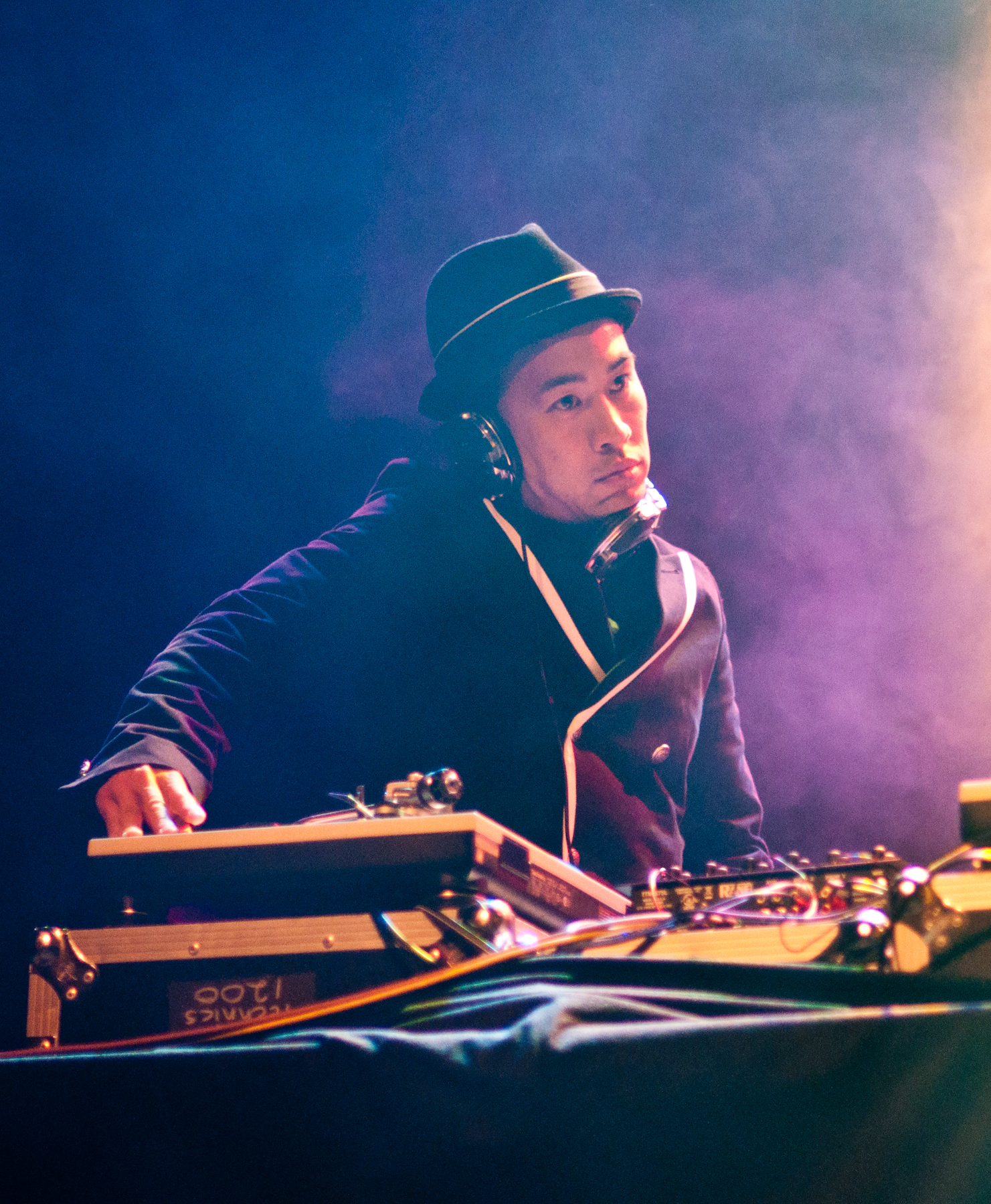
DJ Virman performing with FM in San Diego in 2010

LA's radio station Power 106 DJ, DJ Virman (Virman Coquia), came to the group as their official DJ. They released another single titled "Lowridin" that received heavy airplay in 2009. Soon after, they planned on showcasing a second album, releasing Animal later on in the same year. Animal featured three hit singles that frequently won national radio play: "You’ve Got A Friend", "Lowridin", and the successful "Girls on the Dance Floor". "Girls on the Dance Floor" reached 27 on the Billboard chart for the Latin Rhythm Airplay, which marked their debut on the Billboard's charts.

There were several collaborations on the Animal album, including The Stereotypes, Lil Rob, Baby Bash, Wiz Khalifa, Bionik, MC Jin, 24/8, IZ, DB Tonik, Jah Free, and Bruno Mars, that made his first appearance on an official track for the first time on the track "3D". Their songs from the Animal album were featured in major film and television on multiple occasions. FM's single "Girls on the Dance Floor" has been played on MTV's America's Best Dance Crew on the Season 4 Finale during a performance with Artistry In Motion, Vogue Evolution and We Are Heroes. It was also featured on Get Him to the Greek, FOX's So You Think You Can Dance and on the 7th episode of CSI: Miami Season 8. In addition, "Dance Like Michael Jackson" was aired on ABC Family's Lincoln Heights on November 10, 2009 and on the Gossip Girl episode, "Dan de Fleurette". "I Party" was highlighted on FOX's TV series Lie To Me and "Fetish" was on Spike TV's Guy's Choice Awards 2009. "Girls on the Dance Floor" has attained over 5 million hits on Myspace while attracting over 8 million views on YouTube.

Streetwear company Orisue teamed up with Far East Movement and helped shoot a music video for "Lowridin". In May 2009, Far East Movement joined the Korean hip hop group Epik High on their "Map the Soul" tour throughout the U.S. They then held their first headlining concert at the Roxy Theater in Hollywood by July 2009, which resulted in a sold-out show. Together with Wong Fu Productions, FM has established another three sold-out "International Secret Agents" concerts titled as "ISA", hosted in San Francisco, Los Angeles, and New York in order to promote Asian American artists in the media with performances by Quest Crew, Poreotics, Jay Park, and others.

FM's mixtape Party Animal was released on the first date of LMFAO's Party Rock Tour. Their two singles, "Girls on the Dance Floor" and "2 is Better w/ Ya Boy", garnered successful radio airplay. They later announced that they were working on a new album with Grammy nominated producers, The Stereotypes, who had produced their hit track, "Girls on the Dance Floor".

=== 2010–2011: Cherrytree/Interscope Records and Free Wired ===
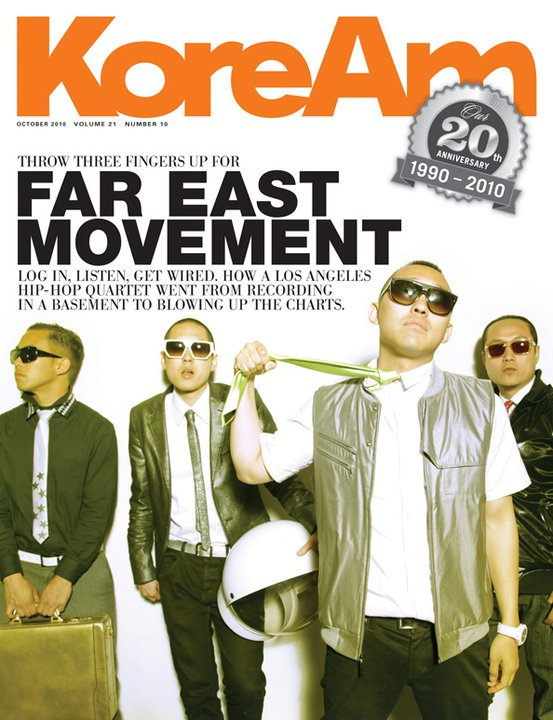
On the cover of KoreAm, October 2010

In February 2010, Far East Movement signed a major record deal with Cherrytree Records, a subsidiary of Interscope Records. They were managed at the time by Ted Chung and Russell Redeaux of Stampede Management.

Later in the same year, the group supported Robyn and Kelis on their double headlining tour along with Dan Black, in addition to being announced as the opening act of Lady Gaga's tour on the Japanese leg of The Monster Ball Tour. Furthermore, their previous hit track, "Girls on the Dancefloor" & "Fetish", was featured in Piranha 3D, yet it was not slotted into the film's soundtrack.

Their 2010 "ISA" shows in New York and LA were held on August 28 and September 5 respectively. They performed their songs alongside acts by AJ Rafael, Jay Park, Wong Fu Productions, Poreotics and Quest Crew (both winners from America's Best Dance Crew), David Choi, Jennifer Chung, David Garibaldi, Lydia Paek, and more.

From September 13 until mid-October, the group was one of the opening acts for the Up In The Air Tour with Mike Posner, across various cities in North America.

Free Wired, their debut album from Cherrytree/Interscope Records, was released on October 12, 2010. The album includes collaborations with Keri Hilson, Lil Jon, Snoop Dogg (a song co-written by Bruno Mars), Mohombi, Colette Carr, Natalia Kills, Koda Kumi, and Ryan Tedder from OneRepublic.

In the October 30, 2010, edition of Billboard Magazine, their single featuring the Cataracs and Dev titled "Like a G6" peaked at number one on the Billboard Hot 100 as well as iTunes. While gathering success for both their album and single, they were featured in a series of tour dates with their Cherrytree/Interscope Record label mate, La Roux, in November 2010.

On November 20, it was confirmed that the group had reached the double Platinum status for "Like a G6", collecting two million in sales. Their second single which was released for airplay as a follow-up to "Like A G6" was "Rocketeer", which featured Ryan Tedder.

The group was awarded Best International Artist in the 2010 M.net Asian Music Awards.

The group toured with Rihanna and Calvin Harris from late February to early March, as part of Rihanna's Last Girl on Earth Tour. Right after the tour ended, the group began headlining their own tour, The Free Wired World Tour. The group visited Manila, Jakarta, Taipei, Hong Kong, Singapore, Seoul, Hamburg and Bangkok. The group were due to tour selected venues in the United Kingdom in early July but cancelled these dates due to recording commitments. However, they performed at the Barclaycard Wireless Festival on July 1 in London.

Far East Movement toured with Lil Wayne on the I Am Still Music tour. On tour, the group took out a second tour bus to work on their second album under the Cherrytree Records label.

=== 2012–2015: Dirty Bass and KTown Riot ===
Their second major label album, Dirty Bass, was released on May 18, 2012. The lead single from the album was "Live My Life", featuring Justin Bieber. It was more successful than the original first single "Jello". The single was released on February 28, 2012, with the release of the music video on March 23, 2012. The video was shot on the streets of Amsterdam, and directed by Mickey Finnegan.

Far East Movement also worked with producers such as David Guetta, Cherry Cherry Boom Boom (aka Cherrytree founder/president Martin Kierszenbaum), will.i.am and RedOne. In September 2012, the group performed in Charlotte with Perez Hilton as part of the 2012 Democratic National Convention. On October 22, 2012, they released a new single, "For All" which they then performed at then President Barack Obama's re-election inauguration.

Far East Movement also performed the official theme song for the first season of the American-Japanese animated series Monsuno, which airs in the United States on Nicktoons.

In January 2013, "Get Up (Rattle)," a song by the Bingo Players on which they were featured, topped the charts in the United Kingdom. It remained at the top of the UK Singles Chart for two weeks before being dethroned by "Thrift Shop" by Macklemore & Ryan Lewis. "Turn Up the Love", a track from "Dirty Bass", reached the top 5 on the overall singles charts in over a dozen countries.

On April 29, 2013, Far East Movement released the song "Lovetron", featuring Travis Garland. On June 2, 2013, they released the song "The Illest", featuring Riff Raff. On January 9, 2014, they released the song "Bang It To The Curb", featuring Sidney Samson. Their EP KTown Riot was released on October 28, 2014.

=== 2016: Identity and J-Splif's departure ===
On September 21, 2016, S.M Entertainment, one of the largest entertainment companies in South Korea, announced that Chanyeol, from popular K-pop band EXO, would be collaborating with Far East Movement in their track "Freal Luv", which also features Tinashe and Marshmello.

On October 10, 2016, Starship Entertainment announced that Hyolyn, from K-pop girl-group Sistar, would be featured in a new song titled "Umbrella".

Both songs were included in the band's fifth studio album, Identity, released on October 21. It features various Korean artists, such as Tiffany from Girls' Generation, rappers Yoon Mi-rae, Jay Park, Loco and R&B group Urban Zakapa, along with American singer-songwriter Macy Gray, rapper Soulja Boy and credits from British singer-producer MNEK. Identity debuted at #1 on the global iTunes dance charts. The music video for "Freal Luv" was viewed over 30 million times on YouTube.

On October 14, 2016, Far East Movement released "We Out Here" featuring Blackbear and Thurz.

On November 23, 2016, Far East Movement announced that J-Splif had left the group due to family reasons.

=== 2017–present: International collaborations & Recent activities ===
On October 26, 2018, Far East Movement released a song titled "Bamboo" which features vocals from Jason Zhang and Kina Grannis.

On February 8, 2019, Far East Movement released a single titled "Blossoms" which features Troop Brand and Chinese rapper Vava.

On March 14, 2019, Far East Movement released a single titled "Lovebird" which features Lay.

On April 19, 2019, Far East Movement released a single titled "Paint the Clouds" which features vocals from Tia Ray.

On June 21, 2019, Far East Movement released a single titled "Maps", featuring Diamond, Starchild Yeezo, and Rell the Soundbender.

On July 26, 2019, Far East Movement released a single titled "Glue", featuring Heize and Shawn Wasabi.

As of 2026, Far East Movement remains largely on an indefinite hiatus from releasing new music since 2021, but members are still active behind the scenes in artist management bridging Western and Asian music markets, and community building for Asian artists. They also still touring as occasional DJ sets including Asia and rest of the world.

== Awards and nominations ==
Award	Year	Nominee(s)	Category	Result	Ref.
Billboard Music Awards	2011	"Like a G6"	Top Rap Song	Nominated	
International Dance Music Awards	2011	Far East Movement	Best Break-Through Artist (Group)	Nominated	
International Dance Music Awards	2011	"Like a G6"	Best Rap/Hip-Hop Dance Track	Won	
MTV Europe Music Awards	2011	Far East Movement	Best New Act	Nominated	
MTV Europe Music Awards	2011	Far East Movement	Best Push Act	Nominated	

== Discography ==
- Folk Music (2006)
- Animal (2009)
- Free Wired (2010)
- Dirty Bass (2012)
- Identity (2016)

== Filmography ==
Year	TV/Movie	Role	Director
2009	"Far East Movement FUTURA" on YouTube	Themselves	Evan Jackson Leong
2010	"Love Kills xx: Episode 3" on YouTube	Mobsters	Natalia Kills
2010	"Free Wired Episode 1 – Downtown L.A is Home" on YouTube	Themselves	DPD, Casey Chan
2011	So Random!	Musical Guest (Themselves)	
2012	America's Best Dance Crew	Musical Guest (Themselves)	
2012	Mac & Devin Go to High School	Detention Students	Jeff Hard
2015	Hell's Kitchen	Dining Room Guests (Themselves)	Sharon Trojan Hollinger

== Members ==
DJ Virman joined the group in 2009. Before joining Far East Movement, he was working as a DJ for the Power 106 radio station in Los Angeles.

On November 23, 2016, the group announced that J-Splif had left due to family issues.

=== Current members ===
- Kev Nish (Kevin Nishimura, Japanese-Chinese, born January 12, 1980) (2003–present)
- Prohgress (James Roh, South Korean, born November 28, 1984) (2003–present)
- DJ Virman (Virman Coquia, Filipino) (2009–present)
- J-Splif (Jae Choung, South Korean, born February 11, 1984) (2003–2016)

== See also ==
- List of artists who reached number one in the United States
