= Lizzo discography =

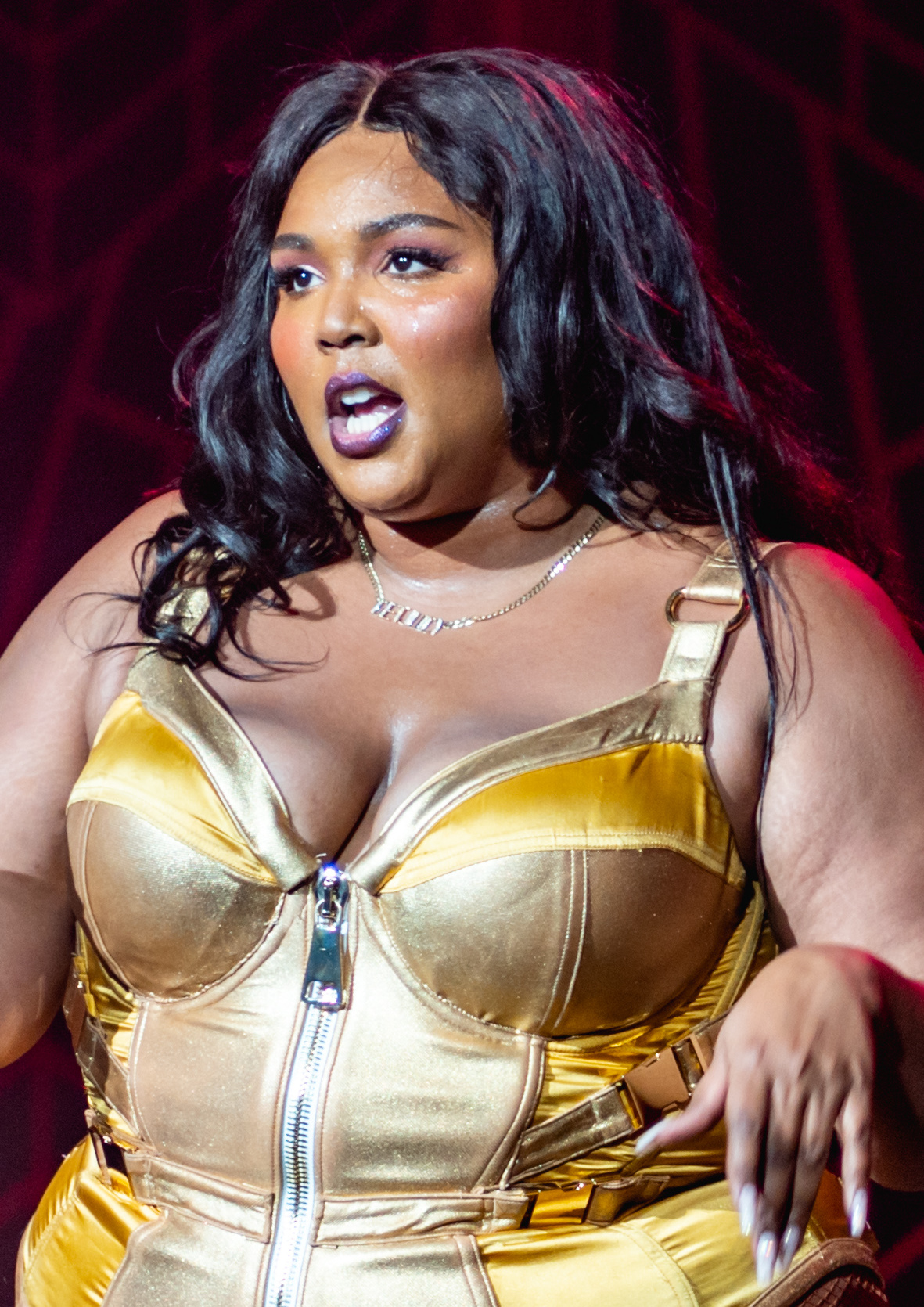
- Lizzo performing at the Brixton Academy in November 2019
- Studio albums: 5
- EPs: 3
- Singles: 35
- Music videos: 29
- Promotional singles: 2
- Mixtapes: 3

American rapper and singer Lizzo has released five studio albums, three mixtapes, three extended plays, 35 singles, and two promotional singles. Before signing with Atlantic Records, she released two albums—Lizzobangers in 2013 and Big Grrrl Small World in 2015. In 2014, Time magazine named her one of 14 music artists to watch. Her first major-label extended play, Coconut Oil, was released in 2016.

In 2019, she achieved breakthrough success with her third album, Cuz I Love You. That year, after being featured in the Netflix film Someone Great, her 2017 single "Truth Hurts" became a viral sleeper hit, reaching number 1 on the Billboard Hot 100 two years after its initial release. The song stayed atop the chart for seven weeks and has been certified Diamond by the Recording Industry Association of America. Later that year, Lizzo's 2016 single "Good as Hell" also became a sleeper hit and received a new remixed version featuring American singer Ariana Grande, the song later reached number 3 on the Hot 100 and has been certified four-times Platinum by the Recording Industry Association of America.

After struggling with body issues from an early age, Lizzo became an advocate for body positivity and self-love. Many of her songs reference or feature that theme.

== Albums ==
=== Studio albums ===
List of studio albums, with selected chart positions and certifications
Title	Details	Peak chart positions										Certifications
Title	Details	US	AUS	BEL (FL)	CAN	IRE	NLD	NZ	SCO	SWI	UK	Certifications
Lizzobangers	Released: October 15, 2013; Label: Totally Gross National Product, Virgin (2014 re-release); Formats: CD, LP, digital download, streaming	—	—	—	—	—	—	—	—	—	—	
Big Grrrl Small World	Released: December 11, 2015; Label: BGSW; Formats: CD, LP, digital download	—	—	—	—	—	—	—	—	—	—	
Cuz I Love You	Released: April 19, 2019; Label: Nice Life, Atlantic; Formats: CD, LP, digital download, streaming	4	19	42	7	44	68	31	46	75	30	RIAA: Platinum; BPI: Gold; MC: 2× Platinum; RMNZ: Platinum
Special	Released: July 15, 2022; Label: Nice Life, Atlantic; Formats: CD, LP, cassette, digital download, streaming	2	2	17	3	11	13	3	11	14	6	BPI: Silver; MC: Platinum; RMNZ: Platinum
Bitch	Released: June 5, 2026; Label: Nice Life, Atlantic; Formats: Digital download, streaming	— (Note: Bitch did not enter the Billboard 200, but peaked at number 46 on the Top Album Sales chart.)	—	—	—	—	—	—	—	—	— (Note: Bitch did not enter the UK Albums Chart, but peaked at number 83 on the UK Albums Downloads Chart.)	
"—" denotes a recording that did not chart or was not released in that territory.

=== Mixtapes ===
List of mixtapes
Title	Details
Due Process & Product (with Johnny Lewis)	Released: 2012; Label: Independent; Formats: Streaming
We Are the Chalice (with Sophia Eris and Claire de Lune)	Released: 2012; Label: Independent; Formats: Digital download, streaming
My Face Hurts from Smiling	Release date: June 27, 2025; Label: Atlantic; Formats: Digital download, streaming

== Extended plays ==
List of EPs, with selected chart positions and certifications
Title	Details	Peak chart positions				Certifications
Title	Details	US	US R&B /HH	US R&B	CAN	Certifications
Grrrl Prty X Bionik	Released: 2015; Label: BGSW; Formats: Digital download, streaming	—	—	—	—	
Coconut Oil	Released: October 7, 2016; Label: Nice Life, Atlantic; Formats: CD, digital download, streaming, LP	31	21	4	30	RMNZ: Gold
You're Special, Love Lizzo	Released: November 25, 2022; Label: Warner, X5; Formats: Digital download, streaming	—	—	—	—	
"—" denotes a recording that did not chart or was not released in that territory.

== Singles ==
=== As lead artist ===
List of singles as lead artist, with selected chart positions and certifications, showing year released and album name
Title	Year	Peak chart positions										Certifications	Album
Title	Year	US	US R&B/ HH	AUS	BEL (FL)	CAN	IRE	NLD	NZ	SWI	UK	Certifications	Album
"Batches and Cookies" (featuring Sophia Eris)	2013	—	—	—	—	—	—	—	—	—	—		Lizzobangers
"Wegula" (as Grrrl Prty)	2013	—	—	—	—	—	—	—	—	—	—		Non-album singles
"Night Watch" (as Grrrl Prty)	2013	—	—	—	—	—	—	—	—	—	—		Non-album singles
"Let 'Em Say" (with Caroline Smith)	2014	—	—	—	—	—	—	—	—	—	—		Broad City: Original Series Soundtrack
"Paris"	2014	—	—	—	—	—	—	—	—	—	—		Lizzobangers
"Faded"	2014	—	—	—	—	—	—	—	—	—	—		Lizzobangers
"Humanize"	2015	—	—	—	—	—	—	—	—	—	—		Big Grrrl Small World
"Ain't I"	2015	—	—	—	—	—	—	—	—	—	—		Big Grrrl Small World
"My Skin"	2015	—	—	—	—	—	—	—	—	—	—		Big Grrrl Small World
"Never Felt Like Christmas"	2015	—	—	—	—	—	—	—	—	—	—		Non-album singles
"Basement Queens" (with Sad13)	2016	—	—	—	—	—	—	—	—	—	—		Non-album singles
"Good as Hell" (solo or featuring Ariana Grande) (Note: "Good as Hell" also appears as a bonus track on the super deluxe edition of Cuz I Love You.)	2016	3	1	6	7	10	22	50	10	39	7	RIAA: 5× Platinum; ARIA: 6× Platinum; BPI: 2× Platinum; BRMA: Gold; MC: 8× Platinum; RMNZ: 4× Platinum	Coconut Oil
"Phone"	2016	—	—	—	—	—	—	—	—	—	—		Coconut Oil
"Water Me" (Note: "Water Me" appears on the deluxe edition of Cuz I Love You.)	2017	— (Note: "Water Me" did not enter the Billboard Hot 100, but peaked at number 19 on the Digital Song Sales chart.)	— (Note: "Water Me" did not enter the Hot R&B/Hip-Hop Songs, but peaked at number 4 on the R&B/Hip-Hop Digital Song Sales chart.)	—	—	—	—	—	—	—	—		Cuz I Love You
"Truth Hurts" (Note: "Truth Hurts" appears on the deluxe edition of Cuz I Love You.)	2017	1	1	15	50	7	14	78	5	94	29	RIAA: Diamond; ARIA: 3× Platinum; BPI: Platinum; MC: 9× Platinum; NVPI: Gold; RMNZ: 4× Platinum	Cuz I Love You
"Fitness"	2018	—	—	—	—	—	—	—	—	—	—		Non-album single
"Boys" (Note: "Boys" appears on the deluxe edition of Cuz I Love You.)	2018	— (Note: "Boys" did not enter the Billboard Hot 100, but peaked at number 19 on the Bubbling Under Hot 100 chart.)	— (Note: "Boys" did not enter the Hot R&B/Hip-Hop Songs, but peaked at number 4 on the Bubbling Under Hot R&B/Hip-Hop Songs chart.)	—	—	89	89	—	—	—	—	RIAA: Platinum; ARIA: Platinum; BPI: Silver; MC: 2× Platinum; RMNZ: Gold	Cuz I Love You
"Juice"	2019	82	26	100	— (Note: "Juice" did not enter the Flanders Ultratop 50, but peaked at number five on the Ultratip chart.)	86	51	— (Note: "Juice" did not enter the Single Top 100, but peaked at number 25 on the Dutch Single Tip chart.)	—	— (Note: "Juice" did not enter the Swiss Singles chart, but charted at number 61 on the Swiss Airplay chart.)	38	RIAA: 2× Platinum; ARIA: 5× Platinum; BPI: Platinum; MC: 3× Platinum; RMNZ: 2× Platinum	Cuz I Love You
"Tempo" (featuring Missy Elliott)	2019	— (Note: "Tempo" did not enter the Billboard Hot 100, but peaked at number eight on the Bubbling Under Hot 100 chart.)	48	—	—	—	—	—	—	—	—	RIAA: Platinum; MC: Gold; RMNZ: Gold	Cuz I Love You
"Cuz I Love You"	2020	— (Note: "Cuz I Love You" did not enter the Billboard Hot 100, but peaked at number 14 on the Bubbling Under Hot 100 chart.)	— (Note: "Cuz I Love You" did not enter the Billboard Hot R&B/Hip-Hop Songs, but peaked at number 14 on the R&B/Hip-Hop Digital Song Sales chart.)	—	— (Note: "Cuz I Love You" did not enter the Flanders Ultratop 50, but peaked at number 27 on the Ultratip chart.)	—	—	—	—	—	— (Note: "Cuz I Love You" did not enter the UK Singles Chart, but peaked at number 59 on the UK Singles Sales Chart.)	RIAA: Gold; MC: Gold	Cuz I Love You
"Rumors" (featuring Cardi B)	2021	4	1	16	41	12	16	— (Note: "Rumors" did not enter the Single Top 100, but peaked at number 6 on the Dutch Single Tip chart.)	23	85	20	RIAA: Platinum; ARIA: Gold; BPI: Silver; MC: Platinum; RMNZ: Gold	Non-album single
"About Damn Time"	2022	1	1	3	2	2	3	17	3	13	3	RIAA: 2× Platinum; ARIA: Platinum; BPI: 2× Platinum; IFPI SWI: Platinum; MC: 6× Platinum; RMNZ: 3× Platinum	Special
"2 Be Loved (Am I Ready)"	2022	55	—	11	23	25	14	— (Note: "2 Be Loved (Am I Ready)" did not enter the Single Top 100, but peaked at number 13 on the Dutch Single Tip chart.)	27	— (Note: "2 Be Loved (Am I Ready)" did not enter the Swiss Singles chart, but charted at number 80 on the Swiss Airplay chart.)	16	BPI: Platinum; IFPI SWI: Gold; MC: 2× Platinum; RMNZ: 2× Platinum	Special
"Someday at Christmas" (Amazon Original)	2022	59	18	—	—	2	—	—	—	—	8	BPI: Silver	Non-album single
"Special" (solo or featuring SZA)	2023	52	18	—	—	72	67	— (Note: "Special" did not enter the Single Top 100, but peaked at number 20 on the Dutch Single Tip chart.)	— (Note: "Special" did not enter the NZ Top 40 Singles Chart, but peaked at number 11 on the NZ Hot Singles Chart.)	—	66		Special
"Love in Real Life"	2025	—	—	—	—	—	—	—	— (Note: "Love in Real Life" did not enter the NZ Top 40 Singles Chart, but peaked at number 20 on the NZ Hot Singles Chart.)	—	—		Non-album singles
"Still Bad"	2025	— (Note: "Still Bad" did not enter the Billboard Hot 100, but peaked at number 11 on the Digital Song Sales chart.)	—	— (Note: "Still Bad" did not enter the Australian ARIA Singles Chart but peaked at number 40 on the ARIA Digital Track Chart.)	—	100	—	—	— (Note: "Still Bad" did not enter the NZ Top 40 Singles Chart, but peaked at number 35 on the NZ Hot Singles Chart.)	—	—		Non-album singles
"Don't Make Me Love U"	2026	—	—	—	—	—	—	—	—	—	—		Bitch
"Bitch"	2026	—	—	—	—	—	—	—	—	—	—		Bitch
"Hoes" (featuring Sexyy Red)	2026	—	—	—	—	—	—	—	—	—	—		Scary Movie
"Sexy Ladies" (featuring UCB)	2026	—	—	—	—	—	—	—	—	—	—		Bitch
"—" denotes a recording that did not chart or was not released in that territory.

=== As featured artist ===
List of singles as featured artist, with selected chart positions and certifications, showing year released and album name
Title	Year	Peak chart positions						Album
Title	Year	BEL (WA) Tip	CHN	CZ	IRE	NZ Hot	UK	Album
"Iko" (N.A.S.A. featuring Lizzo)	2015	—	—	—	—	—	—	Non-album singles
"Hands Up Don't Shoot!" (N.A.S.A. featuring Sean Paul and Lizzo)	2015	—	—	—	—	—	—	Non-album singles
"Blame It on Your Love" (Charli XCX featuring Lizzo)	2019	27	37	16	67	16	69	Charli
"—" denotes a recording that did not chart or was not released in that territory.

=== Promotional singles ===
List of promotional singles, with selected chart positions, showing year released and album name
Title	Year	Peak chart positions		Album
Title	Year	US Dig.	NZ Hot	Album
"Stayin' Alive" (Featured in Happy Death Day 2U)	2019	—	—	Non-album single
"Grrrls"	2022	39	16	Special
"—" denotes a recording that did not chart or was not released in that territory.

== Other charted and certified songs ==
List of non-single songs that have charted and/or been certified, showing year released and album name
Title	Year	Peak chart positions									Certifications	Album
Title	Year	US	US R&B/ HH	AUS	BEL (FL) Urban	CAN	IRE	NZ Hot	UK	WW	Certifications	Album
"Like a Girl"	2019	—	—	—	—	—	—	—	—	—	RIAA: Gold; MC: Gold	Cuz I Love You
"Soulmate"	2019	—	—	—	29	—	—	—	—	—	RIAA: Gold; MC: Gold	Cuz I Love You
"The Sign"	2022	—	—	—	—	—	—	15	—	—		Special
"I Love You Bitch"	2022	—	—	—	—	—	—	25	—	—		Special
"Pink"	2023	— (Note: "Pink" did not enter the Billboard Hot 100 but peaked at number 6 on the Bubbling Under Hot 100 chart.)	—	86	—	89	36	—	27	156	BPI: Silver	Barbie the Album
"What's Goin On" (Cardi B featuring Lizzo)	2025	63	15	—	—	—	—	—	—	—		Am I the Drama?
"—" denotes a recording that did not chart or was not released in that territory.

== Music videos ==
List of music videos, showing year released and directors
Title	Year	Director(s)
"Batches & Cookies" (featuring Sophia Eris)	2013	KRON
"Faded"	2014	KRON
"Bus Passes and Happy Meals"	2014	Annette Navarro
"Let 'Em Say" (with Caroline Smith)	2014	KRON
"Paris"	2014	Unknown
"My Skin"	2015	Quinn Wilson, Asha Efia & Lizzo
"Humanize"	2016	Quinn Wilson, Asha Efia & Lizzo
"Good as Hell" (version 1)	2016	Unknown
"Phone"	2016	Unknown
"Scuse Me"	2017	Blaque Roommate & Asha Efia
"Water Me"	2017	Quinn Wilson, Asha Efia & Andy Madeleine
"Truth Hurts"	2017	Quinn Wilson
"Fitness"	2018	Quinn Wilson
"Boys"	2018	Quinn Wilson & Andy Madeleine
"Juice"	2019	Quinn Wilson
"Cuz I Love You"	2019	Quinn Wilson
"Tempo" (featuring Missy Elliott)	2019	Andy Hines
"Good as Hell" (version 2)	2019	Alan Ferguson
"Rumors" (featuring Cardi B)	2021	Tanu Muino
"About Damn Time"	2022	Christian Breslauer
"2 Be Loved (Am I Ready)"	2022	Lizzo & Christian Breslauer
"Special"	2023	Christian Breslauer
"Love in Real Life"	2025	Colin Tilley
"Still Bad"	2025	Colin Tilley
"Still Bad (Animal Style)"	2025	B.K. Barone
"Don't Make Me Love U"	2026	Tanner K Williams
"BITCH"	2026	child.
"HOES" (featuring Sexyy Red)	2026	B.K. Barone
"Sexy Ladies"	2026	B.K. Barone

== Guest appearances ==
Title	Year	Other artist(s)	Album
"Give It to Mikey"	2012	Mike Mictlan	Snaxxx
"I Still Love H.E.R."	2012	Greg Grease	Cornbread, Pearl & G
"Eight"	2012	Big Cats!	For My Mother
"Homegirls"	2013	Crunchy Kids	—N/a
"Couldn't Breathe"	2013	Botzy	Buck Fotzy
"Be a Man"	2013	Buddakao	Save a Place for Me
"What We Do"	2013	Buddakao	Save a Place for Me
"Anyway"	2013	Buddakao	Save a Place for Me
"Keep Diggin'"	2013	Mixed Blood Majority	—N/a
"They Can't Come"	2013	P.O.S	WDELH/MDS/RMX
"Piano Hits"	2013	P.O.S	WDELH/MDS/RMX
"Cold Shoulder"	2014	Sean Anonymous & DJ Name	—N/a
"New Eyes"	2014	Clean Bandit	New Eyes
"Boytrouble"	2014	Prince and 3rdeyegirl	Plectrumelectrum
"Torn Apart"	2014	Bastille, GRADES	Vs. (Other People's Heartache, Pt. III)
"Big Bang"	2015	Sean Anonymous & Dimitry Killstorm	Better Days
"Boiled Peanuts"	2016	Astronautalis	Cut the Body Loose
"YDLM"	2016	The Griswolds	High Times for Low Lives
"Puffer" (Lazerbeak Remix)	2016	Speedy Ortiz	Foiled Again
"Sleepdrone/Superposition"	2017	P.O.S	Chill, Dummy
"Karaoke"	2018	Big Freedia	3rd Ward Bounce
"Errybody Say Love"	2018	RuPaul's Drag Race All Stars season 4 cast	—N/a
"Don't Funk It Up"	2018	RuPaul's Drag Race All Stars season 4 cast	—N/a
"A Change Is Gonna Come"	2020	—N/a	One World: Together at Home
"Pink"	2023	—N/a	Barbie the Album
"Pink (Bad Day)"	2023	—N/a	Barbie the Album
"Stairway to Heaven"	2023	Dolly Parton	Rockstar

== Songwriting credits ==
Title	Year	Artist(s)	Album
"F2F"	2022	SZA	SOS
