= Love in Real Life (song) =

Single by Lizzo
- Released: February 28, 2025
- Length: 2:34
- Label: Nice Life; Atlantic
- Songwriters: Ricky Reed; Melissa Jefferson; Blake Slatkin; Theron Makiel Thomas
- Producers: Blake Slatkin; Ricky Reed

Lizzo singles chronology
| "Special" (2023) | "Love in Real Life" (2025) | "Still Bad" (2025) |

Music video
- "Love in Real Life" on YouTube

"Love in Real Life" is a song by American singer and rapper Lizzo, released February 28, 2025, through Nice Life Recording Company and Atlantic Records. Produced by Blake Slatkin and Ricky Reed, the rock-influenced pop song was Lizzo's first solo release since "Pink" on Barbie the Album.

The song was initially released as the lead single and title track from her upcoming fifth studio album, subsequently replaced in 2026 by "Don't Make Me Love U" for the retitled album Bitch.

== Background and release ==
In 2023, several of Lizzo's former employees accused her of sexual harassment in the workplace. Lizzo said that the accusations and accompanying lawsuit "taught [her] about healthy boundaries... a difference between having boundaries and professional boundaries."

In February 2025, Lizzo began teasing a new album and accompanying singles by bidding goodbye to her previous album, Special. Additionally, the artist held a Twitch stream on Valentine's Day that same month teasing new music.

== In popular culture ==
This song appears in the trailer for the 2025 film Zootopia 2, as well as the third episode of Rupaul's Drag Race season 18 in a lip-sync between queens Mandy Mango and Briar Blush.

== Music video ==
The music video for "Love in Real Life" was released the same day as the song itself. The video, directed by Colin Tilley, features Lizzo in a nightclub surrounded by patrons dancing and chasing her in a zombie-like manner. Nicole Fell from The Hollywood Reporter compared the music video to Michael Jackson's video for "Thriller."

== Track listing ==
Digital single

1. "Everything Was So Much Simpler..." - 0:22
2. "Love in Real Life" - 2:34

== Charts ==
Chart performance for "Love in Real Life"
| Chart (2025) | Peak position |
|---|---|
| New Zealand Hot Singles (RMNZ) | 20 |
