= Don't Make Me Love U =

Single by Lizzo

from the album Bitch
- Released: March 20, 2026
- Length: 3:25
- Label: Nice Life; Atlantic
- Songwriters: Melissa Jefferson; Eric Frederic; Cheche Alara; Desmond Child; Sam Nelson Harris; Jon Bon Jovi; Richard Sambora; Holly Knight; Mike Chapman
- Producers: Lizzo; Ricky Reed; Cheche Alara

Lizzo singles chronology
"Still Bad" (2025)	"Don't Make Me Love U" (2026)	"Bitch" (2026)

Music video
- "Don't Make Me Love U" on YouTube

"Don't Make Me Love U" is a song by American singer and rapper Lizzo. It was released on March 20, 2026, through Nice Life and Atlantic Records, as the lead single from Lizzo's fifth studio album, Bitch (2026). Lizzo wrote the song with her long-time collaborator Eric Frederic, as well as Desmond Child and Cheche Alara, among others. The song's production was handled by Lizzo, Frederic, and Alara.

== Background and release ==
Lizzo announced the release of "Don't Make Me Love U" on her social media on March 18, 2026, with a clip that sees the singer twerking on her doppelgänger while the track plays in the background. Lizzo had previously performed the song on Saturday Night Live in April 2025, and sang an a-capella version of the track during an appearance on Late Night with Seth Meyers in February 2026. The track follows Lizzo's previously released singles "Still Bad" and "Love in Real Life", which were intended to be singles from her fifth studio album Bitch, before Lizzo pivoted away from the album's previous concept and instead released the stand-alone mixtape My Face Hurts from Smiling (2025).

== Critical reception ==
Upon the song's release, Brittany Spanos of The Guardian noted that the song and Lizzo's recent releases were being overshadowed by her 2023 misconduct lawsuit filed by three of her former backup dancers, and the harassment and discrimination lawsuit filed against the singer by fashion designer Asha Daniels. Spanos clarified that the lawsuit "unraveled the entire foundation of Lizzo’s brand" of the "radical and empowering" image she intended to promote, while claiming that the public don't know who Lizzo is anymore - hence the underperformance of her 2025 singles "Love in Real Life" and "Still Bad". Spanos described the music video for "Dont Make Me Love U" as being more "attention grabbing" than her other recent output, but that "it doesn’t seem like anyone is interested in what Lizzo has to say" as the video achieved less than half a million views in its first two weeks of release. Spanos concluded that Lizzo’s "main goal" right now is to "maintain" what she already lost, but "the climb back to the top may be further than she realizes".

== Music video ==
The music video for "Don't Make Me Love U" was released alongside the song on March 20, 2026, and was directed by Tanner K. Williams and shot by Bentley Rawle. According to Rachel DeSantis of People magazine, it sees Lizzo "giving her past self some love, featuring the singer and her alter ego Lizzy. One is her in the present day... and the other is her past self. They sit together at a dinner table and stand face to face before she eventually hugs her past self in a recreation of the cover art for her 2019 album Cuz I Love You."

== Live performances ==
On April 13, 2025, Lizzo performed "Don't Make Me Love U" for the first time on Saturday Night Live. On March 22, 2026, she performed the song on CBS Mornings. Following the release of the song's parent album Bitch, Lizzo performed the track on the Today Show on June 5.

== Charts ==
Weekly chart performance
Chart (2026)	Peak position
Croatia International Airplay (Top lista)	70
Italy Airplay (EarOne)	50
Latvia Airplay (TopHit)	37
San Marino Airplay (SMRTV Top 50)	45

== Release history ==
Release dates
Region	Date	Format(s)	Label	Ref.
Various	March 20, 2026	Digital download; streaming	Nice Life; Atlantic	
Italy	March 20, 2026	Radio airplay	Warner Music Group	
