= Bitch (album) =

Studio album by Lizzo
- Released: June 5, 2026
- Genres: Pop; R&B; hip-hop; synth-funk; soul
- Length: 35:44
- Labels: Nice Life; Atlantic
- Producers: Lizzo; Ricky Reed; Blake Slatkin; Pop Wansel; Cheche Alara; Cashmere Cat; Ben Darwish; Daoud; Tay Keith; Carter Lang; Billy Lemos; Nate Mercereau; Zack Sekoff; Dylan Wiggins

Lizzo chronology
My Face Hurts from Smiling (2025)	Bitch (2026)

Singles from Bitch
- 1. "Don't Make Me Love U" Released: March 20, 2026; 2. "Bitch" Released: May 1, 2026; 3. "Sexy Ladies" Released: June 12, 2026

Bitch (stylized as ~~BITCH~~) is the fifth studio album by American singer and rapper Lizzo. It was released through Nice Life Recording Company and Atlantic Records on June 5, 2026. Lizzo co-wrote and co-produced the album with long-time collaborator Ricky Reed, as well as Blake Slatkin, Pop Wansel, Cheche Alara, and Nate Mercereau, among others. The album incorporates sounds of R&B, hip-hop, pop, synth-funk, and soul, and lyrically explores Lizzo reclaiming who she is on her own terms, with themes of empowerment, vulnerability, and personal growth.

The album was preceded by the release of two singles; the lead single "Don't Make Me Love U", which was released on March 20, 2026, and the title track, which was released on May 1, 2026. Commercially, the album became Lizzo's first since Big Grrrl Small World (2015) to not chart on the US Billboard 200, moving 5,000 album-equivalent units in its first week. Upon release, Bitch was met with mixed reviews from music critics, who criticized a perceived lack of direction on the project and dated lyrical content, while some praise was offered to the production and its retro influences.

== Background ==
In a September 2025 interview with Vulture, Lizzo explained that she began writing songs for the album in 2022, and that the project was initially more "introspective". She described the album as being based on her experience of "feeling like the world has turned their back on you and then finding your way back into the world". The album was originally going to be titled Love in Real Life, with Lizzo releasing the 2025 singles "Love in Real Life" and "Still Bad" from the project, which both commercially underperformed compared to her label's expectations. Lizzo clarified that she later decided to adopt a more "energetic" tone for the project and take more creative control, explaining that she wanted to "subvert [the] expectation of [herself]" and wanted people to "rediscover who [she is] and fall in love with her again". Subsequently, she recorded seventeen songs in five days, which resulted in her mixtape My Face Hurts from Smiling (2025).

In April 2026, Lizzo explained in a press statement that she decided to rename the album to Bitch as this "takes a label once used to diminish women and [turns] it into a declaration of confidence, and unapologetic self-love". She also cited works by American rapper Missy Elliott and American singer-songwriter Meredith Brooks as further inspiration behind the title. On May 12, Lizzo posted a TikTok video where she claimed that social media algorithms are "destroying the music industry", blaming the lack of chronology in the way algorithms present information for making promoting her new album more challenging.

In an interview with USA Today in June, Lizzo stated that the album is about "reclaiming who [she is]" as "a lot of [her] identity has been manipulated by people outside of [her]". Expanding on the album's change in direction, she explained that "the world has changed a lot in the last few years" and that right now we are "in a time of conflict" and she is "fighting for herself", which is what the album represents.

== Composition ==
Bitch is primarily a pop, hip-hop and R&B album, with elements of G-funk, soul, synth-funk, rock, go-go music, and jazz. The album explores themes of empowerment, vulnerability, and personal growth, built around the central idea of Lizzo defining herself on her own terms and reclaiming who she is. During an appearance on Today in June 2026, Lizzo explained that the album's lyrical content comes from things she needed to express for herself, describing this as being shift from her earlier albums where she wrote songs mainly to uplift other people. She clarified that she still believes her personal experiences can resonate with and help people.

== Promotion ==
On February 26, 2026, Lizzo appeared on Late Night with Seth Meyers, where she sang an acapella version of "Don't Make Me Love U". Lizzo embarked on a three-date residency at the Blue Note Jazz Club in New York, between February 27 and March 1. During the residency, she performed the album's singles "Don't Make Me Love U" and "Bitch". On March 22, she performed "Don't Make Me Love U" on CBS Mornings.

On April 27, her birthday, Lizzo shared the album's title, cover art and release date of June 5, while announcing that the album was available for pre-order. In May, Lizzo appeared on The New York Times' Popcast series, and performed a live stripped-down set of her new material from the album. On the release day of Bitch, Lizzo appeared on Today's Citi Concert series, where she performed the album's title track, "Happy 2 Be", and "Don't Make Me Love U".

=== Singles ===
On March 20, 2026, Lizzo released the album's lead single "Don't Make Me Love U", alongside its music video directed by Tanner K. Williams. The track was produced by her long-time collaborator Ricky Reed, and Cheche Alara, and is a pop-ballad. It interpolates the keyboard line from Tina Turner's song "The Best" (1989), as well as the bassline from Bon Jovi's "Livin' on a Prayer" (1986). Lizzo debuted the song for the first time a year prior to its release, on Saturday Night Live in April 2025, where she performed it live. "Don't Make Me Love U" reached the top fifty on airplay charts in Italy, Latvia, and San Marino, while reaching number seventy on the airplay chart in Croatia.

On May 1, the second single from the album, the title track, was released, alongside its music video. The song interpolates Meredith Brooks' 1997 song of the same name. The lyrical content of the song finds Lizzo reclaiming her voice and narrative, with Lizzo herself comparing the song to Taylor Swift's re-recordings of her music. On June 12, "Sexy Ladies" featuring Uncalled 4 Band (UCB) was sent to Italian radio as the album's third single. It samples UCB's go-go song "Sexy Lady" (2004).

== Critical reception ==
Professional ratings
Aggregate scores
Source	Rating
AnyDecentMusic?	4.6/10
Metacritic	49/100
Review scores
Source	Rating
AllMusic	3/5 stars
The Arts Desk	2/5 stars
Beats Per Minute	6/10
Financial Times	2/5 stars
The Guardian	2/5 stars
The Independent	2/5 stars
MusicOMH	2.5/5 stars
Paste	C−
Rolling Stone	2.5/5 stars

According to the review aggregator Metacritic, Bitch received "mixed or average reviews" based on a weighted average score of 49 out of 100 from eight critic scores. The review aggregator site AnyDecentMusic? compiled ten reviews and gave Bitch an average of 4.6 out of 10, based on their assessment of the critical consensus.

Writing for Rolling Stone, Maura Johnston described Bitch as "tired and flat", unfavorably comparing the album to its predecessor, My Face Hurts from Smiling (2025). Johnston offered some praise to the track "Sexy Ladies" and its UCB interpolation, dubbing it a "triumphant song of the summer candidate", but wrote that the album's other callbacks to the past "fall flat". Alexis Petridis of The Guardian described the album as "disjointed" where Lizzo "tries a bit of everything", criticizing the interpolations on the album's singles, "Don't Make Me Love U" and the title track, as "flat" and "affectless". He praised "Whose Hair Is This" as a "great southern soul pastiche" and wrote that the old-school Chicago house bassline on "That Grrrl" had an "energising effect". Petridis concluded that Lizzo had once made music that "perfectly captured a zeitgeist" but had not yet worked out how to respond to the "changed world" we are now living in.

Roisin O'Connor of The Independent called the album "far from 100 percent" and "oddly frantic", writing that its title suggested a defiant tone while the songs were "strangely muted" and full of "cliched platitudes". Sam Shepherd of MusicOMH similarly found a disconnect between the album's title and content, describing Bitch as vulnerable rather than driven. He called "A Toast" "confused" and "self-pitying", but praised "Happy 2 Be" for "[picking] up the pace musically". Erin Lewis of The Arts Desk described the album as "deeply uninspired" and "a hollow repetition of much better songs", though she highlighted Lizzo's flute playing on "Too Nice" and the backing vocals on "Don't Make Me Love U".

Heather Phares of AllMusic highlighted "Don't Make Me Love U", "Sexy Ladies", "Whose Hair Is This" and "Happy 2 Be" as standouts from the album, but felt that the songs did not measure up to Lizzo's earlier hits and suggested that she was "trying to find her footing" on Bitch. Writing for Beats Per Minute, Mary Chiney suggested that Bitch is Lizzo "no longer trying to convince the room", but noted that "the record is the sound of someone who has not, quite, decided whether to trust that yet". In a review for Paste, Miranda Wollen described Bitch as being "obsessed with the self-righteous anger Lizzo clearly still carries against her naysayers", with "played-out tropes" and "icky filler invectives". She criticized the sample on the album's title track, and dubbed "Sexy Ladies" as "[recycling] yass-girl sentiments à la Katy Perry's 'Woman's World' over a thumping bass and a series of cringe-y lyrics [sic]". Wollen offered praise to "Whose Hair Is This", "Don't Make Me Love U", and "Little Black Cat", but described them as "just fine" and concluded that Lizzo's work needs to be "more thoughtful" and "more evolved" to be commercially well-received again.

== Commercial performance ==
In the United States, Bitch debuted at number 46 on the Billboard Top Album Sales and number 15 on the Indie Store Album Sales, with 5,000 album-equivalent units earned during its first week. It became Lizzo's first album since Big Grrrl Small World (2015) to not chart on the Billboard 200. In the United Kingdom, Bitch debuted at number 83 on the UK Album Downloads Chart, but missed the top one-hundred of the UK Albums Chart. Bitch attained its highest chart position in Hungary, where it reached number 15 on the Hungarian Physical Albums chart.

Jude Cramer of Fast Company noted the decrease in commercial success for the album relative to Lizzo's previous albums Special (2022) and Cuz I Love You (2019), suggesting that the singer's "foothold in pop culture seems to have slipped". In a post on X (formerly Twitter), Lizzo blamed the underperformance of the album on the changes in the music industry in the "last three years", explaining that "streaming replaced radio, and I was a radio darling. That's how my fan's [sic] discovered my music".

== Track listing ==
Bitch track listing
No.	Title	Lyrics	Music	Length
1.	"A Toast"	Melissa Jefferson; Eric Frederic; Nate Mercereau; Ben Darwish; Emily Warren	Lizzo; Ricky Reed; Mercereau; Darwish	2:40
2.	"Happy 2 Be"	Jefferson; Frederic; Cheche Alara; Theron Thomas	Lizzo; Reed; Alara	2:54
3.	"Don't Make Me Love U"	Jefferson; Alara; Desmond Child; Eric Frederic; Holly Knight; Jon Bon Jovi; Mike Chapman; Richie Sambora; Sam Nelson Harris	Lizzo; Reed; Alara	3:28
4.	"Bitch"	Meredith Brooks; Shelly Peiken	Reed; Blake Slatkin; Zack Sekoff	2:43
5.	"She Stole My Man"	Jefferson; Frederic; Alara; Andrew Wansel	Lizzo; Reed; Alara	2:47
6.	"Whose Hair Is This"	Jefferson; Frederic; Billy Lemos; Harris	Lizzo; Reed; Lemos	3:15
7.	"Little Black Cat"	Jefferson; Frederic; Wansel; Daoud Anthony	Lizzo; Reed; Pop Wansel; Daoud	3:22
8.	"Sexy Ladies" (featuring UCB)	Jefferson; Thomas; Brytavious Chambers; Frederic; Wansel; David Frank; Michael Austin Murphy; Eric Curry; Michael Bailey; Rashad Young; Walker Johnson III	Lizzo; Reed; Tay Keith; Pop Wansel	2:50
9.	"That Grrrl"	Jefferson; Frederic; Slatkin; Thomas; Mercereau; Dylan Wiggins; Adrian Wright; John William Callis; Phil Oakley	Lizzo; Reed; Slatkin; Mercereau; Wiggins	3:10
10.	"Too Nice"	Jefferson; Slatkin; Magnus Høiberg; Wansel; Leon Michels; Homer Steinweiss; Nick Movshon	Lizzo; Reed; Slatkin; Prophet Sound; Cashmere Cat	1:52
11.	"Like a Crime"	Jefferson; Carter Lang; Wansel	Lizzo; Reed; Lang; Pop Wansel	3:25
12.	"Goodmorning!"	Jefferson; Frederic; Slatkin; Thomas	Lizzo; Reed; Slatkin	3:18
Total length:				35:44

== Personnel ==
Credits are adapted from Tidal.

=== Musicians ===
- Lizzo – vocals (all tracks), background vocals (track 12)
- Ricky Reed – bass (2–5, 9, 12), programming (2, 4, 5, 9, 12), guitar (2, 12), synthesizer (3, 5, 9, 12), Prophet synthesizer (3, 4); drum programming, Juno synthesizer, Minimoog, tack piano (3); piano, strings (4); background vocals (12)
- Cheche Alara – synthesizer (2, 3, 5), piano (12)
- Blake Slatkin – programming (4, 12), background vocals (12)
- Zack Sekoff – programming, synthesizer (4)
- Mike Cordone – trumpet (4)
- Victor Indrizzo – drums (5, 12)
- Daoud Anthony – bass, glockenspiel, guitar, percussion, upright piano (7)
- Tay Keith – programming (8)
- UCB – featured vocals (8)
- Dylan Wiggins – synthesizer (9)
- Nate Mercereau – synthesizer (9)
- Carter Lang – bass, drums, guitar, organ, percussion, vibraphone (11)
- Theron Thomas – background vocals (12)

=== Technical ===
- Manny Marroquin – mixing
- Zach Pereyra – mastering
- Bill Malina – engineering (2–4, 7–9, 11, 12)
- Ethan Shumaker – engineering (3)
- Carter Lang – engineering (11)
- Ricky Reed – vocal engineering (2–4, 7–9, 12)
- Daniel Escobar – engineering assistance (2–4, 7–9, 11, 12)
- Jacob Dennis – engineering assistance (2–4, 7–9, 11, 12)
- Kyle McAulay – engineering assistance (2–4, 7–9, 11, 12)
- Bella Corich – engineering assistance (4, 9)
- Holden Woodward – engineering assistance (4, 9)
- Mark Aguilar – engineering assistance (4, 9)
- Porter Fratzke – engineering assistance (4, 9)
- William Maxwell – engineering assistance (4, 9)

== Charts ==
Chart performance
Chart (2026)	Peak position
Croatian International Albums (HDU)	23
Greek Albums (IFPI)	72
Hungarian Physical Albums (MAHASZ)	15
UK Album Downloads (Official Charts)	83
US Indie Store Album Sales (Billboard)	15
US Top Album Sales (Billboard)	46

== Release history ==
Region	Date	Format(s)	Label	Ref.
Various	June 5, 2026	CD; digital download; streaming; vinyl	Atlantic; Nice Life	
