= Special (Lizzo song) =

2023 single by Lizzo

- SZA remix cover

Single by Lizzo

from the album Special
- Released: January 13, 2023
- Genre: R&B
- Length: 2:54
- Label: Nice Life; Atlantic
- Songwriters: Melissa Jefferson; Theron Thomas; Max Martin; Andrew Wansel; Ian Kirkpatrick; Daoud Anthony
- Producers: Max Martin; Pop Wansel; Ian Kirkpatrick; Daoud Anthony

Lizzo singles chronology
"Someday at Christmas" (2022)	"Special" (2023)	"Love in Real Life" (2025)

SZA singles chronology
"Kill Bill" (2023)	"Special" (remix) (2023)	"Snooze" (2023)

Music video
- "Special" on YouTube

"Special" is a song by American singer and rapper Lizzo, and the title track of her fourth studio album, Special (2022). It was released to Italian contemporary hit radio on January 13, 2023, as the third single from the album. A remix featuring American singer-songwriter SZA was released on February 9, 2023. The song peaked at number 52 on the Billboard Hot 100 and became Lizzo's first and SZA's second song to top the Adult R&B Airplay chart. It also reached number 2 in Suriname and number 6 in San Marino.

== Live performances ==
Lizzo debuted the song on the forty-seventh season of Saturday Night Live on April 16, 2022, three months before its release. She performed the song on Today on July 15, 2022, the same day as the release of its parent album. Lizzo also performed the song during a December 2022 appearance on The Howard Stern Show. Lizzo further performed the song at the 65th Annual Grammy Awards, accompanied by a gospel choir. A few days later, she performed a medley of "Special" with "2 Be Loved (Am I Ready)" and "About Damn Time" at the Brit Awards 2023. The same month she played the song on BBC Radio 1's Live Lounge, alongside a cover of "Unholy" by Sam Smith and Kim Petras. She was brought out by SZA to perform "Special" together during the concert at the Grand National Tour in Inglewood, California, on May 21, 2025.

== Music video ==
Lizzo released the music video for "Special" on February 1, 2023. In the video, she portrays a "beleaguered and put-upon waitress" who is secretly a superhero at night.

== Charts ==
=== Weekly charts ===
Weekly chart performance for "Special"
Chart (2022–2023)	Peak position
Canada Hot 100 (Billboard)	72
Canada AC (Billboard)	17
Canada Hot AC (Billboard)	22
Canada CHR/Top 40 (Billboard)	23
Global 200 (Billboard)	105
Ireland (IRMA)	67
Japan Hot Overseas (Billboard Japan)	14
Latvia Airplay (LaIPA)	6
Netherlands (Single Tip)	20
New Zealand Hot Singles (RMNZ)	11
San Marino (SMRRTV Top 50)	6
South Korea Download (Circle)	159
Suriname (Nationale Top 40)	2
Sweden Heatseeker (Sverigetopplistan)	3
UK Singles (Official Charts)	66
US Billboard Hot 100	52
US Adult Contemporary (Billboard)	26
US Adult Pop Airplay (Billboard)	15
US Hot R&B/Hip-Hop Songs (Billboard)	18
US R&B/Hip-Hop Airplay (Billboard)	16
US Pop Airplay (Billboard)	15
US Rhythmic Airplay (Billboard)	10

=== Year-end charts ===
Year-end chart performance for "Special"
Chart (2023)	Position
US Hot R&B/Hip-Hop Songs (Billboard)	69
US Mainstream Top 40 (Billboard)	49
US R&B/Hip-Hop Airplay (Billboard)	46

== Release history ==
Release dates and formats for "Special"
Region	Date	Format(s)	Version	Label	Ref.
Italy	January 13, 2023	Contemporary hit radio	Original	Nice Life; Atlantic	
Various	February 9, 2023	Digital download; streaming	SZA remix	Nice Life; Atlantic	
United States	February 14, 2023	Contemporary hit radio; rhythmic contemporary radio	SZA remix	Nice Life; Atlantic	
Various	February 24, 2023	Digital download; streaming	Sped Up SZA Remix	Nice Life; Atlantic	
