= 2 Be Loved (Am I Ready) =

2022 single by Lizzo

- Pnau remix cover

Single by Lizzo

from the album Special
- Released: July 18, 2022
- Genre: Pop; disco; synth-pop
- Length: 3:07
- Label: Nice Life; Atlantic
- Songwriters: Melissa Jefferson; Savan Kotecha; Peter Svensson; Max Martin; Ilya Salmanzadeh
- Producers: Martin; Salmanzadeh

Lizzo singles chronology
"About Damn Time" (2022)	"2 Be Loved (Am I Ready)" (2022)	"Someday at Christmas" (2022)

Music video
- "2 Be Loved (Am I Ready)" on YouTube

"2 Be Loved (Am I Ready)" is a song by American singer and rapper Lizzo, from her fourth studio album Special (2022). It was released to Italian radio on July 18, 2022, as the album's second single, while in the United States, it impacted hot adult contemporary radio on August 1, 2022, as well as rhythmic contemporary radio and contemporary hit radio the following day. "2 Be Loved (Am I Ready) is a "new wave-ish" pop song, inspired by 70's disco and 80's synth-pop, and has been compared to works by the Pointer Sisters and Hall & Oates. Commercially, the song reached the top twenty in Australia, Croatia, Iceland, Ireland, the Netherlands, San Marino, the United Kingdom, and Wallonia.

== Live performances ==
Lizzo performed the song for the first time on Today on July 15, 2022. She performed the song in a medley with previous single "About Damn Time" at the 2022 MTV Video Music Awards. She performed a medley with "Special", "2 Be Loved", and "About Damn Time" at the Brit Awards 2023.

== Music video ==
To promote "2 Be Loved", a music video for the song premiered on August 15, 2022, and was co-directed by Lizzo, along with Christian Breslauer, who also directed her video for "About Damn Time". According to Tomás Mier of Rolling Stone, the video "opens with Lizzo walking down the aisle, recreating the scene from her “Truth Hurts” visual before she second-guesses the idea of marrying herself. The singer then ditches the ceremony altogether, to the surprise of the attendees. Lizzo drives away in a red car before pulling to the side of the road and seeing a beautiful man in a motorcycle. The two hug and share a sweet moment before Lizzo leans for a kiss — but it turns out the guy was an illusion all along, and she was just making out with a tree. After her would-be bridesmaids film the silly moment of her kissing a tree, the video transitions to Lizzo celebrating her freedom and singlehood in a silver outfit, showing off her best twerk moves alongside her besties".

== Commercial performance ==
In the United States, "2 Be Loved" peaked at number 55 on the Billboard Hot 100, and number 13 on the Pop Airplay chart, becoming the second of three top 15 entries on the latter from Special, following "About Damn Time" and preceding the album's third single and title track. Elsewhere, the song reached number 11 in Australia, number 25 in Canada, and number 16 in the United Kingdom.

In Europe, the song reached the top forty in multiple countries, including number 36 in France, number 13 in the Netherlands, and number 4 in Croatia. Additionally, "2 Be Loved" has earned several Gold and Platinum certifications since its release, including a Platinum certification in the United Kingdom for moving 600,000 units, a Platinum certification in France for moving 200,000 units, and a double Platinum certification in Canada for moving 160,000 units.

== Charts ==
=== Weekly charts ===
Weekly chart performance for "2 Be Loved (Am I Ready)"
Chart (2022–2023)	Peak position
Australia (ARIA)	11
Belgium (Ultratop 50 Flanders)	23
Belgium (Ultratop 50 Wallonia)	2
Canada Hot 100 (Billboard)	25
Canada AC (Billboard)	13
Canada CHR/Top 40 (Billboard)	5
Canada Hot AC (Billboard)	20
Croatia (HRT)	4
Global 200 (Billboard)	101
Finland Airplay (Radiosoittolista)	42
France (SNEP)	36
Iceland (Tónlistinn)	26
Ireland (IRMA)	14
Japan Hot Overseas (Billboard Japan)	19
Netherlands (Single Tip)	13
New Zealand (Recorded Music NZ)	27
San Marino (SMRRTV Top 50)	3
Sweden (Sverigetopplistan)	72
Switzerland Airplay (Hitparade)	92
UK Singles (Official Charts)	16
US Billboard Hot 100	55
US Adult Contemporary (Billboard)	27
US Adult Pop Airplay (Billboard)	15
US Dance Airplay (Billboard)	38
US Pop Airplay (Billboard)	13

=== Year-end charts ===
2022 year-end chart performance for "2 Be Loved (Am I Ready)"
Chart (2022)	Position
Australia (ARIA)	99
Belgium (Ultratop Flanders)	115
Belgium (Ultratop Wallonia)	156
US Mainstream Top 40 (Billboard)	50

2023 year-end chart performance for "2 Be Loved (Am I Ready)"
Chart (2023)	Position
Belgium (Ultratop Wallonia)	40
France (SNEP)	111

== Certifications ==
Certifications for "2 Be Loved (Am I Ready)"
Region	Certification	Certified units/sales
Austria (IFPI Austria)	Gold	15,000^{‡}
Canada (Music Canada)	2× Platinum	160,000^{‡}
Denmark (IFPI Danmark)	Gold	45,000^{‡}
France (SNEP)	Platinum	200,000^{‡}
Italy (FIMI)	Gold	50,000^{‡}
New Zealand (RMNZ)	2× Platinum	60,000^{‡}
Switzerland (IFPI Switzerland)	Gold	10,000^{‡}
United Kingdom (BPI)	Platinum	600,000^{‡}
^{‡} Sales+streaming figures based on certification alone.

== Release history ==
Release dates and formats for "2 Be Loved (Am I Ready)"
Region	Date	Format(s)	Version	Label	Ref.
Italy	July 18, 2022	Contemporary hit radio	Original	Nice Life; Atlantic	
United States	August 1, 2022	Hot adult contemporary radio	Original	Nice Life; Atlantic	
United States	August 2, 2022	contemporary hit radio; rhythmic contemporary radio	Original	Nice Life; Atlantic	
Various	September 23, 2022	Digital download; streaming	Pnau remix	Nice Life; Atlantic	
