= Special (Lizzo album) =

- Standard cover

Studio album by Lizzo
- Released: July 15, 2022
- Recorded: September 2021 – March 2022
- Genres: Pop; funk; disco; hip-hop; R&B
- Length: 35:16
- Labels: Nice Life; Atlantic
- Producers: Ricky Reed; Blake Slatkin; Max Martin; Ilya; Pop Wansel; Benny Blanco; Peter Svensson; Emily Warren; Ian Kirkpatrick; Savan Kotecha; Phoelix; Nate Mercereau; Terrace Martin; Omer Fedi; Joseph McVey; Mike Dean; Daoud Anthony; Mark Ronson; Thomas Brenneck; Jon Bellion; Michael Pollack; Stefan Johnson; Jordan K. Johnson; Kid Harpoon; Quelle Chris

Lizzo chronology
| Cuz I Love You (2019) | Special (2022) | My Face Hurts from Smiling (2025) |

Singles from Special
- 1. "About Damn Time" Released: April 14, 2022; 2. "2 Be Loved (Am I Ready)" Released: July 18, 2022; 3. "Special" Released: January 13, 2023

Special is the fourth studio album by American singer and rapper Lizzo, released by Nice Life Recording Company and Atlantic Records on July 15, 2022. It was preceded by the lead single "About Damn Time", released on April 14, 2022, which reached number one on the Billboard Hot 100, and the top ten in 12 other countries.

Special, has been described by critics as a pop, funk, disco, hip-hop, and R&B album. It received positive reviews from music critics. The album peaked at number two on the US Billboard 200 chart, becoming, at the time, the highest-charting album by a female artist in 2022, as well as the largest week by units earned, among all albums released by women in 2022. It reached the top ten on the UK, Australian, Canadian, Hungary, and New Zealand album charts.

At the 65th Annual Grammy Awards, the album received nominations for Album of the Year and Best Pop Vocal Album, while "About Damn Time" won Record of the Year, with additional nominations for Song of the Year and Best Pop Solo Performance.

== Background ==
Lizzo released her third studio album and major-label debut studio album, Cuz I Love You, on April 19, 2019. The album was met with positive reviews and peaked at number two on the Billboard 200 chart. The album was nominated for Album of the Year at the 62nd Annual Grammy Awards, contributing to Lizzo receiving the most nominations at the ceremony. The album also won the award for Best Urban Contemporary Album.

In October 2020, Lizzo announced that her fourth studio album was nearing completion, saying she had "a few more songs to write". In January 2021, American singer SZA confirmed to have heard new material from Lizzo. In August 2021, Lizzo announced "Rumors", her first song after two years, which was released on August 13. The standalone single features fellow American rapper Cardi B.

During her keynote speech at the South by Southwest festival in March 2022, Lizzo announced that her album was finished, saying "It's done so it's coming very very soon…and it's good. I worked real hard on it, so it better be good."

== Production and recording ==
Recording for "Special" began in 2018, but the tracks that made up the album only started to be recorded in September 2021 and was finished by March 2022.

In an interview with Zane Lowe for Apple Music 1 in April 2022, Lizzo explained that the album was originally titled In Case Nobody Told You until Max Martin helped her "restructure" the hook of the song "Special", which she then changed the title of the album to.

In another interview with Zane Lowe on Apple Music 1 in July 2022, Lizzo talked about the origins of the track "Coldplay", with Coldplay lead singer Chris Martin briefly appearing in the interview as well. The track features a monologue by Lizzo where she talks about a recent vacation in which she "was with somebody, and I was just looking at the stars. And I was with him, and I was singing ["Yellow"]."

== Promotion ==
On March 21, 2022, Lizzo previewed the single "About Damn Time" on The Late Late Show with James Corden, with a release date of April 14. Shortly after the release of the song and its accompanying music video, Lizzo formally announced Special, with a release date of July 15.

On July 6, Lizzo revealed the track list of Special on her Instagram account by showing the back cover of its vinyl packaging.

=== Singles ===
"About Damn Time" was released on April 14, 2022, as the lead single of the album. The song was a commercial success, peaking at the top of the Billboard Hot 100 in the US as well as reaching the top three in seven other countries.

On July 18, 2022, "2 Be Loved (Am I Ready)" was released to Italian radio as the album's second single. In the United States, the song impacted hot adult contemporary radio on August 1, 2022, and contemporary hit radio, as well as rhythmic contemporary radio on August 2, 2022.

The title track was released on January 13, 2023, as the album's third single. While "Special" was rumored to have a remix featuring American singer SZA dating back to November 2022, it was finally confirmed by Lizzo on her social media accounts when she announced the official remix. The remix featuring SZA was released on February 9, 2023.

==== Promotional singles ====
"Grrrls" was released on June 10, 2022, as the album's first promotional single. The song samples from the song "Girls" by the Beastie Boys.

The song earned controversy for its use of the word "spaz" in its lyrics "I'm a spaz / I'm about to knock somebody out". As Australian disability advocate Hannah Diviney pointed out, the word is an ableist slur, and other fans agreed. Some internet users claimed that "spaz" is used differently in African-American Vernacular English and is synonymous with "freaking out," but disability organizations in the UK and the US have criticized its use. Shortly afterward, Lizzo issued an apology and released an updated version of the song, stating, "I never want to promote derogatory language." The updated song lyrics replace "I'm a spaz" with "Hold me back".

=== Tour ===
On April 25, 2022, Lizzo announced a full arena tour in support of the album, starting on September 23, 2022, in Sunrise, Florida and ending on June 2, 2023, in Thousand Palms, California. Latto opened for the tour.

== Critical reception ==
Professional ratings
Aggregate scores
| Source | Rating |
|---|---|
| AnyDecentMusic? | 7.1/10 |
| Metacritic | 78/100 |
Review scores
| Source | Rating |
| AllMusic | 4/5 stars |
| The Daily Telegraph | 4/5 stars |
| Evening Standard | 4/5 stars |
| The Guardian | 4/5 stars |
| The Independent | 5/5 stars |
| The Line of Best Fit | 6/10 |
| NME | 4/5 stars |
| Pitchfork | 6.4/10 |

Special received generally positive reviews from music critics upon its initial release. At Metacritic, which assigns a normalized rating out of 100 to reviews from mainstream critics, the album has an average score of 78, based on 16 reviews, indicating "generally favorable reviews".

Writing for Evening Standard David Smyth states that "This time she'll sweep an older generation into her gang too. Many of the biggest tunes channel Seventies disco and Eighties synthpop" and added "It's clear she isn't an outsider any more. This is her world, and we're lucky to live in it." In an article for The Independent, reviewer Helen Brown pointed that Special is overflowing with love and gratitude to friends, family, lovers and fans and added that [Lizzo's] rap flow has a terrific tensile strength and said that when singing, she delivers as both a belter and a breathy balladeer. Special is good as hell."

NME contributor Nick Levine gave the album four out of five stars, observing that "Lizzo's overwhelmingly positive message, Special is sometimes a bit cheesy," before concluding that "Lizzo knows exactly who she is as an artist and what she wants to achieve: she's the bad bitch with an incredible talent for making people feel good". In a more mixed reception of the album, Sam Franzini of The Line of Best Fit believed that for "most songs on Special, there is a rawer, more real iteration somewhere else in Lizzo's catalog," and that having the "glossiest pop sheen steamrolled over them, erasing any wrinkles or mishaps" removed "the exact thing that made [Lizzo's songs] endearing to begin with." PopMatters published two contrasting reviews of the album, with John Amen scoring the album 7/10 and commenting that "Special is as much a celebration of the Twitter, Instagram, and Facebook cosmos as it is an in-person, post-Covid bacchanal." while Nick Malone scored the album 4/10 and wrote that "Special is such a disappointment because you can hear the better album Lizzo is capable of making."

== Commercial performance ==
In the United States, Special debuted at number two on the US Billboard 200 chart, with 69,000 album-equivalent units sold in its first week, becoming Lizzo's highest-charting album to date. It was the highest-charting album by a female artist in 2022, as well as the largest week by units earned, among all albums released by women in 2022 until it was surpassed by Beyoncé's Renaissance and later by Taylor Swift's Midnights.

== Track listing ==
Special track listing
| No. | Title | Lyrics | Music | Producer(s) | Length |
|---|---|---|---|---|---|
| 1. | "The Sign" | Melissa Jefferson; Theron Thomas | Eric Frederic; Nate Mercereau; Michael Ball | Ricky Reed; Phoelix | 2:45 |
| 2. | "About Damn Time" | Jefferson; Thomas | Frederic; Blake Slatkin; Malcolm McLaren; Ronald Larkins; Larry Price; Stephen Hague | Reed; Slatkin; Terrace Martin^{[a]} | 3:11 |
| 3. | "Grrrls" | Jefferson; Thomas | Max Martin; Ilya Salmanzadeh; Benjamin Levin; Slatkin; Andrew Wansel; Adam Horovitz; Rick Rubin | Slatkin; Pop Wansel; M. Martin; ILYA; Benny Blanco | 2:01 |
| 4. | "2 Be Loved (Am I Ready)" | Jefferson | Peter Svensson; M. Martin; Savan Kotecha; Salmanzadeh | M. Martin; Kotecha; ILYA | 3:07 |
| 5. | "I Love You Bitch" | Jefferson | Mike Dean; Omer Fedi; Slatkin; Joseph McVey | Slatkin; Fedi | 2:28 |
| 6. | "Special" | Jefferson; Thomas | M. Martin; Wansel; Ian Kirkpatrick; Daoud Anthony | Wansel; Kirkpatrick; Daoud; M. Martin | 2:54 |
| 7. | "Break Up Twice" | Jefferson | Leon Michels; Mark Ronson; Thomas Brenneck; Nicholas Movshon; William Bell; Booker T. Jones; Lauryn Hill | Ronson; Reed^{[a]} | 2:56 |
| 8. | "Everybody's Gay" | Jefferson; Thomas | Frederic; Wansel; Kirkpatrick; James Johnson | Wansel; Kirkpatrick; Reed; Mercereau^{[a]} | 3:35 |
| 9. | "Naked" | Jefferson; Emily Warren | Kirkpatrick; Wansel; Anthony; Frederic; Robert "Kool" Bell; Ronald Bell; Claydes Charles Smith; Dennis Thomas; George Brown; Richard Westfield; Alton Taylor | Wansel; Kirkpatrick; Reed^{[c]} | 3:00 |
| 10. | "Birthday Girl" | Jefferson; Thomas | Jonathan Bellion; Michael Pollack; Stefan Johnson; Jordan Johnson | The Monsters and the Strangerz | 3:07 |
| 11. | "If You Love Me" | Jefferson; Amy Allen | Kid Harpoon; Mercereau | Kid Harpoon; Mercereau | 3:11 |
| 12. | "Coldplay" | Jefferson | Frederic; Mercereau; Gavin Tennille; Chris Martin; Guy Berryman; Jonny Buckland; Will Champion | Reed; Quelle Chris; Chris Keys | 2:55 |
| Total length: | | | | | 35:16 |

Holiday Edition
| No. | Title | Lyrics | Music | Length |
|---|---|---|---|---|
| 13. | "Someday at Christmas" (Amazon original) | Ron Miller; Bryan Wells | Henry Cosby | 2:58 |
| Total length: | | | | 38:14 |

Japanese bonus track
| No. | Title | Lyrics | Music | Length |
|---|---|---|---|---|
| 13. | "About Damn Time" (Purple Disco Machine remix) | Jefferson; Thomas | Frederic; Slatkin; McLaren; Larkins; Price; Hague | 3:39 |
| Total length: | | | | 38:55 |

Apple Music bonus track
| No. | Title | Writer(s) | Length |
|---|---|---|---|
| 13. | "A Very Special Message from Lizzo" | Jefferson | 1:39 |
| Total length: | | | 36:55 |

=== Notes ===
- ^{^[a]} signifies an additional producer
- ^{^[c]} signifies a co-producer
- "About Damn Time" samples the song "Hey DJ" performed by The World's Famous Supreme Team, as written by Malcolm McLaren, Ronald Larkins, Larry Price and Stephen Hague.
- "Grrrls" samples the song "Girls" performed by Beastie Boys, as written by Beastie Boys and Rick Rubin.
- "I Love You Bitch" samples the song "I Hate You Bitch" performed by Z-Ro, as written by Z-Ro and Mike Dean.
- "Break Up Twice" interpolates the song "Doo Wop (That Thing)", as written and performed by Lauryn Hill.
- "Naked" samples the song "Summer Madness" written and performed by Kool & The Gang.
- "Coldplay" samples the song "Yellow" performed by Coldplay, as written by Chris Martin, Guy Berryman, Jonny Buckland, and Will Champion; and "Sudden Death" performed and written by Quelle Chris & Chris Keys.

== Personnel ==
=== Musicians ===
- Lizzo – vocals (all tracks), flute (track 2)
- Phoelix – bass, programming (1)
- Thomas Pridgen – drums (1, 8)
- Nate Mercereau – electric guitar (1, 2, 8, 9, 11); acoustic guitar, bass, drums, piano (11)
- Lemar Guillary – horns arrangement, trombone (1, 6, 8)
- Ricky Reed – programming (1, 2, 6, 8, 9, 12), bass (2, 6, 8); additional vocals, horns arrangement, glockenspiel, guitar, synthesizer (2); instrumentation, keyboards (8, 9)
- Michael Cordone – trumpet (1, 2, 6, 8)
- Blake Slatkin – programming (2, 3), additional vocals (2); instrumentation, keyboards (3)
- Chawntá Van – additional vocals (2)
- Doshiniq Green – additional vocals (2)
- Myke Wright – additional vocals (2)
- Shelbeniece Swain – additional vocals (2)
- Victor Indrizzo – drums, percussion (2, 8)
- Jesse McGinty – saxophone, trombone (2)
- Terrace Martin – vocoder (2)
- Benny Blanco – instrumentation, keyboards, programming, vocals (3)
- Ilya – instrumentation (3), programming (3, 4); arrangement, background vocals, bass, drums, guitar (4); additional programming (6)
- Chris Keys – instrumentation (12)
- Max Martin – instrumentation (3, 6), programming (3, 4, 6); arrangement, background vocals, bass, drums, guitar (4)
- Rickard Göransson – bass, guitar (4)
- Peter Carlsson – drums, guitar (4)
- Pop Wansel – instrumentation, programming (3, 6, 8, 9); keyboards (6, 8, 9)
- Johan Carlsson – organ, piano (4)
- Jasper Harris – piano (5)
- Daoud – guitar (6, 9); instrumentation, keyboards, piano, programming, Rhodes solo, saxophone (6)
- Ian Kirkpatrick – instrumentation, keyboards, programming (6, 8, 9)
- Donald Hayes – saxophone (6, 8)
- Nick Movshon – bass (7)
- Larry Gold – conductor, string arrangement (7)
- Tommy Brenneck – guitar (7)
- Leon Michels – keyboards (7)
- Mark Ronson – keyboards, string arrangement (7)
- Ian Hendrickson-Smith – saxophone (7)
- Raymond J. Mason – trombone (7)
- Dave Guy – trumpet (7)
- Jonathan Kim – viola (7)
- Yoshihiko Nakano – viola (7)
- Blake Espy – violin (7)
- Chris Jusell – violin (7)
- Emma Kummrow – violin (7)
- Gared Crawford – violin (7)
- Luigi Mazzocchi – violin (7)
- Natasha Colkett – violin (7)
- Jerry Hey – horns arrangement (10)
- Jordan Johnson – instrumentation, keyboards, programming (10)
- Stefan Johnson – instrumentation, programming (10)
- Michael Pollack – keyboards (10)
- Dan Higgins – saxophone (10)
- Andy Martin – trombone (10)
- Wayne Bergeron – trumpet (10)
- Kid Harpoon – drum programming, Mellotron, pianosynthesizer (11)
- Quelle Chris – additional vocals (12)
- Jon Kubis – string arrangement (12)
- Ray Chew – string arrangement (12)
- Adrianne Woods – cello (12)
- Ryan Cross – cello (12)
- Chris Woods – viola (12)
- Jarvis Benson – viola (12)
- Jonah Sirota – viola (12)
- Leah Katz – viola (12)
- Charlie Bisharat – violin (12)
- Daphne Chen – violin (12)
- Jenny Takamatsu – violin (12)
- Marissa Kuney – violin (12)
- Melissa Reiner – violin (12)
- Radu Pieptea – violin (12)
- Richard Adkins – violin (12)
- Songa Lee – violin (12)

=== Technical ===
- Emerson Mancini – mastering
- Manny Marroquin – mixing (1, 2, 7–12)
- Serban Ghenea – mixing (3–6)
- Ricky Reed – mixing (7)
- Bill Malina – engineering (1, 2, 6, 8, 12)
- Patrick Kehrier – engineering (1–9, 12), engineering assistance (10, 11)
- Benny Blanco – engineering (3)
- Ilya – engineering (3)
- Damien Lewis – engineering (6, 8, 9)
- Ian Kirkpatrick – engineering (6, 8, 9)
- Jacob Ferguson – engineering (7)
- Jeff Chestek – engineering (7)
- Jens Jungkurth – engineering (7)
- Stefan Johnson – engineering (10)
- Jeremy Hatcher – engineering (11)
- Bryce Bordone – mix engineering (6), mixing assistance (3–5)
- Andrew Hey – horns engineering (10)
- Anthony Vilchis – mixing assistance (1, 2, 7–12)
- Trey Station – mixing assistance (1, 2, 7–12)
- Zach Pereyra – mixing assistance (1, 2, 7–12)
- Chad Gordon – engineering assistance (1)
- James Kirk – engineering assistance (2)
- Piéce Eatah – engineering assistance (2)
- Trey Pearce – engineering assistance (2)
- Nate Ramer – engineering assistance (11)
- Tom Peltier – engineering assistance (11)
- Ira Grylack – engineering assistance (12)

== Charts ==
=== Weekly charts ===
Weekly chart performance for Special
| Chart (2022–2023) | Peak position |
|---|---|
| Australian Albums (ARIA) | 2 |
| Austrian Albums (Ö3 Austria) | 17 |
| Belgian Albums (Ultratop Flanders) | 17 |
| Belgian Albums (Ultratop Wallonia) | 43 |
| Canadian Albums (Billboard) | 3 |
| Danish Albums (Hitlisten) | 27 |
| Dutch Albums (Album Top 100) | 13 |
| Finnish Albums (Suomen virallinen lista) | 36 |
| French Albums (SNEP) | 48 |
| German Albums (Offizielle Top 100) | 18 |
| Hungarian Albums (MAHASZ) | 6 |
| Irish Albums (IRMA) | 11 |
| Italian Albums (FIMI) | 38 |
| Japanese Digital Albums (Oricon) | 19 |
| Japanese Hot Albums (Billboard Japan) | 65 |
| New Zealand Albums (RMNZ) | 3 |
| Norwegian Albums (VG-lista) | 16 |
| Scottish Albums (Official Charts) | 11 |
| Spanish Albums (Promusicae) | 54 |
| Swedish Albums (Sverigetopplistan) | 34 |
| Swiss Albums (Schweizer Hitparade) | 14 |
| UK Albums (Official Charts) | 6 |
| US Billboard 200 | 2 |
| US Indie Store Album Sales (Billboard) | 2 |

=== Year-end charts ===
Year-end chart performance for Special
| Chart (2022) | Position |
|---|---|
| US Billboard 200 | 160 |

== Certifications ==
Certifications and sales for Special
| Region | Certification | Certified units/sales |
|---|---|---|
| Canada (Music Canada) | Platinum | 80,000^{‡} |
| France (SNEP) | Gold | 50,000^{‡} |
| New Zealand (RMNZ) | Platinum | 15,000^{‡} |
| United Kingdom (BPI) | Silver | 60,000^{‡} |
| United States | — | 600,000 |
^{‡} Sales+streaming figures based on certification alone.

== Release history ==
Release dates and formats for Special
| Region | Date | Format | Label | Ref. |
|---|---|---|---|---|
| Various | July 15, 2022 | Cassette; CD; digital download; streaming; vinyl | Nice Life; Atlantic | |
| Japan | August 31, 2022 | CD | Warner Music Japan | |
