= Lizzobangers =

2013 studio album by Lizzo

Studio album by Lizzo
- Released: October 15, 2013
- Recorded: 2012–2013
- Genre: Alternative hip-hop
- Length: 39:51
- Label: Totally Gross National Product
- Producers: Lazerbeak; Ryan Olson

Lizzo chronology
We Are the Chalice (2012)	Lizzobangers (2013)	Big Grrrl Small World (2015)

Singles from Lizzobangers
- 1. "Batches & Cookies" Released: September 10, 2013; 2. "Paris" Released: January 14, 2014; 3. "Faded" Released: May 6, 2014

Lizzobangers is the debut studio album by American singer and rapper Lizzo. It was released on Totally Gross National Product on October 15, 2013. In 2014, it was re-released on Virgin Records.

== Production ==
Lizzobangers is produced by Lazerbeak and Ryan Olson. Some beats on the album are taken from Lazerbeak's 2012 album Lava Bangers.

== Release ==
The album was released on Totally Gross National Product on October 15, 2013. In 2014, it was re-released on Virgin Records.

In 2019, the album was removed from all streaming services and digital retailers, to aid in Lizzo's campaign for Best New Artist at the 62nd Annual Grammy Awards. A month after the ceremony on February 21, 2020, the album returned to streaming services.

== Music videos ==
Music videos were created for "Batches & Cookies", "Faded", "Bus Passes and Happy Meals", and "Paris". Impose included the video for "Batches & Cookies" on the "Best Videos of 2013" list.

== Critical reception ==
Professional ratings
Aggregate scores
Source	Rating
Metacritic	85/100
Review scores
Source	Rating
Drowned in Sound	8/10
The Guardian	4/5 stars
MusicOMH	4/5 stars

At Metacritic, which assigns a weighted average score out of 100 to reviews from mainstream critics, the album received an average score of 85, based on 5 reviews, indicating "universal acclaim".

Dylan Kilby of MusicOMH gave the album four stars out of five, describing it as "a triumphant album by an extraordinary artist and woman, whose girl-empowering lyricism and social consciousness puts her at the top of the underground and alternative hip-hop community." Killian Fox of The Guardian gave the album four stars out of five, saying: "At times joyfully nonsensical, Lizzo's stream-of-consciousness rhymes can also be lethally pointed."

Star Tribune placed the album at number 1 on the "Twin Cities Critics Tally 2013" list.

== Track listing ==
All tracks are written by Melissa Jefferson, Aaron Mader, and Ryan Olson, except "Batches & Cookies", written by Jefferson, Mader, Olson, and Lauren Alford.

2013 original edition
No.	Title	Length
1.	"Lizzie Borden"	2:38
2.	"W.E.R.K. Pt. II"	3:06
3.	"Wat U Mean"	2:44
4.	"T-Baby"	3:16
5.	"Be Still"	2:13
6.	"Faded"	2:37
7.	"Hot Dish"	3:40
8.	"Make Way"	2:46
9.	"Batches & Cookies" (featuring Sophia Eris)	3:23
10.	"Pants vs. Dress"	2:34
11.	"Go"	3:45
12.	"Bloodlines"	3:45
13.	"Bus Passes and Happy Meals"	3:18
Total length:		39:51

2014 reissue edition
No.	Title	Length
8.	"Luv It"	3:03
9.	"Batches & Cookies" (featuring Sophia Eris)	3:23
10.	"Pants vs. Dress"	2:34
11.	"Go"	3:45
12.	"Bloodlines"	3:45
13.	"Bus Passes and Happy Meals"	3:18
14.	"Paris"	3:11
Total length:		43:18

== Personnel ==
Credits adapted from the 2014 vinyl edition's liner notes.

- Lizzo – vocals, flute
- Cliff Rhymes – vocals
- Sophia Eris – vocals (on "Batches & Cookies")
- Lazerbeak – production
- Ryan Olson – production
- Plain Ole Bill – turntables
- Jake Hansen – guitar
- Jim Anton – bass guitar
- James Buckley – bass guitar
- Erica Burton – viola
- Nelson Devereaux – saxophone
- Joey Van Phillips – vibraphone, percussion
- BJ Burton – mixing
- Huntley Miller – mastering
- Garrett Born – photography
- Jeffrey Barr – logo
- Paper Tiger – layout
- Drew Christopherson – layout
