= Someday at Christmas (song) =

Song by Stevie Wonder

- 2015 duet single cover

Single by Stevie Wonder

from the album Someday at Christmas
- Released: November 22, 1966
- Genre: Soul; Christmas
- Length: 2:49
- Label: Tamla
- Songwriters: Ron Miller; Bryan Wells
- Producer: Henry Cosby

Stevie Wonder singles chronology
"A Place in the Sun" (1966)	"Someday at Christmas" (1966)	"Travelin' Man" (1967)

"Someday at Christmas" is a song by American singer Stevie Wonder, from his first Christmas album and eponymous eighth studio album (1967). Written by Ron Miller and Bryan Wells, it was produced by Henry Cosby. Initially released as a standalone single in 1966, it led to the recording of its parent album which was issued a year later. Described retrospectively as "a modern holiday classic", "Someday at Christmas" gained greater popularity with the version released by the Jackson 5 in 1970 on the Jackson 5 Christmas Album, with younger brother Michael Jackson singing lead with "youthful exuberance", according to Ebony magazine.

In 2015, Wonder recorded a duet version with Andra Day for an Apple Inc. TV commercial, which re-entered the charts. The song has been recorded by over thirty artists, including Christina Aguilera, Lizzo, Pearl Jam, Brandy, Justin Bieber, and No Angels.

== Track listing ==
7" single
No.	Title	Writer(s)	Producer(s)	Length
1.	"Someday at Christmas"	Ron Miller; Bryan Wells	Henry Cosby	2:49
2.	"The Miracles of Christmas"	R. Miller; Aurora Miller	Cosby	2:24

2015 duet single
No.	Title	Writer(s)	Producer(s)	Length
1.	"Someday at Christmas" (Stevie Wonder & Andra Day)	Ron Miller; Wells	Wonder; Warryn Campbell	3:38

== Charts ==
Chart performance for "Someday at Christmas" by Stevie Wonder
Chart (1966–1998)	Peak position
Japan Hot 100 (Billboard)	48
Sweden (Sverigetopplistan)	59
US Adult R&B Songs (Billboard)	33
Chart (2015–2017)	Peak position
France (SNEP) with Andra Day	108
South Korea International (Circle) with Andra Day	27
US Adult R&B Songs (Billboard) with Andra Day	23
Chart (2021)	Peak position
South Korea (Gaon)	186
Chart (2022–2025)	Peak position
Austria (Ö3 Austria Top 40) with Andra Day	59
Germany (GfK) with Andra Day	56
Global 200 (Billboard)	88
Netherlands (Single Top 100) with Andra Day	98

=== Christina Aguilera version ===
Weekly chart performance for "Someday at Christmas"
Chart (2025)	Peak position
Costa Rica Anglo Airplay (Monitor Latino)	8

== Lizzo version ==
"Someday at Christmas"

Single by Lizzo
- Released: November 10, 2022
- Length: 2:58
- Songwriters: Ron Miller; Bryan Wells

Lizzo singles chronology
"2 Be Loved (Am I Ready)" (2022)	"Someday at Christmas" (2022)	"Special" (2023)

American singer and rapper Lizzo released a cover of "Someday at Christmas" on November 10, 2022, exclusively on Amazon Music. Lizzo chose to cover the song "not just because it's a classic, but because it's a reminder to us that almost 60 years later, we are still fighting for peace, compassion, and equality." She performed her version during her guest appearance on Saturday Night Live on December 17, 2022. Lizzo's version peaked at number 59 on the Billboard Hot 100, outperforming Wonder's original.

=== Charts ===
Chart performance for "Someday at Christmas" by Lizzo
Chart (2022)	Peak position
Canada AC (Billboard)	2
Canada CHR/Top 40 (Billboard)	50
Canada Hot AC (Billboard)	28
Global 200 (Billboard)	79
UK Singles (OCC)	8
US Billboard Hot 100	59
US Adult Contemporary (Billboard)	18
US Holiday 100	39
US Hot R&B/Hip-Hop Songs (Billboard)	15

=== Certifications ===
Certifications for "Someday at Christmas" by Lizzo
Region	Certification	Certified units/sales
United Kingdom (BPI)	Silver	200,000^{‡}
^{‡} Sales+streaming figures based on certification alone.
