= My Face Hurts from Smiling =

- Standard cover

Mixtape by Lizzo
- Released: June 27, 2025
- Length: 34:31
- Labels: Nice Life; Atlantic
- Producers: ATL Jacob; Nico Baran; B Ham; Don Kevo; Fizzle; Frankie Bash; Alex Goldblatt; Jasper Harris; Mike Hector; Hendrix Smoke; One Play Mike; Powers Pleasant; PrxdByJai; Ric & Thadeus; Ricky Reed; Ryan OG; Zack Sekoff; Tay Keith; T-Minus; Too Dope; Pop Wansel; WhosAntoine; Zaytoven

Lizzo chronology
Special (2022)	My Face Hurts from Smiling (2025)	Bitch (2026)

My Face Hurts from Smiling is the third mixtape by American rapper and singer Lizzo, released by Nice Life Recording Company and Atlantic Records on June 27, 2025. The mixtape features guest appearances from fellow American singer SZA and rapper Doja Cat. It marked her first mixtape to be released commercially under a label and followed her fourth studio album, Special (2022). My Face Hurts from Smiling was re-released on September 5, 2025, as My Face Still Hurts from Smiling, with nine additional tracks that include guest appearances from Lil Jon and Tierra Whack.

== Background ==
In February 2025, Lizzo began teasing a new album and accompanying singles by bidding goodbye to her previous album, Special. Additionally, the artist held a Twitch stream on Valentine's Day that same month teasing new music.

On June 24, 2025, Lizzo announced her mixtape, titled My Face Hurts from Smiling set to arrive on June 27. It marked her first solo project since her fourth studio album, Special (2022). She shared the official artwork, which features Lizzo smiling with middle fingers, that are covered by smiley faces, jean shorts, and a white shirt with smiley faces on Lizzo's breasts. She shared the mixtape's tracklist of 13 tracks, including collaborations with SZA and Doja Cat.

== Critical reception ==
Professional ratings
Review scores
Source	Rating
Clash	5/10
HotNewHipHop	3.5/5 stars
Rolling Stone	3/5 stars
Shatter the Standards	3/5 stars

In a mixed review, Robin Murray of Clash wrote that although My Face Hurts from Smiling is "impactful" it "doesn't stick around. A mixtape that lacks a degree of depth", pointing out that it shows "an artist who can't quite connect with the audience she built. It's reminiscent of Lizzo's early work, undeniably talented, you're left wondering if those who fell for her flute-twerking cavalcade will succumb to this".

== Track listing ==
My Face Hurts from Smiling track listing
No.	Title	Writer(s)	Producer(s)	Length
1.	"Crashout"	Melissa Jefferson; Theron Thomas; Andrew Wansel; Eric Frederic; Mike Hector; Antoine Lee	Ricky Reed; Hector; WhosAntoine	2:55
2.	"Yitty on Yo Tittys (Freestyle)"	Jefferson; Thomas; Wansel; Frederic; Xavier Dotson; Otis Williams Jr.	Zaytoven	2:28
3.	"Just 4 Fun"	Jefferson; Thomas; Wansel; Frederic; Dotson	Zaytoven	2:33
4.	"Gotcho Bitch"	Jefferson; Thomas; Wansel; Frederic; Brytavious Chambers; Jacob Canady; Jasper Harris; Derrick Miller; Zack Sekoff; Daniel Tuparia; Alexis Duvivier; Luther Campbell; Harry Wayne Casey	Reed; Tay Keith; ATL Jacob; Harris; Hendrix Smoke; Sekoff	2:52
5.	"Still Cant Fuh" (featuring Doja Cat)	Jefferson; Amala Dlamini; Thomas; Wansel; Frederic; Harris; Alex Goldblatt	Reed; Harris; Goldblatt	2:42
6.	"New Mistakes"	Jefferson; Thomas; Frederic; Ryan Ogren; Brandon Hamlin	Reed; Ryan OG; B Ham; Toby Wincorn^{[a]}	3:17
7.	"Bend It Ova"	Jefferson; Wansel; Tyler Williams; Nicholas Baran	T-Minus; Nico Baran	2:27
8.	"LeftRight"	Jefferson; Wansel; John Morris	Wansel; Reed	2:23
9.	"Droppin on It"	Jefferson; Thomas; Wansel; Frederic; Curtis Mayfield	Reed	2:33
10.	"Summa Shit"	Jefferson; Thomas; Wansel; Frederic; Harris; Elmer Fields; Leon Michels; Thomas Brenneck; Homer Steinweiss; David Guy; Nicholas Movshon; Toby Pazner	Reed; Harris	2:10
11.	"IRL" (featuring SZA)	Jefferson; Solána Rowe; Wansel; Casey McMillan; Quentin Shemwell; Kevin McIver; Sean Chavis	Wansel; Ric & Thadeus; Don Kevo; Reed	2:44
12.	"Cut Em Off"	Jefferson; Frederic; Alexia Appiah; Dotson	Zaytoven	2:11
13.	"Ditto"	Jefferson; Carlton McDowell; Thomas; Wansel; Frederic; Colin Franken; Powers Pleasant; Joshua Goldenberg; Michael Jones; Salih Williams	Frankie Bash; Pleasant; Fizzle	3:10
Total length:				34:31

My Face Still Hurts from Smiling track listing
No.	Title	Writer(s)	Producer(s)	Length
1.	"It's That Deep"	Jefferson; Reed	Reed	0:50
2.	"STFU" (featuring Lil Jon)	Jefferson; Jonathan Smith; Davion Botts; Natalie Alvarado	Reed	2:36
3.	"Bop It!"	Jefferson; Reed	Reed	1:44
4.	"Be a Bitch (Interlude)"			0:07
5.	"IDGAS"	Jefferson; Reed; Wansel; Kenneth Gamble; Leon Huff; Michael Gonzalez; Crista Russo	Crista Russo; Reed	3:04
6.	"Lace Lifters"	Jefferson; Reed; Wansel	Reed	1:43
7.	"Slow Down"	Jefferson; Wansel; Uforo Ebong; Daoud Anthony	BongoByTheWay; Daoud	2:38
8.	"I Luv Being Myself"	Jefferson; Wansel	HiTech	2:27
9.	"Internet" (featuring Tierra Whack)	Jefferson; Reed; Tierra Whack	Reed	1:58
Total length:				16:51

=== Notes ===
- All songs, like the album itself, are stylized in all caps
- ^{^[a]} signifies an additional producer
- The bonus tracks on My Face Still Hurts from Smiling are listed before the standard tracks on My Face Hurts from Smiling

=== Sample credits ===
- "Yitty on Yo Tittys (Freestyle)" is a remix of "Whim Whamiee", performed by Pluto and YK Niece, and written by Jada Smith and Shanice Cameron.
- "New Mistakes" interpolates "Fur Elise" composed by Ludwig van Beethoven.
- "IRL" contains a sample of "Shake That Ass Bitch" performed by Splack Pack.
- "STFU" contains a sample of "Goin' Crazy" by Natalie.

== Personnel ==
Credits adapted from Tidal.

- Lizzo – vocals
- Ricky Reed – mixing
- Zach Pereyra – mastering
- Bill Malina – engineering
- Doja Cat – vocals on "Still Cant Fuh"
- Nickie Jon Pabón – engineering on "New Mistakes"
- Pop Wansel – instrumentation, keyboards, and programming on "Leftright" and "IRL"
- Don Kevo – instrumentation, keyboards, and programming on "IRL"
- Ric & Thadeus – instrumentation, keyboards, and programming on "IRL"
- SZA – vocals on "IRL"
- Hayden Duncan – engineering on "IRL"
- Jason O'Neill – engineering assistance on "IRL"
- Carlton – additional vocals on "Ditto"
