= About Damn Time =

2022 single by Lizzo

Single by Lizzo

from the album Special
- Released: April 14, 2022
- Genre: Nu-disco
- Length: 3:11
- Label: Nice Life; Atlantic
- Songwriters: Blake Slatkin; Eric Frederic; Larry Price; Malcolm McLaren; Melissa Jefferson; Ronald Larkins; Stephen Hague; Theron Makiel Thomas
- Producers: Blake Slatkin; Ricky Reed

Lizzo singles chronology
"Rumors" (2021)	"About Damn Time" (2022)	"2 Be Loved (Am I Ready)" (2022)

Audio sample
- file; help

Music video
- "About Damn Time" on YouTube

"About Damn Time" is a song by American singer and rapper Lizzo, released on April 14, 2022, by Nice Life Recordings and Atlantic Records as the lead single from her fourth studio album Special (2022). The song reached number one in the United States, becoming her second number one single there, while reaching the top three in ten additional countries, as well as number six on the Billboard Global 200 chart. It is certified Diamond in France as well as Platinum or higher in fourteen additional countries.

== Background ==
"About Damn Time" was the final song created for Special. Prior to the song's creation, Lizzo felt the album was not yet complete, so she wanted to write a song that had the same uplifting emotional impact as "Good as Hell."

Blake Slatkin, a co-writer and co-producer of the song, explained in a 2022 Billboard interview that he and Ricky Reed began creating the song in January of that year. According to Slatkin, the song began with four piano chords which Reed used as a basis for a bassline. At that point, the two played Lizzo the instrumental, motivating her to travel to the studio to contribute to the track. Slatkin credits Lizzo with crafting the hook and melodies. The song required approximately 30 additional studio sessions to finish, spanning four months. At one point, the song featured an entirely different chorus from the one included in the final release.

About the song's thematic content, Lizzo stated, "I think life had thrown some major traumas and hard experiences at us, especially globally these last few years. And I wanted to write a song that allowed us to take a moment and celebrate our survival, and celebrate how far we’ve come."

== Composition ==
Billboard's Rania Aniftos said "About Damn Time" has a "feel-good" chorus, and Rachel Brodsky of Stereogum described the song as "a funk-pop cut with tons of instant-classic Lizzo-isms". Similarly, Alex Gallagher of NME called the song "a funk-tinged, classically Lizzo cut that comes replete with a groove-heavy bassline, an instantly memorable flute melody and lyrical gems". Nardine Saad from the Los Angeles Times said the song has an "affirmative, instantly uplifting disco beat", Ree Hines from Today labeled the record as "a uplifting disco bop".

The song's chorus features a piano motif interpolated from the 1984's tune "Hey DJ" by The World's Famous Supreme Team.

== Chart performance ==
For the week dated April 30, 2022, "About Damn Time" debuted at number 50 on the US Billboard Hot 100 chart, with 7,000 digital downloads and 6.5 million U.S. streams. On the week dated May 14, 2022, the song jumped from number 60 to number 19, becoming her fourth top 20 hit. One week later, the song rose to number nine becoming her fourth top 10 hit. The song peaked at number one on the Billboard Hot 100 in its 14th week, becoming her second number one on the chart after "Truth Hurts". "About Damn Time" held at number one on the Hot 100 for 2 consecutive weeks. On July 3, 2026, the song reached 1 billion streams on Spotify.

== Promotion ==
Lizzo previewed the song on The Late Late Show with James Corden in March 2022. She first performed the song in full on Saturday Night Live on April 16, 2022, where she pulled double duty as both host and musical guest.

During the months following the song's release, Lizzo promoted "About Damn Time" heavily through TikTok, including a video celebrating the appointment of Ketanji Brown Jackson to the Supreme Court of the United States. TikTok personality Jaeden Gomez choreographed an easily replicable dance for the song that became a viral phenomenon on the platform, which included celebrities, influencers, and musicians like Meredith Brooks, Sofia Carson, Jenna Dewan, Joe Jonas, Colleen Ballinger, Blake Shelton and many others; Lizzo spotlighted Gomez's choreography in multiple performance and tutorial videos.

On June 26, 2022, Lizzo performed "About Damn Time" at the 22nd BET Awards; during the song, Lizzo stated, "It’s about damn time we stand in our power. Black people, my people." On June 27, The Late Late Show with James Corden premiered a Carpool Karaoke segment with Lizzo, which culminated in Corden and Lizzo performing the song's TikTok choreography with a troupe of dancers. Jaeden Gomez appeared as a cameo in the segment.

== Music video ==
The song's music video was directed by Christian Breslauer. In the video, Lizzo runs out of a "Stressed & Sexy" support group meeting. While dancing in a school building, her outfit changes from a sweatsuit into a sequined jumpsuit that she wears for the remainder of the video. In further scenes, Lizzo dances down a hallway with an illuminated dance floor and plays a flute while walking atop the water in a swimming pool.

== Accolades ==
Awards and nominations for "About Damn Time"
Organization	Year	Category	Result	Ref.
American Music Awards	2022	Favorite Pop Song	Nominated	
MTV Video Music Awards	2022	Song of the Year	Nominated	
MTV Video Music Awards	2022	Best Pop Video	Nominated	
MTV Video Music Awards	2022	Video For Good	Won	
MTV Video Music Awards	2022	Song of Summer	Nominated	
MTV Europe Music Awards	2022	Best Song	Nominated	
MTV Europe Music Awards	2022	Video For Good	Nominated	
Soul Train Music Awards	2022	Song of the Year	Nominated	
Soul Train Music Awards	2022	Video of the Year	Nominated	
Soul Train Music Awards	2022	Best Dance Performance	Won	
LOS40 Music Awards	2022	Best International Song	Nominated	
LOS40 Music Awards	2022	Best International Video	Nominated	
People's Choice Awards	2022	Song of the Year	Won	
Variety Hitmakers	2023	Record of the Year	Won	
Nickelodeon Kids' Choice Awards	2023	Favorite Song	Nominated	
Brit Awards	2023	International Song	Nominated	
iHeartRadio Music Awards	2023	Song of the Year	Nominated	
iHeartRadio Music Awards	2023	Best Lyrics	Nominated	
iHeartRadio Music Awards	2023	TikTok Bop of the Year	Nominated	
BET Awards	2023	Video of the Year	Nominated	
BET Awards	2023	Viewer's Choice Award	Nominated	
BET Awards	2023	BET Her Award	Nominated	
Grammy Awards	2023	Record of the Year	Won	
Grammy Awards	2023	Song of the Year	Nominated	
Grammy Awards	2023	Best Pop Solo Performance	Nominated	
Grammy Awards	2023	Best Remixed Recording	Won	

== Charts ==
=== Weekly charts ===
Weekly chart performance for "About Damn Time"
Chart (2022–2024)	Peak position
Argentina Hot 100 (Billboard)	44
Australia (ARIA)	3
Austria (Ö3 Austria Top 40)	23
Belgium (Ultratop 50 Flanders)	2
Belgium (Ultratop 50 Wallonia)	3
Brazil Airplay (Top 100 Brasil)	71
Bulgaria International (PROPHON)	3
Canada Hot 100 (Billboard)	2
Canada AC (Billboard)	1
Canada CHR/Top 40 (Billboard)	1
Canada Hot AC (Billboard)	1
Chile (Monitor Latino)	8
CIS Airplay (TopHit)	87
Czech Republic Singles Digital (ČNS IFPI)	11
Croatia International (HRT)	2
Denmark (Tracklisten)	14
Estonia Airplay (TopHit)	110
Finland (Suomen virallinen lista)	19
France (SNEP)	52
Germany (GfK)	34
Global 200 (Billboard)	6
Greece International (IFPI)	12
Hungary (Rádiós Top 40)	29
Hungary (Single Top 40)	22
Hungary (Stream Top 40)	11
Iceland (Tónlistinn)	2
Ireland (IRMA)	2
Italy (FIMI)	30
Japan Hot Overseas (Billboard Japan)	1
Lebanon (Lebanese Top 20)	2
Lithuania (AGATA)	6
Malaysia International (RIM)	16
Mexico (Billboard Mexican Airplay)	1
Netherlands (Dutch Top 40)	17
Netherlands (Single Top 100)	17
New Zealand (Recorded Music NZ)	2
Norway (VG-lista)	13
Paraguay (Monitor Latino)	8
Philippines (Billboard)	12
Portugal (AFP)	28
San Marino (SMRRTV Top 50)	3
Singapore (RIAS)	14
Slovakia Airplay (ČNS IFPI)	89
Slovakia Singles Digital (ČNS IFPI)	10
South Africa Streaming (TOSAC)	19
South Korea Download (Gaon)	116
Sweden (Sverigetopplistan)	22
Switzerland (Schweizer Hitparade)	13
UK Singles (Official Charts)	3
US Billboard Hot 100	1
US Adult Alternative Airplay (Billboard)	40
US Adult Contemporary (Billboard)	13
US Adult Pop Airplay (Billboard)	1
US Dance Airplay (Billboard)	1
US Hot R&B/Hip-Hop Songs (Billboard)	1
US Pop Airplay (Billboard)	1
US R&B/Hip-Hop Airplay (Billboard)	10
US Rhythmic Airplay (Billboard)	1

=== Year-end charts ===
2022 year-end chart performance for "About Damn Time"
Chart (2022)	Position
Australia (ARIA)	10
Belgium (Ultratop Flanders)	23
Belgium (Ultratop Wallonia)	18
Canada (Canadian Hot 100)	8
Denmark (Tracklisten)	87
France (SNEP)	158
Global 200 (Billboard)	30
Hungary (Stream Top 40)	91
Lithuania (AGATA)	74
Netherlands (Single Top 100)	89
New Zealand (Recorded Music NZ)	21
Switzerland (Schweizer Hitparade)	66
UK Singles (OCC)	19
US Billboard Hot 100	12
US Adult Contemporary (Billboard)	24
US Adult Top 40 (Billboard)	7
US Hot R&B/Hip-Hop Songs (Billboard)	4
US Mainstream Top 40 (Billboard)	5
US Rhythmic (Billboard)	13

2023 year-end chart performance for "About Damn Time"
Chart (2023)	Position
Australia (ARIA)	98
Global 200 (Billboard)	196

Year-end chart performance
Chart (2025)	Position
Argentina Anglo Airplay (Monitor Latino)	61

== Certifications ==
Certifications for "About Damn Time"
Region	Certification	Certified units/sales
Australia (ARIA)	Platinum	70,000^{‡}
Austria (IFPI Austria)	Platinum	30,000^{‡}
Brazil (Pro-Música Brasil)	Platinum	40,000^{‡}
Canada (Music Canada)	6× Platinum	480,000^{‡}
Denmark (IFPI Danmark)	Platinum	90,000^{‡}
France (SNEP)	Diamond	333,333^{‡}
Italy (FIMI)	Platinum	100,000^{‡}
New Zealand (RMNZ)	3× Platinum	90,000^{‡}
Norway (IFPI Norway)	Platinum	60,000^{‡}
Poland (ZPAV)	Platinum	50,000^{‡}
Portugal (AFP)	Platinum	10,000^{‡}
Spain (Promusicae)	Platinum	60,000^{‡}
Switzerland (IFPI Switzerland)	Platinum	20,000^{‡}
United Kingdom (BPI)	2× Platinum	1,200,000^{‡}
United States (RIAA)	2× Platinum	2,000,000^{‡}
^{‡} Sales+streaming figures based on certification alone.

== Release history ==
Release dates and formats for "About Damn Time"
Region	Date	Format(s)	Version	Label	Ref.
Various	April 14, 2022	Digital download; streaming	Original	Nice Life; Atlantic	
Italy	April 15, 2022	Radio airplay	Original	Warner	
United States	April 18, 2022	Adult contemporary radio	Original	Atlantic	
United States	April 19, 2022	Contemporary hit radio	Original	Atlantic	
United States	April 19, 2022	Rhythmic contemporary radio	Original	Atlantic	
United States	April 19, 2022	Urban contemporary radio	Original	Atlantic	
United States	April 19, 2022	Urban adult contemporary radio	Original	Atlantic	
Various	May 18, 2022	Digital download; streaming	Purple Disco Machine remix	Nice Life; Atlantic	
Various	July 15, 2022	CD single	Original	Nice Life; Atlantic	
Various	July 15, 2022	CD single	Purple Disco Machine remix	Nice Life; Atlantic	

== In other media ==
"About Damn Time" was used in the pre-game montage for the October 15, 2022 broadcast of Hockey Night in Canada on Canadian sports channel Sportsnet celebrating its 70th season on television. The montage began with host Ron MacLean summarizing events that occurred when the program went on the air in 1952 before cutting into the song beginning. The game the montage served as the intro for was the game between the Ottawa Senators and the Toronto Maple Leafs, which was broadcast on all Sportsnet regional channels except Sportsnet East, which broadcast the game between the Montreal Canadiens and the Washington Capitals instead.

"About Damn Time" is also included in the online music video games Just Dance+ since April 6, 2023 and Dance Dance Revolution World since July 23, 2026.

== See also ==
- List of Billboard Hot 100 number ones of 2022
- List of Billboard number-one dance songs of 2022
