= Pink (Lizzo song) =

2023 song by Lizzo

Song by Lizzo

from the album Barbie the Album
- Released: July 21, 2023
- Genre: Soft pop; funk-pop; post-disco
- Length: 2:23
- Label: Atlantic
- Songwriters: Melissa Jefferson; Andrew Blakemore; Mark Ronson; Eric Frederic
- Producers: Andrew Wyatt; Ronson; Ricky Reed

Music video
- "Pink" on YouTube

"Pink" is a song by American singer and rapper Lizzo, released on July 21, 2023, as the opening track from Barbie the Album, the soundtrack of the 2023 film Barbie. The song was written by Lizzo alongside Andrew Wyatt, Mark Ronson, and Ricky Reed. The latter three writers would also produce the track. The song was featured in Barbie alongside an alternate version of the song, "Pink (Bad Day)", which only appears as a bonus track on some editions of the soundtrack.

Although the song was not released as an official single, it did make the charts in five countries, including a position at number 6 on the US Bubbling Under Hot 100 chart and number 156 on the Billboard Global 200 chart. The song also hit number 27 on the UK singles chart, number 36 on the Irish Singles Chart, number 89 on the Canadian Hot 100, and number 86 on the ARIA Charts in Australia.

== Background ==
The song was originally written as an instrumental, but the composers decided to add lyrics. Having already worked with Lizzo before, Mark Ronson said she was "obviously at the very top of the list of people that we spoke to, and she dug it." They only had two days to finish the song; Ronson recalled, "Halfway through the second day, I was just like, This isn't going to work. I'm going back to Greta empty-handed. Lizzo said, 'You know what? Throw this picture up again.' And she's like, 'Play the track.' And she just starts narrating what's going on on the screen. Like, 'Hey, Barbie.'"

In an interview with IndieWire, Barbie director Greta Gerwig said "When Lizzo came on, she basically wrote and riffed on top of what [Ronson and Wyatt] had written as a base. She knew exactly what was funny about [the film], and what she was doing with her lyrics was the same kind of humor that we were doing; when she was literally singing what you're seeing on screen, it was so deeply funny and all of sudden, as a result, it felt like it all went together." Editor Nick Houy said the song "suddenly changed the way people saw the beginning" of the movie. "It solved all of the problems we were having, which weren't crazy, but I remember everyone suddenly got the tone of the movie immediately in a way they hadn't before."

== Composition ==
"Pink" has been described as similar in style to "bouncy 80s soft-pop", and taking inspiration from "All Night Long (All Night)" by Lionel Richie. Congas and horns are used in the instrumental. In the lyrics, Lizzo narrates the morning routine of the film's titular main character, such as waking up in the world of Barbie and meeting with her Barbie friends.

== Critical reception ==
The song received generally positive reviews from music critics. Danielle Chelosky of Uproxx praised it for Lizzo's "typically buoyant, extravagant ambiance and her confident vocals". Alex Rigotti of NME wrote, "Opener 'Pink' is a smooth disco number from Lizzo, who is her effortlessly charismatic self." Reviewing Barbie the Album for Paste, Victoria Wasylak stated "No one commits to the bit more than Lizzo, though, who offers a rose-colored preview of Barbie's eerily chipper universe on opening track 'Pink.' Yes, the song involves Lizzo spelling its simplistic title. Yes, its femme-forward, can-do lyricism vaguely echoes the Bob the Builder theme. No, it doesn’t hold its own outside of the movie, but that's only because 'Pink' sets the scene in stiletto-sharp detail that sounds juvenile anywhere outside of 'Barbie Land.'" Hollie Geraghty of Rolling Stone UK wrote, "From the funky opening beats and whimsical story narration of 'Pink', Lizzo quickly sets the mood for 17 tracks of Barbie girl abandon." Tanatat Khuttapan of The Line of Best Fit commented the song "offers sun-lit, languid dance grooves to greet our new company with theatrical vivacity."

Cat Zhang of Pitchfork gave a negative review, writing "And so you have songs like Lizzo's 'Pink,' which, even with congas, horns, and jubilant backing vocals, scans as a more insipid iteration of her usual you-go-girl jams: 'What you wearing? Dress or suit? Either way that power looks so good on you,' she coos, ostensibly satirizing an affirmation culture that blindly validates women's choices." Lucas Martins of Beats Per Minute also criticized the song, commenting it sees Lizzo "singing over a less intense version of the disco sound she's done before."

Music critics have drawn comparisons between "Pink" and "Perfect Day" by Hoku, the opening song of the soundtrack to the 2001 film Legally Blonde.

== "Pink (Bad Day)" ==
An alternative version of the song titled "Pink (Bad Day)" was released on July 29, 2023. In the film, this version is played when the titular character is having an existential crisis. The song, although in the film, was not released on the soundtrack. Instead, it was released as a bonus track to the album, specifically the Bonus Track Edition, the VMP Designer Edition, and the Character Editions. Although the original version of the song charted, this version of the song did not chart.

== Charts ==
Chart performance for "Pink"
Chart (2023)	Peak position
Australia (ARIA)	86
Canada Hot 100 (Billboard)	89
Global 200 (Billboard)	156
Ireland (IRMA)	36
UK Singles (Official Charts)	27
US Bubbling Under Hot 100 (Billboard)	6

== Certifications ==
Certifications for "Pink"
Region	Certification	Certified units/sales
United Kingdom (BPI)	Silver	200,000^{‡}
^{‡} Sales+streaming figures based on certification alone.
