= Big Grrrl Small World =

2015 studio album by Lizzo

Studio album by Lizzo
- Released: December 11, 2015
- Recorded: 2013–2015
- Genre: Hip-hop
- Length: 43:30
- Label: BGSW
- Producers: BJ Burton; Sam Spiegel; Jake Troth; Lazerbeak; Stefon "Bionik" Taylor; Taskforce

Lizzo chronology
Lizzobangers (2013)	Big Grrrl Small World (2015)	Coconut Oil (2016)

Singles from Big Grrrl Small World
- 1. "Humanize" Released: October 13, 2015; 2. "Ain't I" Released: October 27, 2015; 3. "My Skin" Released: November 18, 2015

Big Grrrl Small World (sometimes stylized as Big GRRRL Small World) is the second studio album by American singer and rapper Lizzo. It was released on her own record label BGSW on December 11, 2015. The album received "generally favorable reviews" from critics.

== Production ==
As soon as her debut studio album Lizzobangers was released in 2013, Lizzo started writing new songs. She made at least 25 demos that didn't end up on Big Grrrl Small World. The oldest song on the album is "The Fade".

In 2014, Lizzo participated in StyleLikeU's What's Underneath project, where she removed her clothes as she talked about her relationships with her body. Inspired by the experience, she wrote "My Skin", which she described as "the thesis statement of the album". In a 2015 interview with Vice, she said: "You can wake up and change many things about your appearance, but the inevitability of waking up in your skin is what unifies us."

The recording of the album took place at Justin Vernon's April Base Studios in Fall Creek, Wisconsin.

== Release ==
The album was released on BGSW on December 11, 2015. In 2019, the album was removed from all streaming services and digital retailers, to aid in Lizzo's campaign for Best New Artist at the 62nd Annual Grammy Awards.

== Music videos ==
Music videos were created for "My Skin" and "Humanize". Paste placed the video for "My Skin" at number 8 on the "25 Best Music Videos of 2015" list.

== Critical reception ==
Professional ratings
Aggregate scores
Source	Rating
Metacritic	79/100
Review scores
Source	Rating
DIY	4/5 stars
The Guardian	4/5 stars
NME	4/5
The Observer	3/5 stars
Paste	8.2/10
Pitchfork	7.5/10
Spin	7/10

At Metacritic, which assigns a weighted average score out of 100 to reviews from mainstream critics, the album received an average score of 79, based on 10 reviews, indicating "generally favorable reviews".

Alexis Petridis of The Guardian gave the album four stars out of five, saying, "the album's tracks display a marked tendency to end up in an entirely different place from where they started, helped by the fact that Lizzo is as strong a vocalist as she is a rapper."

Hilary Saunders of Paste gave the album an 8.2 out of 10, praising Lizzo's "ability to rap and sing with equal tenacity."

Andrea Swensson of The Current wrote: "There's an old feminist adage that says that the personal is political, and Lizzo seems to understand this concept intrinsically."

=== Top ten lists ===
Star Tribune placed the album at number 3 on the "Twin Cities Critics Tally 2015" list. Spin placed it at number 17 on the "50 Best Hip-Hop Albums of 2015" list.

== Track listing ==
All tracks written by Melissa "Lizzo" Jefferson.

Big Grrrl Small World track listing
No.	Title	Producer(s)	Length
1.	"Ain't I"	BJ Burton; Sam Spiegel; Jake Troth	3:55
2.	"Betcha"	Burton	2:59
3.	"Ride"	Burton; Lazerbeak	3:50
4.	"Humanize"	Burton	3:30
5.	"Bother Me"	Burton	5:02
6.	"B.G.S.W."	Stefon "Bionik" Taylor	3:16
7.	"The Fade"	Taskforce	2:59
8.	"1 Deep"	Burton	3:26
9.	"The Realest"	Burton	3:54
10.	"En Love"	Taylor	3:24
11.	"My Skin"	Taylor	4:18
12.	"Jang a Lang"	Taylor	2:51
Total length:			43:30

== Personnel ==
Credits adapted from the 2015 CD edition's liner notes.

- Lizzo – vocals, flute
- BJ Burton – production (1, 2, 3, 4, 5, 8, 9), executive production, vocals, vocoder, guitar, synthesizer, drum programming
- Sam Spiegel – production (1)
- Jake Troth – production (1)
- Lazerbeak – production (3), drum programming
- Stefon "Bionik" Taylor – production (6, 10, 11, 12), turntables, guitar, synthesizer, drum programming
- Taskforce – production (7), drum programming
- Sophia Eris – vocals
- Claire Monesterio – vocals
- Quinn Wilson – vocals
- Eric Mayson – vocals, piano, synthesizer
- Justin Vernon – vocoder, synthesizer
- Francis Starlite – synthesizer, drum programming
- Ryan Olson – synthesizer
- Nelson Devereaux – saxophone
- Ben Lester – pedal steel guitar
- James Buckley – upright bass, bass guitar
- Joey Van Phillips – drums
- Huntley Miller – mastering
