= Lizzo =

American singer and rapper (born 1988)

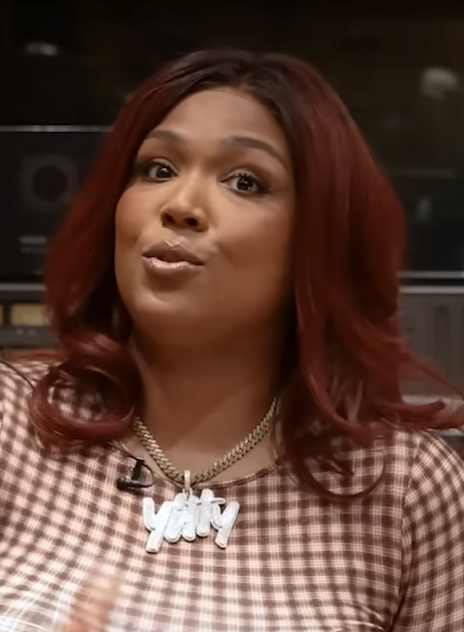
- Lizzo in 2025
- Born: Melissa Viviane Jefferson; April 27, 1988 (age 38); Detroit, Michigan, U.S.
- Education: University of Houston
- Occupations: Singer; rapper; songwriter; actress
- Years active: 2011–present
- Works: Discography
- Awards: Full list
- Musical career
- Origin: Houston, Texas, U.S.
- Genres: Pop; hip-hop; R&B
- Instruments: Vocals; flute
- Labels: TGNP; Atlantic; Nice Life; BGSW
- Formerly of: Ellypseas; Lizzo & the Larva Ink; The Chalice; Grrrl Prty
- Website: lizzomusic.com

Logo

Melissa Viviane Jefferson (born April 27, 1988), known professionally as Lizzo (/ˈlɪzoʊ/), is an American singer, rapper, songwriter, and actress. Born in Detroit, Michigan, she moved to Houston, Texas, with her family at the age of 10. After college, she moved to Minneapolis, Minnesota, where she began her recording career in hip-hop. Lizzo released two studio albums, Lizzobangers (2013) and Big Grrrl Small World (2015).

In 2016, Lizzo signed to Atlantic Records and released her first major-label extended play (EP), Coconut Oil. Her third studio album, Cuz I Love You (2019), peaked at number four on the US Billboard 200 and won three Grammy Awards. It spawned the multi-platinum single "Juice", while its deluxe version included the 2016 single "Good as Hell" and the 2017 single "Truth Hurts"; the latter became a viral sleeper hit two years after its initial release and topped the US Billboard Hot 100. Her fourth studio album, Special (2022), was led by her second US number-one single, "About Damn Time", which also won the Grammy Award for Record of the Year. After a hiatus, she released her third mixtape, My Face Hurts from Smiling (2025), followed by her fifth studio album Bitch (2026).

Along with her recording career, Lizzo has also worked as an actress; she performed a voice role in the animated film UglyDolls (2019), and appeared in the crime comedy-drama film Hustlers (2019). She is also the host of the Amazon Prime Video reality television series Lizzo's Watch Out for the Big Grrrls, for which she won the Primetime Emmy Award for Outstanding Competition Program. In 2019, Time named Lizzo "Entertainer of the Year" for her meteoric rise and contributions to music. In addition to four Grammy Awards, she has also won a Billboard Music Award, a BET Award, and two Soul Train Music Awards.

== Early life and education ==
Melissa Viviane Jefferson was born on April 27, 1988, in Detroit, Michigan. When she was ten, her family relocated to Houston, Texas. She was classically trained as a flutist for eight years, from the age of 10 until she graduated from Alief Elsik High School in 2006, where she had started rapping. At age 14, she formed a musical group called Cornrow Clique with her friends. At this time, she acquired the nickname "Lizzo", a variant of "Lissa", inspired by Jay-Z's "Izzo (H.O.V.A.)". In college, she studied classical music, concentrating on flute, at the University of Houston. At age 21, after her father's death, she lived out of her car for a year as she tried to break into the music industry. In 2009 and 2010, she performed lead vocals and flute in the jazz/prog rock quintet Ellypseas. She dropped out of college and moved to Minneapolis, Minnesota, in 2011.

== Career ==
=== 2011–2013: Career beginnings and Lizzobangers ===
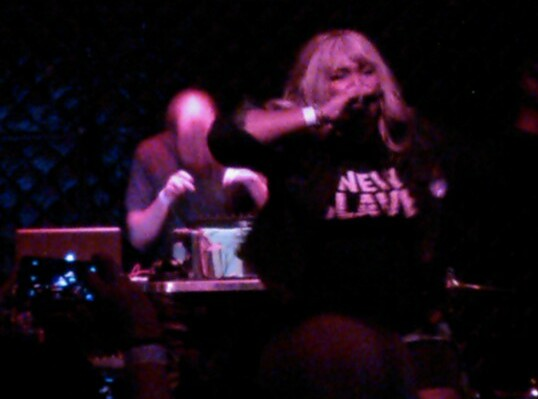
Lizzo at the Triple Rock Social Club in 2013

While living in Minneapolis, Lizzo performed with groups including the electro soul-pop duo Lizzo & the Larva Ink. During this time she helped form a three-piece all-female rap/R&B group, the Chalice. In 2012, the Chalice released its first album, We Are the Chalice, which was locally successful. In 2013, Lizzo was one of five artists to form the hip-hop group Grrrl Prty, which released two EPs before playing its final show at Rock the Garden and disbanding in 2016. Lizzo's hip-hop-focused debut album, Lizzobangers, produced by Lazerbeak and Ryan Olson, was released on October 15, 2013. Killian Fox of The Guardian gave the album 4 stars out of 5, saying: "At times joyfully nonsensical, Lizzo's stream-of-consciousness rhymes can also be lethally pointed."

The album topped Star Tribune's "Twin Cities Critics Tally 2013" list. Music videos were created for the songs "Batches & Cookies", "Faded", "Bus Passes and Happy Meals", and "Paris". Lizzo toured the US and UK in the fall of 2013, opening for Har Mar Superstar and singing with his band. In October 2013, Lizzo won City Pages' "Picked to Click" award for best new Twin Cities artist. The next month Time named her one of 14 music artists to watch in 2014. The album was subsequently re-released by Virgin Records. Later that year, Lizzo shared the stage with St. Paul and the Broken Bones, performing "A Change Is Gonna Come" together.

=== 2014–2018: Big Grrrl Small World and Coconut Oil ===
Following the release of her first album, Lizzo immediately began working on new music. In 2014, she participated in StyleLikeU's What's Underneath project, where she removed her clothes as she talked about her relationships with her body. Inspired by the experience, she wrote "My Skin", which she called "the thesis statement" of her forthcoming second album. In an interview with Vice, regarding body image, she said:

You can wake up and change many things about your appearance, but the inevitability of waking up in your skin is what unifies us.

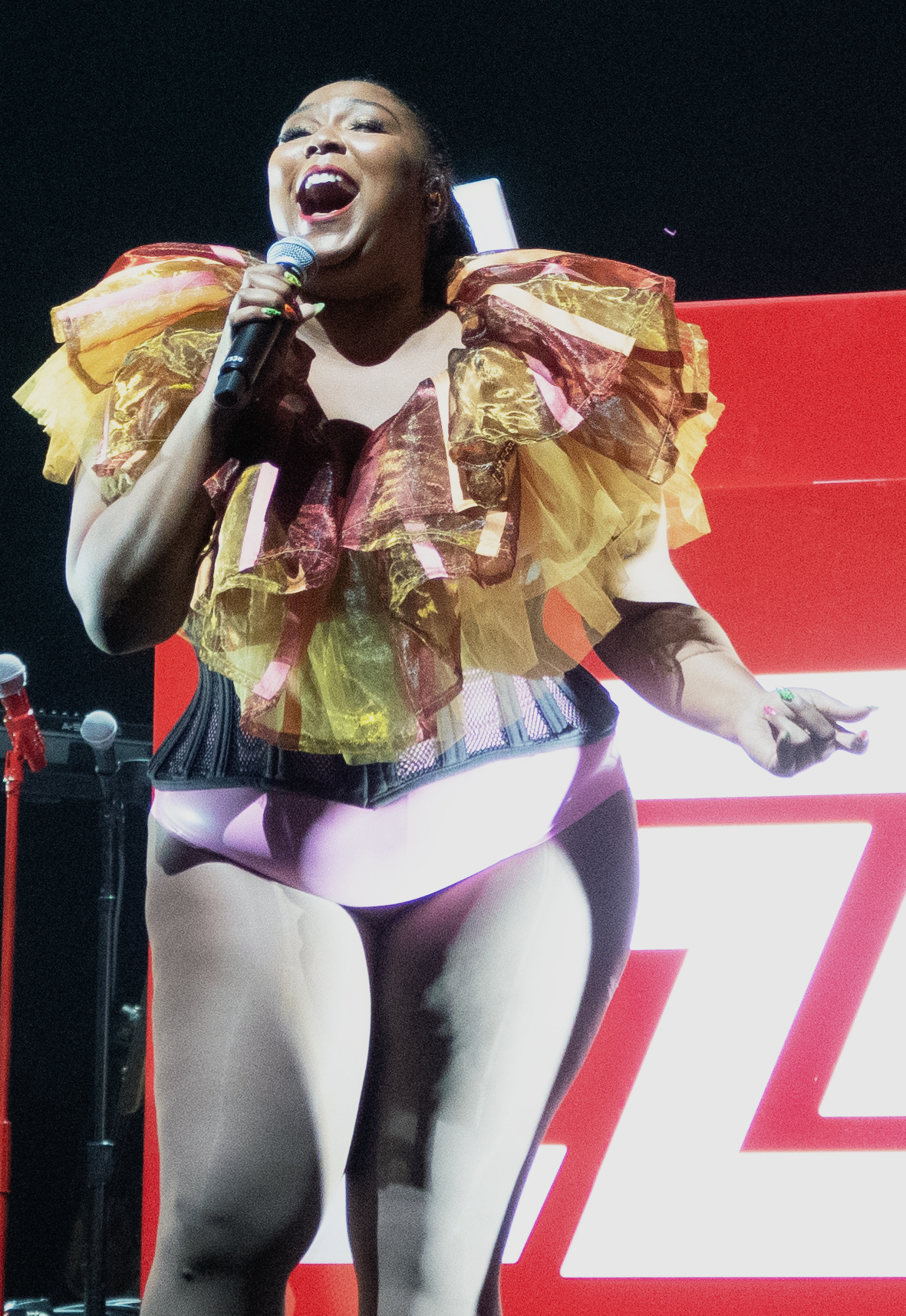
Lizzo opening for Florence and the Machine in 2018

In September 2014, Lizzo was featured alongside her Chalice bandmates Sophia Eris and Claire de Lune on the song "BoyTrouble" on Prince's and 3rdeyegirl's album Plectrumelectrum. On working with Prince, Lizzo called the experience "surreal ... almost like a fairytale" and "something I will never actually get over." On October 7, 2014, Lizzo appeared as the musical guest on the Late Show with David Letterman. Lizzo's second studio album, Big Grrrl Small World, was released on December 11, 2015. Spin placed the album at number 17 on the "50 Best Hip-Hop Albums of 2015" list. Hilary Saunders of Paste praised Lizzo's "ability to rap and sing with equal tenacity." Her collaboration with Your Smith (then Caroline Smith), "Let 'Em Say", was featured in the season three premiere of Broad City.

Lizzo was one of the hosts of MTV's short-lived 2016 live music performance series Wonderland. After signing with Atlantic Records that same year, Lizzo released her first major-label extended play, Coconut Oil, on October 7, 2016. "Good as Hell" was released as the lead single from the Coconut Oil on March 8, 2016, as part of the soundtrack for the 2016 film Barbershop: The Next Cut. Lizzo co-wrote each song on the album, while enlisting Ricky Reed, Christian Rich, Dubbel Dutch, and Jesse Shatkin for the album's production. The result was a departure from Lizzo's previous alternative hip-hop releases. Lyrically, the extended play explores themes of body positivity, self-love, and the journey to those ideals.

Coconut Oil received positive reviews from music critics. Syra Aburto, writing for Nylon, wrote that "like the product it's named after, [Lizzo's] latest project, Coconut Oil, is essential for healthy living." Rolling Stone placed it at No. 14 on the list of the "20 Best Pop Albums of 2016". Commercially, Coconut Oil peaked at number 44 on US Top R&B/Hip-Hop Albums, making it Lizzo's first release to chart. To promote the extended play, Lizzo embarked on the Good as Hell Tour in 2017. In May she headlined The Infatuation's annual food festival, EEEEEATSCON, and also appeared as a guest judge on the tenth season of RuPaul's Drag Race. In early 2018, Lizzo toured with both Haim and Florence and the Machine.

After struggling with body issues at an early age, Lizzo became an advocate for body positivity and self-love as she attracted more mainstream attention, while making diversity the focus of her music, in regards to one's body, sexuality, race, and more. Her group of back-up dancers, the Big Grrrls, consists of all plus-size dancers. Highlighting body inclusivity and celebrating individuality, Lizzo appeared in ModCloth's "Say It Louder" campaign, which launched on June 11, 2018. In the same month, she sported the first plus-size outfit made for FIT's Future of Fashion runway show by Grace Insogna for her performance at NYC Pride's Pride Island event. Lizzo was profiled in the June 2018 Teen Vogue Music Issue.

=== 2019–2020: Career breakthrough and Cuz I Love You ===
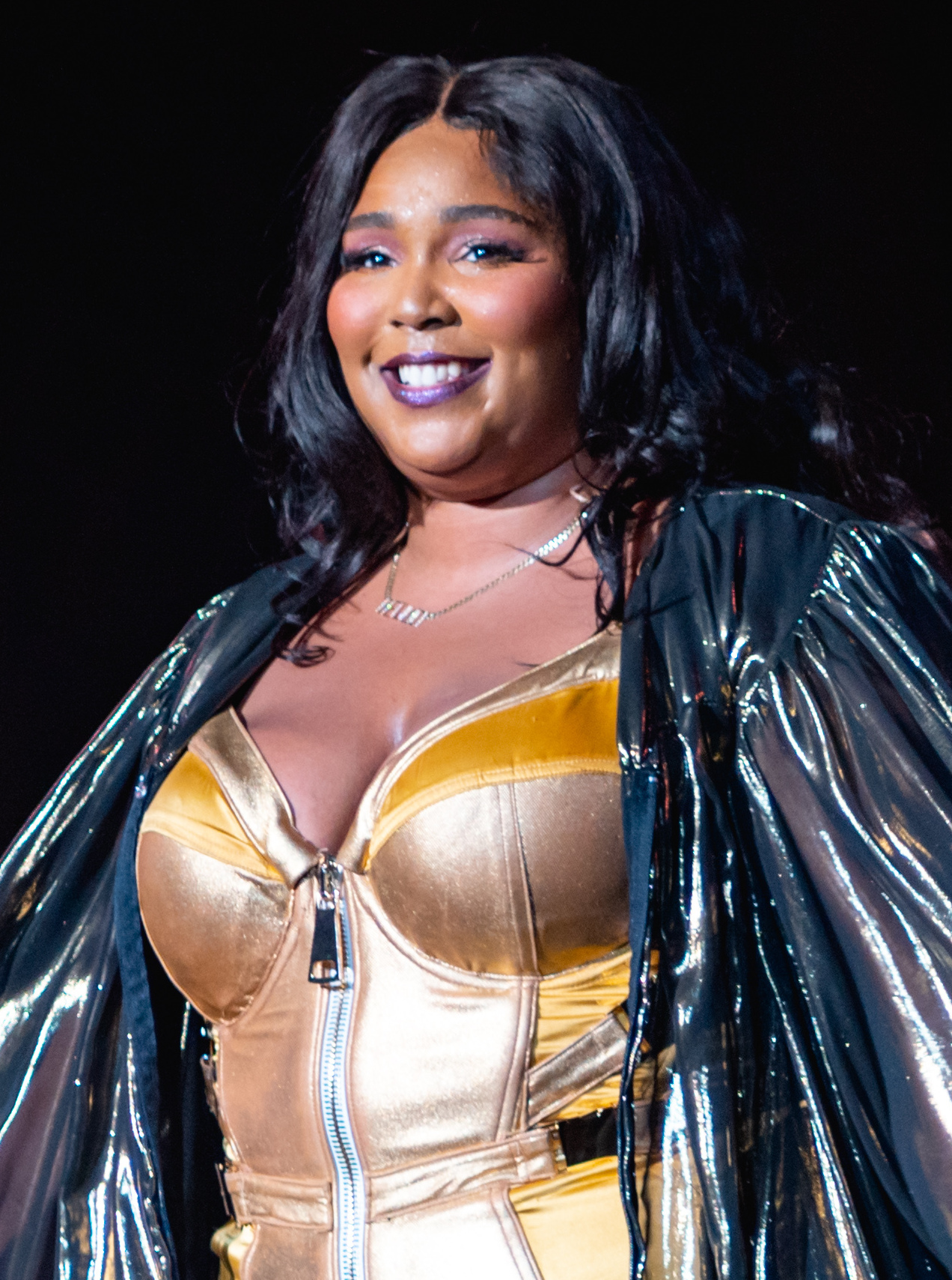
Lizzo performing at the Brixton Academy in November 2019

In 2019, in addition to her musical projects, Lizzo ventured into acting, with a voice performance in the animated film UglyDolls, and a supporting part in the crime comedy-drama film Hustlers. "Juice", the lead single from her third studio album, was released on January 4, 2019, by Atlantic Records. The next month, she announced the title of the album, Cuz I Love You, which was eventually released on April 19, 2019. After the release of her album, she performed at the Coachella Music Festival for the first time. The release of Cuz I Love You marked a turning point in Lizzo's career, as she began to attract more mainstream attention; the album debuted at number six on the Billboard 200 and eventually peaked at number four on the chart, three months after its initial release.

After inspiring an internet meme on the TikTok video sharing app and being featured in the 2019 Netflix film Someone Great, Lizzo's 2017 single "Truth Hurts" began to gain popularity and was added to the deluxe version of Cuz I Love You. The single became a viral sleeper hit, and, in turn, increased interest for Cuz I Love You, which remained in the top 10 of the Billboard 200 for several months.

"Truth Hurts" has since become Lizzo's first number-one hit on the Billboard Hot 100. Lizzo became the third female rapper to top the Hot 100 without a featured artist. She also became the first black solo female R&B singer to claim the top spot on the Hot 100 since Rihanna's 2012 hit "Diamonds". A week later, on September 9, 2019, Cuz I Love You became certified gold by the RIAA with over 500,000 equivalent units sold. "Truth Hurts" spent seven weeks atop the Hot 100, tying for the most weeks at number one for a rap song by a female artist. The music video for the song, in which Lizzo "marries herself", has amassed more than 220 million views on YouTube. In an interview, she revealed that the initial lack of success for "Truth Hurts"—what she had thought to be her best song yet at the time—caused her to seriously consider quitting the music industry altogether.

Lizzo is also well known for her ability to play the flute. She began playing as a child, and has continued to improve her flute playing skills into adulthood. She has performed with her flute, which she has named Sasha Flute, in several of her musical performances, including when she performed "Truth Hurts" at the 2019 BET Awards. Her performance at the BET Awards earned her a standing ovation from the crowd, which included Rihanna. Throughout the summer of 2019, Lizzo frequently performed, including on the West Holts stage at the Glastonbury Festival, and as a headliner at the Indianapolis and Sacramento pride festivals.

On July 23, 2019, Lizzo was nominated for Push Artist of the Year and Best New Artist at the 2019 MTV Video Music Awards. She performed a medley of "Truth Hurts" and "Good as Hell" at the 2019 MTV Video Music Awards; her performance received critical praise. Around this time, her 2016 single "Good as Hell" also climbed the charts around the world, reaching the top three of the Billboard Hot 100 and the top ten of the UK Singles Chart. The song also reached the top ten in Australia and Belgium.

Lizzo made her Saturday Night Live debut as a musical guest on the December 21, 2019, episode, which Eddie Murphy hosted. The episode was the final episode of both the year and the decade. In January 2020, Lizzo headlined FOMO Festival, performing in four Australian cities and Auckland, New Zealand. She also performed a sold-out show at the Sydney Opera House, where she had previously performed as a young flute player. She opened the 62nd Annual Grammy Awards with a medley of "Cuz I Love You" and "Truth Hurts", and won three awards at the ceremony. She received eleven nominations at the 2020 Billboard Music Award, winning one for Top Song Sales Artist. At the 2020 BET Awards, she became the first act to be nominated in both the R&B/pop and hip-hop artist categories in the same year. In August 2020, Lizzo signed a production deal with Amazon Studios to develop new projects with them. Her first project was an unscripted reality competition series called Lizzo's Watch Out for the Big Grrrls. The show premiered on March 24, 2022.

=== 2021–2024: Special ===
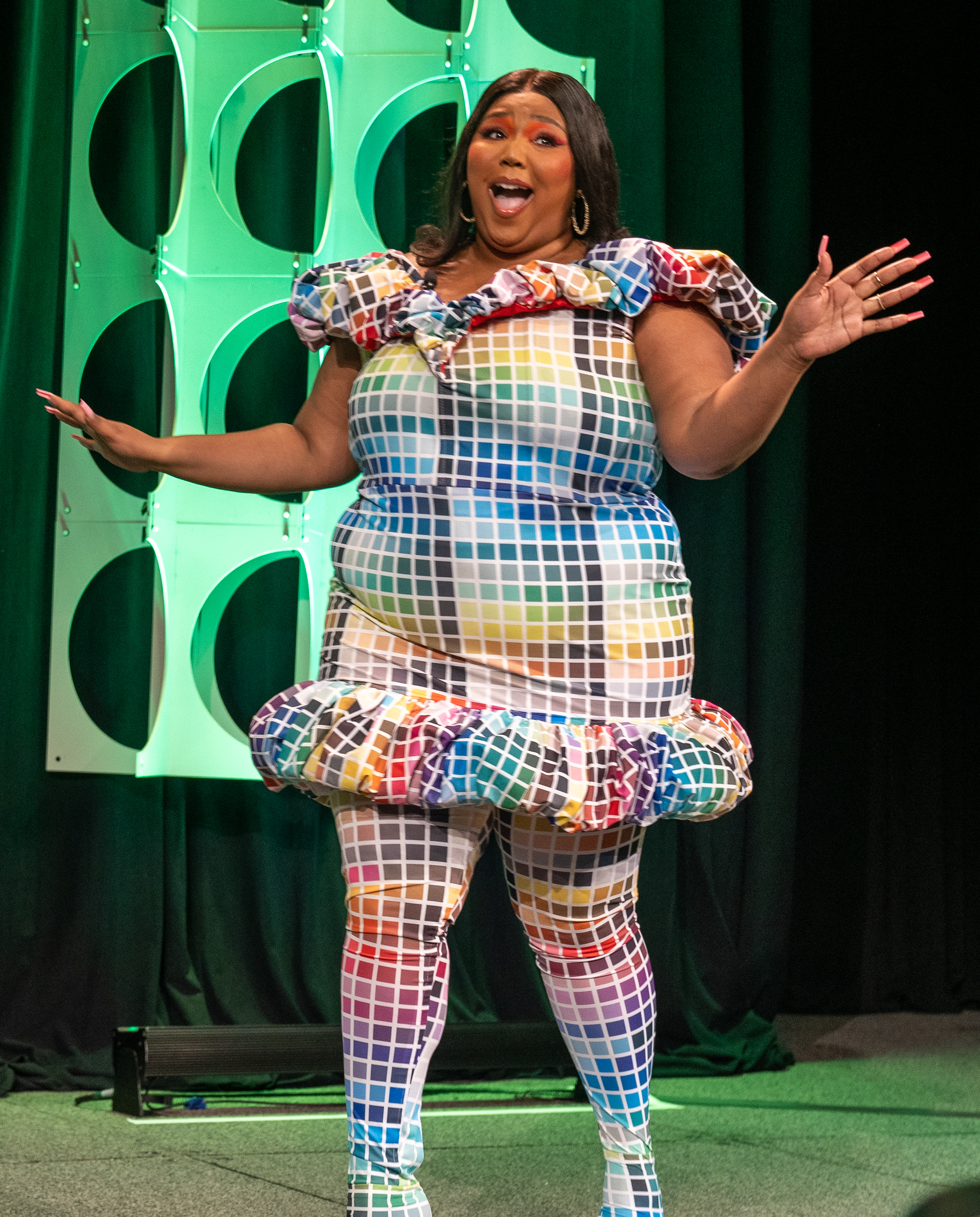
Lizzo at the 2022 South by Southwest festival

On August 2, 2021, Lizzo announced the beginning of a "new era" with the song "Rumors", which was released on August 13. In an interview with Variety, Lizzo said her upcoming album would be "a love album" and "one of the most musically badass, daring and sophisticated bodies of work I've done to date." The album was expected to be released in late 2022, though at the time of the interview Lizzo had not finished it yet. On March 23, 2022, Lizzo announced the single "About Damn Time" was to be released on April 14. After the song's release, Lizzo revealed the title for her fourth album, Special, and announced a release date of July 15.

She returned to Saturday Night Live as host and musical guest for the April 16, 2022, episode. On June 10, 2022, Lizzo released "Grrrls", the first promotional single from Special. The song's lyrics generated controversy because of the inclusion of the word "spaz". The line was eventually replaced with "hold me back", following a statement from Lizzo where she commented that "as a fat black woman in America, I've had many hurtful words used against me so I understand the power words can have (whether intentionally or in my case, unintentionally)".

On July 15, 2022, Lizzo released her fourth studio album, Special, which earned acclaim from music critics upon its release. Lizzoverse, an accompanying immersive cosmic light show experience set to Special, took place in New York City's Cipriani 25 Broadway and was livestreamed on Twitch. Following the release of Special, "About Damn Time" reached number one on the Billboard Hot 100 chart and maintained the position for two weeks. In February 2023, "About Damn Time" won the coveted "Record of the Year" at the 65th Annual Grammy Awards, making Lizzo's first win in the major categories.

Lizzo served as a contributing writer and producer on SZA's critically acclaimed second album SOS, co-writing the song "F2F". Lizzo also collaborated with SZA on the remix of the song "Special", the title track of her album of the same name. On December 17, 2022, Lizzo returned to Saturday Night Live for her third appearance as a musical guest, with Austin Butler hosting. Lizzo replaced the band Yeah Yeah Yeahs due to member Nick Zinner having pneumonia. In autumn, she embarked on The Special Tour across North America, Europe, and Oceania.

The 2023 film Barbie featured an original song from Lizzo titled "Pink". It was released on Barbie the Album on July 21 of the same year, with a second version used in the film titled "Pink (Bad Day)" released on July 29.

=== 2025–present: My Face Hurts from Smiling and Bitch ===
On February 15, 2025, Lizzo started teasing a new project titled "LIRL" by sharing a video clip on social media, slated with a release date on February 28. On February 28, 2025, she released the then-lead single and then-title track from her upcoming fifth studio album, "Love in Real Life". On June 24, 2025, she shared the track listing and cover art for her third mixtape, My Face Hurts from Smiling, which was released on June 27 by Nice Life Recording Company and Atlantic Records. Lizzo released "Don't Make Me Love U" on March 20, 2026, the new lead single from Bitch, her fifth studio album, which was released on June 5, 2026.

== Personal life ==
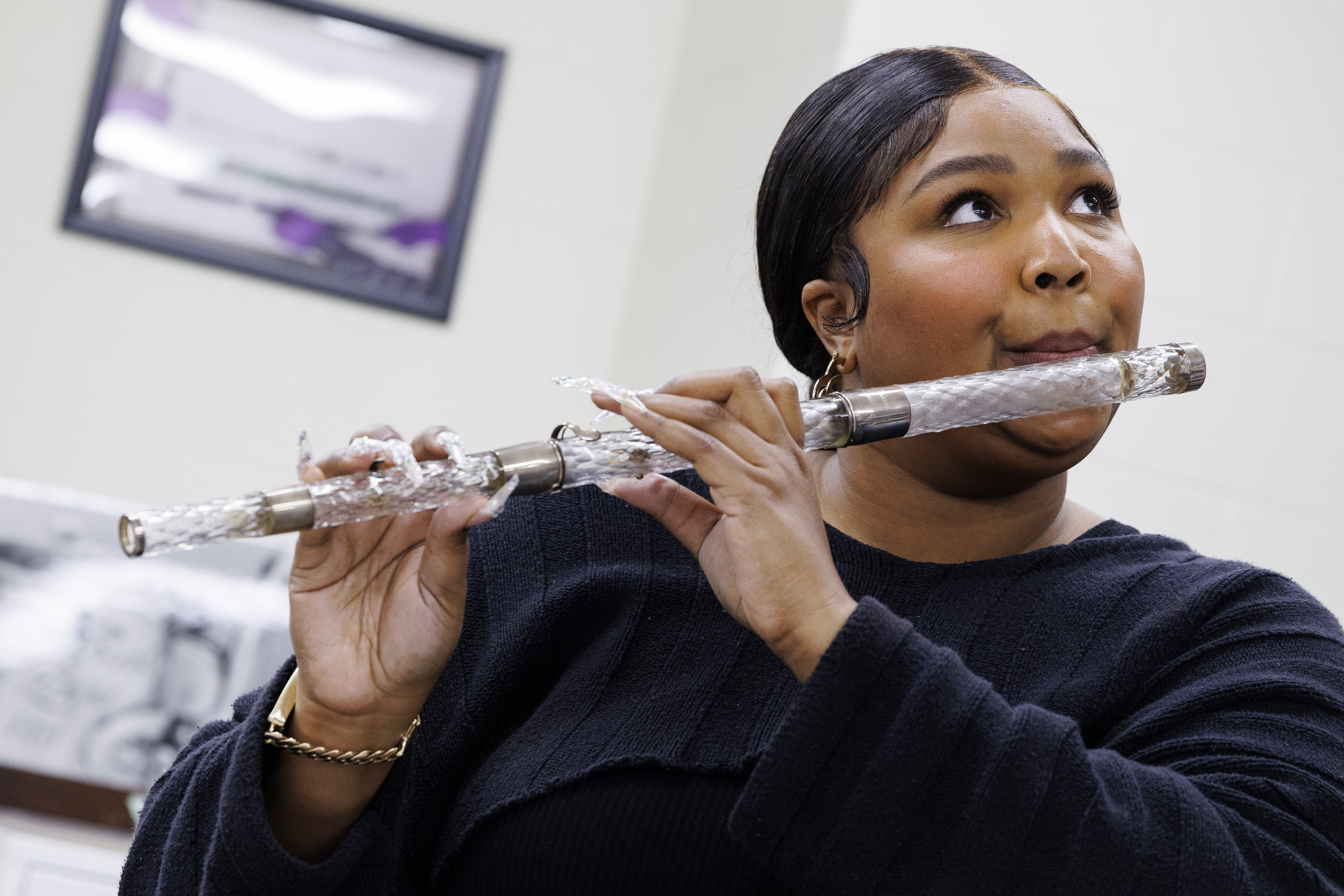
Lizzo plays a crystal flute from US President James Madison at the Library of Congress in 2022

When asked about her sexuality in a June 2018 interview, Lizzo said, "I personally don't ascribe [sic] to just one thing ... That's why the colors for LGBTQ+ are a rainbow! Because there's a spectrum and right now we try to keep it black and white. That's just not working for me." She has a strong LGBTQ+ following and has dubbed her fans "Lizzbians". She later stated that she considers herself an ally and "leans heterosexual".

Throughout her career, Lizzo has been subject to body shaming due to her obesity. She is considered a role model and advocate for body positivity and self-confidence. She partially credits social media, and the Internet in general, for changing the narrative around size and giving visibility to overweight women. In March 2025, Lizzo posted a video revealing that she had gradually achieved significant weight loss. She has been doing daily fitness routines since January 2024, while continuing to advocate for body positivity.

In December 2019, Lizzo sparked controversy at a Los Angeles Lakers game when she danced and twerked to her song "Juice" on camera while wearing a dress that revealed her thong. In an interview with CBS This Morning she said, "Anyone who knows me knows that this is how I've always been. This is how I've always liked to dress." On January 5, 2020, Lizzo stopped using Twitter; she cited "too many trolls" as the reason for her departure, adding: "I'll be back when I feel like it". Her Twitter account has since been updated by her management, while she remains active on her Instagram. Lizzo often discusses her mental health and its impact on her career.

Lizzo grew up attending the Church of God in Christ. In 2022, Lizzo was romantically linked to comedian Myke Wright.

In October 2021, she received criticism for calling Chris Brown her "favorite person in the whole fucking world", due to Brown's various convictions.

=== Misconduct allegations ===
In August 2023, three former backup dancers filed a lawsuit against Lizzo, her production company, and her dance captain Shirlene Quigley, accusing them of sexual, religious, and racial harassment, disability discrimination, assault, false imprisonment, creating a hostile work environment, and weight-shaming. Following the allegations, a former creative director for Lizzo and another former backup dancer showed support for the three claimants, saying they both had similar experiences working with Lizzo.

Filmmaker Sophia Nahli Allison released a statement supporting the dancers. The director traveled with Lizzo in 2019 for her documentary but dropped out of the project. Allison wrote, "I witnessed how arrogant, self-centered, and unkind she is... reading these reports made me realize how dangerous of a situation it was."

Lizzo has denied the allegations made against her, calling them "unbelievable" and "too outrageous not to be addressed".

On September 21, another similar lawsuit was filed against Lizzo and her management team, alleging further inappropriate behavior backstage, including sexual and racial harassment, disability discrimination, assault, drug use, and illegal retaliatory termination. The plaintiff, clothing designer Asha Daniels, had previously worked with Lizzo on her tour for her fourth studio album Special. Lizzo once again denied the allegations, with her spokesperson calling it an "absurd publicity-stunt lawsuit". In December 2024, Los Angeles district judge Fernando Aenlle-Rocha ruled that Daniels could not sue Lizzo and her tour manager Carlina Gugliotta as individuals, dismissing all causes of action against both. Aenlle-Rocha also dismissed several of Daniels' other claims, as she toured with Lizzo in Europe where American employment laws are not applicable. Lizzo's company, Big Grrrl Big Touring, remains a defendant in the lawsuit.

In February 2024, a Los Angeles judge rejected a request by Lizzo to end the three backup dancers' case against her, though he dismissed some charges including one claim that Lizzo had allegedly fat-shamed one of the former dancers, and another that Lizzo's team had allegedly discriminated against a person with disability. However, some sexual harassment and racial and religious discrimination allegations made against Lizzo and Shirlene Quigley, the captain of the singer's dance team, were upheld by the judge.

=== Politics ===
She donated $500,000 to Planned Parenthood after the United States Supreme Court overturned Roe v. Wade in Dobbs v. Jackson Women's Health Organization (2022).

Lizzo endorsed Kamala Harris for the 2024 U.S. presidential election.

== Artistry ==
While Lizzo's music is predominantly pop, hip-hop, and R&B, her songs also incorporate funk-pop and soul. Lizzo's influences include Missy Elliott, Lauryn Hill, and Beyoncé. Primarily starting as a rapper, Lizzo incorporated singing into her debut record. She stated in an interview in 2018, "I was always afraid of being a singer, but then when I heard Lauryn Hill, I was like, maybe I can do both", adding that her debut album was inspired by The Miseducation of Lauryn Hill, and Hill's "rapping, singing, being political." She has cited Diana Ross as a fashion reference.

In an article for The Guardian in 2019, writer Leonie Cooper credited Lizzo for "the woodwind renaissance" as "the flute's brightest champion" in the mainstream.

== Discography ==
- Lizzobangers (2013)
- Big Grrrl Small World (2015)
- Cuz I Love You (2019)
- Special (2022)
- Bitch (2026)

== Filmography ==
Film
Year	Title	Role	Notes
2019	UglyDolls	Lydia	Voice role
2019	Hustlers	Liz	
2022	Love, Lizzo	Herself	HBO Max documentary
2023	Renaissance: A Film by Beyoncé	Herself	Documentary

Television
Year	Title	Role	Notes
2016	Brad Neely's Harg Nallin' Sclopio Peepio	Herself	4 episodes
2016	Wonderland	Host	10 episodes
2018	Yeti! Yeti!	Magic Mushroom	
2022	Lizzo's Watch Out for the Big Grrrls	Host	
2022	Lizzo: Live in Concert	Herself	HBO Max concert special
2023	The Mandalorian	The Duchess of Plazir-15	Episode: "Chapter 22: Guns for Hire"
2023	The Simpsons	Goobie-Woo/Herself	Episode: "Homer's Adventures Through the Windshield Glass"

Guest appearances as herself
Year	Title	Notes
2014	Made in Chelsea: NYC	S01E04 – "Do Not Involve Me In Your Slutty Board Game"
2014	Late Show with David Letterman	S22E29 – "Robert Downey Jr./Sarah Paulson/Lizzo"
2015	Access Hollywood	
2015	The Late Show with Stephen Colbert	S01E56
2016	Sooo Many White Guys	1 episode; podcast
2016	The Real	1 episode
2016	Party Legends	"Make Mistakes"
2016	Full Frontal with Samantha Bee	S01E30 – "Post-Election"
2017, 2018	Trivial Takedown	2 episodes
2018	Articulate with Jim Cotter	"Caroline Shaw, Lizzo, Robert Janz"
2018	Hannibal Buress: Handsome Rambler	Episode No. 53, "The Lizzo Episode" (podcast)
2018	RuPaul's Drag Race	Season 10, episode 10
2019	The Ellen DeGeneres Show	1 episode
2019	The Tonight Show Starring Jimmy Fallon	1 episode
2019	The Daily Show with Trevor Noah	April 18, 2019
2019	2 Dope Queens	1 episode; podcast
2019	C à vous	1 episode
2019	Neo Magazin Royale	1 episode
2019	The Jonathan Ross Show	1 episode
2019, 2022	Saturday Night Live	Episodes: "Eddie Murphy/Lizzo", "Lizzo", "Austin Butler/Lizzo"
2020	My Next Guest Needs No Introduction with David Letterman	S3E4 – "Lizzo"
2020	The Eric Andre Show	Season 5, episode 4
2022	RuPaul's Drag Race	Season 14, episode 1
2022	The Proud Family: Louder and Prouder	S1E5 – "Snackland" (voice)

== Concert tours ==
Headlining

- Good as Hell Tour (2017)
- Cuz I Love You Tour (2019)
- Cuz I Love You Too Tour (2019–2020)
- The Special Tour (2022–2023)

Supporting

- Haim – Sister Sister Sister Tour (2018)
- Florence and the Machine – High as Hope Tour (2018)

== See also ==
- List of artists who reached number one in the United States
- South Park: The End of Obesity
