= Nice Life Recording Company =

American record label

- Parent company: Atlantic Records
- Founder: Ricky Reed
- Genre: Pop
- Country of origin: United States
- Location: Los Angeles, CA
- Official website: nice.life

Nice Life Recording Company is a Los Angeles–based record label and publishing company founded by producer Ricky Reed. Collectively, Nice Life artists and songwriters have won or been nominated for a wide variety of awards including Grammy Awards, American Music Awards, Billboard Music Awards, Country Music Association Awards, BET Awards, and iHeartRadio Music Awards.

== History ==
Nice Life's launch was officially announced in March 2016 as a joint venture with Atlantic Records. Reed was initially approached by Atlantic CEO Craig Kallman in 2014 who proposed a partnership, citing producers who have worked closely with labels historically. The company's name was inspired by a phrase that Reed's former manager would use frequently. Soon after its formation, Nice Life added Lizzo as its first signee. Since then the label has added the Marías, John-Robert (in partnership with Warner Records), Junior Mesa, and St. Panther among others.

In September 2019, Nice Life entered into a joint venture with music publisher Big Deal Music Group (which has since been acquired by Hipgnosis) to administer their publishing catalog and contribute to new songwriter signings.

== Artists ==
=== Label ===
- Tinashe
- TisaKorean
- Ambar Lucid
- John-Robert
- Lizzo
- The Marías
- Pussy Riot
- Ricky Reed
- Facing New York
- Junior Mesa
- St. Panther
- Nate Mercereau

=== Publishing ===
- Alan Vega
- Bigman
- Billy Lemos
- Cara Salimando
- DJ Stanfill
- Joe London
- John-Robert
- King Garbage
- Nate Mercereau
- Phoelix
- St. Panther
- Tele
- Tom Peyton
