= The Special Tour =

2022–23 concert tour by Lizzo

- Tour by Lizzo
- Location: North America; Europe; Oceania; Asia
- Associated album: Special
- Start date: September 23, 2022
- End date: July 30, 2023
- No. of shows: 80
- Supporting acts: Latto; Saucy Santana; Bree Runway; Joy Crookes; Tkay Maidza; Tinashe

Lizzo concert chronology
- Cuz I Love You Too Tour (2019–20); The Special Tour (2022–23); ...

The Special Tour was the third concert tour and first arena tour by American singer and rapper Lizzo, in support of her fourth studio album Special (2022). The tour began at the FLA Live Arena in Sunrise, Florida on September 23, 2022, and concluded at the Fuji Rock Festival on July 30, 2023.

American rappers Latto and Saucy Santana supported all the North American dates on the tour. English rapper Bree Runway and English singer-songwriter Joy Crookes supported select dates on the European leg of the tour while Tkay Maidza supported dates in Oceania.

== Concert film ==
Lizzo: Live in Concert is a concert special directed by Sam Wrench, which was released on December 31, 2022, exclusively via HBO Max. The film follows American singer and rapper Lizzo's performance at Kia Forum in Inglewood, California on November 18 and 19, 2022.

== Setlist ==
This set list is from the show in Perth, Australia on July 14, 2023. It is not intended to represent all tour dates.

=== 2022 ===
1. "The Sign”
2. ”2 Be Loved (Am I Ready)”
3. ”Soulmate”
4. ”Phone”
5. “Grrrls”
6. ”Boys”
7. ”Tempo”
8. ”Rumors”
9. ”Fitness” (interlude)
10. ”Naked”
11. ”Jerome”
12. ”Break Up Twice”
13. ”Special”
14. I Am Every Woman” (Chaka Khan Cover)
15. ”Like A Girl”
16. ”Birthday Girl”
17. ”Everybody’s Gay”
18. ”Water Me”
19. ”Cuz I Love You”
20. ”Coldplay”
21. ”Truth Hurts”
22. ”I Love You Bitch
23. ”Good As Hell”
24. ”Juice”
25. ”About Damn Time”

=== 2023 ===
1. ”Cuz I Love You”
2. ”Juice”
3. ”2 Be Loved (Am I Ready)”
4. ”Soulmate”
5. ”Phone” / “Grrrls”
6. ”Boys”
7. ”Tempo”
8. ”Rumors”
9. ”Jerome”
10. ”Special”
11. ”Like A Girl”
12. ”Birthday Girl”
13. Flute Interlude
14. ”Yellow” (Coldplay Cover)
15. ”Truth Hurts”
16. ”I Love You Bitch
17. ”Good As Hell”
18. ”About Damn Time”

Notes

- During the first performance in Inglewood, Missy Elliott and Cardi B joined Lizzo on stage to sing "Tempo" and "Rumors", respectively.
- During the show in Atlanta, Stacey Abrams joined Latto on-stage in support of her 2022 gubernatorial campaign.
- During the show in Knoxville, several drag queens including Aquaria, Kandy Muse, Asia O'Hara and Vanessa Vanjie Mateo joined Lizzo onstage to perform "Everybody's Gay", in protest of the controversial Tennessee anti-drag law.
- During the show in Phoenix, Lizzo performed a cover of Creedence Clearwater Revival's "Proud Mary".

== Shows ==
List of concerts
Date	City	Country	Venue	Opening act(s)
September 23, 2022	Sunrise	United States	FLA Live Arena	Latto; Saucy Santana
September 24, 2022	Tampa	United States	Amalie Arena	Saucy Santana
September 27, 2022	Washington, D.C.	United States	Capital One Arena	Latto
September 29, 2022	Philadelphia	United States	Wells Fargo Center	Latto; Saucy Santana
September 30, 2022	Boston	United States	TD Garden	Latto
October 2, 2022	New York City	United States	Madison Square Garden	Latto
October 3, 2022	New York City	United States	Madison Square Garden	Latto
October 6, 2022	Detroit	United States	Little Caesars Arena	Latto; Saucy Santana
October 7, 2022	Toronto	Canada	Scotiabank Arena	Latto
October 11, 2022	Saint Paul	United States	Xcel Energy Center	Latto
October 14, 2022	Kansas City	United States	T-Mobile Center	Latto
October 16, 2022	Chicago	United States	United Center	Latto
October 18, 2022	Indianapolis	United States	Gainbridge Fieldhouse	Latto; Saucy Santana
October 20, 2022	Charlotte	United States	Spectrum Center	Latto
October 22, 2022	Atlanta	United States	State Farm Arena	Latto
October 23, 2022	Nashville	United States	Bridgestone Arena	Latto
October 25, 2022	Austin	United States	Moody Center	Latto
October 26, 2022	Houston	United States	Toyota Center	Latto; Saucy Santana
October 28, 2022	Dallas	United States	American Airlines Center	Latto
October 31, 2022	Denver	United States	Ball Arena	Latto
November 2, 2022	Salt Lake City	United States	Vivint Arena	Latto
November 4, 2022	Portland	United States	Moda Center	Latto
November 7, 2022	Vancouver	Canada	Rogers Arena	Latto
November 9, 2022	Seattle	United States	Climate Pledge Arena	Latto
November 10, 2022	Portland	United States	Moda Center	Latto
November 12, 2022	San Francisco	United States	Chase Center	Latto
November 18, 2022	Inglewood (Note: Billed as Los Angeles.)	United States	Kia Forum	Latto
November 19, 2022	Inglewood	United States	Kia Forum	Latto
February 17, 2023	Oslo	Norway	Spektrum	Bree Runway
February 18, 2023	Copenhagen	Denmark	Royal Arena	Bree Runway
February 20, 2023	Hamburg	Germany	Barclays Arena	Bree Runway
February 23, 2023	Amsterdam	Netherlands	Ziggo Dome	Bree Runway
February 24, 2023	Antwerp	Belgium	Sportpaleis	Bree Runway
February 27, 2023	Cologne	Germany	Lanxess Arena	Bree Runway
February 28, 2023	Berlin	Germany	Mercedes-Benz Arena	Bree Runway
March 2, 2023	Assago (Note: Billed as Milan.)	Italy	Mediolanum Forum	Bree Runway
March 3, 2023	Zurich	Switzerland	Hallenstadion	Bree Runway
March 5, 2023	Paris	France	Accor Arena	Bree Runway
March 8, 2023	Glasgow	Scotland	OVO Hydro	Joy Crookes
March 9, 2023	Birmingham	England	Utilita Arena	Joy Crookes
March 11, 2023	Manchester	England	AO Arena	Joy Crookes
March 13, 2023	Dublin	Ireland	3Arena	Joy Crookes
March 15, 2023	London	England	The O_{2} Arena	Joy Crookes
March 16, 2023	London	England	The O_{2} Arena	Joy Crookes
April 21, 2023	Knoxville	United States	Thompson-Boling Arena	Latto
April 22, 2023	Lexington	United States	Rupp Arena	Latto
April 24, 2023	Memphis	United States	FedEx Forum	Latto
April 25, 2023	St. Louis	United States	Enterprise Center	Latto
April 28, 2023 (Note: Part of New Orleans Jazz & Heritage Festival.)	New Orleans	United States	Fair Grounds Race Course	—N/a
May 9, 2023	Baltimore	United States	CFG Bank Arena	Latto
May 10, 2023	Raleigh	United States	PNC Arena	Latto
May 12, 2023	Cleveland	United States	Rocket Mortgage FieldHouse	Latto
May 13, 2023	Pittsburgh	United States	PPG Paints Arena	Latto
May 16, 2023	Milwaukee	United States	Fiserv Forum	Latto
May 17, 2023	Chicago	United States	United Center	Latto
May 19, 2023	Omaha	United States	CHI Health Center Omaha	Latto
May 20, 2023	Tulsa	United States	BOK Center	Latto
May 24, 2023	Phoenix	United States	Footprint Center	Latto
May 25, 2023	San Diego	United States	Viejas Arena	Latto
May 28, 2023	Sacramento	United States	Golden 1 Center	Latto
June 2, 2023	Thousand Palms (Note: Billed as Palm Springs.)	United States	Acrisure Arena	Latto
June 11, 2023	Montreal	Canada	Bell Centre	Latto
June 13, 2023	Hartford	United States	XL Center	Latto
June 22, 2023 (Note: Part of the Belsonic.)	Belfast	Northern Ireland	Ormeau Park	Tinashe
June 24, 2023 (Note: Part of the Glastonbury Festival 2023.)	Pilton	England	Worthy Farm	—N/a
June 28, 2023 (Note: Part of the Open'er Festival.)	Gdynia	Poland	Gdynia-Kosakowo Airport	—N/a
June 30, 2023 (Note: Part of Lollapalooza Stockholm.)	Stockholm	Sweden	Gärdet	—N/a
July 1, 2023 (Note: Part of the Roskilde Festival.)	Roskilde	Denmark	Roskilde Dyrskueplads	—N/a
July 6, 2023 (Note: Part of the Mad Cool festival.)	Madrid	Spain	Espacio Mad Cool Villaverde	—N/a
July 7, 2023 (Note: Part of the NOS Live festival.)	Lisbon	Portugal	Passeio Marítimo de Algés	—N/a
July 9, 2023 (Note: Part of the North Sea Jazz Festival.)	Rotterdam	Netherlands	Rotterdam Ahoy	—N/a
July 14, 2023	Perth	Australia	RAC Arena	Tkay Maidza
July 17, 2023	Melbourne	Australia	Rod Laver Arena	Tkay Maidza
July 18, 2023	Melbourne	Australia	Rod Laver Arena	Tkay Maidza
July 21, 2023 (Note: Part of Splendour in the Grass.)	Byron Bay	Australia	North Byron Parklands	—N/a
July 23, 2023	Sydney	Australia	Qudos Bank Arena	Tkay Maidza
July 24, 2023	Sydney	Australia	Qudos Bank Arena	Tkay Maidza
July 26, 2023	Auckland	New Zealand	Spark Arena	Tkay Maidza
July 30, 2023 (Note: Part of Fuji Rock Festival.)	Niigata	Japan	Naeba Ski Resort	—N/a

=== Cancelled dates ===
List of cancelled concerts
Date	City	Country	Venue	Reason
July 3, 2023 (Note: Part of Luxexpo Open Air series of concerts.)	Luxembourg	Luxembourg	Luxexpo The Box	Unknown
