= List of awards and nominations received by Lizzo =

Lizzo awards and nominations
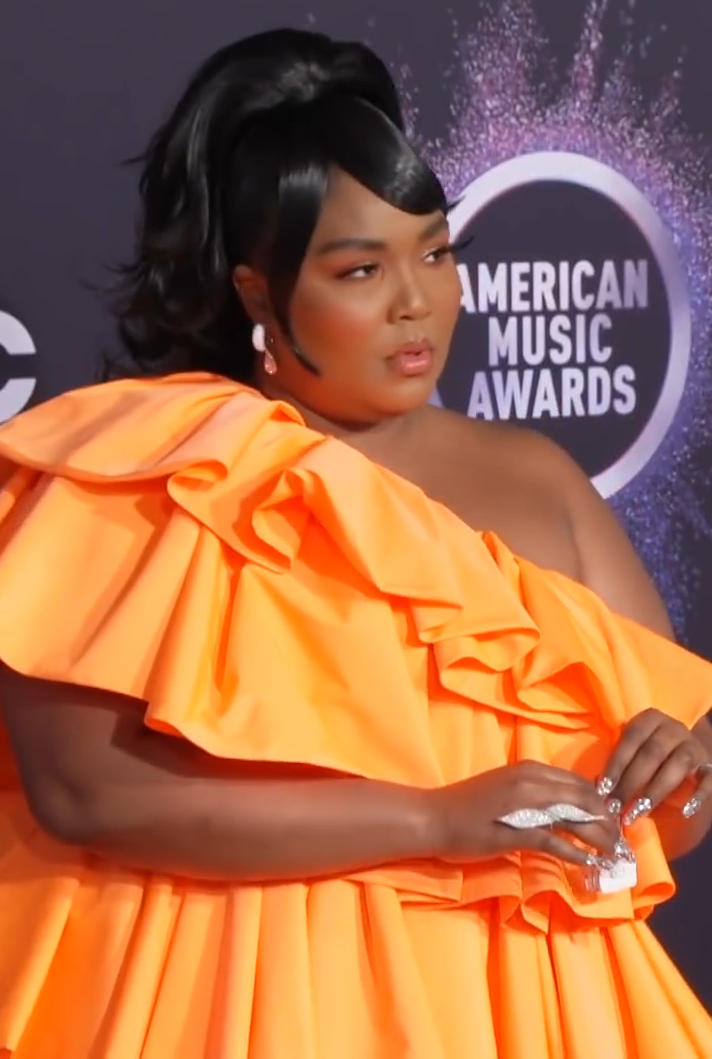
- Lizzo in 2019
Awards and nominations
Award	Wins	Nominations
American Music Awards	0	5
Apple Music Awards	1	1
ARIA Music Awards	0	1
BET Awards	1	9
BET Hip Hop Awards	0	2
Billboard Music Awards	1	11
BRIT Awards	0	3
Grammy Awards	4	13
Hollywood Critics Association Creative Arts TV Awards	0	1
iHeartRadio Music Awards	4	13
LOS40 Music Awards	0	2
MTV Europe Music Awards	0	7
MTV Video Music Awards	1	12
Nickelodeon Kid's Choice Awards	0	5
People's Choice Awards	2	6
Primetime Emmy Awards	1	1
Soul Train Music Awards	4	17

Totals (Note: Certain award groups do not simply award one winner. They acknowledge several different recipients, have runners-up, and have third place. Since this is a specific recognition and is different from losing an award, runner-up mentions are considered wins in this award tally. For simplification and to avoid errors, each award in this list has been presumed to have had a prior nomination.)
- Wins: 27
- Nominations: 124

Lizzo is the recipient of a number of awards, including four Grammy Awards, a Primetime Emmy Award, four Soul Train Music Awards, a Billboard Music Awards, a BET Award, four iHeartRadio Music Awards, which includes the accomplishment of reaching 1 Billion Total Audience Spins plaques for "Truth Hurts" and "Good as Hell", and a Guinness World Record. At the 62nd Annual Grammy Awards she received eight nominations, the most for any artist that year, including for Album of the Year for the deluxe version of Cuz I Love You, Record of the Year and Song of the Year for "Truth Hurts", winning the categories Best Urban Contemporary Album, Best Traditional R&B Performance for "Jerome" and Best Pop Solo Performance.

== Awards and nominations ==
Award	Year (Note: Indicates the year of ceremony. Each year is linked to the article about the awards held that year, wherever possible.)	Recipient(s) and nominee(s)	Category	Result	Ref.
American Music Awards	2019	Herself	New Artist of the Year	Nominated	
American Music Awards	2019	Herself	Favorite Female Artist – Soul/R&B	Nominated	
American Music Awards	2019	"Juice"	Favorite Song – Soul/R&B	Nominated	
American Music Awards	2022	Herself	Favorite Female Pop Artist	Nominated	
American Music Awards	2022	"About Damn Time"	Favorite Pop Song	Nominated	
Apple Music Awards	2019	Herself	Breakthrough Artist of the Year	Won	
ARIA Music Awards	2020	Cuz I Love You	Best International Artist	Nominated	
Berlin Music Video Awards	2023	SPECIAL	Best Concept	Nominated	
BET Awards	2019	Herself	Best Female Hip-Hop Artist	Nominated	
BET Awards	2020	Herself	Best Female Hip-Hop Artist	Nominated	
BET Awards	2020	Herself	Best Female R&B/Pop Artist	Won	
BET Awards	2020	Cuz I Love You	Album of the Year	Nominated	
BET Awards	2020	"Tempo"	BET Her Award	Nominated	
BET Awards	2023	"Special"	BET Her Award	Nominated	
BET Hip Hop Awards	2019	Cuz I Love You	Album of the Year	Nominated	
BET Hip Hop Awards	2019	"Tempo"	Impact Track	Nominated	
Billboard Music Awards	2020	Herself	Top Female Artist	Nominated	
Billboard Music Awards	2020	Herself	Top New Artist	Nominated	
Billboard Music Awards	2020	Herself	Top Song Sales Artist	Won	
Billboard Music Awards	2020	Herself	Top R&B Artist	Nominated	
Billboard Music Awards	2020	Herself	Top Female R&B Artist	Nominated	
Billboard Music Awards	2020	"Truth Hurts"	Top Hot 100 Song	Nominated	
Billboard Music Awards	2020	"Truth Hurts"	Top Rap Song	Nominated	
Billboard Music Awards	2020	"Truth Hurts"	Top Selling Song	Nominated	
Billboard Music Awards	2020	"Truth Hurts"	Top Radio Song	Nominated	
Billboard Music Awards	2020	"Good as Hell"	Top R&B Song	Nominated	
BMI Pop Awards	2020	"Truth Hurts"	Award Winning Songs	Won	
BMI R&B/Hip-Hop Awards	2020	"Good As Hell"	Award Winning Songs	Won	
BMI R&B/Hip-Hop Awards	2020	"Truth Hurts"	Award Winning Songs	Won	
Bravo Otto	2019	Herself	Newcomer	Nominated	
Brit Awards	2020	Herself	International Female Solo Artist	Nominated	
Brit Awards	2023	Herself	International Artist	Nominated	
Brit Awards	2023	"About Damn Time"	International Song	Nominated	
Clio Awards	2019	"Juice"	Music Video (Silver)	Won	
European Festival Awards	2019	Herself	Newcomer of the Year	Nominated	
Global Awards	2020	Herself	Rising Star Award	Nominated	
Global Awards	2020	Herself	Best Female	Nominated	
Grammy Awards	2020	"Truth Hurts"	Record of the Year	Nominated	
Grammy Awards	2020	"Truth Hurts"	Song of the Year	Nominated	
Grammy Awards	2020	"Truth Hurts"	Best Pop Solo Performance	Won	
Grammy Awards	2020	Cuz I Love You (Deluxe)	Album of the Year	Nominated	
Grammy Awards	2020	Cuz I Love You (Deluxe)	Best Urban Contemporary Album	Won	
Grammy Awards	2020	Herself	Best New Artist	Nominated	
Grammy Awards	2020	"Exactly How I Feel"	Best R&B Performance	Nominated	
Grammy Awards	2020	"Jerome"	Best Traditional R&B Performance	Won	
Grammy Awards	2023	"About Damn Time"	Record of the Year	Won	
Grammy Awards	2023	"About Damn Time"	Song of the Year	Nominated	
Grammy Awards	2023	"About Damn Time"	Best Pop Solo Performance	Nominated	
Grammy Awards	2023	Special	Album of the Year	Nominated	
Grammy Awards	2023	Special	Best Pop Vocal Album	Nominated	
Guinness World Records	2019	"Truth Hurts"	Most weeks at No.1 on the US singles charts for a rap single by a female artist	Won	
Hollywood Critics Association Creative Arts TV Awards	2023	The Mandalorian	Best Guest Actress in a Drama Series	Nominated	
iHeartRadio Music Awards	2020	Herself	Female Artist of the Year	Nominated	
iHeartRadio Music Awards	2020	Herself	Best New Pop Artist	Won	
iHeartRadio Music Awards	2020	Herself	Best New Hip-Hop Artist	Nominated	
iHeartRadio Music Awards	2020	"Truth Hurts"	Song of the Year	Won	
iHeartRadio Music Awards	2020	"Juice"	Best Lyrics	Nominated	
iHeartRadio Music Awards	2020	"Good as Hell (Remix)" (featuring Ariana Grande)	Best Remix	Nominated	
iHeartRadio Music Awards	2023	"About Damn Time"	Best Lyrics	Nominated	
iHeartRadio Music Awards	2023	"About Damn Time"	TikTok Bop of the Year	Nominated	
iHeartRadio Music Awards	2023	"About Damn Time"	Song of the Year	Nominated	
iHeartRadio Music Awards	2023	"Love, Lizzo"	Favorite Documentary	Nominated	
iHeartRadio Music Awards	2023	"Break Up Twice"	Favorite Use of a Sample	Nominated	
iHeartRadio Music Awards	2023	Herself	Favorite Tour Style	Nominated	
iHeartRadio Music Awards	2023	Herself	Artist of the Year	Nominated	
iHeartRadio Titanium Awards	2020	"Truth Hurts"	1 Billion Total Audience Spins on iHeartRadio Stations	Won	
iHeartRadio Titanium Awards	2020	"Good as Hell"	1 Billion Total Audience Spins on iHeartRadio Stations	Won	
LOS40 Music Awards	2022	"About Damn Time"	Best International Song	Nominated	
LOS40 Music Awards	2022	"About Damn Time"	Best International Video	Nominated	
MTV Europe Music Awards	2019	Herself	Best New Act	Nominated	
MTV Europe Music Awards	2019	Herself	Best Push Act	Nominated	
MTV Europe Music Awards	2019	Herself	Best US Act	Nominated	
MTV Video Music Awards	2019	Herself	Best New Artist	Nominated	
MTV Video Music Awards	2019	Herself	Push Artist of the Year	Nominated	
MTV Video Music Awards	2019	"Tempo"	Best Power Anthem	Nominated	
MTV Video Music Awards	2019	"Truth Hurts"	Song of Summer	Nominated	
MTV Video Music Awards	2020	"Cuz I Love You"	Best R&B	Nominated	
MTV Video Music Awards	2020	"Good as Hell"	Best Editing	Nominated	
MTV Video Music Awards	2021	"Rumors" (featuring Cardi B)	Song of Summer	Nominated	
MTV Video Music Awards	2022	Herself	Artist of the Year	Nominated	
MTV Video Music Awards	2022	"About Damn Time"	Song of the Year	Nominated	
MTV Video Music Awards	2022	"About Damn Time"	Best Pop	Nominated	
MTV Video Music Awards	2022	"About Damn Time"	Video for Good	Won	
MTV Video Music Awards	2022	"About Damn Time"	Song of Summer	Nominated	
Nickelodeon Kids' Choice Awards	2020	Herself	Favorite Breakout Artist	Nominated	
Nickelodeon Kids' Choice Awards	2022	"Rumors" (with Cardi B)	Favorite Collaboration	Nominated	
Nickelodeon Kids' Choice Awards	2023	Herself	Favorite Female Artist	Nominated	
Nickelodeon Kids' Choice Awards	2023	"About Damn Time"	Favorite Song	Nominated	
Nickelodeon Kids' Choice Awards	2023	"Special	Favorite Album	Nominated	
NME Awards	2020	Herself	Best Live Act	Nominated	
NME Awards	2020	Herself	Best Solo Act in the World	Nominated	
NME Awards	2020	"Juice"	Best Song in the World	Nominated	
People's Choice Awards	2019	Cuz I Love You	Album of 2019	Nominated	
People's Choice Awards	2022	Herself	Female Artist of 2022	Nominated	
People's Choice Awards	2022	"About Damn Time"	Song of 2022	Won	
People's Choice Awards	2022	Special	Album of 2022	Nominated	
People's Choice Awards	2022	Herself	People's Champion 2022	Won	
People's Choice Awards	2022	"Lizzo's Watch Out for the Big Grrrls"	Competition Show of 2022	Nominated	
People's Choice Awards	2022	Herself	Social Celebrity of 2022	Nominated	
Popjustice £20 Music Prize	2019	"Blame It on Your Love" (with Charli XCX)	Best British Pop Single	Nominated	
Primetime Emmy Awards	2022	Lizzo's Watch Out for the Big Grrrls	Outstanding Competition Program (Note: as Executive Producer)	Won	
Q Awards	2019	"Juice"	Best Track	Nominated	
Queerty Awards	2020	Herself	Badass	Runner-up	
Queerty Awards	2020	"Juice"	Anthem	Won	
Rolling Stone's International Music Awards	2019	Herself	Style	Won	
Soul Train Music Awards	2019	"Juice"	Song of the Year	Nominated	
Soul Train Music Awards	2019	"Juice"	Video of the Year	Won	
Soul Train Music Awards	2019	"Juice"	The Ashford and Simpson Songwriter's Award	Nominated	
Soul Train Music Awards	2019	"Juice"	Best Dance Performance	Nominated	
Soul Train Music Awards	2019	Cuz I Love You	Album/Mixtape of the Year	Won	
Soul Train Music Awards	2019	Herself	Best R&B/Soul Female Artist	Nominated	
Soul Train Music Awards	2020	"Good as Hell"	Video of the Year	Nominated	
Soul Train Music Awards	2022	"About Damn Time"	Song of the Year	Nominated	
Soul Train Music Awards	2022	"About Damn Time"	Video of the Year	Nominated	
Soul Train Music Awards	2022	"About Damn Time"	Best Dance Performance	Won	
Soul Train Music Awards	2022	Special	Album/Mixtape of the Year	Nominated	
Soul Train Music Awards	2022	Herself	Best R&B/Soul Female Artist	Nominated	
Streamy Awards	2019	Herself	Breakthrough Artist	Nominated	
Teen Choice Awards	2019	Herself	Choice Breakout Artist	Nominated	
Teen Choice Awards	2019	Herself	Choice Summer Female Artist	Nominated	
Teen Choice Awards	2019	"Truth Hurts"	Choice Summer Song	Nominated	
The Streamer Awards	2026	WardrobeWinter and Lizzo	Best Mainstream Collab	Pending	
UK Music Video Awards	2019	Herself	Best Artist	Nominated	
Webby Awards	2023	Lizzo's Watch Out for the Big Grrrls	Best Web Personality/Host, Performances & Craft	Nominated	
Webby Awards	2023	Lizzo's Watch Out for the Big Grrrls	Arts & Entertainment, Social Video	Won	
