= Cuz I Love You Too Tour =

2019–20 concert tour by Lizzo

- Tour by Lizzo
- Promotional poster for the tour
- Associated album: Cuz I Love You
- Start date: July 18, 2019
- End date: January 15, 2020
- Legs: 3
- No. of shows: 53

Lizzo concert chronology
- Cuz I Love You Tour (2019); Cuz I Love You Too Tour (2019–20); The Special Tour (2022–23)

The Cuz I Love You Too Tour was the second headlining concert tour by American singer and rapper Lizzo in support of her third studio album, Cuz I Love You. The tour began on July 18, 2019, in Troutdale, Oregon, and concluded on January 15, 2020, in Auckland, New Zealand.

== Background and development ==
On April 22, 2019, Lizzo announced dates for the "Cuz I Love You Too Tour" tour. Ari Lennox, Empress Of, and DJ Sophia Eris were announced as opening acts. European dates were added in July.

== Setlist ==
This setlist is representative of the show on September 11, 2019, in Miami Beach. It does not represent all the shows from the tour.

1. "Heaven Help Me"
2. "Worship"
3. "Cuz I Love You"
4. "Exactly How I Feel"
5. "Scuse Me"
6. "Water Me"
7. "Jerome"
8. "Crybaby"
9. "Tempo"
10. "Boys"
11. "Like a Girl"
12. "Soulmate"
13. "Lingerie"
14. "Good as Hell"
15. "Truth Hurts"
  Encore
16. "Juice"

== Tour dates ==
List of concerts, showing date, city, country, venue, and opening acts
Date	City	Country	Venue	Opening act(s)
North America
July 18, 2019	Troutdale	United States	Edgefield	DJ Sophia Eris
July 19, 2019	Troutdale	United States	Edgefield	DJ Sophia Eris
September 7, 2019	New Orleans	United States	The Fillmore New Orleans	Ari Lennox
September 8, 2019	New Orleans	United States	The Fillmore New Orleans	Empress Of
September 10, 2019	St. Petersburg	United States	Jannus Live	Ari Lennox
September 11, 2019	Miami Beach	United States	The Fillmore Miami Beach	Ari Lennox
September 13, 2019	Raleigh	United States	Red Hat Amphitheater	Ari Lennox
September 15, 2019	Charlotte	United States	Charlotte Metro Credit Union Amphitheatre	Empress Of
September 17, 2019	Boston	United States	Agganis Arena	Ari Lennox
September 18, 2019	Philadelphia	United States	The Met Philadelphia	Ari Lennox
September 19, 2019	Toronto	Canada	Budweiser Stage	Ari Lennox
September 22, 2019	New York City	United States	Radio City Music Hall	Ari Lennox
September 24, 2019	New York City	United States	Radio City Music Hall	Ari Lennox
September 25, 2019	Washington, D.C.	United States	The Anthem	Ari Lennox
September 26, 2019	Washington, D.C.	United States	The Anthem	Ari Lennox
September 28, 2019	Chicago	United States	Byline Bank Aragon Ballroom	—N/a
September 29, 2019	Chicago	United States	Byline Bank Aragon Ballroom	Ari Lennox
September 30, 2019	Nashville	United States	Ryman Auditorium	Ari Lennox
October 2, 2019	Louisville	United States	The Louisville Palace	Ari Lennox
October 4, 2019	Houston	United States	Revention Music Center	Ari Lennox
October 5, 2019	Dallas	United States	Southside Ballroom	Ari Lennox
October 8, 2019	St. Louis	United States	The Pageant	Ari Lennox
October 9, 2019	Minneapolis	United States	The Armory	Ari Lennox
October 10, 2019	Madison	United States	The Sylvee	Ari Lennox
October 11, 2019	Minneapolis	United States	The Armory	Ari Lennox
October 15, 2019	Denver	United States	Fillmore Auditorium	Ari Lennox
October 16, 2019	Denver	United States	Fillmore Auditorium	Ari Lennox
October 18, 2019	Los Angeles	United States	Hollywood Palladium	Ari Lennox
October 20, 2019	Los Angeles	United States	Hollywood Palladium	Ari Lennox
October 21, 2019	Los Angeles	United States	Hollywood Palladium	Ari Lennox
October 23, 2019	Phoenix	United States	The Van Buren	Ari Lennox
October 24, 2019	San Diego	United States	CalCoast Credit Union Open Air Theatre	Empress Of
October 25, 2019	Las Vegas	United States	The Chelsea Ballroom	Ari Lennox
October 27, 2019	San Francisco	United States	Bill Graham Civic Auditorium	Empress Of
October 28, 2019	San Francisco	United States	Bill Graham Civic Auditorium	Empress Of
Europe
November 4, 2019	Paris	France	Salle Pleyel	—N/a
November 6, 2019	London	England	O_{2} Brixton Academy	—N/a
November 7, 2019	London	England	O_{2} Brixton Academy	—N/a
November 8, 2019	Glasgow	Scotland	O_{2} Academy Glasgow	—N/a
November 10, 2019	Dublin	Ireland	Olympia Theatre	—N/a
November 11, 2019	Manchester	England	O_{2} Victoria Warehouse	—N/a
November 13, 2019	Cologne	Germany	Palladium	—N/a
November 14, 2019	Berlin	Germany	Columbiahalle	—N/a
November 15, 2019	Munich	Germany	Tonhalle	—N/a
November 17, 2019	Amsterdam	Netherlands	AFAS Live	—N/a
November 19, 2019	Copenhagen	Denmark	K.B. Hallen	—N/a
Oceania
January 4, 2020 (Note: These concerts are part of the FOMO Festival.)	Brisbane	Australia	RNA Showgrounds	—N/a
January 5, 2020	Adelaide	Australia	Elder Park	—N/a
January 6, 2020	Sydney	Australia	Sydney Opera House	—N/a
January 8, 2020	Melbourne	Australia	Forum Theatre	—N/a
January 11, 2020	Sydney	Australia	Parramatta Park	—N/a
January 12, 2020	Melbourne	Australia	Royal Melbourne Showgrounds	—N/a
January 15, 2020	Auckland	New Zealand	The Trusts Arena	—N/a

== Cancelled shows ==
List of cancelled concerts, showing date, city, country, venue, and reason for cancellation
Date	City	Country	Venue	Reason
March 13, 2020 (Note: This concert was part of RodeoHouston.)	Houston	United States	NRG Stadium	COVID-19 pandemic
May 2, 2020 (Note: This concert is part of New Orleans Jazz & Heritage Festival.)	New Orleans	United States	Fair Grounds Race Course	COVID-19 pandemic
June 6, 2020 (Note: These concert were intended to be part of Virgin Fest 2020.)	Los Angeles	United States	Banc of California Stadium	COVID-19 pandemic
June 7, 2020	Los Angeles	United States	Banc of California Stadium	COVID-19 pandemic
June 13, 2020 (Note: This concert was intended to be part of Bonnaroo Music Festival.)	Manchester	United States	Great Stage Park	COVID-19 pandemic
August 1, 2020 (Note: This concert was intended to be part of Osheaga Festival.)	Montreal	Canada	Parc Jean-Drapeau	COVID-19 pandemic
