= JoCat =

American YouTuber and streamer

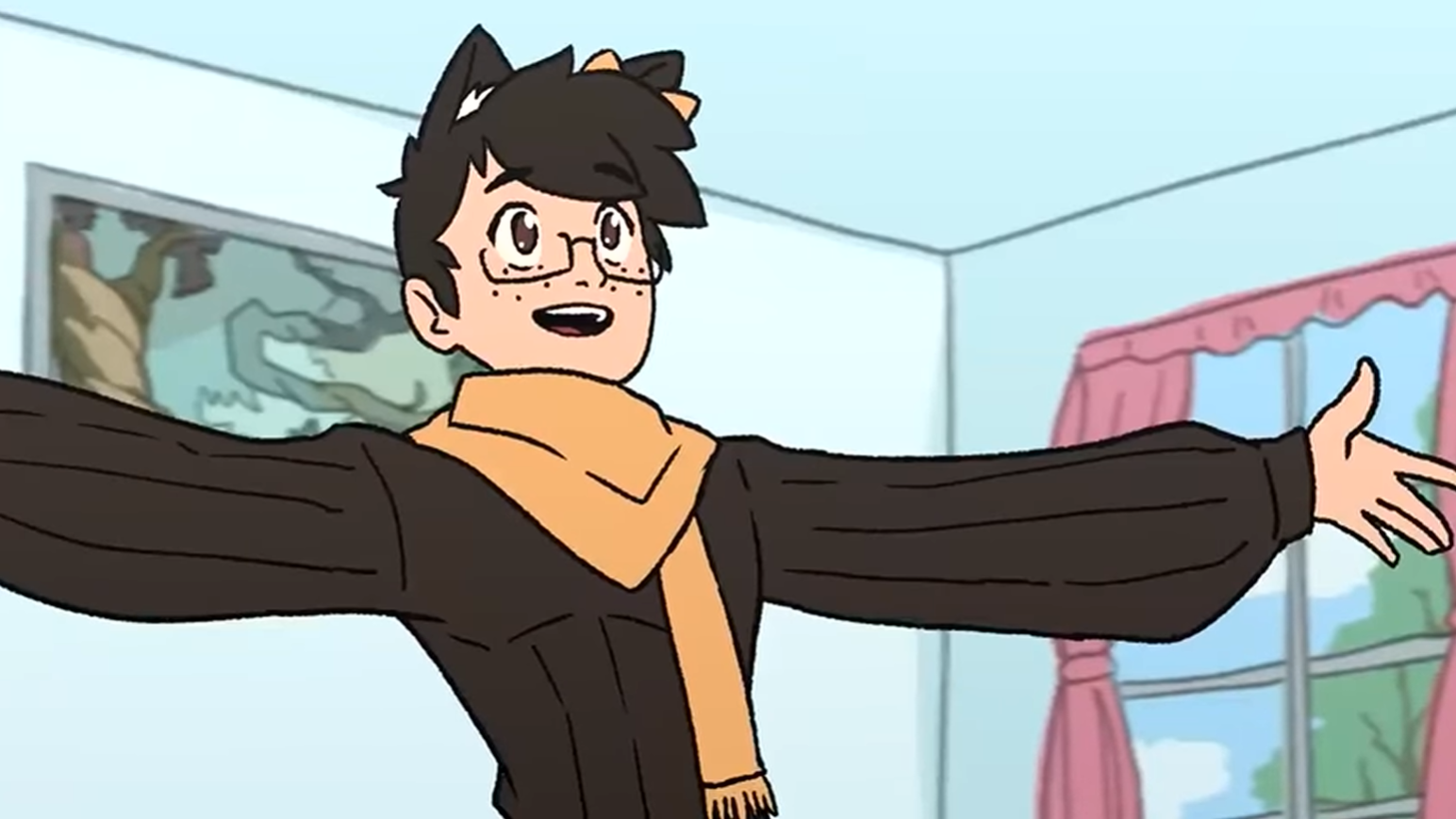
- JoCat's animated avatar
- Born: Joseph Catalanello
- Occupations: YouTuber; online streamer

Twitch information
- Channel: JoCat
- Years active: 2016–present
- Genre: Gaming
- Followers: 193 thousand

YouTube information
- Channel: JoCat
- Years active: 2018–present
- Genres: Animation; gaming; comedy; guides; music
- Subscribers: 1.23 million
- Views: 249 million
- Last updated: June 21, 2026
- Website: www.jocat.net

Joseph Catalanello, known online as JoCat, is an American YouTuber and Twitch streamer. He is best known for producing animated videos, livestreams, and other content related to Dungeons & Dragons and Final Fantasy XIV.

== Career ==
A Dungeons & Dragons-themed music video animated by JoCat

JoCat's YouTube channel gained popularity for a series of animated videos called Crap Guide. The Crap Guide series initially featured JoCat satirically explaining mechanics of the game Monster Hunter: World before expanding to covering other titles such as Dungeons & Dragons and Final Fantasy XIV. He has also produced animated video essays. JoCat also livestreams Dungeons & Dragons campaigns as well as Final Fantasy XIV gameplay on Twitch, and has used his livestreams to raise money for charities in support of LGBTQ+ rights. In 2024, he completed a year-long FFXIV boss gauntlet having raised over $60,000 for charity.

In 2021, JoCat created an animated music video parodying the song "Boys" by Lizzo. In the parody song, titled "I Like Girls", JoCat expressed his attraction to women with various body types. In 2023, JoCat faced widespread online harassment for the content of the video, including doxing attempts and threats of violence against him and his family. He also claimed that suspicious packages were mailed to his family. After these events, he chose to take an indefinite hiatus from content creation. He would later return to his channel in September 2024.

== Personal life ==
Catalanello is a graduate of the graphic design program at Louisiana Tech University and a resident of Ponchatoula, Louisiana. According to Makeship co-founder Pablo Eder, one of the most successful Makeship campaigns was a collaboration with JoCat, who used money from the campaign to buy his first house. In October 2023, Catalanello's partner, fellow artist and content creator Echo Gillette, proposed to him during their trip to Japan, and they got married on October 11, 2025.
