= Coconut Oil (EP) =

2016 EP by Lizzo

EP by Lizzo
- Released: October 7, 2016
- Genre: R&B
- Length: 19:28
- Labels: Atlantic; Nice Life
- Producers: Ricky Reed (also exec.); Christian Rich; Dubbel Dutch; Jesse Shatkin

Lizzo chronology
Big Grrrl Small World (2015)	Coconut Oil (2016)	Cuz I Love You (2019)

Singles from Coconut Oil
- 1. "Good as Hell" Released: March 8, 2016; 2. "Phone" Released: September 19, 2016

Coconut Oil is the debut solo extended play (EP) by American rapper and singer Lizzo. It was released on October 7, 2016, by Nice Life Recording Company and Atlantic Records, as Lizzo's first major-label release. Lizzo co-wrote each song on the album, while enlisting Ricky Reed, Christian Rich, Dubbel Dutch, and Jesse Shatkin for the album's production. The result was a departure from Lizzo's previous hip-hop releases. Lyrically, the extended play explores themes of body positivity, self-love, and the journey to those ideals.

Upon its release, Coconut Oil received positive reviews from music critics. Commercially, Coconut Oil initially peaked at number 44 on the Billboard Top R&B/Hip-Hop Albums chart, making it Lizzo's first release to chart. However, two years after it was first released, the popularity of the single "Good as Hell" renewed interest in the EP and it subsequently reached a new peak of number 31 on the Billboard Top 200 Albums chart. It would later be certified Gold in New Zealand.

To promote the extended play, Lizzo embarked on the Good as Hell Tour in 2017. "Good as Hell" was released as the EP's first single, as part of the soundtrack for the 2016 film Barbershop: The Next Cut, and became a sleeper hit, peaking at number three on the US Billboard Hot 100 in 2019. "Phone" was released shortly after the announcement of the extended play as the second single. Lizzo's song "Worship" was featured in the first episode of Step Up: High Water.

== Background ==
Coconut Oil is Lizzo's first release with a major record label, and was originally intended as a full-length release. The EP serves as the follow-up to the singer's second studio album, Big Grrrl Small World (2015). Lizzo described the reason for the name Coconut Oil, stating:

There's self-exploration. There's self-love. Then there's self-realization," she notes of her past music. "'Coconut Oil' is the ultimate ode to self-care and to my process. I'm not there yet, but I'm creating my music so I can get there.

— Lizzo, Rolling Stone

== Composition ==
The EP discusses themes of body positivity, self-love, and the trials one faces to achieve those ideals. The opening track, "Worship", contains mambo-inspired horns and a showtune-like chorus, creating two very different syncopated dance rhythms. “Phone” has been described as "pure MPC and bassline magic" that lyrically discusses the loss of one's phone and friends at a club. Lizzo freestyled each lyric to the song. “Scuse Me” contains "twinkly" opening keys before breaking into long bass drops and frantic drum sequences. The song lyrically talks about self-love, and has been compared to "Oops, Oh My" by Tweet.

"Deep" is a club-ready dance tune with soukous-inflected guitar riffs. "Good as Hell" is a "brassy" self-empowerment anthem, where the protagonist is giving more than they get in a relationship. The closing titular track is a sparse R&B song that sees the singer crooning “I thought I needed to run and find somebody to love, but all I needed was some coconut oil” against a backdrop of organs. Lyrically, it discusses the singer's journey to confidence, and was dedicated to the black women who have connected with her music. The singer plays the flute in the song, a guitar solo from producer Ricky Reed, and features excerpts of the singer's family church telling stories.

== Singles and promotion ==
=== "Good as Hell" ===
"Good as Hell" was released as the lead single from the EP on May 11, 2016, as part of the soundtrack for the 2016 film Barbershop: The Next Cut. It premiered as an exclusive on Zane Lowe's Beats 1 show. In 2019, the song would become a sleeper hit, and would go on to peak at number 3 on the Billboard Hot 100. It additionally topped four Billboard charts and the UK Hip Hop/R&B Singles Chart, and also peaked within the top 10 of charts in Australia, Belgium, Canada, Lebanon, New Zealand and Scotland, alongside the Euro Digital Song Sales. It would later be certified 5× Platinum by the Recording Industry Association of America (RIAA), and was also certified Platinum or higher in Australia, Austria, Canada, New Zealand, and the United Kingdom. Its music video was released on the 11th of May, 2016, and currently has over 156,000,000 views as of 2025.

The song would later be re-released on her third studio album, Cuz I Love You (2019), with a remix featuring Ariana Grande appearing on the Super Deluxe edition of the album. The remix was certified Platinum in Brazil, France, and New Zealand. That same year, she performed the song in a medley with "Truth Hurts" at the 2019 MTV Video Music Awards. She also performed the song on an episode of Saturday Night Live. In 2020, the song was nominated for four awards, winning in the Award-Winning Songs category at the BMI R&B/Hip-Hop Awards. The Ariana Grande remix was also nominated in the Best Remix category at the 2020 iHeartRadio Music Awards.

=== Other songs ===
"Phone" was released as the second single from the EP on September 19, 2016. That same day, a music video was released for the track. The video currently has over 6,000,000 views as of 2025. It would notably be lip-synced on an episode of RuPaul's Drag Race All Stars alongside Lizzo herself. Despite not being released as a single, the song "Scuse Me" also received a music video, which currently has over 14,000,000 views as of 2025.

== Critical reception ==
Professional ratings
Review scores
Source	Rating
Pitchfork	6.1/10

Vanessa Okoth-Obbo, writing for Pitchfork, rated the EP 6.1 out of 10, writing that "Coconut Oil works best when considered as a statement of intent – an inventory of all the things she’s good at, and a testing ground for how best to blend them in the future." Syra Aburto, writing for Nylon, wrote that the "like the product it's named after, [Lizzo's] latest project, Coconut Oil, is essential for healthy living." Rolling Stone placed it at number 14 on its list of the "20 Best Pop Albums of 2016".

== Commercial performance ==
Upon the renewed interest of "Good as Hell", Coconut Oil charted at number 31 on the US Billboard 200, It also charted at number 30 on the Top R&B/Hip-Hop Albums chart and peaked at number 6 on the Indie Store Albums Sales chart. In Canada, the EP charted at number 50 on the Canadian Albums chart. In New Zealand, despite not charting, the EP was certified Gold by Recorded Music New Zealand (RMNZ) for equivalent sales of 7,500 units in the country.

== Track listing ==
No.	Title	Writer(s)	Producer(s)	Length
1.	"Worship"	Melissa "Lizzo" Jefferson; Eric Frederic; Joseph Spargur; Jose Fernandez	Ricky Reed	2:57
2.	"Phone"	Jefferson; Evan Kidd Bogart; Jesse Shatkin	Reed; Shatkin	2:49
3.	"Scuse Me"	Jefferson; Frederic; Marc Glasser; Blaise Railey	Reed; Dubbel Dutch	3:24
4.	"Deep"	Jefferson; Jean Baptiste Kouame; Kehinde Hassan; Taiwo Hassan	Christian Rich; Reed	3:14
5.	"Good as Hell"	Jefferson; Frederic	Reed	2:39
6.	"Coconut Oil"	Jefferson; Frederic; Aaron Jennings	Reed	4:25
Total length:				19:28

== Personnel ==
Credits adapted from album's liner notes.

- Jason Andrews – engineer (track 4)
- Elder Orlandus Dunning – additional vocals (6)
- Dubbel Dutch – co-producer (track 3)
- Chris Galland – mix engineer (track 3), mixing assistant (5)
- Chris Gehringer – mastering (all tracks)
- Lil Aaron – additional vocals (track 6)
- Lizzo – vocals (all tracks), flute (6)
- Manny Marroquin – mixing (tracks 3, 5)
- Ricky Reed – producer (all tracks), instruments and programming (1, 3, 5, 6), mixing (1), keyboards (2), additional guitar (4), executive producer
- Christian Rich – producers, instruments, and programming (track 4)
- Ike Schultz – mixing (tracks 2, 4, 6), mixing assistant (5)
- Jesse Shatkin – producer, programming, drums, bass, keyboards, and engineer (track 2)
- Ethan Shumaker – engineer (tracks 1, 3–6)

== Charts ==
=== Weekly charts ===
2016 weekly chart performance for Coconut Oil
Chart	Peak position
US Top R&B/Hip-Hop Albums (Billboard)	44

2019 weekly chart performance for Coconut Oil
Chart	Peak position
Canadian Albums (Billboard)	30
US Billboard 200	31
US Top R&B/Hip-Hop Albums (Billboard)	21
US Indie Store Album Sales (Billboard)	6
UK Record Store Chart (Official Charts)	33

=== Year-end charts ===
Year-end chart performance for Coconut Oil
Chart (2019)	Position
US Top R&B/Hip-Hop Albums (Billboard)	97

== Certifications ==
Certifications and sales for Coconut Oil
Region	Certification	Certified units/sales
New Zealand (RMNZ)	Gold	7,500^{‡}
^{‡} Sales+streaming figures based on certification alone.
