= Like a Girl =

Like a Girl may refer to:

- Like a Girl (commercial), often shown as #LikeAGirl, a commercial for Always feminine hygiene products
- "Like a Girl", a song by Lizzo on the album Cuz I Love You
