= Rumors (Lizzo song) =

2021 single by Lizzo featuring Cardi B

Single by Lizzo featuring Cardi B
- Written: 2020-2021
- Released: August 13, 2021
- Recorded: 2021
- Genre: Hip hop; funk
- Length: 2:52
- Label: Atlantic; Nice Life
- Songwriters: Melissa Jefferson; Belcalis Almanzar; Torae Carr; Nate Mercereau; Steven Cheung; Eric Frederic; Theron Thomas
- Producer: Ricky Reed

Lizzo singles chronology
"Cuz I Love You" (2020)	"Rumors" (2021)	"About Damn Time" (2022)

Cardi B singles chronology
"Wild Side" (2021)	"Rumors" (2021)	"Shake It" (2022)

Music video
- "Rumors" on YouTube

"Rumors" is a song by American singer and rapper Lizzo, featuring fellow American rapper Cardi B. The song was released on August 13, 2021, through Nice Life Recording and Atlantic Records, alongside a music video. The single marked Lizzo's first release in over two years, following her 2019 album Cuz I Love You. The song was written by the two artists alongside Nate Mercereau, Steven Cheung, Theron Thomas, Torae Carr, and its producer Ricky Reed.

== Background and release ==
In October 2020, American singer and rapper Lizzo announced that her fourth studio album was nearing completion, saying she had "a few more songs to write". On January 18, 2021, American singer SZA confirmed she had heard new material by the singer. She explained that Lizzo played her "the best song I ever heard in my life" and that it made her cry. On August 1, Lizzo told fans that she had an exciting post to share the next day. On August 2, announced on social media that "Rumors" would be released on August 13. The single was made available for pre-order in different formats. The release of the song marked Lizzo's first release in over two years, since the release of her third studio album, Cuz I Love You, on April 9, 2019.

An accompanying music video for "Rumors" was released alongside the song on August 13, 2021.

== Composition ==
"Rumors" was written by Lizzo, Cardi B, Torae Carr, Theron Thomas, Nate Mercereau, Steven Cheung, and its producer Ricky Reed. Musically, the song is set in the key of B minor, with a tempo of 118 beats per minute. The vocals in the song span from F♯_{3} to D_{5}.

The song features Lizzo "talking her shit over a simple piano melody. It quickly warps into anonymous, stomping future funk, complete with rubbery synth, handclaps, and electric guitar." Lyrically, it "sees Lizzo confront the 'shit on the internet' that's clung to her since she conquered the mainstream in 2019."

== Critical reception ==
Rating it with five stars out of five, Nick Levine of NME stated that "Rumors" is a "brilliant return from Lizzo that combines her signature sense of fun with some well-placed spikiness." Dubbing it "half a twerk jam and half a radio jingle" that "will be a big hit", Vulture's Craig Jenkins opined that "the journey from the rote, familiar drums and bass underneath the verses to the trippy harmonies and boisterous big-band arrangements around the chorus is too slow of a build." Comparing it to "Truth Hurts", Eric Torres of Pitchfork wrote that the single "feels slapped together from different parts of Lizzo's past hits: the bellowing horns, squealing guitar solos, and endless confidence are all here."

=== Accolades ===
Critical rankings for "Rumors"
Publication	Critics' lists	Rank	Ref.
Billboard	The Best Songs of 2021	38	
The New York Times (Jon Pareles)	Best Songs of 2021	5	

== Awards and nominations ==
Awards and nominations for "Rumors"
Year	Organization	Award	Result	Ref(s)
2021	MTV Video Music Awards	Song of Summer	Nominated	
2022	Kids' Choice Awards	Favorite Collaboration	Nominated	

== Commercial performance ==
"Rumors" debuted at number four on the US Billboard Hot 100, becoming Lizzo's third and Cardi B's tenth top 10 single on the chart. Lizzo also achieved her third number one and Cardi B her seventh on the Hot R&B/Hip-Hop Songs chart. It debuted at number three on the Rolling Stone Top 100 moving 136,000 units, including 15 million US streams. It also became Lizzo's first entry on Billboard Global 200 and Global Excl. US, debuting at numbers 12 and 29, respectively.

== Music video ==
The video for "Rumors", directed by Tanu Muino, references the Muses from Disney's Hercules in a set inspired by ancient Greece. The closing pose echoes the neoclassical painting Oath of the Horatii by Jacques-Louis David. During the video Lizzo and Cardi wear golden attires, togas, and Ionic column-inspired headdress, as artwork gets animated.

== Credits and personnel ==
Credits adapted from Tidal.

- Lizzo – vocals, songwriting
- Cardi B – featured vocals, songwriting
- Ricky Reed – songwriting, production, programming, horn arrangement, bass synthesizer, keyboards
- Nate Mercereau – songwriting, co-production, guitar, keyboards
- Tele – songwriting, co-production, programming, guitar, keyboards
- Theron Thomas – songwriting
- Torae Carr – songwriting
- Donald Hayes – alto vocals, tenor vocals, baritone saxophone
- Lemar Guillary – horn arrangement, trombone, bass trombone
- Thomas Pridgen – drums
- Mike Cordone – flugelhorn, trumpet
- Victor Indrizzo – percussion
- Emerson Mancini – mastering
- Manny Marroquin – mixing
- Leslie Brathwaite – vocal mixing
- Bill Malina – engineering
- Evan LaRay – engineering
- Patrick Kehrier – assistant engineering

== Charts ==
=== Weekly charts ===
Weekly chart performance for "Rumors"
Chart (2021)	Peak position
Australia (ARIA)	16
Belgium (Ultratop 50 Flanders)	41
Canada Hot 100 (Billboard)	12
Canada CHR/Top 40 (Billboard)	21
Global 200 (Billboard)	12
Ireland (IRMA)	16
Japan Hot Overseas (Billboard Japan)	12
Lithuania (AGATA)	40
Netherlands (Single Tip)	6
New Zealand (Recorded Music NZ)	23
Portugal (AFP)	72
Romania (Airplay 100)	77
San Marino (SMRRTV Top 50)	16
South Africa (RISA)	38
Sweden (Sverigetopplistan)	60
Switzerland (Schweizer Hitparade)	85
UK Singles (Official Charts)	20
US Billboard Hot 100	4
US Hot R&B/Hip-Hop Songs (Billboard)	1
US Pop Airplay (Billboard)	15
US Rhythmic Airplay (Billboard)	13

=== Year-end charts ===
Year-end chart performance for "Rumors"
Chart (2021)	Position
US Hot R&B/Hip-Hop Songs (Billboard)	72

== Certifications ==
Certifications for "Rumors"
Region	Certification	Certified units/sales
Australia (ARIA)	Gold	35,000^{‡}
Canada (Music Canada)	Platinum	80,000^{‡}
New Zealand (RMNZ)	Gold	15,000^{‡}
United Kingdom (BPI)	Silver	200,000^{‡}
United States (RIAA)	Platinum	1,000,000^{‡}
^{‡} Sales+streaming figures based on certification alone.

== Release history ==
Release dates and formats for "Rumors"
Region	Date	Format(s)	Label	Ref.
Various	August 13, 2021	Cassette; CD; digital download; flexi disc; streaming	Nice Life; Atlantic	
Italy	August 13, 2021	Radio airplay	Warner	
United States	August 17, 2021	Contemporary hit radio	Atlantic	
United States	August 17, 2021	Rhythmic contemporary radio	Atlantic	
