= Tempo (Lizzo song) =

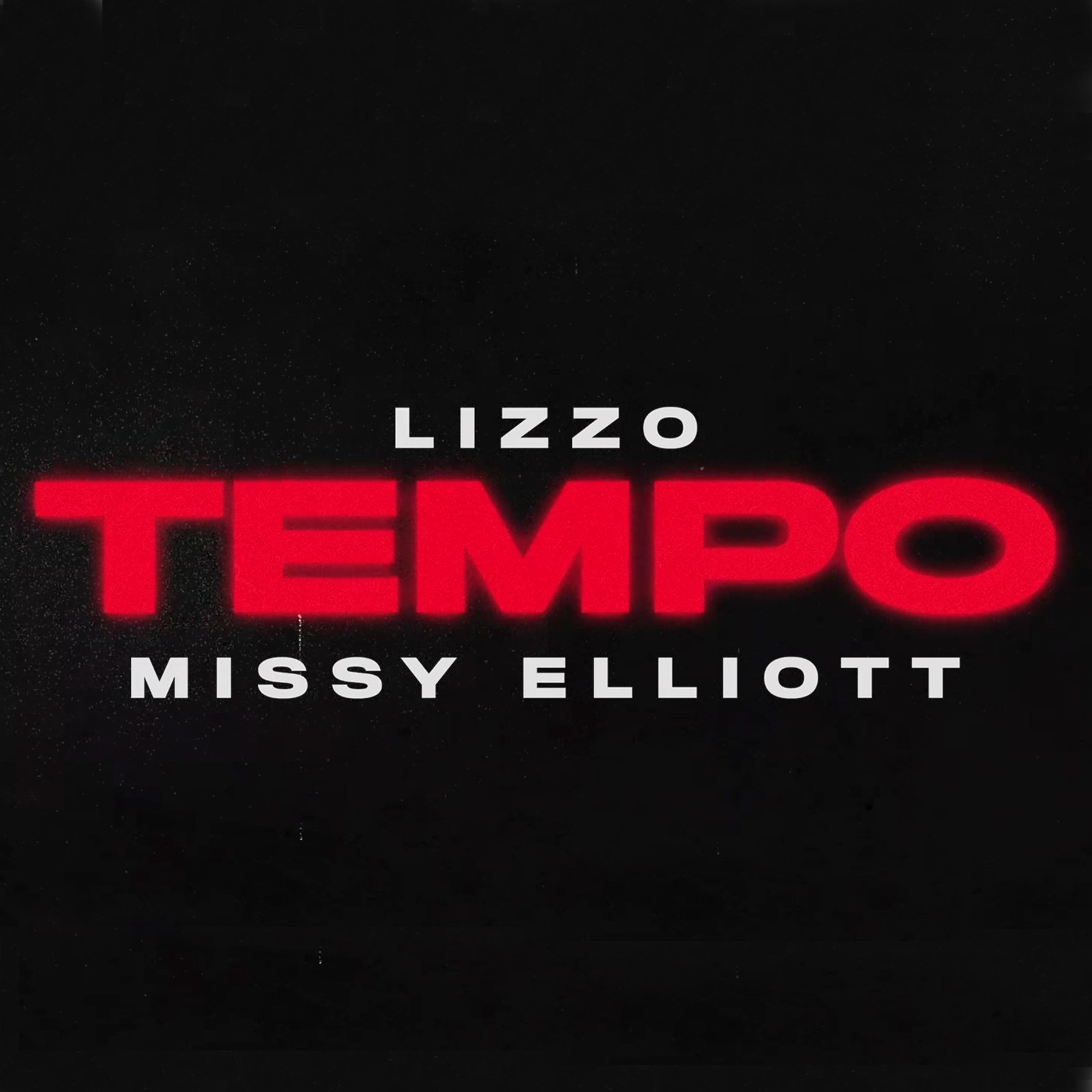

Promotional single by Lizzo featuring Missy Elliott

from the album Cuz I Love You
- B-side: "Juice"; "Cuz I Love You"
- Released: July 26, 2019
- Genre: R&B; trap; pop-funk
- Length: 2:55
- Label: Nice Life; Atlantic
- Songwriters: Melissa Jefferson; Melissa Elliott; Theron Thomas; Raymond Scott; Dan Farber; Eric Frederic; Antonio Cuna; Tobias Wincorn
- Producers: Lizzo; Ricky Reed; Sweater Beats; Dan Farber; Nate Mercureau; Tobias Wincorn

Music video
- "Tempo" on YouTube

"Tempo" is a song by American singer and rapper Lizzo featuring American rapper Missy Elliott for her third studio album and major-label debut Cuz I Love You (2019). The song was released as a promotional single on March 20, 2019, and its music video was released on July 26, 2019.

The single was written by the two artists with contributions from Antonio Cuna (a.k.a. Sweater Beats), Tobias Wincorn, Theron Thomas, Dan Farber, and Eric Frederic (a.k.a. Ricky Reed). The recording uses a sample from an electronic recording/composition entitled "Nescafé" by Raymond Scott (from his album Manhattan Research, Inc.), who is credited as a co-writer. Lizzo and Reed co-produced the track with Farber, Wincorn, Sweater Beats, and Nate Mercereau. Musically, "Tempo" is an R&B and trap song composed of a bass-heavy, woodwind-inspired beat. It contains lyrics about body positivity, and has been described by one music critic as an "ode to curvaceous women".

"Tempo" received positive reviews from music critics, who praised the artists' performances and deemed it a club track. Commercially, it entered several component charts in Belgium and the United States. The song was promoted by an accompanying music video, directed by Andy Hines. It was released on July 26, 2019.

== Composition ==
"Tempo" is a "nostalgia-filled" R&B, trap, and funk-pop song with a length of two minutes and fifty five seconds. The song begins with a powerful guitar riff, before breaking into the song's chorus: "Slow songs, they for skinny hoes. Can't move all of this here to one of those". It contains a "bass-heavy" and woodwind-inspired beat, before closing with a flute solo. Elliott's verse was added to the track after Lizzo had heard the song's completed instrumental. Described as "fiery twerk-team anthem" by NPR, "Tempo" is an "ode to curvaceous women" containing "self-assured" and "feel good" lyrics, followed by Elliott's "curve-celebrating" verse in the bridge.

== Critical reception ==
"Tempo" received positive reviews from music critics. Will Lavin, writing for NME, called the track "fierce" and "up-tempo". Brendan Wetmore of Paper praised the song as "the kind of track that you don't even have to try to dance to". He also labelled it "a song for the club". Joshua Bote, writing for NPR, reacted positively to the song, calling it "a track that flows freely with their combined confidence and mic skills". Mike Wass of Idolator called the song "an unrepentant banger". Ben Kaye, writing for Consequence of Sound, praised Elliott's verse, writing "the slapping '90s beat is perfect for Missy [Elliott]".

=== Accolades ===
| Year | Ceremony | Category | Result | Ref. |
|---|---|---|---|---|
| 2019 | BET Hip Hop Awards | Impact Track | Nominated | |
| 2019 | MTV Video Music Awards | Best Power Anthem | Nominated | |

== Music video ==
Lizzo announced the song's music video on July 25, 2019. The video, directed by Andy Hines, was released on July 26, 2019. It features Lizzo, dressed in a blue coat and red cowboy hat, partying in a diner parking lot with several dancers and cars in the background. Missy Elliott jumps out of a car in a tracksuit to perform her verse. David Renshaw of The Fader called the video "joy-filled".

== Track listing ==
Tempo
| No. | Title | Length |
|---|---|---|
| 1. | "Tempo" (featuring Missy Elliott) | 2:55 |
| 2. | "Juice" | 3:15 |
| 3. | "Cuz I Love You" | 2:59 |
| Total length: | | 9:09 |

== Personnel ==
Adapted from Tidal.

- Lizzo – lead artist, songwriter, producer, programmer
- Missy Elliott – featured artist, songwriter, additional vocals
- Ricky Reed – songwriter, producer, instruments, programmer
- Shelbeniece Swain – additional vocals
- Theron Thomas – songwriter, additional vocals
- Dan Farber – songwriter, co-producer, programmer
- Nate Mercereau – co-producer, programmer
- Sweater Beats – co-producer, programmer
- Antonio Cuna – songwriter
- Raymond Scott – songwriter, recorded sample
- Tobias Wincorn – songwriter, co-producer, programmer
- Ethan Shumaker – additional vocals, engineer
- Chris Gehringer – masterer
- Manny Marroquin – mixer
- Robin Florent – mixer
- Scott Desmarais – mixer

== Charts ==
| Chart (2019) | Peak position |
|---|---|
| Belgium (Ultratip Bubbling Under Wallonia) | 38 |
| Belgium Urban (Ultratop Flanders) | 29 |
| Belgium Urban (Ultratop Wallonia) | 30 |
| US Bubbling Under Hot 100 (Billboard) | 8 |
| US Dance Club Songs (Billboard) | 53 |
| US Digital Songs (Billboard) | 21 |
| US Hot R&B/Hip-Hop Songs (Billboard) | 48 |

=== Year-end charts ===
| Chart (2019) | Position |
|---|---|
| US R&B/Hip-Hop Digital Song Sales (Billboard) | 44 |

== Certifications ==
| Region | Certification | Certified units/sales |
|---|---|---|
| Canada (Music Canada) | Gold | 40,000^{‡} |
| New Zealand (RMNZ) | Gold | 15,000^{‡} |
| United States (RIAA) | Platinum | 1,000,000^{‡} |
^{‡} Sales+streaming figures based on certification alone.

== Release history ==
| Region | Date | Format | Label | Ref. |
|---|---|---|---|---|
| Various | March 20, 2019 (Note: Release as a promotional single.) | Digital download; streaming | Atlantic; Nice Life | |
| Various | July 26, 2019 | Digital download; streaming | Atlantic; Nice Life | |
