= Virgin Fest 2020 =

Music festival

Virgin Fest is a multi-genre Los Angeles-based music festival that exhibits global and local talent. Founded in 2018 by Jason Felts and Sir Richard Branson, Virgin Fest was set to have its first event in Los Angeles on June 6 and 7, 2020. The event was postponed in May due to the COVID-19 pandemic.

== History ==
Virgin Fest offers a platform for the renowned music and entertainment enthusiasts. The dates in June were also chosen to commemorate the 50th anniversary of the Virgin brand.

== Virgin Fest ==
Virgin Fest was set to do its inaugural festival in June 2020 in Los Angeles California with Grammy winning stars as the headliners. The Los Angeles event was scheduled to take place on June 6 and 7, 2020. It was set to feature a lineup of 60% female artists. Some prominent names in the line-up includes Ellie Goulding, Tank, Jorja Smith, Kali Uchis, Clairo, Japanese Breakfast and the Bangas. The indoor California Stadium was chosen as the venue with a capacity of 22,000 with an outdoor space of 160-acre Exposition Park. However, the event was called off by Gavin Newsom, the governor of California, due to the COVID-19 situation.

Jason Felts, the co-founder of Virgin Fest, expected festivals of Virgin Fest to be clean and high-end. Virgin Fest's co-founder Branson believes that innovation and ingenuity combined with hospitality are the pillars on which the brand was launched.

== Environmental-Conscious Initiatives ==
A major part of Virgin Fest includes environmental initiatives. Virgin Fest considers the environment as a priority with no single use plastic, zero paper tickets use, and working towards zero fossil fuels. The festival aimed to reduce carbon footprint and tackle the climate crisis through sustainable inclusion. The location of the 2020 festival in Los Angeles was chosen due to its proximity to multiple Metro stations as it encourages the audience to use public transportation.

== Festivals and line-ups ==
1. Lizzo
2. A$AP Rocky
3. Major Lazer
4. Ellie Goulding
5. Kali Uchis
6. Jorja Smith
7. Clairo
8. Japanese Breakfast
9. Lay Zhang
