= Cuz I Love You =

Studio album by Lizzo
- Released: April 19, 2019
- Recorded: August 2016 – July 2018
- Genres: Pop; hip-hop; R&B
- Length: 33:18
- Labels: Nice Life; Atlantic
- Producers: Sweater Beats; Dan Farber; Lizzo; Nate Mercereau; Oak; Ricky Reed; Mike Sabath; Trevorious; Tobias Wincorn; X Ambassadors

Lizzo chronology
Coconut Oil (2016)	Cuz I Love You (2019)	Special (2022)

Singles from Cuz I Love You
- 1. "Juice" Released: January 4, 2019; 2. "Cuz I Love You" Released: January 28, 2020

Cuz I Love You is the third studio album by American singer and rapper Lizzo. It was released through Nice Life Recording Company and Atlantic Records on April 19, 2019, serving as her major-label debut. The album features guest appearances from American rappers Missy Elliott and Gucci Mane. It spawned the single "Juice" and the promotional single "Tempo", the latter of which is a collaboration with Elliott. The deluxe edition of the album was released on May 3 and includes the Billboard Hot 100 number one single "Truth Hurts". The deluxe edition was nominated for Album of the Year at the 62nd Annual Grammy Awards, and won Best Urban Contemporary Album.

== Background ==
The album is Lizzo's first release since her 2016 Coconut Oil EP. Lizzo stated at the album preview party at the Crazy Girls strip club in Hollywood on January 30 that she had been working on the album for three years. She also previewed a collaboration with Missy Elliott titled "Tempo" that appeared on the album. Along with the lead single "Juice", the album includes the "empowering dance track" "Like a Girl" and a song dedicated to an ex titled "Jerome".

== Promotion ==
Lizzo announced the album in January 2019, and on February 13, shared the album's cover art, on which she appears nude. Paper called the cover a "stunning glow-up, and a transformation for Lizzo", going on to say that "Fat, and especially fat and Black bodies are rarely treated with such care by photographers, let alone on album covers that will sit on Target and Walmart shelves."

The album was supported by two concert tours: Cuz I Love You Tour (2019) and Cuz I Love You Too Tour (2019–2020).

=== Singles ===
"Juice" was released as the lead single from the record on January 4, 2019. The single became Lizzo's first commercial hit, entering component R&B charts in the United States, while also reaching the top twenty in Scotland. The single was promoted with Lizzo's debut television performance on The Ellen DeGeneres Show, and a later performance on The Tonight Show Starring Jimmy Fallon.

"Cuz I Love You", originally released as a promotional single on February 14, 2019, the song also was given a music video that premiered on YouTube the same date. Later, the song was released as a single to contemporary hit radio on January 28, 2020.

=== Promotional singles ===
The album's title track was released as the first promotional single on February 14, 2019, alongside the song's music video. "Tempo" featuring Elliott was released as the album's second promotional single on March 20, 2019. "Tempo" went on to chart at number 21 on the US Digital Song Sales chart, Lizzo's first entry on a Billboard Hot 100 component chart. The song was further promoted with a music video that premiered via YouTube on July 26, 2019.

== Critical reception ==
Professional ratings
Aggregate scores
Source	Rating
AnyDecentMusic?	7.9/10
Metacritic	84/100
Review scores
Source	Rating
AllMusic	5/5 stars
The A.V. Club	B
The Daily Telegraph	5/5 stars
The Guardian	3/5 stars
The Independent	4/5 stars
NME	5/5 stars
The Observer	4/5 stars
Pitchfork	6.5/10
Rolling Stone	4/5 stars
Vice (Expert Witness)	A−

Cuz I Love You received widespread acclaim from music critics upon its initial release. At Metacritic, which assigns a normalized rating out of 100 to reviews from mainstream critics, the album has an average score of 84, based on 24 reviews, indicating "universal acclaim".

Reviewing the album for AllMusic, Heather Phares praised Cuz I Love You as "a triumphant showcase for every part of Lizzo's talent, physicality and sexuality." Jumi Akinfenwa of Clash stated that by "Offering up a mix of pop, hip-hop, R&B and a sprinkling of trap and neo soul for good measure, Lizzo covers all bases and serves the perfect introduction to her world for mainstream audiences." DIY magazine's Rachel Finn gave a positive evaluation of the album, writing that "Lizzo's vibrant personality and humour shining through a set of tracks that switches through elements of funk, pop and R&B with ease."

In an article for NME, reviewer Natty Kasambala described the album as being "as flawlessly genre-spanning as Lizzo herself: pop at its core, but with constant references to her jazz roots and historical love of twerking." Claire Biddles at The Line of Best Fit shared similar sentiments, calling the album "Charming, addictive and seemingly effortless, Cuz I Love You is Lizzo's declaration of superstardom." Slant Magazine's Zachary Hoskins concluded that "Lizzo's talent has always been evident, but this album's material, her strongest to date, allows her put it on full display. By the languorous, seductive neo-soul of closing track "Lingerie", her enthusiasm is as contagious as it is well-earned."

Some reviewers were more reserved in their assessments of the album. In a review for The Guardian, Alexis Petridis felt that "Lizzo has something to say, and a smart way of saying it ... but the potency of what's here would seem more potent still if it had been allowed a little room to breathe ... Instead, Cuz I Love You keeps its foot pressed down hard on the accelerator for half an hour in an attempt to ram-raid the charts." Rawiya Kameir was also critical in the review for Pitchfork, claiming that "Despite her obvious skill and charisma, some of the album's 11 songs are burdened with overwrought production, awkward turns of phrase, and ham-handed rapping."

=== Accolades ===
Year-end lists
Publication	Accolade	Rank	Ref.
Billboard	The 50 Best Albums of 2019	4	
Billboard	The 100 Greatest Albums of the 2010s	65	
Consequence of Sound	Top 50 Albums of 2019	7	
Entertainment Weekly	Top Best Albums of 2019	3	
GQ	The albums that made 2019 great again	6	
GQ (Russia)	The 20 Best Albums of 2019	—N/a	
The Guardian	The 50 Best Albums of 2019	28	
NME	The 50 Best Albums of 2019	16	
Paste	The 34 Best Albums of 2019	9	
PopCrush	25 Best Pop Albums of 2019	—N/a	
Rolling Stone	The 50 Best Albums of 2019	6	
Rolling Stone	The 200 Best Albums of the 2010s	69	
Uproxx	The Best Albums of 2019	8	

== Awards and nominations ==
Awards and nominations for Cuz I Love You
Award	Year (Note: Indicates the year of ceremony. Each year is linked to the article about the awards held that year, wherever possible.)	Category	Result	Ref.
BET Hip Hop Awards	2019	Album of the Year	Nominated	
Grammy Awards	2020	Album of the Year	Nominated	
Grammy Awards	2020	Best Urban Contemporary Album	Won	
People's Choice Awards	2019	Album of 2019	Nominated	
Soul Train Music Awards	2019	Album/Mixtape of the Year	Won	
BET Awards	2020	Album of the Year	Nominated	

== Commercial performance ==
Cuz I Love You debuted at number six on the Billboard 200 with 41,000 album-equivalent units, of which 24,000 were pure album sales. It was Lizzo's first album to chart on the Billboard 200. It then repeaked at number six on the charting week ending on June 27, 2019. It has stayed in the top 10 for 15 weeks after its release. The album peaked number 4 in its 19th week on the chart dated September 7, 2019.

== Track listing ==
Songwriting credits adapted from BMI.

Cuz I Love You
No.	Title	Writer(s)	Producer(s)	Length
1.	"Cuz I Love You"	Melissa Jefferson; Sam Harris; Casey Harris; Adam Levin; Russ Flynn	X Ambassadors	3:00
2.	"Like a Girl"	Jefferson; Warren "Oak" Felder; Sean Douglas	Oak	3:05
3.	"Juice"	Jefferson; Eric Frederic; Theron Thomas; Sam Sumser; Sean Small	Ricky Reed; Nate Mercereau^{[b]}	3:15
4.	"Soulmate"	Jefferson; Felder; Douglas	Oak	2:55
5.	"Jerome"	Jefferson; S. Harris; C. Harris; Levin	X Ambassadors	3:52
6.	"Crybaby"	Jefferson; Frederic; Thomas; Mercereau	Reed; Mercereau	2:56
7.	"Tempo" (featuring Missy Elliott)	Jefferson; Dan Farber; Frederic; Tobias Wincorn; Thomas; Raymond Scott; Antonio Cuna; Melissa Elliott	Ricky Reed; Sweater Beats; Tobias Wincorn; Farber; Lizzo; Mercereau^{[a]}	2:55
8.	"Exactly How I Feel" (featuring Gucci Mane)	Jefferson; Thomas; Mike Sabath; Radric Davis	Sabath	2:23
9.	"Better in Color"	Jefferson; Felder; Michael Pollack; Trevor "Downtown" Brown; William Zaire; Simmons	Oak; Downtown Trevor Brown^{[a]}; Zaire Koalo^{[a]}	2:13
10.	"Heaven Help Me"	Jefferson; C. Harris; S. Harris; Levin	X Ambassadors	3:22
11.	"Lingerie"	Jefferson; Frederic; Mercereau; Thomas	Ricky Reed; Mercereau	3:22
Total length:				33:18

Cuz I Love You – Deluxe version
No.	Title	Writer(s)	Producer(s)	Length
12.	"Boys"	Lil Aaron; Mercereau; Frederic; Jefferson	Mercereau; Reed	2:53
13.	"Truth Hurts"	Jefferson; Frederic; Amina Patrice Bogle-Barriteau; Jesse Saint John; Steven Cheung	Reed; Tele^{[a]}	2:53
14.	"Water Me"	Jefferson; Frederic; Clarence Coffee Jr.; E. Kidd Bogart; Farhad Samadzada; Morris Wittenberg; Nneka Lucia Egbuna; Wincorn	Reed; Wincorn^{[b]}	3:06
Total length:				42:10

Japanese bonus tracks
No.	Title	Writer(s)	Producer(s)	Length
15.	"Juice" (Breakbot remix)	Jefferson; Eric Frederic; Theron Thomas; Sam Sumser; Sean Small	Reed; Nate Mercereau^{[b]}	2:53
Total length:				45:04

Cuz I Love You – Super deluxe
No.	Title	Writer(s)	Producer(s)	Length
15.	"Good as Hell"	Jefferson; Frederic	Lizzo; Reed	2:39
16.	"Good as Hell" (remix featuring Ariana Grande)	Jefferson; Frederic; Ariana Grande	Lizzo; Reed	2:39
Total length:				47:18

Japanese bonus tracks – Super deluxe
No.	Title	Writer(s)	Producer(s)	Length
17.	"Truth Hurts" (DaBaby remix) (featuring DaBaby)	Jefferson; Frederic; Steven Cheung; Saint John; Steven Cheung; Jonathan Lyndale Kirk	Reed; Tele^{[a]}	3:17
18.	"Truth Hurts" (featuring AB6IX)	Jefferson; Frederic; Steven Cheung; Saint John; Steven Cheung	Reed; Tele^{[a]}	2:54
Total length:				53:47

Notes

- ^{^[a]} signifies a co-producer.
- ^{^[b]} signifies an additional producer.
- "Water Me" contains elements from "I Am Free, No Dope for Me" written by Morris Wittenberg and from "My Home" written by Nneka Lucia Egbuna and Farhad Samadzada.

== Personnel ==
Credits adapted from album's liner notes.

- Downtown Trevor Brown – co-producer (track 9)
- Harry Burr – mixing assistant (track 5)
- Clarence Coffee Jr. – additional vocals (track 14)
- Michael Cordone – trumpet (track 3)
- Scott Desmarais – mixing assistant (tracks 1–4, 6–11, 13)
- Missy Elliott – rap and additional vocals (track 7)
- Shaina Evoniuk – violin (track 11)
- Dan Farber – co-producer (track 7)
- Oak Felder – producer (tracks 2, 4, 9)
- Robin Florent – mixing assistant (tracks 1–4, 6–11, 13)
- Chris Galland – mix engineer (track 13)
- Chris Gehringer – mastering (tracks 1–4, 6–13)
- Gucci Mane – rap (track 8)
- Lemar Guillary – trombone (track 3)
- Victor Indrizzo – drums and percussion (track 3)
- Rouble Kapoor – assistant engineer (track 3)
- Zaire Koalo – co-producer (track 9)
- Joe LaPorta – mastering (track 5)
- Trevor Lawrence Jr. – drums (track 11)
- Lizzo – vocals (all tracks), producer (7), synthesizer (14), executive producer
- Bill Malina – engineer (tracks 3, 11)
- Manny Marroquin – mixing (tracks 1–4, 6–11, 13)
- Asha Maura – backing vocals (track 3)
- Andrew Maury – mixing (track 5)
- Jesse McGinty – saxophone (track 3)
- Nate Mercereau – producer (tracks 6, 11, 12), co-producer (7), additional production (3), engineer (6, 11), guitar and bass (3, 6, 11), keyboards (6, 11), instruments (7, 12), programming and drums (11)
- Sean Phelan – engineer (tracks 1, 5)
- Matthew Cerritos – assistant engineer (tracks 1, 5, 10)
- Ricky Reed – producer (tracks 3, 6, 7, 11–14), mixing (12), programming (3, 7, 11–14), keyboards and guitar (3), bass (3, 14), drums and synthesizer (14), instruments (7, 12)
- Mike Sabath – producer (track 8)
- Ethan Shumaker – engineer (tracks 3, 6, 7, 11–14), additional vocals (7)
- Keith "Daquan" Sorrells – assistant engineer (track 9)
- Shelby Swain – backing vocals (track 3), additional vocals (7)
- Sweater Beats – co-producer (track 7)
- Tele – co-producer and programming (track 13)
- Theron Thomas – backing vocals (track 3), additional vocals (7)
- Quinn Wilson – backing vocals (track 3)
- Tobias Wincorn – co-producer and programming (track 7), additional production (14)
- X Ambassadors – producers (tracks 1, 5, 10)

== Charts ==
=== Weekly charts ===
Weekly chart performance for Cuz I Love You
Chart (2019–2023)	Peak position
Australian Albums (ARIA)	19
Austrian Albums (Ö3 Austria)	66
Belgian Albums (Ultratop Flanders)	42
Belgian Albums (Ultratop Wallonia)	164
Canadian Albums (Billboard)	7
Dutch Albums (Album Top 100)	68
French Albums (SNEP)	111
Hungarian Albums (MAHASZ)	12
Irish Albums (Official Charts)	21
Lithuanian Albums (AGATA)	89
New Zealand Albums (RMNZ)	31
Scottish Albums (Official Charts)	46
Swiss Albums (Schweizer Hitparade)	75
UK Albums (Official Charts)	30
UK R&B Albums (Official Charts)	1
US Billboard 200	4
US Indie Store Album Sales (Billboard)	3

=== Year-end charts ===
Year-end chart performance for Cuz I Love You
Chart (2019)	Position
Canadian Albums (Billboard)	30
US Billboard 200	20
Chart (2020)	Position
Australian Albums (ARIA)	59
Belgian Albums (Ultratop Flanders)	152
Canadian Albums (Billboard)	33
US Billboard 200	41
Chart (2021)	Position
US Billboard 200	129

=== Decade-end charts ===
Decade-end chart performance for Cuz I Love You
Chart (2010–2019)	Position
US Billboard 200	109

== Certifications ==
Certifications for Cuz I Love You
Region	Certification	Certified units/sales
Brazil (Pro-Música Brasil)	Platinum	40,000^{‡}
Canada (Music Canada)	2× Platinum	160,000^{‡}
Denmark (IFPI Danmark)	Gold	10,000^{‡}
France (SNEP)	Gold	50,000^{‡}
Norway (IFPI Norway)	Gold	10,000^{‡}
Poland (ZPAV)	Gold	10,000^{‡}
United Kingdom (BPI)	Gold	100,000^{‡}
United States (RIAA)	Platinum	1,000,000^{‡}
^{‡} Sales+streaming figures based on certification alone.

== Release history ==
Release dates and formats for Cuz I Love You
Region	Date	Format	Version	Label	References
Various	April 19, 2019	CD; digital download; streaming	Original	Nice Life; Atlantic	
Various	May 3, 2019	Digital download; streaming	Deluxe	Nice Life; Atlantic	
Various	May 24, 2019	CD	Deluxe	Nice Life; Atlantic	
Japan	July 17, 2019	CD	Deluxe (Bonus Track)	Warner Music Japan	
Various	September 27, 2019	LP	Deluxe	Nice Life; Atlantic	
Japan	December 4, 2019	CD	Super Deluxe	Warner Music Japan	
Various	December 13, 2019	CD	Super Deluxe	Nice Life; Atlantic	
Various	January 24, 2020	Digital download; streaming	Super Deluxe	Nice Life; Atlantic	

== See also ==
- List of 2019 albums
- List of UK R&B Albums Chart number ones of 2019
