= Good as Hell =

2016 single by Lizzo

Single by Lizzo

from the EP Barbershop: The Next Cut and Coconut Oil
- Released: March 8, 2016 (original); September 17, 2019 (re-released)
- Studio: Elysian Park
- Genre: Soul-pop; R&B; pop rap
- Length: 2:39
- Label: Atlantic; Nice Life
- Songwriters: Melissa Jefferson; Eric Frederic
- Producer: Ricky Reed

Lizzo singles chronology
"Basement Queens" (2016)	"Good as Hell" (2016)	"Phone" (2016)

Music videos
- "Good as Hell" on YouTube; "Good as Hell" (2019 version) on YouTube

"Good as Hell" is a song recorded by American rapper and singer Lizzo. Written by Lizzo and producer Ricky Reed, it was released on March 8, 2016, by Atlantic Records and Nice Life Recording Company as the lead single from her first extended play, Coconut Oil, and subsequently was the namesake for her 2017 Good as Hell Tour. It was re-released in 2019 as a radio single, when it became a sleeper hit like her first hit, "Truth Hurts". The song was later included as a bonus track on the super deluxe edition of her third studio album, Cuz I Love You (2019), alongside its remix.

Following her performance of "Good as Hell" at the 2019 MTV Video Music Awards, it entered the US Billboard Hot 100, later reaching number three in November 2019 and the top ten in several other countries, including Australia, Canada, Belgium, New Zealand and the UK. Two music videos were released for the song; the first was set in a hair salon in 2016, and the second sees her playing in the marching band at Southern University for homecoming week in 2019. The single has received a 5× Platinum certification by the Recording Industry Association of America (RIAA).

== Release ==
"Good as Hell" was originally recorded for the soundtrack of the 2016 film Barbershop: The Next Cut. It first made its premiere on Zane Lowe's Beats 1 Radio show.

The song was released to digital retailers and streaming platforms on March 8, 2016. A four-track dance remix EP was released on June 17, 2016.

An official remix featuring American singer Ariana Grande was released on October 25, 2019.

== Music videos ==
The first music video was released on May 11, 2016. It shows Lizzo and several women of color going to a hair salon, having their hair and nails done while having fun with the occasion. The music video also ties into the movie Barbershop: The Next Cut.

On December 9, 2019, in the wake of the song's growing popularity, a new "official music video" was premiered on YouTube. This music video, directed by Alan Ferguson, is set in Southern University and features the Baton Rouge HBCU. In it, the university's marching band students have trouble with some regular classes in between preparation for an upcoming performance, with one of the university's marching band dancers looking heartbroken over a prior relationship she had with another student. Lizzo then shows up during one of the rehearsals and appears with the group throughout the video, performing her song and having fun with the group.

== Critical reception ==
In a review for NPR, Hanif Abdurraqib praised the song's inspirational and motivational qualities, saying "[the song is] the anthem of both the night itself and of life in preparation for it: the saint that comes to you in the mirror when the lighting is bad, or the hair won't move the way you want it to, or when you've tried on all of the outfits and none of them seem right." Abdurraqib also called it "the rare song that can play at any point in a night out and resonate in each."

In 2019, Billboard included "Good as Hell" on their list of the Top 10 Lizzo songs, saying "the song's message of self-love mixed with a melody that will worm its way inside your head make this track an absolute stunner."

== Chart performance ==
While "Good as Hell" never charted during Coconut Oil's release period, it began to gain traction in 2019 following Lizzo's continuing career trajectory and the chart climb of her 2017 hit "Truth Hurts". Following Lizzo's performance of the song at the 2019 MTV Video Music Awards, it entered the Billboard Hot 100 the following week at number 52, later peaking at number three, becoming Lizzo's second top 10 hit on the chart.

The club mixes of "Good as Hell" gave Lizzo her first number one at Dance Club Songs and her second chart topper at Dance/Mix Show Airplay in December 2019.

Following the release of the remix featuring Ariana Grande, "Good as Hell" reached new top 10 peaks in the United Kingdom, New Zealand, and Australia, becoming Lizzo's first top 10 single in each of these countries.

== Live performances ==
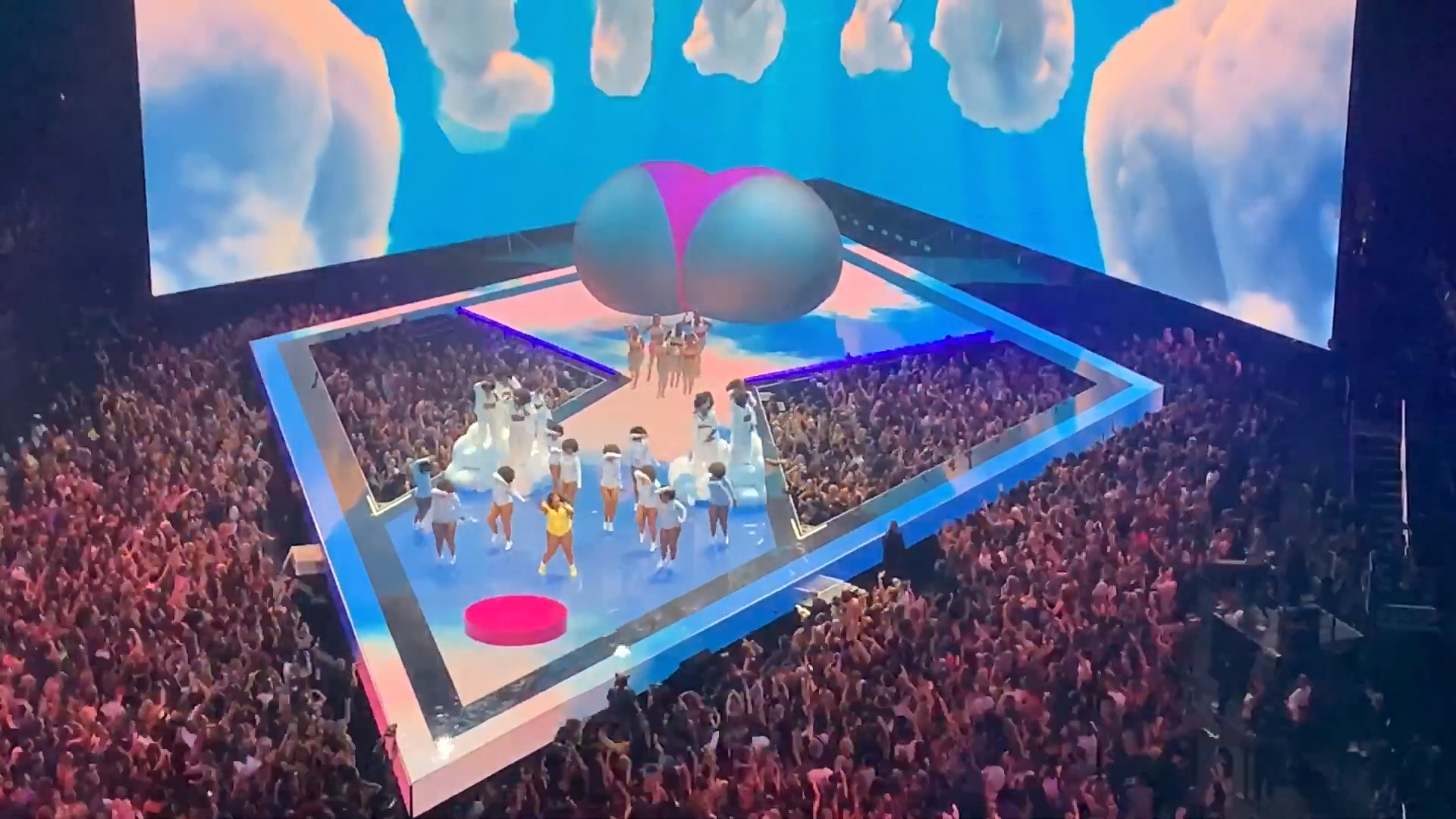
Lizzo performing at the 2019 MTV Video Music Awards

Lizzo performed a medley of "Truth Hurts" and "Good as Hell" at the 2019 MTV Video Music Awards. Wearing a neon yellow leotard, she transitioned into "Good As Hell" after opening with "Truth Hurts", with digital clouds in the background. During the performance, Lizzo took a shot of tequila and gave a self-acceptance speech. In Rolling Stone, Angie Martoccio opined that she "[took] the crowd to church" with a set that "[resembled] a hip-hop heaven". In NPR Music, Stephen Thompson opined that the performance "was a huge standout for the night—a win that'll do a lot more for her staying power than some statuette".

Lizzo performed "Good as Hell" as her second song on December 21, 2019, on Saturday Night Live. Accompanied by dancers, the Christmas-themed performance included trees, fake snow and candy-cane-painted stripper poles. She also performed a medley of "Cuz I Love You", "Truth Hurts", "Good as Hell" and "Juice" at the 2020 Brit Awards.

== In other media ==
"Good as Hell" was heard at the end of the films A Bad Moms Christmas, I Feel Pretty, and Blockers, as well as successive adverts for JD Williams, Garnier and My Little Pony: Pony Life. It was also used in Season 10 of the television show RuPaul's Drag Race in "lip sync for your life" between Kameron Michaels and Monét X Change. Lizzo herself was a guest judge in the episode.

== Awards and nominations ==
Year	Ceremony	Category	Result	Ref.
2020	MTV Video Music Awards	Best Editing	Nominated	
2020	Billboard Music Awards	Top R&B Song	Nominated	
2020	BMI R&B/Hip-Hop Awards	Award-Winning Songs	Won	
2020	Soul Train Music Awards	Video of the Year	Nominated	

== Track listing ==
Digital download

1. "Good as Hell" – 2:39

Spotify version

1. "Good as Hell" – 2:39
2. "Truth Hurts" – 2:53

Digital Remix EP

1. "Good as Hell" (Bad Royale Remix) – 3:33
2. "Good as Hell" (Nick Catchdubs Remix) – 3:56
3. "Good as Hell" (BNDR Remix) – 3:43
4. "Good as Hell" (Two Stacks Remix) – 2:57

== Charts ==
=== Weekly charts ===
Weekly chart performance for "Good as Hell"
Chart (2019–2020)	Peak position
Australia (ARIA)	6
Australia Urban (ARIA)	2
Austria (Ö3 Austria Top 40)	62
Belgium (Ultratop 50 Flanders)	7
Belgium (Ultratop 50 Wallonia)	10
Brazil (Top 100 Brasil)	81
Canada Hot 100 (Billboard)	10
Canada CHR/Top 40 (Billboard)	2
Czech Republic Airplay (ČNS IFPI)	11
Czech Republic Singles Digital (ČNS IFPI)	25
Denmark (Tracklisten)	36
Euro Digital Song Sales (Billboard)	5
France (SNEP)	59
Germany (GfK)	83
Hungary (Stream Top 40)	32
Ireland (IRMA)	22
Lebanon (Lebanese Top 20)	10
Lithuania (AGATA)	39
Mexico (Billboard Mexican Airplay)	32
New Zealand (Recorded Music NZ)	10
Norway (VG-lista)	18
Scottish Singles Sales (Official Charts)	2
Slovakia Airplay (ČNS IFPI)	15
Slovakia Singles Digital (ČNS IFPI)	23
Slovenia (SloTop50)	24
Switzerland (Schweizer Hitparade)	39
UK Singles (Official Charts)	7
UK Hip Hop/R&B (Official Charts)	1
US Billboard Hot 100	3
US Adult Contemporary (Billboard)	14
US Adult Pop Airplay (Billboard)	3
US Dance Airplay (Billboard)	1
US Dance Club Songs (Billboard)	1
US Hot R&B/Hip-Hop Songs (Billboard)	1
US Pop Airplay (Billboard)	1
US Rhythmic Airplay (Billboard)	4
US Rolling Stone Top 100	10

=== Monthly charts ===
Monthly chart performance for "Good as Hell"
Chart (2019)	Peak position
Latvia Airplay (LaIPA)	8

=== Year-end charts ===
2019 year-end chart performance for "Good as Hell"
Chart (2019)	Position
Australia (ARIA)	48
Belgium (Ultratop Flanders)	99
Ireland (IRMA)	46
UK Singles (OCC)	68
US Digital Song Sales (Billboard)	40
US Hot R&B/Hip-Hop Songs (Billboard)	47
US Mainstream Top 40 (Billboard)	50
US Rolling Stone Top 100	51

2020 year-end chart performance for "Good as Hell"
Chart (2020)	Position
Australia (ARIA)	48
Belgium (Ultratop Flanders)	58
Belgium (Ultratop Wallonia)	88
Canada (Canadian Hot 100)	33
UK Singles (OCC)	70
US Billboard Hot 100	31
US Adult Contemporary (Billboard)	34
US Adult Top 40 (Billboard)	14
US Dance/Mix Show Airplay (Billboard)	21
US Hot R&B/Hip-Hop Songs (Billboard)	16
US Mainstream Top 40 (Billboard)	14
US Rhythmic (Billboard)	35

2021 year-end chart performance for "Good as Hell"
Chart (2021)	Position
US R&B/Hip-Hop Digital Song Sales (Billboard)	27

== Certifications ==
Certifications for "Good as Hell"
Region	Certification	Certified units/sales
Australia (ARIA)	6× Platinum	420,000^{‡}
Austria (IFPI Austria)	Platinum	30,000^{‡}
Belgium (BRMA)	Gold	20,000^{‡}
Canada (Music Canada)	8× Platinum	640,000^{‡}
Denmark (IFPI Danmark)	Platinum	90,000^{‡}
Italy (FIMI)	Gold	35,000^{‡}
New Zealand (RMNZ)	4× Platinum	120,000^{‡}
Poland (ZPAV)	Gold	25,000^{‡}
United Kingdom (BPI)	2× Platinum	1,200,000^{‡}
United States (RIAA)	5× Platinum	5,000,000^{‡}
^{‡} Sales+streaming figures based on certification alone.

== Ariana Grande remix ==
"Good as Hell" (Remix)

Single by Lizzo featuring Ariana Grande

from the album Cuz I Love You (Super Deluxe)
- Released: October 25, 2019
- Recorded: July 2019
- Studio: Windmark Recording Studios (Santa Monica, CA)
- Length: 2:39
- Label: Atlantic; Nice Life
- Composers: Melissa Jefferson; Eric Frederic
- Lyricists: Melissa Jefferson; Ariana Grande
- Producer: Ricky Reed

Lizzo singles chronology
"Blame It on Your Love" (2019)	"Good as Hell" (Remix) (2019)	"Cuz I Love You" (2020)

Ariana Grande singles chronology
"Don't Call Me Angel" (2019)	"Good as Hell" (Remix) (2019)	"Time" (2020)

Lyric video
- "Good as Hell" (Remix) on YouTube

A remix of the song featuring the American singer Ariana Grande was released on October 25, 2019.

=== Track listing ===
Digital download

1. "Good as Hell" (featuring Ariana Grande) [Remix] – 2:39

Streaming

1. "Good as Hell" (featuring Ariana Grande) - Remix – 2:39
2. "Good as Hell" – 2:39

=== Accolades ===
Year	Ceremony	Category	Result	Ref.
2020	iHeartRadio Music Awards	Best Remix	Nominated	

=== Charts ===
Chart performance for "Good as Hell" (remix)
Chart (2019–2020)	Peak position
Greece (IFPI)	26
Lebanon (The Official Lebanese Top 20 English Chart)	20
Lithuania (AGATA)	26
Netherlands (Dutch Top 40)	28
Netherlands (Single Top 100)	50
New Zealand (Recorded Music NZ)	10
Portugal (AFP)	94
Romania (Airplay 100)	96
Sweden (Sverigetopplistan)	29

=== Certifications ===
Certifications for "Good as Hell" (remix)
Region	Certification	Certified units/sales
Brazil (Pro-Música Brasil)	Platinum	40,000^{‡}
France (SNEP)	Platinum	200,000^{‡}
New Zealand (RMNZ)	Platinum	30,000^{‡}
Norway (IFPI Norway)	Gold	30,000^{‡}
^{‡} Sales+streaming figures based on certification alone.

== Release history ==
Region	Date	Format(s)	Version	Label(s)	Ref.
Various	March 8, 2016	Digital download; streaming	Original	Atlantic; Nice Life	
Various	June 17, 2016	Digital download; streaming	Remixes	Atlantic; Nice Life	
United States	September 17, 2019	Rhythmic contemporary	Original	Atlantic; Nice Life	
Various	October 25, 2019	Digital download; streaming	Ariana Grande remix	Atlantic; Nice Life	
Italy	November 8, 2019	Radio airplay	Ariana Grande remix	Warner	
United States	November 11, 2019	Hot adult contemporary radio	Original	Atlantic; Nice Life	

== See also ==
- List of Billboard number-one dance songs of 2019
