= Truth Hurts (song) =

2017 song by Lizzo

Single by Lizzo

from the album Cuz I Love You (Deluxe)
- Released: September 19, 2017 (original); March 22, 2019 (re-released)
- Recorded: 2017
- Genre: Trap; hip hop; pop
- Length: 2:53
- Label: Atlantic; Nice Life
- Songwriters: Melissa Jefferson; Eric Frederic; Jesse Saint John; Steven Cheung; Amina Bogle-Barriteau
- Producers: Ricky Reed; Tele (co.)

Lizzo singles chronology
| "Water Me" (2017) | "Truth Hurts" (2017) | "Fitness" (2017) |

Audio sample
- file; help

Music video
- "Truth Hurts" on YouTube

"Truth Hurts" is a song released by American singer and rapper Lizzo. It was originally released on September 19, 2017, by Nice Life Recording Company and Atlantic Records, but then re-released as a radio single on March 22, 2019. It was written by Lizzo alongside Jesse Saint John and producers Steven "Tele" Cheung and Ricky Reed.

Music journalists have described "Truth Hurts" as trap, hip hop, and pop. Though it did not chart upon release, it became a viral sleeper hit in 2019 after gaining popularity on the TikTok video sharing app and being used in the Netflix movie Someone Great. The song was included as a bonus track on the deluxe version of Lizzo's third studio album Cuz I Love You (2019) and reached number one on the Billboard Hot 100, becoming Lizzo's first song to do so. She followed Lauryn Hill and Cardi B as the only female rappers to achieve that with a solo song. It spent seven weeks at number one, becoming the longest-running number-one for a solo song by a female rapper, earning her a Guinness World Record. It also reached number one in Chile as well as the top ten in Canada and New Zealand. It has over one billion streams on Spotify. The accompanying music video stars Lizzo playing a bride that marries herself.

The song received critical acclaim by music critics and, despite being released in 2017, was eligible for the 62nd Annual Grammy Awards in 2020, being nominated for three awards, including Record of the Year and Song of the Year, and winning for Best Pop Solo Performance. The song has been certified diamond by the Recording Industry Association of America (RIAA). Rolling Stone listed it as the 24th best song of the decade, and Billboard included it among the 100 songs that defined the decade. In 2021, it was included in Rolling Stone's 500 Greatest Songs of All Time.

== Composition ==
Musically, it is a trap, hip hop, and pop song led by a "glittering" piano loop. Lyrically, the song sees the singer addressing romantic problems, singing the lyrics, "'You coulda had a bad bitch, non-committal/ Help you with your career, just a little', she sings. 'You're 'posed to hold me down/ But you're holding me back/ And that's the sound of me not calling you back'."

During a 2019 concert in her native Detroit, Lizzo declared that "the person I wrote that song about is from Detroit."

== Commercial performance ==
=== North America ===
In the United States "Truth Hurts" became a sleeper hit two years after its release; the song was originally released in September 2017 and eventually charted in the spring of 2019. On the US Billboard Hot 100 chart, the song debuted at number 50 on the week ending May 18, 2019. Its high debut was due to a Billboard rule that affects songs older than one year from entering the Hot 100 unless obtaining a substantial number of chart points. The track reached number one in September 2019, becoming Lizzo's first number one song in the United States. "Truth Hurts" became the third solo song by a female rapper to top the Hot 100, following Lauryn Hill's "Doo Wop (That Thing)" and Cardi B's "Bodak Yellow". On its fourth week at number one, it became the longest-leading rap number one single by a female artist unaccompanied by another act in the chart's history, surpassing Cardi B's three-week reign with "Bodak Yellow" in October 2017. It spent seven non-consecutive weeks at number one, tying Iggy Azalea's "Fancy", featuring Charli XCX, for the longest-leading rap song by a female artist on the chart. On November 2, 2019, it was replaced by "Someone You Loved" by Lewis Capaldi.

"Truth Hurts" debuted at number 33 on Mainstream Top 40 following its entry on the Hot 100 and reached number one, giving Lizzo her first chart topper on that chart. The song also hit number one on the US Rhythmic chart, where it became Lizzo's first Billboard chart topper; and one of five songs to reach number one with a 5-1 jump on that chart since its October 1992 inception. On Billboard's Dance/Mix Show Airplay, the single became her first top 10, and also reached number one in September 2019 (spending nine weeks, the most ever for a Rap song recorded by a female Rap artist since its 2003 inception), eclipsing "Juice" which peaked at number 25 in May 2019. In Canada, "Truth Hurts" opened at number 43 on the Hot 100 for the week ending May 18, 2019; it has since peaked at number seven.

=== Europe and Oceania ===
In the United Kingdom, "Truth Hurts" has debuted at number 67 on the UK Singles Chart on the week ending May 9, 2019, later peaking at number 29 on the week ending September 19, 2019. In Belgium, the song entered the top 10 of the Belgian Singles Chart, at number two, becoming Lizzo's first and highest-charting entry in the country. The song also entered the top 10 of the Belgium Urban Singles Chart, at number nine, also becoming her first and highest-charting entry on the chart, respectively.

In New Zealand, "Truth Hurts" peaked at number five on the New Zealand Singles Chart. In Australia, the song entered the top 30, at number 21 on the week ending May 25, 2019. It has since reached number 15 there.

== Critical reception ==
"Truth Hurts" received critical acclaim by music critics. Ashley Monaé, writing for Pitchfork, stated the song contains "sobering moments of truth where Lizzo's charisma wins us over and sets her apart." DIY magazine wrote that the song "continues to show off her relatable rap." Rolling Stone staff stated that "yes, 'Truth Hurts' came out in 2017, but there's no denying the song's effect on not just Lizzo's career but the entire year in culture", and added that Lizzo "exhibits the ultimate form of self-care" on an "unstoppable breakup anthem."

=== Accolades ===
Critics' lists
| Publication | List | Rank | Ref. |
|---|---|---|---|
| Billboard | The 100 Songs That Defined the Decade | * | |
| Rolling Stone | The 50 Best Songs of 2019 | 2 | |
| Rolling Stone | The 100 Best Songs of the 2010s | 24 | |
| Rolling Stone | 500 Greatest Songs of All Time | 497 | |
| Elle | The 52 Best Songs That Defined the 2010s | * | |
| Uproxx | The Best Songs of the 2010s | 55 | |

* denotes an unordered list

== Music video ==
A music video was released to accompany "Truth Hurts", styled by Brooke Candy. It depicts the singer at a wedding, then leaving the groom at the altar. The video finishes with the singer marrying herself, followed by a dance party. Scenes of the singer in lingerie are interspersed throughout the video. As of September 2020, the music video has amassed more than 220 million views on YouTube. The video's story was later continued in the music video for "2 Be Loved (Am I Ready)", released in 2022.

== Live performances ==
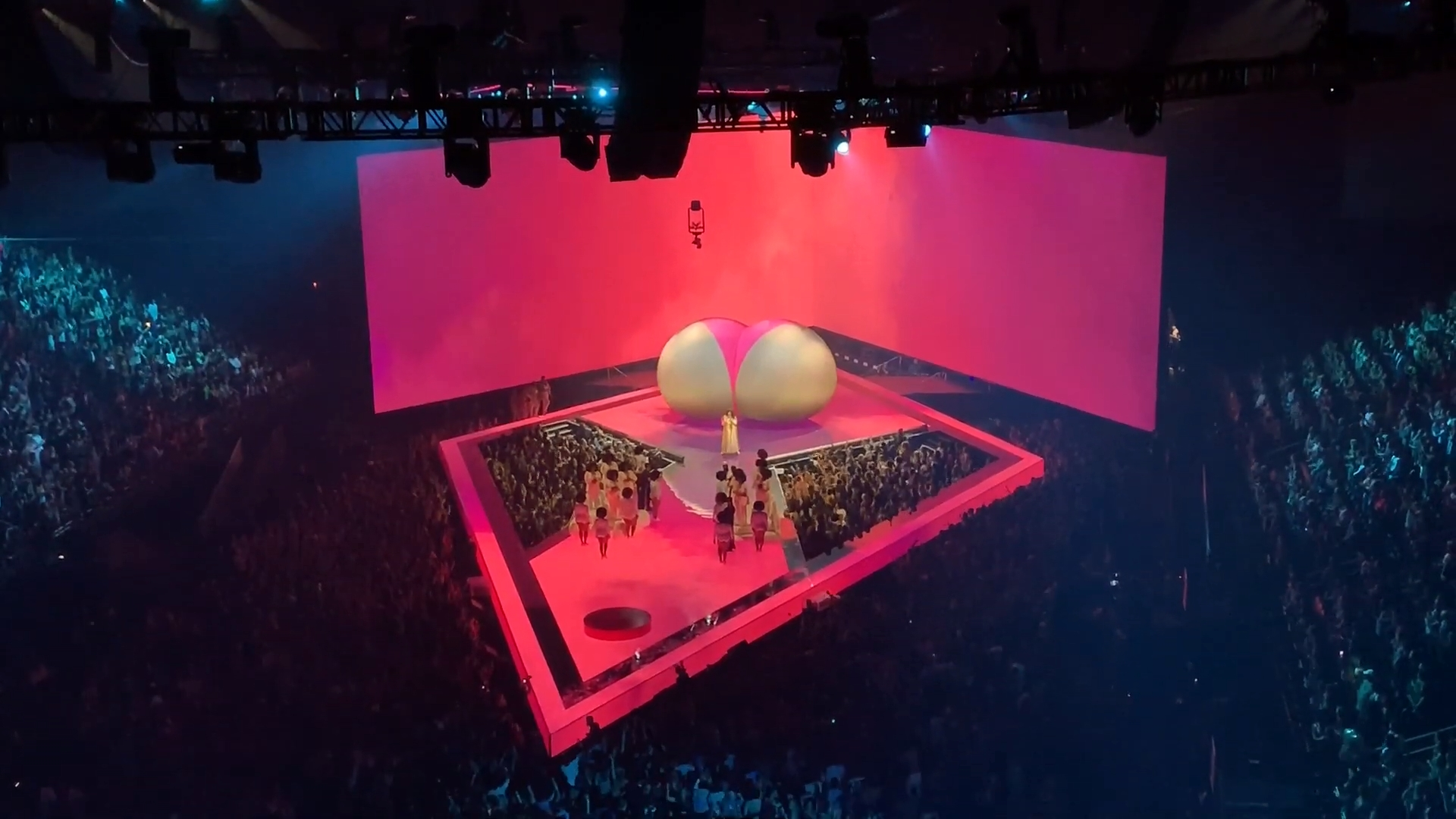
Lizzo performing at the 2019 MTV Video Music Awards in front of a bouncing "inflatable ass"

Lizzo performed "Truth Hurts" at the 2019 BET Awards. She opened the number on top of a big wedding cake wearing a white veil and a lacy white teddy, surrounded by dancers also wearing wedding dresses with bouquets in hands. The performance included a flute solo; "two bright trills" according to Classic FM. She also performed at the 2019 MTV Video Music Awards in a medley. She opened the VMAs performance wearing a cowgirl attire surrounded by dancers in front of an "inflatable ass" bouncing to the beat. Then, wearing a neon yellow leotard, she transitioned into "Good as Hell" with digital clouds in the background. In Rolling Stone, Rob Sheffield opined that Taylor Swift, Missy Elliott and Lizzo "saved" the ceremony, further adding that Lizzo "stole the show". Writing for Esquire, Matt Miller said that, "If there was a star-making performance of the night it was this one, an unforgettable moment that I'm hoping we'll see at more award shows".

Lizzo performed "Truth Hurts" on December 22, 2019, on Saturday Night Live accompanied by an all-female live band. For the intro, her guitarist Celisse Henderson paid homage to Sister Rosetta Tharpe by playing an altered version of the song's lead melody on a cream-colored Gibson SG Custom.

On January 26, 2020, Lizzo opened the 62nd Annual Grammy Awards with a medley of "Cuz I Love You" and "Truth Hurts". After performing "Cuz I Love You", ballerinas wearing do-rags appeared on stage as she changed into a Tron-esque, glow-in-the-dark bodysuit to perform "Truth Hurts". The Washington Post editors considered it "a classic Lizzo number, as she also dazzled the crowd by breaking out her flute for a solo". In USA Today, Patrick Ryan opined that the performance showed that "she's one of the most joyful entertainers in music right now". Rolling Stone editors opined that she "topped the whole thing off with five words that made the performance a mic-drop for the ages: "Welcome to the Grammys, bitch!"". The three publications ranked it among the best performances of the ceremony. She also performed a medley of "Cuz I Love You", "Truth Hurts", "Good as Hell" and "Juice" at the 2020 Brit Awards.

== Use in media ==
Lizzo performed the song on the season 45 episode of Saturday Night Live hosted by former cast member Eddie Murphy.

The song's lyrics in which she references the Minnesota Vikings were edited out by one station: Top 40/CHR WIXX in Green Bay, due to the Packers' rivalry with them and the station broadcasting games on the Packers Radio Network. Atlantic allowed the station to make changes to the song and was ultimately "cool with it" when it came to the adjustment.

In a 2020 episode of the American game show Jeopardy!, host Alex Trebek recited the lyrics as a clue in the category "Lyrics of Today." Once a contestant gave the correct answer, Trebek quipped, "I did it exactly like (Lizzo) does, didn't I?"

== Awards and nominations ==
| Year | Ceremony | Category | Result | Ref. |
|---|---|---|---|---|
| 2019 | MTV Video Music Awards | Song of Summer | Nominated | |
| 2019 | Teen Choice Awards | Choice Summer Song | Nominated | |
| 2019 | Guinness World Records | Most weeks at No.1 on the US singles charts for a rap single by a female artist | Won | |
| 2020 | Grammy Awards | Record of the Year | Nominated | |
| 2020 | Grammy Awards | Song of the Year | Nominated | |
| 2020 | Grammy Awards | Best Pop Solo Performance | Won | |
| 2020 | iHeartRadio Music Awards | Song of the Year | Won | |
| 2020 | iHeartRadio Titanium Awards | 1 Billion Total Audience Spins on iHeartRadio Stations | Won | |
| 2020 | BMI Pop Awards | Award Winning Songs | Won | |
| 2020 | BMI R&B/Hip-Hop Awards | Award Winning Songs | Won | |
| 2020 | Billboard Music Awards | Top Hot 100 Song | Nominated | |
| 2020 | Billboard Music Awards | Top Rap Song | Nominated | |
| 2020 | Billboard Music Awards | Top Selling Song | Nominated | |
| 2020 | Billboard Music Awards | Top Radio Song | Nominated | |

== Remixes ==
Two official remixes of "Truth Hurts" were released by Lizzo. One features production from the DJ CID and was released on August 22, 2019. The other features Charlotte rapper DaBaby and was released on August 23, 2019. The release of the remixes were an effort to get "Truth Hurts" to reach number one on the Billboard Hot 100. A limited edition vinyl included an extended version of the CID remix. On September 24, 2019, a third remix featuring South Korean boy band AB6IX was released.

== Controversies ==
Endorphina
(@MinaLioness)
tweeted:

I did a DNA test and found out I'm 100% that bitch.

February 24, 2017

"Truth Hurts" was the subject of two allegations of plagiarism concerning its opening line "I just took a DNA test, turns out I'm 100% that bitch". After Lizzo filed a trademark application for the phrase "100% that bitch" on June 10, 2019, singer Mina Lioness (Amina Bogle-Barriteau) tweeted on August 28 that she shared a similar Twitter post in February 2017 "I did a DNA test and found out I'm 100% that bitch." Lizzo responded that her use of the phrase "I'm 100% that bitch" was based on an Instagram meme and that she was not aware of Lioness's original tweet.

On October 15, producers Justin and Jeremiah Raisen posted on Instagram that the opening line was lifted from an unreleased demo, "Healthy", that they co-wrote with Lizzo and other songwriters. They attributed the lyric to Lioness's tweet. In response, Lizzo's lawyer stated that the Raisens did not co-write "Truth Hurts" and that the Raisens "expressly renounced any claim to the work, in writing, months ago".

Lioness was credited as a co-writer of the song on October 23, 2019. On the same day, Lizzo filed a lawsuit against the Raisens for alleged harassment. In an Instagram post, Lizzo wrote "The creator of the tweet is the person I am sharing my success with...not these men. Period."

Lioness posted a Tweet on October 23, 2019, saying "I just took a DNA test, turns out I'm a credited writer for the number one song on Billboard."

== Track listing ==
Digital download

1. "Truth Hurts" – 2:53
2. "Truth Hurts" (DaBaby Remix) (featuring DaBaby) – 3:17
3. "Truth Hurts" (CID Remix) – 2:58

12" single

1. "Truth Hurts" – 2:53
2. "Truth Hurts" (DaBaby Remix) – 3:17
3. "Truth Hurts" (CID Remix) – 2:58
4. "Truth Hurts" (CID Remix Extended) – 3:55

== Personnel ==
Adapted from Tidal.

- Lizzo – lead artist, songwriter
- Ricky Reed – producer, songwriter
- Jesse Saint John – songwriter
- Steven Cheung – songwriter
- Mina Lioness – songwriter
- Tele – co-producer
- Ethan Shumaker – engineer
- Chris Gehringer – masterer
- Manny Marroquin – mixer
- Chris Galland – mixing engineer
- Robin Florent – assistant mix engineer
- Scott Desmarais – assistant mix engineer

== Charts ==
=== Weekly charts ===
Weekly chart performance for "Truth Hurts"
| Chart (2019–2020) | Peak position |
|---|---|
| Australia (ARIA) | 15 |
| Belgium (Ultratop 50 Flanders) | 50 |
| Belgium Urban (Ultratop Flanders) | 9 |
| Belgium (Ultratip Bubbling Under Wallonia) | 11 |
| Belgium Urban (Ultratop Wallonia) | 32 |
| Canada Hot 100 (Billboard) | 7 |
| Canada CHR/Top 40 (Billboard) | 3 |
| Canada Hot AC (Billboard) | 28 |
| Chile (IFPI) | 1 |
| China Airplay/FL (Billboard) | 24 |
| Colombia (National-Report) | 63 |
| Czech Republic Singles Digital (ČNS IFPI) | 66 |
| France Downloads (SNEP) | 167 |
| Greece (IFPI) | 30 |
| Ireland (IRMA) | 15 |
| Latvia (LAIPA) | 16 |
| Lithuania (AGATA) | 21 |
| Netherlands (Single Top 100) | 78 |
| New Zealand (Recorded Music NZ) | 5 |
| Puerto Rico (Monitor Latino) | 13 |
| Scottish Singles Sales (Official Charts) | 25 |
| Slovakia Singles Digital (ČNS IFPI) | 38 |
| Sweden Heatseeker (Sverigetopplistan) | 2 |
| Switzerland (Schweizer Hitparade) | 94 |
| UK Singles (Official Charts) | 29 |
| UK Hip Hop/R&B (Official Charts) | 16 |
| US Billboard Hot 100 | 1 |
| US Adult Contemporary (Billboard) | 30 |
| US Adult Pop Airplay (Billboard) | 9 |
| US Dance Airplay (Billboard) | 1 |
| US Dance Club Songs (Billboard) | 19 |
| US Hot R&B/Hip-Hop Songs (Billboard) | 1 |
| US Pop Airplay (Billboard) | 1 |
| US Rhythmic Airplay (Billboard) | 1 |
| US Rolling Stone Top 100 | 1 |

=== Year-end charts ===
2019 year-end chart performance for "Truth Hurts"
| Chart (2019) | Position |
|---|---|
| Australia (ARIA) | 31 |
| Canada (Canadian Hot 100) | 23 |
| Iceland (Tónlistinn) | 84 |
| Ireland (IRMA) | 40 |
| Latvia (LAIPA) | 42 |
| New Zealand (Recorded Music NZ) | 21 |
| UK Singles (Official Charts Company) | 93 |
| US Billboard Hot 100 | 13 |
| US Adult Top 40 (Billboard) | 36 |
| US Dance/Mix Show Airplay (Billboard) | 3 |
| US Hot R&B/Hip-Hop Songs (Billboard) | 5 |
| US Mainstream Top 40 (Billboard) | 10 |
| US Rhythmic (Billboard) | 6 |
| US Rolling Stone Top 100 | 6 |

2020 year-end chart performance for "Truth Hurts"
| Chart (2020) | Position |
|---|---|
| US Billboard Hot 100 | 55 |
| US Hot R&B/Hip-Hop Songs (Billboard) | 68 |
| US Mainstream Top 40 (Billboard) | 44 |

== Certifications ==
Certifications and sales of "Truth Hurts"
| Region | Certification | Certified units/sales |
|---|---|---|
| Australia (ARIA) | 3× Platinum | 210,000^{‡} |
| Austria (IFPI Austria) | Gold | 15,000^{‡} |
| Brazil (Pro-Música Brasil) | Diamond | 250,000^{‡} |
| Canada (Music Canada) | 9× Platinum | 720,000^{‡} |
| Chile | 2× Platinum | |
| Denmark (IFPI Danmark) | Gold | 45,000^{‡} |
| France (SNEP) | Gold | 100,000^{‡} |
| Italy (FIMI) | Gold | 35,000^{‡} |
| Netherlands (NVPI) | Gold | 20,000^{‡} |
| New Zealand (RMNZ) | 4× Platinum | 120,000^{‡} |
| Norway (IFPI Norway) | Gold | 30,000^{‡} |
| Poland (ZPAV) | Gold | 25,000^{‡} |
| Portugal (AFP) | Gold | 5,000^{‡} |
| United Kingdom (BPI) | Platinum | 600,000^{‡} |
| United States (RIAA) | Diamond | 10,000,000^{‡} |
^{‡} Sales+streaming figures based on certification alone.

== Release history ==
Release dates for "Truth Hurts"
| Region | Date | Format(s) | Version(s) | Label(s) | Ref. |
|---|---|---|---|---|---|
| Various | September 19, 2017 | Digital download; streaming | Original | Atlantic; Nice Life | |
| United States | March 22, 2019 | Contemporary hit radio | Original | Atlantic | |
| Italy | August 2, 2019 | Radio airplay | Original | Warner | |
| Various | August 22, 2019 | Digital download; streaming | CID remix | Atlantic; Nice Life | |
| Various | August 22, 2019 | Digital download; streaming | DaBaby remix | Atlantic; Nice Life | |
| Various | August 26, 2019 | Limited 12-inch vinyl | Original; Remixes | Atlantic; Nice Life | |
