= Boys (Lizzo song) =

2018 funk and pop song by Lizzo

Single by Lizzo
- Released: June 22, 2018
- Genre: Funk; pop; electropop
- Length: 2:53
- Label: Atlantic
- Songwriters: Melissa Jefferson; Nate Mercereau; Ricky Reed; Aaron Puckett
- Producer: Ricky Reed

Lizzo singles chronology
"Fitness" (2018)	"Boys" (2018)	"Juice" (2019)

"Boys" is a song recorded by American singer and rapper Lizzo. It was released for digital consumption on June 22, 2018, through Atlantic Records as a single. It was written by Lizzo, Nate Mercereau, Ricky Reed, and Aaron Puckett, while Reed handled the song's production. Musically, "Boys" is a retro funk, pop, and electropop song that contains a heavy bassline and pop chorus. Lyrically, it is an ode to the singer's dating pool.

"Boys" was positively received by music critics, one of whom compared it to Charli XCX's 2017 song of the same name. Time magazine put the song at number 10 on their Top Ten Best Songs of 2018. The song became Lizzo's first single to enter a commercial chart, reaching the top forty in Belgium. An accompanying music video was released alongside the single, which features the singer performing the song in front of the Minneapolis music note wall, as well as several other locations. To promote the single, four remixes were commissioned for the single.

== Composition ==
"Boys" is a retro-inspired funk, pop, and electropop song that contains a heavy bassline, tinkling cowbell, and groovy guitar licks, leading to a "pop-heavy" chorus. The song has been described as containing "sparse but thumping beats". It is lyrically described as a "bouncy" tribute to the singer's dating pool, where she raps the lyrics "I like big boys, itty bitty boys / Mississippi boys, inner city boys." The singer then sings in the chorus that her desiring companionship does not equal needing commitment.

== Critical reception ==
Eric Torres of Pitchfork called the song an "ecstatic, endlessly replayable tribute to the depths of Lizzo’s dating pool." Chris Thomas writing for Out called the song the "spiritual companion to Charli XCX's earworm track of the same name"; the two would later collaborate in 2019 on the song "Blame It on Your Love". Justin Myers, writing for the Official Charts Company, called the song "attitude-packed".

== Music video ==
A music video directed by Quinn Wilson and Andy Madeleine was released alongside the single. The video features Lizzo dancing in front of the Minneapolis music note wall, dancing in a male bathroom, and lying on a scattering of flower petals. Lizzo switches between a variety of outfits, while several males play a supporting role in the video.

== Track listing ==
Digital download

1. "Boys" – 2:52

Pink Panda Remix

1. "Boys" (Pink Panda Remix) – 2:23

Dave Audé Remix

1. "Boys" (Dave Audé Remix) – 4:27

Black Caviar Remix

1. "Boys" (Black Caviar Remix) – 3:54

Juice Boys Remix

1. "Boys" (Juice Boys Remix) – 2:37

Boys (Remixes) — EP

1. "Boys" – 2:52
2. "Boys" (Pink Panda Remix) – 2:23
3. "Boys" (Dave Audé Remix) – 4:27
4. "Boys" (Black Caviar Remix) – 3:54
5. "Boys" (Juice Boys Remix) – 2:37

== Personnel ==
Adapted from Tidal.

- Lizzo – vocals, composition
- Ricky Reed – composition, production
- Nate Mercereau – composition
- Aaron Puckett – composition
- Chris Gehringer – mastering

== Charts ==
Chart (2018–2019)	Peak position
Belgium (Ultratop 50 Wallonia)	37
Canada Hot 100 (Billboard)	89
Ireland (IRMA)	89
Israel (Media Forest)	1
US Bubbling Under Hot 100 (Billboard)	19

== Certifications ==
Region	Certification	Certified units/sales
Australia (ARIA)	Platinum	70,000^{‡}
Austria (IFPI Austria)	Gold	15,000^{‡}
Canada (Music Canada)	2× Platinum	160,000^{‡}
France (SNEP)	Gold	100,000^{‡}
New Zealand (RMNZ)	Gold	15,000^{‡}
Poland (ZPAV)	Gold	25,000^{‡}
United Kingdom (BPI)	Silver	200,000^{‡}
United States (RIAA)	Platinum	1,000,000^{‡}
^{‡} Sales+streaming figures based on certification alone.

== Release history ==
Region	Date	Format	Version	Label	Ref.
Various	June 22, 2018	Digital download; streaming	Original	Atlantic; Nice Life	
Various	August 24, 2018	Digital download; streaming	Pink Panda Remix	Atlantic; Nice Life	
Various	September 14, 2018	Digital download; streaming	Dave Audé Remix	Atlantic; Nice Life	
Various	October 5, 2018	Digital download; streaming	Black Caviar Remix	Atlantic; Nice Life	
Various	October 19, 2018	Digital download; streaming	Juice Boys Remix	Atlantic; Nice Life	
Various	February 22, 2019	Digital download; streaming	Remix EP	Atlantic; Nice Life	
