= Cuz I Love You (song) =

2019 song by Lizzo

Single by Lizzo

from the album Cuz I Love You
- Released: January 28, 2020
- Genre: Soul
- Length: 3:00
- Label: Atlantic; Nice Life
- Songwriters: Melissa Jefferson; Sam Harris; Casey Harris; Adam Levin; Russ Flynn
- Producer: X Ambassadors

Lizzo singles chronology
"Good as Hell" (remix) (2019)	"Cuz I Love You" (2020)	"Rumors" (2021)

Music video
- "Cuz I Love You" on YouTube

"Cuz I Love You" is a song by American singer and rapper Lizzo. It was originally released on February 14, 2019, as the first promotional single from her third studio album of the same name. It was serviced to top 40 radio stations on January 28, 2020, as the second single from the album. Lizzo performed the song as the opening number of the 62nd Annual Grammy Awards on January 26, 2020.

== Composition ==
"Cuz I Love You" was written by Lizzo alongside American rock band X Ambassadors, the latter of whom provided production for the track. Musically, "Cuz I Love You" is a big band-inspired soul song that showcases Lizzo's vocal ability. Lizzo's performance in the song has been compared to that of Darlene Love. The number begins with the singer loudly belting "I’m crying/Cuz I love you" before being accompanied by a brass and percussion-heavy band. The song's lyrical content discusses the singer entering a relationship with someone special and departing from her previous approaches to romance. The song title, as well as some of the lyrics, are obviously inspired by Slade's 1971 single "Coz I Luv You".

== Critical reception ==
Alex Young of Consequence of Sound deemed the song "a soulful big band offering in the vein [of] Darlene Love that showcases Lizzo's immense vocal prowess". Bailey Calfee, writing for Nylon, wrote that the track "lets Lizzo flex her unbeatable vocal range, and we hear her belting to the gods. In the song, she gives an emotional confession of love to an unknown suitor, who has seemingly made her realize what true love really feels like." Katherine Gillespie of Paper called the song "a big band soul moment that fully harnesses her impressive vocal powers." Brittany Spanos of Rolling Stone wrote that the song "offers a fiery taste of her incredibly vocal and genre range".

== Music video ==
The music video for "Cuz I Love You" was directed by Quinn Wilson. The black-and-white visual for the album sees the singer adopt the role of a priest, and give a church session for several worshipping men.

== Charts ==
Chart (2020)	Peak position
Belgium (Ultratip Bubbling Under Flanders)	27
Canada CHR/Top 40 (Billboard)	29
Canada Hot AC (Billboard)	44
Scottish Singles Sales (Official Charts)	54
UK Singles Downloads (Official Charts)	59
US Bubbling Under Hot 100 (Billboard)	14
US Adult Pop Airplay (Billboard)	35
US Hot R&B Songs (Billboard)	16
US Pop Airplay (Billboard)	22
US R&B/Hip-Hop Digital Song Sales (Billboard)	14
US Rhythmic Airplay (Billboard)	35

== Certifications ==
Region	Certification	Certified units/sales
Brazil (Pro-Música Brasil)	Gold	20,000^{‡}
Canada (Music Canada)	Gold	40,000^{‡}
United States (RIAA)	Gold	500,000^{‡}
^{‡} Sales+streaming figures based on certification alone.

== Release history ==
Release dates and formats for "Cuz I Love You"
Region	Date	Format	Label	Ref.
Various	February 14, 2019	Digital download; streaming	Atlantic	
United States	January 28, 2020	Contemporary hit radio	Atlantic	
United States	February 3, 2020	Hot adult contemporary radio	Atlantic	
