= Juice (Lizzo song) =

2019 single by Lizzo

Single by Lizzo

from the album Cuz I Love You
- Released: January 4, 2019
- Genre: Funk-pop; hip hop; new wave
- Length: 3:15
- Label: Atlantic
- Songwriters: Melissa Jefferson; Eric Frederic; Theron Thomas; Sam Sumser; Sean Small
- Producers: Ricky Reed; Nate Mercereau (add.)

Lizzo singles chronology
"Boys" (2018)	"Juice" (2019)	"Blame It on Your Love" (2019)

Music video
- "Juice" on YouTube

"Juice" is a song recorded by American singer and rapper Lizzo. It was released on January 4, 2019, by Atlantic Records as the lead single from her third and debut major-label studio album, Cuz I Love You. The single was written by Lizzo, Theron Thomas, Sam Sumser, Sean Small and Ricky Reed; the latter also handled the song's production. Musically, it is a retro-inspired funk and funk-pop song that is based on a throwback groove. Lyrically, the song discusses self-love, and has been described as a self-esteem anthem.

The song received widespread acclaim from critics, some of whom referred to the song as Lizzo's best. Commercially, the single entered component R&B charts in the United States, while also reaching the top twenty in Scotland. The track is certified Double Platinum in the US and Gold or Platinum in five additional countries. A music video was released alongside the single, which contains several 1980s pop culture references. To promote the single, Lizzo performed the song on several shows, including The Ellen DeGeneres Show, The Today Show, Jimmy Kimmel Live! and The Tonight Show Starring Jimmy Fallon.

The song is one of the tracks on the American version of Now That's What I Call Music! 71, released on August 2, 2019. In September 2019, the song spawned an internet meme after Polygon writer Jeff Ramos cut a trailer for House House's Untitled Goose Game using the song as its anthem. It was covered by Beth Ditto on the country music drama series Monarch.

== Composition ==
"Juice" is a "bouncy", retro-inspired funk, funk-pop, and hip hop song with a heavy rap. Lizzo's delivery of the song has been described as "witty" and "full of fire". The single contains "midnight production" and a burnished throwback groove. It also has reverb-heavy guitar and "smug" spoken word. It contains "delightfully outrageous" lines such as "I be drippin' so much sauce / Got a bih lookin' like Ragu." The song lyrically talks about self-love, and has been described as a "self-esteem boosting anthem".

It is composed in the key of D minor. It has a chord progression of Dm7 - Fsus7 - F7 - Bbmaj7+9 - C7, with Lizzo's vocals ranging from C_{4} to D_{5}.

== Critical reception ==
"Juice" received widespread acclaim from music critics upon release. Lollie King of Bustle wrote that the song "is sure to give you that much-needed confidence boost when you're feeling low." Christian Hoard, writing for Rolling Stone, praised the song as the singer's "finest" single to date, and called it "a near-perfect retro-funk nugget that would have felt just right on a mirror-balled dance floor in 1982." Joshua Bote, writing for NPR, stated that the song "continues [Lizzo's] winning streak of sing-songy, funk-heavy rap". Michael Roffman of Consequence of Sound wrote that the song "doubles as a jam and one of those dusty workout tapes you've got lying around your house." Pitchfork listed the song as the 53rd best of 2019. Billboard magazine ranked "Juice" 46th on their Best Songs of 2019 list, calling it "irresistibly immediate and durably relistenable".

=== Accolades ===
Year	Ceremony	Category	Result	Ref.
2019	American Music Awards	Favorite Song — Soul/R&B	Nominated	
2019	Q Awards	Best Track	Nominated	
2019	Soul Train Music Awards	Song of the Year	Nominated	
2019	Soul Train Music Awards	Video of the Year	Won	
2019	Soul Train Music Awards	The Ashford and Simpson Songwriter's Award	Nominated	
2019	Soul Train Music Awards	Best Dance Performance	Nominated	
2020	Queerty Awards	Anthem	Won	

== Live performances ==
Lizzo performed the song on The Ellen DeGeneres Show, Today, Jimmy Kimmel Live! and The Tonight Show Starring Jimmy Fallon.

== Music video ==
The music video for "Juice" was released the same day as the single. The video, directed by Quinn Wilson, features the singer in an '80s-style workout program, late-night talk show, and selling products on an infomercial. It also contains references to Soul Glo commercials and a reference to ASMR YouTuber Spirit Payton. Taylor Bryant of Nylon magazine described the video as "just as fun as the song". The 2020 video game Just Dance 2021 has it as one of the dance songs.

A second music video, directed by Pete Williams, premiered on the WOWPresents YouTube channel on April 17, 2019. It features Lizzo with RuPaul's Drag Race alumni A'keria C. Davenport, Silky Nutmeg Ganache, Soju, Mayhem Miller, Asia O'Hara, Mariah Paris Balenciaga, Detox Icunt, Morgan McMichaels and Sonique. It was also used in the official trailer for Tim Story's 2021 film Tom & Jerry: The Movie as well as in a music video emphasising Tom's struggle to catch Jerry in the film.

== In popular culture ==
A screenshot of Lizzo's YouTube channel promoting the song became an Internet meme. The screenshot shows her YouTube profile picture, banner, and thumbnail for the song's music video are all the same image of Lizzo from the cover art. Users found this repetition of the image on her channel to be humorous, and compared it to other scenarios.

== Plagiarism allegation ==
On October 18, 2019, singer CeCe Peniston accused Lizzo of plagiarizing the song's "Yeah-yeah" ad-lib from her 1990s single "Finally". Lizzo's lawyer rejected the claim, describing it as "opportunistic" and "specious".

== Track listing ==
Digital download

1. "Juice" – 3:15

Digital download — Breakbot Mix

1. "Juice" (Breakbot Mix) – 2:52

== Personnel ==
Adapted from Tidal.

- Lizzo – lead artist, songwriter
- Theron Thomas – songwriter, background vocals
- Ricky Reed – songwriter, producer, guitar, keyboards, programming
- Sam Sumser – songwriter
- Sean Small – songwriter
- Nate Mercereau – additional producer, guitar
- Asha Maura – background vocals
- Quinn Wilson – background vocals
- Shelby Swain – background vocals
- Jesse McGinty – saxophone
- Lemar Guillary – trombone
- Michael Cordone – trumpet
- Victor Indrizzo – percussion
- Robin Florent – mixer
- Manny Marroquin – mixer
- Scott Desmarais – mixer
- Chris Gehringer – masterer
- Ethan Shumaker – engineer
- Bill Malina – engineer
- Rouble Kapoor – assistant engineer

== Charts ==
=== Weekly charts ===
Chart (2019–2020)	Peak position
Australia (ARIA)	100
Belgium (Ultratip Bubbling Under Flanders)	5
Belgium (Ultratip Bubbling Under Wallonia)	14
Canada Hot 100 (Billboard)	86
Canada CHR/Top 40 (Billboard)	36
Croatia (HRT)	16
Finland (Radiosoittolista)	56
France (SNEP)	100
Ireland (IRMA)	51
Israel (Media Forest)	4
Italy (FIMI)	89
Lithuania (AGATA)	86
Mexico (Billboard Ingles Airplay)	6
Netherlands (Dutch Top 40)	34
Switzerland Airplay (Schweizer Hitparade)	61
Scotland Singles (Official Charts)	14
South Korea (Gaon)	93
UK Singles (Official Charts)	38
US Billboard Hot 100	82
US Adult Pop Airplay (Billboard)	37
US Dance Club Songs (Billboard)	44
US Dance Airplay (Billboard)	26
US Hot R&B/Hip-Hop Songs (Billboard)	27
US Pop Airplay (Billboard)	28
US Rolling Stone Top 100	54

=== Year-end charts ===
Chart (2019)	Position
Tokyo (Tokio Hot 100)	26
US Digital Song Sales (Billboard)	63
US Hot R&B/Hip-Hop Songs (Billboard)	90

== Certifications ==
Region	Certification	Certified units/sales
Australia (ARIA)	5× Platinum	350,000^{‡}
Austria (IFPI Austria)	Gold	15,000^{‡}
Brazil (Pro-Música Brasil)	2× Platinum	80,000^{‡}
Canada (Music Canada)	3× Platinum	240,000^{‡}
Denmark (IFPI Danmark)	Gold	45,000^{‡}
France (SNEP)	Platinum	200,000^{‡}
Italy (FIMI)	Gold	25,000^{‡}
New Zealand (RMNZ)	2× Platinum	60,000^{‡}
Poland (ZPAV)	Gold	25,000^{‡}
Portugal (AFP)	Gold	5,000^{‡}
United Kingdom (BPI)	Platinum	600,000^{‡}
United States (RIAA)	2× Platinum	2,000,000^{‡}
^{‡} Sales+streaming figures based on certification alone.

== Release history ==
Region	Date	Format	Version	Label	Ref.
Various	January 4, 2019	Digital download	Original	Atlantic	
Italy	March 1, 2019	Contemporary hit radio	Original	Warner	
United States	April 2, 2019	Contemporary hit radio	Original	Atlantic	
United States	April 8, 2019	Hot adult contemporary radio	Original	Atlantic	
Various	May 10, 2019	Digital download	Breakbot Mix	Atlantic	
