= 2010 UK Music Video Awards =

- Date: 12 October 2010
- Location: Leicester Square, London
- Hosted by: Adam Buxton
- Website: www.ukmva.com

The 2010 UK Music Video Awards were held on 12 October 2010 at the Odeon West End in Leicester Square, London to recognise the best in music videos and music film making from United Kingdom and worldwide. The nominations were announced on 20 September 2010. American rock band OK Go won Video of the Year for "This Too Shall Pass (Rube Goldberg Machine vsn)" directed by James Frost, Synn Labs and OK Go.

== Video of the Year ==
Video of the Year
- OK Go - "This Too Shall Pass (Rube Goldberg Machine vsn)"
  (Directors: James Frost, Synn Labs, OK Go)

== Icon Award ==
The Icon Award

Hammer & Tongs

== Video Genre Categories ==
Best Pop Video	Best Rock Video
Plan B - "Prayin'" (Director: Daniel Wolfe): Cheryl Cole - "Parachute"; Florence and the Machine - "Dog Days Are Over"; The Hoosiers - "Choices"; Hurts - "Better Than Love"; Plan B - "She Said"	OK Go - "This Too Shall Pass (Rube Goldberg Machine vsn)" (Directors: James Frost, Synn Labs, OK Go): Biffy Clyro - "God and Satan"; Blood Red Shoes - "Light It Up"; Fanfarlo - "Fire Escape"; Interpol - "Lights"; The Temper Trap - "Love Lost"
Best Indie/Alternative Video	Best Dance Video
Charlotte Gainsbourg ft. Beck - "Heaven Can Wait" (Director: Keith Schofield): Foals - "Miami"; LCD Soundsystem - "Drunk Girls"; The xx - "Islands"; WhoMadeWho - "Keep Me in My Plane"; Yeasayer - "Ambling Alp"	Hot Chip - "I Feel Better" (Director: Peter Serafinowicz): Cinnamon Chasers - "Luv Deluxe"; Massive Attack - "Paradise Circus"; Massive Attack - "Splitting the Atom"; M.I.A. - "Born Free"; Miike Snow - "The Rabbit"
Best Urban Video	Best International Video
Jay Z ft. Swizz Beatz - "On to the Next One" (Director: Sam Brown): Chiddy Bang - "Opposite of Adults"; Kanye West - "Power"; Kid Cudi - "Pursuit of Happiness"; Plan B - "Stay Too Long"; Tinie Tempah - "Pass Out"	Lady Gaga - "Bad Romance" (Director: Francis Lawrence): Lady Gaga featuring Beyoncé - "Telephone"; Lenny Kravitz vs Justice - "Let Love Rule (Remix)"; Major Lazer - "Pon de Floor"; OK Go - "End Love"; The Hickey Underworld - "Blonde Fire"
Best Budget/Independent Video – Rock, Indie, Alternative	Best Budget/Independent Video – Pop, Dance, Urban
SOUR - "Hibi No Neiro" (Directors: Masashi Kawamura, Hal Kirkland, Who-Fu (Magico&Masayoshi)): Ash - "Carnal Love"; John Grant - "Chicken Bones"; Jon Allen - "Dead Man's Suit"; The Maccabees - "Young Lions"; The Wave Pictures - "Sweetheart"	Example - "Watch the Sun Come Up (Devil's Gun Zeitgeist Remix)" (Director: Ben Newman): Breakbot - "Baby I'm Yours"; Hecq vs Exillion - "Spheres of Fury"; Nweport - "Newport (Ymerodraeth State of Mind)"; The Candle Thieves - "We're All Gonna Die (Have Fun)"; Ratatat - "Drugs"

== Craft and Technical Categories ==
Best Animation in a Video	Best Art Direction in a Video
Gorillaz - "On Melancholy Hill" (Animators: Jamie Hewlett & Pete Candeland): Benga - "Baltimore Clap"; Breakbot - "Baby I'm Yours"; Massive Attack - "Splitting the Atom"; Paolo Nutini - "Pencil Full of Lead"; Editors - "Eat Raw Meat = Blood Drool"	Plan B - "Prayin'" (Art Director: Sam Tidman): Cheryl - "3 Words"; Katie Melua - "The Flood"; Local Natives - "Airplanes"; Robbie Williams - "You Know Me"; WhoMadeWho - "Keep Me in My Plane"
Best Cinematography in a Video	Best Editing in a Video
Plan B - "Stay too Long" (DOP: Lol Crawley): Dancing Pigeons - "Rtalin"; Foals - "Spanish Sahara"; Laura Marling - "Rambling Man"; Plan B - "Prayin'"; The Maccabees - "Empty Vessels"	Jay Z ft. Swizz Beatz - "On to the Next One" (Editor: Amanda James): Hadouken! - "Mic Check"; Hot Chip - "I Feel Better"; Laura Marling - "Rambling Man"; Plan B - "Prayin'"; Plan B - "Stay too Long"
Best Styling in a Video	Best Telecine in a Video
Plan B - "Stay too Long" (Stylist: Hannah Edwards): Florence and the Machine - "Dog Days Are Over"; Mystery Jets - "Dreaming of Another World"; Plan B - "Prayin'"; Tinashe - "Saved"; V V Brown - "Game Over"	Biffy Clyro - "God and Satan" (TK: Simone Grattarola at Rushes): Cheryl - "Parachute"; DJ Fresh - "Gold Dust"; Jay Z featuring Swizz Beatz - "On to the Next One"; Plan B - "Stay Too Long"; The Temper Trap - "Love Lost"
Best Visual Effects in a Video	Best Live Music Coverage
Audio Bullys - "Only Man" (VFX: Mathematic Studio): Cheryl - "3 Words"; Gramophonedzie - "Why Don't You"; Iron Maiden - "The Final Frontier"; Kanye West - "Power"; Lily Allen - "Fuck You"	The Prodigy - "Take Me to the Hospital" (Director: Paul Dugdale): Blur - Live at Hyde Park; Paul McCartney - Good Evening New York City; Barclaycard Mercury Prize Session; The Killers - Live from the Royal Albert Hall; The Specials - 30th Anniversary Tour
Innovation Award	Best Music Advertisement - Television or Online
Johnny Cash - "Ain't No Grave" (Director: Chris Milk): Kanye West - "Power"; One Frame of Fame; Pendulum - "Salt in the Wounds"; Placebo - "The Never Ending Why Sour"	Dizzee Rascal - "Tongue n' Cheek" (Director: Chris Boyle): Calvin Harris - "Humanthesizer"; Glen Millar - "The Very Best Of"; Kasabian - "Football Hero"; Ministry of Sound - "Electronic 80's"; Robert Plant - "Band of Joy"

== Individual and Company Categories ==
Best Director	Best New Director
Daniel Wolfe	Ben Newman
Best Producer	Best Commissioner
Tim Francis	Ross Anderson
