= Kelli-Leigh =

British singer and songwriter

- Born: Kelli-Leigh Henry-Davila; 15 July 1985 (age 41)
- Genres: Pop; dance; house
- Instrument: Vocals
- Website: www.kelli-leigh.com

Kelli-Leigh Henry-Glover (born 15 July 1985), known simply as Kelli-Leigh, is a British singer and songwriter.

She is best known for being the uncredited vocalist in the UK number-one singles "I Got U" by Duke Dumont featuring Jax Jones (cover of Whitney Houston's "My Love Is Your Love") and "I Wanna Feel" by Second City, as well as the credited vocalist in the UK top-10 single "More Than Friends" by James Hype. She has also performed backing vocals for Adele and Leona Lewis among others.

On 23 February 2018, she released her debut solo single "Do You Wanna Be Loved Like This?", through her own record label Music Core Limited.

On 19 September 2025, Kelli-Leigh released her debut album “LEGACY” featuring many of her recent single releases and 3 brand new tracks “Legacy”, “Pulse”, “Love Myself” and her most recent single “Elevate”.

In 2011, Kelli-Leigh joined Adele's touring band as a backup singer. That year, she sang lead vocals on hit single Cry (Just a Little) by Bingo Players.

Kelli-Leigh was nominated, with Aluna Francis, for a Grammy for writing contributions to "Forget About Me" on Diplo's 2022 self-titled album.

== Discography ==
=== Albums ===
- LEGACY (2025)

=== Extended plays ===
Year	Title
2012	I Am Here
2020	Can't Get Enough
2022	Unwrap My Heart

=== Singles ===
==== As a solo artist ====
Year	Title
2018	"Do You Wanna Be Loved Like This?"
2019	"Without You"
2020	"Be Alright"
2020	"Can't Get Enough"
2020	"Whiskey Midnight"
2020	"Just for One Day"
2020	"Cotton Clouds"
2021	"You Don't Know Me"
2022	"New Chic"
2024	"Unconditional"
2024	"Favourite Things"

==== As a featured artist ====
Year	Title	Main Artist(s)	UK	UK Dance	AUS	BEL (FLA)	BEL (WAL)	IRE	NED	SCO	US Dance	Certifications
2011	"Cry (Just a Little)"	Bingo Players	44	7	—	28	—	—	7	41	—	
2014	"I Got U"	Duke Dumont featuring Jax Jones	1	1	17	14	32	1	47	2	1	ARIA: Gold; BPI: Platinum; FIMI: Platinum
2014	"I Wanna Feel"	Secondcity	1	1	—	9	51	25	—	2	2	BPI: Gold
2014	"Love Too Deep"	Ferreck Dawn and Redondo	48	14	—	65	69	—	—	51	—	
2015	"Holding You"	Rossi Sure	—	—	—	—	—	—	—	—	—	
2016	"Runnin'"	Low Steppa	—	—	—	—	—	—	—	—	—	BPI: Silver
2017	"More than Friends"	James Hype	8	1	—	20	83	20	—	4	—	BPI: Platinum; BEA: Gold; BVMI: Gold
2017	"Never Be"	Tim Mason & Capa	—	—	—	—	—	—	—	—	—	
2018	"Don't Wreck My Holiday"	Black Saint	—	—	—	—	—	—	—	—	—	
2018	"Touch Me"	Malifoo & Santti	—	—	—	—	—	—	—	—	—	
2019	"Chase The Sun"	Hardwell and Dannic	—	—	—	—	—	—	—	—	—	
2019	"Feels So Good"	Tiësto and Justin Caruso	—	—	—	—	—	—	—	—	—	
2020	"The Remedy"	T.Williams and James Jacob	—	—	—	—	—	—	—	—	—	
2020	"On Repeat"	Mike Mago	—	—	—	23	—	—	—	—	—	
2020	"What They Call Love"	Ferdinand Weber	—	—	—	—	—	—	—	—	—	
2020	"No More Chances"	Wilson and ManyFew	—	—	—	—	—	—	—	—	—	
2020	"The Reason"	Halogen	—	—	—	—	—	—	—	—	—	
2021	"Good"	MistaJam	—	—	—	—	—	—	—	—	—	
2021	"On Top Of Mine"	Firebeatz	—	—	—	—	—	—	—	—	—	
2023	Calling For A Sign	Sub Focus	—	—	—	—	—	—	—	—	—	
2023	Waiting	Sub Focus and Pola & Bryson	—	—	—	—	—	—	—	—	—	
2023	Real Love	Jess Bays	—	—	—	—	—	—	—	—	—	
2024	This Moment	Wilkinson	—	—	—	—	—	—	—	—	—	
2026	Remember Me	HYPESOCIETY	—	—	—	—	—	—	—	—	—	
"—" denotes a recording that did not chart or was not released in that territory.
