= Get Up (Rattle) =

Single by Bingo Players featuring Far East Movement

from the album Dirty Bass (deluxe edition)
- Released: 11 December 2012
- Recorded: November 2012 (vocals only)
- Genre: Electro house; hip house
- Length: 2:47
- Label: Hysteria; Spinnin'; Ministry of Sound
- Songwriters: Paul Bäumer; Maarten Hoogstraten; Kev Nish; Prohgress; J-Splif; DJ Virman; Koen Groeneveld; Addy van der Zwan; Hugo Langras; Dipesh Parmar
- Producers: Paul Bäumer; Maarten Hoogstraten

Bingo Players singles chronology
"Out of My Mind" (2012)	"Get Up (Rattle)" (2012)	"Buzzcut" (2013)

Far East Movement singles chronology
"Change Your Life" (2012)	"Get Up (Rattle)" (2012)	"The Illest" (2013)

"Get Up (Rattle)" is a song by Dutch house DJ and production duo Bingo Players, featuring vocals from American hip hop group Far East Movement and additional vocals by Klubbheads (Hugo Langras, Koen Groeneveld and Addy van der Zwan). It is a revamped and vocal mix version of the Bingo Player's own 2011 song "Rattle".

"Get Up (Rattle)" was released in the Netherlands on 11 December 2012 and released in the United Kingdom on 20 January 2013. It peaked at number 24 on the Dutch Top 40 and number 19 on the Single Top 100. It was also a commercial success outside the Netherlands. In the United Kingdom, the single entered at the top of the UK Singles Chart, where it remained for two weeks and became both acts' first chart-topping hit in Britain. Elsewhere, "Get Up (Rattle)" peaked within the top ten of the charts in Australia, Denmark, France, the Republic of Ireland and South Korea.

== Music video ==
=== Background ===
A music video to accompany the release of "Get Up (Rattle)" was first released onto YouTube on December 2, 2012, at a total length of two minutes and 59 seconds. The initial video treatment was written by Bingo Players manager, Toby Benson of Complete Control Management. The video was directed by Tim Hope.

=== Synopsis ===
The video was set in the outer city of London, United Kingdom which shows a gang of youths on a run-down estate being set upon by a group of plucky ducks after taking their criminal ways a step too far. A bitter war breaks out between the two sides before the gang move on to mug an old lady who often feeds the ducks. They then toss her bag into the pond before exchanging angry words with one duck, before tossing a stone and killing a duckling. The ducks then seek their revenge and work out a plan to take out the members of the gang. They are seen walking around the estate late at night and one by one they subject each of the youths to a painful death. One boy is seen getting his face pecked off, another is grabbed in the crotch and another is lured out into the road after a duck steals his Blackberry, only to be mown down by a speeding car driven by a second duck, and the last man dies when a duck goes straight through him.

In the uncensored version, the death of the duckling is shown in more detail, the boy who gets his face pecked off has blood splatter on his face and the pecking is much more explicit, the death of the boy who gets run over is shown more graphically, and when the duck goes through the man at the end, the duck is shown with the man's still-beating heart in its beak.

== Critical reception ==
Lewis Corner of Digital Spy gave the song a positive review stating:

While the pounding beat and fizzing synths remain largely untouched on the renamed 'Get Up (Rattle)' [...] they trill with the same old party-til-dawn manifesto, attacking the addictive riffs as brutally as the killer ducks in the accompanying music video. The result is a hasty reminder that change isn't always for the better..

== Track listing ==
Digital download
No.	Title	Length
1.	"Get Up (Rattle)"	2:47
2.	"Get Up (Rattle)" (Vocal Extended)	5:01

UK Digital download
No.	Title	Length
1.	"Get Up (Rattle)" (Radio Edit)	2:47
2.	"Get Up (Rattle)" (Extended Mix)	5:01
3.	"Get Up (Rattle)" (Danny Howard Vocal Mix)	6:02
4.	"Get Up (Rattle)" (The Prototypes Remix)	4:35
5.	"Get Up (Rattle)" (Cyantific's Ghost Train Remix)	4:37
6.	"Get Up (Rattle)" (Luminox Vocal Mix)	3:53
7.	"Rattle"	4:47

Digital download - Dyro's Instrumental Remix
No.	Title	Length
1.	"Get Up (Rattle)" (Dyro's Instrumental Remix)	5:30

== Chart performance ==
(For distinct chart positions of "Rattle", refer to that page)

=== Weekly charts ===
Chart (2012–2013)	Peak position
Australia (ARIA)	4
Austria (Ö3 Austria Top 40)	16
Belgium (Ultratop 50 Flanders)	10
Belgium (Ultratop 50 Wallonia)	4
Canada (Canadian Hot 100)	51
Czech Republic Airplay (ČNS IFPI)	10
Denmark (Tracklisten)	6
Euro Digital Song Sales (Billboard)	2
Germany (GfK)	22
Finland (Suomen virallinen lista)	11
France (SNEP)	8
Hungary (Dance Top 40)	1
Ireland (IRMA)	5
Italy (Musica e dischi)	36
Luxembourg Digital Songs (Billboard)	6
Netherlands (Dutch Top 40)	20
Netherlands (Single Top 100)	19
New Zealand (Recorded Music NZ)	25
Poland Dance (ZPAV)	7
Russia Airplay (TopHit)	10
Scottish Singles Sales (Official Charts)	1
Slovakia Airplay (ČNS IFPI)	34
South Korea (Gaon International Singles)	6
Sweden (Sverigetopplistan)	37
Switzerland (Schweizer Hitparade)	24
UK Radio Airplay (Nielsen Soundscan)	18
UK Singles (Official Charts)	1
UK TV Airplay (Nielsen Soundscan)	1
UK Dance (Official Charts)	1
UK Indie (Official Charts)	1
US Dance Club Songs (Billboard)	5
US Hot Dance/Electronic Songs (Billboard)	15
US Rhythmic Airplay (Billboard)	34

=== Year-end charts ===
Chart (2013)	Position
Australia (ARIA)	63
Belgium (Ultratop Flanders)	62
Belgium (Ultratop Wallonia)	34
France (SNEP)	36
Hungary (Dance Top 40)	21
Netherlands (Dutch Top 40)	122
Russia Airplay (TopHit)	52
Sweden (Sverigetopplistan)	90
UK Singles (Official Charts Company)	69
US Hot Dance/Electronic Songs (Billboard)	47

== Certifications ==
Region	Certification	Certified units/sales
Australia (ARIA)	2× Platinum	140,000^{^}
Canada (Music Canada)	Gold	40,000^{*}
Germany (BVMI)	Gold	150,000^{‡}
Italy (FIMI)	Gold	15,000^{*}
New Zealand (RMNZ)	Gold	15,000^{‡}
Sweden (GLF)	Gold	20,000^{‡}
United Kingdom (BPI)	Platinum	600,000^{‡}
Streaming
Denmark (IFPI Danmark)	Gold	900,000^{†}
^{*} Sales figures based on certification alone.^{^} Shipments figures based on certification alone.^{‡} Sales+streaming figures based on certification alone.^{†} Streaming-only figures based on certification alone.

== Release history ==
Region	Date	Format	Label
Netherlands	11 December 2012	Digital download	Hysteria, Spinnin' Records, Ministry of Sound
United Kingdom	20 January 2013	Digital download	Hysteria, Spinnin' Records, Ministry of Sound
