= Treasure (song) =

2013 single by Bruno Mars

Single by Bruno Mars

from the album Unorthodox Jukebox
- B-side: "Locked Out of Heaven" (Paul Oakenfold Remix)
- Released: May 10, 2013
- Studio: Levcon (Los Angeles, California)
- Genre: Disco; funk-pop; soul; synth-pop
- Length: 2:58
- Label: Atlantic
- Songwriters: Bruno Mars; Philip Lawrence; Ari Levine; Phredley Brown; Thibaut Berland; Christopher Khan
- Producer: The Smeezingtons

Bruno Mars singles chronology
"When I Was Your Man" (2013)	"Treasure" (2013)	"Bubble Butt" (2013)

Music video
- "Treasure" on YouTube

"Treasure" is a song by American singer and songwriter Bruno Mars from his second studio album, Unorthodox Jukebox (2012). It was written by Mars, Philip Lawrence, Ari Levine, and Phredley Brown, while production was handled by Mars, Lawrence and Levine under the name of the Smeezingtons. Due to the similarities with Breakbot's "Baby I'm Yours", new writing credits were added. The song was selected as the third single by Atlantic Records and was first issued to airplay in Italy on May 10, 2013.

The single became Mars's seventh top ten hit in the United States since his career as an artist began in 2010. It has also reached the top-ten in countries like Australia, Canada, France, Israel, and New Zealand. It reached the top of the charts in Libya, Mexico, and South Africa. "Treasure" received media attention for its funk and disco vibe, which few artists have brought back, comparing it to Michael Jackson's music.

The single was certified five-times platinum by the Recording Industry Association of America (RIAA), eight times platinum by Music Canada (MC) and four times platinum by Recorded Music New Zealand (RMNZ). The accompanying music video for the song was shot by Cameron Duddy and Mars in Las Vegas, Hollywood and premiered on June 14, 2013. The video presents Mars's band, The Hooligans, in a live performance. "Treasure" was performed on all his tours since its release. It was also used at his Super Bowl XLVIII halftime show set list.

== Background and production ==
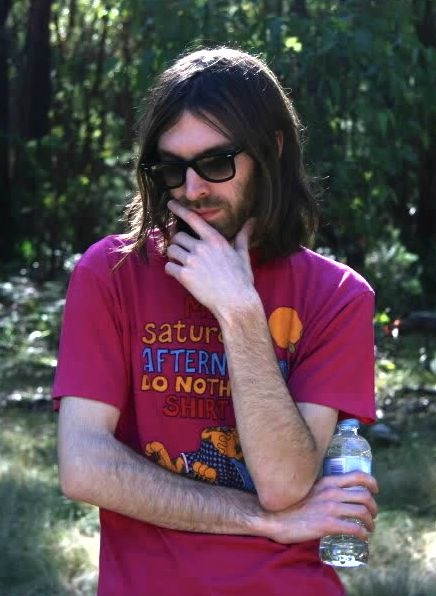
Breakbot inspired the song and was later credited as a writer.

In an interview with Rob LeDonne, Philip Lawrence explained the inspiration for the song: "Well, the thing we learned after touring with Doo-Wops was how it is we like to feel on stage when performing. We're fun, like to dance and party, and we didn't really get to do a lot of that on the first album. Even going to festivals and seeing big bands live, like Coldplay or Bruce Springsteen, we knew the second time around we wanted something fun. It's the kind of song where the whole band can get up and jam and have this Earth, Wind and Fire kind of moment."

"Treasure" is one of the eleven songs composed and produced by the Smeezingtons for Bruno Mars's second studio album, Unorthodox Jukebox, with additional songwriting by Phredley Brown. It was mixed at Larrabee Sound Studios in Hollywood by Manny Marroquin. Ari Levine recorded the track at Levcon Studios in California. Charles Moniz served as the song's additional engineer. It was mastered by David Kutch at The Mastering Place.

In December 2012, French electronic artist Breakbot tweeted Mars regarding the similarity to "Treasure" and his song "Baby I'm Yours" (2010). In May 2013, during an interview, Breakbot explained that the boss of Because Music had mentioned, a year previously, that Mars wanted to cover "Baby I'm Yours". As Breakbot was busy finishing the album, "it did not happen." Breakbot called "Treasure" a "rip-off" of his song; however, he was "cool with it"; he explained that he also had many influences on his music "with lots of bits taken from here and there". The song was re-registered with new writing credits, which included Thibaut Berland and Christopher Khan.

== Composition and release ==
"Treasure"
An 18-second sample of "Treasure", where Mars sings about treating the girl he loves like a treasure.

"Treasure" is composed in the key of E♭ major with a tempo of 112 beats per minute. The chord progression of A♭M_{7}–(Gm_{7})–Fm_{7}–Gm_{7}–Cm–(B♭) repeats throughout the song, changing only to end phrases on B♭_{9sus} (A♭/B♭), a deceptive cadence. Mars's vocals range from the low note of B♭_{3} to the high note of E♭_{5}. Its composition features punch bass lines, "high synthesizer chimes", call-and-response structure on the backing vocals and "the fill at the end of the chorus" is inspired by "a roller disco". All the vocals on the track are taken from a "playbook of a '70s pop Lothario". It's has been dubbed as a "roller-rink-ready slice of pop-funk with heart-eyed lyrics". It also includes a "clap-along breakdown and a giddy chorus".

"Treasure" is a disco, soul, funk-pop and synth-pop track, heavily influenced by R&B. Caroline Sullivan of The Guardian called it a "sprightly disco thumper". Josep R. Atilano of Philippine Daily Inquirer wrote that Mars was "acknowledging artists synonymous with the 80s in the likes of The Police, New Edition, Billy Joel, Earth, Wind And Fire, and Michael Jackson". Melissa Maerz of Entertainment Weekly remarked that the song "makes silk-jumpsuit disco feel contemporary", Andy Gill of The Independent wrote that Mars "demonstrates a keen appreciation of Patrice Rushen's funk-pop". In a Slate article, critic Ann Powers said that the song "was a direct homage to the sound and even the look of 'P.Y.T.'-era Michael Jackson". Tris McCal writing for NJ.com noticed the similarities between "Treasure" and the sound of Michael Jackson's Off the Wall (1979).

In the April 18, 2013 issue of Billboard Top 40 Mid-Week Update, it was reported that Atlantic Records had selected "Treasure" as the third single from Unorthodox Jukebox. "Treasure" was sent for radio airplay in Italy on May 10, 2013, by Warner Music Group. On May 29 of the same year, BBC Radio 1 began adding the song onto their playlists. On June 21, 2013, a CD single was released in Germany, Austria and Switzerland through Atlantic Records. A remix EP with five remixes of the song was released on August 13, 2013 for digital download by the former label.

== Reception ==
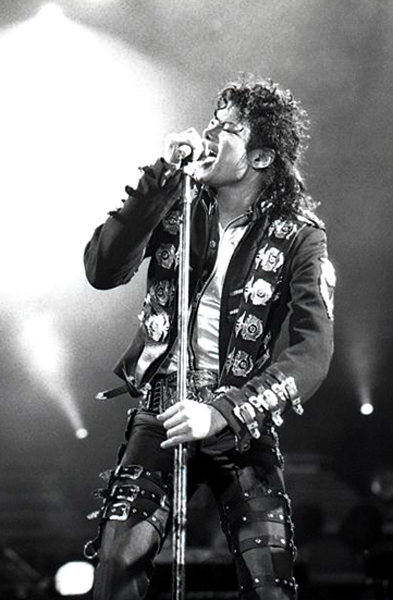
Various critics compared "Treasure" to Michael Jackson's music.

=== Critical reception ===
"Treasure" was well-received by music critics. Jason Lipshutz of Billboard wrote that one "gets the feeling that 'Treasure', with its grand harmonies, classically kooky hooks and slyly sexual undertones, is the musical mode that makes Mars the happiest", while Spin's Dan Hyman favorably compared "Treasure" to the work of American disco artist Donna Summer. Journalist Robert Copsey of Digital Spy gave the song a rating of 4 out of 5, and noted that it "sounds like a modern-day 'Rock with You', a feat that few could get away with pulling off so authentically". Ryan Reed of Paste gave the song a positive review, and described "Treasure" as a "stripper-theme funk-pop with gooey synth pads and enormous slap-bass fills that punch through like air-humps". Rolling Stone's Jody Rosen commented that "Treasure" is "creamy Michael Jackson/Prince-schooled disco soul", while Matt Cibula from PopMatters also compared the "funky" song to the work of those two musicians when he said that "Treasure" "knows that a flirt beats a bleat any day". Matthew Horton from BBC Music wrote that the track has a "sugary early 80s funk", and that it "is lathered in so much slap bass it starts to sting". Evan Rytlewski of The A.V. Club wrote that for this "disco-spiked" song, Mars "capably sells himself as a one-man Maroon 5". Tim Sendra of AllMusic found that the song had an "easy-going charm" of the previous album, and described it as "MJ-inspired disco jam".

In a mixed review for The Scotsman, Fiona Shepherd wrote that "Treasure" is "likeable pop funk". The song made the cut of HitFix's songs of the summer of 2013, which was filled with a funk retro vibe, with Katie Hasty saying that "it looks like it was culled straight out of Soul Train." On the "Billboard 20 Best Songs of 2013: Critics' Picks" list, the single was placed at number 20, writing, "Bruno Mars' throwback single ... made more than a few fans smile this year."

=== Accolades ===
In 2014, "Treasure" received a 2014 NAACP Image Awards nomination for Outstanding Song. In the same year, the song was one of the winners of Most Performed Songs at the ASCAP Pop Music Awards. The song was nominated for Choice Music: Love Song and Choice Music: Summer Song at the 2013 Teen Choice Awards and for the 2013 NRJ Music Awards in the International Song of the Year category. According to Rdio's, an online music service, the song was the sixth most streamed track worldwide; it was also eighth in the US.

== Commercial performance ==
=== North America ===
The Billboard Top 40 Mid-Week Update of April 18, 2013, reported that "Treasure" was the album's third single, with no official date of release in the United States. Nevertheless, "Treasure" entered the US Billboard Hot 100 chart at number 71 on June 1, 2013. In the following week, it entered the top 40 after the first full week of sales and Mars's performance of the song in the opening of the 2013 Billboard Music Awards. In the week of July 6, 2013, the song entered the top 10 of Billboard Hot 100 at number eight. Treasure" eventually peaked at number five on Billboard Hot 100. It was certified five times platinum by the Recording Industry Association of America (RIAA). As of November 2013, the song had sold two million copies in the US indicating inclusion of on-demand audio and/or video song streams in addition to downloads.

In the week of July 11, 2013, the song entered the top 10 of radio and extended Mars's streak on Radio Songs. All of his 11 first entries reached the top 10 of the chart, tying with T-Pain among males and within one of tying Mariah Carey for the best start among all acts. The list tracks releases since December 1990. His next single, "Gorilla", peaked at number 21, preventing him from extending the streak. "Treasure" also peaked at number five on Billboard's Pop Songs chart. It rose to number five on the Canadian Hot 100 and reached the top position on Canada AC. It was certified eight times platinum by Music Canada (MC).

=== Europe and Oceania ===
"Treasure" first appeared in the UK Singles Chart on May 26, 2013. After three weeks, it reached its peak position at number 12. It was certified double platinum by the British Phonographic Industry (BPI) for track-equivalent sales of 1,200,000 units. The single made its debut at number 51 on the Ö3 Austria Top 40 and peaked at number 15. In France, the song entered the French singles chart at number 113 and peaked at number six; it was Mars's fifth top-ten single in that country. In Ireland, it reached number nine and became Mars's ninth top-ten single. "Treasure" started at number 33 in the Ultratop 50 Wallonia and peaked at number 10 in its eighth week on the chart. In Denmark, it entered the singles chart at number 30 and climbed to number 14, making it Mars's eighth top-fifteen single in that country.

It entered the Australian ARIA Singles Chart at number 28 on May 19, 2013, and eventually reached number 10, thus becoming Mars's ninth top-ten single in Australia. "Treasure" was certified two times platinum by Australian Recording Industry Association (ARIA). In New Zealand, it first entered the singles chart at number 21 on May 27, 2013, and rose to number seven. In 2026, it was certified four times platinum by the Recorded Music New Zealand (RMNZ).

== Music video ==
=== Development and synopsis ===
Mars filmed the music video for "Treasure" with Taja Riley, a model and dancer, in Las Vegas on May 20, 2013, the day after the live performance of the song at the 2013 Billboard Music Awards. It was directed by Cameron Duddy and Mars, who also directed the videos for the last two singles of the album, "Locked Out of Heaven" (2012) and "When I Was Your Man" (2013). The video was released on June 14, 2013, by Mars on his official Twitter account and was the third of Mars series to feature simple effects from the late 1970s and early 1980s music videos.

Mars and The Hooligans perform the song along with a simple synchronized choreography in matching red suits, leopard print shirts and gold chains. The set features a disco ball, vintage stage lights, the set up of the instruments in the background and other elements present in the disco era. The style of the music video greatly resembles the performance held at the 2013 Billboard Music Awards. Following the 1970s theme, the video is unavailable in high definition, and is rather shown in standard-definition quality and with a 4:3 aspect ratio. For EW, Kyle Anderson, pointed out "It's all there: The suits, the setting, and the bong-water video effects," while Melinda Newman for HitFix noticed that "to complete the look, the video features special effects, including crude back lighting, wacky dissolves, geometric shapes, and a Star Wars-like background." All of these and the videotape wear were also added to the footage to bring a retro-feel to it.

=== Reception ===
Kyle Anderson from Entertainment Weekly wrote "We should probably just change the name of this year from '2013' to '1978', because there are more sparkly suits and disco guitars than we know what to do with" and that "Bruno Mars has gone full-on Betamax for his new video for the track 'Treasure'. It's all there: the suits, the setting, and the bong-water video effects." Jordan Sargent of Spin said that Mars wasn't trying to hide the Michael Jackson influence on the video, writing "new low-def makes obvious – compare it next to, say, the video for 'Rock with You'." Similarly, Robbie Daw, from the Idolator website, drew attention to the fact that the song and dance had already been seen during the performance on Billboard Music Awards in May, since "Mars and his band seem to have recreated that very same performance for this clip." He also wrote that the video was "still a fun three minutes to sit through", mainly because "Bruno mimics MJ's 'Rock With You' moves so deftly." According to Joseph Atilano of the Philippine Daily Inquirer, "the music video is tricked out with set pieces such as a disco ball and vintage stage lights. Even the manner by which the instruments were set up in the background show the attention given to even the minutest of details and the small things do matter when it comes to making a music video."

Mars, who choreographed the video, won the award for Best Choreography during the 2013 MTV Video Music Awards. It was also nominated in the Best Dance Performance category for the 2013 Soul Train Music Awards. The video for the song was nominated for Outstanding Music Video at the 2014 NAACP Image Awards.

=== Interactive music video ===
After the release of his music video, Mars and his label created a website that integrated fan footage shot using Instagram's video function with the official video. This was the first project to be created using Instagram's video functionality, launched in June 2013.

When fans visited TreasureDance.com, they saw an old-fashioned-looking TV with a pair of knobs. After pressing play, the official video began to play, interspersed with fan footage that had been hashtagged with #treasuredance. Users could skip footage by clicking on the television knobs; they could also click on Instagram usernames to see those dancers' accounts. Jules LaPlace, the Chief Technology Officer of OKFocus, who produced the website, and Ryder Ripps, the company's creative director, said that the song's "tempo, temperament and general vibe" made it perfect for the project.

== Live performances ==
Mars has performed the song at several shows. On January 11, 2013, Mars sang "Treasure" and his previous single "Locked Out of Heaven" on Jimmy Kimmel Live. On May 19, Mars began the 2013 Billboard Music Awards with a performance of the single on a set decorated with disco balls. The website Idolator described his style during the performance as "Michael Jackson-esque, circa Off The Wall and Thriller". Billboard considered the performance one of the best ten of the night. Later, in 2018, Billboard ranked the performance as the seventh best of all time, Shanté Honeycutt called the bridge dance break "iconic." She added "[it] rocked the house and turned into a party as confetti fell from the ceiling." Mars sang "Treasure" at the finale of Germany's Next Topmodel, Cycle 8 on May 30, 2013, at SAP Arena in Mannheim and again a week later on Le Grand Journal. He performed the song with The Hooligans on the season finale of Season 4 of The Voice on June 18, 2013. On February 2, 2014, the single was featured as the fourth song in Mars's performance in the halftime performance of Super Bowl XLVIII at the MetLife Stadium in New Jersey.

Mars performed the song live at the 2014 Brit Awards ceremony. Ashley Lee, a writer for The Hollywood Reporter, noticed that Mars "added few well-harmonized vocal interludes to the song bridge, while reprising the song's vintage-style choreography". The single was also sung during The Moonshine Jungle Tour (2013–14) and on his debut concert residency, Bruno Mars at The Chelsea, Las Vegas (2013–15). The song was performed as a medley of "That's What I Like" of Mars's third studio album 24K Magic (2016), at the 2017 iHeartRadio Music Awards. Mars performed the single at the Apollo Theater alongside the majority of the 24K Magic album for his CBS prime time special titled Bruno Mars: 24K Magic Live at the Apollo, which aired on November 29, 2017. "Treasure" was also sung during the 24K Magic World Tour (2017–18) and it was part of the set list of An Evening with Silk Sonic at Park MGM (2022), a concert residency performed by Mars with Anderson .Paak, as Silk Sonic. Mars also performed the song during his Bruno Mars Live (2022–2024) shows as a mashup with "Liquor Store Blues" (2010).

== Cover versions and usage in media ==
Max Schneider and Megan Nicole, two American singer-songwriters, covered the song together. The song was available for purchase on July 30, 2013. It was also covered by Sabrina, a Filipina singer; her acoustic version, which featured King Pichet, was included on her Love Acoustic 6 album, released on January 1, 2013. In 2015, Olly Murs performed the song along with his own song "Wrapped Up" as the closing song of his Never Been Better Tour concerts. In 2015, the song was used in a Nissan commercial. On February 9, 2016, the song was released as a DLC for the video game Rock Band 4. The song is part of the track list of Just Dance 2024 Edition.

== Formats and track listing ==
- CD single
1. "Treasure" – 2:56
2. "Locked Out of Heaven" (Paul Oakenfold Remix) – 5:17
- Digital download – Remix EP
1. "Treasure (Sharam radio remix)" – 3:41
2. "Treasure (Audien radio edit)" – 3:52
3. "Treasure (Cash Cash radio mix)" – 3:28
4. "Treasure (Robert DeLong radio edit)" – 2:58
5. "Treasure (Bailey Smalls radio edit)" – 3:32

== Personnel ==
Credits adapted from the liner notes of Unorthodox Jukebox and Billboard.

- Bruno Mars – lead vocals, songwriting
- Philip Lawrence – songwriting
- Ari Levine – songwriting, recording
- The Smeezingtons – production
- Phredley Brown – songwriting
- Thibaut Berland – songwriting
- Christopher Khan – songwriting
- Charles Moniz – additional engineer
- Manny Marroquin – mixing
- David Kutch – mastering

== Charts ==
=== Weekly charts ===
List of chart positions
Chart (2013–2014)	Peak position
Australia (ARIA)	10
Austria (Ö3 Austria Top 40)	15
Belgium (Ultratop 50 Flanders)	26
Belgium (Ultratop 50 Wallonia)	10
Canada Hot 100 (Billboard)	4
Canada AC (Billboard)	1
Canada CHR/Top 40 (Billboard)	5
Canada Hot AC (Billboard)	4
Czech Republic Airplay (ČNS IFPI)	22
Denmark (Tracklisten)	14
Euro Digital Song Sales (Billboard)	8
France (SNEP)	6
Germany (GfK)	17
Hungary (Dance Top 40)	6
Hungary (Rádiós Top 40)	4
Hungary (Single Top 40)	15
Ireland (IRMA)	9
Israel International Airplay (Media Forest)	2
Italy (FIMI)	22
Lebanon Airplay (Lebanese Top 20)	1
Mexico (Billboard Mexican Airplay)	2
Mexico Anglo (Monitor Latino)	1
Netherlands (Dutch Top 40)	11
Netherlands (Single Top 100)	15
New Zealand (Recorded Music NZ)	7
Poland Dance (ZPAV)	23
Scottish Singles Sales (Official Charts)	14
Slovakia Airplay (ČNS IFPI)	39
Slovenia (SloTop50)	6
South Africa Airplay (EMA)	1
South Korea International (Gaon)	6
Spain (Promusicae)	26
Switzerland (Schweizer Hitparade)	13
UK Singles (Official Charts)	12
US Billboard Hot 100	5
US Adult Contemporary (Billboard)	11
US Adult Pop Airplay (Billboard)	6
US Dance Club Songs (Billboard)	14
US Dance Airplay (Billboard)	16
US Latin Airplay (Billboard)	29
US Pop Airplay (Billboard)	5
US Rhythmic Airplay (Billboard)	2
Venezuela Pop/Rock General (Record Report)	2

List of chart position
Chart (2017)	Peak position
Japan Hot 100 (Billboard)	63

List of chart positions
Chart (2023)	Peak position
Israel (Mako Hitlist)	53
South Korea (Circle)	144

List of chart positions
Chart (2024)	Peak position
Global 200 (Billboard)	193
Singapore (RIAS)	22
Philippines (Philippines Hot 100)	47

=== Year-end charts ===
List of chart positions
Chart (2013)	Position
Australia (ARIA)	80
Belgium (Ultratop Flanders)	73
Belgium (Ultratop Wallonia)	60
Brazil Airplay (Crowley)	94
Canada (Canadian Hot 100)	34
France (SNEP)	26
Germany (Media Control AG)	84
Hungary (Dance Top 40)	32
Hungary (Rádiós Top 40)	37
Israel International Airplay (Media Forest)	17
Italy (FIMI)	64
Netherlands (Dutch Top 40)	44
Netherlands (Single Top 100)	57
New Zealand (Recorded Music NZ)	44
Slovenia Airplay (SloTop50)	26
Switzerland (Schweizer Hitparade)	70
US Billboard Hot 100	30
US Adult Contemporary (Billboard)	23
US Adult Top 40 (Billboard)	27
US Mainstream Top 40 (Billboard)	31
US Rhythmic (Billboard)	18

List of chart positions
Chart (2014)	Position
Brazil Airplay (Crowley)	79
France (SNEP)	148
Hungary (Dance Top 40)	19
Hungary (Rádiós Top 40)	94

List of chart position
Chart (2015)	Position
Hungary (Dance Top 40)	83

List of chart position
Chart (2025)	Position
Argentina Anglo Airplay (Monitor Latino)	93

== Certifications ==
List of certifications
Region	Certification	Certified units/sales
Australia (ARIA)	2× Platinum	140,000^{^}
Belgium (BRMA)	Gold	15,000^{*}
Canada (Music Canada)	8× Platinum	640,000^{‡}
Denmark (IFPI Danmark)	2× Platinum	180,000^{‡}
France (SNEP)	Gold	75,000^{*}
Germany (BVMI)	Gold	150,000^{^}
Italy (FIMI)	Platinum	30,000^{‡}
Mexico (AMPROFON)	2× Platinum	120,000^{*}
New Zealand (RMNZ)	4× Platinum	120,000^{‡}
Spain (Promusicae)	Platinum	60,000^{‡}
Sweden (GLF)	Gold	20,000^{‡}
Switzerland (IFPI Switzerland)	Gold	15,000^{^}
United Kingdom (BPI)	2× Platinum	1,200,000^{‡}
United States (RIAA)	5× Platinum	5,000,000^{‡}
Streaming
Denmark (IFPI Danmark)	Platinum	2,600,000^{†}
Japan (RIAJ)	Gold	50,000,000^{†}
Spain (Promusicae)	Gold	4,000,000^{†}
^{*} Sales figures based on certification alone.^{^} Shipments figures based on certification alone.^{‡} Sales+streaming figures based on certification alone.^{†} Streaming-only figures based on certification alone.

== Release history ==
List of release history, showing region(s), date(s), format(s) and label(s)
Region	Date	Format	Label	Ref.
Italy	May 10, 2013	Radio airplay	Warner Music Group	
Germany	June 21, 2013	CD single	Atlantic	
United States	August 13, 2013	Digital download (remixes)	Atlantic	

== See also ==
- List of Billboard Hot 100 top 10 singles in 2013
