= Bingo Players =

Dutch electronic music act

- Origin: Netherlands
- Genres: Electro house, progressive house, EDM
- Years active: 2006-present
- Labels: Hysteria, Spinnin'
- Members: Maarten Hoogstraten
- Past members: Paul Bäumer
- Website: bingoplayersmusic.com

Bingo Players is a Dutch dance and electro house musical project fronted by DJ and record producer Maarten Hoogstraten (Dutch pronunciation: [ˈmaːrtə(n) ˈɦoːxstraːtə(n)]). Bingo Players was originally a duo, which included Paul Bäumer, who died from cancer in 2013. After the death of Bäumer, Hoogstraten announced that Bäumer had wished for him to continue under the Bingo Players name. They are best known for their songs "Cry (Just a Little)" and "Rattle". "Cry (Just a Little)" was a top-40 hit in the Netherlands, Belgium, United Kingdom and other parts of Europe and Australia. Bingo Players were ranked number 52 in DJ Mag's Top 100 DJs list for 2013.

== Biography ==
The Bingo Players was founded by Dutch DJs Maarten Hoogstraten and Paul Bäumer, in 2006.

In addition to DJing and producing, Bingo Players own and operate Hysteria Records. The label releases many of the Bingo Players' singles in addition to tracks from other electro house producers.

In May 2011, the Bingo Players released "Cry (Just a Little)". In the same year, the Bingo Players had a hit with their original record "Rattle". The song charted in the top 40 in the Netherlands, France, Sweden and Denmark.

In 2013, a revamped version of "Rattle" titled "Get Up (Rattle)" was released and became a number one single in the United Kingdom in addition to being a top 10 hit in Germany, Austria, France, Australia and other parts of Europe. The single has been certified gold in Canada, silver in the UK, and four times platinum in Australia.

On 19 July 2013, Bäumer announced on the duo's Facebook page that he was diagnosed with cancer and that Hoogstraten would be representing the duo on the road for the remaining tour. Bäumer stated he would still be working in the studio as well as taking lead in running Hysteria Records, while seeking medical treatment.

On 17 December 2013, Bäumer died after having cancer for over a year. Hoogstraten announced the news on Facebook on December 18. He had cancelled all upcoming shows to take time off to mourn the loss with his family and friends as well as attending the funeral.

In early 2014, Bingo Players announced that Hoogstraten would be continuing on as a solo act, as per Bäumer's wishes. Around the same time, the Bingo Players released "Knock You Out", which became the group's first number one song on the US dance chart.

The Bingo Players appeared at #96 on the DJ Mag Top 100 DJs for 2014.

== Discography ==
=== Extended plays ===
List of extended plays, with selected details
Title	Details
What's Next	Released: 4 December 2017; Label: Hysteria Records; Format: Digital download

=== Singles ===
List of charting singles as lead artist, with selected chart positions and certifications, showing year released and album name
Title	Year	Peak chart positions									Certifications
Title	Year	NLD	AUS	AUT	BEL	DEN	FRA	SWE	NZ	UK	Certifications
"Gimme All That You Got"	2006	—	—	—	—	—	—	—	—	—	
"Sonic Stomp"	2006	—	—	—	—	—	—	—	—	—	
"Shake It"	2007	—	—	—	—	—	—	—	—	—	
"Chuck Full of Funk"	2007	—	—	—	—	—	—	—	—	—	
"Party People"	2007	—	—	—	—	—	—	—	—	—	
"Touch Me" (vs. Chocolate Puma)	2008	73	—	—	—	—	—	—	—	—	
"Get Up"	2008	—	—	—	—	—	—	—	—	—	
"Bounce (Till Ya)"	2008	—	—	—	—	—	—	—	—	—	
"Blurr"	2008	—	—	—	—	—	—	—	—	—	
"Chop"	2008	78	—	—	—	—	—	—	—	—	
"I Will Follow (Theme Fit for Free Dance Parade 2009)" (feat. Dan'thony)	2009	82	—	—	—	—	—	—	—	—	
"Devotion"	2009	—	—	—	26	—	—	—	—	—	
"Disco Electrique" (vs. Chocolate Puma)	2009	—	—	—	—	—	—	—	—	—	
"Tom's Diner"	2010	—	—	—	75	—	—	—	—	—	
"When I Dip"	2010	—	—	—	—	—	—	—	—	—	
"Get on the Move"	2010	—	—	—	—	—	—	—	—	—	
"Obviously" (with Carl Tricks)	2010	—	—	—	—	—	—	—	—	—	
"Lame Brained"	2010	—	—	—	—	—	—	—	—	—	
"Cry (Just a Little)"	2011	7	—	—	28	—	—	—	—	44	NVPI: Gold
"Sliced" (vs. Nicky Romero)	2011	—	—	—	—	—	—	—	—	—	
"Rattle"	2011	91	—	46	—	35	140	42	—	—	NVPI: Gold; GLF: Platinum; IFPI DEN: Platinum
"Mode"	2011	—	—	—	—	—	—	—	—	—	
"Don't Blame the Party (Mode)" (feat. Heather Bright)	2012	55	—	—	104	—	—	—	—	—	
"L'Amour"	2012	—	—	—	—	—	—	—	—	—	
"Out of My Mind"	2012	—	—	—	62	—	—	—	—	—	
"Get Up (Rattle)" (feat. Far East Movement)	2012	19	4	16	10	6	8	37	25	1	ARIA: 2× Platinum; BPI: Platinum; GLF: Gold; IFPI DEN: Gold; MC: Gold
"Buzzcut"	2013	—	—	—	—	—	—	—	—	—	
"Knock You Out"	2014	70	—	—	—	—	—	—	—	—	
"Nothing to Say"	2015	—	—	—	—	—	—	—	—	—	
"Curiosity"	2015	—	—	—	—	—	—	—	—	—	
"Lone Wolf"	2016	—	—	—	—	—	—	—	—	—	
"Be with You"	2016	—	—	—	—	—	—	—	—	—	
"Bust This"	2017	—	—	—	—	—	—	—	—	—	
"No. 1 Disco"	2017	—	—	—	—	—	—	—	—	—	
"Tic Toc" (with Oomloud)	2017	—	—	—	—	—	—	—	—	—	
"Beat the Drum"	2017	—	—	—	—	—	—	—	—	—	
"Everybody" (with Goshfather)	2018	—	—	—	—	—	—	—	—	—	
"Love Me Right"	2018	—	—	—	—	—	—	—	—	—	
"Body Rock" (with Bali Bandits)	2018	—	—	—	—	—	—	—	—	—	
"1000 Years"	2019	—	—	—	—	—	—	—	—	—	
"Get Together" (with Oomloud)	2020	—	—	—	—	—	—	—	—	—	
"Brighter Days" (with Oomloud)	2020	—	—	—	—	—	—	—	—	—	
"Scoop" (with Peyruis)	2020	—	—	—	—	—	—	—	—	—	
"Shed My Skin" (with Oomloud)	2020	—	—	—	—	—	—	—	—	—	
"Forever Love" (with Disco Fries featuring Viiq)	2020	—	—	—	—	—	—	—	—	—	
"I Know This Club" (with Ida Corr)	2020	—	—	—	—	—	—	—	—	—	
"Touch & Go" (with Oomloud)	2021	—	—	—	—	—	—	—	—	—	
"Do What You Like" (with Zookëper)	2021	—	—	—	—	—	—	—	—	—	
"Holiday" (with Oomloud featuring Séb Mont)	2021	—	—	—	—	—	—	—	—	—	
"State of Mind" (featuring Sarah de Warren)	2022	—	—	—	—	—	—	—	—	—	
"Bathroom Line" (with Zookëper)	2022	—	—	—	—	—	—	—	—	—	
"Phone a Friend" (feat. Tia)	2022	—	—	—	—	—	—	—	—	—	
"Our House" (with Fatman Scoop & Disco Fries)	2024	—	—	—	—	—	—	—	—	—	
"For a Star to Fall" (with Disco Fries & Boy Meets Girl)	2025	—	—	—	—	—	—	—	—	—	
"—" denotes a recording that did not chart or was not released in that territory.

=== Remixes ===
2007

- UHM – House Ya (Bingo Players Remix)

2008

- UHM and Tony Flexx – Our House (Bingo Players Remix)
- Josh the Funky 1 – It's the Music (Bingo Players Remix)
- Ian Carey – Redlight (Bingo Players Remix)
- Erick E – Wanna Go Again (Bingo Players Remix)
- Groovenatics – Joy (Bingo Players Remix)
- Gio Martinez, Genetik – Pixel (Bingo Players Remix)
- Todd Terry – Uncle Tech (Bingo Players Remix)
- Soulcatcher feat. Amanda Wilson – Falling for You (Bingo Players Remix)

2009

- Ron Carroll – Bump to Dis (Bart B More Vs. Bingo Players Remix)
- Oliver Twizt – You're Not Alone (Bingo Players Remix)
- Harrison Crump – Gone (Bingo Players Remix)
- Kristine W – Feel What You Want (Bingo Players Feel It 2 Remix)
- Joachim Garraud – Are U Ready? (Bingo Players Remix)
- Villanord – Muzik (Bingo Players Remix)
- Ferry Corsten feat. Maria Nayer – We Belong (Bingo Players Remix)
- Sander van Doorn and Marco V – What Say? (Bingo Players Remix)
- Patric La Funk – Xylo (Bingo Players Remix)
- Sir James – Special (Bingo Players Remix)
- N.E.R.D – Lapdance (Bingo Players Bootleg Remix)
- Nick Supply feat. Tasha Baxter – That Bounce Track (Bingo Players Remix)
- Gel Abril – Spells of Yoruba (Bingo Players Remix)
- Martin Solveig – Poptimistic (Bingo Players Vox)
- Kid Cudi vs. Crookers – Day 'n' Nite (Bingo Players Remix)

2010

- Gramophonedzie – Why Don't You (Bingo Players Remix)
- Mastiksoul feat. Zoey – Taking Me Hi (Bingo Players Remix)
- Eddie Thoneick feat. Terri B. – Release (Bingo Players Remix)
- Kelis – Milkshake (Bingo Players Bootleg)
- The Black Eyed Peas – The Time (Dirty Bit) (Bingo Players Bootleg)
- David Guetta feat. Kid Cudi – Memories (Bingo Players Remix)
- Dany P-Jazz, Fedde Le Grand and Funkerman – New Life (Bingo Players Remix)
- Green Velvet – La La Land (Bingo Players Remix)

2011

- Sir Mix-a-Lot – Baby Got Back (Bingo Players Bootleg)
- Pitbull feat. Ne-Yo, Afrojack and Nayer – Give Me Everything (Bingo Players Remix)
- Sander van Doorn – Koko (Bingo Players Remix)
- The Prodigy – Everybody in the Place (Bingo Players Bootleg)
- Wally Lopez – Welcome Home (Bingo Players Remix)
- Manufactured Superstars feat. Scarlett Quinn – Take Me Over (Bingo Players Remix)
- Flo Rida – Good Feeling (Bingo Players Remix)

2012

- Far East Movement – Jello (Bingo Players Remix)
- Carl Tricks – Mad Dash (Bingo Players Edit)
- TJR vs. Foreigner - Cold as Oi (Bingo Players Mashup)
- Maurizio Gubellini vs. Macklemore - Who's in the Thriftshop (Bingo Players Mashup)
- Daft Punk - One More Time (Bingo Players Jello Bootleg)

2013

- Dada Life – Boing Clash Boom (Bingo Players Remix)
- Duck Sauce – Radio Stereo (Bingo Players Remix)

2014

- Gorgon City - Here for You (Bingo Players Remix)

2015

- Mystery Skulls - Magic (Bingo Players' French Fried Rework)
- Hardwell feat. Jason Derulo - Follow Me (Bingo Players Remix)

2016

- Bingo Players - "Tom's Diner" (Bingo Players 2016 Re-Work)

2017

- Charlie Puth - "Attention" (Bingo Players Remix)

2018

- Bingo Players and Goshfather - "Everybody" (Bingo Players Remix)
- Bingo Players - "Love Me Right" (Bingo Players x Oomloud Club Mix)

2019

- Ava Max - "Freaking Me Out" (Bingo Players Remix)
- Camille Jones - "The Creeps" (Bingo Players Remix)
- Laidback Luke featuring Majestic - "Pogo" (Bingo Players Remix)

2020

- Bingo Players, Felguk and Fafaq - "Devotion" (2020 Remix)

=== Production credits ===
- Flo Rida – "I Cry" (2012)
- Ne-Yo – "Forever Now" (2012)
- Alexis Jordan – "Acid Rain" (2013)

== See also ==
- List of artists who reached number one on the US Dance chart
