= Out of My Mind =

Out of My Mind may refer to:

== Film and television ==
- Out of My Mind (film), an American adaptation of the Sharon Draper novel (see below)
- Out of My Mind, a 1995 documentary short film by Cynthia Wade
- "Out of My Mind" (Buffy the Vampire Slayer), a 2000 TV episode

== Literature ==
- Out of My Mind (novel), a 2010 novel by Sharon Draper
- Out of My Mind, a 1943 book by Katharine Brush
- Out of My Mind, a 1999 autobiography by Kristin Nelson
- Out of My Mind, a 1999 novel by Richard Bach
- Out of My Mind, a 2006 book by Andy Rooney
- Out of My Mind, a 2006 novel by Eric Staller

== Music ==
- "Out of My Mind" (Bingo Players song), 2012
- "Out of My Mind" (B.o.B song), 2012
- "Out of My Mind" (Duran Duran song), 1997
- "Out of My Mind" (Johnny Tillotson song), 1963
- "Out of My Mind" (Kanye West song), unreleased
- "Out of My Mind" (Lasgo song), 2008
- "Out of My Mind" / "Holy Water", a WhoCares charity song by Ian Gillan, Tony Iommi & Friends, 2011
- "Out of My Mind", a song by Buffalo Springfield from Buffalo Springfield, 1966
- "Out of My Mind", a song by Gotye from Boardface, 2006
- "Out of My Mind", a song by Gryffin from Gravity, 2019
- "Out of My Mind", a song by James Blunt from Back to Bedlam, 2004
- "Out of My Mind", a song by the John Mayer Trio from Try!, 2005
- "Out of My Mind", a song by the Killers from Wonderful Wonderful, 2017
- "Out of My Mind", a song by Little Image, 2023
- "Out of My Mind", a song by Nikki Lane from All or Nothin', 2014
- "Out of My Mind", a song by Pearl Jam, the B-side of the single "Not for You", 1995
- "Out of My Mind", a song by Saint Etienne from Home Counties, 2017

== See also ==
- Out of Your Mind (disambiguation)
