= Breakbot =

French musician, producer, and DJ (born 1981)

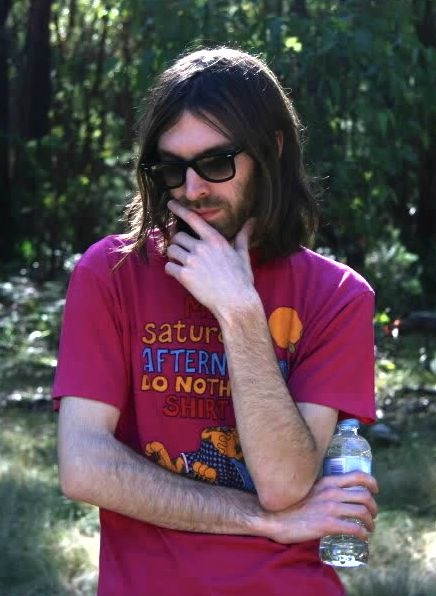
- Breakbot in 2008

Background information
- Born: Thibaut Jean-Marie Michel Berland; October 5, 1981 (age 45); Corbeil-Essonnes, île-de-France, France
- Genres: French house; electro house; disco house; nu-disco; indie; electro-funk; boogie; synthpop
- Occupations: Record producer; musician; DJ
- Years active: 2006–present
- Labels: Ed Banger; Because; Moshi Moshi

Thibaut Jean-Marie Michel Berland (French pronunciation: [tibo ʒɑ̃ maʁi miʃɛl bɛʁlɑ̃]; born October 5, 1981), known professionally as Breakbot, is a French musician, record producer and a DJ who has been signed with Ed Banger Records since May 2009. He is best known for his 2011 hit single "Baby I'm Yours", which went on to become a popular Internet meme.

== Career ==
Breakbot studied at Supinfocom, a computer graphics university. He co-directed the short film Overtime with Oury Atlan and Damien Ferrié. The short won the Ottawa International Animation Festival award for "Best Graduate Film" in 2005 and the Internationales Trickfilmfestival Stuttgart "Young Animation Award" in 2006. Thibaut Berland also prepared advertisements and videos.

In 2007, he participated in the graphic design of the spaceship present on the first album of the group Justice, Cross. Through his involvement with the design, he was introduced to Pedro Winter, founder of the label Ed Banger Records, who signed him.

Breakbot is most recognized for his remixes. His reworkings of songs by artists including Röyksopp, Digitalism, and Chromeo are among his most popular. The music video of "Baby I'm Yours" featuring Irfane was directed by Irina Dakeva and became a summer hit according to MTV Pulse. The music video was nominated for "Best Budget/Independent Video – Pop, Dance, Urban" and "Best Animation in a Video" during the 2010 UK Music Video Awards on October 12, 2010.

In February 2016, he released his second album, Still Waters, composed and produced with his frequent collaborator, Christopher Irfane Khan-Acito ("Irfane"). He also contributed a song for Star Wars Headspace, a Star-Wars themed compilation album released by Disney.

== In popular culture ==
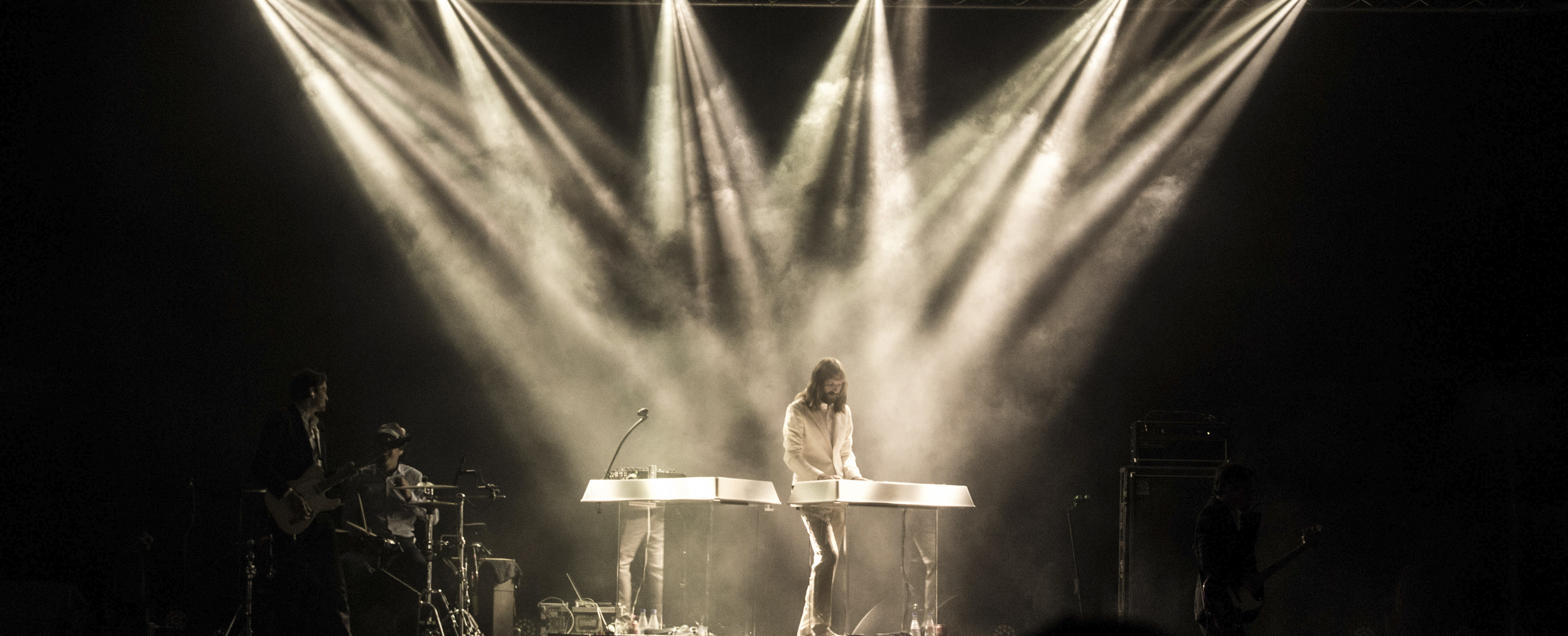
Breakbot at the Festival Internacional de Benicàssim 2016

His 2008 remix of Pnau's song "Baby" appears in the racing video game Gran Turismo 5. Another one of his songs, "Penelope Pitstop", also features in the game. The song "Get Lost" appears in the 2016 racing video game Forza Horizon 3.

Breakbot's position in popular culture is influenced by the similarities between "Baby I'm Yours" and 2012 chart hit "Treasure" by Bruno Mars. "Treasure" was re-registered in ASCAP with new writing credits, which included him and Irfane Khan-Acito, due to the similarities with the former song. In May 2013, during an interview in Tiny Mix Tapes, Breakbot explained that the head of Because Music had mentioned a year before that Mars wanted to cover "Baby I'm Yours". However, as Breakbot was busy finishing his album, "it did not happen". Breakbot called "Treasure" a "rip-off" of his and Irfane's song, in spite of the fact that he was "cool with it"; he explained that he also had many influences in his music "with lots of bits taken from here and there".

In late 2018, his single "Baby I'm Yours" became an Internet meme commonly paired with a voice clip of Paul Bremer announcing Saddam Hussein's capture, with his famous words: "Ladies and gentlemen, we got him."

== Discography ==
=== Studio albums ===
Title	Album details	Peak chart positions	
Title	Album details	FRA	BEL (WA)
By Your Side	Released: September 14, 2012; Label: Ed Banger, Because; Formats: CD, LP, digital download, streaming	19	160
Still Waters	Released: February 5, 2016; Label: Ed Banger, Because; Formats: CD, LP, digital download, streaming	41	—

=== EPs ===
Title	Album details	Peak chart positions
Title	Album details	FRA
Happy Rabbit EP	Released: December 15, 2007 (Moshi Moshi); Released: 2008 (Timberyard Records); Label: Moshi Moshi, Timberyard Records	—
Baby I'm Yours	Released: February 25, 2010; Label: Ed Banger, Because	—
Baby I'm Yours Remix EP	Released: July 2, 2010; Label: Ed Banger, Because	—
Fantasy	Released: June 17, 2011; Label: Ed Banger, Because	—
One Out of Two	Released: June 15, 2012; Label: Ed Banger, Because	185
You Should Know (Remixes) (feat. Ruckazoid)	Released: June 28, 2013; Label: Ed Banger, Because	—
Another You	Released: September 28, 2018; Label: Ed Banger, Because	—
Remedy	Released: March 18, 2022; Label: Ed Banger, Because	—
"—" denotes a recording that did not chart or was not released in that territory.

=== Singles ===
Title	Year	Peak chart positions	Certifications	Album
Title	Year	FRA	Certifications	Album
"Happy Rabbit" "Summerparty"	2007	—		Happy Rabbit
"Penelope Pitstop"	2009	—		Edges - A New French Electronic Generation
"Fantasy" (featuring Ruckazoid)	2011	38		By Your Side
"Baby I'm Yours" (featuring Irfane)	2011	28	RIAA: Gold	By Your Side
"One Out of Two" (featuring Irfane)	2012	45		By Your Side
"Break of Dawn"	2012	117		By Your Side
"You Should Know" (featuring Ruckazoid)	2013	—		By Your Side
"Get Lost"	2015	66		Still Waters
"My Toy"	2016	108		Still Waters
"Another You" (featuring Ruckazoid)	2018	—		Another You
"Be Mine Tonight" (featuring Delafleur)	2020	—		Non-album single

=== Songwriting and production credits ===
Title	Year	Artist(s)	Album	Role(s)
"Cœur"	2021	Clara Luciani	Cœur	Co-producer
"Le reste"	2021	Clara Luciani	Cœur	Co-producer
"Le chanteur"	2021	Clara Luciani	Cœur	Co-producer
"Tout le monde (sauf toi)"	2021	Clara Luciani	Cœur	Co-producer
"Respire encore"	2021	Clara Luciani	Cœur	Co-producer
"Amour toujours"	2021	Clara Luciani	Cœur	Co-producer
"La place"	2021	Clara Luciani	Cœur	Co-producer
"Bandit"	2021	Clara Luciani	Cœur	Co-producer
"I Need U Back"	2025	Fujii Kaze	Prema	Bass guitar, guitar, string synthesizer

=== Remixes ===
Year	Song	Artist
2006	"Let There Be Light"	Justice
2007	"Aerius Light"	DatA
2007	"D.O.E.S." (Breakbot's French Pute Mix)	Arrow!!!
2008	"Runway to Elsewhere"	Pacific!
2008	"Hold Me"	Pacific!
2008	"A Thing For Me"	Metronomy
2008	"Bathroom Gurgle"	Late of the Pier
2008	"What's Up Fatlip?" (Breakbot RMX)	Fatlip
2008	"Sweet Sensation"	ALB
2008	"Apollo-Gize" (Breakbot 'Hypnotoad' Extended Remix)	Digitalism
2008	"Lion"	ZZZ
2008	"They Live!"	Evil Nine
2008	"Kelly"	Van She
2008	"When We Were Young"	Sneaky Sound System
2008	"Baby"	Pnau
2009	"Extraball"	Yuksek
2009	"Happy Up Here"	Röyksopp
2009	"Roche"	Sébastien Tellier
2009	"The Edge of a Sunday"	Séverin
2010	"In My Spaceship"	Jan Turkenburg
2010	"So Light Is Her Footfall"	Air
2010	"Nightcall"	Kavinsky
2010	"I Think I Like U 2"	Jamaica
2010	"Without Lies"	Aeroplane
2010	"You Put a Smell On Me"	Matthew Dear
2011	"Siberian Breaks" (Ed Banger All-Stars Remix) (Note: Breakbot is part of the collective Ed Banger All-Stars, alongside So Me and Busy P. Breakbot remixed a part of this remix with a total length of about 10 minutes.)	MGMT
2011	"When the Night Falls"	Chromeo
2011	"Heaven Can Wait"	Charlotte Gainsbourg
2012	"When the Night (feat. Jaw)"	Para One
2013	"Defiant Order"	Birdy Nam Nam
2013	"Trying to Be Cool"	Phoenix
2013	"Paint a Smile On Me"	Black Yaya
2013	"Kiss to Kiss"	The Swiss
2014	"This Song (feat. Andrew Woodhead)"	Busy P
2016	"Love Invaders"	Fatima Yamaha
2018	"S.H.A.K.E."	Mind Enterprises
2018	"Sylvia Says"	Charlotte Gainsbourg
2018	"Lightenup"	Parcels
2019	"Juice" (Breakbot Mix)	Lizzo
2019	"All I Know (feat. Octave Lissner)"	GoldStone
2019	"Superchérie"	-M-
2021	"Shake"	Sam i & Alex Greenwald
2021	"Fireworks (feat. Moss Kena and The Knocks)" (Breakbot & Irfane Remix)	Purple Disco Machine
2021	"Still Got It" (Breakbot's La Fiesta Remix) (Breakbot's Club des Vedettes Remix)	Alex Frankel
2022	"Groovejet (If This Ain't Love)" (Breakbot & Irfane Extended Remix)	Spiller with Sophie Ellis-Bextor
2022	"Run"	Kita Alexander
2022	"Cameo" (Breakbot & Irfane Remix)	Kavinsky
2025	"Do the Dance" (Breakbot & Irfane Remix)	Illit
2026	"Y&I" (Breakbot Dreamix)	DeepFaith
2026	"Young Hearts Run Free"	Candi Staton

=== Features and collaborations ===
Year	Artist	Song
2009	DatA	"So Much In Love"
2020	Yuksek	"The Only Reason" (with Irfane)
2020	Yuksek	"Taqa" (with Irfane)
2021	Ali Love & Nicky Night Time	"Ubiquity"

=== Mixes ===
- Breakbot Summer mix @ Le Mouv' radio 2014
- Breakbot Beatport Live
- Breakbot MixTape: October 2012
- Disco Mini Mix: Dance on Glass
- BBC In New DJ we Trust Heroes Mix
- Valentine Mixtape
- Breakbot Le Mouv' radio 2012
- Annie Mac Minimix
- TILT! Megamix
- The Lazy Sunday Selecta Mixtape
- Ed Banger, part 3 avec Breakbot | Novaplanet Mix
- Bedtime Stories
- Another Mixtape 2018
- Lockdown Boogie
- "By Your Side" Anniversary Mixtape
- Breakbot - The Nova Mix

== Awards and nominations ==
- 2016: Berlin Music Video Awards, nominated in the Best Performer category for '2 good 4 me'
- 2021: Berlin Music Video Awards, nominated in the Best Animation category for 'Be mine tonight'

== Filmography ==
- 2005: Overtime (short) -- directed by Oury Atlan, Thibaut Berland and Damien Ferrie
