= Waterfalls (James Hype song) =

Single by James Hype featuring Sam Harper and Bobby Harvey
- Released: 8 August 2025
- Length: 2:00
- Label: Island; Universal
- Songwriters: James Hype; Sam Harper; Robert James Harvey; Hollie Hammond
- Producers: James Hype; Bobby Harvey

James Hype singles chronology
"Let Me Show You" (2025)	"Waterfalls" (2025)	"Behaviour" (2025)

"Waterfalls" is a song by British music producer James Hype featuring British singer Sam Harper and British music producer Bobby Harvey, released by Island Records and Universal Music on 8 August 2025.

== Background ==
For five years, Harvey persevered in sending demos to Hype, receiving negative responses or no response at all. When Hype heard the demo for "Waterfalls", he found it "raw" and "infectious" and said he would write the song. Within weeks, it was finalised and premiered at EDC Las Vegas, where the crowd reaction was positive. Hype then teased the track several times on stage before its official release.

== Production ==
The song combines mainstream and underground elements, creating a mix of pop and club music, making it suitable for radio, dancefloors, or festivals alike.

Five remixes of "Waterfalls" by Samurai Jay, Ely Oaks, Noah Kraus, Cooper Smith, and Haven were released. Oaks's version has received several reviews, noting influences of hardstyle and techno and praising its "high-energy drops and near-hardstyle intensity".

== Track listing ==
- Digital download and streaming
1. "Waterfalls" – 2:00
- Digital download and streaming – Samurai Jay remix
1. "Waterfalls" (Samurai Jay remix) – 2:01
- Digital download and streaming – Ely Oaks remix
1. "Waterfalls" (Ely Oaks remix) – 1:51
- Digital download and streaming – Noah Kraus remix
1. "Waterfalls" (Noah Kraus remix) – 2:00
- Digital download and streaming – Cooper Smith remix
1. "Waterfalls" (Cooper Smith remix) – 2:42
- Digital download and streaming – Haven remix
1. "Waterfalls" (Haven remix) – 2:09

== Charts ==
Weekly chart performance for "Waterfalls"
Chart (2025–2026)	Peak position
Australia Dance (ARIA)	16
Austria (Ö3 Austria Top 40)	31
Germany (GfK)	17
Germany Dance (GfK)	2
Poland (Polish Airplay Top 100)	21
Slovakia Airplay (ČNS IFPI)	25
UK Singles (OCC)	46
UK Dance (OCC)	7
US Dance/Mix Show Airplay (Billboard)	1

== Certifications ==
Certifications and sales for "Waterfalls"
Region	Certification	Certified units/sales
United Kingdom (BPI)	Silver	200,000^{‡}
^{‡} Sales+streaming figures based on certification alone.

== See also ==
- List of Billboard number-one dance songs of 2025
