= James Hype =

English DJ and record producer (born 1989)

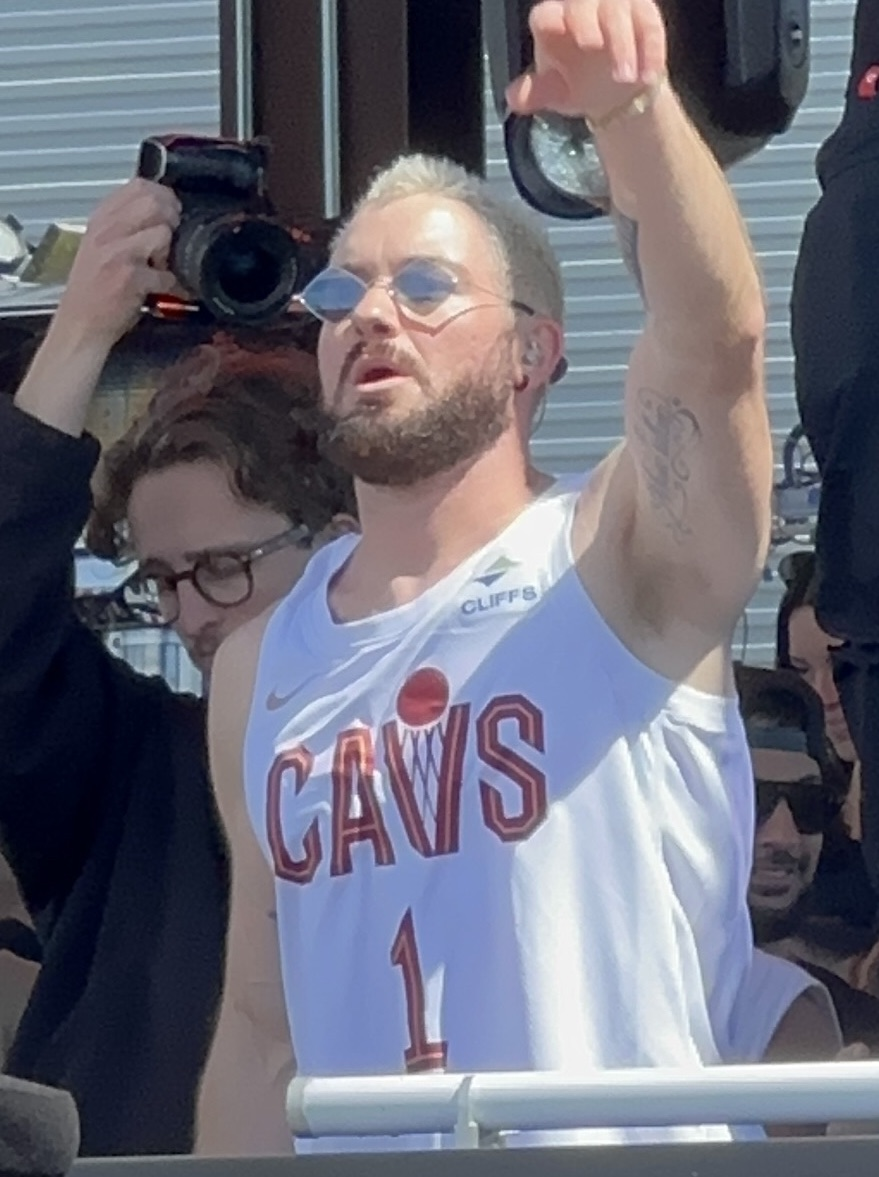
- James Hype in May 2025

Background information
- Born: James Edward Lee Marsland; 26 November 1989 (age 36); Wirral, Merseyside, England
- Origin: Greasby, Merseyside, England
- Genres: Tech House, EDM
- Occupations: DJ; Record Producer
- Years active: 2016–present
- Labels: Stereohype; Warner
- Website: jameshype.com

James Edward Lee Marsland (born 26 November 1989), known professionally as James Hype, is an English DJ and record producer.

== Biography ==
James Hype was born James Edward Lee Marsland on 26 November 1989 in Wirral, Merseyside, England. He attended Calday Grange Grammar School and lived in Greasby.

Marsland discovered online music at the age of 13. This led to his parents buying him a set of DJ decks for his 15th birthday. At the age of 16, Hype started to work as a warm up DJ at a nightclub at Cheshire Oaks Designer Outlet. He began working as a DJ when he was 18, in clubs and bars in Merseyside and Northern England. His first full residency was at Aura Bar in Hoylake. He followed this by DJing all-nighters at Funky Box on Fleet Street in Liverpool's city centre.

In 2018, he collaborated with Craig David on the single "No Drama".

He is best known for the catchphrase "Who Does This?", which is associated with his DJ performances, and his 2022 single "Ferrari" which reached number one in the charts in the Netherlands, Italy and Belgium.

Hype presented a late-night radio show on Thursday nights on KISS FM from July 2017 to November 2019. Hype is an ambassador for DJ equipment manufacturer Pioneer DJ and features in their online videos.

In August 2025 he released the single "Waterfalls" featuring Sam Harper and Bobby Harvey.

Hype is in a relationship with fellow DJ and producer Tita Lau, with the couple getting engaged in August 2023.

== Discography ==
=== Extended plays ===
List of EPs, with selected details
Title	Details
Stereohype Clubworld (Vol 1)	Released: 31 July 2026; Label: Stereohype

=== Singles ===
List of singles, with selected chart positions and certifications
Title	Year	Peak chart positions										Certifications
Title	Year	UK	AUS	AUT	BEL	FRA	GER	IRE	NLD	SWI	WW	Certifications
"More than Friends" (featuring Kelli-Leigh)	2017	8	—	26	12	186	23	20	—	29	—	BPI: Platinum; BEA: Gold; BVMI: Gold
"No Drama" (featuring Craig David)	2018	—	—	—	62	—	—	—	—	—	—	BPI: Gold
"I Was Lovin' You" (featuring Dots Per Inch and Ayak)	2019	92	—	—	—	—	—	—	—	—	—	BPI: Silver
"Afraid" (featuring Harlee)	2020	79	—	—	—	—	—	79	—	—	—	BPI: Silver
"Good Luck" (featuring Pia Mia)	2021	—	—	—	—	—	—	—	—	—	—	
"Ferrari" (with Miggy Dela Rosa)	2022	6	29	4	1	74	4	8	1	2	25	BPI: Platinum; ARIA: Platinum; BEA: Platinum; BVMI: Platinum; IFPI SWI: 2× Platinum; SNEP: Platinum
"Drums" (featuring Kim Petras)	2023	—	—	—	—	—	—	—	—	—	—	
"Wild"	2024	—	—	—	—	—	—	—	—	—	—	
"Feel My Needs" (with Weiss)	2024	—	—	—	—	—	—	—	—	—	—	
"7 Seconds" (featuring Shamiya Battles)	2024	—	—	—	—	—	—	—	—	—	—	
"Don't Wake Me Up"	2025	50	—	—	—	—	—	—	—	—	—	BPI: Silver
"Let Me Show You" (with Camisra)	2025	—	—	—	—	—	—	—	—	—	—	
"Waterfalls" (featuring Sam Harper and Bobby Harvey)	2025	46	—	31	—	—	17	—	—	—	—	BPI: Silver
"Behaviour" (featuring A.D.O.R.)	2025	—	—	—	—	—	—	—	—	—	—	
"More of the Same" (featuring Tita Lau)	2025	—	—	—	—	—	—	—	—	—	—	
"Be Mine"	2026	75	—	—	—	—	—	—	—	—	—	
"Trigger Finger"	2026	—	—	—	—	—	—	—	—	—	—	
"Seratonin"	2026	—	—	—	—	—	—	—	—	—	—	
"1,2,3"	2026	—	—	—	—	—	—	—	—	—	—	
"—" denotes a recording that did not chart or was not released in that territory.

=== Remixes ===
- 2017: Kristine Blond - "Love Shy" (James Hype Remix)
- 2017: Sage The Gemini - "Reverse" (James Hype Remix)
- 2018: Bruno Mars featuring Cardi B - "Finesse" (James Hype Remix)
- 2018: Yxng Bane - "Vroom" (James Hype Remix)
- 2018: Crazy Cousinz featuring Yungen and M.O - "Feelings (Wifey)" (James Hype Remix)
- 2020: Anne-Marie - "Birthday" (James Hype Remix)
- 2020: OutCry featuring Natasha Grano - "Tell Me Why" (James Hype Remix)
- 2020: DJ Solo and FREQ - "Crazy Love" (James Hype Remix)
- 2021: Icona Pop and Sofi Tukker - "Spa" (James Hype Remix)
- 2021: Felix Jaehn and Robin Schulz featuring Georgia Ku – "I Got a Feeling" (James Hype Remix)
- 2022: Belters Only and Jazzy - "Make Me Feel Good" (James Hype Remix)
- 2022: Ferrari Remix (feat Miggy Dela Rosa and Lazza)
- 2022: Claptone and Lau.ra - "Beautiful" (James Hype Remix)
- 2022: David Guetta, Becky Hill and Ella Henderson - "Crazy What Love Can Do" (David Guetta and James Hype Remix)
- 2022: Oliver Heldens featuring Nile Rodgers - "I Was Made For Lovin' You" (James Hype Remix)
- 2023: Kim Petras and Nicki Minaj - "Alone" (James Hype Remix)
- 2025: Charlie Sloth and Mazza_L20 - "Sleep" (James Hype Remix)
- 2025: Waterfalls (feat Sam Harper, Bobby Harvey and Samurai Jay)
- 2026: HAVEN & Kaitlin Aragon - "I Run" (James Hype Remix)
