= Ferrari (James Hype and Miggy Dela Rosa song) =

Single by James Hype and Miggy Dela Rosa
- Released: 15 March 2022
- Recorded: 2021
- Length: 3:05
- Label: Island; The Cross
- Songwriters: James Edward Lee Marsland; Josh Grimmett; Johannes Shore; Michele Carmine; Diddy; Chauncey Hawkins; Adonis; Michael Carlos Jones; Frank Romano; Mario Winans
- Producer: James Hype

James Hype singles chronology
| "Good Luck" (2021) | "Ferrari" (2022) | "Drums" (2023) |

Music video
- "Ferrari" on YouTube

"Ferrari" is a song by English DJ and record producer James Hype and British singer Miggy Dela Rosa, released as a single through Island Records and the Cross on 15 March 2022. It samples "I Need a Girl (Part Two)" by P. Diddy and Ginuwine featuring Loon, Mario Winans, and Tammy Ruggieri (2002). The song charted across Europe, reaching number one on the Belgian Ultratop 50 and Dutch Single Top 100. A remix of the single featuring Italian rapper Lazza was released.

== Reception ==
Radio Kiss Kiss found the song to carry James Hype's "signature bass lines" with a "perfect" vocal by Miggy Dela Rosa in its chorus, all "for what sounds like a summer anthem".

== Charts ==
=== Weekly charts ===
Weekly chart performance for "Ferrari"
| Chart (2022–2023) | Peak position |
|---|---|
| Australia (ARIA) | 29 |
| Austria (Ö3 Austria Top 40) | 4 |
| Belarus Airplay (TopHit) | 136 |
| Belgium (Ultratop 50 Flanders) | 1 |
| Belgium (Ultratop 50 Wallonia) | 7 |
| Bulgaria Airplay (PROPHON) | 3 |
| Canada Hot 100 (Billboard) | 69 |
| Canada CHR/Top 40 (Billboard) | 48 |
| CIS Airplay (TopHit) | 1 |
| Croatia (Billboard) | 4 |
| Czech Republic Airplay (ČNS IFPI) | 100 |
| Czech Republic Singles Digital (ČNS IFPI) | 13 |
| Denmark (Tracklisten) | 7 |
| Estonia Airplay (TopHit) | 20 |
| France (SNEP) | 74 |
| Germany (GfK) | 4 |
| Global 200 (Billboard) | 25 |
| Greece International Streaming (IFPI) | 4 |
| Hungary (Rádiós Top 40) | 1 |
| Hungary (Dance Top 40) | 1 |
| Hungary (Single Top 40) | 1 |
| Hungary (Stream Top 40) | 3 |
| Iceland (Tónlistinn) | 23 |
| Ireland (IRMA) | 8 |
| Italy (FIMI) featuring Lazza | 1 |
| Kazakhstan Airplay (TopHit) | 157 |
| Lithuania (AGATA) | 8 |
| Luxembourg (Billboard) | 4 |
| Moldova Airplay (TopHit) | 6 |
| Netherlands (Dutch Top 40) | 2 |
| Netherlands (Single Top 100) | 1 |
| Poland Airplay (ZPAV) | 3 |
| Poland (Polish Streaming Top 100) | 21 |
| Portugal (AFP) | 25 |
| Romania Airplay (UPFR) | 8 |
| Romania Airplay (Media Forest) | 2 |
| Romania TV Airplay (Media Forest) | 5 |
| Russia Airplay (TopHit) | 2 |
| San Marino Airplay (SMRTV Top 50) | 38 |
| Slovakia Airplay (ČNS IFPI) | 8 |
| Slovakia Singles Digital (ČNS IFPI) | 2 |
| Sweden Heatseeker (Sverigetopplistan) | 6 |
| Switzerland (Schweizer Hitparade) | 2 |
| Ukraine Airplay (TopHit) | 137 |
| UK Singles (Official Charts) | 6 |
| UK Dance (Official Charts) | 4 |
| US Hot Dance/Electronic Songs (Billboard) | 13 |

=== Monthly charts ===
Monthly chart performance for "Ferrari"
| Chart (2022–2023) | Peak position |
|---|---|
| CIS Airplay (TopHit) | 1 |
| Czech Republic (Singles Digitál Top 100) | 16 |
| Estonia Airplay (TopHit) | 25 |
| Lithuania Airplay (TopHit) | 85 |
| Moldova Airplay (TopHit) | 23 |
| Russia Airplay (TopHit) | 2 |
| Slovakia (Rádio – Top 100) | 10 |
| Slovakia (Singles Digitál Top 100) | 2 |

=== Year-end charts ===
2022 year-end chart performance for "Ferrari"
| Chart (2022) | Position |
|---|---|
| Austria (Ö3 Austria Top 40) | 35 |
| Belgium (Ultratop 50 Flanders) | 6 |
| Belgium (Ultratop 50 Wallonia) | 30 |
| CIS Airplay (TopHit) | 16 |
| Denmark (Tracklisten) | 49 |
| Germany (Official German Charts) | 23 |
| Global 200 (Billboard) | 158 |
| Hungary (Dance Top 40) | 17 |
| Hungary (Rádiós Top 40) | 20 |
| Hungary (Single Top 40) | 7 |
| Hungary (Stream Top 40) | 20 |
| Italy (FIMI) | 13 |
| Lithuania (AGATA) | 40 |
| Netherlands (Dutch Top 40) | 7 |
| Netherlands (Single Top 100) | 4 |
| Poland (ZPAV) | 37 |
| Russia Airplay (TopHit) | 31 |
| Switzerland (Schweizer Hitparade) | 20 |
| UK Singles (OCC) | 63 |
| US Hot Dance/Electronic Songs (Billboard) | 39 |

2023 year-end chart performance for "Ferrari"
| Chart (2023) | Position |
|---|---|
| Austria (Ö3 Austria Top 40) | 38 |
| CIS Airplay (TopHit) | 45 |
| Denmark (Tracklisten) | 19 |
| Estonia Airplay (TopHit) | 162 |
| Germany (Official German Charts) | 55 |
| Hungary (Dance Top 40) | 9 |
| Hungary (Rádiós Top 40) | 35 |
| Italy (FIMI) | 53 |
| Moldova Airplay (TopHit) | 32 |
| Netherlands (Single Top 100) | 96 |
| Romania Airplay (TopHit) | 31 |
| Russia Airplay (TopHit) | 74 |
| Switzerland (Schweizer Hitparade) | 34 |

2024 year-end chart performance for "Ferrari"
| Chart (2024) | Position |
|---|---|
| Hungary (Dance Top 40) | 71 |
| Hungary (Rádiós Top 40) | 74 |
| Moldova Airplay (TopHit) | 123 |
| Romania Airplay (TopHit) | 117 |

2025 year-end chart performance for "Ferrari"
| Chart (2025) | Position |
|---|---|
| Moldova Airplay (TopHit) | 118 |
| Romania Airplay (TopHit) | 170 |

== Certifications ==
Certifications for "Ferrari"
| Region | Certification | Certified units/sales |
|---|---|---|
| Australia (ARIA) | Platinum | 70,000^{‡} |
| Belgium (BRMA) | Platinum | 40,000^{‡} |
| Brazil (Pro-Música Brasil) | Diamond | 160,000^{‡} |
| Canada (Music Canada) | Platinum | 80,000^{‡} |
| Denmark (IFPI Danmark) | 3× Platinum | 270,000^{‡} |
| France (SNEP) | Platinum | 200,000^{‡} |
| Germany (BVMI) | Platinum | 400,000^{‡} |
| Italy (FIMI) | 5× Platinum | 500,000^{‡} |
| New Zealand (RMNZ) | Platinum | 30,000^{‡} |
| Poland (ZPAV) | 4× Platinum | 200,000^{‡} |
| Portugal (AFP) | Platinum | 10,000^{‡} |
| Spain (Promusicae) | Platinum | 60,000^{‡} |
| Switzerland (IFPI Switzerland) | 2× Platinum | 40,000^{‡} |
| United Kingdom (BPI) | Platinum | 600,000^{‡} |
| United States (RIAA) | Gold | 500,000^{‡} |
Streaming
| Greece (IFPI Greece) | 2× Platinum | 4,000,000^{†} |
^{‡} Sales+streaming figures based on certification alone.^{†} Streaming-only figures based on certification alone.
