= Heather Bright =

American songwriter

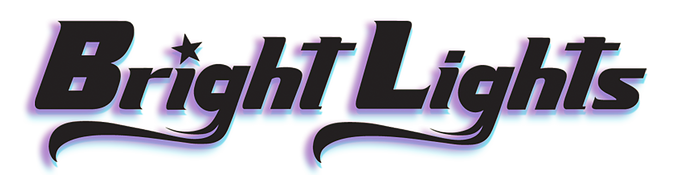

Background information
- Also known as: Bright Lights
- Born: Heather Dawn Bright; Spartanburg, South Carolina, U.S.
- Genres: Pop; EDM
- Occupations: Singer; songwriter; record producer
- Years active: 2006–present
- Label: 333 Recordings
- Website: www.brightlightsofficial.com

Heather Dawn Bright, also known by her stage name Bright Lights, is an American singer, songwriter and record producer.

== Early life ==
Bright, whose father was a pastor during most of her childhood, began her music career singing in churches at a very early age. At 19, she moved to Boston, Massachusetts to pursue a recording career and attend Berklee College of Music. In 2005, she was chosen to appear as a contestant on the UPN reality TV series Road To Stardom with Missy Elliott, where she competed for a recording contract. Following her appearance on the show, Bright moved to New York City where she began her career as a songwriter.

== Career ==
Bright's first release came in 2009 with Ashley Tisdale's "Hot Mess" off her second studio album Guilty Pleasure. Guilty Pleasure debuted at No. 12 on the Billboard 200 charts. She went on to write for a host of other artists including Britney Spears, Usher, Toni Braxton, The Wanted, Far East Movement, Karmin, and Allison Iraheta. Her most successful song to date is Justin Bieber's single "Somebody To Love" which peaked at No. 15 on the Billboard Hot 100 charts and reached Top 10 in Canada. "Somebody To Love" was the second single off Bieber's album, My World 2.0.

In addition to her songwriting career, Bright Lights is also an artist in the electronic genre. Her first artist release came in 2010 with producer Justin Michael. The song, "Trouble", was released through Ultra Records and garnered the "hot shot debut" on the Billboard dance charts, eventually peaking at No. 22. She has since written lyrics for and recorded on several hits in the electronic dance field including Porter Robinson's "Language", Hardwell's and Dyro's "Never Say Goodbye", and 3lau's "How You Love Me". She was also featured on Zedd's Clarity album. Her first solo record "Runaway" landed at number 5 on the Billboard Dance Charts and featured 3lau.

She has performed at many dance venues and festivals around the world including Ultra Music Festival and Electric Daisy Carnival.

== Discography ==
=== As lead artist ===
Year	Title	Peak chart positions
Year	Title	US Dance
2015	"Heartless"	—
2016	"Runaway" (featuring 3lau)	5
2017	"Billion Dollar Love"	—
2018	Gringa (featuring Fito Blanko)	6
2019	"Down for Life" (with 3lau)	—
2020	"War For Love" (with Kaleena Zanders and Kandy)	—
"—" denotes a recording that did not chart or was not released.

=== Featured artist credits ===
Year	Title	Peak chart positions			
Year	Title	US Dance	NL	UK	UK Dance
2010	"Trouble" (Justin Michael & Kemal featuring Heather Bright)	24	—	—	—
2011	"Stars Come Out" (Zedd featuring Heather Bright)	—	—	—	—
2012	"Don't Blame the Party (Mode)" (Bingo Players featuring Heather Bright)	—	55	—	—
2012	"We Are the Sun" (Savoy featuring Heather Bright)	—	—	—	—
2012	"More" (Savoy featuring Heather Bright)	—	—	—	—
2012	"So Bad" (Savoy featuring Heather Bright)	—	—	—	—
2012	"Light It Up" (Flinch featuring Heather Bright)	—	—	—	—
2012	"I Dare You" (Savoy featuring Heather Bright)	—	—	—	—
2012	"Language" (Porter Robinson)	—	—	9	3
2012	"Follow You Down" (Zedd featuring Bright Lights)	—	—	—	—
2013	"Never Say Goodbye" (Hardwell and Dyro featuring Bright Lights)	—	—	—	—
2013	"Escape" (3lau, Paris and Simo featuring Bright Lights)	—	—	—	—
2013	"Ghost" (Pink is Punk and Benny Benassi featuring Bright Lights)	—	—	—	—
2014	"How You Love Me" (3lau featuring Bright Lights)	—	—	—	—
2014	"Dear Life" (Dannic featuring Bright Lights)	—	—	—	—
2014	"Where Are You Now" (Zeds Dead featuring Bright Lights)	—	—	—	—
2014	"Somehow" (Dash Berlin and 3lau featuring Bright Lights)	—	—	—	—
2014	"Let Me Be Your Home" (Hardwell featuring Bright Lights)	—	—	—	—
2015	"Forever" (Dannic featuring Bright Lights)	—	—	—	—
2015	"Believe" (Thomas Gold featuring Bright Lights)	—	—	—	—
2015	"Open Eyes" (Kyle Tree featuring Bright Lights)	—	—	—	—
2015	"Every Step I Take" (Wildstylez featuring Bright Lights)	—	—	—	—
2017	"Paradise" (Laidback Luke and Made in June featuring Bright Lights)	—	—	—	—
"—" denotes a recording that did not chart or was not released.

=== Songwriting credits ===
Year	Artist	Song	Album
2009	Ashley Tisdale	Hot Mess	Guilty Pleasure
2009	Justin Bieber	Somebody To Love	My World 2.0
2010	Fantasia	Even Angels	Back To Me
2010	Far East Movement	Don't Look Now	Free Wired
2010	Toni Braxton	Hands Tied	Pulse
2011	Britney Spears	Trouble For Me	Femme Fatale
2011	Karmin	Crash Your Party	Crash Your Party – Single
