= Don't Blame the Party (Mode) =

Single by Bingo Players featuring Heather Bright
- Released: 13 February 2012
- Recorded: 2011
- Genre: Dance, progressive house
- Length: 2:59 (Radio Edit); 5:59 (Extended Mix)
- Label: Hysteria
- Songwriter(s): Maarten Hoogstraten, Paul Bäumer, Heather Bright
- Producer(s): Bingo Players

Bingo Players singles chronology
"Mode" (2011)	"Don't Blame the Party (Mode)" (2012)	"L'Amour" (2012)

Heather Bright singles chronology
"Stars Come Out" (2011)	"Don't Blame the Party (Mode)" (2012)	"Language" (2012)

"Don't Blame the Party (Mode)" is a song by Dutch dance duo Bingo Players, featuring vocals from Heather Bright. It was first released on 5 December 2011 as the instrumental song "Mode" on Beatport through their label Hysteria. "Don't Blame the Party (Mode)" was released in the Netherlands as a digital download on 13 February 2012 and it has charted at #55 there and at #54 in Belgium. The remixes with Firebeatz and Qulinez were released on 25 June 2012.

== Track listing ==
Dutch digital download
No.	Title	Length
1.	"Don't Blame the Party (Mode)" (Radio Edit)	2:59

Australian digital download
No.	Title	Length
1.	"Don't Blame the Party (Mode)" (Extended Mix)	5:59

Don't Blame the Party (Mode) (The Remixes)
No.	Title	Length
1.	"Don't Blame the Party (Mode)" (Firebeatz Remix)	6:09
2.	"Don't Blame the Party (Mode)" (Qulinez Remix)	6:26

== Chart performance ==
Chart (2012)	Peak position
Belgium (Ultratip Bubbling Under Flanders)	54
Netherlands (Dutch Top 40)	34
Netherlands (Single Top 100)	55

== Release history ==
Region	Date	Format	Label
Netherlands	13 February 2012	Digital Download	Hysteria
Australia	23 March 2012	Digital Download	Onelove
