= More than Friends (James Hype song) =

Single by James Hype featuring Kelli-Leigh
- Released: 7 July 2017
- Recorded: 2016–2017
- Genre: Dance
- Length: 2:20
- Label: Warner Music
- Songwriters: Andrea Martin; Ivan Matias; Marqueze Ethridge; Organized Noize
- Producers: Edward Jenkins; James Hype

James Hype singles chronology
"More than Friends" (2017)	"Love Shy" (2017)

"More than Friends" is a 2017 song by James Hype featuring Kelli-Leigh, it was released by Warner Music on 7 July 2017 and peaked at number 8 in the United Kingdom. The song is a remake of En Vogue's 1996 song "Don't Let Go (Love)", rearranging lines from the track into a new order.

== Track listing ==
=== Digital download ===
No.	Title	Length
1.	"More than Friends"	2:20

=== Digital download EP ===
No.	Title	Length
1.	"More than Friends" (Extended Mix)	4:06
2.	"More than Friends" (VIP Mix)	4:35
3.	"More than Friends" (Illyus & Barrientos Remix)	6:00
4.	"More than Friends" (Mason Remix)	5:02

== Charts ==
=== Weekly charts ===
Weekly chart performance for "More than Friends"
Chart (2017–2018)	Peak position
Austria (Ö3 Austria Top 40)	26
Belgium (Ultratop 50 Flanders)	12
Belgium (Ultratip Bubbling Under Wallonia)	24
Croatia (HRT)	72
France (SNEP)	186
Germany (GfK)	23
Ireland (IRMA)	20
Poland Airplay (ZPAV)	5
Scotland Singles (Official Charts)	4
Slovenia (SloTop50)	28
Switzerland (Schweizer Hitparade)	29
UK Singles (Official Charts)	8
UK Dance (Official Charts)	1

=== Year-end charts ===
2017 year-end chart performance for "More than Friends"
Chart (2017)	Position
Poland (ZPAV)	53
UK Singles (Official Charts Company)	99

2018 year-end chart performance for "More than Friends"
Chart (2018)	Position
Belgium (Ultratop Flanders)	96
Germany (Official German Charts)	85
Slovenia (SloTop50)	45

== Certifications ==
Certifications for "More than Friends"
Region	Certification	Certified units/sales
Belgium (BRMA)	Gold	10,000^{‡}
Germany (BVMI)	Gold	200,000^{‡}
United Kingdom (BPI)	Platinum	600,000^{‡}
^{‡} Sales+streaming figures based on certification alone.

== Release history ==
Release history for "More than Friends"
Country	Version	Date	Formats	Label
United Kingdom	Single	7 July 2017	Digital download	Warner Music
United Kingdom	Extended	1 September 2017	Digital download	Warner Music
