= Still Waters (Breakbot album) =

Studio album by Breakbot
- Released: February 5, 2016
- Genre: French house, electro house, disco house, nu-disco, electro-funk, boogie, synthpop
- Length: 52:29
- Label: Ed Banger
- Producer: Breakbot

Breakbot chronology
By Your Side (2012)	Still Waters (2016)

Professional ratings
Review scores
Source	Rating
AllMusic	4/5 stars
Clash	6/10

Still Waters is the second studio album by French DJ/Producer Breakbot. The album was co-produced by Breakbot and Christopher Irfane Khan-Acito; a member of the hip-hop group Outlines and a frequent collaborator of the French DJ. The album includes three singles: "Back For More", "Get Lost" and "2Good4Me". It was released on Ed Banger Records on February 5, 2016.

== Track listing ==
No.	Title	Length
1.	"Back For More"	4:15
2.	"Arrested"	3:43
3.	"The Sweetest Romance"	3:56
4.	"2Good4Me"	4:01
5.	"My Toy"	3:47
6.	"Get Lost"	4:08
7.	"Turning Around"	3:19
8.	"Man Without Shadow"	4:55
9.	"All It Takes"	4:38
10.	"Wet Dream"	2:20
11.	"Too Soon"	4:09
12.	"In Return"	3:20
13.	"Still Waters"	5:26
Total length:		52:29
