= Cry (Just a Little) =

Single by Bingo Players
- Released: 18 May 2011
- Recorded: 2011
- Length: 3:04 (original version) 2:26 (UK radio edit)
- Label: Big Beat; Hysteria; All Around the World
- Songwriter(s): Scott Cutler; Brenda Russell; Jeff Hull
- Producer(s): Paul Baumer; Maarten Hoogstraten

Bingo Players singles chronology
"Lame Brained" (2010)	"Cry (Just a Little)" (2011)	"Sliced" (2011)

"Cry (Just a Little)" is a song by Dutch dance duo Bingo Players. The song's lyrics are an interpolation from "Piano in the Dark", a 1988 hit song by Brenda Russell. For this song, the line was performed by Kelli-Leigh (vocals) along with Hal Ritson (back vocals).

"Cry (Just a Little)" was released in Belgium as a digital download on 18 May 2011 and was released in the United Kingdom on 18 September 2011. The song charted in Belgium and the Netherlands.

The song was later sampled for the chorus of Flo Rida's 2012 release, "I Cry".

== Music video ==
A music video to accompany the release of "Cry (Just a Little)" was first released onto YouTube on 14 June 2011 onto Spinnin' TV, with a length of 3:26. The official video features Svenja van Beek, who was a singer in the Dutch girl band Djumbo. The video was shot in Marseille, France.

== Track listing ==
Digital download
No.	Title	Length
1.	"Cry (Just a Little)" (original mix)	6:18
2.	"Cry (Just a Little)" (Olav Basoski remix)	6:44
3.	"Cry (Just a Little)" (club edit)	3:58
4.	"Cry (Just a Little)" (radio edit)	3:04
5.	"Cry (Just a Little)" (US radio edit)	2:48
6.	"Cry (Just a Little)" (Olav Basoski remix edit)	3:25
7.	"Cry (Just a Little)" (video)	3:11

UK digital download
No.	Title	Length
1.	"Cry (Just a Little)" (UK radio edit)	2:21
2.	"Cry (Just a Little)" (radio mix)	3:04
3.	"Cry (Just a Little)" (original mix)	6:18
4.	"Cry (Just a Little)" (Olav Basoski mix)	6:44
5.	"Cry (Just a Little)" (XNRG mix)	4:58

== Chart performance ==
=== Weekly charts ===
Chart (2011)	Peak position
Belgium (Ultratop 50 Flanders)	28
Netherlands (Dutch Top 40)	9
Netherlands (Single Top 100)	7
UK Dance (OCC)	7
UK Singles (OCC)	44

=== Year-end charts ===
Chart (2011)	Position
Netherlands (Dutch Top 40)	50
Netherlands (Single Top 100)	36

== Release history ==
Region	Date	Format	Label
Belgium	18 May 2011	Digital download	Mostiko
United Kingdom	18 September 2011	Digital download	All Around the World
