= Out of Your Mind (disambiguation) =

"Out of Your Mind" is a song by True Steppers.

Out of Your Mind may also refer to:

- "Out of Your Mind" (Ava Max song), 2026
- "Out of Your Mind", a song by MisterWives from Nosebleeds
- "Out of Your Mind", a song by French Montana from Montana
- "Out of Your Mind", a song by the Presets from Hi Viz
- "Out of Your Mind", a song by Joe Sun
- Out of Your Mind, an album by Dub Narcotic Sound System

== See also ==
- "Put Him Out of Your Mind", a song by Dr. Feelgood
- Out of Our Minds, an album by Melissa Auf der Maur
- Out of My Mind (disambiguation)
