= By Your Side (Breakbot album) =

Studio album by Breakbot
- Released: September 14, 2012
- Recorded: 2009/2010-2012
- Genres: French house, electro house, disco house, nu-disco, electro-funk, boogie, synthpop
- Length: 46:24
- Label: Ed Banger
- Producer: Breakbot

Breakbot chronology
| By Your Side (2012) | Still Waters (2016) |

Singles from By Your Side
- 1. "Baby I'm Yours" Released: February 15, 2010; 2. "Fantasy" Released: April 22, 2011; 3. "One Out of Two" Released: June 15, 2012

By Your Side is the debut album by French DJ and producer Breakbot that includes the singles "Baby I'm Yours," "One Out of Two" and "Fantasy." It was released through Ed Banger Records on September 14, 2012, and features collaborations with Irfane, Ruckazoid and Pacific!.

The album charted at #19 in France and #160 in Belgium (Wallonia).

== Track listing ==
| No. | Title | Writer(s) | Length |
|---|---|---|---|
| 1. | "Break of Dawn" | Thibaut Berland | 2:20 |
| 2. | "Fantasy" (featuring Ruckazoid) | T. Berland, Ric Ramon | 3:19 |
| 3. | "One Out of Two" (featuring Irfane) | T. Berland, Irfane Khan-Acito | 3:40 |
| 4. | "By Your Side part.1" (featuring Pacific!) | T. Berland, Björn Högberg Synneby | 1:28 |
| 5. | "By Your Side part.2" (featuring Pacific!) | T. Berland, B. Synneby | 3:34 |
| 6. | "You Should Know" (featuring Ruckazoid) | T. Berland, R. Ramon | 4:04 |
| 7. | "The Mayfly and the Light" (featuring Irfane) | T. Berland, I. Khan-Acito | 3:28 |
| 8. | "Programme" | T. Berland | 4:08 |
| 9. | "Easy Fraction" | T. Berland | 1:17 |
| 10. | "Baby I'm Yours" (featuring Irfane) | T. Berland, I. Khan-Acito | 3:38 |
| 11. | "Another Dawn" (featuring Irfane) | T. Berland, I. Khan-Acito | 3:54 |
| 12. | "Why" (featuring Ruckazoid) | T. Berland, R. Ramon | 5:25 |
| 13. | "A Mile Away" (featuring Irfane) | T. Berland, I. Khan-Acito | 3:47 |
| 14. | "Intersection" | T. Berland | 2:33 |
| 15. | "Peanuts" (Bonus Track) | T. Berland | 3:16 |
| Total length: | | | 46:24 |

== Charts ==
| Chart (2012) | Peak position |
|---|---|
| Belgian Albums (Ultratop Wallonia) | 160 |
| French Albums (SNEP) | 19 |

== Album cover ==
The cover of the album features a stylised full-body illustration of Breakbot - a trademark of most of his albums. The figure being made of partially unwrapped chocolate seems to be in reference to the album cover of Chicago X by Chicago.

== In popular culture ==
In late 2018, his single "Baby I'm Yours" became an Internet meme commonly paired with a voice clip of Paul Bremer announcing Saddam Hussein's capture, with his famous words: "Ladies and gentlemen, we got him."
