= Out of My Mind (Bingo Players song) =

Single by Bingo Players
- Released: 12 November 2012
- Recorded: 2012
- Genre: Electro house, Progressive house
- Length: 5:03
- Label: Hysteria, Spinnin Records
- Songwriters: Maarten Hoogstraten, Paul Bäumer
- Producers: Maarten Hoogstraten, Paul Bäumer, Calvin Harris

Bingo Players singles chronology
"L'Amour" (2012)	"Out of My Mind" (2012)	"Get Up (Rattle)" (2012)

"Out of My Mind" is a song by Dutch dance duo Bingo Players. It was written and produced by Maarten Hoogstraten, Paul Bäumer and H&K. It was released in the Netherlands as a digital download on 12 November 2012. The song has charted in Belgium.

== Track listing ==
Digital download
No.	Title	Length
1.	"Out of My Mind" (Original Mix)	5:03

Dada Life Remix - Digital download
No.	Title	Length
1.	"Out of My Mind" (Dada Life Remix)	6:04

== Chart performance ==
Chart (2013)	Peak position
Belgium (Ultratip Bubbling Under Flanders)	62

== Release history ==
Region	Date	Format	Label
Netherlands	12 November 2012	Digital Download	Hysteria, Spinnin Records
