= Rattle (song) =

Single by Bingo Players
- Released: 17 October 2011
- Recorded: 2011
- Genre: Electro house
- Length: 4:47
- Label: Hysteria
- Songwriters: Maarten Hoogstraten; Paul Bäumer
- Producers: Maarten Hoogstraten; Paul Bäumer

Bingo Players singles chronology
| "Sliced" (2011) | "Rattle" (2011) | "Mode" (2011) |

"Rattle" is a song by Dutch dance duo Bingo Players. It was written and produced by Maarten Hoogstraten and Paul Bäumer. It was released in the Netherlands as a digital download on 31 October 2011, and worldwide on 6 February 2012, alongside the Candyland remix. The song charted in Austria, the Netherlands and France.

In 2013, "Rattle" was also used as the melody in Alexis Jordan's song "Acid Rain".

DJ duo Candyland won a remix contest for the track on the electronic music website Beatport. The song was released as a single and also on an EP.

== Track listing ==
Digital download
| No. | Title | Length |
|---|---|---|
| 1. | "Rattle" (Radio Edit) | 2:52 |
| 2. | "Rattle" (Original Mix) | 4:47 |
| 3. | "Rattle" (Candyland Remix) | 3:50 |

== Chart performance ==
| Chart (2012–2013) | Peak position |
|---|---|
| Austria (Ö3 Austria Top 40) | 46 |
| Colombia (National-Report) | 13 |
| Denmark (Tracklisten) | 35 |
| France (SNEP) | 8 |
| Germany (GfK) | 79 |
| Netherlands (Single Top 100) | 91 |
| Sweden (Sverigetopplistan) | 42 |

== Certifications ==
| Region | Certification | Certified units/sales |
|---|---|---|
| Netherlands (NVPI) | Gold | 10,000^{^} |
| Sweden (GLF) | Platinum | 40,000^{‡} |
Streaming
| Denmark (IFPI Danmark) | Platinum | 1,800,000^{†} |
^{^} Shipments figures based on certification alone.^{‡} Sales+streaming figures based on certification alone.^{†} Streaming-only figures based on certification alone.

== Release history ==
| Region | Date | Format | Label |
|---|---|---|---|
| Netherlands | 31 October 2011 | Digital download | Hysteria |
| Worldwide | 6 February 2012 | Digital download | |
