= Baby I'm Yours (Breakbot song) =

Single by Breakbot

from the album By Your Side
- Released: March 5, 2010
- Genre: Nu-Disco
- Length: 3:38
- Label: Ed Banger
- Songwriters: Thibaut Berland; Irfane Khan-Acito
- Producer: Breakbot

Breakbot singles chronology
| "Fantasy" (2011) | "Baby I'm Yours" (2010) | "One Out Of Two" (2012) |

Music video
- "Baby I'm Yours" (feat, Irfane) on YouTube

"Baby I'm Yours" is a song by the French DJ and record producer Breakbot from his 2012 debut album By Your Side, featuring the vocals of singer Irfane. In 2018, the song became an internet meme, where it was mashed up with a speech given by Paul Bremer announcing the capture of Saddam Hussein.

== Music video ==
The music video for "Baby I'm Yours" directed by Irina Dakeva is unique for its design, as the video is made of approximately 2000 frames of watercolor paint.

== Charts ==
Weekly chart performance for "Baby I'm Yours"
| Chart (2011) | Peak position |
|---|---|
| France (SNEP) | 28 |

== Certifications and sales ==
Certifications for "Baby I'm Yours"
| Region | Certification | Certified units/sales |
|---|---|---|
| Brazil (Pro-Música Brasil) | Gold | 30,000^{‡} |
| France (SNEP) | Platinum | 200,000^{‡} |
| New Zealand (RMNZ) | Gold | 15,000^{‡} |
| United Kingdom (BPI) | Silver | 200,000^{‡} |
| United States (RIAA) | Gold | 500,000^{‡} |
^{‡} Sales+streaming figures based on certification alone.

== Legacy ==
In 2018, the song became a viral trend and internet meme, being mashed up with a speech given by Paul Bremer announcing that American forces had captured Saddam Hussein to the first verse of the song, minus the first line.
