= Why Don't You (song) =

2010 single by Gramophonedzie

Single by Gramophonedzie
- Released: 28 February 2010
- Genre: House; electro swing; jazz house
- Length: 2:50
- Label: Positiva; Virgin
- Songwriter: Kansas Joe McCoy
- Producer: Marko Milićević

Gramophonedzie singles chronology
| "Why Don't You" (2010) | "Out of My Head" (2010) |

Music video
- "Why Don't You" on YouTube

"Why Don't You" is the debut single by Serbian DJ Gramophonedzie. It was released on 28 February 2010 as a download and on 1 March 2010 in CD format. It samples Peggy Lee's 1947 version of the 1936 song "Why Don't You Do Right?". The single was certified gold in Italy.

== Critical reception ==
Fraser McAlpine of BBC Chart Blog gave the song a mixed review stating:

I'm detecting a theme here. After the burlesque boom and all the Winehouse wannabes – and Wiley's reworking of that song by White Town that samples that other song from the olden days – here comes dance music's tribute to the era of jazz, swing and blues. And when I say tribute, I mean taking an old tune and hitting it with a massive mallet until it cracks into a million pieces, then putting the bits back together with micro-robots and spraying it gold.

That is simply how dance music likes to pay tribute to things. Can you imagine how messy Fat Boy Slim's funeral is going to be? Loads messy, that's how.

The song was awarded 3 stars.

== Track listings ==
CD single

1. "Why Don't You" (Radio Edit) – 2:50
2. "Why Don't You" (Bingo Players Mix) – 6:13

Digital download

1. "Why Don't You" (Radio Edit) – 2:50
2. "Why Don't You" (Trevor Loveys Remix) – 5:35
3. "Why Don't You" (DJ Sneak Remix) – 6:45
4. "Why Don't You" (GreenMoney's GramoPhountzied Remix) – 4:44
5. "Why Don't You" (GreenMoney's GramoPhountzied Dub) – 4:50

== Charts ==
=== Weekly charts ===
| Chart (2010) | Peak position |
|---|---|
| Australia (ARIA) | 100 |
| Belgium (Ultratop 50 Flanders) | 7 |
| Belgium Dance (Ultratop Flanders) | 11 |
| Hungary (Dance Top 40) | 13 |
| Hungary (Editors' Choice Top 40) | 8 |
| Israel International Airplay (Media Forest) | 1 |
| Italy (FIMI) | 22 |
| Netherlands (Dutch Top 40) | 17 |
| Netherlands (Single Top 100) | 19 |
| Switzerland (Schweizer Hitparade) | 50 |
| UK Singles (Official Charts) | 12 |
| UK Dance (Official Charts) | 1 |

=== Year-end charts ===
| Chart (2010) | Peak position |
|---|---|
| Belgium (Ultratop 50 Flanders) | 96 |
| Hungary (Dance Top 40) | 36 |
| Italy (FIMI) | 79 |
| Italy Airplay (EarOne) | 45 |
| UK Singles (OCC) | 165 |

== Release history ==
| Region | Date | Format | Label |
|---|---|---|---|
| United Kingdom | 28 February 2010 | Digital download | Positiva Records, Virgin Records |
| United Kingdom | 1 March 2010 | CD single | Positiva Records, Virgin Records |
