= Gramophonedzie =

Gramophonedzie Грамофонџије
- Born: Marko Milićević
- Origin: Belgrade, Serbia
- Genres: House, electro swing
- Occupation: Musician
- Instrument: DJ
- Years active: 2000–present
- Website: gramophonedzie.com

Marko Milićević (Serbian Cyrillic: Марко Милићевић), most known as Gramophonedzie (Serbian: Грамофонџије, romanized: Gramofondžije), is a Serbian DJ from Belgrade. He is best known for his 2010 single "Why Don't You", which peaked at number 12 on the UK Singles Chart.

== Music career ==
=== Early beginnings ===
He started his career in the year 2000 as participant at the Irish RedBull Music Academy. Milićević is known for producing the theme songs for Balkan versions of the TV show Big Brother. He also played at events alongside Tom Novy, Basement Jaxx, Junior Jack and Bob Sinclar to name a few.

=== 2010–present: Breakthrough ===
His debut single "Why Don't You" was released in the UK on 1 March 2010; the song entered the UK Singles Chart on 7 March 2010 at number 12. The song also peaked at number 7 in Belgium, number 19 in the Netherlands and number 61 in Switzerland. In December 2010, he released the single "Out of My Head". In June 2012, he released the single "No Sugar", with Joey Negro and Shea Soul. In November 2012, he released the single "Number One" and in 2013, the single "Not My Groove".

== Discography ==
=== Singles ===
Year	Title	Peak chart positions						Album
Year	Title	AUS	BEL (Vl)	NL	SWI	UK	UK Dance	Album
2010	"Why Don't You"	100	7	19	61	12	1	Non-album singles
2010	"Out of My Head"	—	—	—	—	—	—	Non-album singles
2012	"No Sugar" (with Joey Negro & Shea Soul)	—	—	—	—	—	—	Non-album singles
2012	"Number One"	—	—	—	—	—	—	Non-album singles
2013	"Not My Groove"	—	—	—	—	—	—	Non-album singles
2022	Počinjem da Ludim	—	—	—	—	—	—	Non-album singles
"—" denotes a recording that did not chart or was not released in that territory.

=== Remixes ===
Year	Artist	Track
2007	Da Fuzz	"The First Time (Gramophonedzie Remix)"
2008	Mr. Fuzz feat. Jahmark	"Don't You Want Me (Gramophonedzie Remix)"
2009	Nick Maurer	"Wash My Hands (Gramophonedzie Remix)"
2009	Bad Copy	"Idemo Odma (Gramophonedzie Remix)"
2009	Memphis	"Le Petit" (Gramophonedzie Remix)
2010	Professor Green	"I Need You Tonight (Gramophonedzie Remix)"
2013	The Young Punx	"Kowloon Kickback (Gramophonedzie Mix)"

== Awards and nominations ==
Year	Award	Category	Result
2010	MTV Europe Music Awards	Best Adriatic Act	Won
2010	Serbian Oscar Of Popularity	E-Oscar	Nominated
