= Colette Carr discography =

- Studio albums: 1
- Extended plays: 5
- Singles: 11
- Music videos: 19
- As featured artist: 4
- Mixtapes: 1

Colette Carr is an American singer and rapper. Her discography consists of one studio album, five extended plays, one mixtape and eleven singles as a solo artist, as well as four singles as a featured artist. A music video for her song was released in 2009 called "Back It Up", which became a viral hit and was placed at number one on the MTV Music Chart.

Carr's debut album, Skitszo, was released July 9, 2013. "(We Do It) Primo", the lead single from Skitszo was released May 11, 2011. The fifth single from the album, "Never Gonna Happen" charted in Billboard's US Dance/Club songs at number eleven.

== Albums ==
=== Studio albums ===
Title	Album details	Peak chart positions	
Title	Album details	US	US Dance
Skitszo	Released: July 9, 2013; Label: Cherrytree Records, Interscope Records; Format: Digital download, CD	—	—

=== Extended plays ===
List of EPs, with selected details
Title	Album details
Skitszo (Part 1)	Released: November 13, 2012; Format: Digital download; Label: Cherrytree Records, Interscope Records
Skitszo (Part 2)	Released: January 8, 2013; Format: Digital download; Label: Cherrytree Records, Interscope Records
Skitszo (Part 3)	Released: March 5, 2013; Format: Digital download; Label: Cherrytree Records, Interscope Records
Skitszo (Part 4)	Released: May 7, 2013; Format: Digital download; Label: Cherrytree Records, Interscope Records
Not Sure Yet	Released: November 6, 2014; Format: Digital download; Label: Self-released
Static. Start.	Released: June 23, 2015; Format: Digital download; Label: Kawaii Nation

=== Mixtapes ===
Title	Details
Sex Sells Stay Tooned	Released: August 13, 2010; Format: Digital download; Label: Cherrytree Records, Interscope Records

== Singles ==
=== As main artist ===
List of singles, with selected chart positions, showing year released and album name
Title	Year	Peak chart positions		Album
Title	Year	US Top Triller	US Dance	Album
"(We Do It) Primo"	2011	—	—	Skitszo
"Sex" (featuring New Boyz)	2011	—	—	—N/a
"Like I Got a Gun"	2012	—	—	Skitszo
"F16"	2012	—	—	Skitszo
"Why Are You Leaving?" (featuring Kev Nish)	2013	—	—	Skitszo
"Never Gonna Happen"	2013	—	11	Skitszo
"HAM" (featuring Ben J)	2013	—	—	—N/a
"Static"	2015	—	—	—N/a
"Play House"	2016	—	—	—N/a
"Believe In Us"	2017	—	—	—N/a
"Mike Tyson" (as Tiki Lau)	2020	3	—	—N/a
"—" denotes releases that did not chart or were not released in that territory.

=== As featured artist ===
Title	Year	Peak chart positions	Album
Title	Year	US Dance	Album
"No I.D." (Frankmusik featuring Colette Carr)	2011	—	Do it in the AM
"Pick Your Boogie (The Lady Tigra featuring Colette Carr)	2012	—	SPORK!
"Christmas Wrapping" (Lovestarrs featuring Colette Carr)	2012	—	TBA
"Age Is Just A Number (C4 featuring Colette Carr)	2014	—	TBA

== Guest appearances ==
Title	Year	Artist	Album
"Imma Star"	2009	School Gyrls	Jeremih
"Take U Home"	2010	Stereos	Non-album song
"Go Ape"	2010	Far East Movement	Free Wired
"Caminando (Canciones del Ayer)"	2012	Ádammo	Tiempos Violentos
"Feel The Music"	2014	Nick Cannon	White People Party Music
"Tri Coastal"	2017	Ben Davis	No Apologies

== Music videos ==
Song	Main artist	Year	Notes	Album
"Back It Up"	Colette Carr	2009	Main Artist	Sex Sells Stay Tooned
"Club Love"	The Cataracs	2009	Cameo	Gordo Taqueria
"Bitch Like Me"	Colette Carr	2010	Main Artist	Sex Sells Stay Tooned
"Like a G6"	Far East Movement	2010	Cameo	Free Wired
"Cali, Cali, Cali"	Alyssa Bernal	2010	Cameo	-
"Something Like A Party"	School Gyrls	2010	Cameo	School Gyrls
"Party Rock Anthem"	LMFAO	2011	Cameo	Sorry for Party Rocking
"(We Do It) Primo"	Colette Carr	2011	Main Artist	Skitszo
"Do It in the AM"	Frankmusik	2011	Cameo	Do It in the AM
"No I.D."	Frankmusik	2011	Featured Artist	Do It in the AM
"Pretty Girl Shake It"	The Rangers	2011	Featured Artist	Jerkin' Is Habit VOL.2
"Like I Got a Gun"	Colette Carr	2012	Main Artist	Skitszo
"Dance"	Rye Rye	2012	Cameo	Go! Pop! Bang!
"Turn Up the Love"	Far East Movement	2012	Cameo	Dirty Bass
"F16"	Colette Carr	2012	Main Artist	Skitszo
"Why Are You Leaving?"	Colette Carr	2013	Main Artist	Skitszo
"(B)A$$"	Colette Carr	2013	Main Artist	-
"Never Gonna Happen"	Colette Carr	2013	Main Artist	Skitszo
"HAM"	Colette Carr	2013	Main Artist	-
"Christmas Wrapping"	The Good Natured	2013	Featured Artist	TBA
"Play House"	Colette Carr	2016	Main Artist	Believe in Us
