= Aquarius (Tinashe album) =

- Original album cover (Note: In 2020, the album artwork was changed by Tinashe's request on all digital editions, to the artwork on the back cover of the physical edition. The revised image was the originally intended cover art for Aquarius before RCA Records required the change.)

Studio album by Tinashe
- Released: October 3, 2014
- Recorded: 2012–2014
- Studios: Farlow (Note: Track 1); Tinashe's home studio (Los Angeles) (Note: Tracks 1 and 2); Westlake (Los Angeles) (Note: Track 2); Clockwork (Los Angeles) (Note: ASAP Rocky's vocals on track 8); Downtown (New York City) (Note: Tracks 9 and 13); TempleBase (Hollywood) (Note: Tracks 11 and 16); Eardrumma (Atlanta) (Note: Track 14); Luis Entertainment (Note: Engineering on track 17)
- Length: 55:43
- Label: RCA
- Producers: Blood Diamonds; Boi-1da; Jasper Cameron; Cashmere Cat; Evian Christ; DJ Dahi; Detail; Legacy; Dijon "DJ Mustard" McFarlane; Michel; Mike Nazzaro; Mike Will Made It; Nic Nac; Osinachi Nwaneri; The Order; Redwine; Ritz Reynolds; Stargate; SykSense; Trevor Jerideau; Tinashe; DJ Marley Waters

Tinashe chronology
Black Water (2013)	Aquarius (2014)	Amethyst (2015)

Alternative cover
- Physical back cover and 2020 digital revised cover art

Singles from Aquarius
- 1. "2 On" Released: January 21, 2014; 2. "Pretend" Released: August 22, 2014; 3. "All Hands on Deck" Released: February 24, 2015

Aquarius is the debut studio album by American singer Tinashe. It was released on October 3, 2014, through RCA Records. In 2011, after the disbandment of the girl group the Stunners, Tinashe announced that she would begin pursuing a solo career. The following year, she released her debut mixtape, titled In Case We Die (2012). After raising her profile with the mixtape, Tinashe met with RCA, where she subsequently signed a recording contract. Following her signing a record deal, Tinashe immediately began working on the album. During the recording process, she released two other mixtapes, Reverie (2012) and Black Water (2013).

Aquarius, titled after Tinashe's zodiac sign, incorporates several genres including R&B, alternative R&B, and pop. The album's production was characterized as being synthetic, with atmospherics and minimalist beats and electronics, and its composition drew comparisons to a variety of artists, including the Weeknd and Aaliyah. Most of the songs were written by Tinashe herself, also serving as the album's executive producer alongside Mike Nazzaro.

Upon its release, Aquarius received generally positive reviews from music critics, who commended its production, lyrics, and themes, with reviewers comparing it to the work of Janet Jackson. The album debuted at number 17 on the US Billboard 200, selling 18,821 copies in its first week. It also charted in Australia, France, and the United Kingdom. The album was promoted with the release of three singles—"2 On", "Pretend", and "All Hands on Deck"—with the first reaching number 24 on the Billboard Hot 100.

== Background and recording ==
In 2011, following the disbandment of the Stunners, Tinashe began pursuing her music career as a solo artist. In February 2012, it saw the release of her debut mixtape, In Case We Die (2012). Tinashe signed a deal with RCA Records in July 2012. She subsequently released her second mixtape, Reverie, on September 6, 2012, through her official website. After the release of Aquarius, she stated the album represents "a new season of music and art".

Just working with different people as opposed to just doing everything myself was a definite learning process. It's a slower process, for sure. I've been working on it for a year and a half, while the mixed tapes I produced within a month.

— Tinashe speaking on the album's recording process

In 2012, Tinashe began to work on her debut studio album. Recording sessions took place in Los Angeles, London, Atlanta, New York, and Toronto. In an interview, she revealed that she had been recording and producing the album for two years, compared to her mixtapes, which she created in a month. Tinashe compared the process with her album as being different due to working with other producers, during her mixtapes she made all the "decisions", but when recording the album, she was working with other "creative people", and had to become "comfortable".

During recording, Tinashe recorded and produced the album at her home studio in her bedroom, where she produced some of the interludes included on the album. She described the process as being "tighter" than her previous production. Tinashe also avoided listening to music during recording, not to be heavily influenced by the work of other artists, stating that she wanted the music to come from a "genuine place of inspiration." The guest verses provided by Schoolboy Q and ASAP Rocky were recorded separately and sent to Tinashe via email; however, her collaboration with Future was recorded in the studio together in Atlanta. Speaking about working with Future, Tinashe said, "I went to Atlanta and worked together on the song, and we wrote at the same time."

In December 2013, Tinashe revealed that she had almost completed the recording of the album, with nearly 100 songs being recorded at that point. She also revealed that she was at the final stages of the album's production, in which she was picking and choosing the album's final track listing as well as choosing "key songs" to fill the gaps.

== Composition ==
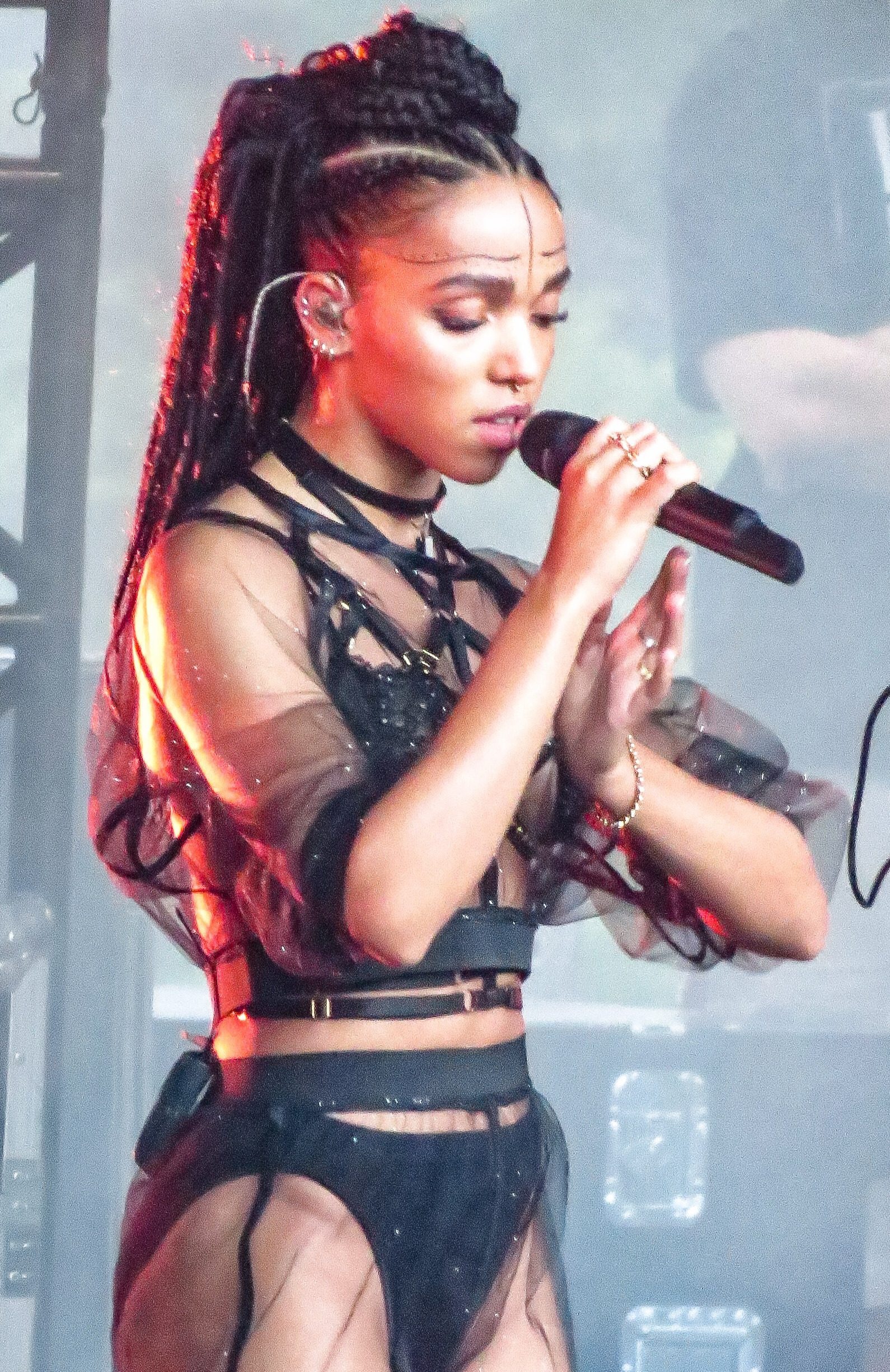
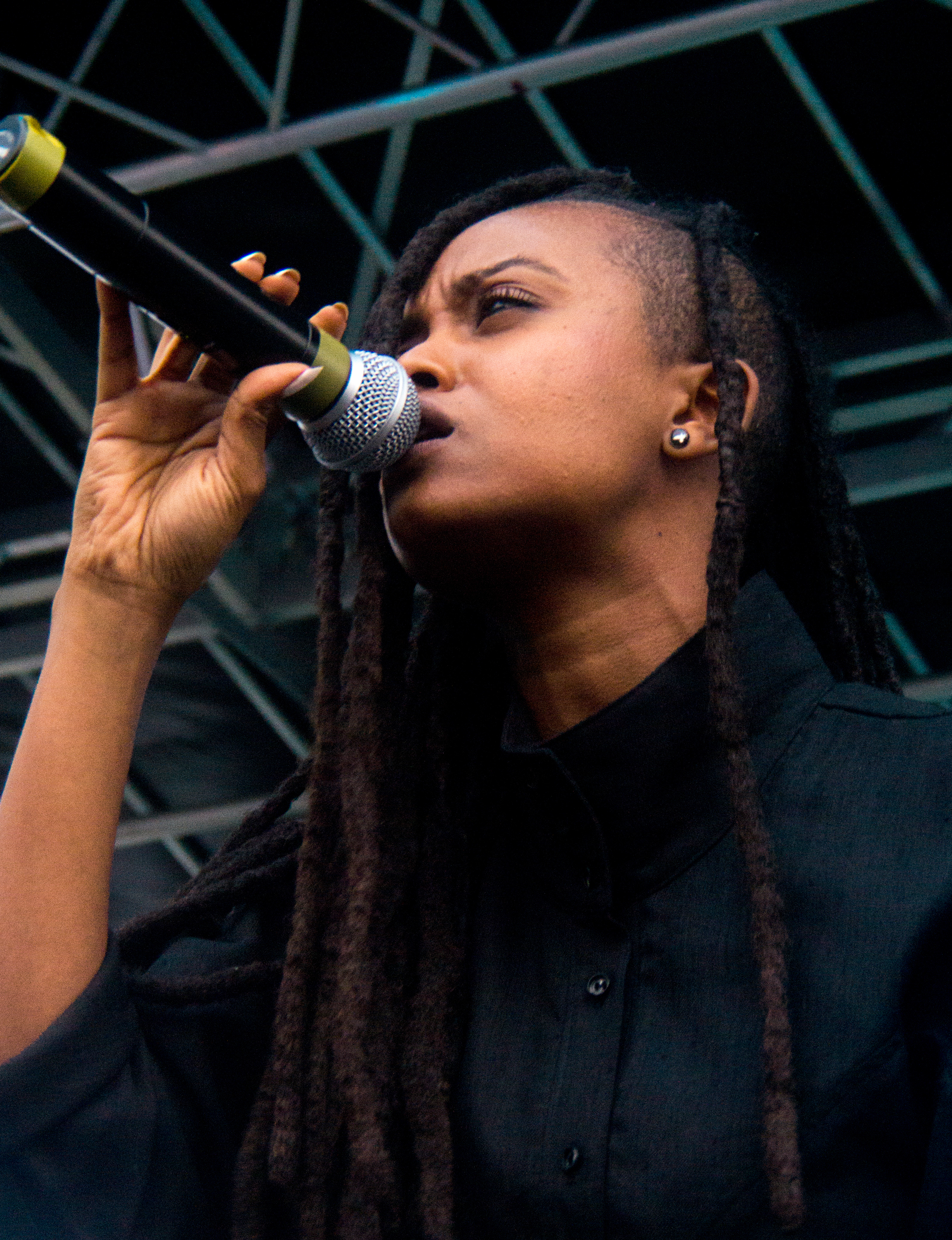
FKA Twigs (left) and Kelela (right), to whom Tinashe was compared by music critics.

Aquarius blends a variety of genres including R&B, alternative R&B, and pop. According to Dean Van Nguyen of NME, the album's music is a mix of the Weeknd's "decadent alt-R&B" and Aaliyah's "seductive cyber-pop". As August Brown of the Los Angeles Times calls the album's music "weird, wonderful world of experimental beat" which he compared to other PBR&B singers, including FKA Twigs and Kelela, continuing to say the album has rhythm and swing "yet cut through with melancholy". Andy Kellman of AllMusic described the album's musical style as being mostly "low-lit, slinking in tempo, and stitched together with several interludes", which Kellman described as being influenced by The Velvet Rope by Janet Jackson.

About the album's production, Nguyen noted it for being "synthetic" and containing "[l]urid, crawling atmospherics led by beats and keys" along with "minimalism, thumping beats and electronics". Kellman described the production as being "laced with small details, subtle twists, and gradual intensification". Sally-Anne Hurley from The Music said the album "falls somewhere between mainstream, radio-friendly R&B and the electro, new-age alternative that's transformed the urban genre in a big way recently".

=== Songs ===
"2 On"
A 23-second sample of "2 On" by Tinashe featuring Schoolboy Q, where the chorus is heard.

The album opens with the intro "Aquarius", which features a "spacey" production with a whispery soul aesthetic, followed by "Bet" featuring Dev Hynes. "Bet" is a "mystical" with "ride-or-die" lyrics, that brushed off "haters", closing with Devonté Hynes performing a guitar outro. "Cold Sweat" is a dynamic song that sees Tinashe observing fake friends and overall sycophancy that comes with stardom. Its production "begins at a crawl before evolving into a pendulum of synths", followed by the album's first interlude titled "Nightfall". "2 On" is an electronic R&B song, marking a slight departure from the murky alternative R&B from her mixtapes. It features "effervescent keys", "synth-string accents", finger snaps, trap hi-hats, electro beats and distant chilly sighs. The song also features a sample of Sean Paul's 2005 single "We Be Burnin'", with the line "Just give me the trees and we can smoke it ya/Just give me the drink and we can pour it ya" featured in the middle eight. Lyrically, "2 On" is a carpe-diem anthem about being "super hyped up, super extra out on whatever emotion that it is." "All Hands on Deck" is a crunk&B song that comprises a thick bassline and a pan flute breakdown. Noted to be a shift from more sweet and coy-sounding tracks on Aquarius, Tinashe solicits a snarling technique in her vocal delivery and the song's lyrical content was noted to combine a dance instructional with the subject of caustic post-break-up stunting, namely in the lyric, "Kiss the old me goodbye / She's dead and gone". It portrays a scenario of a woman retaining her confidence and embracing her love life after a break-up.

== Release and promotion ==
Promoting the album, Tinashe began performing the lead single "2 On". She first performed the song at Power 106 LA concert, Capital Xtra, Rinse FM and Hot 97's Who's Next. Drake also invited her onstage to perform the remix to the song in Houston. Tinashe performed the song on The Wendy Williams Show on July 21, 2014 and on Jimmy Kimmel Live in October. She also performed "All Hands on Deck" on Late Night with Conan O'Brien in April 2015.

=== Singles ===
"2 On", featuring American rapper Schoolboy Q, was released on January 21, 2014, as the lead single from Aquarius. It impacted US rhythmic contemporary and urban contemporary radio on March 18, 2014. The song peaked at number 24 on the Billboard Hot 100 and spent four weeks atop the Billboard Rhythmic chart. On November 24, 2014, "2 On" was certified platinum by the Recording Industry Association of America (RIAA) for shipments of one million units. The album's second single, "Pretend", featuring ASAP Rocky, was released on August 22, 2014. "All Hands on Deck" was sent to US urban contemporary radio on February 24, 2015, as the third and final single from the album.

=== Tour ===
In March 2015, Tinashe was announced as one of the opening acts for the North American leg of Nicki Minaj's the Pinkprint Tour, along with Meek Mill, Rae Sremmurd, and Dej Loaf. In September and October 2015, Tinashe toured South America with Katy Perry on the Prismatic World Tour. She also held her debut concert tour, the Aquarius Tour, which visited North America, Europe, Oceania, and Asia.

== Critical reception ==
Professional ratings
Aggregate scores
Source	Rating
AnyDecentMusic?	6.9/10
Metacritic	80/100
Review scores
Source	Rating
AllMusic	4/5 stars
Billboard	4/5 stars
Exclaim!	7/10
Fact	4/5
Los Angeles Times	3.5/4 stars
NME	8/10
Pitchfork	7.5/10
Q	4/5 stars
Rolling Stone	3.5/5 stars
Slant Magazine	3/5 stars

Aquarius received generally positive reviews from music critics. At Metacritic, which assigns a normalized rating out of 100 to reviews from mainstream publications, the album received an average score of 80, based on 14 reviews.

August Brown of the Los Angeles Times described the album as heralding "an essential new voice", and emphasized how the album brings together contemporary ideas about women, sex, sadness, and musical restlessness into a single, cohesive work. John Kennedy of Billboard described the album as "a lustful listen", noting that its songs frequently focus on themes of emotional union and separation. Meaghan Garvey of Pitchfork observed that as Tinashe moved away from the "distinctly 2010s R&B" sound, she revealed influences rooted in the Y2K era, drawing comparisons to artists such as Janet Jackson and Aaliyah, who balanced mainstream appeal with darker, more personal material. Andy Kellman of AllMusic remarked that although Tinashe's vocals are often "quiet and soft", her abilities remain considerable, pointing to her prominent role as a co-writer on nearly all of the album's tracks.

At Rolling Stone, Julianne Escobedo Shepherd praised the album as "savvy" and "self-assured", stating, "Throughout, Tinashe's sweet soprano sets up a hazy mood that's easy to get lost in." Jabbari Weekes of Exclaim! described the album as "solid", suggesting that while Aquarius does not significantly innovate, it moves with confidence and delivers an "entertaining effort" from the sultry singer. Writing for Q, Steve Yates noted that although the record contains some "generic aspects", including smooth vocals and drifting tempos, Tinashe's voice remains highly adaptable and her lyrics both "suggestive and assertive". Dean Van Nguyen of NME argued that despite its length and moments of excess, calling the 18-track album "overstuffed", Aquarius stands as an "impressive statement" that could elevate Tinashe beyond the expectations set by her earlier mixtapes. Aimee Cliff of Fact pointed to Tinashe's tendency to overcrowd songs with lyrics that swing between being overly literal and obscure, yet ultimately described the album as "complicated and accomplished", crediting it with expanding the promise of the mixtapes while positioning Tinashe as a serious pop contender without losing her introspective edge. In a mixed review, Slant Magazine's Sal Cinquemani found the album "remarkably consistent" given its many producers, but felt that a substantial portion of the material failed to meet that standard. The author particularly criticized certain contributions for sounding "utterly generic" in contrast to more forward-thinking tracks.

=== Year-end lists ===
Publication	Accolade	Rank	Ref.
Billboard	The 10 Best R&B Albums of 2014	3	
The Boston Globe (James Reed)	The Best Albums of 2014	2	
Complex	The 50 Best Albums of 2014	48	
Cosmopolitan	The 20 Best Albums of 2014	6	
Crack	Albums of the Year 2014	47	
Dazed	The top 20 Albums of 2014	9	
Fact	The 50 Best Albums of 2014	49	
Gorilla vs. Bear	Best Albums of 2014	24	
The Guardian	The Best Albums of 2014	26	
Idolator	10 Favorite Albums of 2014	4	
Pitchfork	The 50 Best Albums of 2014	36	
Rolling Stone	20 Best R&B Albums of 2014	3	
Spin	The 50 Best Albums of 2014	8	
Stereogum	The 50 Best Albums of 2014	40	
Vibe	46 Albums from 2014 That Are Actually Worth Your Money	19	
Vulture	The 32 Best Pop Albums of 2014	27	

== Commercial performance ==
Aquarius debuted at number 17 on the Billboard 200, selling 18,821 copies in its opening week. In its second week of sales, the album dropped to number 64 on the chart with 4,950 copies sold. The album also reached number two on the Top R&B Albums chart and number three on the Top R&B/Hip-Hop Albums chart. As of December 2015, Aquarius had sold 70,000 copies in the United States.

== Track listing ==
Aquarius – standard edition
No.	Title	Writer(s)	Producer(s)	Length
1.	"Aquarius"	Tinashe Kachingwe; Brent Reynolds	Ritz Reynolds	3:55
2.	"Bet" (featuring Devonté Hynes)	Kachingwe; Dacoury Natche; Michael Tucker	DJ Dahi; Blood Diamonds	5:40
3.	"Cold Sweat"	Kachingwe; Matthew Samuels; Joshua Scruggs	Boi-1da; SykSense; Sango^{[b]}	5:12
4.	"Nightfall (Interlude)"	Kachingwe	Tinashe	0:07
5.	"2 On" (featuring Schoolboy Q)	Kachingwe; Bobby Brackins; Dijon "DJ Mustard" McFarlane; Jon Redwine; Brendon Waters; Quincy Hanley; Cezar Cunningham; Sean Paul Henriques; Steven Marsden; Delano Thomas; Michael Jarrett; Craig Serani Marsh	McFarlane; Redwine; DJ Marley Waters	3:47
6.	"How Many Times" (featuring Future)	Kachingwe; Jasper Cameron; Sean Notty; Nayvadius Wilburn; James Harris; Terry Lewis	Cameron	3:36
7.	"What Is There to Lose (Interlude)"	Kachingwe; Anthony Thomas	Legacy; Tinashe	0:31
8.	"Pretend" (featuring ASAP Rocky)	Kachingwe; Noel Fisher; Brian Soko; Rasool Diaz; Andre Proctor; Lyrica Anderson; Rakim Mayers; Floyd Bentley III^{[a]}	Detail; The Order	3:53
9.	"All Hands on Deck"	Kachingwe; Mikkel Storleer Eriksen; Tor Erik Hermansen; Magnus August Høiberg; Bleta Rexha	Stargate; Cashmere Cat; Tim Blacksmith^{[c]}; Danny D.^{[c]}	3:41
10.	"Indigo Child (Interlude)"	Kachingwe; Joshua Leary	Evian Christ	1:30
11.	"Far Side of the Moon"	Kachingwe; Osinachi Nwaneri	Nwaneri	4:05
12.	"The Calm (Interlude)"		Tinashe	0:30
13.	"Feels Like Vegas"	Kachingwe; Eriksen; Hermansen; Maureen "Mozella" McDonald; Jeffery Johnson, Jr.	Stargate; Blacksmith^{[c]}; Danny D.^{[c]}	4:01
14.	"Thug Cry"	Kachingwe; Mike L. Williams II; Asheton Hogan; Kalenna Harper	Mike Will Made It; A+^{[d]}	3:28
15.	"Deep in the Night (Interlude)"	Kachingwe	Tinashe	0:57
16.	"Bated Breath"	Kachingwe; Reynolds	Reynolds	5:49
17.	"Wildfire"	Michel Heyaca; Matt Parad; Donna Missal	Michel	3:37
18.	"The Storm (Outro)"	Kachingwe	Tinashe	1:24
Total length:				55:43

Aquarius – Best Buy exclusive edition
No.	Title	Writer(s)	Producer(s)	Length
19.	"Watch Me Work"	Kachingwe; Nicholas Balding; Mark Kragen; Marc Griffin	Nic Nac; Kragen	4:29
Total length:				60:12

Aquarius – Japanese edition
No.	Title	Writer(s)	Producer(s)	Length
19.	"Watch Me Work"	Kachingwe; Balding; Kragen; Griffin	Nic Nac; Kragen	4:29
20.	"Vulnerable" (featuring Travis Scott)	Kachingwe; Jacques Webster	Boi-1da; Vinylz^{[d]}	3:26
Total length:				63:38

Aquarius – Google Play US exclusive limited edition
No.	Title	Writer(s)	Length
19.	"All Hands on Deck" (remix; featuring Iggy Azalea or Dej Loaf)	Kachingwe; Eriksen; Hermansen; Høiberg; Rexha; Deja Trimble	4:01
20.	"Pretend" (remix; featuring Jeezy)	Kachingwe; Fisher; Soko; Diaz; Proctor; Anderson; Mayers; Jay Jenkins	4:13
Total length:			63:57

=== Notes ===
- Despite not being credited as a songwriter of "Pretend" in the album's liner notes, Floyd Bentley is listed as a songwriter by BMI.
- "Vulnerable" was originally included on the 2013 mixtape Black Water.
- ^{^[b]} signifies an additional producer.
- ^{^[c]} signifies an executive producer.
- ^{^[d]} signifies a co-producer.

=== Sample credits ===
- "2 On" contains a sample from "We Be Burnin'" performed by Sean Paul.
- "How Many Times" contains a sample from "Funny How Time Flies (When You're Having Fun)" performed by Janet Jackson.
- "Pretend" contains a sample from "Action" performed by Orange Krush.

== Personnel ==
Credits were adapted from the liner notes.

=== Musicians ===
- Tinashe – vocals
- Julie Slick – additional instrumentation (track 1)
- Dominic Angelella – additional instrumentation (track 1)
- DJ Dahi – programming, keyboards (track 2)
- Blood Diamonds – programming, keyboards (track 2)
- Devonté Hynes – guitar (track 2)
- Schoolboy Q – vocals (track 5)
- Future – vocals (track 6)
- Sean Knotty – additional drums (track 6)
- ASAP Rocky – vocals (track 7)
- Mikkel S. Eriksen – all instruments, programming (tracks 9, 13)
- Tor Erik Hermansen – all instruments, programming (tracks 9, 13)
- Cashmere Cat – all instruments, programming (track 9)
- Roscoe Dash – background vocals (track 13)
- Mike Taylor – background vocals (track 16)
- Donna Missal – background vocals (track 17)

=== Technical ===
- Ritz Reynolds – production (tracks 1, 16); recording (track 1); mixing (track 16)
- Tinashe – recording (tracks 1, 2); production (tracks 4, 7, 12, 15, 18); album production, executive production
- Erik Madrid – mixing (tracks 1, 2, 4, 7, 10–12, 15, 17, 18)
- Vincent Vu – mixing assistance (tracks 1, 2, 4, 7, 10–12, 15, 17, 18)
- DJ Dahi – production (track 2)
- Blood Diamonds – production (track 2)
- Boi-1da – production (track 3)
- SykSense – production (track 3)
- Sango – additional production (track 3)
- Jaycen Joshua – mixing (tracks 3, 5, 6, 8, 14)
- Ryan Kaul – mixing assistance (tracks 3, 5, 6, 8, 14)
- Maddox Chimm – mixing assistance (tracks 3, 6, 8, 14)
- Dijon "DJ Mustard" McFarlane – production (track 5)
- Redwine – production (track 5)
- DJ Marley Waters – production (track 5)
- Legacy – production (track 7)
- Detail – production (track 8)
- The Order – production (track 8)
- Hector Delgado – mixing, recording (ASAP Rocky's vocals) (track 8)
- Gee Bizzy – mixing assistance, recording assistance (ASAP Rocky's vocals) (track 8)
- Stargate – production (tracks 9, 13)
- Cashmere Cat – production (track 9)
- Mikkel S. Eriksen – recording (tracks 9, 13)
- Miles Walker – recording (tracks 9, 13)
- Phil Tan – mixing (track 9)
- Daniela Rivera – additional engineering for mix (track 9)
- Tim Blacksmith – executive production (tracks 9, 13)
- Danny D. – executive production (tracks 9, 13)
- Evian Christ – production (track 10)
- Jaime Velez – recording, engineering (tracks 11, 16)
- Kevin "KD" Davis – mixing (track 13)
- Jeff Halsey – mixing assistance (track 13)
- Mike Will Made It – production (track 14)
- A+ – co-production (track 14)
- Stephen Hybicki – recording (track 14)
- Michel – production, engineering (track 17)
- Trevor Jerideau – album production
- Mike Nazzaro – album production, executive production
- Dave Kutch – mastering

=== Artwork ===
- Erwin Gorostiza – creative direction
- Maria Paula Marulanda – art direction, design
- Michael Schwartz – photography

== Charts ==
=== Weekly charts ===
Weekly chart performance
Chart (2014)	Peak position
Australian Albums (ARIA)	57
Australian Urban Albums (ARIA)	5
French Albums (SNEP)	167
UK Albums (Official Charts)	78
UK R&B Albums (Official Charts)	7
US Billboard 200	17
US Top R&B/Hip-Hop Albums (Billboard)	3

=== Year-end charts ===
Year-end chart performance
Chart (2014)	Position
US Top R&B/Hip-Hop Albums (Billboard)	89

== Certifications ==
Region	Certification	Certified units/sales
New Zealand (RMNZ)	Gold	7,500^{‡}
^{‡} Sales+streaming figures based on certification alone.

== Release history ==
Release dates and formats
Region	Date	Format	Label	Ref.
Germany	October 3, 2014	CD; digital download; streaming	Sony	
Ireland	October 3, 2014	CD; digital download; streaming	RCA	
France	October 6, 2014	CD; digital download; streaming	Sony	
United Kingdom	October 6, 2014	CD; digital download; streaming	RCA	
United States	October 7, 2014	CD; digital download; streaming	RCA	
Australia	October 10, 2014	CD; digital download; streaming	Sony	
Japan	November 26, 2014	CD	Sony	
