= Player (song) =

Single by Tinashe featuring Chris Brown
- Released: October 2, 2015
- Recorded: 2015
- Genre: Synth-pop; R&B
- Length: 3:21
- Label: RCA
- Songwriters: Tinashe Kachingwe; Myron Birdsong; Chris Brown; Lukas Loules; Alexander Kronlund; Chloe Angelides
- Producers: Lulou; Kronlund

Tinashe singles chronology
"All Hands on Deck" (2015)	"Player" (2015)	"All My Friends" (2015)

Chris Brown singles chronology
"Play No Games" (2015)	"Player" (2015)	"Sorry" (2015)

AK-69 singles chronology
"I Still Shine" (2017)	"Player" (2018)	"Brave" (2018)

"Player" is a song recorded by American singer Tinashe, featuring guest vocals by American singer Chris Brown. It was released as a single on October 2, 2015, by RCA Records. The song was written by Tinashe, Myron Birdsong, Brown, its producers Lulou and Alexander Kronlund, and Chloe Angelides. "Player" was originally intended to be the lead single from Tinashe's third studio album, Joyride (2018), but it was later scrapped. An alternate version of the song, featuring Japanese rapper AK-69 instead of Brown, was included on the Japanese edition of Joyride.

== Background and release ==
"Player" was written by Tinashe, Chris Brown, its producers Lulou and Alexander Kronlund, and Chloe Angelides. It features guest vocals from Brown. Regarding the collaboration, Tinashe stated: "I've always kinda wanted to do a song with [Brown]. Obviously, he's one of the best entertainers of our generation... It's just exciting to be able to work with him".

"Player" was originally the lead single from Tinashe's upcoming second studio album, Joyride. It was preceded by the promotional single "Party Favors". Tinashe announced the collaboration in an interview for Travis Mills of Apple Music's Beats 1 on September 23, 2015. A number of snippets of the song leaked online the same day. Several media sources falsely reported that the song was produced by Max Martin, and Boi-1da. RCA Records released "Player" as a digital download on October 2, 2015. An alternate solo version which omits Brown's verse, as well as clean versions of both the original and solo version were also made available the same day. In the United States, "Player" impacted rhythmic contemporary radio on October 13, 2015, and contemporary hit radio on October 27, 2015.

== Composition ==
"Player" is a synth-pop and R&B song. According to Rap-Up, the song "blurs the line between house and R&B", and contains a "slinky" rhythm. It is more pop and dance-indebted than Tinashe's previous material. Tom Breihan of Stereogum writes, "'Player' is very much a club song, but it's got a bit more of the free-floating atmosphere that Tinashe clearly loves so much". With sparse production, the song features incandescent synths reminiscent of Tinashe's 2014 single "2 On", and a pulsing bassline similar to that on her 2014 album Aquarius. Other instruments include drums and keyboards.

At first, the song has a minimal sound and slowly builds with Tinashe performing over stuttered kick, trap beats up until it peaks at the refrain where the track becomes more uptempo, dance-orientated. Unlike most of her previous material, Alex Hudson of Exclaim! observed, "Production-wise, ['Player'] is a dance floor-geared number as thudding beats and twinkling synths are streamlined into a four-on-the-floor thump during the chorus". Brown performs the song's second verse half-sung, half-rapped with braggadocio and in lieu of a full croon. The track then builds up through Brown and Tinashe's appearances combined, and peaks at the final refrain.

With thinly veiled innuendo, the lyrics in "Player" detail Tinashe's search for a lover who shares a similar sexual stamina and serves as a message to the player archetype. Brown's lyrics portray him as the male foil and a potential suitor for Tinashe. Tinashe taunts and provokes Brown, while he tries to prove his worth to her.

A few months after the release, Tinashe revealed that it was not exactly her idea to work with Chris Brown on the song. These comments came after singer Kehlani's suicide attempt, which he labeled a ploy for attention. She stated "It was really the label, It wasn't me" on the collaboration.

== Critical reception ==
Upon its release, "Player" was well received by music critics. Brennan Carley of Spin lauded the song as the "pop smash Q4 needed" and denoted its synth-plinking to be "sweeter" than that of "2 On". Carley concluded that the track veers "into bigger capital P-pop territory with hugely successful results", and that proved Tinashe was "coming for the top spot". Digital Spy's Lewis Corner wrote, "Be warned: you'll want to keep coming back for more", and shared Carley's sentiment; "Tinashe is coming for that pop crown". Similarly, Elias Leight of The Fader wrote that "Tinashe aims towards the top 40" with "Player" which he also deemed as "club-ready". The song was well received by reviewers for Entertainment Weekly; Jessica Goodman deemed it "a thumping single", while Will Robinson felt it was "charged and more celebratory" than "Party Favors".

Zach Frydenlund of Complex said the song was "made for radio", and noted that Brown "actually lays down a pretty fire verse". Courtney Buck of The 405 felt the track was "slickly-produced" and described it as "delicately laced with pop pristine that has a much wider appeal to some of her earlier material". USA Today named it their song of the week; writer Maeve McDermott complimented its pop and dance music direction. Alex Hudson of Exclaim! wrote, "The words 'featuring Chris Brown' aren't exactly a strong selling point due to the singer's questionable personal life," but found "Player" to be "a banger" nevertheless and praised Tinashe's "catchy" melodies.

== Chart performance ==
In the United States, "Player" debuted at number three on the Bubbling Under Hot 100 Singles chart and at number 43 on the Hot R&B/Hip-Hop Songs chart. The single's debut was predominantly attributed to its first-week sales of 24,000 copies. It was further aided by a first-week streaming tally of 1.3 million—39% of which came from Spotify. In the United Kingdom, "Player" bowed at number 85 on the UK Singles Chart issued for October 15, 2015; it marked Tinashe's first top 100 hit on the chart as a lead artist.

== Music video ==
An accompanying music video directed by Emil Nava premiered at Times Square on November 2, 2015.

== Track listings ==
- Digital download
1. "Player" (featuring Chris Brown) [Explicit] – 3:21
- Digital download
1. "Player" (Explicit) – 3:02
- Digital download
1. "Player" (featuring Chris Brown) [Clean] – 3:21
- Digital download
1. "Player" (Clean) – 3:02
- Digital remixes
1. "Player" (Niko The Kid Remix) – 3:56
2. "Player" (Young Bombs Remix) – 3:20
3. "Player" (De$ignated Club Mix) – 4:16
4. "Player" (Luca Lush Remix) – 3:48
5. "Player" (Jai Wolf Remix) – 4:07
6. "Player" (Cutmore Club Mix) – 5:45

== Credits and personnel ==
Credits adapted from Qobuz.

- Tinashe – vocals, writer
- Chris Brown – vocals, writer
- Lukas "Lulou" Loules – writer, producer, bass, drums, keyboards, programming
- Alexander Kronlund – writer, producer
- Chloe Angelides – writer
- Sam Holland – engineering
- Cory Bice – engineering assistant
- Jeremy Lertola – engineering assistant
- Serban Ghenea – mixing, engineering
- John Hanes – engineering

== Charts ==
Chart (2015–2016)	Peak position
Australia (ARIA)	90
Belgium (Ultratip Bubbling Under)	65
France Download (SNEP)	200
Scottish Singles Sales (Official Charts)	68
UK Singles (Official Charts)	85
UK Hip Hop/R&B (Official Charts)	14
US Bubbling Under Hot 100 (Billboard)	3
US Hot R&B/Hip-Hop Songs (Billboard)	39
US Pop Airplay (Billboard)	34
US Rhythmic Airplay (Billboard)	10

== Certifications ==
Region	Certification	Certified units/sales
Australia (ARIA)	Gold	35,000^{‡}
^{‡} Sales+streaming figures based on certification alone.
