= Tabi Bonney discography =

The discography of Washington, D.C.–based rapper Tabi Bonney consists of at least three studio albums and various mixtapes.

== A Fly Guy's Theme (2006) ==
#	Title	Performer(s)	Producer(s)
1	"The Pocket"	Tabi Bonney	mayhem & Psy2ko for H.A.Z.M.A.T. Produktionz
2	"On It"	Tabi Bonney	
3	"Doin' It"	Tabi Bonney & Raheem DeVaughn	Cosmo "MO" Barron
4	"Beat Rock"	Tabi Bonney & DJ Flexx	Cosmo "MO" Barron
5	"Dope"	Tabi Bonney	
6	"Escalator"	Tabi Bonney	
7	"Get Back"	Tabi Bonney	
8	"Crush"	Tabi Bonney & Haziq Ali	Cosmo "MO" Barron
9	"Tick...Tick..."	Tabi Bonney	
10	"Lunchin"	Tabi Bonney	
11	"You"	Tabi Bonney & Shydi	
12	"Top"	Tabi Bonney	Cosmo "MO" Barron

== Dope (2009) ==
#	Title	Performer(s)	Producer(s)
1	"The Blow"	Tabi Bonney	
2	"Go Hard"	Tabi Bonney	
3	"Duhh"	Tabi Bonney	
4	"Radio"	Tabi Bonney ft. Irie Li and Curren$y	Cosmo "MO" Barron
5	"No Sucker"	Tabi Bonney	
6	"Jet Setter"	Tabi Bonney	
7	"Rock Bammas"	Tabi Bonney ft. Haziq Ali	
8	"Rich Kids"	Tabi Bonney ft. Southeast Slim	
9	"Kick Rocks"	Tabi Bonney ft. Irie Li	

== Fresh (2010) ==
#	Title	Performer(s)	Producer(s)
1	"Make A Killing"	Tabi Bonney ft Pusha T (of Clipse)	Arsonal
2	"Get Me"	Tabi Bonney	Arsonal
3	"Radio"	Tabi Bonney ft Curren$y	Nesby Phips
4	"The Slackers"	Tabi Bonney ft Haziq Ali	Kokayi
5	"Killer People"	Tabi Bonney ft Wale	Bubu The Producer
6	"Fever"	Tabi Bonney ft Raheem DeVaughn	Jon Redwine
7	"Go Away"	Tabi Bonney	Cyrus Melchor
8	"Nuthin' But A Hero"	Tabi Bonney	Jon RRedwine
9	"Sunlight"	Tabi Bonney	Nesby Phips
10	"Blinding"	Tabi Bonney	Kokayi
11	"Galaxy"	Tabi Bonney	Bubu The Producer
12	"Winner's Tourney"	Tabi Bonney ft Kokayi	Oddisee
13	"Like A King"	Tabi Bonney ft Wale & Kokayi	Arsonal
14	"Yeah Go"	Tabi Bonney	Team Demo
