= Black Water (Tinashe album) =

Mixtape by Tinashe
- Released: November 26, 2013
- Recorded: 2012–13
- Genre: Alternative R&B
- Length: 33:04
- Label: Self-released
- Producers: B. Hendrixx; Wes Tarte; K-BeatZ; Yung Shaq; J. Mixx; Myles Morgan; Boi-1da; Frank Dukes; Vinylz; !llmind; Gabriel Lambrith; Ryan Hemsworth; Misfitz Sounds; Karon Graham; J. Oliver; Dev Hynes; Best Kept Secret; Inc

Tinashe chronology
Reverie (2012)	Black Water (2013)	Aquarius (2014)

Singles from Black Water
- 1. "Vulnerable" Released: December 5, 2013

Black Water is the third mixtape by American singer Tinashe, released on November 26, 2013 by distributor INgrooves. A follow-up to her second mixtape Reverie, she signed with RCA Records shortly before the release of Black Water; however, it was not issued through the label.

As executive producer, Tinashe enlisted a variety of producers to work with her on the mixtape, including Boi-1da, Best Kept Secret, Dev Hynes, Frank Dukes, Gabriel Lambrith, !llmind, Ryan Hemsworth, and Vinylz. For guest performers, she solely enlisted American rapper Travis Scott. Musically, Black Water follows similar PBR&B and alternative hip-hop tropes heard in her first and second mixtapes; however, it experiments with several other genres such as electronica and neo soul. Its first and only single, "Vulnerable," was released on the same day of the mixtape.

Black Water received positive reviews from music critics, who stated she "has the most promising voices of the new generation of alt-R&B starlets"; some critics called it highly anticipated and a must-listen, while praising Tinashe's vocal growth. Other critics compared the mixtape to the works of Janet Jackson, TLC and Aaliyah.

== Development ==
For the recording of the mixtape Black Water was self-composed and recorded and engineered entirely in Tinashe's bedroom, much like her previous work. Tinashe explained in an interview the meaning behind the mixtape Black Water:

Black water really represents kind of, a period of time. Where it's at night and you know when water is very still and it looks like glass and it's black and you can't see, and I think that's sort of a metaphor for saying, you know the storm is coming, take advantage of this time when everything is all calm and peaceful, and that obviously is another metaphor meaning many other things.

== Critical reception ==
MuuMuse commented on her growth in this mixtape since her past mixtapes saying "like her past two free offerings 2012's In Case We Die and Reverie — Black Water plays host to plenty of sensual vocals, downtempo beats and murky, The Weeknd-leaning mood music for your listening enjoyment past the midnight hour". Fact criticized her vocals falling flat at times saying "The biggest knock on Tinashe has been a voice that often falters at higher registers and tends to get too breathy: that problem is particularly noticeable on the Inc.-produced 'Middle of Nowhere', and she's practically whispering on closer 'Ain't Ready'. Yet, when she balances the breathiness with something more concrete, it pays off. She explores her full range on 'Black Water', knowing when to give a light touch to a melody reminiscent of 90s R&B".

== Track listing ==
Credits adapted from ASCAP and BMI.

Black Water track listing
No.	Title	Writer(s)	Producer(s)	Length
1.	"Black Water"	Tinashe Kachingwe; Ramon Ibanga Jr.; Lambirth	!llmind; Gabriel Lambirth; Karon Graham	2:56
2.	"Before the Storm (Interlude)"	Kachingwe	Tinashe	0:23
3.	"Vulnerable" (featuring Travis Scott)	Kachingwe; Matthew Samuels; Anderson Hernandez; Allen Ritter; Jacques Webster	Boi-1da; Vinylz	3:26
4.	"Secret Weapon"	Kachingwe	Osinachi	3:10
5.	"Video Tapes (Interlude)"	Kachingwe	Tinashe	0:39
6.	"Midnight Sun"	Kachingwe; Craig Balmoris; Julian Nixon	Best Kept Secret; K-BeatZ	4:32
7.	"1 for Me"	Kachingwe; Ryan Hemsworth	Hemsworth	3:28
8.	"Daybreak (Interlude)"	Kachingwe	Tinashe	0:34
9.	"Fugitive"	Kachingwe; Devonté Hynes	Dev Hynes	2:14
10.	"Stunt"	Kachingwe; Ibanga Jr.; Adam Feeney	!llmind; Frank Dukes	3:35
11.	"Just a Taste"	Kachingwe	J. Oliver; Mizfitz Soundz	3:17
12.	"Middle of Nowhere"	Kachingwe; Andrew McKay; Christoper McKay	Inc	3:12
13.	"Ain't Ready..."	Kachingwe	Legacy (New Boyz)	1:32
Total length:				33:04

=== Sampling credits ===
- "Vulnerable" samples "On Sight" and "I'm In It" performed by Kanye West.
- "1 For Me" samples "Let Go" performed by Frou Frou.
- "Stunt" samples "Cop Blood" performed by Frank Dukes.
- "Just a Taste" samples "Anniversary" performed by Tony! Toni! Toné!.

== Release history ==
Region	Date	Format	Label
Worldwide	November 21, 2013	Digital Download	Self-released
