= Who Do You Think You Are (Colette Carr song) =

Song by Colette Carr

from the album Skitszo
- Recorded: 2013
- Genre: Pop · Ska
- Length: 3:52
- Label: Cherrytree Records; Interscope
- Songwriter(s): Colette Carr; Nadir Khayat; Novel Jannusi; Dov Elkabas; Ammerah Roelants
- Producer(s): RedOne; BeatGeek

"Who Do You Think You Are" is a song by American singer-songwriter and rapper Colette Carr from her debut album, Skitszo (2013). The song was written by Carr, Nadir Khayat, Novel Jannusi, Dov Elkabas and Ammerah Roelants and produced by RedOne and BeatGeek. It appears as the opening track from the album and was originally planned to be released as a single.

== Background and composition ==
The song was written by Carr, RedOne, Novel Jannusi, The Prophet and Ammerah Roelants with RedOne also producing the song along with BeatGeek.

"Who Do You Think You Are" is a reggae inspired ska pop song and it is lyrically about Carr lusting after a guy who, she is told by everyone, is bad for her but she loves him and it is making her crazy which is shown in the hook "He make me go bom-bay bada-wada-way bom-bom".
