= All Hands on Deck (song) =

- Iggy Azalea Remix cover

Single by Tinashe

from the album Aquarius
- Released: February 24, 2015
- Recorded: 2013–2014
- Studio: DownTown (New York City)
- Genre: Crunk; R&B; pop
- Length: 3:40
- Label: RCA
- Songwriters: Tinashe Kachingwe; Mikkel Storleer Eriksen; Tor Erik Hermansen; Magnus August Høiberg; Bleta Rexha
- Producers: Stargate; Cashmere Cat

Tinashe singles chronology
"Drop That Kitty" (2015)	"All Hands on Deck" (2015)	"Player" (2015)

Music video
- "All Hands on Deck" on YouTube

"All Hands on Deck" is a song by American singer Tinashe. It impacted urban contemporary radio and was released as a digital download in the United States on February 24, 2015 through RCA Records, as the third single from her debut studio album, Aquarius (2014). The song was co-written by Tinashe, Bebe Rexha, Stargate, and Cashmere Cat, and produced by the latter two. Called a "crunk-n'-b throwback" by Slant Magazine, "All Hands on Deck" contains a prominent pan flute breakdown played by Cashmere Cat and Stargate, a strong bassline and drum beat, and has been described as the "sister song" to the album's lead single "2 On". The track's lyrical content shows confidence in finding a new lover after a break-up, and contain themes of girl power and self empowerment. On February 22, 2015, a remix version of the song premiered online featuring Australian rapper Iggy Azalea, and received a digital-only release on February 24.

The song garnered mixed reviews from music critics who commended its club appeal and Tinashe's vocals, while others called it "hokey" or "generic". Azalea's verse on the promotional remix version was well-received. Tinashe has performed "All Hands on Deck" for radio stations KPWR and Nova 106.9, and as part of her set list for her Aquarius Tour (2014–15).

== Background ==
"All Hands on Deck" was written by Tinashe, Bebe Rexha, Stargate and Cashmere Cat, and produced by the latter two. Stargate and Cashmere Cat were also responsible for the track's instrumentation and programming, while the former recorded the song with Tinashe at DownTown Studios in New York City. "All Hands on Deck" was then mixed by Phil Tan at the Ninja Club in Atlanta, Georgia, and mastered by Dave Kutch at The Mastering Palace, New York City. Other personnel involved included Tim Blacksmith and Danny D. as executive producers, and Daniela Rivera as an assistant engineer. The song's title was first revealed in the announcement of the Aquarius track listing on August 27, 2014. Tinashe then uploaded the original version of "All Hands on Deck" to her SoundCloud page along with the rest of the album on September 30, 2014. Rexha announced the song's single release on January 23, 2015, on Snapchat. On February 9, 2015, Tinashe announced that the single's release will be accompanied by a new version of the song which will contain a new verse from a guest feature. In an interview with WZMX, she stated, "I wanted to put out something that's a little fresh, because the song has been on the album for a few months, so I wanted to give somebody a brand new verse, a little something-something".

On February 21, 2015, Tinashe posted the single's cover art on her Instagram account. A remix version of "All Hands on Deck" was premiered by Perez Hilton on February 22, 2015, featuring Australian rapper Iggy Azalea rapping the song's new verse. The official remix was released as a promotional single for The Great Escape Tour, that both Azalea and Tinashe were scheduled to be a part of during the Spring 2015. It received its radio premiere on WZMX on February 23, 2015. Serving as the third single from Aquarius, it impacted urban contemporary radio and was released as a digital download in the United States on February 24, 2015. "All Hands on Deck" was commercially released in the United Kingdom on April 19, 2015. Another remix featuring DeJ Loaf was released on June 8, 2015.

== Composition ==
"All Hands on Deck"
A 20-second sample of "All Hands on Deck", featuring Tinashe singing the track's chorus hook with a snarling technique, accompanied by a prominent pan flute melody, synthesizer, and a crunk-oriented "club-friendly" beat.

"All Hands on Deck" is an up-tempo crunk&B and R&B-pop song. Billboard wrote that it had a "thick bassline", while MTV noted the "club-friendly beat". Billboard said that Tinashe "incorporated pan flutes and thudding synths into her latest R&B-pop single". Noted to be a shift from the more sweet and coy-sounding tracks on Aquarius, Tinashe solicits a snarling technique in her vocal delivery, together with a more upbeat attitude and in contrast with Azalea's braggadocio. On the promotional remix single, Azalea's rapped verse occurs halfway through the song's duration, at its bridge, with the rapper announcing herself as "Iggs". Described as the "sister song" to Aquarius lead single "2 On", "All Hands on Deck" also garnered comparisons to Cassie's "Long Way 2 Go" (2006), Ying Yang Twins' "Whistle While You Twurk" (2000), and the works of DJ Mustard. While Azalea's verse was noted to recall her single "Fancy" (2014).

Pitchfork described the song as starting with "a blithe dance instructional" which "swiftly devolves into caustic post-break-up stunting" signaled by the lyrics, "Kiss the old me goodbye/ She's dead and gone." BET wrote that the song shows a woman who "gets her swagger back" after a break-up, and "gets back into the game." Iyana Robinson of Vibe viewed the track as a "good-girl-gone-bad anthem," in which Tinashe and Azalea are "bossy and sexed-up". The track also discusses rebound dating, manifested in the lyrics, "When you left, you left me with no choice / I'm looking for a boy to fill this empty void". While Azalea's verse describes the scenario where a new lover finds interest in her style and prowess, "Every night, a different city, different time zone / All I wanna do is get my shine in / Far as fashion and this rappin', I'm who run it now / Walk-throughs cost a hundred thou/ Yo, I'm Iggy, ow". The lyrics were also noted to contain themes of girl power and self empowerment.

== Critical reception ==
"All Hands on Deck" garnered mixed reviews from music critics. Aimee Cliff of Fact said the track was "another bouncy club banger" from the singer. Alex Macpherson of The Quietus called it "irresistible". Exclaim! writer Jabbari Weekes said that while the song's title depicts a "buzzword for a sea foraging adventure," its "water-inspired" motif added cohesiveness and helped entice listeners on the album. Bradley Stern of MuuMuse wrote that the track provided a "truly nasty, finger-snapping alarm call for the dancefloor," and commended its "powerhouse" chorus, and flute instrumentation. Stern went on to comment, "If the 'flute chorus' is the new horn chorus' in pop in 2015, you can peg Tinashe as the trailblazer for the movement". In a review of Aquarius, Pitchfork Media's Meaghan Garvey deemed "All Hands on Deck" the album's "sole answer to the club-readiness of '2 On'". Writing for Complex, Garvey named it the highlight on Aquarius and commented, "how can you go wrong with ratchet pan flutes?". Similarly, Forrest Wickman of Slate opined that it was the sole track on Aquarius that came closest to the "intoxicating heights" of "2 On". "All Hands on Deck" was also called "the standout cut" on the album by Nolan Feeney of Time.

Natalie Weiner of Pigeons & Planes deemed "All Hands on Deck" a "stellar" track and commended Tinashe's "smooth" vocals. Music Times writer Ryan Middleton viewed it as one of the "vastly underrated" tracks on the album and opined that Azalea's verse should assist it in receiving "the shine it deserved in the first place". HotNewHipHop's Trevor Smith wrote that Azalea's verse "bolstered" the song and that its airplay would benefit from it as a result. Similarly, Maurice Bobb of MTV News called Azalea's verse "catchy," and said that the single had "the sonic fuel to really set the charts on fire" and match the success of "2 On". Fuse's Jeff Benjamin wrote that Azalea's braggadocio meshed well with Tinashe's empowering lyrics on "All Hands on Deck," and concluded that the track became one of 2015's "first awesome girl-power anthems" and was "in prime position to become a hit".

The New York Times writer Jon Caramanica described "All Hands on Deck" as a "high-quality copy" of "2 On" and one of the album's "knowing ploys". In a negative review, Slant Magazine's Sal Cinquemani said the song sounded "utterly generic" in comparison with other tracks on Aquarius. Billboard's John Kennedy wrote that the song suffered from a "hokey flute and thick bassline" which failed to meet the standard set by DJ Mustard's production on "2 On" and instead sounded like Disney's "Whistle While You Work" which had been sampled by the Ying Yang Twins for "Whistle While You Twurk". Reed Jackson of XXL called the track "flimsy" and felt Tinashe's vocal was buried "underneath a stew of seemingly every sound DJ Mustard has introduced to the hip-hop world to over the past two years".

== Live performances ==
Tinashe has stated that the track is among her favorite songs to perform live, along with "2 On" and "Bated Breath". She first performed "All Hands on Deck" in an in-studio live rendition for KPWR on October 14, 2014. Tinashe later sang the track at the iHeartMedia Music Summit on January 21, 2015, and reprised it in a performance for Australian radio station Nova 106.9 on February 20, 2015. "All Hands on Deck" was also performed as part of Tinashe's set list for her Aquarius Tour (2014–15). In a review of the tour's stop at Rams Head Live!, Rated R&B's Keithan Samuels said the singer "lit up the stage with her electrifying dance moves" during her rendition of the song. Tinashe and Iggy Azalea performed the remix version of the track for the first time at the Washington State Fair on September 22, 2015.

== Music video ==
On March 11, 2015, an official lyric video for the remix version of the song premiered on Tinashe's Vevo account. On the same day, Tinashe confirmed during an interview with FunX FM in Amsterdam that a music video for the song had just been shot and she was "really excited." On March 24, 2015, she shared a sneak peek with Style.com/Arabia saying, "the music video is coming out very soon, so definitely be on the lookout for that. It's my second single and I'm really excited to share a sneak peek with you." On April 3, 2015, Tinashe announced through her Facebook account that the video would premiere on the following Monday, April 6, and shared a photo diary from the video shoot on the same day with Paper. The official music video for the song (directed by Ben Mor) was filmed at a shipyard in Long Beach, California and premiered on April 6, 2015. Azalea later revealed she was meant to appear in the visuals but could not make the shoot date.

== Track listing ==
- Digital download
1. "All Hands on Deck" (remix) (featuring Iggy Azalea) – 3:40
- Digital download
1. "All Hands on Deck" (remix) (featuring Dej Loaf) – 4:00
- Digital download
1. "All Hands on Deck" [Album track] – 3:41

== Credits and personnel ==
Credits were adapted from the liner notes of Aquarius.

Recording locations

- Recorded at DownTown Studios, New York City
- Mixed at Ninja Beat Club, Atlanta, Georgia
- Mastered at The Mastering Palace, New York City

Personnel

- Tinashe – songwriter, lead vocals
- Iggy Azalea - songwriter, lead vocals
- Stargate – songwriter, producer, all instruments, programming, recording
- Cashmere Cat – songwriter, producer, all instruments, programming
- Bebe Rexha – songwriter
- Phil Tan – mixing
- Daniela Rivera – additional engineering
- Tim Blacksmith – executive producer
- Danny D. – executive producer
- Dave Kutch – mastering

== Charts ==
=== Weekly charts ===
Chart (2015)	Peak position
Australia (ARIA)	45
Belgium (Ultratip Bubbling Under Flanders)	8
Belgium Urban (Ultratop Flanders)	26
Germany (Deutsche Black Charts)	5
Lebanon (Lebanese Top 20)	11
UK Singles (Official Charts Company)	156
UK Hip Hop/R&B (Official Charts)	34
US Bubbling Under Hot 100 Singles (Billboard)	1
US Hot R&B/Hip-Hop Songs (Billboard)	33
US Rhythmic Airplay (Billboard)	11

=== Year-end charts ===
Chart (2015)	Position
Belgium Urban (Ultratop Flanders)	67
Germany (Deutsche Black Charts)	47
US Hot R&B Songs (Billboard)	29
US Rhythmic Songs (Billboard)	44

== Certifications ==
Region	Certification	Certified units/sales
Australia (ARIA)	Gold	35,000^{‡}
New Zealand (RMNZ)	Gold	15,000^{‡}
^{‡} Sales+streaming figures based on certification alone.

== Release history ==
Region	Date	Format	Version	Label	Ref.
United States	February 24, 2015	Urban contemporary radio	Album version	RCA	
United States	February 24, 2015	Digital download	Iggy Azalea version	RCA	
Australia	February 24, 2015	Digital download	Iggy Azalea version	RCA	
United Kingdom	July 31, 2015	Digital download	Iggy Azalea version	RCA	
