= REDi =

American hip hop group

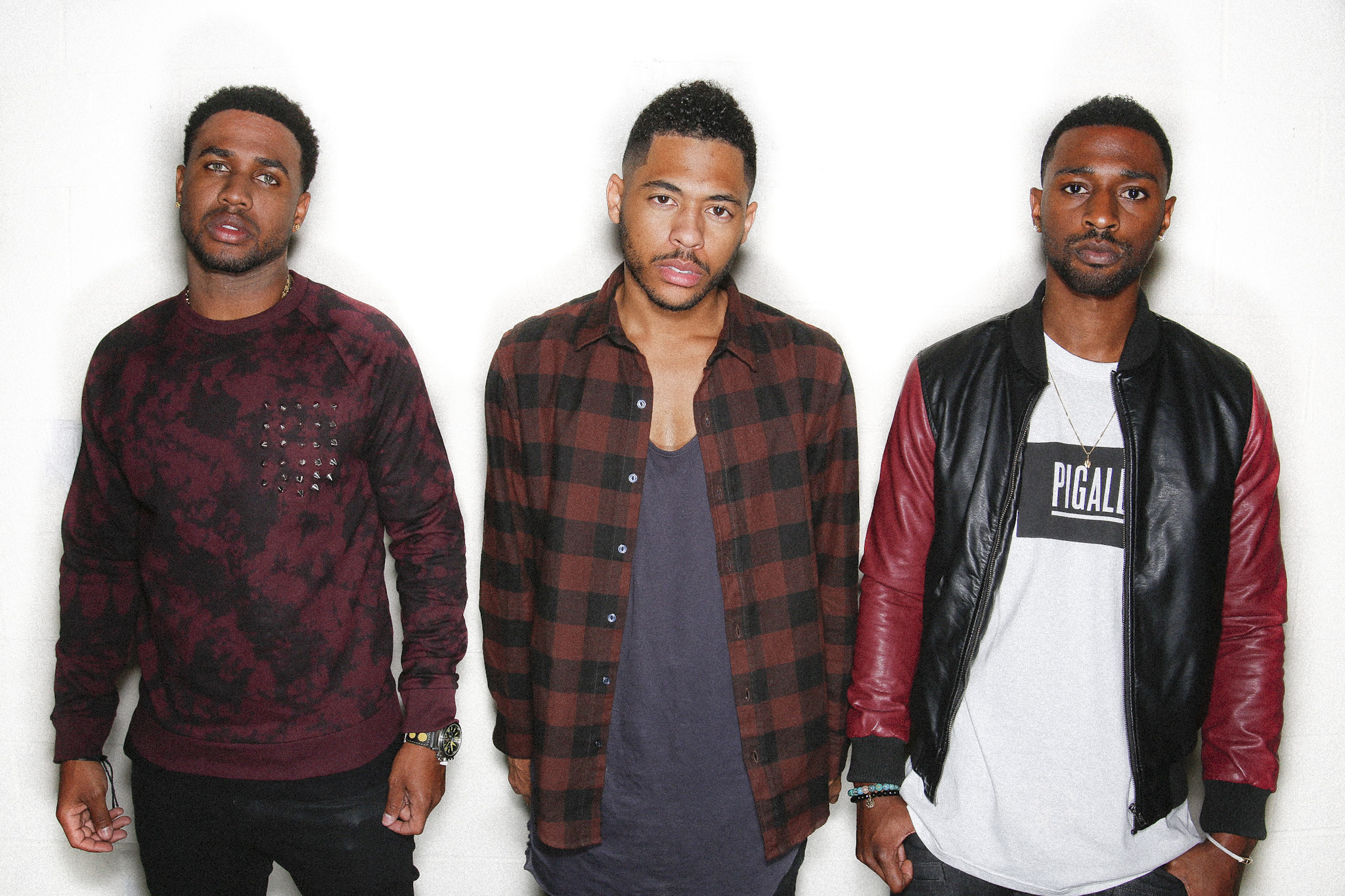
- The Group REDi

Background information
- Origin: Los Angeles, California, United States
- Genres: Urban
- Years active: 2012–present
- Members: Robby Blackwell; Redwine; Aundrus Poole
- Past members: Rob. A
- Website: REDiFlyHigh.com

REDi (pronounced red-eye) is a 3 member Urban Pop ensemble from the United States. Formed in 2012, founding members included singer-songwriter Robby Blackwell, Grammy-nominated songwriter Rob. A, producer and songwriter Redwine, and actor/rapper Aundrus Poole. The group made their debut performance at SXSW, releasing their mix-tape Red Pill in late 2012.

== History ==
=== Formation ===
REDi (pronounced red-eye) was originally formed in 2012 in Los Angeles, California as a four-member Urban Pop ensemble.

Founding members include producer and songwriter Jean-Robert Redwine, who previously worked with Mario, Tabi Bonney and Loick Essien, and singer-songwriter Robby Blackwell. Both Redwine and Blackwell are from Dallas, Texas. Other founders include rapper Aundrus Poole who formerly acted on NBC's Friday Night Lights as series regular Reggie Seale, and Grammy-nominated songwriter and producer Rob. A! from New Jersey. Active since 2008, Rob. A! has written material for Curt Chambers, Chris Brown ("Forever") and Rihanna ("Disturbia").

The members met as collaborators with Redwine. According to Blackwell, "We were all working with Redwine and respected each other’s music, so it just made sense for us to further our collaborations with a group.” Responding to the perception that REDi is a boy band, Blackwell also stated, "We are not. We were not methodically constructed. The formation of REDi was organic in every way.”

Their name has various meanings: "We like the symbolism of the color red – power, passion, love etc. With Redwine being our producer it made sense to keep the word 'RED' in the name, then we added the 'I' to represent the individuality that we each maintain and contribute to the group.”

=== Debut releases ===
The group made their debut performance in March 2012 at SXSW in Austin, Texas, at the KORG Fuse Frequency showcase. They performed after groups Idle Warship, Dawn Richard, Schoolboy Q, J*DaVeY, and 9th Wonder.

They released their debut single "Light the Club" in May 2012. Their debut mixtape, Red Pill, was released in November 2012, with key tracks including "Love Fast" and "Give a F*ck." It was presented by DJ Orator. As of 2013 the group is working on Red Pill Reloaded, which features their latest single "Rollin'" (aka "Pussy and Pillz").

== Members ==
Current members

- Jean-Robert Redwine - production, vocals, songwriting, instrumentation, engineering (2012–present)
- Robby Blackwell - vocals, songwriting (2012–present)
- Aundrus Poole - vocals (2012–present)

Previous members

- Rob. A - production, vocals, songwriting (2012)

== Discography ==
Singles

- 2012: "Light the Club"

Albums

2012: Red Pill
No.	Title	Length
1.	"Popped a Pill"	1:28
2.	"Black Paradise"	3:22
3.	"Love Fast"	3:21
4.	"Good Girls"	4:16
5.	"You Do"	3:13
6.	"Cinema of Hoes"	2:47
7.	"Give a Fuck"	3:19
8.	"In the Air"	2:36
9.	"My Niggas"	3:22
10.	"Shawty Got"	3:14
11.	"Oochie La La"	2:42
12.	"White Skies"	3:00
13.	"Your Amazin"	2:52
14.	"Red Light"	3:41
15.	"Talkin Bout Nothin"	3:41
