= Skitszo =

Skitszo Collection

Studio album by Colette Carr
- Released: July 9, 2013
- Recorded: 2009–2013
- Genres: Pop rap; dance-pop; electropop; electroclash
- Length: 67:32
- Labels: Cherrytree; Interscope
- Producers: BeatGeek; The Cataracs; Cherry Cherry Boom Boom; Frankmusik; Fernando Garibay; Jason Gilbert; MNEK; RedOne; Nate Walker; Marley Waters

Colette Carr chronology
Skitszo Collection (2013)	Believe in Us (2018)

Singles from Skitszo
- 1. "(We Do It) Primo" Released: May 10, 2011; 2. "Like I Got a Gun" Released: June 28, 2012; 3. "F16" Released: November 13, 2012; 4. "Why Are You Leaving?" Released: January 8, 2013; 5. "Never Gonna Happen" Released: March 5, 2013

Skitszo is the debut studio album by American singer-rapper Colette Carr, which was released as a whole on July 9, 2013 through Interscope. The album consists of four digital EPs, each featuring four songs, released two months apart. The full album includes all the songs from the EPs, plus four new ones.

Produced by Cherry Cherry Boom Boom, Frankmusik and other big names, the album features collaborations with YG, Far East Movement's Kev Nish, E-40 and Porcelain Black. Billboard noted the album's genre as a mixture of sing-speak rapping and pop music refrains. Carr was inspired to craft Skitszo after being exposed to works by artists such as the Spice Girls, Talking Heads, and Eminem among others.

== Background and release ==
Carr originally announced that her album would be released in November 2011. Carr released her first promotional single, "Back It Up" in 2009, which gained her the attention of Nick Cannon. She then released her mixtape, Sex Sells Stay Tooned with the help of his label, NCredible, along with his production on tracks. It was highly successful to Carr's standards, gaining 29,000 downloads in four days.

The album was released under Interscope, Cherrytree Records, and NCredible Entertainment. On September 27, 2012 Carr announced that her album would be released in four digital EPs, each released two months apart. Then, on July 9, 2013, the full physical album will be released, featuring all the songs from the EPs, plus four new ones. The complete album was made available for pre-order on November 7, 2012.

== Composition and inspiration ==
Skitszo is a tribute to Carr's uncle, who had schizophrenia. "It's also a tribute to my uncle who suffered from schizophrenia, but more than that it’s a tribute to the man who showed me what true and pure creativity was before he passed away two years ago," said Carr. She described the style of the album as, "musically schizophrenic". Her uncle also inspired the video for Carr's previous single, "Back It Up". Billboard called Skitszo unapologetic pop music that often bounces between sly rapping and affecting refrains.

In and interview with Billboard, Carr highlighted various musical monoliths as inspirational to her album's sound and style. Specifically, the rapper listed Suzanne Vega, Led Zeppelin, Talking Heads, Eminem, and the Spice Girls. On the latter, she said:

"Girl power for life. Every day of your life, the Spice Girls exist within us. That was such a huge part of growing up. I feel like they really put a stamp on girls in my generation. I dressed up like them for Halloween and did little shows with my sister and stuff. I've been every single one of them. My life goal is to be a perfect combination of all five Spice Girls."

== Singles ==
"(We Do It) Primo" was released on May 10, 2011 as Skitszo's lead single. Written by Carr herself and produced by Frankmusik, it samples Keane's song, "Somewhere Only We Know". "(We Do It) Primo" is a pop song with heavy synths. Lyrically, the record speaks of the just having fun, with "Primo" meaning, "Of top quality or importance". The bridge describes “doing it primo” by using various similes including: "sweeter than vanilla" and "playing all of this like it was Christmas". Despite being released internationally, "(We Do It) Primo" failed to chart. Carr makes lyrical references to label mates and fellow musicians Frankmusik, "feeling frank, spelling out the fear inside", a reference to his name and 2010 single "The Fear Inside", and Far East Movement, "better move it, rocketeer", a reference to their 2009 single "Rocketeer".

"Like I Got a Gun" is the second single for Skitszo. Carr released the single on iTunes on June 26, 2012. "Like I Got a Gun" was met with positive reviews from critics. Starpulse called it "a summer-ready party track". and an "ass slapping beat". A remix of the track featuring rapper YG was included on the first installment of the album.

"F16" is the third single for Skitszo. It was released on November 13, 2012 having been previously leaked. The music video for the single was released December 20, 2012.

"Why Are You Leaving?" is the fourth single. It was released on January 8, 2013 and the music video was released the same week, although the video was down on YouTube for sometime mid-2013, but was re-uploaded on October 17, 2013. The song features American rapper Kev Nish from the group Far East Movement.

"Never Gonna Happen" is the fifth single for Skitszo and to date, has become Carr's most successful single. It was released March 5, 2013 as a part of her EP "Skitszo (Part. 3)" on iTunes and the video was released April 5, 2013, Clueless was the music video's main theme. The song also charted #11 on Billboard's Dance Club Songs.

== Track listing ==
No.	Title	Writer(s)	Producer(s)	Length
1.	"Who Do You Think You Are"	Colette Carr; Nadir Khayat; Novel Jannusi; Dov Elkabas; Ammerah Roelants	RedOne; BeatGeek	3:51
2.	"F16"	Carr; Vincent Turner	Frankmusik	3:25
3.	"I Don't Wanna Go"	Carr; Khayat; Martin Kierszenbaum; Achraf Janussi; Alex Papaconstantinou; Björn Djupström; Bilal Hajji	RedOne	3:43
4.	"Never Gonna Happen"	Carr; M. Kierszenbaum; Fernando Garibay	Garibay; Cherry Cherry Boom Boom	3:11
5.	"Told You So" (featuring Porcelain Black)	Carr; Alaina Beaton; Khayat; Hajji; A. Janussi; N. Jannusi	RedOne; BeatGeek	3:23
6.	"One by One"	Carr; M. Kierszenbaum	Cherry Cherry Boom Boom	3:10
7.	"Mes Amis (We Can Party)"	Carr; Khayat; A. Janussi; M. Kierszenbaum; Elkabas; Hajji; Mark Hole; Roelants	RedOne; BeatGeek	3:04
8.	"Killswitch"	Carr; Turner	Frankmusik	3:03
9.	"The Finest Things"	Carr; Kevin Nishimura; Uzoechi Emenike	MNEK	3:27
10.	"Hearsay"	Carr; Turner	Frankmusik	3:24
11.	"Why Are You Leaving?" (featuring Kev Nish)	Carr; Hannah Kierszenbaum; M. Kierszenbaum; Nishimura	Cherry Cherry Boom Boom	4:03
12.	"I Love Kev Nish"	Carr; M. Kierszenbaum	Cherry Cherry Boom Boom	2:12
13.	"(We Do It) Primo"	Carr; Turner; Keane (sample)	Frankmusik	3:12
14.	"Racking Up"	Carr; Jason Gilbert; Anthony Jeffries; Nate Walker	Gilbert	3:26
15.	"Can't Touch This" (featuring E-40)	Carr; Marley Waters; Walker; Earl Stevens; Askia Fountain; Jon Redwine	Walker; Waters	3:34
16.	"Nilly"	Carr; Niles Holowell-Dhar	The Cataracs	3:22
17.	"No I.D." (Frankmusik featuring Colette Carr)	Turner; Carr; Nicolas Dresti; M. Kierszenbaum	Frankmusik; Cherry Cherry Boom Boom	3:13
18.	"Like I Got a Gun" (remix featuring YG)	Carr; M. Kierszenbaum; Keenon Jackson	Cherry Cherry Boom Boom	4:07
19.	"Delusional"	Carr; Turner	Frankmusik	3:29
20.	"Back It Up"	Carr; Hollowell-Dahr	The Cataracs	3:09
Total length:				67:32

- "I Don't Wanna Go" samples Britney Spears's "Oops!... I Did It Again"
- "(We Do It) Primo" samples Keane's "Somewhere Only We Know"

== Personnel ==
As listed on AllMusic.com

- Colette Carr — Composer, Primary Artist
- Frankmusik — Composer
- Martin Kierszenbaum — Composer
- YG — Primary Artist
- The Cataracs — Composer
- Jason Gilbert — Composer
- Anthony Jeffries — Composer
- Hannah Kierszenbaum — Composer
- Kev Nish — Composer, Primary Artist
- Nate Walka — Composer, Background Vocals
- AJ Junior — Composer
- Ameerah — Composer
- Beatgeek — Composer
- Bilal "The Chef" Hajji — Composer
- Niles Hollowell-Dhar — Composer
- Porcelain Black — Composer, Primary Artist
- Prophet — Composer
- RedOne — Composer

== Release history ==
Region	Date	Format	Label
Worldwide	July 9, 2013	CD; digital download	Interscope Records; Cherrytree Records; N'credible Entertainment
