= Aquarius Tour =

2014–15 concert tour by Tinashe

- World tour by Tinashe
- Location: Asia; Europe; North America; Oceania
- Associated album: Aquarius
- Start date: December 5, 2014
- End date: March 17, 2015
- Legs: 4
- No. of shows: 29

Tinashe concert chronology
- Aquarius Tour (2014–2015); Joyride Tour (2016)

The Aquarius Tour was the debut concert tour by American singer Tinashe. It supported Tinashe's debut studio album, Aquarius, which was released on October 7, 2014 through RCA Records. The tour began on December 5, 2014 and concluded on March 17, 2015. It showcased material from Tinashe's debut studio album and mix-tapes. The tour visited Europe, North America, Oceania, and Asia.

== Background ==
On November 12, 2014 Tinashe announced that she would be going on her debut concert in December of that year.

== Shows ==
List of 2014 concerts, showing date, city, country and venue
Date	City	Country	Venue
December 5, 2014	Inglewood	United States	LA Forum
December 11, 2014	Rochester	United States	Blue Cross Arena
December 12, 2014	Pontiac	United States	The Crofoot Ballroom
December 13, 2014	Toronto	Canada	Tattoo Queen West
December 15, 2014	New York City	United States	Highline Ballroom
December 16, 2014	Boston	United States	Brighton Music Hall
December 17, 2014	Washington	United States	Howard Theatre
December 18, 2014	Baltimore	United States	Rams Head Live!
December 19, 2014	Orlando	United States	Beacham Theatre

List of 2015 concerts, showing date, city, country and venue
Date	City	Country	Venue
January 22, 2015	Los Angeles	United States	El Rey Theatre
February 12, 2015	Dubai	United Arab Emirates	RedFestDXB
February 15, 2015	Brisbane	Australia	The Triffid
February 18, 2015	Sydney	Australia	The Metro
February 19, 2015	Perth	Australia	Perth Festival
February 20, 2015	Melbourne	Australia	The Hi-Fi
February 21, 2015	Auckland	New Zealand	Splore Festival
March 2, 2015	London	England	Heaven
March 3, 2015	Birmingham	England	Digbeth Institute
March 4, 2015	Manchester	England	Gorilla Manchester
March 6, 2015	Amsterdam	Netherlands	Paradiso (Amsterdam)
March 7, 2015	Antwerp	Belgium	Trix Club
March 8, 2015	Paris	France	Le Trianon (theatre)
March 9, 2015	Zürich	Switzerland	Mascotte
March 10, 2015	Berlin	Germany	Franz-Club
March 11, 2015	Hamburg	Germany	Mojo Club
March 13, 2015	Copenhagen	Denmark	Vega, Copenhagen
March 14, 2015	Oslo	Norway	Parkteatret
March 15, 2015	Stockholm	Sweden	Fasching
March 17, 2015	Helsinki	Finland	Tavastia Club
