= Pretend (Tinashe song) =

2014 single by Tinashe featuring ASAP Rocky

Single by Tinashe featuring ASAP Rocky

from the album Aquarius
- Released: August 22, 2014
- Recorded: Clockwork Studios (Los Angeles)
- Genre: Pop; R&B
- Length: 3:55
- Label: RCA
- Songwriters: Tinashe Kachingwe; Noel Fisher; Brian Soko; Rasool Diaz; André Proctor; Lyrica Anderson; Rakim Mayers
- Producers: Detail; The Order

Tinashe singles chronology
"2 On" (2014)	"Pretend" (2014)	"Body Language" (2014)

ASAP Rocky singles chronology
"Fashion Killa" (2013)	"Pretend" (2014)	"Multiply" (2014)

Music video
- "Pretend" on YouTube

"Pretend" is a song by American singer Tinashe. It was released as her second single from her debut album Aquarius. The song, which was produced by producer Detail, features a guest verse from Harlem-based rapper ASAP Rocky.

== Composition ==
"Pretend"
A 23-second sample of "Pretend" by Tinashe featuring A$AP Rocky, where the chorus is heard.

In an interview with Rap-Up, Tinashe talked about the concept behind the song. She said "The song with Rocky is definitely kind of a contemporary-sounding song, it doesn’t really sound like a lot of other songs on the radio, but it’s a midtempo feel and it’s kinda minimalistic in the track." And when speaking about the song's meaning, she said, ""Pretend" is basically about when you're in a relationship and instead of dealing with the stuff that you deal with in a relationship, you don't want to do that. You're just going to pretend that everything is fine. I think a lot of people can relate."

"Pretend" is a pop-r&b song written by Tinashe, Lyrica Anderson and ASAP Rocky and was produced by Detail.

== Release and critical reception ==
"Pretend" premiered on August 22, 2014 online.

Exclaim! editor Gregory Adams complimented the singers vocals saying "Her voice builds up to an emotional cry in the chorus, which finds her praising the concept of "a love that never ends." Chris DeVille from Stereogum was less vocal about ASAP Rocky's appearance on the song but praised Tinashe by saying "her performance is the showstopper here."

== Music video ==
The song's official music video, directed by Jodeb, was shot on August 19, 2014 and released on September 29, 2014.

== Credits and personnel ==
Recording locations

- Tinashe's vocals mixed at Larrabee Sound Studios, North Hollywood, Los Angeles
- ASAP Rocky's vocals recorded and mixed at Clockwork Studios, Los Angeles
- Mastered at The Mastering Palace, New York City

Personnel

- Tinashe – songwriter, lead vocals
- ASAP Rocky – songwriter, guest vocals
- Detail – songwriter, producer
- The Order – songwriter, producer
- Lyrica Anderson – songwriter
- Héctor el Father – recording, mixing
- Geebizzy – recording assistant, mixing assistant
- Jaycen Joshua – mixing
- Ryan Kaul – mixing assistant
- Maddox Chimm – mixing assistant
- Contains a sample from "Action", as performed by Orange Krush
- Dave Kutch – mastering

Credits adapted from the liner notes of Aquarius.

== Track listing ==
- Digital download
1. "Pretend" (featuring ASAP Rocky) – 3:52
- Digital download
1. "Pretend Remix" (featuring Jeezy) – 4:16
- Digital download
1. "Pretend" (Dave Audé Remix) – 3:40

== Charts ==
Chart (2014–2015)	Peak position
Australian Hitseekers Singles (ARIA)	12
Czech Republic Singles Digital (ČNS IFPI)	83
Slovakia Singles Digital (ČNS IFPI)	96
UK Hip Hop/R&B (Official Charts)	36
US Bubbling Under Hot 100 Singles (Billboard)	17
US Hot R&B/Hip-Hop Songs (Billboard)	34
US R&B/Hip-Hop Airplay (Billboard)	45
US Rhythmic (Billboard)	29

== Release history ==
Date	Format	Label
August 22, 2014	Digital download	RCA
