= Relief in Abstract =

- Founded: 2011
- Founder: Jered Dowden, Lex Johnson
- Defunct: 2016
- Genre: Electronic
- Country of origin: U.S.
- Location: Orlando, Florida
- Official website: www.reliefinabstract.com

Relief in Abstract is an independent music and arts label based in Orlando, Florida. The label was started as a musical collective in 2011 by Lex Johnson and Jered Dowden while they were in high school, originally as a platform to promote their friends' music. XXYYXX quickly gathered a strong online following and helped to elevate the status of the label overall. The label's brand and website were designed by Guillermo Casanova. Relief In Abstract announced the addition of indie band Out Go the Lights to their roster in September 2013.

== Artists ==
- XXYYXX
- Fortune Howl
- Spies On Bikes
- Marble
- Out Go the Lights

== See also ==
- List of record labels
