= XXYYXX =

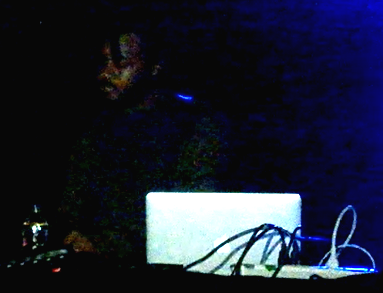

Background information
- Born: Marcel Everett; October 31, 1995 (age 30)
- Origin: Orlando, Florida, U.S.
- Genres: Electronic
- Occupation(s): Musician, producer
- Years active: 2009–present
- Labels: Relief in Abstract, Kitsuné
- Website: xxyyxx.bandcamp.com

Marcel Everett (born October 31, 1995), better known as XXYYXX, is an electronic musician and record producer from Orlando, Florida, formerly signed to the label Relief in Abstract.

His style is likened to Clams Casino, Zomby, Burial, James Blake and The Weeknd. His musical influences include Lapalux, Star Slinger, Disclosure and Shlohmo.

== Career ==
Everett released the 'Still Sound' mixtape in 2011. The next year at 16 years of age he would release his self-titled album, which included the hit 'About You' and gained him prominence within the indie music culture in late 2013.

Everett has remixed for artists such as Tinashe and Usher. In 2014, he created the song "What We Want" for the video game Grand Theft Auto V. This song was included for the expanded soundtrack that was a part of the re-release of the game on PC, Xbox One, and PlayStation 4 systems. He headlined the San Francisco Noise Pop Festival in February 2013.

In 2015, Everett released the single "Red", about which he commented that "I was trying to express a feeling, and I got that more effectively".

He spent the majority of 2016 touring the U.S., playing notable festival gigs such as Shambhala Festival, Beach Goth, Mysteryland, and Ancient Future. He was also credited on Tory Lanez's 2016 single "Flex", featured on his album I Told You.

Samples from XXYYXX's tracks have been utilized by artists such as Chance the Rapper and SZA, and in 2017 Everett began producing additional music once more.

== Discography ==
=== Albums ===
- Still Sound (2011)
- XXYYXX (2012)

=== EPs, splits, and collaborations ===
- DOLOR (2012)
- Split EP (with Ruddyp) (2012)
- Mystify (2012)

=== Mixtapes ===
- Orange Soda (2012)

=== Singles ===
==== As lead artist ====
- "Angel" (2013)
- "Pay Attention" (2013)
- Unknown (feat Vanessa Elisha) (2015)
- "Red" (2015)
- "I Don't (feat. $K)" (2017)
- "You Are Why I Am Invisible, Pt 2"(2018)

==== As featured artist ====
- Giraffage - "Even Though" feat. XXYYXX (2012)

=== Remixes ===
- Tinashe – "Let You Love Me" (2012)
- Usher – "Climax" (2012)
- Troye Sivan – "Wild" (2015)
- SALES – "toto" (XXYYXX remix)

=== Credits ===
- Tory Lanez - Flex (2016)
- XXXTENTACION - Ecstasy (2014 & 2019)
