= Sarah Louise McIntosh =

Synthpop band

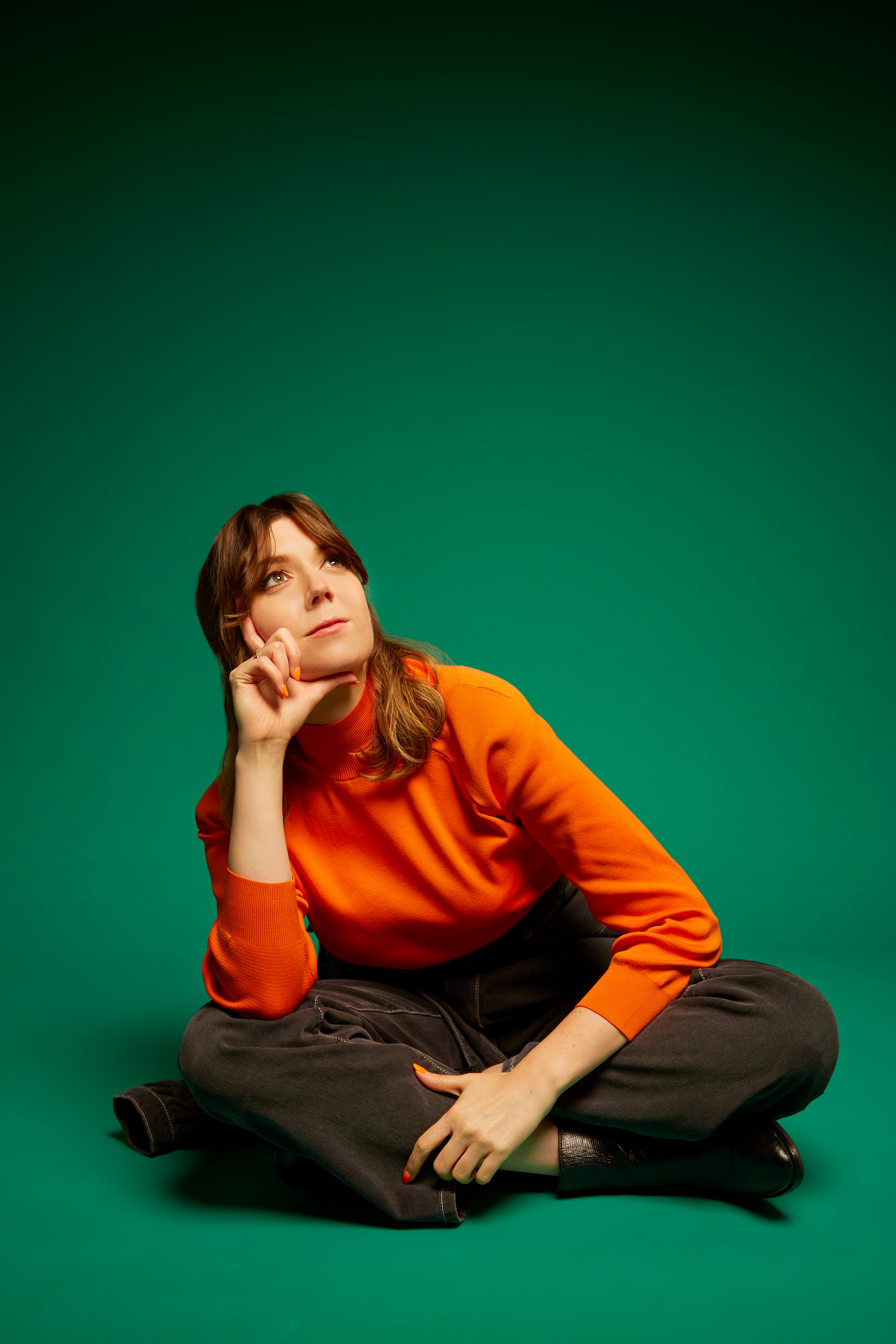

Background information
- Origin: Highclere, Hampshire, England
- Genre: Synthpop
- Years active: 2008–present
- Labels: Regal, Parlophone, Astralwerks
- Members: Sarah Louise McIntosh
- Past members: Hamish McIntosh; George Hinton
- Website: www.sarahlouisemcintosh.com

Sarah Louise McIntosh, formerly known as Sazzie, is an English synthpop solo act. Before going solo, McIntosh (born January 1991 in Highclere, Hampshire) was the keyboardist and lead singer/songwriter in the band The Good Natured with her brother Hamish McIntosh on bass and George Hinton (a university acquaintance) on drums. In between these projects, Sarah and her brother were known as Lovestarrs, and some Lovestarrs material has since been reissued under Sarah's name.

== Career ==
=== 2008–2011: Career beginnings, Warriors and Your Body Is a Machine ===
Sarah began playing the violin as a child, but felt it was not the right instrument for her, so she turned towards playing the drums. She also sang in a choir when she was a child. At the age of 14 she salvaged an old Yamaha keyboard while spring cleaning her grandmother's house. She taught herself to play the keys and at age 15 began to write her first own songs and founded a band with her brother Hamish. Later she went to university to study music, but found that both studying and pursuing her musical career was unmanageable. She therefore decided to drop out from university and concentrate on her own music.

After attracting thousands of listeners with their first song, "Our Very Last", The Good Natured self-released their debut EP Warriors on 7 July 2008. The EP received a lot of press coverage, especially for the lyrics. Their second EP Your Body Is a Machine was released independently as well on 13 September 2009.

=== 2011–2013: Parlophone, Skeleton and "5-HT" ===
In March 2011, The Good Natured signed a deal with Regal Recordings and Parlophone, under which they released their EP Skeleton on 20 June 2011. The lead track, "Skeleton" peaked at No. 68 on the German singles top 100. They also signed to Astralwerks in the United States, where they made their debut with the release of Skeleton on 11 October 2011. On 9 December 2012, The Good Natured released their debut single, "5-HT" with an accompanying music video. The song failed to make an impact on any major charts. Also in 2012, The Good Natured and Vince Clarke released the song Ghost Train as a free download.

On 28 March 2013, the band announced that their debut album would be titled Prism. However, on 25 July 2013, the group announced via their Facebook account that they had been dropped from their label a few months earlier, and had spent the ensuing time in an unsuccessful effort to get the masters back so that they could self-release the album. They also stated that the band's final show would be at the Temple of Boom stage at the Secret Garden Party that same month.

=== 2014–2017: Lovestarrs, Get Your Sexy On, Supernova, new EPs, and a debut album ===
On 4 December 2013, The Good Natured announced on their Facebook page that they will return in 2014 "in a new shape and form". In January 2014, they announced via their Facebook page that they had changed their name to Lovestarrs.

On 31 March 2014, Lovestarrs released their debut single, "Get Your Sexy On". The single received very positive reviews, especially from The Guardian who described the song as "excellent". In September 2014 under their new name, Lovestarrs self-released their first EP, Supernova. In support of this, they played shows in England and Sweden.

On 12 October 2015, Lovestarrs, now calling itself a pop duo after the departure of Hinton, began a Kickstarter campaign to fund production costs of two upcoming EPs and an album, Andromeda, Cassiopeia, and Planet Lovestarr, respectively, all set for release in 2016. Sarah stated that this was being done so as to retain ownership of their music and enable them to license and release it through DEFDISCO, the label they recently signed to, to avoid the issues that they had with Parlophone/EMI. The campaign was successful with 107% of their goal reached.

The Planet Lovestarr album was released 17 March 2017. Soon thereafter, the label folded and released all artists from their contracts.

Swedish pop impresarios Kristofer Östergren and Olle Blomström co-wrote and produced much of the Lovestarrs material, including "WTF", "Get Your Sexy On", and "Life is a Bitch".

=== 2017 – 2023: Sazzie ===
On 3 July 2017, Sarah posted on Facebook announcing a rebranding of Lovestarrs as Sazzie, a solo act. On 22 July 2017, Sarah announced her new name to be "Sazzie". That month, she released her first song as Sazzie to YouTube: a cover of Kesha's song "Praying". This was followed by "Hot Stuff", several other songs from the Planet Lovestarr album ("Get Your Sexy On", "Without You", "80's Love Song"), a lyrically reworked version of "WTF" called "WTF (Pop Culture)", and finally "London Town" in 2020.

=== 2024 – present: Sarah Louise McIntosh ===
In 2024, McIntosh rebranded yet again, this time under her real name, Sarah Louise McIntosh. In November, she released new material on the Femme Fatale digital EP, and in 2025 released a new song, "Dr Robotic", and two reissues, including the original "WTF".

== Influences ==
The Good Natured was compared to La Roux, Ladytron, Lily Allen and Kate Nash. Sarah herself described The Good Natured as "dark electronic pop" as well as "electronic pop with heart", citing bands such as Tears for Fears, Japan, Siouxsie and the Banshees and Vince Clarke (from Depeche Mode, Yazoo & Erasure) as influences.

Sarah stated that she is influenced by Katy Perry, Maroon 5 and Gwen Stefani when it comes to Lovestarrs.

== Discography ==
=== Albums ===
- The Good Natured – Prism (unreleased)
- Lovestarrs – Planet Lovestarr (2017)

=== Extended plays ===
- The Good Natured – Warriors (2008)
- The Good Natured – Your Body Is a Machine (2009)
- The Good Natured – Skeleton (2011)
- Lovestarrs – Supernova (2014)
- Lovestarrs – Get Your Sexy On (2016)
- Lovestarrs – Somebody Like You (2016)
- Sarah Louise McIntosh – Femme Fatale (2024)

=== Singles ===
- The Good Natured – "Be My Animal" (2010)
- The Good Natured – "Skeleton" (2011)
- The Good Natured – "Video Voyeur" (2011)
- The Good Natured & Colette Carr – "Christmas Wrapping" (2012)
- 5-HT (2013)
- The Good Natured – Lovers (2013)
- Lovestarrs – "Get Your Sexy On" (2014)
- Lovestarrs – "Stupid Cupid" (2014)
- Lovestarrs – "Ex Lover" (2014)
- Sazzie feat. Mix Master Mike – "Do You Work Out?" (2018)
- Sarah Louise McIntosh – "Get Your Sexy On" (2025 reissue of the Lovestarrs track)
- Sarah Louise McIntosh – "W.T.F" (2025 reissue of the Lovestarrs track "WTF")
- Sarah Louise McIntosh – "Dr Robotic" (2025)
