= Never Gonna Happen =

Single by Colette Carr

from the album Skitszo
- Released: March 5, 2013
- Recorded: 2013
- Genre: Pop rap; dance-pop
- Length: 3:12
- Label: Interscope Records, Cherrytree Records, N'Credible Entertainment
- Songwriter(s): Carr, M. Kierszenbaum, Fernando Garibay
- Producer(s): Garibay, Cherry Cherry Boom Boom

Colette Carr singles chronology
"Why Are You Leaving?" (2013)	"Never Gonna Happen" (2013)	"HAM" (2013)

"Never Gonna Happen" is a single by American pop music singer and songwriter Colette Carr. The song was written by Carr, Martin Kierszenbaum, and Fernando Garibay. It was produced by Garibay and Cherry Cherry Boom Boom. It was released on March 5, 2013, as the fifth single from her debut album, Skitszo. The official music video was released on April 5, 2013. It became Carr's most successful song.

== Composition ==
"Never Gonna Happen" was written by Carr, Cherry Cherry Boom Boom and Fernando Garibay. Garibay and Kierszenbaum also produced the song along with many other songs on Carr's debut album.

"Never Gonna Happen" is an up-tempo pop rap and dance-pop song. Carr said that this song talks about being in a [bad] relationship. She stated the line 'Seems to always end up to be the same, no matter whose fault I take the blame' means "that when your in an argument and you know the other one is wrong you take the blame so you can move on".

== Release and promotion ==
The song was first released on the "Skitszo (Part .3)" EP on March 5, 2013, and later included on Carr's debut album, Skitszo which was released July 9, 2013.

Carr performed the song live on her act in the "Turn Up The Love Tour" with Far East Movement in February 2013. The video was posted on the front page of Vevo's website for 24 hours. The video was also put up onto MTV's official website.

== Music video ==
The official music video for "Never Gonna Happen" was released April 6, 2013 on YouTube and Vevo. The video was directed by Mikey Easterling and produced by Talkboy TV. The video references the 1995 film, Clueless, with Carr wearing similar outfits to the characters in the movie.

== Track listing ==
International digital single

1. "Never Gonna Happen" (single release) - 3:12

Remix EP

1. "Never Gonna Happen" (Dave Audé Club Remix) - 7:49
2. "Never Gonna Happen" (Digital LAB Remix) - 6:53
3. "Never Gonna Happen" (DJ Lynnwood Radio Edit) - 4:00
4. "Never Gonna Happen" (Ron Reeser & Laroques Vocal Mix) - 5:34

== Charts ==
Chart (2013)	Peak position
US Dance Club Songs (Billboard)	11

== Credits and personnel ==
- Vocals - Colette Carr
- Producer - Garibay, Cherry Cherry Boom Boom
- Writer(s) - Carr, M. Kierszenbaum, Fernando Garibay
- Instruments - Garibay, M. Kierszenbaum
- Engineer - Tony Ugval
- Mix Engineer - Robert Orton
