= Reverie (Tinashe album) =

Mixtape by Tinashe
- Released: September 6, 2012
- Recorded: 2012
- Length: 42:22
- Label: Self-released
- Producers: Wes Tarte; BMarz of the Hills Club; Legacy; Nez & Rio; Best Kept Secret; B. Hendrixx; Troobadore; K-BeatZ; Daughter; XXYYXX

Tinashe chronology
In Case We Die (2012)	Reverie (2012)	Black Water (2013)

Singles from Reverie
- 1. "Stargazing" Released: August 21, 2012; 2. "Ecstasy" Released: December 18, 2012; 3. "Who Am I Working For?" Released: March 12, 2013

Reverie is the second mixtape by American singer Tinashe. It was released on September 6, 2012 via her official website. The mixtape follows her debut mixtape In Case We Die (2012), which came after a four-year stint as lead singer of girl group the Stunners and her array of non-album singles, including a collaboration with producers OFM, "Artificial People", in 2011. Reverie was preceded by three singles: "Stargazing", "Ecstasy", and "Who Am I Working For?".

As an executive producer, Tinashe enlisted a variety of musical producers to work with her on the mixtape, including Wes Tarte, BMarz of the Hills Club, Nez & Rio, Best Kept Secret, B. Hendrixx, Troobadore, K-BeatZ, Daughter, and XXYYXX. Besides being executive producer of the mixtape, Tinashe also wrote all of the mixtape's songs.

Reverie received positive reviews from music critics, who complimented the mixtape's "spacey beats and Middle Eastern influences", with some critics calling it highly anticipated and a must-listen, while praising Tinashe's vocals. Other critics compared the artistic style of the mixtape to that of Jhene Aiko, The Weeknd and Aaliyah. In addition, the album's title track was used during a scene of the American television program Love & Hip Hop.

== Background and release ==
On December 20, 2011, Tinashe announced that she would release a debut mixtape, titled In Case We Die, in 2012. After its release, Tinashe signed a record deal with RCA Records. On August 5, 2012, Tinashe announced that she was ready to release her second project, titled Reverie. The official cover art was revealed via Instagram on August 13. "Stargazing" was released as the lead single from the mixtape, on August 21.

== Development ==
Throughout the recording of the mixtape, Reverie was self-composed, engineered, and mastered entirely in Tinashe's bedroom. Even though she was an executive producer for the mixtape, Tinashe also worked with various producers from her first project, In Case We Die (2012), such as K-BeatZ, Wes Tarte and B. Hendrixx as well as new producers, BMarz of the Hills Club, Nez & Rio, Best Kept Secret, Troobadore, Roc & Mayne, JRB the Producer and XXYYXX.

== Music and packaging ==
According to Billboard's Ashley Lyle, "Stargazing" explores themes of "unrequited love", with Tinashe expressing a desire for emotional reciprocity.

The booklet opens with the mixtape's cover art, followed by pages that pair each track's lyrics with different photographs of the singer. Near its end, a "Thank You" section features Tinashe's acknowledgements, in which she notes that she "wrote and recorded Reverie by myself in my bedroom" and extends gratitude to her fans, collaborators, management team, family, and label staff. The booklet concludes with a final page listing the mixtape's tracks.

== Title ==
My second project, "Reverie", took a turn for the political. I notice that as the presidential election in the United States draws ever nearer, people become tremendously caught up in the Hollywood drama of it all — and automatically take on, without much consideration, all of the views and the opinions of "the right or the left". Thus, resulting in a disconnect from our real political duties as citizens of this Earth, and a neglect for the true issues human beings around the globe face every single day. We are so caught up in our media, in our jobs, in our gossip, and in our consuming that we genuinely feel like we don't have the time or energy to bother ourselves with the tribulations of nations near and far. This... is a synthetic world many of us live in today — a dream, if you will.

— via her official website, explaining the meaning behind the mixtape and its French title Reverie

Tinashe later elaborated on the conceptual direction of the mixtape and the choice of the French title Reverie, explaining that the project emerged from her growing awareness of political apathy and media saturation during the U.S. presidential election cycle. She reflected on how easily people absorbed the polarized rhetoric of "the right or the left" without deeper consideration, and how this distracted from global issues and the everyday responsibilities of citizenship. Tinashe emphasized that much of modern life is consumed by entertainment, work, gossip, and constant media intake, creating what she saw as a disconnect from real-world concerns.

As she summarized on her official blog, Reverie was shaped by observing a society "caught up in the Hollywood drama" of politics and detached from "the true issues human beings around the globe face every single day", concluding that many people live in "a synthetic world ... a dream, if you will".

== Critical reception ==
Reviews for Reverie were generally positive. The comments on DatPiff was positive, receiving promotional space on the main page of the site and peaking at number five on the most downloaded chart upon the first day of its release. It also drew comparisons to Aaliyah via fans on Twitter. MuuMuse noted "Stargazing" as "absolutely mesmerizing", and also compared her to indie band The xx. Global Grind called the tape "highly anticipated" as well as classifying it as a "must listen". Denver Sean of B. Scott noted "BMarz of the Hills Club's flawless production" of the first single, saying "'Stargazing', takes a similar approach to, Noah '40' Shebib's productions, but it's as if he strapped one to a rocket and shot it into the galaxy".

== Track listing ==
All tracks are written by Tinashe Kachingwe.

Reverie track listing
No.	Title	Producer(s)	Length
1.	"Fear Not"	Wes Tarte	2:33
2.	"Stargazing"	BMarz of the Hills Club	3:45
3.	"Yours"	Legacy	4:37
4.	"Slow"	Nez & Rio	4:28
5.	"Another Me"	Best Kept Secret	4:09
6.	"Come When I Call"	Wes Tarte	4:34
7.	"Illusions (Interlude)"	Tinashe	0:45
8.	"Reverie"	B. Hendrixx	3:57
9.	"I'm Selfish"	Troobadore	2:42
10.	"Ecstasy"	K-BeatZ	3:23
11.	"Who Am I Working For?"	Nez & Rio	3:47
12.	"Let You Love Me" (XXYYXX remix)	XXYYXX	3:48
Total length:			42:22

=== Notes ===
- Credits were adapted from digital booklet.
- Track 5 samples the song "Love" by Daughter.

== Release history ==
Region	Date	Format	Label	Ref.
Various	September 6, 2012	CD; digital download; streaming	Independent	
