= (We Do It) Primo =

Single by Colette Carr

from the album Skitszo
- Released: May 11, 2011
- Genre: Pop
- Length: 3:11
- Label: Interscope
- Songwriters: Colette Carr, Frankmusik
- Producer: Frankmusik

Colette Carr singles chronology
"(We Do It) Primo" (2011)	"Sex" (2011)

"(We Do It) Primo" is a song by American recording artist Colette Carr. The song was written by Carr, and produced by Frankmusik. "(We Do It) Primo" was released on May 11, 2011 by Interscope as the first single from Carr's debut album Skitszo. The song was written about just having fun and a good time. "(We Do It) Primo" is musically known as a "summer anthem" by many critics. It samples Keane's song "Somewhere Only We Know".

The song garnered mainly positive reviews from music critics. Many critics called it a "fun", "terrific" and "a summer anthem". "(We Do It) Primo" failed to become a commercial success, but it did gain Carr the number one spot on Billboard's "Uncharted Chart". A corresponding music video for "(We Do It) Primo" was directed by Nate Weaver. The purpose of the video was to introduce Carr to the public. The song was promoted through its music video being played on Teen Nick and MTV. The song is also the closing number of Carr's act in "The Cherrytree Pop Alternative Tour". The tour came to various different countries.

== Background and composition ==
The song was written by Carr, by herself. It was described by many as " a total summer track" and a "total party tune." It samples Keane's song, "Somewhere Only We Know". "(We Do It) Primo" was released internationally on May 11, 2011 as a CD single. "I wanted to cry of excitement. It's just the beginning," said Carr.

"(We Do It) Primo" is a pop song with a length of three minutes and thirty-four seconds. It is an uptempo number. The song has tempo of 114 beats per minute. "(We Do It) Primo" is heavy in synths Lyrically. "(We Do It) Primo" speaks of the just having fun, with the lyrics saying "We Do It Primo", with "Primo" meaning "Of top quality or importance". The bridge describes "doing it primo" by using various similes including: "sweeter than vanilla" and "slaying all of this like it was Christmas".

The song differs from Carr's previous songs. One main reason was that instead of her rap/singing style, she went for a more melodic song.

== Critical reception ==
"(We Do It) Primo" was met with mainly positive reviews. Freewired.com called it "an addictive summer-y beat The Prophet Blog gave the song a mixed review saying, "the hook is a total earworm" and called Carr "a badly dressed Ke$ha". He did, however called the song's melody "uplifting". Popjustice.com called it "various types of brilliant" TotallyVivid.com said that sampling a Keane song could but dangerous, but Primo " cleverly only uses the briefest of moments of the song, cherry-picking the catchiest hook of the chorus." MostlyJunkFood.com gave it 5 stars and called it "addictive". The song led Carr to be compared to various other women in the music industry, including Nicki Minaj, Ke$ha, Lady Gaga, Fergie, and Katy Perry.

== Chart performance ==
Despite being released internationally, "(We Do It) Primo" failed to chart. The song gained 250,000 song plays in its first week. This got Carr the top spot on Billboard's Uncharted Chart. "My fans got my back. I feel like I could put out a country album and they'd still support it," said Carr.

== Music video ==
The music video for "(We Do It) Primo" was directed by Nate Weaver. The video starts with Carr in her neighborhood, singing the song. In the background are different people riding bikes and skateboards. Frankmusik makes an appearance in the video as one of these people. Carr goes onto various green screens and different effects that represent the lyrics flash up on the screen. During the bridge of the song, Carr crawls through a white tent filled with glowing lights. Then, the tent closes and we see Carr open the curtain to a stage and is seen wearing a glittery body-suit, dancing with different background dancers behind her. After the dancers leave, Carr flashes two sparklers at the camera, while dancing. The video finishes with her blowing out the sparklers. The main purpose of the video was to introduce Carr and her unique style.

The video for "(We Do It) Primo" was premiered on Vevo on May 18, 2011. Colette Carr called the video "purposly sloppy". MusicIsMyKingSizeBed.com called the video "freshy fresh" and called Carr "a star in the making." Like the song, the video was given positive reviews. BestInNewMusic.com said "Dunno which I like better the song or the video!" BlastThatBoombox.com said that "There really is no storyline which doesn't even matter because the song doesn't need one. The ending was a nice twist with Colette going under bed sheets to her hip underground place."

During the summer season of 2011 the video was shown on commercial breaks on Teen Nick and MTV.

== Promotion ==
Before the song's release, Colette uploaded a 30-second preview to her YouTube channel, hoping it would attract people to buy the song. Carr performed the song as her closing number of her act at "The Cherrytree Pop Alternative Tour". The tour came to many countries including Canada and parts of Europe. Carr also did various internet and radio interviews for promotion. The music video for "Primo" was shown during commercial breaks on Teen Nick and MTV from June to September 2011.

== Formats and track listings ==
- CD
1. "(We Do It) Primo" – 3:12
- Digital EP
1. "(We Do It) Primo" (Jump Smokers Extended Remix) – 4:43
2. "(We Do It) Primo" (Alex Armes Remix) – 5:15
3. "(We Do It) Primo" (Dave Aude Remix) – 7:25
4. "(We Do It) Primo" (DJ Dan Remix) – 5:12
5. "(We Do It) Primo" (Ming Remix) – 4:14

== Chart performance ==
Chart (2011)	Peak position
US Uncharted Artist (Billboard)	13
