= Robby Blackwell =

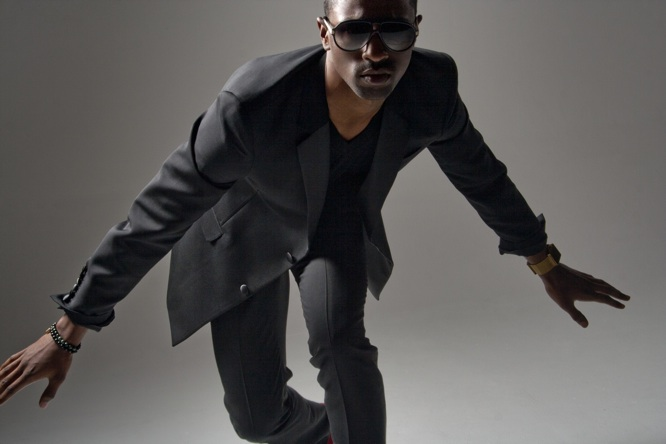

Background information
- Born: September 21, 1986 (age 39); Dallas, Texas, United States
- Genres: R&B
- Occupations: Singer-songwriter, musician, producer
- Years active: 2009–present
- Website: RobbyBlackwell.com

Robby Blackwell (born September 21, 1986, in Dallas, Texas) is an American singer-songwriter, producer, and instrumentalist. He released his first single, "Killer" in 2011, and co-founded the R&B/hip hop ensemble REDi in 2012.

== Biography ==
=== Early life ===
Robby Blackwell was born on September 21, 1985, and grew up in Dallas, Texas. The son of two teachers, he became involved with music at a young age – enrolling in choir, tap dance, hip hop, music production, piano and other instrument lessons. He credits Pink Floyd, Prince, Kanye West, Michael Jackson, and Usher as among his musical influences. He moved to Los Angeles after graduation to intern at Jive Records.

=== Career ===
Blackwell's single "Killer" was released in June 2011. Currently, he is working on an as-yet untitled EP. Previously he worked for Sony, going on to work with and perform with producer and guitarist Jon Redwine. In 2012 he joined Redwine, Rob. A!, and Aundrus Poole in co-founding REDi, an urban pop ensemble which has performed at South by Southwest in Austin, Texas and released one album.

== Discography ==
=== Singles ===
- 2011: "Killer" produced by Jon Redwine
- 2011: "Centerfold" produced by Jon Redwine
- 2011: "Balmain Bombshell" produced by Jon Redwine
- 2012: "Light the Club" with REDi produced by Jon Redwine

=== Albums ===
- 2012: Red Pill with REDi
