= Play House =

Single by Colette Carr

from the album Believe in Us
- Released: January 22, 2016
- Recorded: 2015
- Genre: Synth-pop
- Length: 3:25
- Label: Kawaii Nation
- Songwriters: Colette Carr; Cara Salimando; Vincent Turner
- Producer: Frankmusik

Colette Carr singles chronology
"Static" (2015)	"Play House" (2016)	"Believe In Us" (2017)

"Play House" is a single by American pop music singer and songwriter Colette Carr. It was released on January 22, 2016 as the second single from her second studio album, Believe in Us. The music video was released February 3, 2016. Lyrically the song talks about fantasizing about role playing with a love interest, having the perfect life "playing house".

== Background and composition ==
"Play House" was written by Carr, American singer-songwriter Cara Salimando and producer Frankmusik. It serves as the second single from Carr's second studio album Believe in Us which is scheduled to be released in 2017. "Play House" is a synth-pop song that talks about a fantasized relationship.

When interviewed by MTV, Carr talked about the song, saying "I am the girl that lives in her Pokémon pajamas, orders food in, works late and is scared of the concept of growing a human inside of me. When I wrote 'Play House,' it was about a boy that made me want to dress super-girly, cook for him and have tiny human babies with him! That was something I’d never felt before. So I decided to write a song about it."

== Music video ==
The music video for "Play House", which was directed by Shane Drake, was released on February 3 after being uploaded exclusively on MTV the day before. The music video has a 1950s theme. The video opens up with Carr's love interest pulling up to the house, being invited inside and when left alone, he starts to explore the house. Along the way he finds, two children dress similarly to him and Carr then witnessing Carr hacking away at something bloody and also being harassed by a red headed woman who looks similar to Carr. In the end, she convinces him that the things he was seeing was all in his head until it is revealed that Carr is the red headed woman in a wig.

== Release details ==
Region	Date	Label	Format
Europe	January 22, 2016	Kawaii Nation	Digital download
Worldwide	January 23, 2016	Kawaii Nation	Digital download
