= In Case We Die (Tinashe album) =

Mixtape by Tinashe
- Released: February 1, 2012
- Recorded: 2011–12
- Length: 52:38
- Label: Self-released
- Producers: B. Hendrixx; Wes Tarte; K-BeatZ; Yung Shaq; J. Mixx; Myles Morgan; Nic Nac

Tinashe chronology
In Case We Die (2012)	Reverie (2012)

Singles from In Case We Die
- 1. "Chainless" Released: December 20, 2011; 2. "My High" Released: January 30, 2012; 3. "This Feeling" Released: May 1, 2012; 4. "Boss" Released: August 14, 2012

In Case We Die is the debut mixtape by American singer Tinashe. It was first released on February 1, 2012, via her website, following a four-year stint as lead singer of girl group the Stunners and her array of non-album singles, including "Artificial People" (2011). As an executive producer, Tinashe enlisted a variety of musical producers including B. Hendrixx, Wes Tarte, K-BeatZ, Yung Shaq aka now PianoBoy, J. Mixx, Myles Morgan, Bobby Brackins and producing partner Nic Nac were involved as well.

In Case We Die was preceded by four singles: "Chainless", "My High", "This Feeling", and "Boss". It received positive reviews from music critics, who complimented the mixtape's subgenres and its "chilled vibe", with some critics calling it "brilliant" and praising the "production and introspective lyricism". Other critics compared the mixtape to the works of Kanye West, The Weeknd, Cassie, and Rihanna.

== Background ==
In 2007, after being approached by a singer Colleen "Vitamin C" Fitzpatrick, Tinashe joined girl group named the Stunners as the lead singer. After a four-year run, including opening for Justin Bieber on his My World Tour, the group disbanded in 2011. After being signed to Universal Republic Records with the Stunners, Tinashe began to independently release multiple solo singles including covers of Lil Wayne's single "How to Love", as well as a collaboration with production duo Orange Factory Music "Artificial People". On December 20, 2011, Tinashe announced that she would be releasing a mixtape entitled In Case We Die in 2012.

== Promotion ==
A promotional single from the mixtape entitled "Chainless" was released to iTunes on December 21, 2011. Tinashe clarified on Twitter that "Chainless" was a "fun, character [song], dedicated to the west", rather than an official single from the mixtape, on which it was later called a bonus track. The music video, directed by Bobby Brackins and Nic Nac, was released at midnight. It marks as the first video that Tinashe had not directed herself. On January 30, 2012, Tinashe revealed that the first official single from the mixtape would be "My High", and was released for streaming on her official website. A video was shot in early 2012, but never released. Tinashe re-shot the video the first week of June. The second single was later announced as "This Feeling" with a music video directed by Cole Walliser, shot in March. The music video was released on May 1, 2012. In an interview with Rosewood Radio on May 15, Tinashe confirmed that the video for "This Feeling" would be sent to BET's 106 & Park for play. She also confirmed that the next single from the mixtape would be "Boss".

== Critical reception ==
Reviews for the conceptual mixtape were generally positive. On DatPiff, it was the number one most downloaded mixtape on its release date. MuuMuse called the mixtape "brilliant" and said that it was "by far her most impressive moment yet – an incredible display of stone-cold serious artistry, featuring daring production and introspective lyricism that deserves to have the blogosphere going positively abuzz." Tinashe was compared to the likes of hip-hop heavyweight Kanye West, The Weeknd, Cassie, and pop star Rihanna.

GRAE New York called the mixtape "dreamy, seductive, and edgy", also comparing her to The Weeknd as well as Lana Del Rey. LozzaMusic noted that "it touches upon a lot of pop's subgenres, with quite a chilled vibe being present throughout." MTV Buzzworthy highlighted "Let You Love Me" and wrote that In Case We Die "demonstrates a vastly more mature ear than her age would suggest: Full of drippy beats, atmospheric noise and sexy croons echoing off in the distance, the mixtape recalls the moodiness of The Weeknd or Kanye West's My Beautiful Dark Twisted Fantasy – an incredibly impressive sound to achieve [...] One of the year's first truly exciting and creative releases".

== Track listing ==
All credits adapted from the included digital booklet.

In Case We Die track listing
No.	Title	Writer(s)	Producer(s)	Length
1.	"The Last Night on Earth"	Tinashe	J. Mixx	4:38
2.	"My High"	Tinashe	Yung Shaq	4:29
3.	"Let You Love Me"	Tinashe	K-BeatZ	4:12
4.	"That"	Tinashe	K-BeatZ	5:44
5.	"The Will to Survive (Interlude)"	Tinashe	Tinashe	0:37
6.	"Boss"	Tinashe	Legacy (of New Boyz)	3:41
7.	"I Tried"	Tinashe	Wes Tarte	4:35
8.	"Another Season"	Tinashe	B. Hendrixx	4:07
9.	"This Feeling"	Tinashe	B. Hendrixx	3:21
10.	"Stumble"	Tinashe	Wes Tarte	4:05
11.	"Crossing the Cosmo"	Tinashe	B. Hendrixx	3:47
12.	"Fading (Interlude)"	Tinashe	Tinashe	1:26
13.	"Biding My Time"	Tinashe	Myles Morgan	2:45
14.	"Heaven (Outro)"	Tinashe	Tinashe	2:09
15.	"Chainless" (bonus track)	Tinashe; Bobby Brackins	Nic Nac	3:11
Total length:				52:38

== Release history ==
Region	Date	Format	Label
Various	February 1, 2012	Digital download; streaming	Independent
