= 2 On =

Single by Tinashe featuring Schoolboy Q

from the album Aquarius
- Released: January 21, 2014
- Recorded: 2013
- Genre: R&B; snap
- Length: 3:47
- Label: RCA
- Songwriters: Tinashe Kachingwe; Bobby Brackins; Dijon McFarlane; Jon Redwine; Brendon Waters; Quincy Hanley; Cezar Cunningham; Sean Henriques; Steven Marsden; Delano Thomas; Michael Jarrett; Craig Serani Marsh
- Producers: DJ Mustard; Redwine; DJ Marley Waters

Tinashe singles chronology
| "2 On" (2014) | "Pretend" (2014) |

Schoolboy Q singles chronology
| "Break the Bank" (2014) | "2 On" (2014) | "Studio" (2014) |

"2 On" is the debut single by American singer Tinashe, released on January 21, 2014 as her first commercial single and the lead single from her debut studio album Aquarius (2014). The song features a guest verse from American rapper Schoolboy Q, songwriting credits from both artists alongside Bobby Brackins, and production from DJ Mustard, Jon Redwine, and DJ Marley Waters, who are also credited as songwriters. It also features an interpolation from the 2005 single "We Be Burnin'" by Jamaican rapper Sean Paul, resulting in additional writing credits for Cezar Cunningham, Sean Paul, Steven Marsden, Delano Thomas, Michael Jarrett, and Craig Serani Marsh.

An up-tempo R&B club and snap track that contains elements of electro and trap, the track is a party song with lyrics about living life to the fullest. Music critics mostly praised the song for its club-oriented sound and carefree lyrics, also noting it as a departure from Tinashe's murky alternative R&B that defined her previous songs. The single peaked at number 24 on the US Billboard Hot 100 and number one on US rhythmic radio, was the second-most played song of 2014 on the latter format, was certified four-times platinum by the RIAA, and was Tinashe's only appearance on the Billboard Hot 100 as a lead artist until the release of "Nasty" in 2024.

The accompanying music video for the track, directed by Hannah Lux Davis and released on March 24, 2014, features Tinashe dancing in several different scenes. To further promote the song, Tinashe made various live performances, including the SXSW Festival, the Power 106 LA concert, Capital Xtra, Rinse FM, V100.7/Milwaukee's Family Affair and The Wendy Williams Show. Canadian rapper Drake released an unofficial rework of the song to his SoundCloud account; the song consisted of two parts, the new version of "2 On" and "Thotful". An official Spanish remix featuring reggaeton singer Randy was released on November 18, 2014, and later included on his mixtape Under Doxis.

== Background ==
"2 On" has been described as nightclub-oriented, which contrasts with Tinashe's previous work such as her 2013 mixtape Black Water. She stated: "I wanted '2 On' to be transitional, so people get used to the idea of, 'She can make songs that can play on the radio, and she can still make songs that I can vibe out to in my car.'" "2 On" was released worldwide as a music download by RCA Records on January 21, 2014. Previously on June 11, 2012, Tinashe had tweeted "we on we on we on we on", which became the title of rapper Marcus Orelias's 2013 song "We On" featuring BJ the Chicago Kid and was part of the final line of the song's hook, hinting that she was inspired by "We On" to create "2 On", resulting in similar song titles. It debuted on both rhythmic contemporary and urban contemporary charts on March 18, 2014, and contemporary hit radio on July 30, 2014.

== Composition ==
"2 On"
A 23-second sample of "2 On" by Tinashe featuring Schoolboy Q, where the chorus is heard.

"2 On" is an R&B song, marking a slight departure from the murky alternative R&B from her mixtapes. The song features "effervescent keys", "synth-string accents", finger snaps, trap hi-hats, electro beats and distant chilly sighs, the latter which Bradley Stern of MuuMuse described as more reminiscent of her mixtape releases. The song features an interpolation of Sean Paul's 2005 single "We Be Burnin'", with the line "Just give me the trees and we can smoke it ya/Just give me the drink and we can pour it ya" featured in the middle eight. As a result, the song's writers (Cezar Cunningham, Sean Paul Henriques, Steven Marsden, Delano Thomas, Michael Jarrett, and Craig Serani Marsh) are credited. The song is written in the key of F♯ minor and has 101 beats-per minute.

Lyrically, the song is a carpe-diem anthem about being "super hyped up, super extra out on whatever emotion that it is." Explaining the concept of the meaning of "2 On", Tinashe clarified in an interview: "2 On is basically a new way of saying turn up. Being super hyped up with your friends when going out. I just wanted to come up with a fresh phrase that people can catch on to."

== Reception ==
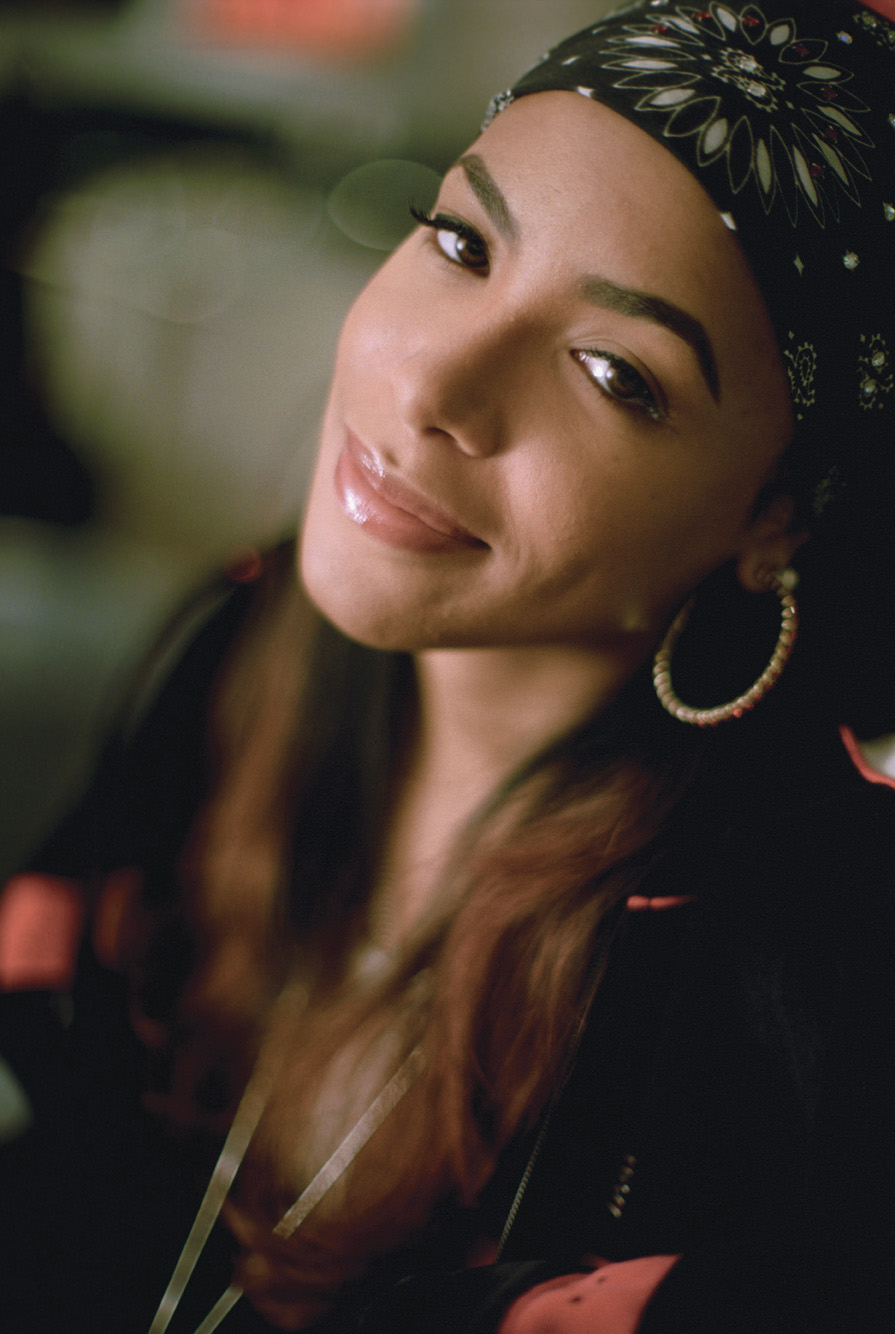
The song and its video were compared to the work of the late singer Aaliyah.

J. Leeds of the online publication Idolator praised the song's production calling it a "club thumper" and comparing the music video choreography to Britney Spears and Janet Jackson. Tom Breihan of Stereogum commented on the throwback feel from the track saying "2 On recreates some of the tropes of the late-’90s/early-’00s teenpop/R&B crossover era, but it does it within quotes" and also comparing the video having an Aaliyah vibe on it. Gotty, a writer for The Smoking Section, commented that "made me want to rollerskate. Maybe not as rhythmic and polished as Tip and them did in ATL but I could definitely hit the rink, do a little bop once I get some speed and cut the corners." Gotty also commended DJ Mustard's production, writing "it’s not necessarily what we’ve come to expect as his signature sound and that’s a good thing here."

Bradley Stern of MuuMuse classified the song as a "female version of Tyga‘s “Rack City" and 2 Chainz‘ "I’m Different" (both also produced by Mustard) mixed with the icy flow of Cassie's "Me & U," blending #TurnUp club culture (TURN DOWN FOR WHAT?!) with hypnotic minimal beats – it's all sorts of sexy." Jon Ali, in his blog, appraised the song as "a hot slow-burning R&B number packed with an icy electro beat and a infectious chorus loaded with plenty of memorable sexual come-ons. The song works so well in its simplicity" and the sample used as "all sorts of perfect." A writer for Fact Magazine opined that "Tinashe and Mustard are a surprisingly potent pairing, but we hoped rappers would leave the “beat the pussy up" schtick in the bin." John Kennedy of Billboard noted that "ScHoolboy Q's rambunctious bars give this feel-good smash just the right amount of scruffiness." "2 On" was labeled an album highlight by several critics.

Pitchfork named "2 On" as one of the 200 best songs of the decade, praising the track as "widescreen and intricately sculpted: its curling, high-toned bassline seems to whir and chime, and its descending roll of pizzicato synth-drums are so ear-catching that they compete with the gorgeous vocal melody. [...] Tinashe’s sensuous, slurred lingering over the chorus “I luuuuu to get 2 on" is joyous and life-affirming, a million miles from the deadened hedonism of so much trap. Dissolution has never sounded so delicious".

Following its release the song has peaked at number 24 on the Billboard Hot 100, number 53 on the UK Singles Chart and stayed at number one for four weeks on the Billboard Rhythmic Charts. As of August 8, 2014, "2 On" has sold 473,000 downloads in the US. On June 16, 2025 the song was certified four-times Platinum by RIAA for selling 4,000,000 copies. The song also reached the top forty in Australia.

== Accolades ==
Awards and nominations for "2 On"
| Award | Year | Category | Result | Ref. |
|---|---|---|---|---|
| Soul Train Music Awards | 2014 | Best Dance Performance | Nominated | |
| BMI R&B/Hip-Hop Awards | 2015 | Most Performed R&B/Hip-Hop Songs | Won | |

== Promotion ==
The song's official music video, directed by Hannah Lux Davis, was released on March 24, 2014. One of the songwriters, Bobby Brackins, makes a cameo. Speaking about the choreography, handled by JaQuel Knight, in the video, Tinashe listed Michael Jackson, Janet Jackson and Britney Spears as her inspirations, "I was always super frustrated when people stopped dancing in their videos because I thought that was such a great part of it. I really want to bring that back."

Tinashe first performed the song at SXSW Festival 2014. Also, at the Power 106 LA concert, Capital Xtra, Rinse FM, V100.7/Milwaukee's Family Affair, The Vipor Room and Hot 97's Who's Next. Drake also invited her on stage to perform the remix to the song in Houston. Tinashe performed the song on The Wendy Williams Show on July 21, 2014.

== Cover versions ==
On May 12, 2014, OB O'Brien posted an unofficial rework of the song to his SoundCloud account, featuring vocals from Drake. The song consists of two parts, the new version of "2 On" and "Thotful". The song begins with O'Brien singing a verse before Drake takes over. The cover transitions into "Thotful", the second part of the song which according to a writer for Rap-Up magazine "toasts to the thots." The remix also features references to Wu-Tang and Flipmode and in regards to its production, J. Tinsley of The Smoking Section called it "an updated version of what a So Far Gone 2 would sound like." Reviews were positive towards Drake's take on the song. Chris DeVille of Stereogum called the track "an entertainingly moody passive-aggressive R&B/hip-hop mash the likes of which Drake patented sometime around late 2009." Jesse James of StupidDOPE lauded it as "dope showcasing of depth and lyrical prowess," adding that it "shall be heard in a number of rides, clubs, and much more very soon." Samantha Nelson of Examiner.com called his verse "classic Drake", deeming it a "smart take on the title of the song but makes it more dramatic" and that it "will please all of his fans." Recording artist and rapper Brooke Candy released an unofficial remix on her SoundCloud on June 17, 2015. It reached more than 8 million plays in the platform.

== Credits and personnel ==
Locations and sample

- Mixed at Larrabee Sound Studios, North Hollywood, California
- Contains elements of "We Be Burnin'", performed by Sean Paul and written by Cezar Cunningham, Sean Paul, Steven Marsden, Delano Thomas, Michael Jarrett and Craig Serani Marsh.

Personnel

- Songwriting – Bobby Brackins, Tinashe Kachingwe, Dijon "DJ Mustard" McFarlane, Jon Redwine, Brendon Waters, Quincey "Schoolboy Q" Hanley, Cezar Cunningham, Sean Paul, Steven Marsden, Delano Thomas, Michael Jarrett and Craig Serani Marsh
- Production – Dijon "DJ Mustard" McFarlane, Redwine, DJ Marley Waters
- Mixing – Jaycen Joshua, Ryan Kaul (assistant)

== Charts ==
=== Weekly charts ===
| Chart (2014–2015) | Peak position |
|---|---|
| Australia (ARIA) | 29 |
| Belgium (Ultratip Bubbling Under Flanders) | 38 |
| Belgium Urban (Ultratop Flanders) | 23 |
| Canada Hot 100 (Billboard) | 74 |
| Canada CHR/Top 40 (Billboard) | 46 |
| France (SNEP) | 180 |
| UK Singles (OCC) | 127 |
| UK Hip Hop/R&B (Official Charts) | 14 |
| US Billboard Hot 100 | 24 |
| US Hot R&B/Hip-Hop Songs (Billboard) | 5 |
| US R&B/Hip-Hop Airplay (Billboard) | 5 |
| US Pop Airplay (Billboard) | 22 |
| US Rhythmic Airplay (Billboard) | 1 |

=== Year-end charts ===
| Chart (2014) | Position |
|---|---|
| US Billboard Hot 100 | 65 |
| US R&B/Hip-Hop Airplay (Billboard) | 17 |
| US Hot R&B/Hip-Hop Songs (Billboard) | 15 |
| US Rhythmic (Billboard) | 2 |

== Certifications ==
| Region | Certification | Certified units/sales |
|---|---|---|
| Australia (ARIA) | Platinum | 70,000^{‡} |
| Canada (Music Canada) | Gold | 40,000^{‡} |
| Denmark (IFPI Danmark) | Gold | 45,000^{‡} |
| New Zealand (RMNZ) | 3× Platinum | 90,000^{‡} |
| United Kingdom (BPI) | Platinum | 600,000^{‡} |
| United States (RIAA) | 4× Platinum | 4,000,000^{‡} |
^{‡} Sales+streaming figures based on certification alone.

== Release history ==
| Country | Date | Format | Label | Ref. |
|---|---|---|---|---|
| Worldwide | January 21, 2014 | Digital download | RCA Records | |
| United States | March 18, 2014 | Rhythmic contemporary | RCA Records | |
| United States | March 18, 2014 | Urban contemporary | RCA Records | |
| United States | July 30, 2014 | Contemporary hit radio | RCA Records | |
