= Jon Redwine =

American record producer

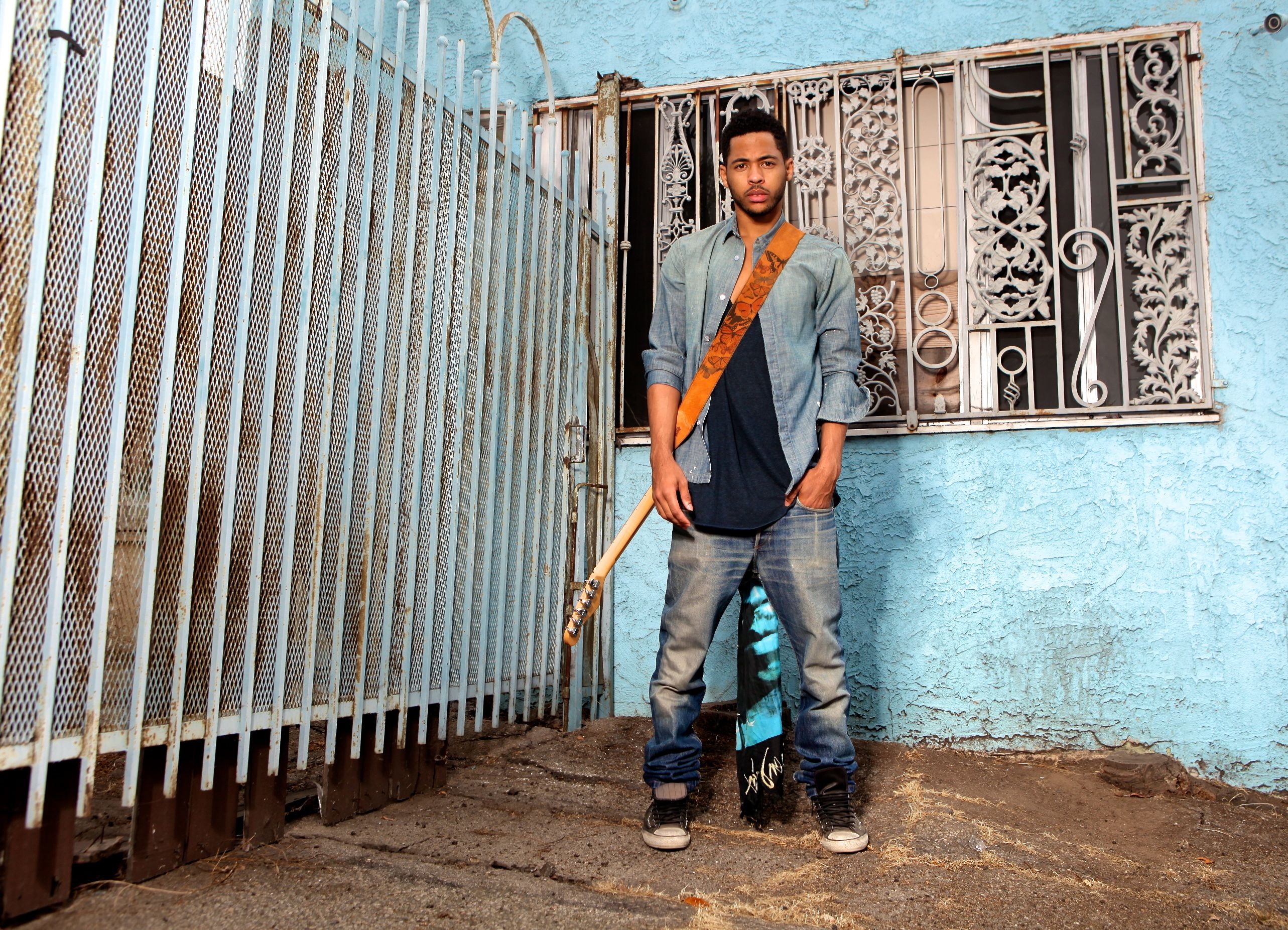
- Redwine in 2013

Background information
- Also known as: Redwine, Redwxne
- Born: Oak Cliff, Texas, U.S.
- Genres: Hip hop, R&B
- Occupation: Record producer
- Instruments: Guitar; tuba; piano; bass; percussion
- Years active: 2003–present
- Label: RED Sound
- Website: redtherockstar.com

Jon Redwine (born in Oak Cliff, Texas) is an American record producer. He is best known for his co-production on Tinashe's 2014 single "2 On", which peaked at number 24 on the Billboard Hot 100 and received 4x platinum certification by the Recording Industry Association of America (RIAA). He has also been credited on songs and albums by other artists including Chris Brown, Bobby Brackins, G-Eazy, Zendaya, Waka Flocka Flame, Mario, Jeremih, Colette Carr, MKTO, and Jake Miller.

== Early life, education ==
Born in the late 1980s, Jon Redwine was raised by his parents in Oak Cliff, Texas. He came from a musical background, as the great nephew of Don Albert and early on listened to musicians such as Marvin Gaye, Donny Hathaway, Jimmy Scott, and Duke Ellington. He later began listening to bands such as Confunkshun and Kanye West. He first started taking music seriously at age 13 as a DJ.

Redwine attended the University of St. Thomas in Saint Paul, Minnesota from 2004 to 2008 on a full academic scholarship, where he earned a bachelor's degree in electronic music production and business entrepreneurship. He also attended the University of Minnesota during the same time period where he gained membership into Alpha Phi Alpha fraternity. He started writing earnestly again as a sophomore in college, after deciding to focus on the interest he took most personally.

== Music career ==
=== Production ===
Redwine became CFO, owner, and founder of Ten|82 in 2006, while still attending college. He also co-founded the production team 2085, which consists of Redwine and fellow Oak Cliff native Robby Blackwell. After graduation, Redwine moved to Los Angeles with no funding, and soon started operating a production studio in Santa Monica.

His songwriting and production work covers multiple genres. Redwine was classically trained in college, and his work is typically based on live instruments with a heavy focus on synths and guitars. Beginning in January 2012, he worked as a producer for Warner Music Group, and has also done production for Sony Music Entertainment, Def Jam, and Disney. He also became owner of FLYP'T Technologies in May 2009. The company produces iFlyp't, an iPhone app that allows fans to experience recording with particular artists.

=== REDi ===
Redwine became a founding member of REDi (pronounced red-eye) in 2012 in Los Angeles. The urban pop ensemble includes Redwine, Robby Blackwell, and rapper Aundrus Poole. The members met as collaborators with Redwine, and according to Blackwell: "We were all working with Redwine and respected each other's music...so it just made sense for us to further our collaborations with a group."

The group made their debut performance in March 2012 at SXSW in Austin, Texas,. where they performed after groups such as Dawn Richard and 9th Wonder. They released their debut single "Light the Club" in May 2012, and their debut mixtape, Red Pill, was released in November 2012. It was produced by Redwine.

== Discography ==
=== Albums ===
- Use to Love by Mario (Unreleased Album)
- 2012: Red Pill with REDi
- 2012: Visitor Mixtape by V. Bozeman – production
- 2012: Triple F Life by Waka Flocka Flame – production
- 2013: Rockabyebaby mixtape by Cassie Ventura – Worked vocally on production

=== Singles ===
- 2010: ""Fever" from ''Fresh by Tabi Bonney ft Raheem Devaguhn
- 2010: "The Come Up" from ''Fresh by Tabi Bonney
- 2010: "Nuthin but a Hero" from ''Fresh by Tabi Bonney
- 2012: "Candy Paint and Gold Teeth" by Waka Flocka ft Ludacris and BunB
- 2012: "Light the Club" with REDi
- 2012: "Poison" by Veronika Bozeman
- 2012: "Time to get sexy" by Veronika Bozeman
- 2012: "Feelin on your booty" by Veronika Bozeman
- 2012: "Knockin the Boots" by Veronika Bozeman
- 2013: "Ham" by Colette Carr
- 2014: "2on" by Tinashe ft School Boy Q
- 2014: "Jersey" by Bella Thorne
- 2014: "Hot Box" by Bobby Brackins ft G-Eazy and Mila J
- 2014: "Came to Do" by Chris Brown ft Akon
- 2015: "Post to Be" performed by Omarion, Chris Brown, and Jhené Aiko
- 2015: "Tumbao" by Kat Dahlia,
- 2015: "Ain't Bout To Do" by Diggy Simmons ft French Montana
- 2015: "My Jam" by Bobby Brackins ft Jeremih and Zendaya,
- 2015: "Selfish Girls" by Jake Miller
- 2015: "Blood on My Hands" by Chris Brown,
- 2016: "Lost My Way" by Max Schneider
- 2016: "Hands Off My Heart/Places You Go" by MKTO
- 2016: "Bang Bang" by Tabi Bonney ft Wiz Khalifa

== See also ==
- REDi
