= Colette Carr =

American singer (born 1991)

- Born: Colette Mary Carr; January 6, 1991 (age 35); Los Angeles, California, U.S.
- Genres: Pop-rap; electropop; synth-pop
- Occupations: Singer, rapper
- Years active: 2008–present
- Labels: Cherrytree, Interscope, Ncredible, Kawaii Nation
- Website: colettecarr.com

Colette Mary Carr (born January 6, 1991) is an American singer. Her debut album, Skitszo, a collection of previously released digital EPs, was released in 2013. Her single "Never Gonna Happen" reached the number eleven spot on Billboard's Dance-Club Chart. Carr's musical style has been compared to Dev and Little Boots.

== Early life ==
Carr grew up in Malibu, California. She has one older sister named Nicole. Carr played competitive tennis, training for the Olympics, but the activity reduced the cartilage in her spine, and she was told by a doctor never to play again. She listened to hip hop music in her teens. She learned to rap freestyle, participating in battle raps at parties.

== Career ==
=== 2009–2010: Career beginnings and Sex Sells Stay Tooned ===
Discovered at a Game concert, Carr volunteered to go on stage when host comedian Story Moyd, asked the audience if anyone could freestyle. The audience reacted positively to Carr, screaming "Go white girl". Carr gained the attention of the audience, and various producers, including the Cataracs, who produced various songs for her. Carr released her debut single, "Back It Up" in 2009, which quickly became a viral success. The music video, directed by Richie Mac, received more than 465,000 views on MTV Music networks MTVU channel, charting top 10 video of the week. When Carr's self-produced video, "Back It Up", went to No. 1 at MTVU, it attracted the attention of Nick Cannon, who helped Colette release her debut mix tape, "Sex Sells Stay Tooned"" through his NCredible Entertainment label.

In 2010, Carr released promotional single "Bitch Like Me", accompanied with video directed by Jonathan Singer-Vine, and her first mix-tape "Sex Sells Stay Tooned", with over 100,000 downloads in its first few months.

=== 2011–2014: Skitszo ===
Interscope boss Jimmy Iovine signed Colette and sent her to the recording studio for her debut album, Skitszo, which produced the Billboard Dance hit, "Never Gonna Happen" and the Billboard Uncharted topper, "(We Do It) Primo", working with producers such as RedOne (Lady Gaga). The lead single, "(We Do It) Primo", was released on May 11, 2011. It reached the number-one spot on Billboard's Uncharted chart for artists whose music is primarily distributed online. Carr was included on the CherryTree Pop Alternative Tour along with LMFAO, Far East Movement, Frankmusik, and Natalia Kills.

Carr released four digital EPs, "Skitszo" parts 1–4, which consisted of songs from her debut album that had been split into four. Carr's debut album "Skitszo Collection" was released as a whole on July 9, 2013, through Interscope, which included parts 1–4 and four additional songs. "Never Gonna Happen" was the album's fifth single, released on March 5, and a remix by Dave Aude appeared on Billboard's Hot Dance Club Songs chart at No. 11.

Colette then released "HAM" featuring Ben J from Hip Hip duo New Boyz, co-written by Nate Walka and Jon Redwine, and produced by Marley Waters. Carr released and premiered the music video for "HAM" on popular American radio personality, television host, and producer Ryan Seacrest's site RyanSeacrest.com on September 13, 2013. Carr toured along with Huey Mack and Mayo on the "Pretending Perfection" tour and then toured for the "On the Rise" tour, along with Jake Miller, Becky G, T. Mills, and Mike Stud.

=== 2015–present: Believe in Us and Tiki Lau ===
In January 2015, Carr announced that she was working on her second studio album Believe in Us, due to be released in late 2017. The majority of the album has been written and produced with Carr's frequent collaborator Frankmusik. Like her previous album, Believe in Us will be split into EPs with the full album being released as a whole later.

The first EP of "Believe in Us", Static.Start., was released on June 23, 2015, on Kawaii Nation. The EP includes Carr's lead single from her album, "Static".

A second single from the album, named "Play House" was released on January 22, 2016, with the music video released on February 3, 2016.

A third long-awaited single from the album, named "Believe in Us" was released on October 27, 2017. By 2020, the album has been scrapped with no new information about the album being released.

In 2019, Carr came together with her fiancé and DJ and producer Naka to form a music group Tiki Lau. They released a single called “Mike Tyson” which charted at number 3 on Billboard's “Top Triller U.S.” on December 12, 2020. American Boxer Mike Tyson, who the song is named after, used the song as his walkout theme for his comeback fight against Roy Jones Jr.

== Personal life ==
Carr is an oil painter who combines abstract atmosphere with recognizable figures. She has often painted herself with makeup before a concert.

Carr announced on September 2, 2018, via Instagram that she was engaged.

== Discography ==
- Skitszo (2013)

== Concerts ==
Co-headlining tours

- The CherryTree Pop Alternative Tour (2011)
- Pretending Perfection (2014)
- On the Rise Tour (2014)
