= Match My Freak: World Tour =

2024–2025 concert tour by Tinashe

- World tour by Tinashe
- Promotional poster for the tour
- Location: Asia; Australia; Europe; North America
- Associated album: Quantum Baby
- Start date: October 14, 2024
- End date: September 6, 2025
- Legs: 5
- No. of shows: 48
- Supporting acts: Raveena; Becca Hatch; Lyvia

Tinashe concert chronology
- BB/Ang3l Tour (2024); Match My Freak: World Tour (2024–2025); Three Nights With a Popstar Tour (2026)

The Match My Freak: World Tour was the fifth concert tour by American singer Tinashe, in support of her seventh studio album, Quantum Baby (2024). It began on October 14, 2024, in Anaheim with shows across North America, Asia and Europe. It concluded in Chengdu on September 6, 2025, comprising 48 shows. While Raveena and various DJs served as the opening act for the North American leg, Becca Hatch served as the opening act for the Australian leg and Lyvia for the European leg. The set list featured majority of the songs from Quantum Baby, including her previous hit singles such as "2 On" and "All Hands on Deck". It also contained "The Worst in Me", a duet with Kaytranada, and "Party Flavors", with Young Thug.

== Background ==
On August 6, 2024, Tinashe formally announced the tour, with 23 shows across North America from October through November. Tickets went on sale on August 9, with a presale that ran from August 7 until August 8. Tinashe noted that her upcoming tour promises to be an entirely new experience even for repeat attendees, stating that fans can expect "high energy, brand new choreography, new songs, obviously". On October 7, Tinashe announced European and Japanese dates for the tour, expanding the tour with 9 shows across Europe and Asia. Tickets went on sale on October 11, for the European dates, and on October 16, for the Japan dates. On November 2, Tinashe announced Australian headline dates for the tour. Tickets went on sale on November 6. On May 8, 2025, Tinashe announced more Asian dates for the tour. Tickets went on sale on May 15.

== Critical reception ==
Juliana George of Boston.com, who attended the show at the MGM Music Hall at Fenway, concluded that, "Of course, the night ended how the summer began: with a high-energy, provocative rendition of "Nasty" that everyone could sing along to". Reviewing the Chicago stop at the Aragon Ballroom, Britt Julious from the Chicago Tribune praised the show as "a tightly constructed, visually sumptuous hour-long set", suggesting that the performance "felt, at times, designed to get audiences in and out of the venue" with some songs moving too quickly to fully resonate. Nonetheless, he concluded that the concert was "so great and fun that it made me want more". Joey Guerra of the Houston Chronicle, who attended the show at the Bayou Music Center, noted that Tinashe "commands it all with ease. She locks in effortlessly with her dancers and knows when to make it all about her. If everyone else would just catch up, she'd have the rest of the girls on high alert". Sean Thomas of the Houston Press, who also attended the show at the Bayou Music Center, noted that it "featured all of Tinashe's latest hits, including "No Broke Boys," "All my Friends" and a ton of dancing. She thanked her fans for sharing their energy with her and blew them all kisses on the way out". Monowara Hossain of Mxdwn, who attended the show at Greek Theatre, noted that Tinashe's voice "was a magnificent showcase of her talent and charisma. With her powerful voice, dynamic choreography, and genuine connection with the audience, she demonstrated why she is a standout artist in today's music scene."

== Set list ==
The following set list is obtained from the October 14, 2024 show in Anaheim. It is not intended to represent all dates throughout the tour.

1. "Getting No Sleep"
2. "When I Get You Alone"
3. "Needs"
4. "Link Up"
5. "Bouncin'"
6. "Bouncin', Pt. 2"
7. "Thirsty"
8. "Red Flags"
9. "The Worst in Me"
10. "Throw a Fit"
11. "Talk to Me Nice"
12. "X"
13. "Unconditional"
14. "Party Favors"
15. "All Hands on Deck"
16. "2 On"
17. "Cross That Line"
18. "Uh Huh"
19. "Gravity"
20. "No Broke Boys"
21. "Nasty"

=== Notes ===
- Starting with the show in Los Angeles, "Save Room for Us" was added to the set list after "The Worst In Me".

== Tour dates ==
List of 2024 concerts, showing date, city, country, venue, opening acts
Date (2024)	City	Country	Venue	Opening act
October 14	Anaheim	United States	House of Blues	Raveena
October 15	San Diego	United States	SOMA	Raveena
October 17	Los Angeles	United States	Greek Theatre	Raveena
October 20	Phoenix	United States	The Van Buren	Raveena
October 22	Dallas	United States	South Side Ballroom	Raveena
October 23	Austin	United States	Stubb's Waller Creek Amphitheater	Raveena
October 24	Houston	United States	Bayou Music Center	Raveena
October 26	Atlanta	United States	Coca-Cola Roxy	Raveena
October 28	Nashville	United States	Marathon Music Works	Raveena
October 30	North Myrtle Beach	United States	House of Blues	Raveena
October 31	Raleigh	United States	The Ritz	Raveena
November 1	Washington, D.C.	United States	The Anthem	Raveena
November 3	Wallingford	United States	Dome at Toyota Oakdale Theatre	Raveena
November 4	Brooklyn	United States	Brooklyn Paramount Theater	Raveena
November 6	Boston	United States	MGM Music Hall at Fenway	Raveena
November 10	Montreal	Canada	M Telus	Raveena
November 11	Toronto	Canada	Rebel	Raveena
November 13	Chicago	United States	Aragon Ballroom	Raveena
November 14	Minneapolis	United States	The Fillmore Minneapolis	Raveena
November 18	Seattle	United States	The Showbox	Raveena
November 22	Portland	United States	Roseland Theater	Raveena
November 24	San Francisco	United States	Warfield Theatre	Raveena
November 25	Sacramento	United States	Ace of Spades	Raveena

List of 2025 concerts, showing date, city, country, venue, opening acts
Date (2025)	City	Country	Venue	Opening act
January 4 (Note: Part of the Wildlands Festival.)	Joondalup	Australia	Arena Joondalup	—N/a
January 5	Adelaide	Australia	Ellis Park	—N/a
January 7	Melbourne	Australia	Forum Theatre	Becca Hatch
January 8	Sydney	Australia	Enmore Theatre	Becca Hatch
January 14	Osaka	Japan	Namba Hatch	—N/a
January 15	Tokyo	Japan	Toyosu PIT	—N/a
February 13	Copenhagen	Denmark	Vega	Lyvia
February 16	Berlin	Germany	Astra Kulturhaus	Lyvia
February 18	Utrecht	Netherlands	TivoliVredenburg	Lyvia
February 20	Cologne	Germany	Live Music Hall	Lyvia
February 21	Paris	France	Élysée Montmartre	Lyvia
February 23	London	England	O_{2} Academy Brixton	Lyvia
February 25	Dublin	Ireland	3Olympia Theatre	Lyvia
August 16 (Note: Part of the Summer Sonic Festival.)	Osaka	Japan	Expo Commemoration Park	—N/a
August 17	Tokyo	Japan	Makuhari Messe	—N/a
August 19	New Taipei City (Note: Labeled as Taipei in promotional material.)	Taiwan	Zepp New Taipei	—N/a
August 21	Singapore		Capitol Theatre	—N/a
August 24 (Note: Part of the LaLaLa Festival.)	Jakarta	Indonesia	Jakarta International Expo	—N/a
August 26	Seoul	South Korea	Bluesquare SOL Travel Hall	—N/a
August 30	Shanghai	China	Echo Land Music Park	—N/a
September 2	Nanjing	China	1701 Live House	—N/a
September 5	Foshan	China	Nanhai Sports Center	—N/a
September 6	Chengdu	China	Qiao Music Camp	—N/a
