= Quantum Baby =

Studio album by Tinashe
- Released: August 16, 2024
- Studio: Tinashe's home studio (Los Angeles)
- Genre: Alternative R&B
- Length: 22:05
- Labels: Tinashe Music; Nice Life
- Producers: John Alexis; Billy Lemos; Liohn; Nosaj Thing; Jorgen Odegard; Phoelix; Ricky Reed; Sdtroy; Zack Sekoff; Z3N

Tinashe chronology
BB/Ang3l (2023)	Quantum Baby (2024)	Popstar (2026)

Singles from Quantum Baby
- 1. "Nasty" Released: April 12, 2024; 2. "Getting No Sleep" Released: June 28, 2024; 3. "No Broke Boys" Released: October 18, 2024

Quantum Baby is the seventh studio album by American singer Tinashe. It was released on August 16, 2024, through her independent label, Tinashe Music Inc., and Nice Life Recording Company. The album is a sequel album to BB/Ang3l (2023), and was recorded at Tinashe's home studio in collaboration with producers including Nosaj Thing, Billy Lemos, and Ricky Reed.

Inspired in part by Janet Jackson's song "Empty", Quantum Baby is an experimental R&B album that blends elements of pop, R&B, and trap, and explores themes of duality, self-exploration, and the balance between confidence and vulnerability. Its music ranges from atmospheric, Brandy-inspired ballads to bass-driven dance tracks, with critics noting its genre-blurring production and Tinashe's dynamic vocal performance.

With eight tracks, Quantum Baby includes three singles: "Nasty", "Getting No Sleep", and "No Broke Boys". The album was supported by the Match My Freak: World Tour across North America, Europe, and the UK. It received generally positive reviews for its concise structure, stylistic diversity, and continuation of the artist's conceptual trilogy. Quantum Baby reached number 199 on the US Billboard 200 and number 23 on the US Top R&B Albums chart. The album and its lead single, "Nasty", were also featured on several year-end lists by publications including People, Paper, Time, and Rolling Stone.

== Background and recording ==
Quantum Baby is about getting to know me on a deeper level [...] It's about exploring who I am as a person and who I am as an artist. I've never been one to be put into a box, so the name 'Quantum Baby' encompasses all the different parts that make up who I am as a creative.

— Tinashe talking about the album's theme and meaning of the title

On April 3, 2024, it was announced Tinashe signed a worldwide publishing deal with Position Music, obtaining the publishing rights to her future releases from that point forward and her previous album BB/Ang3l (2023). Marking as the second part of trilogy which began with BB/Ang3l, Quantum Baby was described as a project centered on deeper self-exploration, highlighting that the album reflects both her personal growth and the multidimensional nature of her artistry. In a press release, she stated that she has "never been one to be put into a box", noting that the title Quantum Baby as a title that encompasses all the different parts of who she is as a creative.

In an interview with Elle, Tinashe expanded on the meaning behind the album's title, explaining that being a "quantum baby" symbolizes the dualities she is embracing at this stage in her life—"living in this catch-22 between being very strong and also being very vulnerable". In another interview, she drew inspiration from the "quantum" paradox—how things become contradictory when examined at their smallest scale—and she related this idea to the conflicting elements within her own creative process. She highlighted that the album intentionally balances confidence and vulnerability, using this contrast to explore the opposing forces that define her artistic perspective.

Quantum Baby was recorded at Tinashe's home studio. During the recording, she collaborated with experimental producers including Nosaj Thing, Machinedrum, and Billy Lemos. She noted that these producers encouraged creative risk-taking and exploration, as they "embody that freedom" and were "unafraid" to try new approaches. Tinashe further explained that she maintained an open approach at the start of an album, welcoming collaboration and diverse directions, which resulted in strong synergy with her team.

== Composition ==
=== Music ===
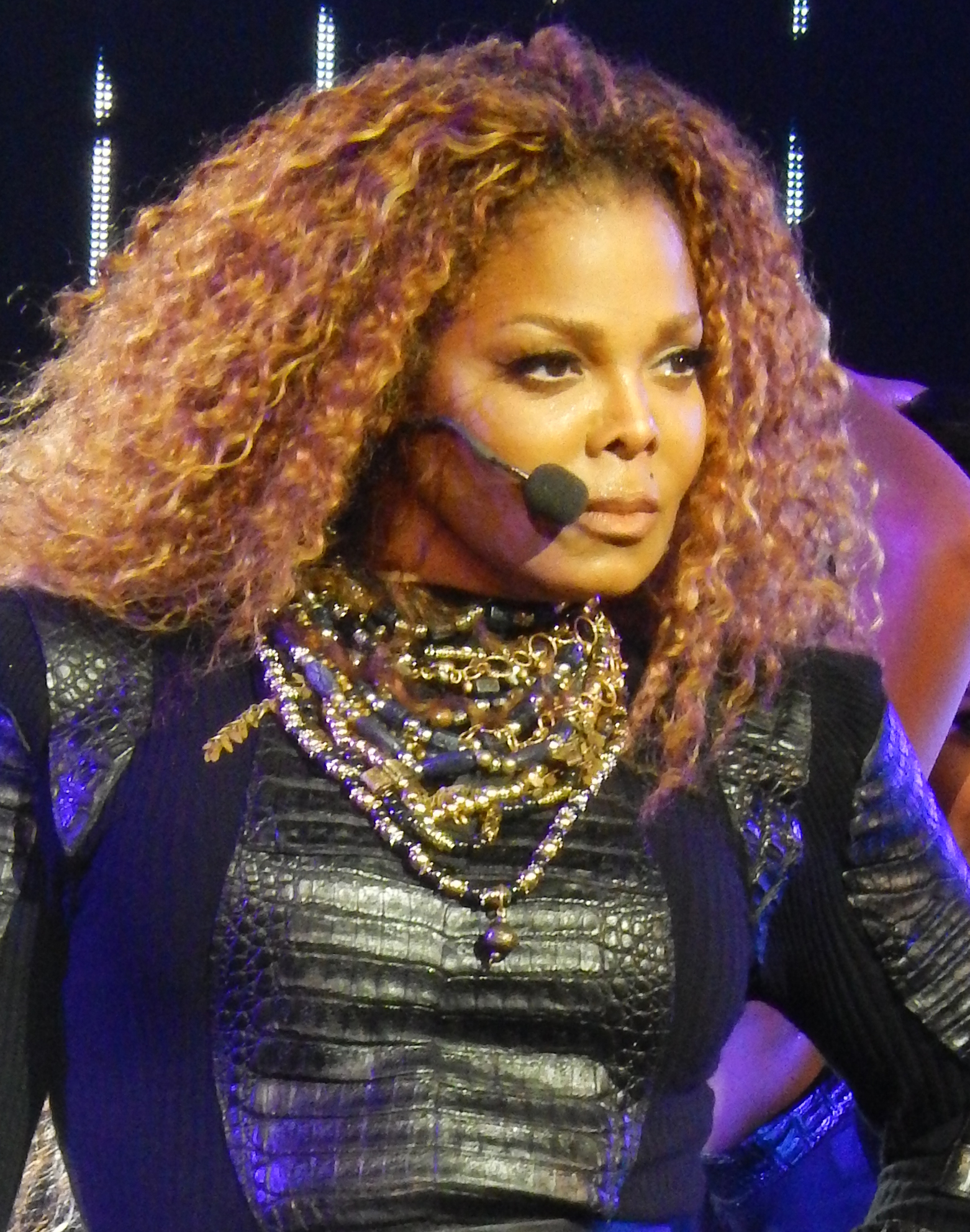
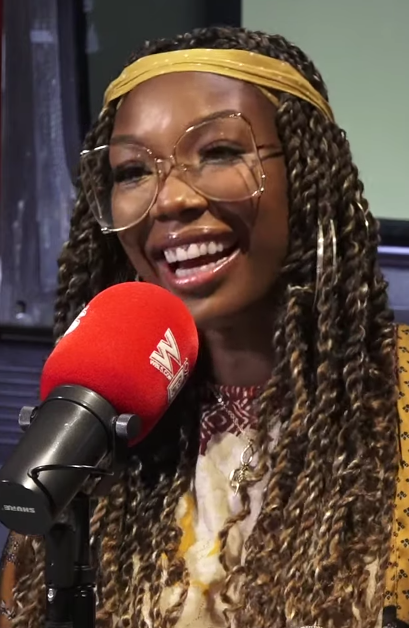
Janet Jackson (left), whose song "Empty" inspired elements of the album, and Brandy (right), whose vocal style influenced the opening track "No Simulation".

Quantum Baby is an experimental R&B record that incorporates elements of pop and R&B. According to The Boston Globe, it is "a reflection of where Tinashe is mentally in her life", as it takes into account "feelings of freedom and confidence, but also 'dealing with the world'". Tinashe noted that Janet Jackson's song "Empty" served as an inspiration for the album. She also described the album as a continuation of BB/Ang3l, noting that it is "a lot more 808-heavy", "a little bit darker", and features "more hip-hop elements". Although the album was released near the end of summer, critics noted that it carries the "Nasty" mindset well into the fall.

"Nasty"
A 17-second sample of "Nasty". Tinashe repeats "match my freak" from the song, reflecting on the idea of aligning love languages and being intentional in a relationship.

Quantum Baby opens with Brandy-inspired ballad, "No Simulation", an atmospheric opening track that features Tinashe harmonizing over moody, contemplative instrumentation. "Getting No Sleep" is an electronic pop, bass-driven, and R&B track which evokes Tinashe's signature style as a follow-up to "Nasty". According to Billboard writer Stephen Daw, the track has "cool" synth chords and "skittering" beats. While "Thirsty" is a woozy, sultry, and trap-tuned soul track. According to NME's Kyann-Sian Williams, "Red Flags" maintains a "hypnotic vibe", as it addresses intimate disappointments like "No Broke Boys". "Cross That Line" is a dance song which invigorates Jersey club bassline, as Tinashe divides genres by blending pop enunciations with R&B-driven beats. "When I Get You Alone" is draped in a lusty, late-night haze that unfolds more gradually. "No Broke Boys" features a more energetic and outspoken tone. The final track of the album, "Nasty", serves as the instructive piece of the puzzle, functioning similarly to how "Needs" operated on BB/Ang3l. Chris Kelly of Washington Post said the song's beat, bass, melody, message, and attitude synchronize "like clockwork".

=== Lyrics ===
Even with this project, there's a lot of songs that feel kind of strong, and they feel in your face, and they feel confident. But then there's also, on the flip side, those songs that feel so vulnerable, and having that juxtaposition between those two things that make me human. I think that's just a really interesting place to focus on.

— Tinashe in Apple Music interview discussing Quantum Baby's themes

On "Getting No Sleep", Nosaj Thing's introspective downtempo production gives the song a "melancholic bounce", while Tinashe delivers her lines in "flirty sing-talk", including "Head to toe in Versace, yeah / Take you back to the lobby, yeah". The opener "No Simulation" focuses on her search for truth "over a funky, distorted bassline", where she asks, "What's next?" and "Lessons I've learned", and responds, "Just to go deeper", a sentiment echoed in her line "These days I wanna feel it, no simulation / It's gotta be true". Although the lyric may suggest she is "looking for real love", Pitchfork notes that Tinashe is "a comedic and peculiar storyteller", implying that when she pledges "to go deeper", the phrase may carry more "explicit directions". "When I Get You Alone" features her "frosted vocals" gliding over "muted, thunderous drums" as she expresses a desire for intimate time with a lover: "Let me be your baby... I'ma lay you down, take it nice and slow". In the song's second part, after the relationship ends, she acknowledges lingering desire, singing, "Just can'f go from friends to enemies... You know we gon' f**k eventually... How the hell you gon' let me go?" On "No Broke Boys", Tinashe delivers what Spin calls "a model of poise", opening with the line, "The ex is on the line / Just as I expected / No one ever gets over me".

== Promotion ==
=== Marketing and touring ===
Tinashe performing at Ace of Spades during her North American leg of the Match My Freak Tour

On April 8, 2024, Tinashe announced Quantum Baby via her social media, describing it as BB/Ang3l's part two. To celebrate the upcoming release of Quantum Baby, Tinashe hosted an exclusive listening party at Levi's House in Los Angeles, where attendees previewed the album. On June 28, hours after the release of "Getting No Sleep", Tinashe announced that the album would be released on August 16. The album's tracklist was revealed on August 1.

On August 6, Tinashe announced the Match My Freak: World Tour, in support of the album. The tour began its North American leg in Anaheim, California on October 14 and concluded in Sacramento, California on November 25. Tinashe announced UK and European tour on October 24. Raveena performed as an opening act.

=== Singles and music videos ===
"Nasty" serves as Quantum Baby's lead single, released on April 12, 2024. The release date coincided with her performance at the 2024 Coachella Music Festival. In late April, a Twitter user posted a video with the song behind a video of a man and woman dancing together. The video, whose background music was replaced to "Nasty", went viral across social medias, to which Tinashe herself recreated the video, and it caused the song to gain traction. On May 22, the song reached over 600k streams and entered the US Billboard Hot 100 at number 90 on June 15, becoming Tinashe's first entry on the Hot 100 since her 2016 collaboration with Britney Spears on "Slumber Party". It eventually peaked at number 61 on the Hot 100 and also peaked at number 15 on the US Hot R&B/Hip-Hop Songs. Tinashe performed the song on Jimmy Kimmel Live!, after the release of Match My Freak EP. "Getting No Sleep" was released on June 28, 2024, as the second single from the album. Co-written with Billy Lemos and Nosaj Thing, the music video was released on same day.

"No Broke Boys" was released as the third single on August 29 with a lyric video, alongside the album. Its music video was released on October 18. Although the original song did not chart on the Hot 100, it entered the US Hot R&B Songs chart, debuting and peaking at number 25 as well as peaking at number 13 on the US Rhythmic Airplay chart. The former became her twelfth entry on the chart. In New Zealand, the song debuted and peaked at number 25 on the New Zealand Heatseekers chart. American DJ Disco Lines remixed the song and it was released on June 6, 2025. The remix went viral and finally peaked at number 36 on the Hot 100 and number 1 on the US Hot Dance/Electronic Songs chart, as well as number 2 on UK Singles Chart and number 1 on UK Dance Chart.

On December 11, Tinashe released a music video for "Cross That Line", directed by Jonah Haber. The music video continues the story from her "No Broke Boys" video and touches on themes of perception and surveillance.

== Critical reception ==
Professional ratings
Aggregate scores
Source	Rating
AnyDecentMusic?	6.9/10
Metacritic	77/100
Review scores
Source	Rating
AllMusic	4/5 stars
The Line of Best Fit	7/10
NME	3/5 stars
The Observer	3/5 stars
Pitchfork	7.9/10
Resident Advisor	80%
Rolling Stone	3.5/5 stars
Slant Magazine	3.5/5 stars
Spin	A−
Variety	75%

Quantum Baby was received positively by critics. At Metacritic, which assigns a weighted mean rating out of 100 to reviews from mainstream critics, the album received an average score of 77, based on twelve reviews.

Some reviewers evaluated the album through the lens of its conceptual framework and its place within Tinashe's planned trilogy. Writing for Slant Magazine, Nick Seip noted that the project, paired with the concise BB/Ang3l (2023), "starts to feel more substantial". Julissa James of the Los Angeles Times similarly praised the album as a confident continuation of the trilogy, observing that it presents Tinashe as an artist who thrives in ambiguity and leans into the complexities of her own desires and needs. At The Line of Best Fit, Sam Franzini wrote that while the record is "not, technically, Tinashe at her best" and feels more like a capstone than a full era, it nonetheless reinforces her consistency as "an athlete, sex icon, visionary, and artist rolled into one". Franzini also pointed to the contrast between BB/Ang3l's experimental tendencies and Quantum Baby's alignment with the rest of her discography, suggesting that the interplay between these modes shapes its overall character.

Other critics highlighted the album's stylistic fusion, vocal performance, and production choices. For AllMusic, Andy Kellman described Quantum Baby as "another highly concentrated shot of material", noting that the album shows Tinashe moving with ease—sometimes blurring the line—between "sensual slow jams and pop-flavored dance tracks". Kitty Empire of The Observer called it an eight-track set that is "simultaneously playful, featherlight and nagging", shaped by '90s influences and modern trap elements. Tarisai Ngangura of Pitchfork deemed it a "lean and muscular eight-song accompaniment" to BB/Ang3l, praising the Brandy-inspired opener "No Simulation" and its layered vocal arrangement. In Rolling Stone, Rob Sheffield noted that the album builds on "Nasty" with "moody electric-blue pop and sultry alternative R&B", adding that its 22-minute runtime "doesn't overstay its welcome". Alfred Soto of Spin described the project as eight "crisply sung and programmed lessons in pre- and post-coital self-presentation", brief but fully inhabited.

Some reviewers focused on the album's sense of duality and the balance of its contrasting sonic identities. Kyann-Sian Williams of NME argued that while the record confirms the playfulness introduced by "Nasty", its blend of cheeky moments and ethereal, brooding textures "doesn't weld these two sides of Tinashe successfully", instead serving as an enjoyable step toward a future "sweet spot".

=== Year-end lists ===
Quantum Baby appeared on several year-end lists. People ranked the album at number seven on its Top 10 Albums of 2024. The Forty-Five placed it at number 38 on its Best Albums of 2024 list, while Paper ranked it second on its Best Albums of 2024. It was also included on year-end lists by Okayplayer and Vulture. KTLA featured the album at number ten on its 10 Best Albums of 2024, Hypebae ranked it fourth on its Best Albums of 2024, and Rated R&B placed it nineteenth on its 25 Best R&B Albums of 2024.

The album's lead single, "Nasty", also received year-end recognition. Time ranked the song second on its 10 Best Songs of 2024, and The Hollywood Reporter placed it third on its 10 Best Songs of 2024. Vibe featured "Nasty" at number five on its 25 Best R&B Songs of 2024, while Rolling Stone ranked it seventh on its 100 Best Songs of 2024. The track also appeared on year-end lists by Billboard (14), Pitchfork (33), and NME (22).

Quantum Baby on year-end lists
Publication	Accolade	Rank	Ref.
People	Top 10 Albums of 2024	7	
The Forty-Five	The Best Albums of 2024	38	
Okayplayer	The 50 Best Albums of 2024	—N/a	
Paper	The Best Albums of 2024	2	
Vulture	The Best Albums of 2024	—N/a	
KTLA	The 10 Best Albums of 2024	10	
Hypebae	The Best Albums of 2024	4	
Rated R&B	The 25 Best R&B Albums of 2024	19	

== Track listing ==
Quantum Baby track listing
No.	Title	Writer(s)	Producer(s)	Length
1.	"No Simulation"	Tinashe Kachingwe; Jason W. Chung; Darhyl Camper Jr.	Nosaj Thing; Ricky Reed^{[a]}	1:48
2.	"Getting No Sleep"	Kachingwe; Chung; Billy Lemos	Nosaj Thing; Lemos; Reed^{[a]}	3:12
3.	"Thirsty"	Kachingwe; Troy Artopoeus	sdtroy	3:40
4.	"Red Flags"	Kachingwe; Eric Bellinger; John Alexis Mendoza; Richard Zastenker	John Alexis; LIOHN	2:09
5.	"Cross That Line"	Kachingwe; Charlotte "Charli" Spence; Juan Guerrieri Mari; Toian Keisha Gichie	Z3N	2:48
6.	"When I Get You Alone"	Kachingwe; Spence; Jordan Odegard; Gichie; Artopoeus	Odegard; sdtroy	3:20
7.	"No Broke Boys"	Kachingwe; Eric Frederic; Michael Neil	Phoelix; Reed; Zack Sekoff	2:12
8.	"Nasty"	Kachingwe; Frederic; Sekoff	Reed; Sekoff	2:56
Total length:				22:05

Notes

- ^{^[a]} signifies an additional producer.

== Personnel ==
- Tinashe – vocals
- Alicia Abboud – vocals (track 7)
- Nakisa Kachingwe – vocals (track 7)
- Phoelix – keyboards (track 7)
- Ricky Reed – programming, vocal production (tracks 7, 8)
- Zack Sekoff – programming (tracks 7, 8)
- Ike Schultz – mixing, engineering (all tracks); vocal production (tracks 1–7)
- Ethan Shumaker – engineering (tracks 7, 8)
- Shane Moloney – engineering assistance (track 7)
- Chris Gehringer – mastering

== Charts ==
Chart performance
Chart (2024)	Peak position
UK Album Downloads (Official Charts)	92
US Billboard 200	199
US Top R&B Albums (Billboard)	23

== Certifications ==
Region	Certification	Certified units/sales
New Zealand (RMNZ)	Gold	7,500^{‡}
^{‡} Sales+streaming figures based on certification alone.

== Release history ==
Release history
Region	Date	Format	Label	Ref.
Various	August 16, 2024	CD; digital download; LP; streaming	Tinashe Music; Nice Life	
