= Nasty (Tinashe song) =

Single by Tinashe

from the album Quantum Baby
- Released: April 12, 2024
- Recorded: November 2023
- Studio: Elysian Park (Los Angeles); Tinashe Music (Los Angeles)
- Genre: R&B; pop; trap
- Length: 2:56
- Label: Tinashe Music; Nice Life
- Songwriters: Tinashe Kachingwe; Eric Burton Frederic
- Producers: Ricky Reed; Zack Sekoff

Tinashe singles chronology
"Needs" (2023)	"Nasty" (2024)	"Getting No Sleep" (2024)

Match My Freak EP cover

Music video
- "Nasty" on YouTube

"Nasty" is a song by the American singer and songwriter Tinashe from her seventh studio album, Quantum Baby (2024). It was released by Ricky Reed's Nice Life Recording Company on April 12, 2024, as the album's lead single. A sexual R&B song written by Tinashe, Reed, and produced by Zack Sekoff and Reed, it has a sparse beat and various innuendos. Tinashe rap-sings in a deadpan tone about looking for a lover who has an equivalent sex drive to hers. Its release coincided with her performance at the 2024 Coachella Valley Music & Arts Festival and with the release of its music video.

Critics enjoyed "Nasty" for its hooks and its catchiness, with many identifying it as the best song from Quantum Baby and as one of the best songs of 2024. A video of TikTok user Nate Di Winer dancing with the song edited over it became a meme on Twitter in April 2024, causing a surge in streams for it. Other memes involving the song, particularly those surrounding its line, "Is somebody gonna match my freak?", also propelled the track's popularity. "Nasty" peaked at number 61 on the Billboard Hot 100 in June 2024, making it Tinashe's first entry on the chart as a lead artist since 2014 and her first-ever solo entry, and at number 66 on the UK Singles Chart. She also performed the song throughout the run of her Match My Freak: World Tour.

== Background and release ==
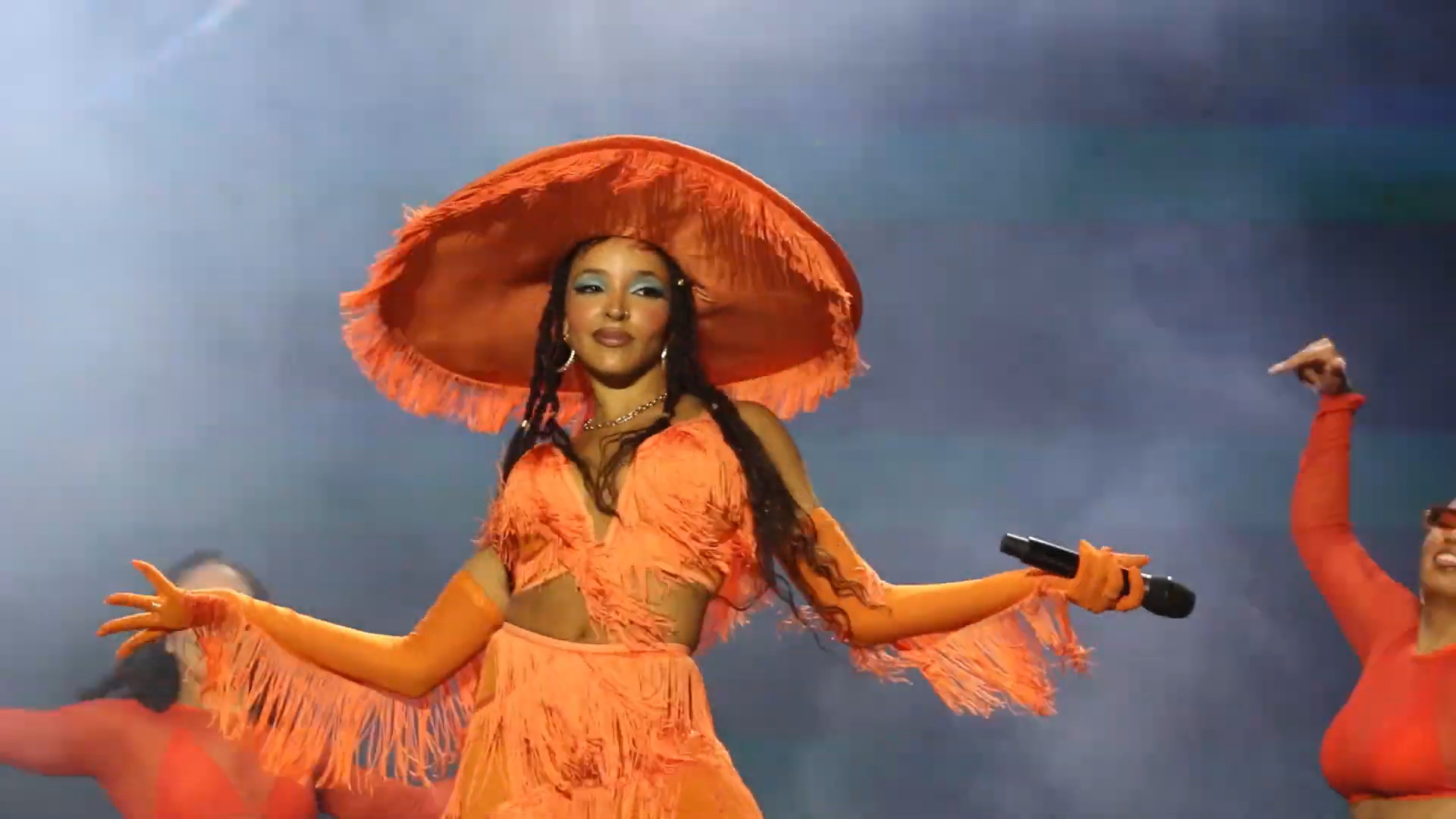
Tinashe performing in 2023

Before releasing "Nasty", Tinashe released three studio albums through RCA Records before going independent in 2019, citing creative differences. She self-released her next two albums and released her sixth studio album through the producer Ricky Reed's Nice Life Recording Company, a sublabel of Atlantic Records. In April 2024, she signed a worldwide publishing deal with Position Music, obtaining the publishing rights to her future releases from that point forward and her to previous album BB/Ang3l. Tinashe teased "Nasty" in an Instagram Live video on Valentine's Day in 2024 and teased her forthcoming seventh studio album, Quantum Baby—the second in a trilogy of albums following BB/Ang3l—with a trailer shared on her various social media platforms on April 8. "Nasty", the lead single from Quantum Baby, and its music video were both released on April 12, 2024, through Nice Life. Quantum Baby was released on August 16, 2024, with "Nasty" as its closing track.

On June 18, 2024, Tinashe released the Match My Freak extended play (EP), comprising the single version of "Nasty" and five remixes, including a Jersey club remix by Uniiqu3 (the "Match My Speed" remix), a club-inspired remix by Wuki (the "Match My Peak" remix), a "hyperactive, chopped-up" rave remix by Jane Remover (the "Match My Tweak" remix), a chopped and screwed remix by OG Ron C and DJ Candlestick (the "Match My Sleek" remix), and a remix by DJ Tunez. Later that month, she released a capsule collection of "Nasty"-themed merchandise, including condoms, temporary tattoos, boxers, hockey jerseys, socks, towels, pendants, tank tops, t-shirts, and hoodies. Her record label, Tinashe Music Inc, applied to trademark the song's lyrical phrase "match my freak" in June 2024. On July 19, 2024, she released two new remixes of "Nasty", each separately featuring Chlöe and Tyga.

== Writing and composition ==
"Nasty"
A sample of the chorus and post-chorus of "Nasty", in which Tinashe sings the refrain, "I've been a nasty girl, nasty" and asks, "Is somebody gonna match my freak?" over a minimal beat.

"Nasty" was written by Tinashe with Reed, who produced the song with Zack Sekoff, over the course of two writing sessions. The song's title was taken from a necklace bearing the word "nasty" Tinashe made around Christmas of 2023. It was based on "Nasty Nashe", a "confident and braggadocious" alter ego she created for herself inspired by the 1986 Janet Jackson song "Nasty". She came up with the phrase "match my freak" while driving and decided to incorporate it into the song. During Tinashe and Reed's initial writing session for the song, they focused on creating a hook with two distinct sections: one which would be, according to Tinashe, "soaring" and "very melodic", and the other which would be "super talky and chanty".

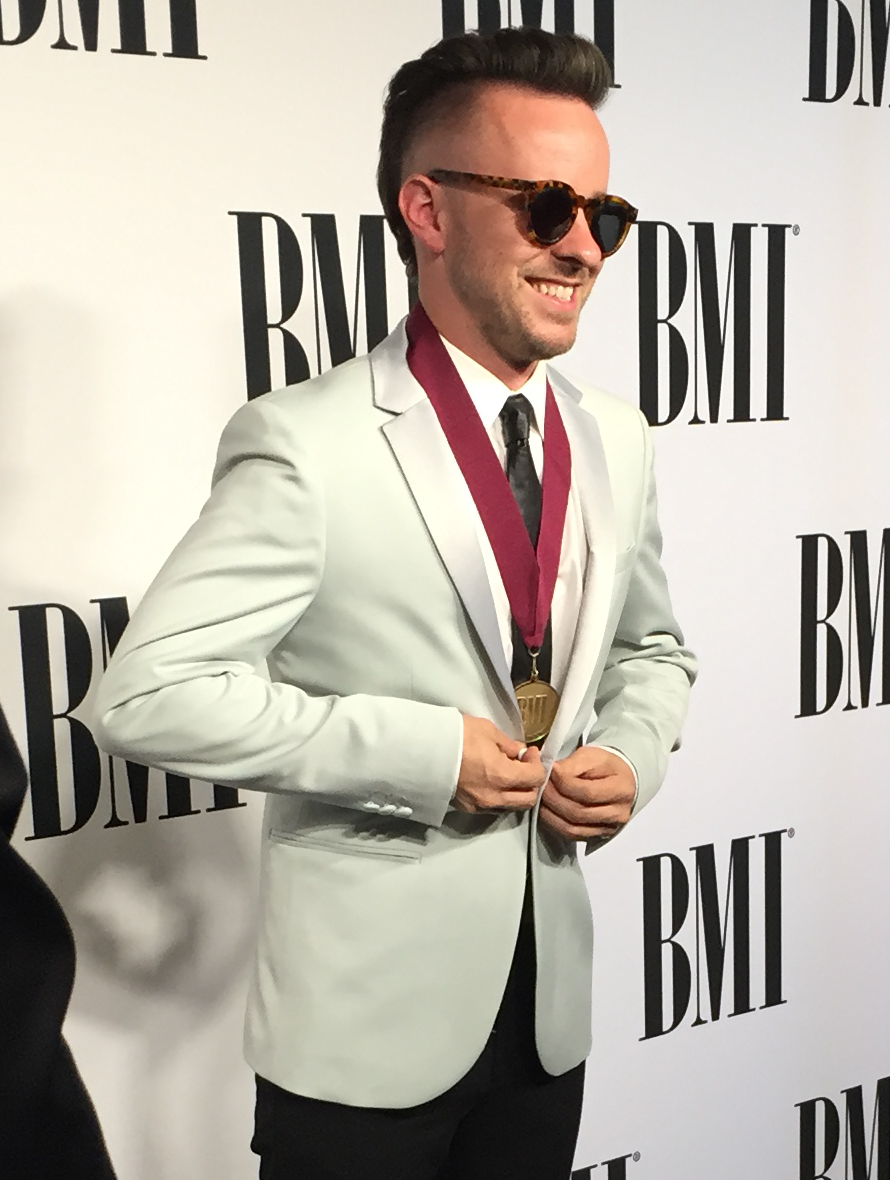
Ricky Reed (pictured) co-produced and co-wrote "Nasty".

"Nasty" is an understated R&B, trap, and rhythmic pop song. Its beat is made up of 808s, a kick drum, a synth bass, and looping chords. It is written in the key of D major at 120 beats per minute. Tinashe "rap-sings" on it in a deadpan tone about searching for someone to match her sexual energy, which she alternately calls her "freak" and her "nasty". She repeatedly asks, "Is somebody gonna match my freak?" while also using several double entendres and innuendos. The song has "robotic" hooks and, in its second verse, she details a sexually charged date night, singing "Shotgun, my thighs on his seat/I ain't got nothing underneath/Looks like you're 'bout to spend the night/Looks like I'm 'bout to change your life".

Variety's Steven J. Horowitz called the song's instrumental "sparse" and "hollow", while Chris Kelly of the Washington Post wrote that it was made up of "a barely-there beat and dial tone melody". For Time, Stephen Kearse called the song's beat "breezy" and "minimal". Its beat was described by Alex Gonzalez of Uproxx as "punchy" and "futuristic". Tinashe described "Nasty" as "fun, sexy, empowered and cute" and as a celebration of "be[ing] hot and hav[ing] fun" in the summer. Stereogum's Tom Breihan jokingly likened the song to a "horny-robot mating call", while Sam Franzini of The Line of Best Fit described it as "flirtatious" and "silly while also being confident in its claims".

== Virality ==
"Nasty" first became popular online due to the virality of a video from February 2024 by the British TikTok user Nate Di Winer, also known as Nates.Vibe. Wearing glasses, he wines, gyrates his hips, bites his finger, and sticks his tongue out to the soca song "Bind" by Hey Choppi alongside his dance partner. Critics described him as looking nerdy. It was reposted on Twitter by user @grruessome with "Nasty" playing over it in April 2024, causing it to quickly become an Internet meme, including on TikTok, and gain over 10 million views on Twitter by May 2024. Tinashe also posted several videos of herself recreating the dance over the original video, while other artists, including Omar Apollo, Zooey Deschanel, Christina Aguilera, and Kehlani, also recreated the dance on TikTok. Nate Di Winer and his instructor recreated the dance in a video for Marc Jacobs's TikTok account in May 2024. The video's popularity online led to a 48 percent increase in streams for the song in early May. In August 2024, TikTok ranked "Nasty" as the platform's top song of the summer in the United Kingdom and at number two on its international list. By November 2024, the song had been used in more than 5.6 million videos on TikTok.

"Nasty" found further viral success due to a tweet asking, "Who are 2 people that actually did match each others freak?" by user @hugetulip, which was retweeted over 31 thousand times by the end of May 2024; its use in video edits of the 2024 film Challengers; and a mashup of it with the Beach House song "Space Song" (2015) on TikTok, which users used to describe their ideal relationship as "match[ing] their freak". Horowitz deemed "Nasty" a "cultural event" that had been "memeified across social media" by May 2024, while Tinashe stated that RCA Records was likely "gagging" at its success without them. Josiah Gogarty of British GQ pointed to the song's relative lack of commercial success compared to its TikTok success as evidence that the platform "isn't quite the hit factory it once was" and as "a reminder there is no smooth pipeline from viral to commercial success", while Mark Savage of BBC News similarly described its chart positions as "a sign that TikTok's stranglehold on the music industry may be waning".

== Commercial performance ==
On the chart dated June 15, 2024, "Nasty" debuted at number 90 on the Billboard Hot 100, becoming Tinashe's overall fifth entry on the chart. It became her second entry on the chart as a lead artist after "2 On" in 2014 and her first solo song on the chart. It rose to number 69 on the chart the following week, prompting Tinashe to tweet that "Billboard matched [her] freak". It later peaked at number 61. The song also peaked at number 15 on the US Hot R&B/Hip-Hop Songs on the chart dated August 3, 2024. It was certified gold by the Recording Industry Association of America (RIAA) in November 2024, giving her her second RIAA certification as a lead artist and her fourth overall. The song also peaked at number 66 on the UK Singles Chart.

== Critical reception ==
For Vulture, Jennifer Zhan wrote that "Nasty" was "a perfect example of what Tinashe does best: making sexy dance tracks with near-hypnotic hooks". Breihan called it "very horny" and "very good". Kitty Empire of The Observer, in a review of Quantum Baby, called "Nasty" the "standout" of the album; Rolling Stone's Rob Sheffield named it the album's highlight and the third best song of 2024, describing it as "the year's most reliable 'today sucked until I put this song on' song" and "one of the most indelible hits of summer 2024" that "got everyone walking around for months with the hook 'I've been a nasty girl' stuck in our heads". Horowitz also called it "one of the most unshakeable anthems on this side of the year" and Nick Seip, for Slant, identified "Nasty" as an outlier on Quantum Baby for its "catchy hooks" and "endlessly meme-able lyrics". For Complex, Jaelani Turner-Williams wrote that the song and its "atmospheric production", "throbbing bass", and "teasing" hook were proof "that very few pop stars are on [Tinashe's] level".

Writing for Pitchfork, Rob Arcand wrote that the song "makes desperation sound completely divine" and "recogniz[es] that the most honest erotic expressions are born from a more general desire to be cared for". Tarisai Ngangura, also of Pitchfork, praised "Nasty" as "the platonically great Tinashe song: easy and exquisite, an evolution without a departure". Kelly also dubbed it "the platonic ideal of a Tinashe song" that "feels much bigger than its Billboard chart position" on which "beat, bass, melody, message and attitude sync like clockwork". Gogarty praised "Nasty" as "great" due to the "jarring, juddering transition" from the "fairly straightforward R&B production" of its verses to its "weird" chorus. Kyann-Sian Williams of NME wrote that "Nasty" had "multiple sinfully addictive lines, like 'Is somebody gonna match my freak?'" and an "addictive spark" that other songs on Quantum Baby lacked. Andrew Jankowski called it "easily one of [Tinashe's] least creatively daring songs" for Willamette Week.

Time listed "Nasty" as the second-best song of 2024; Entertainment Weekly, Slant, Los Angeles Times, Crack, Complex, Billboard, Pitchfork, NPR, and Uproxx also included the song on their lists of the best songs of the year. Vibe and Pitchfork both ranked "Nasty" as a contender for "song of the summer" in 2024. Brenton Blanchet of People considered the song not being nominated at the 67th Annual Grammy Awards to be a snub. In September 2024, Pitchfork included "Nasty" on their list of "The 100 Best Songs of the 2020s So Far", ranking it at number 98.

Nasty on year-end lists
Publication	Accolade	Rank	Ref.
Time Magazine	The 10 Best Songs of 2024	2	
The Hollywood Reporter	The 10 Best Songs of 2024	3	
Vibe Magazine	The 25 Best R&B Songs of 2024	5	
Dazed	The 20 Best Tracks of 2024	6	
Rolling Stone	The 100 Best Songs of 2024	7	
Entertainment Weekly	The 10 Best Songs of 2024	7	
Stereogum	The 50 Best Songs of 2024	10	
The New York Times	Best Songs of 2024	10	
Crack Magazine	The Top 25 Tracks of 2024	12	
Los Angeles Times	The 30 best songs of 2024	13	
Complex	The 50 Best Songs of 2024	13	
Billboard	The 100 Best Songs of 2024	14	
Resident Advisor	The Best Tracks of 2024	14	
The Fader	The 50 Best Songs of 2024	16	
NME	The 50 Best Songs of 2024	22	
Pitchfork	The 100 Best Songs of 2024	33	
Clash	Songs Of The Year 2024	38	
Paste Magazine	The 100 Best Songs of 2024	72	

== Accolades ==
Awards and nominations for "Nasty"
Award	Year	Category	Result	Ref.
MTV Video Music Awards	2024	Best Trending Video	Nominated	
Juno Awards	2025	Video of the Year	Nominated	
Queerty Awards	2025	Anthem	Nominated	

== Music video ==
In the music video for "Nasty", Tinashe shoots at an army of drones following her.

The accompanying music video for "Nasty" was released the same day as the single on April 12, 2024. It was directed by Jonah Haber and choreographed by Jojo Gomez. In it, Tinashe dances in a desert near a car while being chased down by robots with surveillance cameras attached. At the end, she fires at them with a gun and escapes.

Tinashe stated that the video was partially inspired by the Quentin Tarantino film Death Proof (2007) and described its concept as "living in 2024 and constantly being perceived". Following its release, Ivan Guzman of Paper described the video as "a study in sexy surveillance, shot in the desert and intentionally timed around the recent eclipse". Taylor Henderson of BET wrote that the video was "Mad Max-inspired", while Gonzalez praised the video's choreography as "next-level". Lester Fabian Braithwaite of Entertainment Weekly compared the video to those for Janet Jackson's 1994 song "You Want This" and Mya's 2000 song "Case of the Ex". It was nominated for the fan-voted award for Best Trending Video at the 2024 MTV Video Music Awards (VMAs), which was her first nomination for a VMA.

== Live performances and other appearances ==
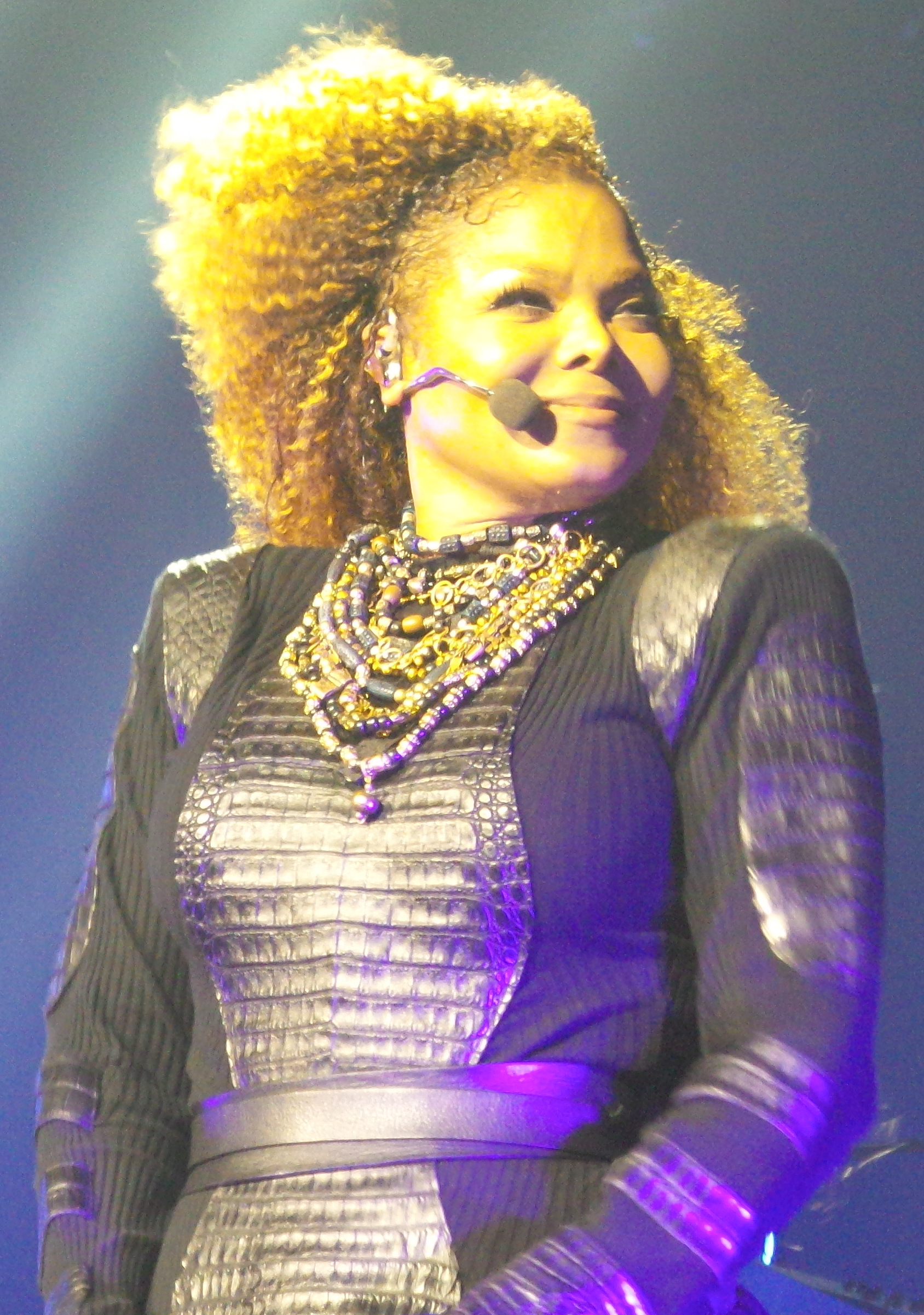
Janet Jackson (pictured) performed a mashup of "Nasty" with her 1986 song "Nasty" on her Janet Jackson: Together Again tour in 2024.

Tinashe performed "Nasty" live for the first time during her debut performance at the Coachella Valley Music and Arts Festival at the Mojave stage in April 2024. She then performed the song on Jimmy Kimmel Live! in June of that year. She included it as the closing number of her Match My Freak: World Tour, which is named after the song. The tour ran from late 2024 to early 2025. She also performed the song on the final stop of the UO Live Concert Series at University of Arizona in September 2024 and during the 2025 Dick Clark's New Year's Rockin' Eve special.

Janet Jackson performed a mashup of "Nasty" with her own 1986 song of the same name while performing at the Utah First Credit Union Amphitheatre in Utah on her Together Again tour in June 2024. Also that month, Beyoncé used the song on her Instagram Stories while promoting her hair care brand, Cécred. Azealia Banks also uploaded an unofficial remix of "Nasty" to her Instagram account that year.

== Track listing ==
Digital download and 7-inch single
No.	Title	Length
1.	"Nasty"	2:56

Digital download
No.	Title	Length
1.	"Nasty Girl Remix" (featuring Chlöe)	2:36

Digital download
No.	Title	Length
1.	"Nasty XXX Remix" (featuring Tyga)	2:36

Match My Freak EP
No.	Title	Remixer(s)	Length
1.	"Nasty"		2:56
2.	"Nasty Girl Remix" (featuring Chlöe)		2:36
3.	"Nasty XXX Remix" (featuring Tyga)		2:36
4.	"Nasty" (Match My Chic Remix)	Kaytranada	3:02
5.	"Nasty" (Match My Heat Remix)	DJ Tunez	4:43
6.	"Nasty" (Match My Peak Remix)	Wuki	2:39
7.	"Nasty" (Match My Speed Remix)	Uniiqu3	2:06
8.	"Nasty" (Match My Tweak)	Jane Remover	3:51
9.	"Nasty" (Match My Sleek Remix (ChopNotSlop))	OG Ron C; DJ Candlestick	3:59
Total length:			28:31

Notes

- Match My Freak EP was released on June 18, 2024, and it featured only the lattermost five remixes.
- "Match My Chic Remix" was added to the tracklist on July 5, 2024.
- "Nasty Girl Remix" and "Nasty XXX Remix" were added to the tracklist on July 19, 2024.

== Credits and personnel ==
Credits were derived from Apple Music and Tidal.

Recording locations

- Elysian Park; Los Angeles, California
- Tinashe Music; Los Angeles

Musicians and technical

- Tinashe – vocals, songwriting
- Ricky Reed – production, songwriting, programming
- Zack Sekoff – production, programming
- Ike Schultz – mixing
- Ethan Shumaker – engineering
- Chris Gehringer – mastering

== Charts ==
=== Weekly charts ===
Weekly chart performance
Chart (2024)	Peak position
Australia (ARIA)	83
Canada Hot 100 (Billboard)	61
Global 200 (Billboard)	84
Honduras Anglo Airplay (Monitor Latino)	6
Ireland (IRMA)	75
New Zealand Hot Singles (RMNZ)	10
Philippines (Philippines Hot 100)	24
UK Singles (Official Charts)	66
UK Hip Hop/R&B (Official Charts)	25
UK Independent (Official Charts)	14
US Billboard Hot 100	61
US Hot R&B/Hip-Hop Songs (Billboard)	15
US Pop Airplay (Billboard)	25
US Rhythmic Airplay (Billboard)	2

=== Year-end charts ===
2024 year-end chart performance
Chart (2024)	Position
US Hot R&B/Hip-Hop Songs (Billboard)	49
US Rhythmic (Billboard)	16

== Certifications ==
Region	Certification	Certified units/sales
New Zealand (RMNZ)	Gold	15,000^{‡}
United States (RIAA)	Platinum	1,000,000^{‡}
^{‡} Sales+streaming figures based on certification alone.

== Release history ==
Release dates and formats
Region	Date	Format(s)	Version	Label	Ref.
Various	April 12, 2024	Digital download; streaming	Original	Tinashe Music Inc; Nice Life	
United States	May 28, 2024	Rhythmic contemporary radio	Original	Tinashe Music Inc; Nice Life	
Various	June 18, 2024	Digital download; streaming	Match My Freak EP	Tinashe Music Inc; Nice Life	
Various	July 5, 2024	Digital download; streaming	Match My Chic remix	Tinashe Music Inc; Nice Life	
Various	July 19, 2024	Digital download; streaming	Nasty Girl remix; Nasty XXX remix	Tinashe Music Inc; Nice Life	
United States	November 11, 2024	Urban Outfitters cobalt blue vinyl	Original	Tinashe Music Inc; Nice Life	
