= No Broke Boys =

2024 single by Tinashe

Single by Tinashe

from the album Quantum Baby
- Released: August 16, 2024
- Genre: R&B
- Length: 2:12
- Label: Tinashe Music; Nice Life
- Songwriters: Tinashe Kachingwe; Eric Frederic; Michael Neil
- Producers: Ricky Reed; Phoelix; Zack Sekoff

Tinashe singles chronology
"Getting No Sleep" (2024)	"No Broke Boys" (2024)	"No Broke Boys" (remix) (2025)

Music video
- "No Broke Boys" on YouTube

"No Broke Boys" is a song by American singer-songwriter Tinashe. It was released on August 16, 2024, in tandem with the music video from her seventh studio album, Quantum Baby (2024). Produced by Ricky Reed, Zack Sekoff, and Phoelix, the song is an R&B track that draws thematic comparisons to Gwen Guthrie's "Ain't Nothin' Goin' On but the Rent" and TLC's "No Scrubs", and it features a concluding chorus inspired by Janet Jackson's song "Go Deep".

"No Broke Boys" received generally positive reviews from critics, who praised its sharp call-outs and catchy hook, though some outlets noted its reliance on pop tropes. It was supported by a Bring It On–inspired music video and multiple live performances. A 2025 remix by Disco Lines later became a global hit, reaching the top ten in several countries and topping Billboard's Hot Dance/Electronic Songs chart.

== Background and composition ==
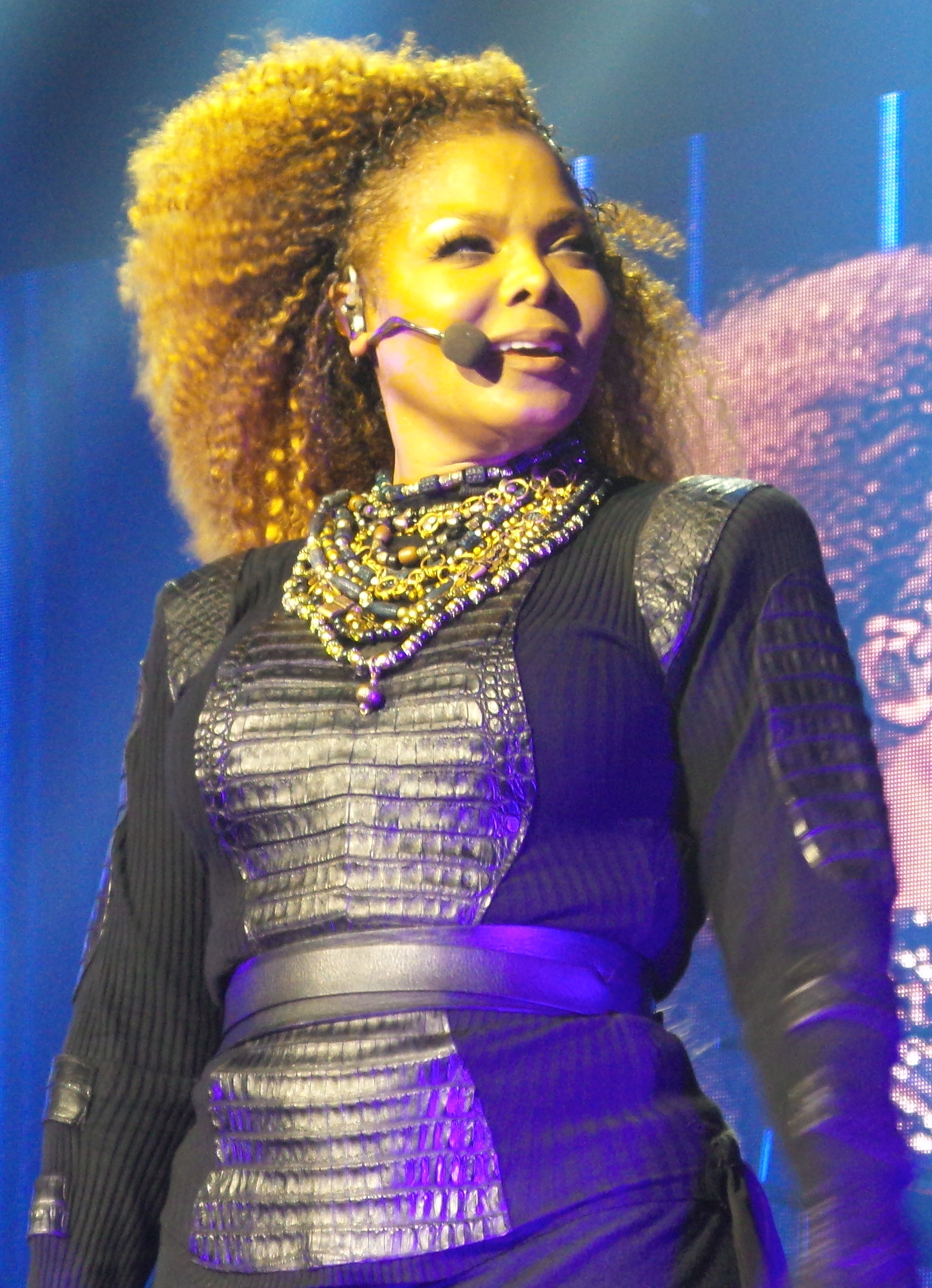
Tinashe revealed her inspiration from Janet Jackson's song "Go Deep". (pictured)

"No Broke Boys" was confirmed for release when Tinashe revealed it on the track listing of Quantum Baby, on August 1, 2024. On August 12, Tinashe went live on Instagram and revealed that the concluding chorus of the song was inspired by Janet Jackson's 1998 single "Go Deep". Produced by Ricky Reed, Zack Sekoff, and Phoelix, the song has been described as a thematic descendant of Gwen Guthrie's "Ain't Nothin' Goin' On but the Rent" and TLC's "No Scrubs". "No Broke Boys" is a "confident R&B" song that echos its aporophobiac theme. It also touches on "intimate disappointments", featuring the lines such as "The ex is on the line / Just as I expected / No one ever gets over me". According to Variety, "No Broke Boys" carries "a similar knowing smirk", being "laced with generic pop tropes".

== Critical reception ==
Upon his review of the song's parent album, Anthony Fantano of The Needle Drop claimed the song is "actually memorable", noting that it is "actually snappy while still being very smooth and low-key". Pitchfork's Tarisai Ngangura claimed the song was "not deep enough to jolt any festering memories". Nick Seip of Slant Magazine described the song as "infectious" and called it "an empowering earworm", comparing it to the 1999 TLC hit song, "No Scrubs". The Line of Best Fit's Sam Franzini also offered a positive assessment, noting that "No Broke Boys" functions as a sharp call-out to uneven relationships and describing it as "wickedly fun", with its chant-like refrains positioned as a potential "mantra du jour" for the summer.

== Music video ==
Tinashe in "No Broke Boys" music video, portraying the captain of a white-uniformed cheer squad inspired by Bring It On (2000).

Tinashe initially released a lyric video for "No Broke Boys", on August 29, 2024. On October 4, She teased the song's music video via her TikTok, with the caption saying "Are we getting a no broke boys music vid??". In Los Angeles, she previewed the video for her audience at the Greek Theatre on October 17, while on her Match My Freak: World Tour. The video, directed by Aerin Moreno and choreographed by Monica Douglas, premiered on her Vevo channel the following day. It references the 2000 film Bring It On, a cheerleader team comedy. Tinashe portrays the captain of the white-uniformed cheer team.

== Live performances ==
On October 14, 2024, Tinashe performed the song on her Match My Freak: World Tour. She later performed at the 2024 KIIS-FM Jingle Ball on December 19, in Atlanta and Miami. The song was also performed at Dick Clark's New Year's Rockin' Eve celebration.

== Credits and personnel ==
- Tinashe – lead vocals, songwriting
- Ricky Reed – production, songwriting, programming
- Phoelix – production, songwriting, keyboards
- Zack Sekoff – production, programming
- Alicia Abboud – background vocals
- Nakisa Kachingwe – background vocals
- Ike Schultz – vocal production, mixing engineering
- Ethan Shumaker – mixing engineering
- Chris Gehringer – master engineering

== Charts ==
Chart performance
Chart (2024)	Peak position
New Zealand Hot Singles (RMNZ)	25
UK Video Streaming (OCC)	12
US Hot R&B Songs (Billboard)	25
US Rhythmic Airplay (Billboard)	13

== Certifications ==
Certifications and sales
Region	Certification	Certified units/sales
New Zealand (RMNZ)	3× Platinum	90,000^{‡}
^{‡} Sales+streaming figures based on certification alone.

== Release history ==
Release history and formats
Region	Date	Format	Version	Label	Ref.
Various	August 16, 2024	Digital download; streaming	Original	Good Good; Tinashe Music; Nice Life	(Note: According to Billboard Canada and Melodic Magazine, the original version of "No Broke Boys" is considered as a single.)
Various	June 6, 2025	Digital download; streaming	Disco Lines remix	Good Good; Tinashe Music; Nice Life	
United States	August 5, 2025	Contemporary hit radio	Disco Lines remix	Good Good; Tinashe Music; Nice Life	
Italy	August 28, 2025	Radio airplay	Disco Lines remix	Warner Italy	
Various	September 26, 2025	Digital download; streaming	Avello remix	Good Good; Tinashe Music; Nice Life	
Various	October 3, 2025	Digital download; streaming	Lee Foss remix	Good Good; Tinashe Music; Nice Life	

== Disco Lines remix ==
"No Broke Boys" (remix)

Single by Disco Lines and Tinashe
- Released: June 6, 2025
- Genre: Dance
- Length: 2:44
- Label: Good Good; Tinashe Music; Nice Life
- Songwriters: Tinashe Kachingwe; Thadeus Labuszewski; Eric Frederic; Michael Neil
- Producers: Disco Lines; Ricky Reed; Phoelix; Zack Sekoff

Disco Lines singles chronology
"Swim" (2025)	"No Broke Boys" (remix) (2025)	"I Don't Trust a Soul" (2025)

Tinashe singles chronology
"No Broke Boys" (2024)	"No Broke Boys" (remix) (2025)	"Too Easy" (2026)

Audio video
- "No Broke Boys" on YouTube

In May 2025, American DJ Disco Lines previewed a snippet of his remix to the song, which immediately gained virality on TikTok. It gathered over 40 million views on the platform before its official release. The remix was officially released on June 6, 2025, via Disco Lines' independent label, Good Good Records and Nice Life Recording Company.

=== Composition ===
"No Broke Boys" (remix)
An audio sample of "No Broke Boys" (remix). The remix transforms the original song into a high-energy, EDM-leaning dance track.

According to Melodic Magazine writer Vivian Richey, the Disco Lines remix of "No Broke Boys" reworks the original R&B track into a "high-energy dance record". As noted by Aaron Williams of Uproxx, the remix presents a "propulsive, EDM-tinged" sound and centers on the pursuit of a desirable partner, "preferably one with full pockets". Billboard writer Katie Bain described the track as the dance world's "unofficial song of the summer", noting that it originated as an edit premiered during Disco Lines' EDC Las Vegas set before receiving an official release featuring "fresh vocals" that merged Tinashe's 2024 original with his "bouncy" production.

=== Commercial performance ===
The remix has been a global success and has entered various charts worldwide. The song has reached the top ten in Ireland, the United Kingdom, Australia, Austria, Latvia, Luxembourg, Switzerland, New Zealand, Germany, Lithuania, and Canada, and the top twenty in Sweden, Netherlands, and the Billboard Global 200, while also reaching number 36 on Billboard Hot 100. It has become Disco Lines' first and Tinashe's second top 40 and sixth entry on Hot 100, as well as Disco Lines' first and Tinashe's second top ten on the UK Singles chart.

For the chart week of July 18–24, the remix rose to number one on Billboard's Hot Dance/Electronic Songs chart, becoming the first new leader on the ranking since August 2024. It marks both Disco Lines and Tinashe's first career number ones on the chart.

=== Accolades ===
Awards and nominations for "No Broke Boys (remix)"
Award	Year	Category	Result	Ref.
American Music Awards	2026	Social Song of the Year	Nominated	
BRIT Awards	2026	International Song of the Year	Nominated	
Electronic Dance Music Awards	2026	Dance Radio Song of the Year	Won	
Electronic Dance Music Awards	2026	Remix of the Year	Won	
iHeartRadio Music Awards	2026	Dance Song of the Year	Won	
Queerty Awards	2026	Anthem	Nominated	

=== Personnel ===
- Tinashe – lead vocals, songwriting
- Disco Lines – production, songwriting
- Ricky Reed – production, songwriting
- Phoelix – production, songwriting
- Zack Sekoff – production
- Alicia Abboud – background vocals
- Nakisa Kachingwe – background vocals
- Ike Schultz – vocal production, mixing engineering
- Ethan Shumaker – mixing engineering
- Chris Gehringer – mastering engineering
- Shane Maloney – assistant engineering

=== Charts ===
==== Weekly charts ====
Weekly chart performance
Chart (2025–2026)	Peak position
Australia (ARIA)	3
Australia Dance (ARIA)	1
Austria (Ö3 Austria Top 40)	4
Belarus Airplay (TopHit)	28
Belgium (Ultratop 50 Flanders)	7
Belgium (Ultratop 50 Wallonia)	5
Canada Hot 100 (Billboard)	7
Canada CHR/Top 40 (Billboard)	6
Canada Hot AC (Billboard)	28
Chile Anglo Airplay (Monitor Latino)	13
Colombia Anglo Airplay (Monitor Latino)	3
CIS Airplay (TopHit)	6
Croatia International Airplay (Top lista)	7
Czech Republic Singles Digital (ČNS IFPI)	10
Dominican Republic Anglo Airplay (Monitor Latino)	14
Ecuador Anglo Airplay (Monitor Latino)	8
Estonia Airplay (TopHit)	1
France (SNEP)	38
Germany (GfK)	3
Germany Dance (GfK)	1
Global 200 (Billboard)	17
Greece International (IFPI)	33
Honduras Anglo Airplay (Monitor Latino)	7
Hungary (Editors' Choice Top 40)	20
Iceland (Tónlistinn)	15
Ireland (IRMA)	2
Italy Airplay (EarOne)	66
Kazakhstan Airplay (TopHit)	24
Latvia Airplay (LaIPA)	1
Latvia Streaming (LaIPA)	4
Lithuania (AGATA)	9
Lithuania Airplay (TopHit)	1
Luxembourg (Billboard)	6
Malta Airplay (Radiomonitor)	2
Moldova Airplay (TopHit)	32
Netherlands (Dutch Top 40)	15
Netherlands (Single Top 100)	12
New Zealand (Recorded Music NZ)	5
Norway (IFPI Norge)	21
Panama Anglo Airplay (Monitor Latino)	7
Paraguay Anglo Airplay (Monitor Latino)	11
Peru Anglo Airplay (Monitor Latino)	13
Poland (Polish Airplay Top 100)	23
Poland (Polish Streaming Top 100)	28
Portugal (AFP)	63
Russia Airplay (TopHit)	10
Serbia Airplay (Radiomonitor)	17
Slovakia Airplay (ČNS IFPI)	10
Slovakia Singles Digital (ČNS IFPI)	21
Suriname (Nationale Top 40)	19
Sweden (Sverigetopplistan)	11
Switzerland (Schweizer Hitparade)	5
Turkey International Airplay (Radiomonitor Türkiye)	6
Ukraine Airplay (TopHit)	80
UK Singles (Official Charts)	2
UK Dance (Official Charts)	1
US Billboard Hot 100	36
US Adult Pop Airplay (Billboard)	38
US Hot Dance/Electronic Songs (Billboard)	1
US Pop Airplay (Billboard)	15
Venezuela Anglo Airplay (Monitor Latino)	5

==== Monthly charts ====
Monthly chart performance
Chart (2025)	Peak position
Belarus Airplay (TopHit)	31
CIS Airplay (TopHit)	8
Estonia Airplay (TopHit)	1
Kazakhstan Airplay (TopHit)	30
Latvia Airplay (TopHit)	1
Lithuania Airplay (TopHit)	3
Moldova Airplay (TopHit)	44
Russia Airplay (TopHit)	12

==== Year-end charts ====
Year-end chart performance
Chart (2025)	Position
Australia (ARIA)	17
Austria (Ö3 Austria Top 40)	37
Belgium (Ultratop 50 Flanders)	58
Belgium (Ultratop 50 Wallonia)	79
Canada (Canadian Hot 100)	52
Canada CHR/Top 40 (Billboard)	95
CIS Airplay (TopHit)	72
Estonia Airplay (TopHit)	12
Germany (GfK)	53
Global 200 (Billboard)	188
Latvia Airplay (TopHit)	3
Lithuania Airplay (TopHit)	14
Netherlands (Dutch Top 40)	82
Netherlands (Single Top 100)	83
New Zealand (Recorded Music NZ)	20
Russia Airplay (TopHit)	81
Switzerland (Schweizer Hitparade)	56
UK Singles (OCC)	35
US Hot Dance/Electronic Songs (Billboard)	3

=== Certifications ===
Certifications and sales
Region	Certification	Certified units/sales
Australia (ARIA)	6× Platinum	420,000^{‡}
Denmark (IFPI Danmark)	Gold	45,000^{‡}
France (SNEP)	Diamond	333,333^{‡}
Italy (FIMI)	Gold	100,000^{‡}
Poland (ZPAV)	Platinum	125,000^{‡}
Portugal (AFP)	Gold	12,000^{‡}
Spain (Promusicae)	Gold	50,000^{‡}
United Kingdom (BPI)	2× Platinum	1,200,000^{‡}
Streaming
Czech Republic (ČNS IFPI)	Platinum	5,000,000^{†}
Greece (IFPI Greece)	Gold	1,000,000^{†}
Slovakia (ČNS IFPI)	Platinum	1,700,000^{†}
^{‡} Sales+streaming figures based on certification alone.^{†} Streaming-only figures based on certification alone.
