= Disco Lines =

American DJ and producer (born 1999)

- Born: Thadeus Francis Labuszewski; January 26, 1999 (age 27); Boulder, Colorado, U.S.
- Genres: Tech house; future bass; deep house; trap
- Occupations: DJ; record producer; songwriter
- Years active: 2019–present
- Labels: Arista; Insomniac; Good Good
- Website: discolines.com

Thadeus Francis Labuszewski (born January 26, 1999), known professionally as Disco Lines, is an American musician, DJ, music producer, and songwriter. He gained major recognition in 2022 with his single "Baby Girl"; he achieved further success with his remix of Tinashe's song "No Broke Boys", which topped the US Hot Dance/Electronic Songs chart and became his first song to enter the Billboard Hot 100.

== Early life ==
Disco Lines was raised in Colorado and graduated from University of Colorado Boulder. He started EDM in middle school when he heard Skrillex's Scary Monsters and Nice Sprites.

== Career ==
In 2020, Disco Lines released a remix of Taylor Swift's "Love Story" that went viral on TikTok.

On April 14, 2022, Disco Lines released "Baby Girl" his first single since signing with Arista Records. The song debuted number 25 on the Billboard Dance/Electronic Songs chart. Disco Lines started his own record label, Good Good Records in June 2023. Wes Mills became the first artist signed to the new label.

In May 2025, Disco Lines shared a snippet of a remix to Tinashe's 2024 song "No Broke Boys", and the remix gained viral traction on TikTok. Released on June 6, the remix became a global hit and reached the top five in several countries including the United Kingdom, Australia, New Zealand, Belgium and Germany. The song charted at number 39 on the Billboard Hot 100, marking Disco Line's first and Tinashe's sixth overall entry on the chart. It also reached number 1 on the US Hot Dance/Electronic Songs chart.

== Awards and nominations ==
Year	Awards	Category	Work	Outcome	Ref.
2026	iHeartRadio Music Awards	Dance Song of the Year	No Broke Boys (with Tinashe)	Won	
2026	BRIT Awards	International Song of the Year	No Broke Boys (with Tinashe)	Nominated	
2026	Queerty Awards	Anthem	No Broke Boys (with Tinashe)	Nominated	
2026	American Music Awards	Social Song of the Year	No Broke Boys (with Tinashe)	Nominated	
2026	Electronic Dance Music Awards (EDM Awards)	Dance Radio Song of the Year	No Broke Boys (with Tinashe)	Won	
2026	Electronic Dance Music Awards (EDM Awards)	Remix of the Year	No Broke Boys (AVELLO Remix) (with Tinashe)	Won	

== Discography ==
=== Extended plays ===
List of extended plays, with release date and label shown
Title	Details
Loveland	Released: February 17, 2023; Label: Insomniac Records; Format: Digital download, streaming

=== Singles ===
List of singles, with selected chart positions
Title	Year	Peak chart positions						Certifications	Album
Title	Year	US	US Dance	AUS	CAN	UK	NZ	Certifications	Album
"Honey" (featuring Gabriella)	2019	—	—	—	—	—	—		Non-album singles
"Rosetta"	2019	—	—	—	—	—	—		Non-album singles
"Acid Cowboy"	2019	—	—	—	—	—	—		Non-album singles
"Alive" (featuring Lilly Corsi)	2019	—	—	—	—	—	—		Non-album singles
"Feels Like" (with Pardi)	2020	—	—	—	—	—	—		Non-album singles
"Is This Love"	2020	—	—	—	—	—	—		Non-album singles
"Misbehaving" (featuring Lilly Corsi)	2020	—	—	—	—	—	—		Non-album singles
"Love Story" (featuring Cassidi)	2020	—	—	—	—	—	—		Non-album singles
"All I Want Is You"	2021	—	—	—	—	—	—		Non-album singles
"Who Do You Love?"	2021	—	—	—	—	—	—		Non-album singles
"Younger" (with Riley Biederer)	2021	—	—	—	—	—	—		Non-album singles
"Destiny" (with Kiana Zara and Seth Charleston)	2022	—	—	—	—	—	—		Non-album singles
"Can We Get Away Tonight" (with Demotapes featuring Anthony Russo)	2022	—	—	—	—	—	—		Non-album singles
"Techno + Tequila" (featuring Morgan Harvill)	2022	—	—	—	—	—	—		Non-album singles
"Baby Girl"	2022	—	25	—	32	86	—	RIAA: Gold; BPI: Gold; RMNZ: Platinum	Non-album singles
"Restless Bones"	2022	—	—	—	—	—	—		Non-album singles
"Til I Die" (with Space Rangers)	2023	—	—	—	—	—	—		Non-album singles
"Another Chance"	2023	—	—	—	—	—	—		Loveland
"I See Colors" (with Rain Radio)	2023	—	—	—	—	—	—		Non-album singles
"Misbehave" (with Ship Wrek)	2023	—	—	—	—	—	—		Non-album singles
"MDMA"	2023	—	—	—	—	—	—		Non-album singles
"RWEOK?" (with Demotapes)	2023	—	—	—	—	—	—		Non-album singles
"I Got You" (with Ayokay)	2023	—	—	—	—	—	—		Non-album singles
"Heartbreak Hangover" (with Justin Jay)	2023	—	—	—	—	—	—		Non-album singles
"Blurring the Lines" (with Miggy Dela Rosa)	2023	—	—	—	—	—	—		Non-album singles
"Peace of Mind" (with Ship Wrek and Daya)	2023	—	—	—	—	—	—		Non-album singles
"Where Do I Belong?" (with Ship Wrek)	2023	—	—	—	—	—	—		Non-album singles
"Cutting Loose" (with J. Worra and Anabel Englund)	2024	—	—	—	—	—	—		Non-album singles
"Disco Boy"	2024	—	—	—	—	—	—		Non-album singles
"Give It to Me Good" (with Sidepiece)	2024	—	—	—	—	—	—		Non-album singles
"Back2u" (with Gudfella)	2024	—	—	—	—	—	—		Non-album singles
"Magnet" (with Gryffin and MAX)	2024	—	—	—	—	—	—		Non-album singles
"11 Mast" (with Wes Mills)	2024	—	—	—	—	—	—		Non-album singles
"Shine" (with Wes Mills)	2024	—	—	—	—	—	—		Non-album singles
"Feel It" (with Pluko)	2024	—	—	—	—	—	—		Non-album singles
"Caught in a Moment" (with Dillon Francis)	2024	—	—	—	—	—	—		Non-album singles
"Fuck It Up" (with Sidepiece and Mike Sherm)	2024	—	—	—	—	—	—		Non-album singles
"Wide Open" (with No/Me)	2025	—	—	—	—	—	—		Non-album singles
"Wide Open (Acoustic Version)" (with No/Me)	2025	—	—	—	—	—	—		Non-album singles
"Sunny" (with Gudfella)	2025	—	—	—	—	—	—		Non-album singles
"Swim" (with Felly)	2025	—	—	—	—	—	—		Non-album singles
"No Broke Boys" (Remix) (with Tinashe)	2025	36	1	7	3	2	5	ARIA: 2× Platinum; BPI: 2× Platinum; RMNZ: 3× Platinum; IFPI: Gold; SNEP: Platinum; AFP: Gold	Quantum Baby
"I Don't Trust a Soul" (with Ship Wrek)	2025	—	—	—	—	—	—		Non-album singles
"Cocaine in My Blunts"	2025	—	—	—	—	—	—		Non-album singles
"Don't Kill the Party" (with Ty Dolla Sign featuring Shoreline Mafia, Quavo and Juicy J)	2025	—	—	—	—	—	—		Non-album singles
Starlight" (with Wes Mills featuring Madeline Follin)	2026	—	—	—	—	—	—		Non-album singles
"Quickest Routes" (with Shoreline Mafia, OhGeesy and Fenix Flexin)	2026	—	—	—	—	—	—		Disco Mafia Pack
