= Tinashe =

American singer (born 1993)

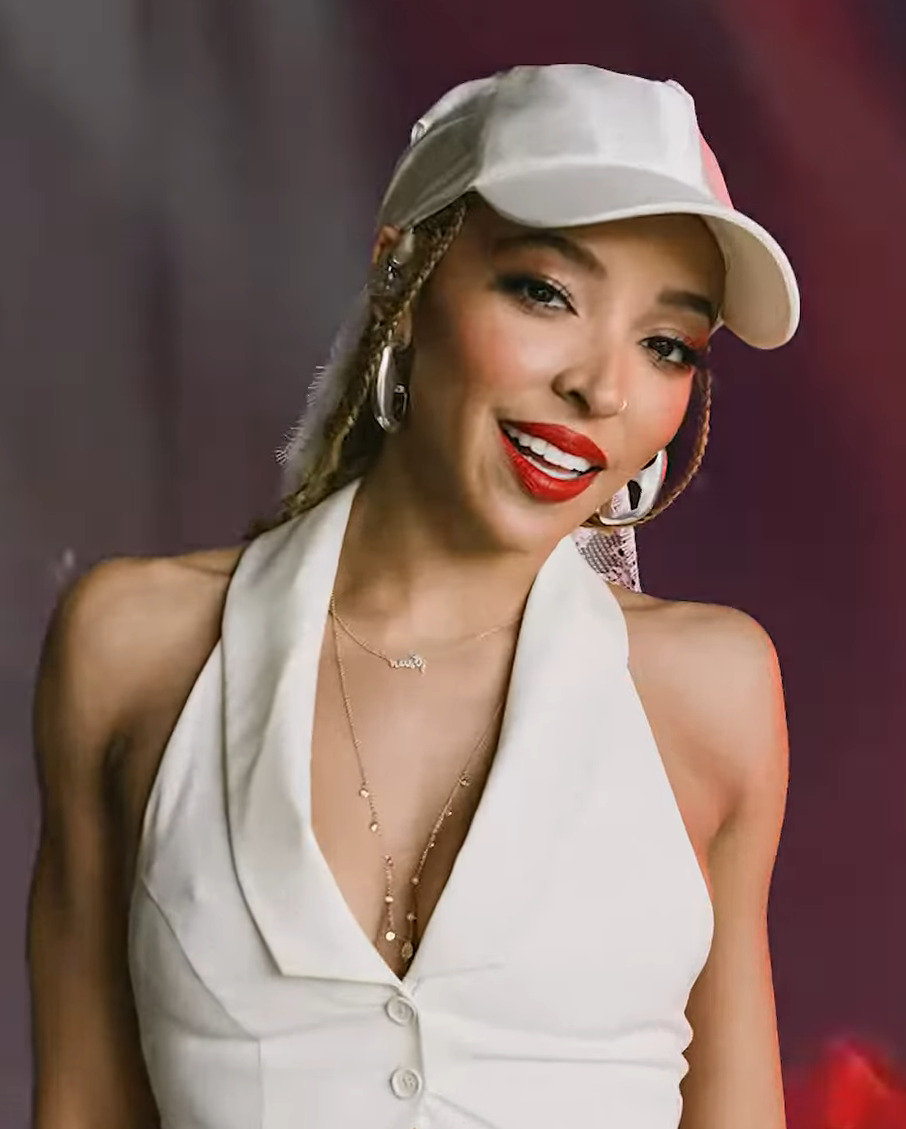
- Tinashe in 2024
- Born: Tinashe Jorgensen Kachingwe; February 6, 1993 (age 33); Lexington, Kentucky, US
- Occupations: Singer; songwriter; dancer; actress
- Years active: 2000–present
- Works: Discography
- Musical career
- Origin: Pasadena, California, US
- Genres: R&B; pop; alternative R&B
- Instrument: Vocals
- Labels: RCA; Nice Life; Atlantic
- Formerly of: The Stunners
- Website: tinashenow.com

Tinashe Jorgensen Kachingwe (/tiːˈnɑːʃeɪ/ tee-NAH-shay; born February 6, 1993) is an American singer, songwriter, dancer, and actress. Born in Lexington, Kentucky, she moved to Pasadena, California to begin her career as a child actress, before later expanding into music. From 2007 to 2011, Tinashe was a member of the girl group the Stunners. After the group disbanded, she released her first solo mixtapes: In Case We Die (2012), Reverie (2012), and Black Water (2013).

After signing with RCA Records, Tinashe released her debut studio album, Aquarius (2014), which marked her first appearance on the Billboard Hot 100 with its lead single "2 On" (featuring Schoolboy Q). Her subsequent albums, Nightride (2016) and Joyride (2018), peaked at number 89 and number 58, respectively, on the Billboard 200. Following her departure from RCA, Tinashe released Songs for You (2019), 333 (2021), and BB/Ang3l (2023) as an independent artist, with all three albums failing to chart within the top 100. Her seventh studio album, Quantum Baby (2024), achieved moderate commercial success with the singles "Nasty" and "No Broke Boys". Her eighth studio album, Popstar, became her first to reach the top ten in the United States.

== Early life ==
Tinashe Jorgensen Kachingwe was born on February 6, 1993, in Lexington, Kentucky, and is the eldest child of college professors Michael and Aimie Kachingwe. Her father is a professor who teaches acting at California State Polytechnic University, Pomona, and a first-generation Zimbabwean immigrant of Shona descent, while her mother, who is of Danish, Norwegian, and Irish descent, teaches physical therapy at California State University, Northridge. They met each other on a blind date during their time as undergrads at the University of Iowa. Tinashe, whose name means "We have God," (or "God is with us") in the Shona language, has two younger brothers, Thulani and Kudzai.

As a child, Tinashe lived in DeKalb, Illinois, and moved to Los Angeles, California with her family. She attended Crescenta Valley High School for a year before finishing early to pursue a career in music full-time. During high school, she faced bullying from her peers. She began studying ballet, tap, and jazz dancing at the age of 4, continuing to compete in various styles as a part of a dance company until she was 18.

== Career ==
=== 2000–2011: The Stunners and acting roles ===
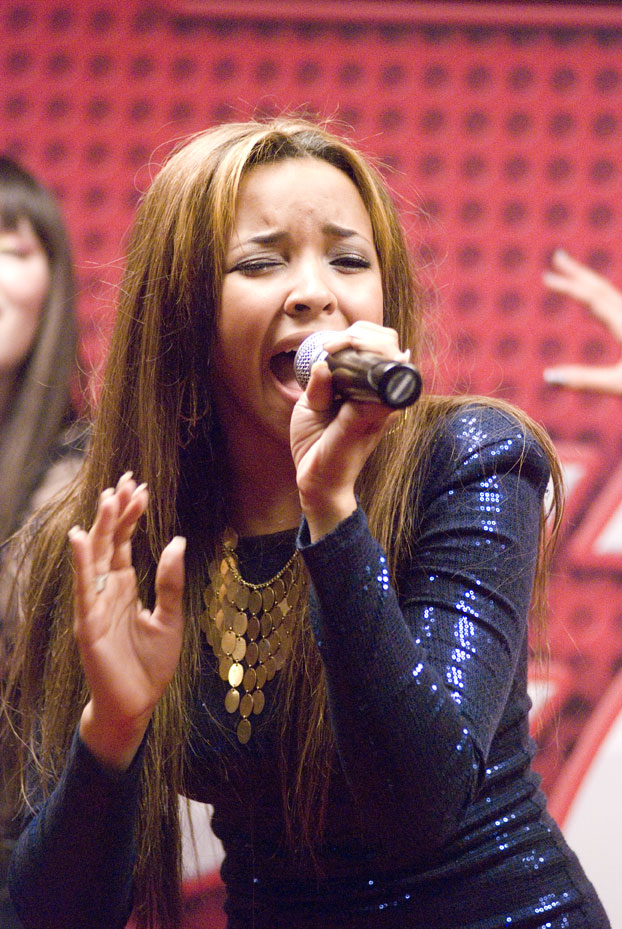
Tinashe in 2010

Tinashe scored roles in a number of TV shows, movies, and children's videos in the 2000s, starting with the film Cora Unashamed in October 2000. She followed this with Call Me Claus (2001), Masked and Anonymous (2003), and two TV series: Rocket Power (2004) and Avatar: The Last Airbender (2007). She also made a regular role in the Cartoon Network TV series Out of Jimmy's Head in 2007–2008 and a recurring role on Two and a Half Men in 2008–2009. Although she was uncredited in the poorly received Masked and Anonymous, American film critic Roger Ebert praised her performance at the film's 2003 Sundance Film Festival premiere, describing her rendition of "The Times They Are A-Changin'" as being delivered with "sweetness and conviction".

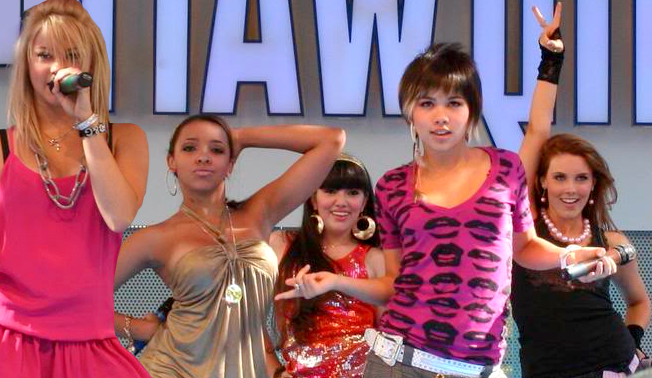
Tinashe with The Stunners in 2009

In 2007, Tinashe joined girl group the Stunners, founded by American singer Vitamin C. Tinashe's bandmates were Marisol Esparza, Allie Gonino, Hayley Kiyoko, and Kelsey Sanders. Six months after their formation, the group signed with Columbia Records and later signed a production deal with Lionsgate Entertainment for scripted television show for MTV. In October, they released a five-song EP, influenced by artists such as Madonna, Gwen Stefani, and Rihanna. In 2009, they performed "Santa Bring My Soldier Home" on The Wendy Williams Show. After signing with Universal Republic Records, they released a single, "Dancin' Around the Truth" in 2010. The group served as an opening act on Canadian singer Justin Bieber's 2010-2011 My World Tour.

After Bieber's tour, the Stunners returned to the recording studio, but disbanded in 2011, and Tinashe began pursuing a solo career. After the group disbanded, Tinashe purchased recording equipment, including a camera and microphones, beginning to teach herself how to record and mix music. She wrote and recorded songs in her room studio, while she produced beats with Logic Pro, filmed and edited her own music videos with Pro Tools and Final Cut Pro. Tinashe cited YouTube as her "teacher". On June 24, she released her first solo music video, a cover of American rapper Lil Wayne's single, "How to Love". The song was later released as a free digital download via her official website. Tinashe was featured on her debut single, "Artificial People", by American production team OFM, released on September 12. On November 25, she released a music video for "Can't Say No", her first original solo song; which sampled the instrumental of the Britney Spears song, "Blur". It was released for digital download on November 28.

=== 2012–2014: Independent mixtapes, record deal and Aquarius ===
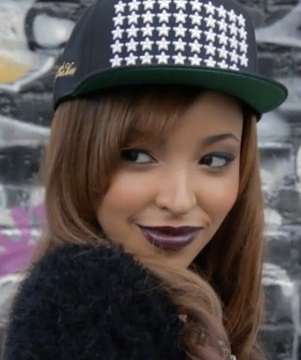
Tinashe in 2013

In Case We Die, Tinashe's debut solo mixtape, was released in February 2012, recorded in her home studio. It spawned four singles; "Chainless" was released in December 2011, alongside the music video. "My High" was released for streaming through her official website, and "This Feeling"'s music video, directed by Cole Walliser, was released on May 1, 2012, to Global Grind. The mixtape's final single, "Boss", was released August 20, after being featured in an episode of the VH1 series Single Ladies; its music video was self-directed. On July 13, Tinashe announced that she had signed with RCA Records. Following the record deal, her second mixtape Reverie was released on that year, through her official website. It spawned three singles, "Stargazing", "Ecstasy", and "Who Am I Working For?". On November 26, 2013, Tinashe released her third mixtape, Black Water, composed of thirteen tracks produced by Dev Hynes, Boi-1da, Ryan Hemsworth, and Tinashe herself. American rapper Travis Scott features on the single "Vulnerable".

Tinashe had worked on her debut studio album in 2014, and its recording took place in Los Angeles, London, Atlanta, New York, and Toronto. She also worked with various producers including Clams Casino, Ryan Hemsworth, Stuart Matthewman, DJ Mustard, T-Minus, Mike Will Made It, Boi-1da, Fisticuffs, Best Kept Secret, Ritz Reynolds, and London on da Track. On January 13, she released her first solo single from her debut studio album, "2 On". Produced by DJ Mustard, the song features American rapper Schoolboy Q. It entered the US Billboard Hot 100 chart at number 89, peaking at number 24. On June 29, Tinashe made her national television debut, performing "2 On" at the BET Awards pre-show. Her debut studio album, Aquarius, was released on October 7; about its theme, Tinashe said that it would combine elements of her previous work while reflecting her artistic growth, adding that it "embodies who I am and where I am creatively right now". The album's second single, "Pretend" featuring ASAP Rocky, was released on August 22. Upon the album's release, Aquarius debuted at number 17 on Billboard 200 with 18,800 copies sold in its first week. "All Hands on Deck" became the last single off of the album on February 24, 2015. In January, Tinashe made her first fashion magazine cover appearance for V magazine.

=== 2015–2018: Nightride and Joyride ===
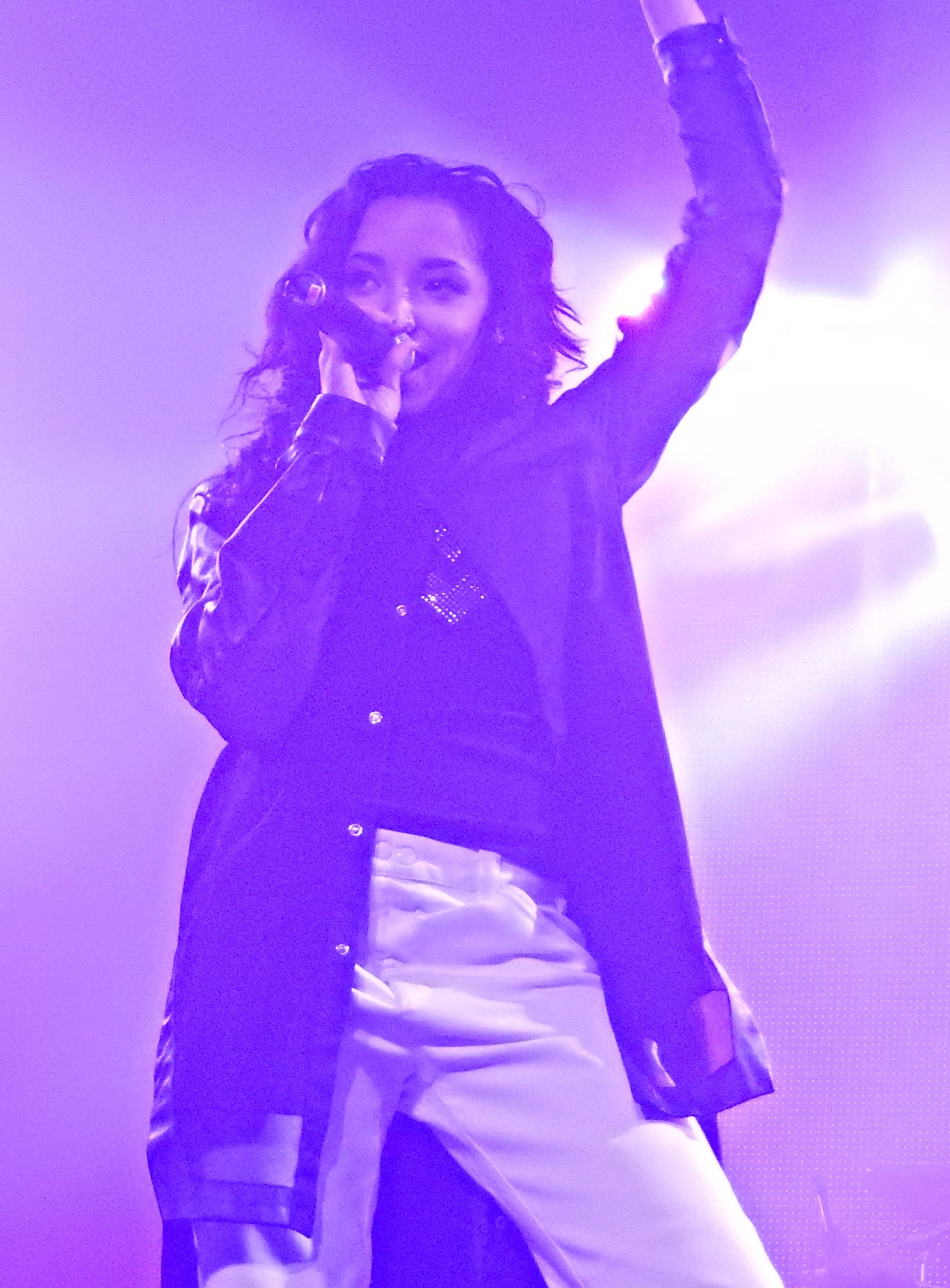
Tinashe performing in 2015

On March 16, 2015, Tinashe released a seven-song mixtape entitled Amethyst for free download; it was recorded in her bedroom during her Christmas vacation and features production from Ryan Hemsworth, Iamsu!, DJ Dahi, Smash David, Ritz Reynolds, Nez & Rio, and Mae N. Maejor. In between time, she invested in several self-directed music videos from Aquarius: "Aquarius", "Bated Breath", "Cold Sweat", and "Bet/Feels Like Vegas". In September, Tinashe released a teaser for her then-second studio album Joyride through YouTube. (Note: Joyride was set to be Tinashe's second studio album, and Nightride, released prior to Joyride, would be her mixtape. However, she later confirmed that Nightride was her second studio album.) She told Rolling Stone that the title reflected her evolving career, describing it as feeling like "an adventure, a journey, a ride". She also said that despite her efforts to grow her fan base, she felt "underappreciated" and "undervalued", while viewing the release as an opportunity for listeners to rediscover her. Same month, Tinashe leaked a buzz single, "Party Favors" featuring American rapper Young Thug, as a way to get the ball rolling from her label. On October 2, she released another song "Player", featuring American singer Chris Brown. On October 21, Tinashe was featured on British electronic duo Snakeships's track "All My Friends", which also featured American rapper Chance the Rapper. In the summer of 2015, Tinashe joined Trinidadian rapper Nicki Minaj's US concert, the Pinkprint Tour. In September and October, Tinashe toured South America with American singer Katy Perry on the Prismatic World Tour.

Tinashe announced the Joyride World Tour on January 12, 2016, in support of Joyride. Beginning in February, it was scheduled through May including dates in North America, Europe, Asia, and Oceania. However, the tour was ultimately canceled as she wanted to focus on making new songs for the album. On February 2, she revealed another promotional single, "Ride of Your Life". The same month, Canadian cosmetic company MAC Cosmetics announced a limited-edition collaboration with Tinashe for its #MACFutureForward campaign, along with singers Halsey, Lion Babe, and Dej Loaf. In April, Tinashe debutted on radio station Hot 97's Summer Jam main stage during the summer. On July 15, she released a single "Superlove", and its music video, directed by Hannah Lux Davis and filmed in Malibu, California, made its debut in August. In September, Tinashe performed her new song "Company" on MTV's Wonderland. Unlike her previous work, it was written by American singer the-Dream, without Tinashe as co-writer. She was confirmed working with Britney Spears for a remix version of Spears's song, "Slumber Party" in October. Designer brand Alexander Wang was collaborating with Tinashe in a video for its Fall 2016 campaign. On November 4, she released a digital album and short film, titled Nightride, which she said had been in production for two years alongside Joyride. Rolling Stone described the album as "dark, alluring and dangerous".

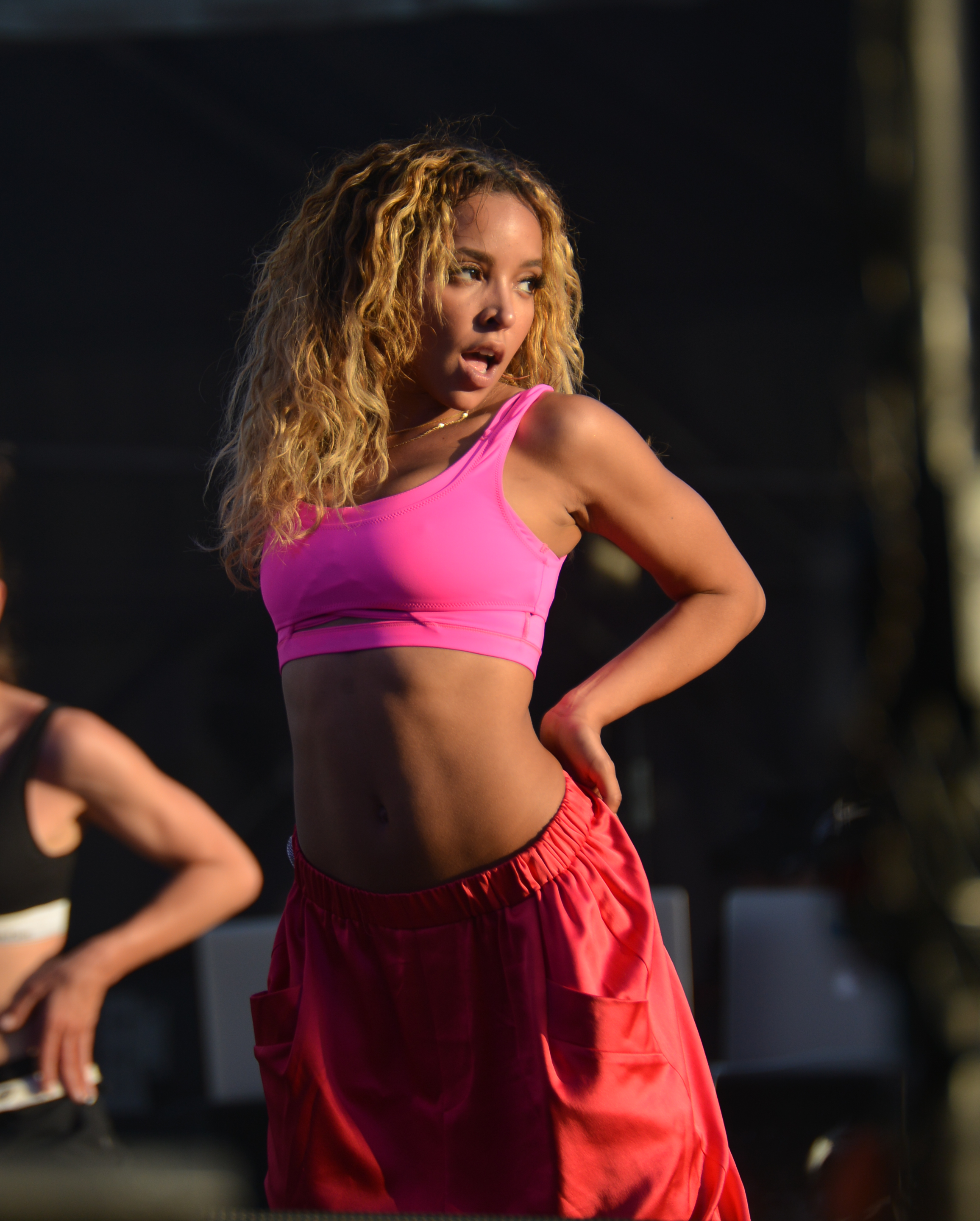
Tinashe performing at the 2017 Capital Pride Festival

In March 2017, Tinashe joined American band Maroon 5's tenth headlining tour, Maroon V Tour. The same month, Pepsi, in association with iHeartMedia, Shazam, and Viacom, announced that Tinashe would join its music platform, the Sound Drop. On March 16, Tinashe premiered a new single, "Flame". Following its release, she appeared in the new season of Empire, and performed "America the Beautiful" as part of an event WrestleMania 33 in Orlando. In June, Tinashe appeared at two concerts with American singer Aaron Carter at Hot 107.9's Birthday Bash. In April 2018, Tinashe released her third album Joyride, which was preceded by two singles: "No Drama" featuring American rapper Offset and "Faded Love" featuring American rapper Future. The album received generally favorable reviews from critics and debuted at number 58 on the US Billboard 200.

=== 2018–2020: Television, departure from RCA, and Songs for You ===
On June 9, 2018, American record producer Hitmaka revealed his role as executive producer on Tinashe's then-upcoming album, titled Nashe. Its lead single was "Like I Used To", released on July 13, and its second single was "Throw a Fit", released on July 26 with the album's cover as the single artwork. In August, rumors of Nashe being canceled circulated the internet, with further speculation being followed after Tinashe posted a screenshot of a page error from RCA's website on Instagram. On September 12, Tinashe was announced as one of the celebrities who would compete on season 27 of Dancing with the Stars; her professional partner was American dancer Brandon Armstrong. Despite consistently receiving high scores, they were the fourth couple to be eliminated from the competition on October 15. In the same month, Tinashe performed at Austin City Limits Festival.

Fox announced a live adaptation of the musical Rent, as Rent: Live, in which Tinashe portrayed the lead female role of Mimi Marquez, an exotic dancer who struggled with addiction and HIV. Promotional videos and series of pictures were released featuring Tinashe and other cast members in rehearsal and costumes during the lead up to the airing. As a fan of the musical since middle school, she told Us Weekly on her role and the musical overall: "It still has a lot of the topics that are definitely not necessarily children topics, but I think it's important because they're very relevant and we deal with them in a beautiful, awesome, fun, exciting way." The musical aired on Fox on January 27, 2019, and the television special received five Primetime Emmy Awards.

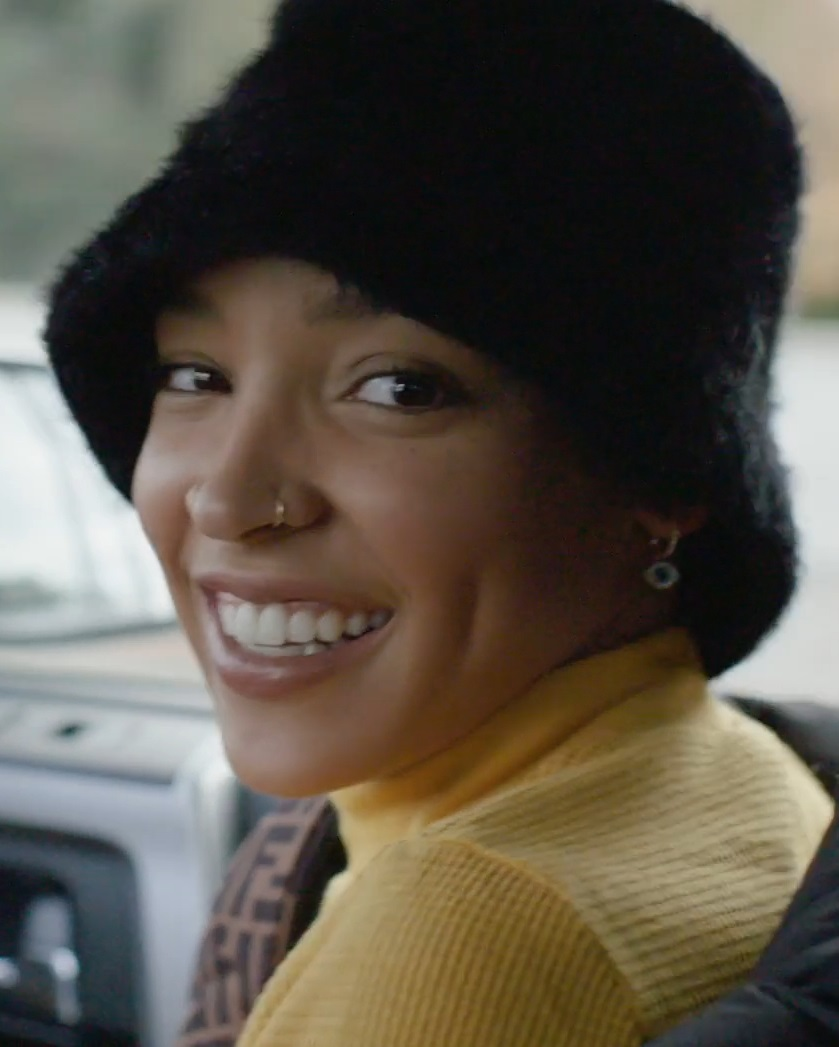
Tinashe in 2020

In February 2019, Tinashe's manager announced she had parted ways with RCA, stating that the "positive split" was "giving her back creative control". After her departure, HotNewHipHop published a report believing she was in the midst of being courted by multiple major labels. She signed a management deal with Roc Nation on November 7. On November 20, she released her first self-released studio album, Songs for You. It was described by The Cut magazine's Kerensa Cadenas as "excellent", with The Wall Street Journal's Ben Dandridge-Lemco suggesting that it was "tough to find a negative review about the project anywhere". Commercially, Songs for You reached number 147 on the US Billboard 200.

On July 17, 2020, nearly eight months after the release of Songs for You, Tinashe released the single "Rascal (Superstar)". In August, she confirmed that she would be featured on Australian rapper Iggy Azalea's single, "Dance Like Nobody's Watching"; it marked their second collaboration, after 2015's "All Hands on Deck" remix. On November 25, Tinashe surprise released a Christmas EP, Comfort & Joy, co-produced with her younger brother Quiet Child.

=== 2021–2023: 333 and BB/Ang3l ===
On May 28, 2021, Tinashe posted a cryptic teaser for her then upcoming fifth studio album through her social media accounts. The teaser included the caption "333", which was speculated to be the title for the album, along with a new logo designed by Franc Fernandez. Its lead single, "Pasadena", was released on June 4, featuring American rapper Buddy. On July 9, Tinashe released the album's second single, "Bouncin'". Following the release, she announced its accompanying tour, 333 Tour, on July 12, which began in September. On July 22, Tinashe revealed the release date of 333 as August 6, releasing the song "I Can See the Future" the same day. The album was acclaimed by music critics. Meanwhile, the song and its music video for "Bouncin'" gathered a lot of media attention, with the likes of British girl group Little Mix and American rapper Doja Cat expressing their love for the song. In July, Tinashe was announced as one of the guests to appear on the rebooted MTV Cribs. The year ended with the announcement of her new Facebook Watch show Choreo Cage Fight, premiering on December 3.

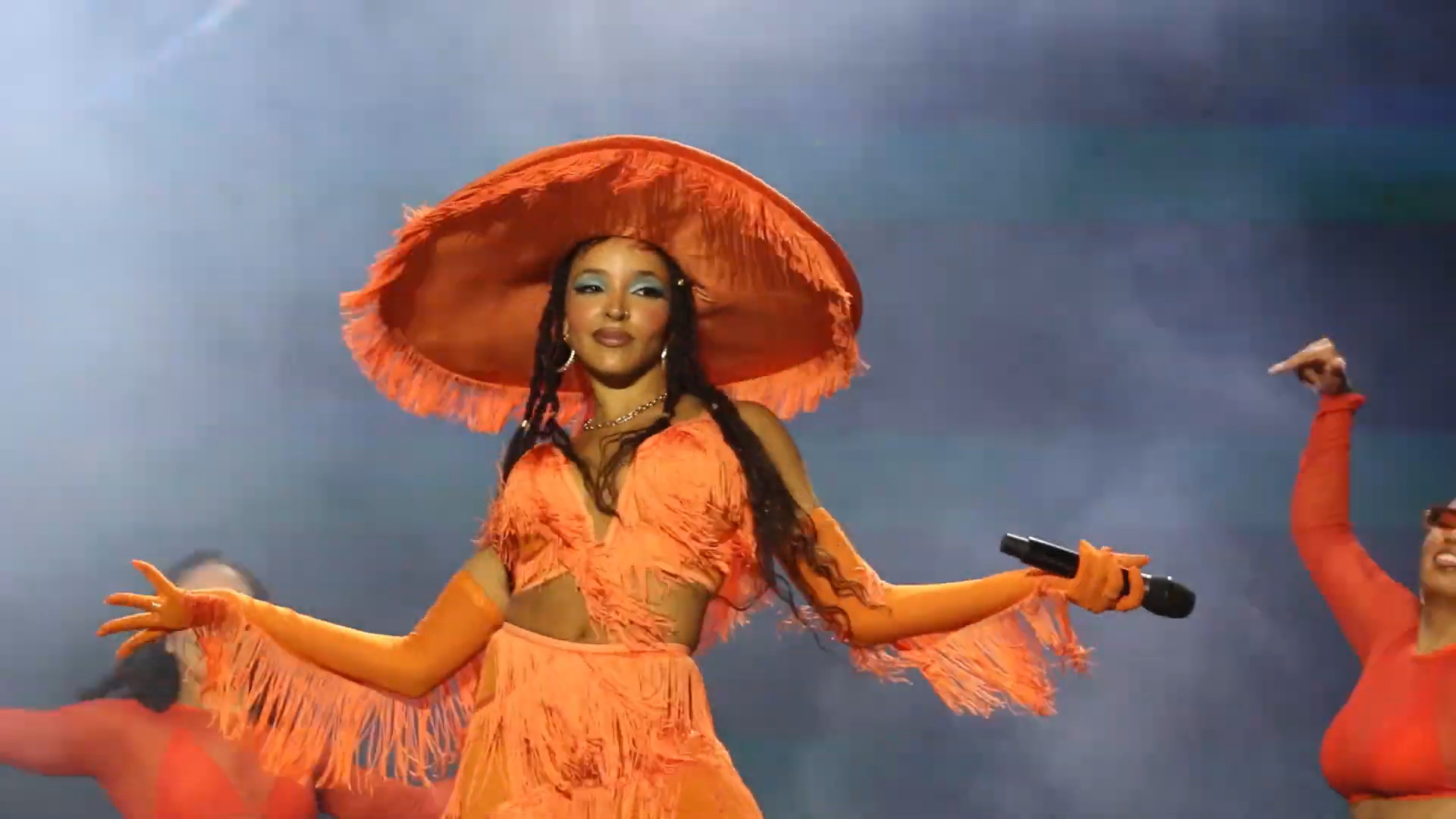
Tinashe performing at Festival Grls! in São Paulo in 2023

For 2022, Tinashe was named in Forbes magazine's 30 Under 30 list. On February 22, Australian musician Flume announced his tour, Palaces World Tour, which Tinashe joined as a supporting act. On July 29, Scottish singer Calvin Harris released the fourth single of his sixth studio album Funk Wav Bounces Vol. 2 (2022), "New to You", along with Tinashe, Normani, and Offset. In January 2023, Tinashe made a guest appearance in the film adaptation of House Party, alongside Jacob Latimore, Mya, Kid Cudi, & LeBron James. She was also cast in the reality-competition series Stars on Mars, which premiered on June 5, hosted by American actor William Shatner among other "celebronauts" where she finished as runner-up. On July 21, Tinashe released "Talk to Me Nice", the first single from her then upcoming sixth studio album, BB/Ang3l. On August 18, she released its second single, "Needs". She released the album on September 8. She toured the United States in support of the album from January to February 2024.

=== 2024–2025: "Nasty", Quantum Baby and "No Broke Boys" ===
Tinashe performing at Ace of Space during her Match My Freak Tour

In January 2024, Tinashe was announced as part of the lineup for festival Coachella, performing both weekends in April. She performed on NPR Tiny Desk on February 9. On April 12, Tinashe released the single "Nasty", as the lead single for her then upcoming seventh album. The song achieved viral success after appearing in a dance video on TikTok. On June 12, she performed the song on Jimmy Kimmel Live!. It peaked at number 61 on the Billboard Hot 100 and reached number 1 on the US Rhythmic Radio Chart, marking her second number one. "Nasty" was named TikTok's number 1 Song of the Summer in the United Kingdom and number 2 in global.

On August 16, Tinashe released her seventh studio album, Quantum Baby, part two of a three-album trilogy starting with BB/Ang3l; Quantum Baby received positive reviews from critics. In support the album, she embarked on the 2024–2025 Match My Freak: World Tour, spanning across North America, Europe, Australia and Asia.

In May 2025, American DJ Disco Lines shared a snippet of a remix to Tinashe's 2024 song "No Broke Boys", and the remix gained viral traction on TikTok. Released on June 6, the remix peaked at number 36 on the Hot 100 and number 2 on the UK singles chart and became a global hit. It also reached number 1 on the US Hot Dance/Electronic Songs chart.

=== 2026–present: Popstar ===
In April 2026, Tinashe began teasing her then upcoming single during her DJ set at Coachella. On June 5, she released "Too Easy" as the lead single of her eighth studio album. The second single, "Crash Out", followed on July 16; Tinashe simultaneously announced the release date and cover art of her eighth studio album, Popstar. She further released the singles "Melatonin" and "Pillow Fight" ahead of the album. On November 16, 2026, it was announced that "Melatonin" was nominated for Best Dance/Electronic Recording and "Too Easy" was nominated for Best Dance Pop Recording at the 2027 Grammy Awards.

Popstar was released on September 25 with 16 songs through Nice Life Recording Company and Atlantic Records. The album saw commercial success: the album debuted at number 6 on the Billboard 200, becoming her first top 10 album in the United States, reached the top ten in Australia, and the top 40 in several countries including the UK, New Zealand, and Scotland. The album received widespread acclaim from critics as well, with many publications citing it as her best work thus far and claiming the album is "the best pop album of the year."

Tinashe is scheduled to embark on the North American The Show Must Go On tour in 2027.

== Artistry ==
I write a lot of it in my car, that's just a very inspiring place to listen to music. I think it puts me in the zone. I just think of melodies usually and then lyrics come after. Sometimes really easily, and then sometimes I'll have a melody for a week before I come up with any lyrics so it just kind of depends.

— Tinashe, speaking on her writing style in 2013

Tinashe's musical style has been described as R&B, pop, and alternative R&B. (Note: Musical styles: R&B; pop; alternative R&B) She said that she writes her songs and is open to writing collaborations with other artists. Her writing draws from personal experiences and those of people around her, as she places herself in others' perspectives. She also explores broader societal themes, often approaching them from a "philosophical standpoint". Her mixtapes have been more experimental, incorporating elements of traditional R&B, electro-hop, and dark pop.

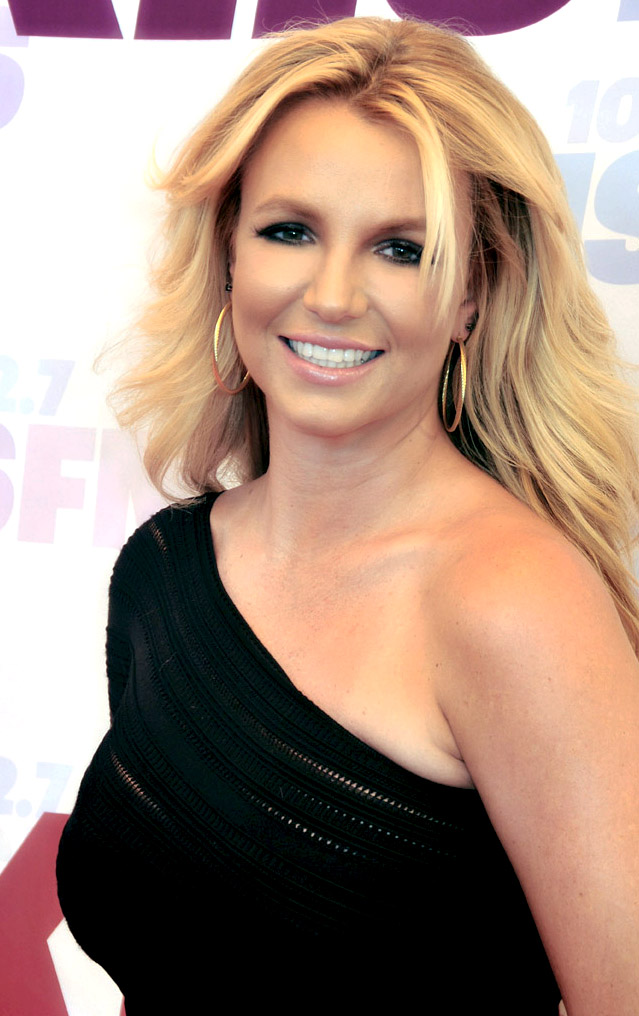
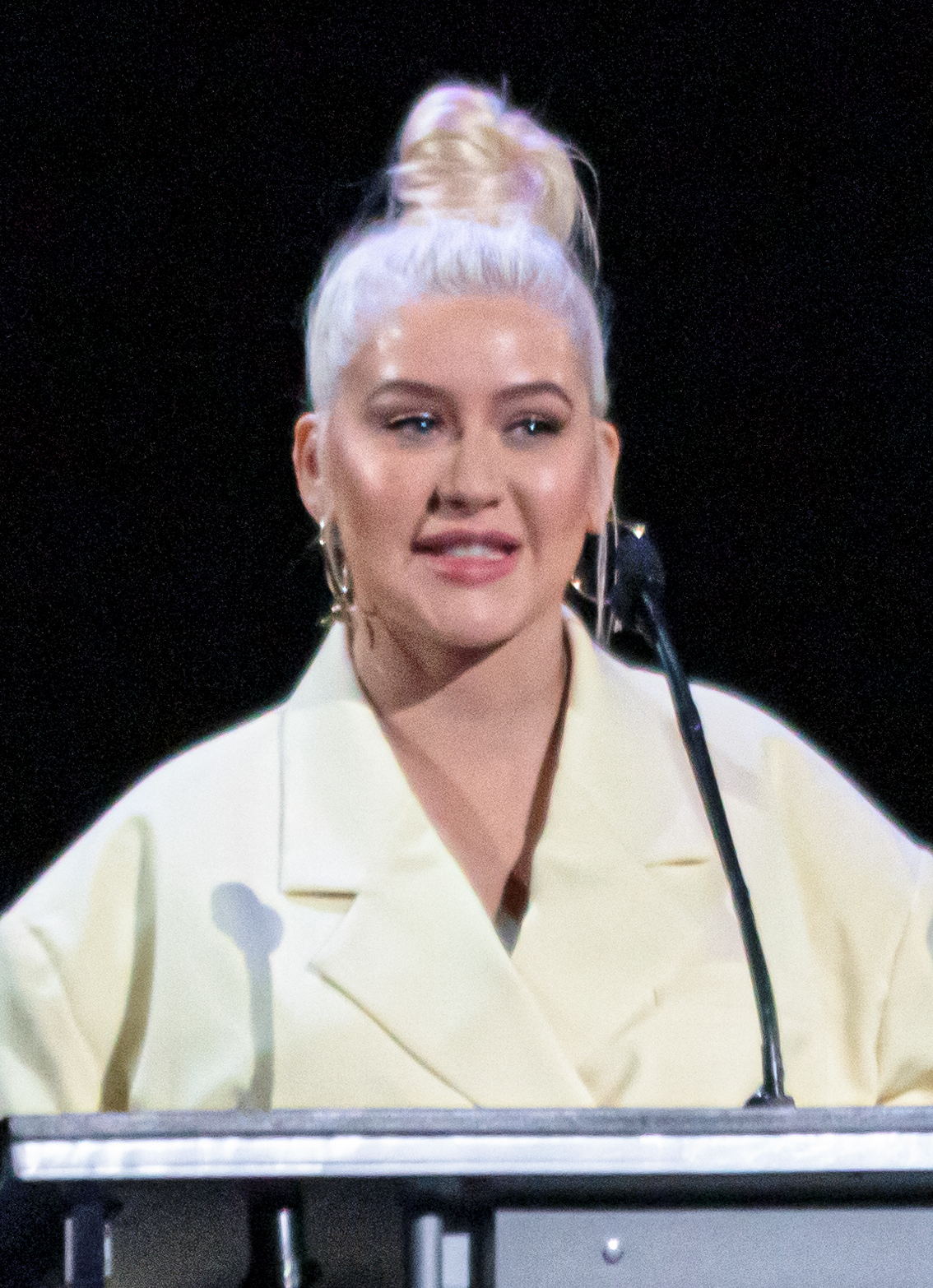
Tinashe has stated musicians such as American singers Britney Spears (left) and Christina Aguilera (right) as her influences.

Regarding her musical style, she draws inspiration from R&B, hip-hop, and alternative music. In 2016, Tinashe said she felt she did not "fit into any particular genre". She later said she considered herself as "a pop artist" who creates "R&B-tinged pop music". Tinashe's style has been compared to various singers, namely Janet Jackson, Aaliyah, James Blake, and Mya. Tinashe was inspired by the music that her parents would play in the house when she was young. She considered Ciara, Britney Spears, Michael Jackson, Janet Jackson, Sade, Christina Aguilera, James Blake, the xx, and SBTRKT as significant influences on her.

Aquarius explores several genres, namely alternative R&B, R&B, and pop, while Amethyst focuses on alternative R&B sound. Unlike those albums, Nightride features dreamy R&B production, while Tinashe emphasizes fewer pop-oriented hooks and a more experimental approach in Joyride compared to Aquarius and Nightride. Songs for You adopts R&B as well as G-funk, 1980s pop, acoustic, drum-and-bass, and trap elements. Christmas EP Comfort & Joy incorporates R&B and trap-pop, while 333 features more elements of pop. BB/Ang3l, the first part of her trilogy, is an electronic-R&B album, and the second part of Quantum Baby is an experimental R&B record.

== Personal life ==
Tinashe lives in a house in the Hollywood Hills, where she has a home studio. Until 2016, Tinashe resided with her family in La Crescenta, a suburb 20 miles north of Los Angeles. She was in a relationship with Australian basketball player Ben Simmons from November 2017 to May 2018. In 2020, she revealed that she is bisexual.

She has had a black belt in Taekwondo since her early teens. In June 2020, she attended the George Floyd protests in Los Angeles.

== Discography ==
- Aquarius (2014)
- Nightride (2016)
- Joyride (2018)
- Songs for You (2019)
- 333 (2021)
- BB/Ang3l (2023)
- Quantum Baby (2024)
- Popstar (2026)

== Filmography ==
Sources were adapted from TV Guide.

Films
Year	Title	Role	Notes
2000	Cora Unashamed	Josephine Jenkins	TV movie
2001	Call Me Claus	Young Lucy Cullins	TV movie
2003	Masked and Anonymous	Mrs. Brown's Daughter	
2004	Time Out	Shawnee	Short film
2004	The Polar Express	Hero Girl	Motion capture
2006	Akeelah and the Bee	Cissi	
2011	Justin Bieber: Never Say Never	Herself	
2023	House Party	Herself	

Television
Year	Title	Role	Notes
1997	Franklin		Episode: "Hurry Up, Franklin/Franklin's Bad Day"
2004	Rocket Power	Leilani Makani	Voice; episode: "Island of the Menhune"
2006–07	Holly Hobbie and Friends	Carrie Baker	Voice, main role
2007	Avatar: The Last Airbender	On Ji	Voice; episode: "The Headband"
2007–08	Out of Jimmy's Head	Robin Wheeler	Main role: Young Artist Award for Best Young Ensemble Performance in a TV Series; Nominated for Young Artist Award for Best Supporting Young Actress
2008–09	Two and a Half Men	Celeste Burnett	Recurring role; 3 episodes
2014–2024	Jimmy Kimmel Live!	Musical Guest	5 episodes
2014	Wendy Williams Show	Musical Guest	Episode: "Get on Up/Hot Topics"
2014	Soul Train Music Awards	Performer	
2014	BET Awards Pre-Show	Performer	
2015–18	Tonight Show Starring Jimmy Fallon	Musical Guest	3 episodes
2015–2023	Good Morning America	Musical Guest	6 episodes
2015	BET Awards	Performer	Janet Jackson tribute
2015	MTV Movie & TV Awards	Performer	With Ty Dolla Sign & Charli XCX
2015	Backstage Diaries	Herself	Episode: "The Neighbourhood, Troye Sivan, Tinashe, Kat Graham "
2015	Conan	Musical Guest	Episode: "Billy Gardell/Erin and Sara Foster/Tinashe"
2016	Fashion Police	Guest host	Episode: "The 2016 Grammy Awards Special"
2016	MTV Wonderland	Performer	Episode: "Tinashe, Ty Dolla $ign & BROODS"
2016	American Music Awards of 2016: Live from the Red Carpet	Host	
2017	Empire	Herself	2 episodes
2017	America's Next Top Model	Performer	Episode: "Cycle 23 Finale"
2017	WrestleMania 33	Performer	
2018	Dancing with the Stars	Contestant; Performer	
2018	Desus & Mero	Herself	1 episode
2019	Rent: Live	Mimi Márquez	Main role: Nominated for Emmy Award for Outstanding Variety Special (Live)
2019	Whose Line is it Anyway?	Herself	Episode: "Tinashe"
2020	#KidsTogether: The Nickelodeon Town Hall	Herself	COVID-19 Television special
2021	The Undefeated's a Room of our Own	Host	
2021	The Outsiders?	Herself	YouTube Originals
2021	MTV Video Music Awards: pre-show	Host (Celebrity Correspondent)	
2021	MTV Cribs	Guest	Episode: Mustard/Kathy Griffin/Tinashe
2021	Choreo Cage Fight	Host	Facebook Watch series Also Creator and Executive Producer
2021–2024	MTV Fresh Out Live	Musical Guest	2 episodes
2022	From The Top: Olympians and Rockstars	Herself	3 episodes
2022	NAACP Image Awards Nominee Announcements	Host	
2022	The Kelly Clarkson Show	Herself; Musical Guest	Episode: "Jeff Foxworthy & Tinashe"
2022	MTV Sampled	Herself	Episode: "Amsterdamned"
2023	Hell's Kitchen	Herself	Episode: "The Fab Five take flight"; with Tia Mowry
2023	The Jennifer Hudson Show	Guest	Episode: "Andie MacDowell/Tinashe"
2023	The Eric Andre Show	Guest	Episode: "Football Is Back"
2023	Stars on Mars	Contestant	Runner-up
2024	BET Awards	Performer	Usher tribute
2024	MTV Video Music Awards	Presenter	
2024	Dick Clark's New Year's Rockin' Eve	Performer	Episode: "2025"
2025	Selling Sunset	Herself	Episode: "A Diamond in the Rough"

== Stage ==
Year	Title	Role	Notes
2007	13	Cassie	Pre-Broadway season; the musical ran from January 7, 2007, through February 18, 2007, at the Mark Taper Forum in Los Angeles

== Awards and nominations ==
Year	Awards	Category	Work	Outcome	Ref.
2008	Young Artist Awards	Best Performance in a TV Series – Supporting Young Actress	Herself	Nominated	
2008	Young Artist Awards	Best Young Ensemble Performance in a TV Series	Out of Jimmy's Head	Won	
2014	Soul Train Music Awards	Best Dance Performance	"2 On" (featuring Schoolboy Q)	Nominated	
2015	YouTube Music Awards	50 Artists to Watch	Herself	Won	
2015	BET Awards	Best New Artist	Herself	Nominated	
2015	BMI R&B/Hip-Hop Awards	Most Performed R&B/Hip-Hop Songs	"2 On" (featuring Schoolboy Q)	Won	
2015	Soul Train Music Awards	Best New Artist	Herself	Nominated	
2015	African Women Awards	Star Power Award	Herself	Nominated	
2016	Ivor Novello Awards	Best Contemporary Song	"All My Friends" (with Snakehips & Chance the Rapper)	Won	
2016	Zimbabwe Achievers Awards	Special Recognition Awards	Herself	Won	
2018	Hollywood Beauty Awards	New Beauty Award	Herself	Won	
2018	Zimbabwe Achievers Awards	Music Artist of the Year	Herself	Won	
2024	Webby Awards	Music (Branded)	"Gravity" (Spotify Green Screen)	Nominated	
2024	MTV Video Music Awards	Best Trending Video	"Nasty"	Nominated	
2024	BreakTudo Awards	International Artist on the Rise	Herself	Nominated	
2024	MTV Europe Music Awards	Best R&B	Herself	Nominated	
2025	Berlin Music Video Awards	Best Editing	"Getting No Sleep"	Nominated	
2025	Hollywood Music Video Awards	Best One Take	"Uh Huh"	Won	
2025	Hollywood Music Video Awards	Best Live Performance	"Uh Huh" (Live from Vevo)	Nominated	
2025	Juno Awards	Video of the Year	"Nasty"	Nominated	
2025	Queerty Awards	Anthem	"Nasty"	Nominated	
2026	Queerty Awards	Anthem	"No Broke Boys" (with Disco Lines)	Nominated	
2026	iHeartRadio Music Awards	Dance Song of the Year	"No Broke Boys" (with Disco Lines)	Won	
2026	BRIT Awards	International Song of the Year	"No Broke Boys" (with Disco Lines)	Nominated	
2026	American Music Awards	Social Song of the Year	"No Broke Boys" (with Disco Lines)	Nominated	
2026	Electronic Dance Music Awards (EDM Awards)	Dance Radio Song of the Year	"No Broke Boys" (with Disco Lines)	Won	
2026	Electronic Dance Music Awards (EDM Awards)	Remix of the Year	"No Broke Boys" (AVELLO remix) (with Disco Lines)	Won	
2027	Grammy Awards	Best Dance/Electronic Recording	"Melatonin"	Pending	
2027	Grammy Awards	Best Dance Pop Recording	"Too Easy"	Pending	

== Tours ==
=== Headlining ===
- Aquarius World Tour (2014–2015)
- Joyride Tour (2016)
- 333 Tour (2021–2022)
- BB/Ang3l Tour (2024)
- Match My Freak: World Tour (2024–2025)
- Three Nights With A Popstar (2026)
- The Show Must Go On (2027)

=== Supporting ===
- Nicki Minaj – The Pinkprint Tour (2015)
- Katy Perry – Prismatic World Tour (2015)
- Maroon 5 – Maroon V Tour (2017)
- Flume – Palaces World Tour (2022)
- Harry Styles - Together, Together (2027)
