= Talk to Me Nice =

Single by Tinashe

from the album BB/Ang3l
- Released: July 21, 2023
- Genre: R&B
- Length: 3:50
- Label: Tinashe Music; Nice Life Recording Company
- Songwriters: Tinashe Kachingwe; Jason W. Chung; Elijah Blue Molina; James Wrighter
- Producers: Nosaj Thing; Scoop DeVille

Tinashe singles chronology
"Who's Taking You Home?" (2023)	"Talk to Me Nice" (2023)	"Needs" (2023)

Music video
- "Talk to Me Nice" on YouTube

"Talk to Me Nice" is a song by American singer Tinashe. It was released on July 21, 2023, by her independent label Tinashe Music Inc. and Nice Life Recording Company. It serves as the lead single to her sixth studio album BB/Ang3l. It was produced by American producers Nosaj Thing and Scoop DeVille. It was written by James Wrighter along with the two producers and Tinashe.

== Background and release ==
Earlier in the year, Tinashe appeared on the deluxe edition of Shygirl's Nymph on the track "Heaven". She was also brought out during Kaytranada's Coachella set, alongside Anderson .Paak, H.E.R., and others. While on her summer 2023 tour that June, Tinashe revealed in an interview with Rolling Stone Korea that she had new music set to be released the next month. According to her, her next project would blend genres. She told Rolling Stone Korea, "With this new music, I did a lot of genre-combining, and he really brought an electronic side that I loved in the production. Then I balanced that with a lot of R&B melodies and vocals. I hope everyone really likes it."

== Critical reception ==
Sam Damshenas from Gay Times called the song as "swaggy R&B" track. Rafael Helfand of The Fader regarded the song as "a sultry R&B track with a beat that centers trap drums and a woozy, future-funk synth [...] she allows her voice to flutter and croon, flexing the versatility of her vocal chords". Vincent Anthony of The 97 stated "In a musical landscape littered with relentless singles that are barely two minutes long, it's the artists who take their time that serve up the best time. [...] The fact that the song clocks in at nearly 4 minutes sets it apart, but also the sensual, slickly produced mid-tempo love song is not just a mood, it's many. Tom Breihan of Stereogum described the song as "a sparse, breathy track about infatuation, and it's exactly the kind of thing I want to hear from Tinashe". According to Lavender Alexandria of HotNewHipHop, "The song is sonically reserved but Tinashe is exceedingly confident on it. Her demands come in refrains so slick and catchy it can take a while to realize just how cutthroat they are." Sam Franzini of The Line of Best Fit wrote that the single is "new ground for Tinashe, a mesmerizing track interspersed with vocal chops and a driving bassline. She's self-sufficient, grounded in her own person..." Parker Beatty from Mxdwn described the track as featuring "soft synth and skittering drums that give it a nocturnal atmosphere," adding that Tinashe's "low-key yet compelling performance glides effortlessly across the slick production".

i-D ranked "Talk to Me Nice" at number 27 on its list of the 100 best songs of 2023.

== Music video ==
The accompanied music video was directed by Bradley Calder and was released on July 21. The video depicts Tinashe placed in a beige curtain background. In the video she is seen ripping off what appears as a layer of her skin. Tinashe explained to a fan that the video's concept represents her "shedding old layers, beginning anew, peeling back layers, intimacy, exploring distortions, perceptions, removing the masks, raw, skin, new era, fresh". Stereogum writer Tom Breihan stated "Tinashe lip-syncs while slowly peeling off a facemask, and she makes that act look absolutely hypnotic. People might discover some new kinks with this one." The concept was teased just hours before it was released in a clip where she rips a layer skin off of her hand.

== Release history ==
Release history and formats for "Talk to Me Nice"
Region	Date	Format	Label	Ref.
Various	July 21, 2023	Digital download; streaming	Tinashe Music; Nice Life Recording Company	
