= BB/Ang3l =

Studio album by Tinashe
- Released: September 8, 2023
- Studio: Tinashe's home studio (Los Angeles)
- Genre: Electro-R&B
- Length: 20:42
- Labels: Tinashe Music; Nice Life
- Producers: JonnyMade; Kurzweil; Machinedrum; Nosaj Thing; Platinum Libraries; Royce David; Scoop DeVille; Vladislav Delay

Tinashe chronology
333 (2021)	BB/Ang3l (2023)	Quantum Baby (2024)

Singles from BB/Ang3l
- 1. "Talk to Me Nice" Released: July 21, 2023; 2. "Needs" Released: August 18, 2023

BB/Ang3l (pronounced as "Baby Angel") is the sixth studio album by American singer Tinashe. It was released on September 8, 2023, by her independent label, Tinashe Music, and Nice Life Recording Company. Conceived as a concise, seven-track electronic R&B project, the album was described by Tinashe as highly personal, emphasizing raw emotion and a streamlined approach. It includes two singles "Talk to Me Nice" and "Needs", accompanied by a visual project titled The BB/Ang3l Experience.

Following the album's release, Tinashe launched the BB/Ang3l Tour after the cancellation of her previously announced co-headlining tour with Shygirl. BB/Ang3l failed to chart on the Billboard 200, but reached number 32 on the US Top Album Sales chart. A sequel album titled Quantum Baby was released in 2024.

== Background ==
After featuring on Shygirl's song "Heaven", Tinashe shared the album's tracklist on August 31, 2023. In an interview with Nylon, Tinashe described the album contains "a very personal approach", noting that it strips away excess and focuses on "raw emotion". On Good Morning America, Tinashe told host Michael Strahan that the album "represents who I am right now and everything I've been going through", calling her music "a melting pot of all things". Tinashe explained that she intentionally kept BB/Ang3l to seven tracks, stating that "sometimes it's good to streamline [an album] and cut the fat", and that she wanted listeners "to appreciate every single one of those seven songs". She added that artists "spend so much time working on albums", noting that it can feel "crazy to just give it all away in one foul swoop", as she hoped fans would "sit with it and really let it sink in". Regarding the possibility of additional releases connected to the project, she responded only, "Maybe... we'll see."

On April 8, 2024, the second part of the album was officially announced as Quantum Baby, and it was released on August 16, 2024.

== Composition ==
I was really inspired by screen names and avatars, and how we're able to create our own personas online. We're able to name ourselves in that way and take control of our identity. I wanted to create something similar to a screen name, or some type of tag that I could put on this era that would represent the persona or the energy that I was embodying for this particular project.

— Tinashe discussing BB/Ang3l's title in Dazed magazine interview

BB/Ang3l is an electronic-R&B album which features seven tracks, with Tinashe performing all vocals herself. About the album's title, she stated that she was inspired by "screen names and avatars", and how this enabled her to create her own persona online and took control over it. According to Uproxx writer Aaron Williams, the 7-song tracklist highlights her individual contributions throughout the project.

"Talk to Me Nice"
A 13-second sample from "Talk to Me Nice". It features its trap-based beat, woozy synths, and a portion of Tinashe's monotone hook alongside her more fluid vocal phrasing.

The album opens with "Treason", a synth-driven track that builds in "jangly arrangement". Tinashe admits "hate myself for treason", as she revisits a past relationship. "Talk to Me Nice" is a "swaggy R&B" song, described as "atmospheric" and built on vocal chops and a driving bassline. It presents her as self-assured yet still open to intimacy. "Needs" is a wavy song that offers a flirty, contemporary R&B and trap fusion, incorporating food-related references inspired by a Samantha storyline in Sex and the City. "Uh Huh", a slower track built around its onomatopoeic chorus, comments on a relationship that becomes deeper than she initially expected. It is also a "slow-burning, velvet-sheeted sex jam that sounds airlifted from a mid-aughts Mariah Carey album", a mood that carries through even the album's more "livelier cuts". On "Gravity", Tinashe adopts an "enigmatic vocal performance" to convey indecision, such as the line "I've been drowning in my dreams again", before ending with a "hypnotic" close. "Tightrope" pairs her "whispered, airy vocals" with a frenetic breakbeat, recalling nights driving around Los Angeles before the relationship "turned sour".

== Promotion ==
On February 23, 2024, Tinashe released a twenty-minute visual project, titled The BB/Ang3l Experience. She served as creative director, with Mike Ho directing and choreographer Shay Latukolan coordinating the movements and performances. The video opens with the definition of "stamina" and features choreography across several tracks, including "Treason" and "Talk to Me Nice".

=== Singles ===
"Talk to Me Nice" was released as the album's lead single on July 21, 2023. Its music video, directed by Bradley J. Calder, premiered on the same day on Tinashe's YouTube account. The music video shows Tinashe with honey-blonde hair peeling a layer of dead skin from her face before water begins to pour over her. The second single, "Needs", was released on August 18, 2023, along with the music video, directed by Sammy Rawal. In the video, Tinashe is shown dancing through the aisles of a grocery store, accompanied by her friends.

=== Other songs ===
The music video for the fourth track, "Uh Huh", was released on September 8, 2023, alongside the album's release.

=== Tour ===
Tinashe announced the Tinashe & Shygirl Tour, co-headlining together with Shygirl, on August 1, 2023, with Uniiqu3 as the supporting act. However, due to a medical condition, Shygirl had to pull out of the shows on October 20, 2023, allowing her to get surgery for "an ongoing respiratory condition". In response to the cancellation of the tour, Tinashe stated that "the show must go on!", and announced that she and her team were putting together her own tour, leading to the announcement of the BB/Ang3l Tour on November 14, 2023.

== Critical reception ==
Professional ratings
Review scores
Source	Rating
Euphoria Magazine	3.5/5 stars
The Line of Best Fit	8/10
Pitchfork	7.6/10

Dylan Green of Pitchfork described BB/Ang3l as "as stylish and focused as a runway walk", writing that its "sense of intimacy, combined with her thriving confidence [...] makes BB/Ang3l so potent". Sam Franzini of The Line of Best Fit argued that the album "might be her strongest work", noting that Tinashe is exploring contemporary R&B and trap styles without introducing new ideas, stating: "there's still a spark that makes them hard-to-miss". HotNewHipHop praised BB/Ang3l as a project that may appeal to Tinashe's audience as well as R&B listeners.

=== Year-end lists ===
BB/Ang3l appeared on several year-end lists that recognized both the album and its singles. The Forty-Five placed the project at number 32 on its list of The Best Albums of 2023. Four tracks from the album also gained individual acclaim. The Fader ranked "Needs" at number 10 on its list of The 100 Best Songs of 2023, while i-D placed "Talk to Me Nice" at number 27 on its corresponding year-end roundup. Additionally, Paper listed "Treason" at number 4 in its Favorite Songs of 2023. Pitchfork featured "Needs" on two separate lists, placing it at number 46 on The 100 Best Songs of 2023 and number 4 on The Best Pop Music of 2023. Beats Per Minute ranked "None of My Business" as its 35th top song of 2023, stating that the song is "another display of a pop artisan at her most deft, self-aware, and icy".

== Track listing ==
BB/Ang3l track listing
No.	Title	Writer(s)	Producer(s)	Length
1.	"Treason"	Tinashe Kachingwe; Prince-Phabian Iman-Alexander Graham; Travis Stewart	Machinedrum	2:46
2.	"Talk to Me Nice"	Kachingwe; Christopher James Terrel-Fumbanks; Jason W. Chung; Elijah Blue Modina	Nosaj Thing; Scoop DeVille	3:49
3.	"Needs"	Kachingwe; Royce Pearson; Jonathan Ferrel	Royce David; JonnyMade	2:26
4.	"Uh Huh"	Kachingwe; Oladotun Oyebadejo Jr.	Kurzweil	3:02
5.	"Gravity"	Kachingwe; Stewart; Sasu Ripatti	Machinedrum; Vladislav Delay	3:02
6.	"None of My Business"	Kachingwe; Pearson; John Walsh Homen; Oscar Michel Leo-Christensen	David; Platinum Libraries	2:31
7.	"Tightrope"	Kachingwe; Stewart	Machinedrum	3:06
Total length:				20:42

== Personnel ==
Credits were adapted from Tidal.

=== Recording locations ===
- Tinashe Music (all tracks)

=== Musicians ===
- Tinashe Kachingwe – vocalist (all tracks), author (all tracks)
- Prince-Phabian Iman-Alexander Graham – author (1)
- Travis Stewart – author (1, 5, 7)
- Christopher James Terrel-Fumbanks – author (2)
- Elijah Blue Molina – author (2)
- Jason W. Chung – author (2)
- Jonathan Ferrel – author (3)
- Royce Pearson – author (3, 6)
- Oladotun Oyebadejo Jr. – author (4)
- Sasu Ripatti – author (5)
- John Walsh Homen – author (6)
- Oscar Michel Leo-Christensen – author (6)

=== Production ===
- Machinedrum – producer (1, 5, 7)
- Nosaj Thing – producer (2)
- Scoop DeVille – producer (2)
- JonnyMade – producer (3)
- Royce David – producer (3, 6)
- Kurzweil – producer (4)
- Vladislav Delay – producer (5)
- Platinum Libraries – producer (6)
- Ike Schultz – engineer (all tracks), mixer (all tracks), vocal production (1, 2, 4–7), additional vocal production (3), vocal engineer (3)
- Chris Gehringer – master engineer (all tracks)
- Ricky Reed – vocal production (3)

== Charts ==
Chart performance
Chart (2024)	Peak position
US Top Album Sales (Billboard)	32

== Release history ==
Release history
Region	Date	Format	Label	Ref.
Various	September 8, 2023	CD; digital download; LP; streaming	Tinashe Music; Nice Life	
