= Needs (song) =

Single by Tinashe

from the album BB/Ang3l
- Released: August 18, 2023
- Length: 2:27
- Label: Tinashe Music; Nice Life Recording Company
- Songwriters: Tinashe Kachingwe; Royce David Pearson; Jonathan Ferrel
- Producers: Royce David; Jonny Made-It

Tinashe singles chronology
"Talk to Me Nice" (2023)	"Needs" (2023)	"Nasty" (2024)

Music video
- "Needs" on YouTube

"Needs" is a song by American singer Tinashe and the second single from her sixth studio album, BB/Ang3l (2023). It was released on August 18, 2023, through her independent label Tinashe Music Inc. and Nice Life Recording Company, and was produced by Royce David and Jonny Made-It, who additionally co-wrote the song with Tinashe herself.

== Background ==
The cover art is from the same photoshoot as Tinashe's previous single "Talk to Me Nice" and her album, BB/Ang3l. She initially teased the song on her TikTok page on August 6, 2023. In an interview with Dazed, Tinashe explained her inspiration behind the song. She stated "I just wanted to write something really flirty and sexy and cute. It was kind of a freestyle. I just pressed record and played a beat, and whatever came out of me was what I went with. That 'we all got needs' tagline at the end was my initial freestyle. Sometimes I really think that your first instinct is your best instinct, and you should go with your gut. You should follow that initial spark of inspiration when it comes to making art. That's really what this song was".

== Critical reception ==
Tom Breihan of Stereogum regarded the song as "a slinky, sexy track with breathy vocals and a loping, club-ready beat. Tinashe switches back and forth between a purr and a whisper". For HotNewHipHop, Alexis Oatman stated that "Tinashe seems more confident than ever on the track and has no problem showing it."

Pitchfork ranked "Needs" at number 46 out of the 100 best songs of 2023, stating "Tinashe doesn't play coy about what she wants from a man on 'Needs', the no-frills, sex-positive standout from this year's BB/Ang3l EP. Especially when coupled with a dynamic video full of freewheeling grocery-store choreography, the alt-R&B artist's confidence in collecting simps is infectious". The Fader ranked "Needs" as its 10th best song of 2023, arguing that "“Needs” is an unabashedly horny pop-R&B anthem, a high-glam update to DJ Mustard-type strip club bangers that’s empowering and flirty in equal measure."

== Music video ==
The music video premiered the same day as the song was released via Tinashe's YouTube channel. It was directed by Sammy Rawal. The video takes place in an empty grocery store, where Tinashe is accompanied by her six dancers, running all around the store. She made several innuendos regarding the food contents. She is covered in deli meat when she sings the line "My body is a buffet".

The video has surpassed 8 million views as of October 2026. Jaeden Pinder of Pitchfork put Tinashe's performance in the "Needs" video in sixth place in their year-end list of the Best Music Video Choreography of 2023.

== Credits and personnel ==
Credits adapted from Genius.

- Tinashe – vocals, songwriting
- Royce David – production, songwriting
- Jonny Made-It – production, songwriting
- Ricky Reed – vocal production
- Ike Schultz – mix engineering
- Chris Gehringer – master engineering

== Release history ==
Release history and formats for "Needs"
Region	Date	Format	Label	Ref.
Various	August 18, 2023	Digital download; streaming	Tinashe Music; Nice Life Recording Company	
