= Tinashe discography =

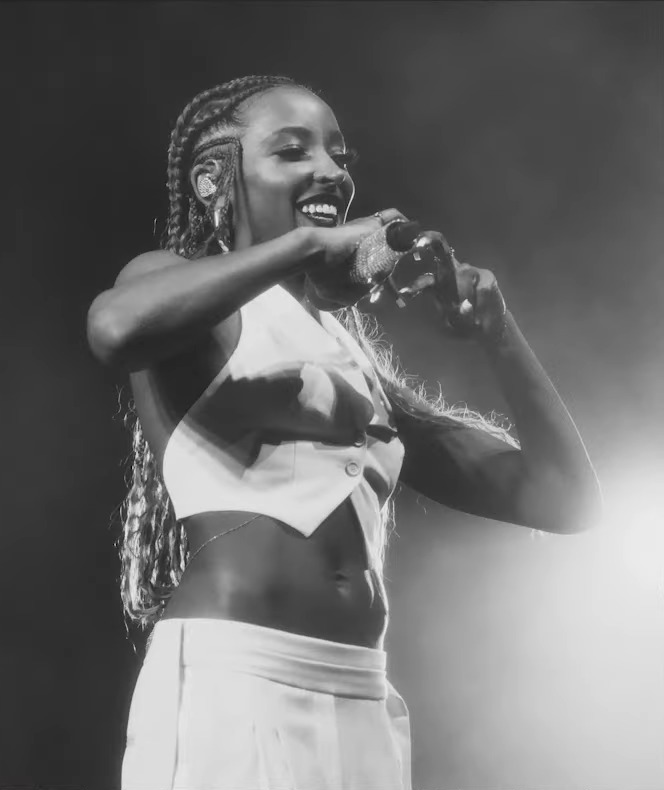
- Tinashe performing at Coachella in 2024
- Studio albums: 8
- Singles: 59
- Music videos: 30
- Mixtapes: 4

American singer Tinashe has released eight studio albums, four mixtapes, one extended play and fifty-nine singles, including twenty-seven as a featured artist. According to Recording Industry Association of America, Tinashe has sold 7 million digital singles in the United States. Tinashe's debut album, Aquarius, was released in 2014. The lead single from the album was "2 On" and featured rapper Schoolboy Q. "2 On" peaked at 24 on the Billboard Hot 100, topped the US rhythmic chart and was certified platinum in the US by the RIAA and in Australia by the ARIA. In September 2015, Tinashe announced the tentative title of her second album, Joyride. Following delays in the album's release, Tinashe released the digital album Nightride in 2016. On January 18, 2018, Tinashe released the lead single from 2018 album Joyride, titled "No Drama" (featuring Offset). Two more singles, "Faded Love" (featuring Future) and "Me So Bad" (featuring Ty Dolla Sign and French Montana) preceded the album.

In 2019, Tinashe departed from her label RCA Records and released her fourth album, Songs for You, independently. Tinashe's fifth studio album, 333, was released in 2021 and was preceded by the singles "Pasadena" (featuring Buddy) and "Bouncin". In 2023, she released her sixth album, BB/Ang3l. In 2024, the song "Nasty" became Tinashe's first solo song to enter the Billboard Hot 100, following its viral use on social media. It served as the lead single for her seventh album, Quantum Baby. In June 2026, Tinashe released "Too Easy" as the first single from her eighth album, Popstar. It was announced in July 2026 alongside second single, "Crash Out", with third single "Melatonin" being released in August 2026 and fourth single, "Pillow Fight" being released in September 2026 alongside album track "I'd Rather Be Alone". The album was released on September 25, 2026.

== Studio albums ==
List of studio albums, with selected details and chart positions
Title	Details	Peak chart positions										Certifications
Title	Details	US	US R&B /HH	US R&B	AUS	AUS Urb.	CAN	FRA	NZ	UK	UK R&B	Certifications
Aquarius	Released: October 3, 2014; Label: RCA; Formats: CD, digital download, streaming	17	3	2	57	5	—	167	—	78	7	RMNZ: Gold
Nightride	Released: November 4, 2016; Label: RCA; Formats: Digital download, streaming	89	8	4	— (Note: Nightride did not enter the Australian Top 50 Albums Chart, but peaked at number 44 on the Digital Albums chart.)	12	—	—	— (Note: Nightride did not enter the NZ Top 40 Albums Chart, but peaked at number 3 on the NZ Heatseekers Albums Chart.)	— (Note: Nightride did not enter the UK Top 100 Albums Chart, but peaked at number 78 on the UK Albums Downloads chart.)	16	
Joyride	Released: April 13, 2018; Label: RCA; Formats: CD, LP, digital download, streaming	58	29	8	76	21	55	161	— (Note: Joyride did not enter the NZ Top 40 Albums Chart, but peaked at number 3 on the NZ Heatseekers Albums Chart.)	78	6	
Songs for You	Released: November 21, 2019; Label: Tinashe Music, Equity Distribution; Formats: CD, LP, digital download, streaming	147	—	20	—	—	—	—	—	—	—	
333	Released: August 6, 2021; Label: Tinashe Music, Equity Distribution; Formats: CD, LP, digital download, streaming	175	—	20	—	—	—	—	—	— (Note: 333 did not enter the UK Albums Chart Top 100, but peaked at number 56 on the Official UK Album Downloads Chart Top 100 on August 13, 2021.)	—	
BB/Ang3l	Released: September 8, 2023; Label: Tinashe Music, Nice Life; Formats: CD, LP, digital download, streaming	— (Note: BB/Ang3l did not enter the Billboard 200, but peaked at number 32 on the Top Album Sales chart on February 17, 2024.)	—	—	—	—	—	—	—	—	—	
Quantum Baby	Released: August 16, 2024; Label: Tinashe Music, Nice Life; Formats: CD, LP, digital download, streaming	199	—	23	—	—	—	—	—	— (Note: Quantum Baby did not enter the UK Albums Chart Top 100, but peaked at number 92 on the UK Album Downloads Chart on August 23, 2024.)	—	RMNZ: Gold
Popstar	Released: September 25, 2026; Label: Atlantic, Tinashe Music, Nice Life; Formats: CD, LP, digital download, streaming	6	—	—	10	—	45	— (Note: Popstar did not enter the French Albums Chart, but peaked at number 88 on the French Physical Albums Chart.)	22	35	1	
"—" denotes items which were not released in that country or failed to chart.

== Extended plays ==
List of extended plays, with selected details
Title	Details
Comfort & Joy	Released: November 25, 2020; Label: Tinashe Music LLC; Formats: Digital download, streaming

== Mixtapes ==
List of mixtapes, with selected details
Title	Details
In Case We Die	Released: February 1, 2012; Label: Self-released; Format: Digital download
Reverie	Released: September 6, 2012; Label: Self-released; Formats: Digital download
Black Water	Released: November 26, 2013; Label: Self-released; Formats: Digital download
Amethyst	Released: March 16, 2015; Label: Self-released; Formats: Digital download

== Singles ==
=== As lead artist ===
List of singles as lead artist, with selected chart positions and certifications, showing year released and album name
Title	Year	Peak chart positions										Certifications	Album
Title	Year	US	US R&B /HH	US R&B	US Rhy.	AUS	BEL	CAN	NZ Hot	UK	UK R&B	Certifications	Album
"2 On" (featuring Schoolboy Q)	2014	24	5	3	1	29	88	74	—	127	14	RIAA: 4× Platinum; ARIA: Platinum; BPI: Platinum; MC: Gold; RMNZ: 3× Platinum	Aquarius
"Pretend" (featuring A$AP Rocky)	2014	— (Note: "Pretend" did not enter the Billboard Hot 100, but peaked at number 17 on the Bubbling Under Hot 100 Singles chart.)	34	12	29	— (Note: "Pretend" did not enter the Australian Top 100 chart, but peaked at number 12 on the Australian Hitseekers Singles chart.)	—	—	—	—	36		Aquarius
"All Hands on Deck" (solo or featuring Iggy Azalea)	2015	— (Note: "All Hands on Deck" did not enter the Billboard Hot 100, but peaked at number one on the Bubbling Under Hot 100 Singles chart.)	33	11	11	45	58	—	—	156	34	ARIA: Gold; RMNZ: Gold	Aquarius
"Player" (solo or featuring Chris Brown)	2015	— (Note: "Player" did not enter the Billboard Hot 100, but peaked at number three on the Bubbling Under Hot 100 Singles chart.)	39	9	10	90	115	—	—	85	14	ARIA: Gold	Joyride (Note: "Player", "Superlove", and "Flame" only appear on the Japanese edition of Joyride.)
"Superlove"	2016	—	— (Note: "Superlove" did not enter the Billboard Hot R&B/Hip-Hop Songs chart, but peaked at number 21 on the R&B/Hip-Hop Digital Song Sales chart.)	19	26	—	138	—	—	—	—		Joyride
"Company"	2016	—	— (Note: "Company" did not enter the Billboard Hot R&B/Hip-Hop Songs chart, but peaked at number 45 on the R&B/Hip-Hop Digital Song Sales chart.)	— (Note: "Company" did not enter the Billboard Hot R&B Songs chart, but peaked at number 21 on the R&B Digital Song Sales chart.)	—	—	—	—	—	—	—		Nightride
"Flame"	2017	—	—	—	—	— (Note: "Flame" did not enter the Australian Top 100 chart, but peaked at number 14 on the Australian Urban Singles chart.)	—	—	9	—	—		Joyride
"No Drama" (featuring Offset)	2018	— (Note: "No Drama" did not enter the Billboard Hot 100, but peaked at number 23 on the Bubbling Under Hot 100 Singles chart.)	— (Note: "No Drama" did not enter the Billboard Hot R&B/Hip-Hop Songs chart, but peaked at number two on the Bubbling Under R&B/Hip-Hop Singles chart.)	9	24	— (Note: "No Drama" did not enter the Australian Top 100 chart, but peaked at number 39 on the Australian Urban Singles chart.)	93	—	8	—	—		Joyride
"Faded Love" (featuring Future)	2018	—	—	22	—	—	—	—	10	—	—		Joyride
"Me So Bad" (featuring French Montana and Ty Dolla $ign)	2018	—	— (Note: "Me So Bad" did not enter the Billboard Hot R&B/Hip-Hop Songs chart, but peaked at number 19 on the R&B/Hip-Hop Digital Song Sales chart.)	21	—	— (Note: "Me So Bad" did not enter the Australian Top 100 chart, but peaked at number 37 on the Australian Urban Singles chart.)	—	—	7	—	—		Joyride
"Like I Used To"	2018	—	—	– (Note: "Like I Used To" did not enter the Hot R&B Songs chart but peaked at number seven on the R&B Digital Song Sales chart.)	—	— (Note: "Like I Used To" did not enter the Australian Top 100 chart, but peaked at number 40 on the Australian Digital Singles chart.)	—	—	27	—	—	RMNZ: Gold	Non-album singles
"Throw a Fit"	2018	—	– (Note: "Throw a Fit" did not enter the Hot R&B/Hip-Hop Songs chart but peaked at number 25 on the R&B/Hip-Hop Digital Song Sales chart.)	– (Note: "Throw a Fit" did not enter the Hot R&B Songs chart but peaked at number six on the R&B Digital Song Sales chart.)	—	—	—	—	—	—	—		Non-album singles
"Die a Little Bit" (featuring Ms Banks)	2019	—	—	—	—	—	—	—	—	—	—		Songs for You
"Touch & Go" (with 6lack)	2019	—	—	—	—	—	—	—	—	—	—		Songs for You
"Save Room for Us" (featuring MAKJ)	2020	—	—	— (Note: "Save Room for Us" did not enter the Billboard Hot R&B Songs chart, but peaked at number 9 on the R&B Digital Song Sales chart.)	—	—	—	—	—	—	—		Songs for You
"Rascal (Superstar)"	2020	—	—	— (Note: "Rascal (Superstar)" did not enter the Billboard Hot R&B Songs chart, but peaked at number 10 on the R&B Digital Song Sales chart.)	—	—	—	—	—	—	—		Non-album singles
"Dance Like Nobody's Watching" (with Iggy Azalea)	2020	— (Note: "Dance Like Nobody's Watching" did not enter the Billboard Hot 100, but peaked at number 33 on the Digital Song Sales chart.)	— (Note: "Dance Like Nobody's Watching" did not enter the Billboard R&B/Hip-Hop Singles, but peaked at number 9 on the Rap Digital Songs chart.)	—	—	—	—	—	—	—	—		Non-album singles
"Love Line" (with Shift K3Y)	2021	—	—	—	—	—	—	—	—	—	—		Non-album singles
"Pasadena" (with Buddy)	2021	—	—	—	—	—	—	—	—	—	—		333
"Bouncin'"	2021	—	—	—	—	—	—	—	—	—	—		333
"X" (featuring Jeremih)	2022	—	—	—	—	—	—	—	—	—	—		333
"Naturally"	2022	—	—	—	—	—	—	—	—	—	—		333
"New to You" (with Calvin Harris, Normani and Offset)	2022	—	—	—	—	—	—	—	15	—	—		Funk Wav Bounces Vol. 2
"Talk to Me Nice"	2023	—	—	—	—	—	—	—	—	—	—		BB/Ang3l
"Needs"	2023	—	—	—	—	—	—	—	—	—	—		BB/Ang3l
"Nasty"	2024	61	15	4	1	83	—	61	10	66	25	RIAA: Platinum; RMNZ: Gold	Quantum Baby
"Getting No Sleep"	2024	—	—	—	—	—	—	—	—	—	—		Quantum Baby
"No Broke Boys" (solo or remix with Disco Lines)	2024	36	—	25	13	3	7	7	4	2	—	ARIA: 6× Platinum; BPI: 2× Platinum; RMNZ: 3× Platinum	Quantum Baby
"Too Easy"	2026	— (Note: "Too Easy" did not enter the Billboard Hot 100, but peaked at number 15 on the Hot Dance/Pop Songs chart.)	—	—	—	—	—	—	40	—	—		Popstar
"Crash Out"	2026	—	—	21	—	—	—	—	28	—	—		Popstar
"Melatonin"	2026	— (Note: "Melatonin" did not enter the Billboard Hot 100, but peaked at number 9 on the Hot Dance/Pop Songs chart.)	—	—	—	—	—	—	20	—	—		Popstar
"Pillow Fight"	2026	—	—	—	—	—	—	—	23	—	—		Popstar
"—" denotes a recording that did not chart or was not released in that territory.

=== As featured artist ===
List of singles as a featured artist, with selected details, chart positions and certifications
Title	Year	Peak chart positions											Certifications	Album
Title	Year	US	US R&B /HH	US Dance	UK	UK R&B	CAN	SCO	BEL	FRA	NZ Hot	AUS	Certifications	Album
"Artificial People" (OFM featuring Tinashe)	2011	—	—	—	—	—	—	—	—	—	—	—		Non-album singles
"Cake" (Bobby Brackins featuring Tinashe)	2011	—	—	—	—	—	—	—	—	—	—	—		Non-album singles
"Body Language" (Kid Ink featuring Usher and Tinashe)	2014	72	21	—	46	5	—	45	— (Note: "Body Language" did not enter the Ultratop 50, but peaked at number 28 on the Ultratip 50 Singles chart.)	104	—	77	RIAA: Platinum; ARIA: Gold; BPI: Silver; MC: Gold; RMNZ: Platinum	Full Speed
"Jealous" (Remix) (Nick Jonas featuring Tinashe)	2014	—	—	—	—	—	—	—	—	—	—	—		Nick Jonas X2
"Drop That Kitty" (Ty Dolla Sign featuring Charli XCX and Tinashe)	2015	—	— (Note: "Drop That Kitty" did not enter the Billboard R&B/Hip-Hop Singles, but peaked at number four on the Bubbling Under R&B/Hip-Hop Singles chart.)	—	—	—	—	—	— (Note: "Drop that Kitty" did not enter the Ultratop 50, but peaked at number 18 on the Ultratip 50 Singles chart.)	187	—	— (Note: "Drop That Kitty" did not enter the Australian Top 100 chart, but peaked at number 28 on the Australian Urban Singles chart.)		Non-album single
"I Wanna Get Better" (Bleachers featuring Tinashe)	2015	—	—	—	—	—	—	—	—	—	—	—		Terrible Thrills, Vol. 2
"All My Friends" (Snakehips featuring Tinashe and Chance the Rapper)	2015	— (Note: "All My Friends" did not enter the Billboard Hot 100, but peaked at number three on the Bubbling Under Hot 100 Singles chart.)	34	2	5	—	82	7	25	—	—	3	RIAA: Platinum; ARIA: 3× Platinum; BPI: 2× Platinum; MC: Platinum; RMNZ: 6× Platinum; IFPI DEN: Platinum; BVMI: Gold; NVPI: Platinum	All My Friends
"Just Say" (KDA featuring Tinashe)	2016	—	—	15	88	—	—	46	— (Note: "Just Say" did not enter the Ultratop 50, but peaked at number 37 on the Ultratip 50 Singles chart.)	—	—	— (Note: "Just Say" did not enter the Australian Top 100 chart, but peaked at number 41 on the Australian Dance Singles chart.)	BPI: Silver	Non-album singles
"Duele el Corazón" (Enrique Iglesias featuring Wisin or Tinashe and Javada)	2016	82	—	—	—	—	—	—	—	—	—	—		Non-album singles
"All Caught Up" (GTA featuring Tinashe)	2016	—	—	—	—	—	—	—	—	—	—	—		Good Times Ahead
"Freal Luv" (Far East Movement and Marshmello featuring Chanyeol and Tinashe)	2016	—	—	20	—	—	—	—	— (Note: "Freal Luv" did not enter the Ultratop 50, but peaked at number 87 on the Ultratip Singles chart.)	—	—	—		Identity
"Slumber Party" (Britney Spears featuring Tinashe)	2016	86	—	1	— (Note: Slumber Party did not enter the UK Top 100, but peaked at number 73 on the Official UK Single Sales Chart.)	—	51	90	— (Note: "Slumber Party" did not enter the Ultratop 50, but peaked at number 60 on the Ultratip Singles chart.)	121	—	—		Glory
"Text from Your Ex" (Tinie Tempah featuring Tinashe)	2017	—	—	—	23	—	—	27	— (Note: "Text From Your Ex" did not enter the Ultratop 50, but peaked at number 42 on the Ultratop Urban Singles chart.)	—	—	—	BPI: Silver	Youth
"Up in This" (Blackbear and Tinashe)	2017	—	— (Note: "Up in This" did not enter the Billboard Hot R&B/Hip-Hop Songs chart, but peaked at number 20 on the R&B/Hip-Hop Digital Song Sales chart.)	— (Note: "Up in This" did not enter the Hot R&B Songs chart but peaked at number five on the R&B Digital Song Sales chart.)	—	—	—	—	—	—	—	—		Cybersex
"Quit You" (Lost Kings featuring Tinashe)	2017	—	—	32	—	—	—	—	—	—	—	—		We Are Lost Kings (Japan EP)
"Might Die Young" (Bobby Brackins featuring Olivia O'Brien and Tinashe)	2018	—	—	—	—	—	—	—	—	—	—	—		To Kill For
"Only" (Zhu with Tinashe)	2020	—	—	25	—	—	—	—	—	—	—	—		Dreamland 2021
"Play Fight" (They featuring Tinashe)	2020	—	—	—	—	—	—	—	—	—	22	—		The Amanda Tape
"Glitch" (Buddy featuring Tinashe)	2020	—	—	—	—	—	—	—	—	—	—	—		Non-album single
"The Worst in Me" (Kaytranada featuring Tinashe)	2020	—	—	17	—	—	—	—	— (Note: "The Worst in Me" did not enter the Ultratop 50, but peaked at number 78 on the Ultratip 50 Singles chart.)	—	—	—	RIAA: Gold	Bubba
"Lean on Me" (Cheat Codes featuring Tinashe)	2021	—	—	12	—	—	—	—	—	—	30	—		Hellraisers, Pt. 1
"Esther" (Baynk featuring Tinashe)	2021	—	—	—	—	—	—	—	—	—	32	—		Adolescence
"Who's Gonna Love You Tonight" (Snakehips featuring Tinashe)	2022	—	—	—	—	—	—	—	—	—	—	—		Never Worry
"Scandalous" (Gryffin featuring Tinashe)	2022	—	—	24	—	—	—	—	—	—	—	—		Alive
"Heaven" (Shygirl featuring Tinashe)	2023	—	—	—	—	—	—	—	—	—	—	—		Nymph_o
"Who's Taking You Home?" (Kyle featuring Tinashe)	2023	—	—	—	—	—	—	—	—	—	—	—		Smyle Again
"Zoom" (Machinedrum featuring Tinashe)	2024	—	—	—	—	—	—	—	—	—	—	—		3FOR82
"—" denotes a recording that did not chart or was not released in that territory.

=== Promotional singles ===
List of promotional singles, with selected details and chart positions
Title	Year	Peak chart positions				Album
Title	Year	US Bub.	US R&B/HH	US R&B	CAN	Album
"Vulnerable" (featuring Travis Scott)	2013	—	—	—	—	Black Water (Note: "Vulnerable" also appears on the Japanese edition of Aquarius.)
"Feels Like Vegas"	2014	—	—	—	—	Aquarius
"Bet" (featuring Devonté Hynes)	2014	—	—	– (Note: "Bet" did not enter the Hot R&B Songs chart but peaked at number 22 on the R&B Digital Song Sales chart.)	—	Aquarius
"Watch Me Work"	2014	5	34	14	68	Aquarius
"Party Favors" (solo or featuring Young Thug) (Note: Only the solo version appears on Nightride.)	2015	—	—	—	—	Nightride
"Ride of Your Life"	2016	—	—	– (Note: "Ride of Your Life" did not enter the Hot R&B Songs chart but peaked at number 20 on the R&B Digital Song Sales chart.)	—	Nightride
"Light the Night Up"	2017	—	—	—	—	Thursday Night Football Telecast
"Out Tonight"	2019	—	—	—	—	Rent: Live
"Hopscotch" (original or remix with THEY.)	2020	—	—	—	—	Songs for You
"I'm Every Woman" (featuring Tokimonsta)	2021	—	—	—	—	Black History Always: Music for the Movement – Vol. 2
"I Can See the Future"	2021	—	—	—	—	333
"Gravity" (Live from Spotify Green Screen)	2023	—	—	—	—	BB/Ang3l
"I'd Rather Be Alone"	2026	—	—	—	—	Popstar
"—" denotes a recording that did not chart or was not released in that territory.

== Other charted songs ==
List of non-single charting songs, with selected details and chart positions
Title	Year	Peak chart positions		Album
Title	Year	US Dance	NZ Hot	Album
"Dollar Signs" (Calvin Harris featuring Tinashe)	2014	31	—	Motion
"B2b" (Charli XCX featuring Tinashe)	2024	14	—	Brat and It's Completely Different but Also Still Brat
"Sunglasses"	2026	—	35	Popstar
"Nobody Wanna Dance Anymore"	2026	—	15	Popstar

== Guest appearances ==
List of non-single guest appearances with other performing artists, showing year released and album name
Title	Year	Other artist(s)	Album	Ref.
"Closure"	2012	New Boyz	Foolie Tape	
"Painted Faces"	2013	Jacques Greene	Songs from Scratch	
"One for Me"	2013	Ryan Hemsworth	Guilt Trips	
"Innocence Lost"	2014	Erik Hassle	Somebody's Party	
"Doctor"	2014	RZA	Only One Place to Get It	
"One Step Over"	2014	The Hood Internet	Out of the Ordinary	
"Tinashe Checks In (interlude)"	2014	DJ Mustard	10 Summers	
"Xylaphone"	2014	David Andrew Sitek	At Any Cost	
"The Leap"	2014	—N/a	The Hunger Games: Mockingjay, Part 1	
"Thug Cry"	2014	ASAP Ferg	Ferg Forever	–
"Let’s Be Real Now"	2015	R. Kelly	The Buffet	
"Fearn No More (Remix)"	2015	AcetheSpade	—N/a	
"Never Catch Me” (additional vocals by Tinashe)	2015	Travis Scott	Rodeo	
"Genius of Love"	2016	DJ Cassidy	—N/a	
"How Long"	2016	Davido	Son of Mercy	
"On A Wave"	2016	Drake	—N/a	
"All Caught Up"	2016	Good Times Ahead	Good Times Ahead	
"Santa Claus Is Coming To Town"	2016	DNCE (featuring Charlie Puth, Hailee Steinfeld, Daya, Fifth Harmony, Rita Ora, Tinashe, Sabrina Carpenter, Jake Miller)	—N/a	
"Rivalry"	2017	Dj Charisma	DJ Charisma	
"Look Back" (additional vocals by Tinashe)	2018	Diplo featuring DRAM	California	
"Savannah Sunset"	2018	MadeinTYO	Sincerely, Tokyo	
"Liquid Courage"	2018	Eric Bellinger, iRap	—N/a	
"Seasons of Love"	2019	Rent: Live cast	Rent: Live – Original Soundtrack of the Live Television Event	
"Gold Teeth"	2019	Blood Orange, Project Pat, Gangsta Boo	Angel's Pulse	
"Tuesday Feeling (Choose To Stay)"	2019	Blood Orange	Angel's Pulse	
"The Worst In Me"	2019	Kaytranada	Bubba	
"Lie To Me"	2020	Yellow Claw, Runtown	Never Dies	
"Love Reggae"	2020	JoJo	Good to Know (Deluxe)	
"Ride Da Wav"	2020	Quiet Child	Cloud 9	
"Delilah"	2020	Quiet Child	Cloud 9	
"Take Your Time"	2020	Channel Tres	I Can't Go Outside	
"Disco Pantz"	2021	Rejjie Snow	Baw Baw Black Sheep	
"Our Kind of People (theme song)"	2021	—N/a	Our Kind of People soundtrack	
"Ghetto 24"	2022	Buddy	Superghetto	
"Body"	2022	Ryan Hemsworth & Giraffage	Radio Active	
"HEAT"	2022	DIXSON	004DIASY	
"Bring Out the Freaks"	2022	Quiet Child	The Curse of Bridge Hollow (Soundtrack)	
"More Than a Little Bit"	2024	Kaytranada	Timeless	
"ZOOM"	2024	Machinedrum	3FOR82	
"B2b (Remix)"	2024	Charli XCX	Brat and It's Completely Different but Also Still Brat	
"Devoted" (Additional vocals by Tinashe)	2026	Jacques Greene & Nosaj Thing	—N/a	

== Songwriting credits ==
Year	Song	Artist	Album
2014	"I Luh Ya Papi"	Jennifer Lopez featuring French Montana	A.K.A.
2015	"Waiting to Ignite"	Goldroom	—N/a
2015	"All the Way Down"	Kelela	Hallucinogen
2016	"That's My Girl"	Fifth Harmony	7/27
2016	"The Life"	Fifth Harmony	7/27
2016	"Scared of Happy"	Fifth Harmony	7/27
2016	"We Could Be More"	Star Slinger featuring Dawn Richard	We Could Be More
2017	"Hot Sauce"	Travis Scott	—N/a
2025	"Is It Real"	Flume & JPEGMafia featuring Ravyn Lenae	We Live in a Society
2026	"Devoted"	Jacques Greene & Nosaj Thing as Verses GT	—N/a

== Music videos ==
=== As lead artist ===
Title	Year	Director(s)	Ref.
"We Found Love"	2011	Tinashe	
"Can't Say No"	2011	Tinashe	
"Chainless"	2011	Bobby Brackins; Nic Nac	
"This Feeling"	2012	Cole Walliser	
"Boss"	2012	Tinashe	
"Ecstasy"	2012	Smallz and Raskind	
"Who Am I Working For?"	2013	Tinashe	
"Vulnerable" (featuring Travis Scott)	2013	Darren Craig; Patrick Morales	
"2 On" (featuring ScHoolboy Q)	2014	Hannah Lux Davis	
"Pretend" (featuring ASAP Rocky)	2014	Jonathan Desbiens	
"Aquarius Season"	2015	Tinashe	
"Bated Breath"	2015	Stephen Garnett	
"All Hands on Deck"	2015	Ben Mor	
"Cold Sweat"	2015	Stephen Garnett	
"Bet/Feels Like Vegas"	2015	Stephen Garnett	
"Player" (featuring Chris Brown)	2015	Emil Nava	
"Party Favors"	2015	Tinashe; Seth Hagenstein	
"Superlove"	2016	Hannah Lux Davis	
"Company"	2016	Jack Begert	
"Flame"	2017	Andrew Donoho	
"No Drama" (featuring Offset)	2018	Sasha Samsonova	
"Faded Love"	2018	Sasha Samsonova	
"Me So Bad" (featuring Ty Dolla $ign & French Montana)	2018	Sasha Samsonova	
"Die a Little Bit" (featuring Ms Banks)	2019	C Prinz	
"So Much Better" (featuring G-Eazy)	2019	Mynxii White	
"Save Room For Us" (Tokyo Visual)	2019	Stephen Garnett	
"Stormy Weather"	2019	Bradley J. Calder	
"Save Room for Us"	2020	Bradley J. Calder	
"Love Line" (with Shift K3Y)	2021	Sam Stone	
"Pasadena" (feat Buddy)	2021	Micaiah Carter	
"Bouncin'"	2021	Lloyd Pursall	
"X / I Can See the Future"	2022	Sebastian Sdaigui	
"Naturally"	2022	Raul Rosco Guerrero	
"HMU for a Good Time"	2022	Jonah Haber	
"Scandalous" (with Gryffin)	2022	Jamal Wade	
"Talk To Me Nice"	2023	Bradley Calder	
"Needs"	2023	Sammy Rawal	
"Uh Huh"	2023	Sammy Rawal	
"The BB/Ang3l Experience"	2024	Mike Ho	
"Nasty"	2024	Jonah Haber	
"Getting No Sleep"	2024	Jonah Haber	
"No Broke Boys"	2024	Aerin Moreno	
"Cross That Line"	2024	Jonah Haber	
"Too Easy"	2026	Onda	
"Crash Out"	2026	91 Rules	
"Melatonin"	2026	91 Rules	
"Pillow Fight"	2026	Zac Wiesel	
"Popstar"	2026		

=== As featured artist ===
List of music videos as featured artist, showing year released and directors
Title	Year	Director(s)	Ref.
"Artificial People" (OFM featuring Tinashe)	2011	Tinashe	
"Cake" (Boby Brackins featuring Tinashe)	2011	Justin Tipping	
"Body Language" (Kid Ink featuring Usher and Tinashe)	2014	Darren Craig	
"Drop That Kitty" (Ty Dolla $ign featuring Charli XCX and Tinashe)	2015	Shomi Patwary	
"All My Friends" (Snakehips featuring Tinashe and Chance The Rapper)	2015	Mister Whitmore	
"Just Say" (KDA featuring Tinashe)	2016	Sarah McColgan	
"Slumber Party" (Britney Spears featuring Tinashe)	2016	Colin Tilley	
"Only" (Zhu featuring Tinashe)	2020	Jack Murgatroyd	
"The Worst in Me" (Kaytranada featuring Tinashe)	2020	Arnaud Deroudilhe	
"Play Fight" (They. featuring Tinashe)	2020	Trent Barboza	
"Ride Da Wav" (Quiet Child featuring Tinashe)	2020	Emmett Lynch	
"Delilah" (Quiet Child featuring Tinashe)	2020	Emmett Lynch	
"Lean On Me" (Cheat Codes featuring Tinashe)	2021	Sebastian Sdaigui	
"Esther" (BAYNK featuring Tinashe)	2021	Spencer Graves	
"Who's Gonna Love You Tonight" (Snakehips featuring Tinashe)	2022	Axel Kabundji	
"Heaven" (Shygirl featuring Tinashe)	2023	N/A	

=== Cameo appearances ===
List of music videos, showing year released and directors
Title	Year	Director(s)	Ref.
"Baby" (Justin Bieber featuring Ludacris)	2010	Ray Kay	
"Blasé" (Ty Dolla Sign featuring Future & Rae Sremmurd)	2015	Alex Bittan & Tyrone Griffin	
"Faithful" (Bobby Brackins featuring Ty Dolla Sign)	2016	Byron Atienza	
"Man" (JoJo)	2020	Marc Klasfeld	
