= 333 (Tinashe album) =

- Standard cover

Studio album by Tinashe
- Released: August 6, 2021
- Recorded: 2020
- Studio: Tinashe's home studio (Los Angeles)
- Genres: Pop; R&B
- Length: 47:16
- Label: Tinashe Music
- Producers: Kingston Callaway; Iiinfinite; Sdtroy; Hitmaka; Chrishan; Mari Beatz; Dwilly; Kaytranada; Nxghts; Neenyo; Sean Momberger; Lee Major; ABsolutely; John Hill; John Blanda; Du'Lanci Vallie; Wax Motif; Ely Rise; Sam Sparro; Tido; Stargate; Todd Pritchard; Big Kidd; Kito; Jonas Karlsson; Christian Blue; Alex Lustig; Beat Billionaire; Da Boom Squad

Tinashe chronology
Comfort & Joy (2020)	333 (2021)	BB/Ang3l (2023)

Singles from 333
- 1. "Pasadena" Released: June 4, 2021; 2. "Bouncin'" Released: July 9, 2021; 3. "X" Released: January 21, 2022

Singles from 333 (Deluxe)
- 1. "Naturally" Released: February 14, 2022

333 is the fifth studio album by American singer Tinashe. It was released independently through her own label on August 6, 2021. Largely self-produced and written by Tinashe, the album was primarily recorded independently following her departure from RCA Records in 2019. 333 features collaborations with artists including Buddy, Kaytranada, Wax Motif, Jeremih, Kaash Paige, Quiet Child, and Kudazi. A pop and R&B album, 333 includes electropop and house elements, while it explores independence, self-empowerment, love, and emotional vulnerability. Its title references the angel number "333", which signifies guidance and optimism, while the cover art depicts a sci-fi-inspired image of Tinashe with three eyes amid tranquil scenery.

333 was promoted with overall four singles, "Pasadena", "Bouncin'", "X", and "Naturally". Promotion for the album included the 333 Tour as well as a deluxe edition with additional tracks. 333 received critical acclaim, with reviewers praising its cohesive production, Tinashe's versatile vocals, and genre-spanning approach. It also appeared on multiple year-end best-of lists, including Uproxx, Vibe, Spin, and Pitchfork. Commercially, the album debuted and peaked at number 175 on the US Billboard 200.

== Background ==
I started creating my music by producing and recording myself and creating my own stuff in my room at my house... That's been a very important part of how I've been able to build myself as a career, as well as my confidence as a creative.

— Tinashe, in iHeartRadio interview

Following her departure from RCA Records in 2019, Tinashe returned to independent music-making with her fourth studio album, Songs for You (2019). According to Tinashe, independence allowed her to reassess her purpose in the music industry and refine a more self-directed, "DIY" approach; she described her period of earlier career as "very much like DIY" and noted that she was filming her own music videos and recording in her room. This early period shaped her creative approach, and returning to it with her new music made her feel "so, like, in alignment and just like everything falls into place", according to her. During 2020, the COVID-19 lockdowns, she became increasingly focused on spirituality and self-empowerment. Tinashe intended the album to convey a sense of protection and optimism to listeners; much of 333 was shaped by self-reflection—including meditation and extended periods of introspection—which she said gave the album "a thread of connectivity".

Tinashe emphasized that producing and recording her own material remained central to the album's creation. She described this approach as foundational to 333, particularly as she sought to strengthen her confidence as a creator and advocate for women producers and engineers. She also acknowledged some challenges in this independent process, noting that there was "a lot of uncertainty" about how people would respond to her music and how she would fund and organize her projects. During Billboard magazine's 2022 Women in Music event, Tinashe explained that releasing the deluxe edition of 333 "[gave] the album a little bit more life", and it allowed her to create more videos as well as performances and continue[d] the era while keeping fans engaged with additional content. She expressed hope that her longtime listeners would recognize her artistic and personal growth compared to earlier projects such as Aquarius and her mixtapes, while describing the album as representative of her mindset at the time of its creation.

Its title is an allusion to the angel number, associated with messages from the divine of protection, love, and destiny. According to Uproxx, the number "333" is a "reassuring sign" that indicates one is on the correct path, acknowledging fears and anxieties while emphasizing optimism. Regarding the title selection, Tinashe commented: "I named it 333 because I really felt like I was on the right path, in alignment with what I was meant to do. I just wanted to acknowledge that." The cover artwork depicts a "sci-fi-themed" image of Tinashe crouched amid peaceful scenery, featuring three eyes.

== Release and promotion ==
=== Marketing ===
On May 28, 2021, Tinashe started to tease her fifth studio album through her social media. She posted a mysterious teaser video featuring the numbers "333" on June 1—which she had previously referenced in earlier visuals including the Tokyo version of "Save Room for Us"—and updated her social media images to match. In the video, she was shown reading the fictional "Pasadena Post", accompanied by a slowed, unreleased version of a track playing in the background. Tinashe confirmed that the album would feature collaborations with both male and female artists; she revealed that she had sent material to American singer Ariana Grande, and responded positively when asked about the possibility of a collaboration, stating: "I'd like to think so and hope so." She also publicly alleged on Twitter that her feature on Jack Harlow's song "Already Best Friends" had been replaced with a guest appearance by Chris Brown, and it drew attention due to Tinashe's previous public disagreement with Brown on social media.

On July 23, Tinashe announced details of the album, 333, including its cover art and release date. An announcement of the single "I Can See the Future" also followed at the same day. 333's release date had also been revealed in a 42-second visual clip, which depicted Tinashe with a third eye on her forehead and another on the palm of her hand. During the rollout of 333, Tinashe addressed fan inquiries about the album's physical editions—explaining that their delay was due to production issues. She also mentioned that she had additional songs recorded and teased the release of deluxe edition, when speaking about the possibility of an expanded release. On March 3, 2022, the album's deluxe edition was released, featuring four additional tracks: "Something Like a Heartbreak", "HMU for a Good Time" (featuring Channel Tres), "Naturally", and "Woke Up Blessed". She performed the song "X" at the Jimmy Kimmel Live! on March 16.

=== Singles ===
"Pasadena" featuring American rapper Buddy was released as the album's lead single on June 4, 2021. It was co-written and produced by Oliver Malcolm. The music video, directed by Micaiah Carter, premiered on June 10, on Tinashe's YouTube channel. The video was created as a collaborative effort with photography mobile-app VSCO, and was further promoted through a social media creative challenge hosted by the company which encouraged users to create and share contents inspired by the music video, using the hashtag #VSCOPasadena. The second single "Bouncin'" was released on July 9; its music video was subsequently released on July 14, directed by Lloyd Pursall and choreographed by Parris Goebel. "I Can See the Future" was released as a promotional single on July 23, along with the album's track list announcement.

The third single of 333, "X", featuring Jeremih, was released on January 21, 2022, alongside a music video of both "X" and "I Can See the Future", directed by Sebastian Sdaigui. In August 2022, "X" was serviced to urban and rhythmic radios. "Naturally" was released as the lead single from the album's deluxe edition on February 14. It was promoted with a music video, inspired by the horror movie The Texas Chain Saw Massacre. The music video for "HMU for a Good Time", featuring Channel Tres, was surprise released on June 24, directed by Jonah Haber and choreographed by Jojo Gomez.

== Composition ==
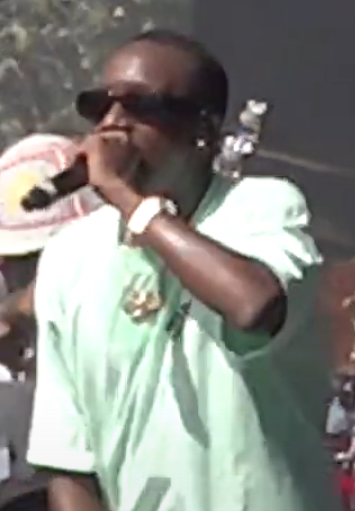
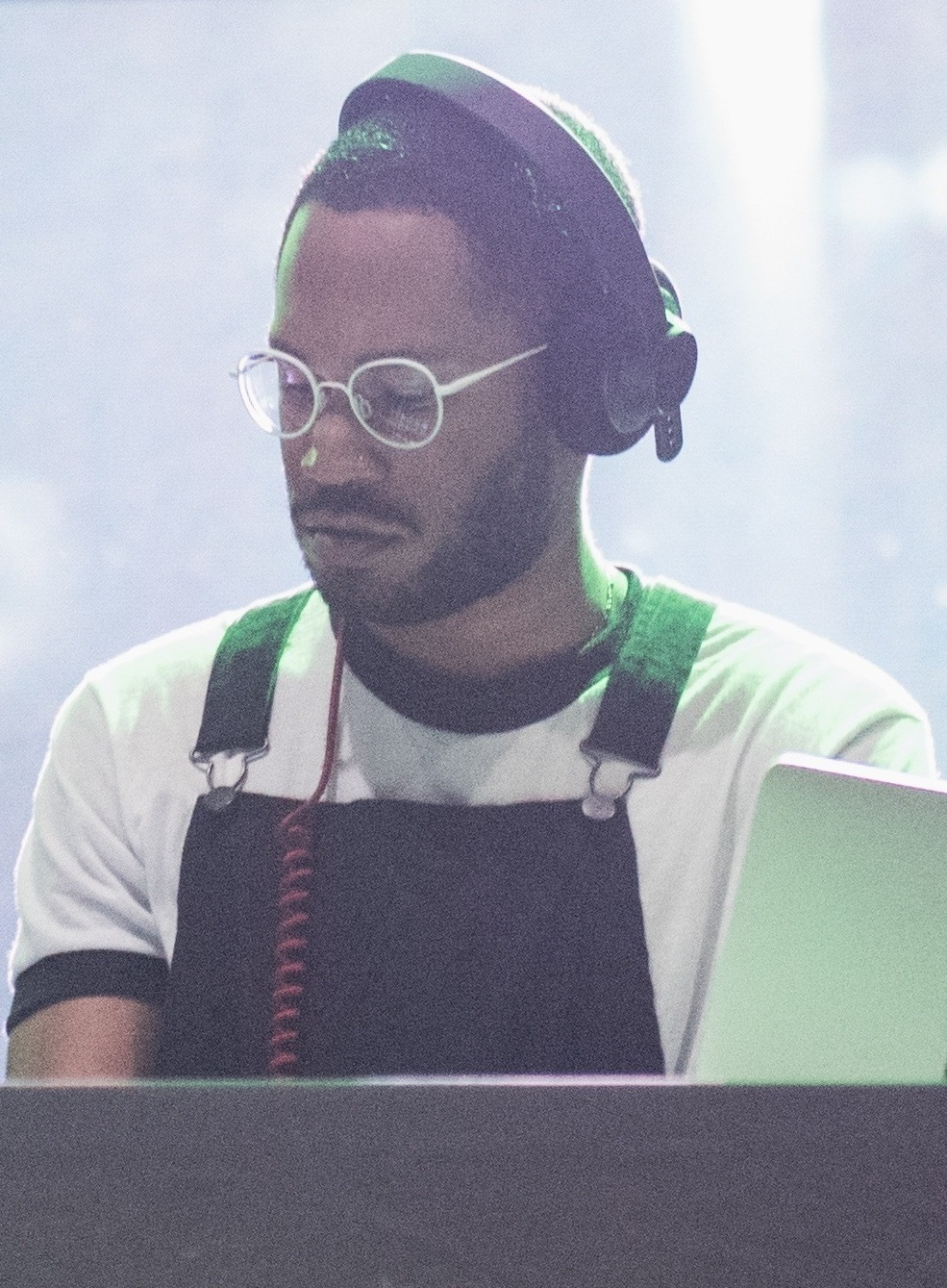
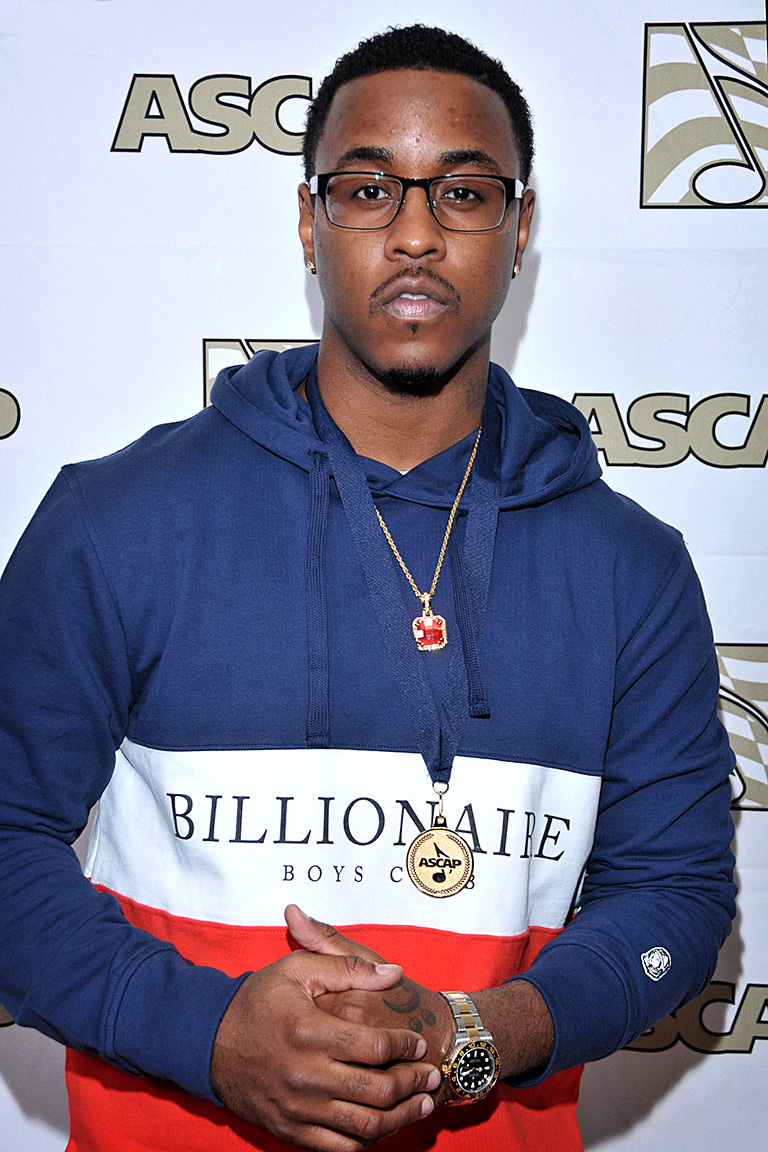
Tinashe collaborated with Buddy (left), Kaytranada (center), and Jeremih (right) on tracks from 333, among others.

333 is a pop and R&B album that traverses variety of genres such as electropop and house in a way that made "the act of listening into a game of Duck, Duck, Goose". It continues Tinashe's movement away from the conventional "pop princess" image associated with her former label. According to Clash, 333 is "a kaleidoscope of R&B versatility" that prioritizes eclecticism within contemporary narratives of "hot girl summers, freedom, and occasional heartbreak". Beyond these, the record "continues to build a catalogue of diverse, listenable R&B" and incorporates "a speedy and atmospheric drum'n'bass interlude" carried by Tinashe's falsetto.

Throughout the album, Tinashe collaborated with various artists like Buddy, Kaytranada, Wax Motif, Jeremih, Kaash Paige, Quiet Child and Kudazi. She then moves across "an eclectic landscape of sounds", centered on "fluttery impressionistic R&B" but extending to "neon arena anthems" like the Stargate-produced "The Chase", "undulating synth-pop" on "Undo (Back to My Heart)" with Motif, "breathless dance-adjacent hip-hop" on the Buddy collaboration "Pasadena", and "darkly spacious slow jams" on the Paige duet "Angels". Later songs move through "changes in tempo, style, and mood", with high-tension beats dropping out and returning in altered form as transitions are handled either by Tinashe herself or by featured artists.

=== Music and lyrics ===
"Pasadena"
The 12-second sample of "Pasadena" highlights Oliver Malcolm's frenetic, "Hey Ya!"-sampling production.

333 opens with "Let Go", described by Financial Times as "a track about finding release after a break-up", pairing its theme with contrasting elements such as birdsong and bass. "I Can See the Future" is a bassy R&B song which features Tinashe's more percussive and "rap-like cadences". "X" is a "bouncy" song that conveys "erotic energy" with a balance of nimbleness and intensity, presenting both artists' liberated musical approach. "Shy Guy" briefly experiments with a jungle beat for just over a minute before moving on. "Bouncin'" is noted as an "irresistibly catchy" track designed to embed itself in the listener's mind. A dance track "Unconditional" opens with "uptempo, dance-ready production" before easing into a slower second half, a shift that Uproxx noted aligns with Tinashe's request for "love without restriction" as she offers the same in return. "Angels" captures a moment that is simultaneously sad and sensual. The title track adopts no chorus and a more rapturous tone, offering "an account of sunrise in the arms of another". "Undo (Back to My Heart)" is a "crowd-friendly dance" and "pop-leaning" song that accelerates into a "1980s pop reminiscent of the Weeknd". "Let Me Down Slowly" is presented as a moodier track, where Tinashe appears "heartbroken and in denial". The following track, "Last Call", is "rich with detail" that makes collective standout moment on the album. "The Chase" is a pop rock song and "Rihanna-esque power ballad" that presents a narrator who has moved on and refuses to seek a past lover's return. "Pasadena" is structured around a sample from OutKast's "Hey Ya!" (2003). According to Clash, the song favors "ambience over substance" with its razor-sharp synths. At four and a half minutes, "Small Reminders" is the album's longest track, which evolves from "smoldering jazz" into "doobie-lighting funk". Following the club-ready charm of "Bouncin'", "Bouncin' Pt. II" presents a darker and cavernous atmosphere.

"Naturally"
The 23-second sample of "Naturally". It features twang-tinged guitar and a lightly disco-styled rhythm section.

The deluxe edition opener "Something Like a Heartbreak" combines layered vocal melodies and "twitchy electronic rhythms" over a steady bass line. It also presents a narrator who concludes, "You didn't deserve my love", and later adds that she is "thankful that you cracked me open". "HMU for a Good Time" is noted as an "electrifying house-infused pop record", whose music video presents an energetic party setting that indicates the track's title. Stereogum depicted "Naturally" as a "smooth and effortless bop", while The Fader described it as a tribute to "the most sensual kind of muscle memory", saying that Tinashe's performance over "twangy guitar" and a "gently disco-fied rhythm section" aimed at drawing a specific person to the dancefloor. Rated R&B found that "Woke Up Blessed" stands out as the closing song, among the new tracks.

== Critical reception ==
Professional ratings
Aggregate scores
Source	Rating
Metacritic	84/100
Review scores
Source	Rating
AllMusic	4.5/5 stars
Clash	7/10
Financial Times	4/5 stars
NME	4/5 stars
Pitchfork	7.8/10
Rhythmer	4/5 stars
Stereoboard	3/5 stars

According to the review aggregator Metacritic, 333 received "universal acclaim" based on a weighted average score of 84 out of 100 from 5 critic scores.

Clash called the album "a sparkling display of personal evolution" and despite not being a radically innovative record, it is coherent with "artful production", and "never having a dull moment". They also praised Tinashe's vocals as "faultless as ever" with "rap-like cadences." Giving four out of five stars, NME said 333 "furthers the 28-year-old's narrative of being whatever she wants to be musically". They said the album also "gives off the same energy as Tinashe's early mixtapes such as Black Water (2013) and In Case We Die (2012), reminding us of the singular artist that [she] is and always has been." Pitchfork named 333 her best work to date, stating it was a "showcase for her omnivorous tastes and supremely light touch". They concluded that the "breezy, impish spirit" is what most distinguishes 333 and its predecessor from her previous RCA albums. Stereoboard described 333 as adding to Tinashe's "catalogue of diverse, listenable R&B", but wrote that the album "levels out at mediocre", as remarking that this was "surprising given the promise of the first half". The review suggested that this outcome may reflect "not enough risks having been taken, nor freedom deployed". EastMojo described the album as "catchy" but criticized its lyrics as "mediocre."

AllMusic claimed that 333 sees Tinashe truly settling into independence. They noted that the album features a near surplus of "breathy slow jams" and "midtempo cuts" and praised how she uniquely tweaked the approach of each track to ensure a fresh sound. Stereogum praised the cohesiveness of the album in comparison to her previous works. Uproxx noted that while the COVID-19 pandemic may appear to be a primary influence, the album's inspiration runs much deeper for Tinashe.

=== Year-end lists ===
Uproxx included the album in both The 50 Best Albums of 2021 and The 15 Best R&B Albums of 2021, while Vibe ranked it No. 2 on The 21 Best R&B Albums of 2021. The album was also placed at No. 5 on 34th Street's The Best Albums of 2021, and Spin ranked it No. 9 on The 30 Best Albums of 2021, additionally listing "Bouncin'" at No. 11 on The 30 Best Songs of 2021.

Further recognition included PopBuzz's placement of the album at No. 14 on The 30 Best Albums of 2021 and Okayplayer ranking it No. 16. Insider Inc. featured 333 at No. 19 on its year-end list, followed by Cosmopolitan at No. 22. Slant Magazine ranked it No. 35 on The 50 Best Albums of 2021. Pitchfork selected 333 for its unranked feature The Best Progressive Pop Music of 2021, and placed "Bouncin'" at No. 16 on The 100 Best Songs of 2021. Stereogum ranked "Pasadena" at No. 28 on The Best Pop Songs of 2021, and included "X" in its unranked The Best Songs of 2021. HipHopDX featured "Bouncin'" and "Angels" at Nos. 26 and 45, respectively, on The Best R&B Songs of the Year. Additional recognition came from NPR, which ranked "X" at No. 90 on The 100 Best Songs of 2021, and BrooklynVegan, which placed "X" at No. 3 on 15 R&B Songs That Defined 2021.

== Tour ==
To promote the album, Tinashe announced the 333 Tour, with Rei Ami as the supporting act. Tickets went on sale on July 16, with pre-sale and VIP packages available from July 13, through Tinashe's official website. After several dates were sold out, new dates were added to the tour. The tour was set to conclude with a "worldwide digital experience", described as "a full-length creative production specially crafted for at-home fans around the world", in partnership with Moment House.

The tour was divided in two segments, the 2021 Tour and the 'Summer '22 Tour' and had four legs, of which the first began on September 16, 2021 and the fourth concluded on August 28, 2022. The tour visited Europe and North America. The tour was Tinashe's first independent headlining tour, after having to postpone the 2020 tour Tour For You due to the COVID-19 pandemic. Regarding the accompanying tour, Tinashe described performing live again after an extended absence from audiences as an important experience that allowed her to reconnect with listeners and share the album's music directly.

=== Shows ===
List of concerts, showing date, city, country and venue
Date	City	Country	Venue
2021 Tour: North America
September 16, 2021	Houston	United States	House of Blues Texas
September 18, 2021	Austin, Texas	United States	Emo's Austin
September 19, 2021	Dallas	United States	House of Blues Dallas
September 21, 2021	Minneapolis	United States	First Avenue
September 22, 2021	Milwaukee	United States	The Rave/Eagles Club
September 23, 2021	Urbana, Illinois	United States	Canopy Club
September 24, 2021	Chicago	United States	House of Blues Chicago
September 25, 2021	Chicago	United States	House of Blues Chicago
September 27, 2021	Royal Oak, Michigan	United States	Royal Oak Music Theatre
September 28, 2021	Pittsburgh	United States	Roxian Theatre
September 29, 2021	Boston	United States	Big Night Live
September 30, 2021	New York City	United States	Terminal 5
October 2, 2021	Brooklyn	United States	Warsaw
October 3, 2021 (show 1)	Washington, D.C.	United States	9:30 Club
October 3, 2021 (show 2)	Washington, D.C.	United States	9:30 Club
October 4, 2021	Philadelphia	United States	Theatre of Living Arts
October 6, 2021	Atlanta	United States	Buckhead Theatre
October 7, 2021	St. Louis	United States	The Pageant
October 9, 2021	Denver	United States	Summit Music Hall
October 10, 2021	Salt Lake City	United States	The Depot
October 12, 2021	Sacramento, California	United States	Ace of Spades
October 14, 2021	Phoenix, Arizona	United States	The Van Buren
October 15, 2021	San Diego	United States	The Observatory North Park
October 16, 2021	Santa Ana, California	United States	Observatory
October 17, 2021	Los Angeles	United States	The Novo
October 19, 2021	San Francisco	United States	Warfield Theatre
October 21, 2021	Seattle	United States	The Showbox
October 24, 2021	333 Tour Experience	Worldwide Moment House	N/A
November 13, 2021	Las Vegas (Day N Vegas)	United States	Las Vegas Festival Grounds
December 30, 2021	Los Angeles	United States	The Novo
2022 Tour: North America
June 8, 2022	Washington, D.C. (Palaces World Tour)	United States	The Anthem
June 9, 2022	Washington, D.C. (Palaces World Tour)	United States	The Anthem
June 10, 2022	Philadelphia (Palaces World Tour)	United States	The Mann Center for the Performing Arts
June 12, 2022	Raleigh, North Carolina (Palaces World Tour)	United States	Red Hat Amphitheater
June 15, 2022	Orlando, Florida (Palaces World Tour)	United States	Orlando Amphitheater
June 17, 2022	New York City (Ladyland Festival)	United States	The Brooklyn Mirage
June 19, 2022	Manchester, Tennessee	United States	Bonnaroo
2022 Tour: Europe
July 5, 2022	Amsterdam	Netherlands	Melkweg
July 6, 2022	Paris	France	Bataclan
July 7, 2022	London	United Kingdom	Electric Brixton
July 9, 2022	Montreux	Switzerland	Montreux Jazz Lab
July 10, 2022	Madrid (Mad Cool Festival)	Spain	IFEMA Palacio Municipal
July 11, 2022	Barcelona	Spain	Sala Apolo
July 14, 2022	Pori (Pori Jazz Festival)	Finland	Sala Apolo
2022 Tour: North America
July 29, 2022	Chicago (Lollapalooza)	United States	Grant Park
July 31, 2022	Montreal (Osheaga Festival)	Canada	Parc Jean-Drapeau
August 28, 2022	Pasadena, California (This Ain't No Picnic Festival)	United States	Brookside Park

=== Setlist ===
1. "I Can See the Future"
2. "X"
3. "Small Reminders"
4. "Cold Sweat"
5. "Soul Glitch"
6. "Touch & Go"
7. "Throw a Fit"
8. "Link Up"
9. "How Many Times"
10. "Like I Used To"
11. "Ghetto Boy"
12. "So Much Better"
13. "Life's Too Short"
14. "Story of Us"
15. "Feelings"
16. "The Worst in Me"
17. "Die a Little Bit"
18. "Hopscotch"
19. "2 On"
20. "All Hands on Deck"
21. "Rascal (Superstar)"
22. "So Much Better"
23. "Ooh La La"
24. "Bouncin’, Pt. 2"
25. "Last Call"
26. "The Chase"
27. "No Drama"
28. "Cash Race"
29. "Bouncin"
30. "Save Room for Us"
31. "Undo (Back to My Heart)"
32. "Pasadena"

== Track listing ==
Standard edition
No.	Title	Writer(s)	Producer(s)	Length
1.	"Let Go"	Tinashe Kachingwe; Thomas Callaway; Charlie Smalls	Kingston Callaway	1:53
2.	"I Can See the Future"	Kachingwe; Derrick Milano; Devin Mitchell; Troy Artopoeus	Iiinfinite; sdtroy	2:56
3.	"X" (featuring Jeremih)	Kachingwe; Drew Love; Jeremy Felton	Hitmaka; Chrishan; Mari Beatz	2:51
4.	"Shy Guy"	Kachingwe; Olivia Miraldi; David Wilson	Dwilly	1:06
5.	"Bouncin'"	Kachingwe; Jade Mckenzie; Wilson	Dwilly	2:55
6.	"Unconditional"	Kachingwe; Louis Celestin; Joyce Silveira Moreno	Kaytranada	3:17
7.	"Angels" (featuring Kaash Paige)	Kachingwe; Elijah Ross; Sean Seaton; Sean Momberger; D'Kyla Woolen; Leigh Elliot	Nxghts; Neenyo; Momberger; Lee Major	2:49
8.	"333" (featuring ABsolutely)	Abby-Lynn Keen; John Hill; John Blanda	Absolutely; Hill; Blanda; Du'Lanci Vallie	3:01
9.	"Undo (Back to My Heart)" (featuring Wax Motif)	Kachingwe; Danny Chien; Ely Weisfeld	Wax Motif; Ely Rise	3:17
10.	"Let Me Down Slowly"	Kachingwe; Samuel Falson	Sam Sparro	3:05
11.	"Last Call"	Kachingwe; Mckenzie; Nguyen Le Hoang Khoa; Chris Wallace	Tido	3:40
12.	"The Chase"	Kachingwe; Keen; Bobby Brackins; Tor Erik Hermansen; Mikkel Eriksen	Stargate	3:11
13.	"Pasadena" (featuring Buddy)	Kachingwe; Oliver Malcolm; Simmie Sims III; Todd Pritchard	Todd Pritchard; Big Kidd	2:56
14.	"Small Reminders"	Kachingwe; Jonas Karlsson; Christian Waite; Maiike Kito Lebbing	Kito; Karlsson; Christian Blue	4:30
15.	"Bouncin', Pt. 2"	Kachingwe; Wilson; Mckenzie; Alexander Lustig	Alex Lustig	3:21
16.	"It's a Wrap" (featuring Quiet Child and Kudzai)	Kachingwe; Thulani Kachingwe; Kudzai Kachingwe; Shannon Cooke; Kenneth Akridge; Joseph Love; Anthony Clary; Albert Speaks	Beat Billionaire; Da Boom Squad	2:20
Total length:				47:16

Deluxe edition
No.	Title	Writer(s)	Producer(s)	Length
17.	"Something Like a Heartbreak"	Kachingwe; Ezra Rubin; Sheldon Young	Kingdom	3:08
18.	"HMU for a Good Time" (featuring Channel Tres)	Kachingwe; Leven Kali Simon-Seay; Jamil Chammas; Young	Leven Kali; Digi; Channel Tres	4:07
19.	"Naturally"	Kachingwe; Max Fogelstrom; Mark Landon; Dimi Sloane Sesson II; Dallas Caton; Keen	Midi Jones; M-Phazes; Dallas Caton	3:14
20.	"Woke Up Blessed" (featuring Christian Blue)	Kachingwe; Waite	Christian Blue	3:32
Total length:				61:17

=== Notes ===
- "Unconditional" contains a hidden track called "I Dare You" starting at 1:11.

== Personnel ==
Credits were adapted from Tidal.

- Tinashe Jorgensen Kachingwe – composer, lyricist (all tracks)
- Jeremih – featured artist (3)
- Kaash Paige – featured artist (7)
- Absolutely – featured artist (8)
- Wax Motif – featured artist (9)
- Buddy – featured artist (13)
- Kudzai – featured artist (16)
- Quiet Child – featured artist (16)
- Channel Tres – featured artist (18)

== Charts ==
Weekly chart performance
Chart (2021)	Peak position
UK Album Downloads (Official Charts)	56
US Billboard 200	175
US Independent Albums (Billboard)	23
US Top R&B Albums (Billboard)	20

== Release history ==
Release dates and formats
Region	Date	Format(s)	Edition	Label	Ref.
Various	August 6, 2021	CD; digital download; LP; streaming	Standard	Tinashe Music	
Various	March 3, 2022	Digital download; streaming	Deluxe	Tinashe Music	
