= I'd Rather Be Alone =

Promotional single by Tinashe

from the album Popstar
- Released: September 10, 2026
- Genre: Electro; R&B
- Length: 3:15
- Label: Tinashe Music; Nice Life; Atlantic
- Songwriters: Tinashe Kachingwe; Zack Sekoff; Ricky Reed
- Producers: Zack Sekoff; Ricky Reed

Audio
- "I'd Rather Be Alone" on YouTube

"I'd Rather Be Alone" is a song by American singer and songwriter Tinashe from her eighth studio album, Popstar (2026). It was released on September 10, 2026, by Tinashe Music, Nice Life Recording Company, and Atlantic Records, as the fourth single from the album alongside "Pillow Fight".

== Background and release ==
On September 10, 2026, Tinashe released the new tracks "Pillow Fight" and "I'd Rather Be Alone", a preview of her eighth studio album, Popstar, scheduled for release on September 25. Marking the fourth singles and first promotional single from the album, they followed the releases of their previous singles "Too Easy", "Crash Out", and "Melatonin".

== Composition ==
"I'd Rather Be Alone" is an electro and R&B ballad characterized by distorted electric guitars and vocal harmonies. It explores the aftermath of a relationship, particularly in the lack of attention Tinashe's partner would give her. Alicia Urrea of Billboard stated that it presents a more vulnerable side of Tinashe's R&B-oriented sound, and Cassidy Sollazzo of Paste compared the song to Rihanna's Anti (2016).
