= Pillow Fight (Tinashe song) =

Single by Tinashe

from the album Popstar
- Released: September 10, 2026
- Genre: R&B
- Length: 2:21
- Label: Tinashe Music; Nice Life; Atlantic
- Songwriters: Tinashe Kachingwe; Ricky Reed; Efrat Alony; Mark Reinke
- Producer: Ricky Reed

Tinashe singles chronology
"Melatonin" (2026)	"Pillow Fight" (2026)

Music video
- "Pillow Fight" on YouTube

"Pillow Fight" is a song by American singer Tinashe from her eighth studio album, Popstar (2026). It was released on September 10, 2026, by Tinashe Music, Nice Life Recording Company, and Atlantic Records, as the fourth single from the album alongside "I'd Rather Be Alone". Produced by Ricky Reed, "Pillow Fight" was written by Reed, Tinashe, Efrat Alony and Mark Reinke.

== Background and release ==
On September 10, 2026, Tinashe released the new tracks "Pillow Fight" and "I'd Rather Be Alone", a preview of her eighth studio album, Popstar, scheduled for release on September 25. Marking the fourth single from the album, they followed the releases of their previous singles "Too Easy", "Crash Out", and "Melatonin". The accompanying music video for "Pillow Fight" was directed by Zac Wiesel and was released on the same day.

== Composition ==
Combining a steady groove with a flirtatious tone, "Pillow Fight" is an R&B song that drew comparisons to Mariah Carey's 1990s songs. "Pillow Fight" contains a sample of Laura Branigan's 1984 song "Self Control" at the start. HotNewHipHop author Alexander Cole felt that the song had more party vibe than "I'd Rather Be Alone", which was "all about the ballads".

== Charts ==
Chart performance
Chart (2026)	Peak position
New Zealand Hot Singles (RMNZ)	23
