= Michael Calfan =

French house music producer (born 1990)

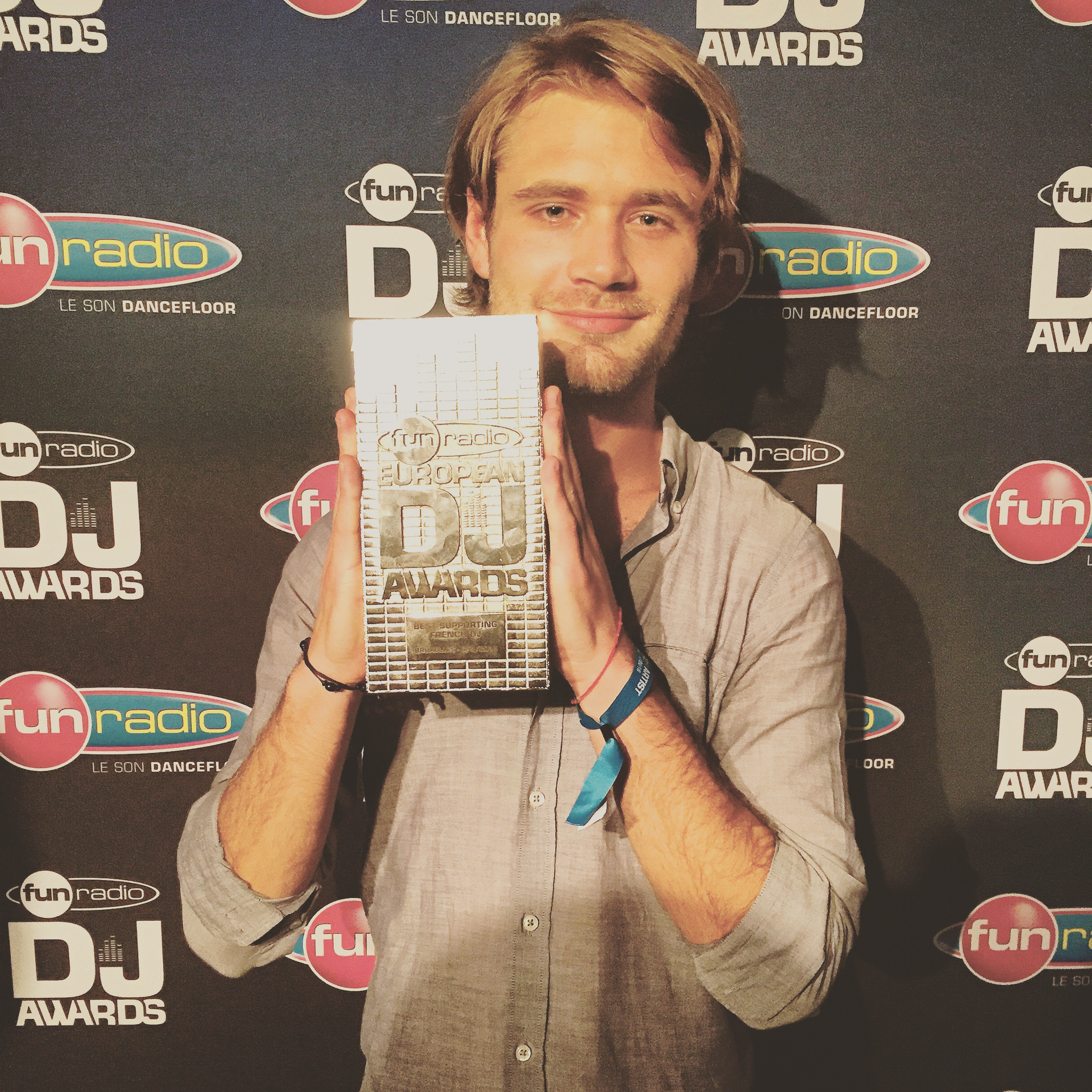
- Calfan in 2015

Background information
- Born: 12 November 1990 (age 35); Paris, France
- Genres: House; future house; deep house; progressive house; electro house
- Occupations: DJ; record producer
- Instruments: Piano; guitar; synthesizer
- Years active: 2008–present
- Labels: Yellow Productions; Axtone Records; Spinnin' Records, Spinnin' Deep
- Website: www.michaelcalfan.com

Michael Calfan (born 12 November 1990) is a French DJ and house music producer.

== Biography ==
Calfan was born in 1990 in Paris, France to François Valéry and Nicole Calfan. In 2008, he was discovered by Bob Sinclar who was also noted as one of the most promising artists of his label Yellow Productions.

In late 2011, the single "Resurrection" was released through Axwell's record label Axtone Records.

In 2014, he released the single "Prelude" through Spinnin' Records (which entered the Billboard Dance/Mix Show Airplay) and "Treasured Soul", which reached number 17 in the singles chart in the United Kingdom in April 2015.

Following the success of "Treasured Soul," Calfan expanded his profile as a cross-genre remixer, producing official versions for global pop and electronic artists including Calvin Harris, Charli XCX, and Troye Sivan. In 2022, he further established his presence in the house-pop crossover space with a high-energy remix of St Lundi’s "Nights Like This," released on the BLENDED label.

It is rumored but not yet confirmed that Calfan now produces under the presudonym Swimming Paul.

== Discography ==
=== Charting and certified singles ===
Year	Title	Peak chart positions							Certifications	Album
Year	Title	FRA	BEL (Fl)	BEL (Wa)	NLD	SWI	UK	US Airplay	Certifications	Album
2011	"Resurrection"	199	58	79	63	—	—	—		Non-album singles
2014	"Prelude"	—	128	—	—	—	—	33		Non-album singles
2015	"Treasured Soul"	101	81	73	—	66	17	—	BPI: Gold	Non-album singles
2015	"Mercy"	—	121	—	—	—	—	—		Non-album singles
2015	"Breaking the Doors"	—	126	—	—	—	—	—		Non-album singles
2016	"Thorns" (featuring Raphaélla)	—	—^{[A]}	—	—	—	—	—		Non-album singles
2016	"Nobody Does It Better"	—	—	—	—	—	—	—	BPI: Silver	Non-album singles
"—" denotes a recording that did not chart or was not released in that territory.

=== Singles ===
Year	Track name	Record label	Album
2008	"Twisted Bitch"	Yellow Productions	Non-album singles
2010	"The Bomb"	Bob Sinclair Digital	Non-album singles
2010	"Ching Choing" (featuring Kyle Styles)	Bob Sinclair Digital	Non-album singles
2010	"She Wants It"	Yellow Productions	Non-album singles
2011	"Black Rave"	Bob Sinclair Digital	The Black Rave EP
2011	"Leather"	Bob Sinclair Digital	The Black Rave EP
2011	"Spider"	Bob Sinclair Digital	The Black Rave EP
2013	"Falcon"	Protocol Recordings	Non-album singles
2014	"Feel The Love" (with Fedde Le Grand featuring Max C)	Flamingo Recordings	Non-album singles
2014	"Let Your Mind Go" (with John Dahlbäck featuring Andy P)	Spinnin' Records	Non-album singles
2016	"Brothers"	Spinnin' Records	Non-album singles
2016	"Over Again"	Spinnin' Records	Non-album singles
2018	"On You"	Warner Bros. Records	Non-album singles
2018	"Got You"	Warner Bros. Records	Non-album singles
2018	"It's Wrong" (featuring Danny Dearden)	Warner Bros. Records	Non-album singles
2018	"Sydney's Song"	Warner Bros. Records	Non-album singles
2019	"My Place" (featuring Ebenezer)	Warner Bros. Records	Non-album singles
2019	"Wild Game" (featuring Monique Lawz)	Spinnin' Records	Non-album singles
2019	"Could Be You" (featuring Danny Dearden)	Spinnin' Records	Non-album singles
2020	"No Lie" (with Martin Solveig)	Spinnin' Records	Non-album singles
2020	"Last Call"	Spinnin' Records	Non-album singles
2020	"Call Me Now" (with Inna)	Spinnin' Records	Non-album singles
2021	"Bittersweet"	Spinnin' Records	Non-album singles
2021	"Body"	Spinnin' Records	Non-album singles
2021	"Phase Me" (featuring Richard Judge)	Headroom Records	Non-album singles
2021	"Feeling After Dark" (with Harber featuring Nisha)	Musical Freedom	Non-album singles
2021	"Imagining" (featuring Gabrielle Aplin)	Warner Music	Non-album singles
2021	"Silhouette" (featuring Coldabank)	Spinnin' Records	Non-album singles
2022	"3, 2, 1" (with Nadia Ali)	Spinnin' Records	Non-album singles
2022	"Better" (with Leo Stannard)	Spinnin' Records	Non-album singles

Bonuses: Michael Calfan & IMAN - Blinded By The Lights, Michael Calfan - Eighteen (2022)

=== Remixes ===
2019

- Calvin Harris and Rag'n'Bone Man — "Giant" (Michael Calfan Remix)
- Glowie — "Cruel" (Michael Calfan Remix)
- Not3s — "Wanting" (Michael Calfan Remix)
- Labrinth — "Miracle" (Michael Calfan Remix)
- Kiiara — "Open My Mouth" (Michael Calfan Remix)
- Hayden James — "Nowhere to Go" (Michael Calfan Remix)

2020

- Iamnotshane — "Afterlife" (Michael Calfan Remix)
- Michael Calfan and Martin Solveig — "No Lie" (Michael Calfan Remix)
- Illenium — "Nightlight" (Michael Calfan Remix)
- Sigala and James Arthur — "Lasting Lover" (Michael Calfan Remix)

2021

- Cheat Codes and Tinashe — "Lean on Me" (Michael Calfan Remix)
- Jason Derulo - "Acapulco" (Michael Calfan Remix)
