= Iamnotshane =

American singer-songwriter

iamnotshane
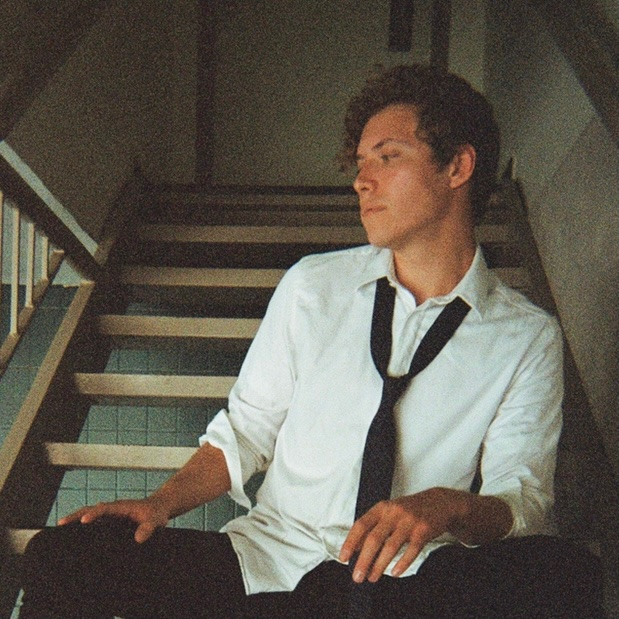
- Born: Shane Niemi; 2 August 1991 (age 34); Los Angeles, California, U.S.
- Occupations: Singer, songwriter
- Musical career
- Genres: Pop
- Instrument: Vocals
- Label: Chasing The Wind Music
- Website: iamnotshane.com

Shane Niemi (born August 2, 1991), known by his stage name iamnotshane (stylized in all lowercase), is an American singer and songwriter.

He became known for his music video for his 2016 song "Insecure", which includes a version of Michael Jackson's anti-gravity lean and has been viewed over 5 million times

== History ==
Niemi was born in Los Angeles. He has been performing since the age of 8 and began writing original songs at age 12. In 2014, he posted his first music video for "Sinister". A year later he released his first EP Sad. In 2016, his music video for "Insecure" went viral and as of 2022 has 6.5 million views on YouTube.

He later changed his stage name to iamnotshane and released his self-titled EP iamnotshane in 2020 through Avant Garden and Island Records.

In 2020, French producer and DJ Michael Calfan did a remix of Afterlife.

For unknown reasons, he left Avant Garden and Island Records and began releasing singles independently in late 2020.

In 2021, he gave an interview for the fashion magazine Vanity Teen, recounting his beginnings as an artist and his current influence.

== Discography ==
=== Extended plays ===
Title	Details
Sad	Released: May 29, 2016; Labels: Self-released; Formats: digital download
iamnotshane	Released: February 21, 2020; Labels: Avant Garden, Island Records; Formats: digital download
One Less Year Alive	Released: April 1, 2021; Labels: Chasing The Wind Music; Formats: digital download

=== Singles ===
- "Sinister" (2014)
- "Insecure" (2016)
- "Dance" (2017)
- "Losers" (2017)
- "Play Good Music at My Funeral" (2017)
- "Trick" (2018)
- "Lifeguard" (2018)
- "Afterlife" (2019)
- "Security" (2019)
- "Back to You" (2019)
- "Perfect" (2020)
- "What a Perfect Day for Crying" (2020)
- "I'm Leaving, Sorry for Your Loss" (2020)
- "Unemotional" (2020)
- "Paint a Smile on That Face!" (2020)
- "Ugly Thoughts" (2020)
- "Just Buried!" (2020)
- "Feelings an How to Destroy Them" (2021)
- "Punch Me in the Face" (2021)
- "Don't Say That" (2021)
- "Maybe My Soulmate Died" (2022)
- "What Doesn't Kill You Mutates and Tries Again" (2022)
- "I've Been Nothing but Funny and Sexy to You" (2023)
- "Plot Twist" (2023)
- "It's Halloween" (2024)
