= Treasured Soul =

Single by Michael Calfan
- Released: January 12, 2015
- Recorded: 2014
- Genre: Deep house, tropical house
- Length: 4:24
- Label: Spinnin' Records
- Songwriter: Michael Calfan
- Producer: Michael Calfan

Michael Calfan singles chronology
"Prelude" (2014)	"Treasured Soul" (2015)	"Mercy" (2015)

"Treasured Soul" is a song recorded by French DJ and producer Michael Calfan. The song was released on 12 January 2015 for digital download. The single peaked at number 17 in the UK, number 66 in Switzerland and number 101 in France.

== Track listing ==
- Digital download
1. "Treasured Soul" – 4:24
- Treasured Soul (Chocolate Puma Remix)
1. "Treasured Soul" (Chocolate Puma Remix) – 5:30
- Treasured Soul (The Remixes)
1. "Treasured Soul" (Kryder & Genairo Nvilla Remix) – 5:05
2. "Treasured Soul" (Amine Edge & DANCE Remix) – 5:54
3. "Treasured Soul" (Godford Remix) – 3:28

== Charts ==
Chart (2015)	Peak position
Belgium (Ultratip Bubbling Under Flanders)	31
Belgium (Ultratip Bubbling Under Wallonia)	23
France (SNEP)	101
Poland (Video Chart)	3
Switzerland (Schweizer Hitparade)	66
UK Singles (Official Charts)	17

== Certifications ==
Region	Certification	Certified units/sales
United Kingdom (BPI)	Gold	400,000^{‡}
^{‡} Sales+streaming figures based on certification alone.
