= Touch & Go (Tinashe and 6lack song) =

Single by Tinashe with 6lack

from the album Songs for You
- Released: November 7, 2019
- Length: 4:17
- Label: Tinashe Music
- Songwriters: Lisa Scinta; Elliot Trent; Dimitri McDowell; Brian Bates; Ricardo Valentine; Tinashe Kachingwe
- Producer: Killah B

Tinashe singles chronology
"Die a Little Bit" (2019)	"Touch & Go" (2019)	"Save Room for Us" (2019)

6lack singles chronology
"How TF" (2019)	"Touch & Go" (2019)	"Let It Rain" (2019)

Audio video
- "Touch & Go" on YouTube

"Touch & Go" is a song by American singer Tinashe. It was released on October 24, 2019 through Tinashe's independent label, Tinashe Music Inc., as the second single from Tinashe's fourth studio album, Songs for You (2019). An American singer 6lack is credited as a co-artist of the song. Tinashe and 6lack co-wrote "Touch & Go" with Elliot Trent, Dimitri McDowell and Brian Bates, Killah B produced the song. The track follows Tinashe's previous single, "Die a Little Bit", collaboration with Ms Banks. The remix version which Tarro featured was released on July 10, 2020.

== Background and release ==
Following the announcement of her independent album Songs for You, Tinashe released "Touch & Go" as the album's second single which features Atlanta singer 6lack. The song follows previous single, "Die a Little Bit" featuring Ms Banks. Tinashe hosted a series of listening events in London and Los Angeles, where she previewed unreleased songs and spoke openly about reclaiming her artistic direction.

Around the same period, she appeared in Elle's Song Association series, where she previewed additional material from Songs for You, revisited earlier hits, and discussed her creative partnership with 6lack, further framing the single within her renewed independent era.

== Composition ==
Lyrically, "Touch & Go" explores the tension of a relationship on the verge of falling apart, with both artists portraying partners uncertain of whether to continue or let go. Tinashe confesses, "Wish you would say somethin' to make me change my mind, got me feelin' like somebody else" and then continues that she has been patient yet left "tired of sleepin' by myself". 6lack admits that he has been "kickin' it back", and he reflects on their fading communication — reduced mostly to physical intimacy — remarking, "Good head make you forget what you said". The track closes with Tinashe repeating the chorus, urging her partner to stop prioritizing his own comfort and to meet her halfway.

== Critical reception ==
Sophie Caraan of Hypebeast described "Touch & Go" as a return to Tinashe's musical roots, noting that the track delivers a "formulaic yet authentic" approach to the genre. Stereogum editor Tom Breihan depicted the song as a "slow and emotional just-before-the-breakup song", portraying Tinashe and 6lack as two partners "trying to figure out whether to keep their relationship together".

== Live performance ==
On March 30, 2020, Tinashe performed "Touch & Go" during her Billboard's Live at-Home session, held to raise funds for Meals on Wheels America. Streaming from her home studio, she delivered a short set that included "Life's Too Short", "Wanderer", and "Touch & Go". She also informed viewers that rescheduled dates for her postponed tour would be announced soon.

== Release history ==
Region	Date	Version	Format(s)	Label	Ref.
Various	November 7, 2019	Original	Digital download; streaming	Tinashe Music	
Various	July 10, 2020	Remix	Digital download; streaming	Tinashe Music	
