= Pasadena (Tinashe song) =

2021 single by Tinashe

Single by Tinashe featuring Buddy

from the album 333
- Released: June 4, 2021
- Length: 2:56
- Label: Tinashe Music
- Composers: Tinashe Kachingwe; Oliver Malcolm; Simmie Sims III; Todd Pritchard
- Lyricist: Tinashe Kachingwe
- Producers: Todd Pritchard; Oliver Malcolm

Tinashe singles chronology
"Lean on Me" (2021)	"Pasadena" (2021)	"Bouncin'" (2021)

Music video
- "Pasadena" on YouTube

"Pasadena" is a song by the American singer and songwriter Tinashe. It was released on June 4, 2021, as the lead single of her fifth studio album, 333 (2021). The song features American rapper Buddy. Following earlier releases such as 2020's "Rascal (Superstar)", "Pasadena" was co-written and produced by Oliver Malcolm.

== Background ==
In 2020, Tinashe released her single titled "Rascal (Superstar)", and a holiday EP, Comfort & Joy. In the following year, she returned with "Pasadena", featuring American rapper Buddy, and it served as the lead single from her upcoming studio album. Co-written and produced by Swedish-born, Los Angeles-based artist Oliver Malcolm, the song marks her first release since appearing on Cheat Codes's single "Lean on Me".

== Composition ==
"Pasadena"
"Pasadena" highlights Oliver Malcolm's frenetic, "Hey Ya!"-sampling production.

"Pasadena" is a song driven by "straight vibes", marked by an "early summer energy" suited for "coasting on the road". It also introduces "another Tinashe", one "keen to explore hyper-pop and razor-sharp synths". In the song, Tinashe sings lines such as "Feelin' free, feelin' free, feelin' right" and "Summer's coming round the corner".

== Music video ==
Less than a week after the release of "Pasadena", Tinashe unveiled its accompanying music video, directed by Micaiah Carter. According to Uproxx's Aaron Williams, the music video features a "sun-washed", hillside setting overlooking a wide California landscape. Tinashe and Buddy are shown "heading for the hills", taking over a remote, glass-walled home with sweeping views, while the scenes depict the pair relaxing on the balcony, smoking, and escaping the city. The video also highlights Tinashe's choreography, as she performs with a team of dancers in a routine characterized by its TikTok-ready flair.

== Release history ==
Release dates and formats
Region	Date	Format	Label	Ref.
Various	June 4, 2021	Digital download; streaming	Tinashe Music	
