= Popstar (album) =

- Standard edition cover

Studio album by Tinashe
- Released: September 25, 2026
- Recorded: September 2025 – 2026
- Genres: Pop; R&B
- Length: 39:22
- Labels: Nice Life; Atlantic; Tinashe Music
- Producers: Arca; Machinedrum; Zach Sekoff; Kimj; Ricky Reed; Nightfeelings; Fred Ball; Illangelo; Darhyl Camper; Couros Sheibani; Kingdom; Casey Mattson; Dave Hamelin; Andrew Wells

Tinashe chronology
Quantum Baby (2024)	Popstar (2026)

Singles from Popstar
- 1. "Too Easy" Released: June 5, 2026; 2. "Crash Out" Released: July 16, 2026; 3. "Melatonin" Released: August 13, 2026; 4. "Pillow Fight" Released: September 10, 2026

Popstar is the eighth studio album by American singer Tinashe. It was released on September 25, 2026, through her own imprint label, Tinashe Music, alongside Nice Life Recording Company and Atlantic Records. Described as a pop and R&B album, it was primarily produced by Ricky Reed, Zach Sekoff and Machinedrum. It was preceded by the release of four singles: "Too Easy", "Crash Out", "Melatonin" and "Pillow Fight".

Upon its release, Popstar received widespread acclaim from critics, who highlighted its variety of genre elements, including hyperpop and dance. A bonus edition of the album was released on September 27, 2026, on iTunes, featuring remixes by PinkPantheress, Nick León and Umru.

Commercially, Popstar debuted at number six on the Billboard 200, becoming Tinashe's first top ten album in the United States. The album topped the UK R&B Album Chart, reached the top ten in Australia, and the top 40 in the UK, New Zealand, Scotland, and Belgium, while charting in several other territories including Canada, France, the Netherlands, and Spain. It also became Tinashe's highest-charting album in most of those regions.

== Background ==
Tinashe performing for her Match My Freak Tour

Tinashe released her sixth studio album, BB/Ang3l, through Nice Life Recording Company and her own imprint label, Tinashe Music, as the first part of an intended trilogy in 2023. In 2024, she released the second part, titled Quantum Baby. The album's lead single, "Nasty", became viral on online social media platform TikTok; the song charted at number 61 on the US Billboard Hot 100—her first entry as a solo artist. In June 2025, Tinashe released a Disco Lines remix of the album's third single, "No Broke Boys", which also gained virality on TikTok. The remix reached number 36 on the Hot 100, while peaking atop the US Hot Dance/Electronic Songs chart.

Tinashe had been teasing her new project via social media platforms. In an interview with The Hollywood Reporter at the iHeartRadio Music Awards in March 2026, she revealed that she was "very excited" to share a new album, which she had been working for past six months to year. Tinashe described the project as "cutting-edge, innovative, [...] something new", adding that she loved to blend variety of genres. However, she noted that it was difficult to define them, since she incorporates several genres namely R&B, pop, electronic, and dance music.

Tinashe has stated that the album's title track, "Popstar", was the first song recorded for the album, followed by "Nobody Wanna Dance Anymore".

== Title and packaging ==
The album's title and artwork explore Tinashe's conception of the "pop star" as both a public persona and an identity that can be embodied. Tinashe described Popstar as "an energy" and "a persona one can embody," explaining that the album examines the contrasting experiences associated with celebrity, including the glamour and excitement of public life alongside the surveillance, judgment, and heightened self-awareness that accompany it. The album cover, photographed by Hugo Comte, features an extreme close-up of Tinashe's face with her eyes visible through glasses and stars appearing in her irises. Tinashe said the image was intended to represent the "uncanny valley" of fame and the coexistence of its positive and negative aspects. She also characterized the album's varied musical styles—including pop, R&B, hip-hop, and dance—as different expressions of the same "pop star" identity.

== Promotion ==
Tinashe first teased Popstar's then-upcoming lead single during her DJ set at Coachella in April 2026. On June 5, "Too Easy" was released to digital download platforms. The second single, "Crash Out", was released on July 16, and Tinashe announced the album's release date and cover art that day. Via Nice Life Recording Company and Atlantic Records, Popstar was released on September 25, featuring 16 songs. On August 13, "Melatonin" was released as the third single. On September 10, the fourth single, "Pillow Fight", and promotional single, "I'd Rather Be Alone", were released.

Tinashe revealed the tracklist on her social media platforms on September 17. She appeared on the Call Her Daddy podcast with Alex Cooper on September 23.

On September 28, Tinashe released an iTunes-exclusive bonus edition of Popstar, featuring remixes by PinkPantheress, Nick León and Umru. The album reached number 1 on the iTunes album chart in over forty countries. It became her first album to top the United States iTunes chart since Songs for You in 2019.

=== Three Nights with a Popstar Tour ===
In anticipation of the album, Tinashe announced the Three Nights with a Popstar Tour on July 21, 2026, a three-show run in October and November.

List of 2026 concerts
Date (2026)	City	Country	Venue	Attendance
October 16	Chicago	United States	The Salt Shed	—
October 24	New York City	United States	Brooklyn Paramount	—
November 7	Los Angeles	United States	Hollywood Palladium	—

== Critical reception ==
Professional ratings
Aggregate scores
Source	Rating
AnyDecentMusic?	8.0/10
Metacritic	90/100
Review scores
Source	Rating
AllMusic	4.5/5 stars
Beats Per Minute	75%
Euphoria	4/5 stars
God Is in the TV	9/10
The Line of Best Fit	8/10
MusicOMH	4.5/5 stars
NME	5/5 stars
Paste	B+
Pitchfork	9.0/10
Still Listening	80/100

Popstar received widespread acclaim from music critics. According to Metacritic, it received "universal acclaim" based on a weighted average score of 90 out of 100 from ten critic scores. AnyDecentMusic? gave the album a weighted average score of 8.0 out of 10 from nine critic scores.

In a five-star review for NME, Nicolas-Tyrell Scott states that "Popstar is an equilibrium of confidence and introspection on which Tinashe lets the world in – not to vie for their approval, but to showcase the trials and tribulations of a Black woman in Hollywood. [...] On Popstar, Tinashe doesn't run from the headlights, she realises that she's always been her own one." For Pitchfork, Anna Gaca wrote that the album is Tinashe's "best and bravest yet: more ambitious, more focused, and effortlessly in touch with the zeitgeist. It's the best pop album of the year."

Reflecting on the different genres and musical elements of the album, Kyle Denis for Billboard wrote that "musically, the 16-track set mirrors the artwork's nuanced approach to pop stardom by surveying a jaw-dropping collection of sounds, including hyperpop, R&B, dance, jazz, new age, bedroom pop, and even a little hint of country."

=== Year-end lists ===
Publication	Accolade	Rank	Ref.
Apple Music	Best of 2026; Our Favorite Albums of the Year	-	

== Commercial performance ==
Popstar debuted at number 6 on the Billboard 200, selling 35,500 units in its opening week. Of that sum, 22,000 unites were pure album sales, marking her best sales week and resulting in a number 4 debut on the Top Album Sales chart. The album marked Tinashe's highest first-week sales of her career, her highest charting album (surpassing her debut album Aquarius, which peaked at number 17) and her first top ten album in the United States. In its second week of sales, the album dropped to number 51 on the chart with 17,000 units sold. The album charted for four consecutive weeks on the Billboard 200.

The album debuted and peaked at number 45 on the Canadian Albums Chart, marking her second appearance on the chart since 2018's Joyride. The album fell to number 90 the following week. The album reached number 10 in Australia and stayed on the ARIA Top 50 Albums Chart for three consecutive weeks. The album debuted at number 24 on the New Zealand Albums Chart, peaking at number 22 the following week.

In the United Kingdom, Popstar debuted at number 35 on the UK Albums Chart and topped the R&B Album Chart. It debuted and peaked at number 20 on the Scottish Albums Chart, following to number 70 the following week. In the rest of Europe, the album charted in several regions including Belgium, France, the Netherlands, Portugal and Spain. With the exception of France, it became Tinashe's highest-charting album in all of those regions.

== Track listing ==
Standard track listing
No.	Title	Writer(s)	Producer(s)	Length
1.	"Sunglasses"	Tinashe Kachingwe; Travis Stewart; Alejandra Ghersi Rodriguez	Machinedrum; Arca	2:36
2.	"Too Easy"	Kachingwe; Zack Sekoff; Kimj; Bianca "Blush" Atterberry	Kimj; Sekoff	1:54
3.	"Melatonin"	Kachingwe; Eric Frederic; Sekoff; Nick Weiss	Sekoff; Nightfeelings; Ricky Reed	3:42
4.	"Empty Stadium"	Kachingwe; Fred Ball	Ball	2:45
5.	"Flashbacks"	Kachingwe; Carlo Montagnese; Lewis Donte Shoates; Thulani Kachingwe	Illangelo	2:43
6.	"Overdramatic"	Kachingwe; Darhyl Camper Jr.	Camper	0:44
7.	"I'd Rather Be Alone"	Kachingwe; Frederic; Sekoff	Reed; Sekoff	3:14
8.	"Crash Out"	Kachingwe; Couros; Zikai	Couros	3:10
9.	"Pillow Fight"	Kachingwe; Frederic; Efrat Alony; Mark Reinke	Reed	2:21
10.	"Nobody Wanna Dance Anymore"	Kachingwe; Ezra Rubin; Frederic; Olubowale Akintimehin; Stefani Germanotta; Gary DeCarlo; Dale Frashuer; Paul Leka; Roy Hammond; André Lyon; Makeba Riddick; Kirk Robinson; Marcello Valenzano	Kingdom; Reed	2:20
11.	"Twentyfive Eight"	Kachingwe; Rubin	Kingdom	3:08
12.	"The Show Must Go On"	Kachingwe; Frederic	Reed	0:19
13.	"Popstar"	Kachingwe; Rubin; Frederic	Kingdom; Reed	2:47
14.	"Brainrot"	Kachingwe; Casey Mattson	Mattson	2:22
15.	"Cloud 9"	Kachingwe; Dave Hamelin; Olivia Waithe	Hamelin	2:25
16.	"Heavy Weight"	Kachingwe; Amy Allen; Andrew Wells	Wells	2:53
Total length:				39:21

iTunes Store special edition bonus tracks
No.	Title	Writer(s)	Producer(s)	Length
17.	"Twentyfive Eight" (flip)	Ti. Kachingwe; Rubin; Victoria Walker	Count Baldor; PinkPantheress	2:56
18.	"Brainrot" (Nick León flip)	Ti. Kachingwe; Mattson		3:16
19.	"Popstar" (Umru flip)	Ti. Kachingwe; Frederic; Rubin		3:35
20.	"Too Easy" (extended version)	Ti. Kachingwe; Atterberry; Sekoff; Kimj	Sekoff; Kimj	3:20
Total length:				55:40

=== Notes ===
- "Nobody Wanna Dance Anymore" contains an interpolation of "Chillin" (2009), written by Olubowale Akintimehin, Gary De Carlo, Dale Frashuer, Stefani Germanotta, Roy C Hammond, Paul Leka, Andre Christopher Lyon, Makeba Riddick, Kirk Robinson, Marcello Valenzano and performed by Wale featuring Lady Gaga.
- Three additional iTunes Store digital editions of the album were released: one featuring a cappella versions of all tracks, one featuring instrumental versions, and one featuring the music videos for "Too Easy", "Crash Out", "Melatonin" and "Pillow Fight".

== Personnel ==
The credits were adapted from Tidal.

=== Musicians ===
- Tinashe – vocals
- Ricky Reed – bass synthesizer (tracks 3, 7, 9-10), drum programming (3, 7, 10, 13), programming (3, 9), electric guitar (7), synthesizer (7, 10, 13), drums (9), vocoder (10)
- Nick Weiss – synthesizer programming (3)
- Illangelo – drums, programming, synthesizer (5)
- Annetta Johnson – trumpet (6)
- Zack Sekoff – drum programming, synthesizer programming (3, 7), synthesizer (7)
- Couros – drums programming (8)
- Kingdom – bass synthesizer, drum programming (10-11, 13), synthesizer (13)
- Casey Mattson – keyboards, programming (14)

=== Production ===
- Tinashe – executive production, vocal production (1-15)
- Ricky Reed – executive production, additional production (15), vocal production (3, 7, 9-10, 12-13)
- Ike Schultz – vocal production (1-10, 12-15)
- Nick Weiss – vocal production (3)

=== Technical ===
- Chris Gehringer – mastering
- Tom Norris – mixing
- Ike Schultz – engineering (1-3, 5-6, 8-9), vocal engineering (1-6, 8-9, 11, 14-15)
- Ethan Shumaker – engineering (3, 7, 9-10, 12-13)
- Shane Moloney – engineering (3, 7, 9-10, 12-13)
- Victor Verpillat – engineering (8), mixing assistance (1-7, 9-16)
- Andrew Wells – engineering (16)
- Claude Vause – engineering (16)
- Tinashe – vocal engineering (1-6)

== Charts ==
Chart performance
Chart (2026)	Peak position
Australian Albums (ARIA)	10
Belgian Albums (Ultratop Flanders)	36
Belgian Albums (Ultratop Wallonia)	64
Canadian Albums (Billboard)	45
Croatian International Albums (HDU)	20
Dutch Albums (Album Top 100)	76
French Physical Albums (SNEP)	88
Hungarian Physical Albums (MAHASZ)	23
Japanese Dance & Soul Albums (Oricon)	6
New Zealand Albums (RMNZ)	22
Portuguese Albums (AFP)	59
Scottish Albums (Official Charts)	20
Spanish Albums (Promusicae)	59
Swiss Albums (Schweizer Hitparade)	66
UK Albums (Official Charts)	35
UK R&B Albums (Official Charts)	1
US Billboard 200	6

== Release history ==
List of release dates and formats
Region	Date	Format(s)	Edition	Label	Ref.
Various	September 25, 2026	Compact disc; download; streaming; vinyl LP	Standard	Nice Life; Atlantic; Tinashe Music	
Various	September 27, 2026	Download	Bonus	Nice Life; Atlantic; Tinashe Music	
