= Lean on Me (Cheat Codes song) =

Single by Cheat Codes featuring Tinashe

from the album Hellraisers, Pt. 1
- Released: May 6, 2021
- Genre: Pop
- Length: 2:29
- Label: Cheat Codes; 300
- Songwriters: Ivy Adara; Ryan Ogren; Adam Halliday; B HAM; Tinashe; Trevor Dahl
- Producers: Ryan Ogren; Prince Fox; Trevor Dahl; B HAM

Cheat Codes singles chronology
"That Feeling" (2021)	"Lean on Me" (2021)	"Never Love You Again" (2021)

Tinashe singles chronology
"Love Line" (2021)	"Lean on Me" (2021)	"Pasadena" (2021)

Music video
- "Lean on Me" on YouTube

"Lean on Me" is a song by American DJ trio Cheat Codes featuring American singer Tinashe. It was released on May 6, 2021, as the ninth single from their debut studio album Hellraisers, Pt. 1. It was written by Ivy Adara, Adam Halliday, Tinashe, B HAM, Trevor Dahl and Ryan Ogren, who also produced with the last three and Prince Fox.

== Background ==
Tinashe told Elite Daily: “This song is really on brand with everything we're going through, I think that's probably why I connected with it so much. I think we've all been through quite the year and we've all had ups and downs. It's really rewarding to see the type of people who have come through for us and have been there for us. It's all about friendship and love, and those types of relationships that have really kept us all going."

"Lean on Me" is a song for fans who have felt isolated amid the COVID-19 pandemic, and talks about the importance of friendship.

== Music video ==
The music video was released on May 26, 2021. The video tells a story about overcoming difficult times with the help of others.

== Track listing ==
Digital download
No.	Title	Length
1.	"Lean on Me"	2:29

Digital download (remix)
No.	Title	Length
1.	"Lean on Me (Michael Calfan remix)"	2:09

== Charts ==
=== Weekly charts ===
Weekly chartperformance for "Lean on Me"
Chart (2021)	Peak position
New Zealand Hot Singles (RMNZ)	30
US Hot Dance/Electronic Songs (Billboard)	12
US Pop Airplay (Billboard)	30

=== Year-end charts ===
Year-end chart performance for "Lean on Me"
Chart (2021)	Position
US Hot Dance/Electronic Songs (Billboard)	58

== Release history ==
Region	Date	Format	Label	Ref.
Various	May 6, 2021	Digital download	Cheat Codes LLC	
United States	May 18, 2021	Contemporary hit radio	Cheat Codes LLC	
