= Light the Night Up =

Promotional single by Tinashe
- Released: September 28, 2017
- Genre: Electro-dance
- Length: 3:01
- Label: RCA
- Songwriters: Helmut VonLichten; Hitmaka
- Producers: VonLichten; Kitmak

"Light the Night Up" is a song by American singer-songwriter Tinashe. It was written by Helmut VonLichten and Hitmaka, with production handled by VonLichten and Kitmak. The song was released on September 28, 2017, as the theme song for CBS SPORTS' Thursday Night Football broadcast.

== Critical reception ==
Chris Malone Méndez of Billboard deemed the song "an amalgamation of the different sounds that the singer has mastered so farover her career", including "the slinky R&B feel of her mixtapes and last year's EP Nightride, the poppy dance mood that characterized Joyride Japanese Version singles "Player" and "Superlove," as well as an unfamiliar EDM-leaning sound that feels like it belongs in an Ultra Music Festival set rather than a Tinashe song". Bianca Garwood of Ebony regarded it as an "upbeat track" and an "electrodance tune". Tom Breihan of Stereogum called it "a gleaming club track that sound much more like '90s Euro-techno than it probably should". Kevin Goddard of HotNewHipHop described it as "a celebratory song" and "a feel-good party anthem" that is "highlighted by its EDM-infused production and Tinashe's vocals". Mike Wass of Idolator called it "a sugary, disco-tinged banger".

== Credits and personnel ==
Credits adapted from Tidal.

- Helmut VonLichten – songwriting, production, mixing engineering, recording engineering
- Yung Berg – songwriting
- Kitmak – production
- Jorge Velasco – mastering engineering
