= Melatonin (song) =

Single by Tinashe

from the album Popstar
- Released: August 13, 2026
- Genre: Dance-pop; techno; hyperpop
- Length: 3:42
- Label: Tinashe Music; Nice Life; Atlantic
- Songwriters: Tinashe Kachingwe; Nightfeelings; Zack Sekoff; Alec King; Ricky Reed
- Producers: Nightfeelings; Zack Sekoff; Ricky Reed

Tinashe singles chronology
"Crash Out" (2026)	"Melatonin" (2026)	"Pillow Fight" (2026)

Music video
- "Melatonin" on YouTube

"Melatonin" is a song by American singer Tinashe, from her eighth studio album, Popstar (2026). It was released on August 13, 2026, through Tinashe Music, Nice Life Recording Company, and Atlantic Records, as the third single from the album. The song was nominated for Best Dance/Electronic Recording at the 2027 Grammy Awards.

== Background and composition ==
Ahead of the release of her upcoming eighth studio album, Popstar (2026), Tinashe released the singles "Too Easy" and "Crash Out" in the beginning of the summer. "Melatonin" was released as the album's third single on August 14, 2026. The song was written by Tinashe alongside Eric Frederic, Nick Weiss, Alec King, and Zack Sekoff, with production handled by Sekoff (synthesizer and drums programming), Nightfeelings (synthesizer), and Ricky Reed (bass synthesizer and drums programming).

"Melatonin" is a dance-pop, techno, and hyperpop track. It was described by Alexander Cole of HotNewHipHop as an "electronic and pop crossover", featuring Tinashe's "catchy songwriting", and was considered another example of the artist's continued reinvention. According to Stereoboard's Jon Stickler, the song embraces the artist's "dark, clubby edge".

== Music video ==
The accompanying music video was released on August 13, 2026. Directed by 91 Rules, it features Tinashe performing and "jamming" to the song in a series of changing outfits, with scenes also showing her alongside a group of partygoers.

== Critical reception ==
Stereogum writer Tom Breihan described "Melatonin" as an "all-out dancefloor blitz" and a "borderline experimental techno rager", comparing it to the work of British artist Shygirl. Despite the implication of its title, the song was not considered "relaxing"; rather, it was interpreted as encouraging the listener to stop being "melatonin". For Euphoria magazine, Nikos Aggelis Anthis wrote that "with this third single from her upcoming album Popstar, Tinashe once again reminds us why she is considered one of the most exciting and unpredictable figures in contemporary pop and R&B." For Billboard, Kyle Denis wrote that Tinashe might have another hit on her hands as "the 16-track set [Popstar] features several buzzy singles, but the dance-pop banger “Melatonin” is posting the most notable gains."

In their review of Popstar, The Line of Best Fit named "Melatonin" the magnum opus of the album. Jonathan Wright from God Is in the TV named "Melatonin" a single of the year contender, arguing that "it’s brimming with excellent production details (deep house bass stabs, SOPHIE-esque synths, clattering percussion) that shows Tinashe isn’t messing around. [...] It’s music that people will still be talking about as sounding like the future decades on."

== Accolades ==
Awards and nominations for "Melatonin"
Award	Year	Category	Result	Ref.
Grammy Awards	2027	Best Dance/Electronic Recording	Pending	

== Live performances and other appearances ==
Tinashe performed "Melatonin" live for the first time during Charli XCX's set at Austin City Limits Festival on October 9, 2026. Later that month, she performed the song during her shows for the Three Nights With A Popstar mini-tour.

On November 10, 2026, Tinashe performed "Melatonin" for the first time on national television on The Tonight Show Starring Jimmy Fallon, in a medley with "Popstar".

== Charts ==
Chart performance
Chart (2026)	Peak position
New Zealand Hot Singles (RMNZ)	20
US Hot Dance/Pop Songs (Billboard)	9
