= Comfort & Joy (EP) =

EP by Tinashe
- Released: November 25, 2020
- Length: 18:25
- Label: Tinashe Music
- Producers: Tinashe; Quiet Child

Tinashe chronology
Songs for You (2019)	Comfort & Joy (2020)	333 (2021)

Comfort & Joy is an extended play and the first Christmas themed record by American singer Tinashe. It was released independently through her own label Tinashe Music Inc. on November 25, 2020. The EP consists of seven tracks including an introductory piece, all of which are reinterpretations of traditional Christmas carols. Tinashe co-produced the record with her younger brother, Quiet Child.

Comfort & Joy incorporates elements of contemporary R&B and trap-pop. It also features arrangements such as a piano-based rendition of Nat King Cole's "The Christmas Song", a trap-pop–influenced version of "God Rest Ye Merry Gentlemen", a reinterpretation of Wham!'s "Last Christmas", and a version of "O Holy Night" with an electric guitar solo. The cover artwork depicts Tinashe smiling against a red backdrop with matching lipstick and gloves.

== Background and release ==
Following her departure from RCA Records after what she described as a restrictive contract period, Tinashe began releasing music independently, starting with her 2019 album Songs for You. She then announced the EP on her social media accounts, referring to it as "a cute lil Christmas EP" and stating that she felt listeners "could use some comfort and joy this year". On November 25, 2020, she released the EP on streaming services.

Tinashe performed "O Holy Night" on Good Morning America on December 25, 2020.

== Composition ==
Comfort & Joy consists of seven tracks and an introductory piece, featureing reinterpretations of traditional Christmas carols and no original compositions. The EP was co-produced by Tinashe with her younger brother, Quiet Child. According to Rated R&B, the project incorporates contemporary R&B and trap-pop production elements. It also includes a reinterpretation of Wham!'s "Last Christmas" and a piano-based arrangement of Nat King Cole's "The Christmas Song", which features processed vocal effects and background crowd-noise elements. Additionally, Comfort & Joy contains Tinashe's version of "O Holy Night", arranged with an electric guitar solo. Her recording of "God Rest Ye Merry Gentlemen" presents a trap-pop–influenced production approach.

=== Artwork ===
The cover artwork features Tinashe set against a red background, wearing red lipstick and matching gloves. The image depicts her smiling, which she noted on social media as her first cover to do so. Fellow artist Kehlani publicly commented on the artwork, describing it as "beautiful".

== Critical reception ==
Euphoria noted that while the fusion of R&B and Christmas music has been explored by artists such as Mariah Carey, Destiny's Child, and Smino, Comfort & Joy represents a polished addition to the tradition and a suitable fit for non-traditional holiday playlists. Writing for The New York Times, Jon Pareles noted that "Tinashe ricochets off the familiar material, adding verbal responses or surreally warping arrangements, using synthetic rhythms and her gravity-defying voice to change and challenge expectations."

== Track listing ==
All tracks are written by Tinashe.

Comfort & Joy track listing
No.	Title	Length
1.	"Comfort & Joy" (Intro)	0:15
2.	"God Rest Ye Merry Gentlmen"	2:45
3.	"Angels We Have Heard on High"	2:25
4.	"Last Christmas"	3:32
5.	"The Christmas Song"	2:59
6.	"O Holy Night"	3:48
7.	"Have Yourself a Merry Little Christmas"	2:41
Total length:		18:25

== Release history ==
Release dates and formats
Region	Date	Format(s)	Label	Ref.
Various	November 25, 2020	Digital download; streaming	Tinashe Music	
