= Rascal (Superstar) =

2020 single by Tinashe

Single by Tinashe
- Released: July 17, 2020
- Recorded: 2018
- Genre: Pop; R&B
- Length: 2:40
- Label: Tinashe Music
- Songwriters: Tinashe Kachingwe; Kudzai Kachingwe; Alex King
- Producer: Sage the Gemini

Tinashe singles chronology
"Save Room for Us" (2020)	"Rascal (Superstar)" (2020)	"Dance Like Nobody's Watching" (2020)

Music video
- "Rascal (Superstar)" on YouTube

"Rascal (Superstar)" is a song by American singer Tinashe. It was released on July 17, 2020. The song was written by Tinashe and her brother, Kudzai Kachingwe, alongside co-writer Alex King, and was produced by Sage the Gemini.

== Background ==
The song was conceived during Tinashe's Songs for You era. The song was first previewed on Instagram live several months prior to release.

"The vibes and energy were so infectious that It felt right to share, spontaneously. Since that day, my fans have been asking me to release the record nonstop! In the spirit of Songs For You I knew I had to drop it for my fans. Thanks to Sage the Gemini for producing – we are on some West Coast braggadocios vibes that, frankly, we all deserve."

Tinashe released a string of remixes from her previous studio album Songs for You, including "Hopscotch", "Die a Little Bit", "Touch & Go", and "Save Room For Us".

== Composition and lyrics ==
"Rascal" (Superstar)" is a bouncy, "groovy, darker" track.

== Critical reception ==
Meredith Kile for Kare11 praised the songs sonic qualities, calling it "an expensive-sounding track". Brooklyn Vegan's Andrew Sacher called "Rascal" overall "a great dose of air, moody R&B".

Criticism drew from the song's lyrical content in context of the time of its release of the COVID-19 pandemic. As Joan Summers from Jezebel put it, the lyrics "[are] a perfectly fine sentiment, I guess, if we weren't currently living through these modern times".

== Music video ==
The music video for the song accompanied its release the same day as the song, premiering on Tinashe's YouTube channel. It was directed by Jasper Soloff. The only feature in the music video is a Phantom 4 Pro drone.

=== Synopsis ===
The music video follows a socialite trapped in her home while live streaming to her fans.

== Charts ==
Chart (2020)	Peak position
US R&B Digital Song Sales (Billboard)	10

== Release history ==
Country	Date	Format	Label
Various	July 17, 2020	Digital download; streaming	Tinashe Music via Equity Distribution and Roc Nation
