= Ms Banks =

Nigerian-British rapper (born 1994)

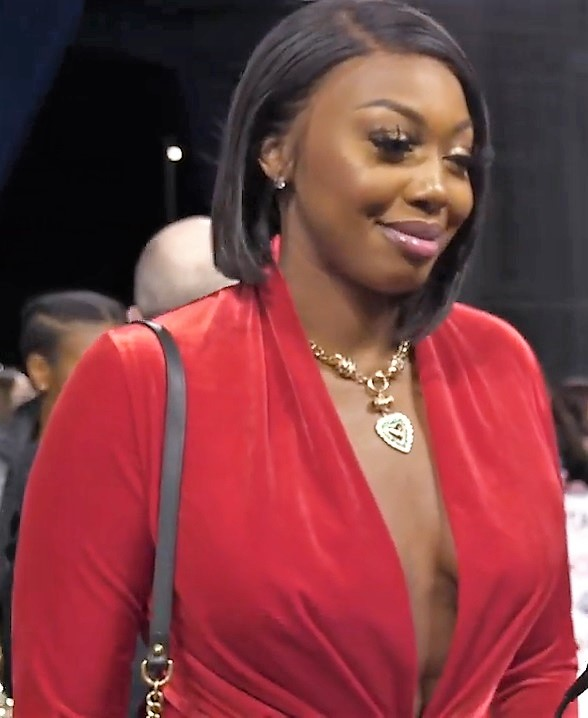
- Banks in 2020

Background information
- Born: Thyra Ebony Kigho Deshaun Oji; 13 April 1994 (age 32); London, England
- Origin: Camberwell, London, England
- Genres: Hip-hop, R&B, afrobeats
- Occupations: Rapper; singer; songwriter
- Years active: 2011–present

Thyra Kigho Deshaun Oji (born 13 April 1994), better known by her stage name Ms Banks, is a Nigerian and British rapper, singer and songwriter. Oji has released three mixtapes as Ms Banks. In 2014, she released her first mixtape titled Once Upon a Grind. She then released her first EP titled New Chapter EP in 2016. The Coldest Winter Ever was released in 2018, followed by The Coldest Winter Ever Part II in 2019. In 2023 she appeared alongside Ukraine's Kalush Orchestra as part of the opening act for the Eurovision Song Contest 2023 hosted in Liverpool.

== Early life ==
She was born to a Nigerian father and a Ugandan mother. Oji began writing music at age 11 and she came from very musical family. Banks grew up in South London – just off Walworth Road in Elephant and Castle – and has been grafting away for sometime, revered by her peers for her pairing of technical skill with soul-searching lyricism.

== Influences ==
Ms Banks has cited Nicki Minaj as her biggest influence. She also cites Ms Dynamite, Estelle, Lauryn Hill, Lil’ Kim, Foxy Brown and Beyonce as her influences.

== Discography ==
=== Mixtapes ===
Title	Mixtape details
Once Upon a Grind	Released: 2014; Format: Digital download, streaming; Label: Self-released
The Coldest Winter Ever	Released: 27 April 2018; Format: Digital download, streaming; Label: Self-released
The Coldest Winter Ever, Pt. 2	Released: 12 December 2019; Format: Digital download, streaming; Label: Self-released
Bank Statement	Released: 22 July 2022; Format: Digital download, streaming; Label: Self-released
South LDN Lover Girl	Released: 13 March 2026; Format: Digital download, streaming; Label: Believe

=== EPs ===
Title	EP details
New Chapter	Released: 2016; Format: Digital download, streaming; Label: Self-released

=== Singles ===
==== As lead artist ====
Song	Year	Album
"Get Loose"	2017	Non-album singles
"Omg"	2017	Non-album singles
"Vibez"	2017	Non-album singles
"R.I.P." (featuring Loski)	2018	The Coldest Winter Ever
"Remember the Name"	2019	Non-album single
"Hood B*tch"	2019	The Coldest Winter Ever, Pt. 2
"Snack" (featuring Kida Kudz)	2019	The Coldest Winter Ever, Pt. 2
"Back It Up" (featuring Geko)	2019	The Coldest Winter Ever, Pt. 2
"Bad B Bop"	2019	The Coldest Winter Ever, Pt. 2
"Still The Best" (with Flyo)	2020	Supafly Strikes Again
"Anywhere" (with Naira Marley)	2020	Non-album singles
"Novikov"	2020	Non-album singles
"Nothin' on Me" (featuring Phil Speiser and Wow Jones)	2020	Non-album singles
"You Don't Know"	2020	Non-album singles
"Pull Up" (featuring K-Trap)	2021	Non-album singles
"Dip" (with Stefflon Don)	2021	Non-album singles
"Go Low"	2021	Non-album singles
"Party" (with Naira Marley)	2021	Bank Statement
"Typa Way" (with Tion Wayne featuring Eight9Fly)	2022	Bank Statement
"Bounce"	2022	Bank Statement
"Gbedu" (with Kwesi Arthur, Snypa and Joey B)	2022	Non-album singles
"Daily Duppy"	2023	Non-album singles

=== As featured artist ===
Title	Year	Album
"Been the Man" (Tinie Tempah, Jme, Stormzy featuring Ms Banks)	2015	Junk Food
"Champion (Main Mix)" (Juan Magán and Stylo G featuring Ms Banks)	2018	Non-album singles
"Heartbreaker" (Laura White featuring Ms Banks)	2018	Non-album singles
"Fleek Bop" (Remix) (MelaTwins featuring Ms Banks)	2018	Non-album singles
"Wondering" (Remix) (M.O and Geko featuring Ms Banks)	2018	Non-album singles
"Like Tu Danz" (Juls, Kida Kudz, Pa Salieu featuring Ms Banks)	2019	Colour
"Woman Like Me" (Little Mix featuring Ms Banks)	2019	LM5 - EP
"Drama" (Mae Muller, Caitlyn Scarlett featuring Ms Banks)	2019	Non-album singles
"Gangsta" (Remix) (DARKOO, Br3nya featuring Ms Banks)	2019	Non-album singles
"Die a Little Bit" (Tinashe featuring Ms Banks)	2019	Songs for You
"Issues" (Nana Rogues featuring Ms Banks)	2020	Non-album singles
"Interest" (Dolapo, Oxlade featuring Ms Banks)	2021	Non-album singles
"Woi Oi" (Geko, BackRoad Gee featuring Ms Banks)	2021	Non-album singles
"Die a Little Bit" (KDA Remix) (KDA, Tinashe, Karnage Kills featuring Ms Banks)	2021	Non-album singles

== Tours ==
Supporting

- Hot Girl Summer Tour (for Megan Thee Stallion) (2024)
