= Songs for You =

Studio album by Tinashe
- Released: November 21, 2019
- Studio: Tinashe's home studio (Los Angeles)
- Length: 52:50
- Label: Tinashe Music
- Producers: BongoByTheWay; Boston; Darion Javon; Go Grizzly; Hit-Boy; Hitmaka; Kingdom; Killah B; MAKJ; Myles Morgan; Oliver Malcolm; Oz; Poo Beatz; Connor McDonough; Smash David; Styalz Fuego; Todd Prichard; Trackside; Turn Me Up Josh; Wax Motif

Tinashe chronology
Joyride (2018)	Songs for You (2019)	Comfort & Joy (2020)

Singles from Songs for You
- 1. "Die a Little Bit" Released: October 24, 2019; 2. "Touch & Go" Released: November 7, 2019; 3. "Save Room for Us" Released: February 14, 2020

Songs for You is the fourth studio album by American singer Tinashe. It was released independently through her own label, Tinashe Music Inc., on November 21, 2019. The album is her first release following her departure from RCA Records earlier that year and her signing a management deal with Roc Nation. Songs for You incorporates a variety of musical styles such as R&B, G-funk, 1980s pop, acoustic arrangements, drum-and-bass, and trap-influenced production. It highlights Tinashe's versatility and light soprano vocals.

Songs for You features previously unreleased material from her shelved 2018 project Nashe, alongside new songs written and recorded in her Los Angeles home studio. The album was promoted through singles including "Die a Little Bit", "Touch & Go", and "Save Room for Us", as well as accompanying music videos, listening parties, and a North American tour. The album received positive reviews from music critics, who praised Tinashe's creative autonomy, cohesion, and range across styles. Commercially, Songs for You reached number 147 on the US Billboard 200 and peaked at number 20 on the US Top R&B Albums chart.

== Background and recording ==
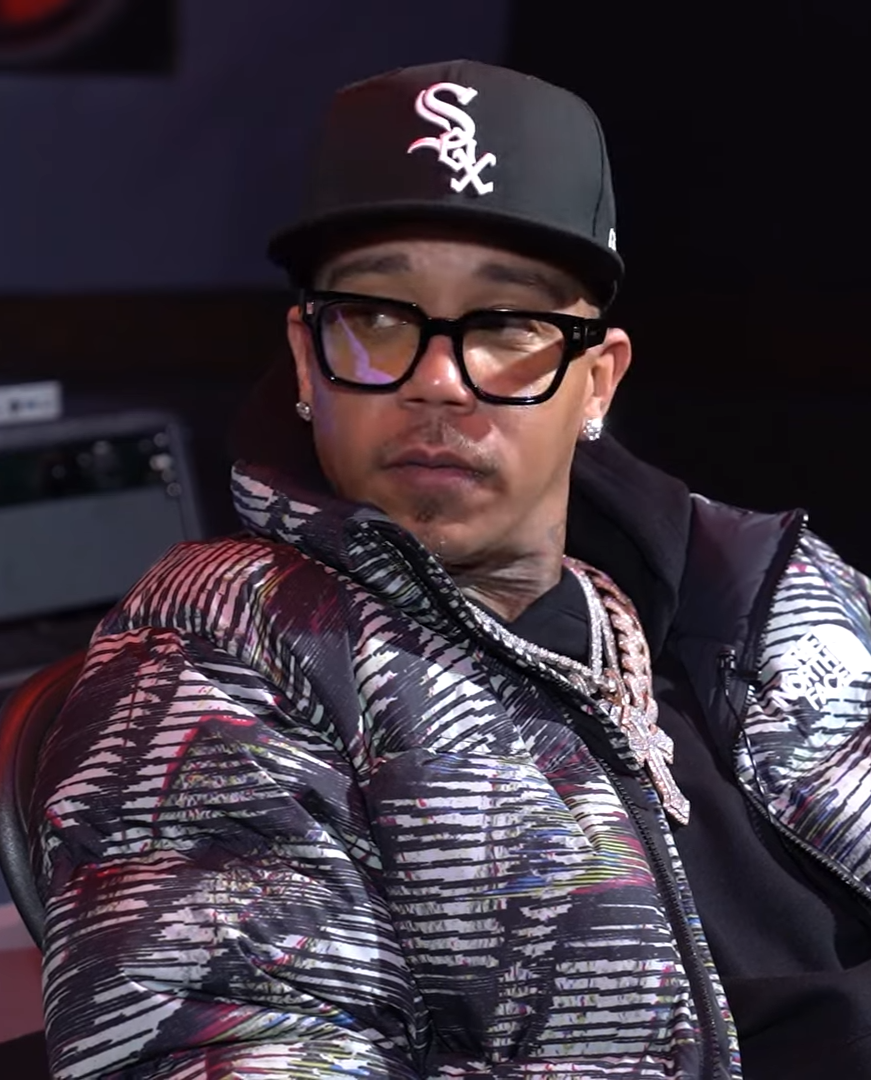
American producer Hitmaka was an executive producer of Tinashe's upcoming mixtape, Nashe.

After Tinashe's previous album, Joyride (2018), she started to tease her follow-up mixtape. The mixtape was based on Tinashe's alter-ego, Nashe. Tinashe promoted Nashe through snippets of songs from the tracklist with Hitmaka, an executive producer on the mixtape. Further promotion continued with its singles, "Like I Used To" and "Throw a Fit", both of which used the mixtape's artwork. However, promotion for Nashe was ceased for unknown reasons. Speculation arose after Tinashe posted a screenshot on Instagram of a page error from RCA's website with a broken heart as the caption to the post. According to Hitmaka, the mixtape was shelved. Nashe was ultimately scrapped, and it was described as a "failed course-correction" by Paper, becoming a turning point in her decision to depart from RCA, among other reasons. Tinashe later cited "creative differences" as a significant factor in her dissatisfaction with the label, stating that these tensions began to affect her overall experience and the material she was able to release. In February 2019, Tinashe's then-manager Mike Nazzaro announced her departure from RCA, citing: "We initiated for her to be released. It was a positive split for her. It's giving her back creative control." Tinashe would eventually sign a management deal with Roc Nation on November 7, 2019.

Between October and November 2019, she held listening parties for her project in London. In an interview with Hip Hop Mike, she stated that Songs for You is her "most vulnerable project to date" and her direction for the album is "a real experience that they could really sink their teeth into. There are a few moments that are in your feels. I had to really open myself up. It's the most vulnerable project I've ever put out." MadeinTYO was originally featured on the tracklist after it was teased throughout the listening parties, but the collaboration was scrapped after the producer gave the beat to another artist.

Songs for You was recorded in Tinashe's home studio in Los Angeles. She described the choice of location as a way of "bringing people into my experience, my world", as she noted that it set the tone for a project that felt "real" and "raw", driven primarily by her emotions. During the sessions, Tinashe frequently collaborated with musicians in an informal, improvisational environment; she recalled moments such as her drummer creating a percussive rhythm by drumming on a table, which was recorded on an iPhone and incorporated directly into the track. She characterized the overall process as experimental and playful and emphasized the creative freedom that defined the album's development.

== Composition ==
Songs for You incorporates an R&B, G-funk influences, 1980s pop elements, acoustic arrangements, drum-and-bass rhythms, and trap-oriented productions. The album moves between these styles—at times within a single track—while maintaining Tinashe's characteristic light, soprano vocal delivery. It also features three songs, "Link Up", "Feelings", and "Cash Race", originally intended for Tinashe's 2018 summer project Nashe, produced by Hitmaka.

The album opens with "Feelings", a track in which Tinashe delivers rap-sung vocals over hard-hitting production. "Life's Too Short" is a song built on a spacious Kingdom-produced beat, highlighted for aligning with the singer's strengths on more experimental productions. "Hopscotch" features Tinashe rapping over her own vocals. "Stormy Weather", a song driven by psychedelic-leaning synths, is notable for its conversational delivery. "Save Room for Us" is a pop-leaning funk track with four-on-the-floor production. "Story of Us", a crisp-funk and Quiet storm–styled song, compared in the review to work from Janet Jackson's The Velvet Rope era. While "Die a Little Bit" is a UK garage-inflected track that adopts a more riskier approach compared to the singles from Joyride, "Perfect Crime" is a smooth, synth-laden pop track. A buoyant, radio-leaning track "Cash Race", was described as a summery anthem in which she references making "back-to-back hits". "Link Up" is a "swanky" and "bouncing trap-hop" song. "Touch & Go", a duet with 6lack, was noted for melancholic tone within the tracklist. A pop R&B song, "Know Better" is described as an after-party groove and a subdued, late-night disco track. "So Much Better" is a R&B track featuring G-Eazy, beginning as an uptempo, hook-oriented collaboration before shifting into a stripped-down section with guitar and vocals. The closing track, "Remember When" is an acoustic ballad.

== Release and promotion ==
In October 2019, Tinashe announced Songs for You along with a trailer on YouTube. "Die a Little Bit", featuring Ms Banks, was released as the lead single from the album on October 24, with an accompanying music video directed by C Prinz. On November 14, she announced the album's cover artwork and its release date. The second single, "Touch & Go" featuring 6lack, was released on November 7. The album was released on Thursday, November 21, instead of the music industry's customary releases of Friday; Tinashe stated in an interview with Billboard that she wanted to emphasize her stance in the music industry as "not part of the system". The music video for "So Much Better" (featuring G-Eazy), directed by Mynxii White, premiered on November 22. "Stormy Weather"'s music video was premiered on December 27.

"Save Room for Us" followed on February 14, 2020, serving as the third single. It was released along with the release of an accompanying video, and an additional remix by Makj himself. An acoustic video for the album's track, "Remember When", was released on April 21. From June 26 to July 10, a remix of a song from the album would be released each Friday; "Hopscotch" with American R&B duo They, "Die a Little Bit" featuring Ms Banks with producer Zhu and "Touch & Go" featuring 6lack with producer Tarro. All remixes came with their own accompanied short visual.

In February 2020, Tinashe announced the tour, titled Tour for You. The tour was set to begin on April 20 at Detroit at Saint Andrews Hall, and it included performances in major North American cities such as Chicago, Pittsburgh, Boston, Philadelphia, New York, Toronto, and concluded in Seattle. Even though multiple shows across the United States and Canada sold out within the first few hours of ticket release, the tour was ultimately cancelled in May 2020 due to the COVID-19 pandemic. In a statement posted to social media, Tinashe confirmed the cancellation and assured fans that refunds would be issued at the point of purchase.

== Reception ==
=== Critical response ===
Professional ratings
Aggregate scores
Source	Rating
Metacritic	75/100
Review scores
Source	Rating
HotNewHipHop	81%
The Line of Best Fit	8/10
NME	3/5 stars
Paste	7.9/10
Pitchfork	7.7/10
Rolling Stone	3.5/5 stars

Songs for You received positive reviews from music critics. According to the review aggregator Metacritic, Songs for You received "generally favorable reviews" based on a weighted average score of 75 out of 100 from 5 critic scores.

Several reviewers focused on Songs for You as a statement of Tinashe's creative freedom following her departure from RCA. Joshua Bote of Paste praised the album as a clear affirmation of Tinashe's renewed independence, noting that it serves as "a testament to her intentionally preserving her autonomy and talent" and succeeding entirely on her own terms. Madeline Roth of MTV News noted lauded the album represents Tinashe exercising full creative control for the first time following her departure from RCA and her new management deal with Roc Nation. She highlighted that it allowed the singer to craft music directly reflecting her personal artistic vision, with Tinashe herself describing the album's creative process as particularly revealing and emotionally impactful. Stereogum's Chris DeVille regarded Songs for You as sonically "[feeling] like freedom. Liberated from label meddling, she has assembled a fine reminder of what made her so likeable in the first place", and compared the overall sound for the album as "the vibe is that of an extremely talented R&B artist getting back to cooking after a deep, cleansing exhale." Chris Taylor of The Line of Best Fit described the album as a "re-debut" that marks a creative reset, praising its sense of freedom. He noted that it represents the kind of project Tinashe had long wanted to make, ultimately calling it a triumphant return that reaffirms her artistic resilience.

Other critics commented on the album's sonic execution and stylistic balance. Eric Torres from Pitchfork praised the record as a confident return to form and noted that its blend of moody R&B, dance-pop, and trap elements feels markedly more effortless than her previous major-label work. He concluded that, despite the years of industry setbacks preceding it, Songs for You represents an artist who has finally found her equilibrium. Nylon's Allison Stubblebine praised the album for its consistency and versatility, noting that "there's not a single bad song on the record". The author concluded that the album serves as clear evidence of Tinashe's "serious range", emphasizing her ability to navigate multiple styles without compromising cohesion. However, NME noted that its rapid shifts between genres make it feel "unfocused", suggesting that its stylistic jumps—from R&B to rap to pop and EDM—can create a disjointed listening experience.

=== Commercial performance ===
Songs for You reached number 1 in the iTunes Albums chart on the night of its release. The album peaked number 147 on Billboard 200, reaching number 21 and 20 on US Independent Albums and US Top R&B Albums chart, respectively.

=== Year-end lists ===
List of year-end lists
Publication	Accolade	Rank	Ref.
Complex	The Best Albums of 2019	45	
The Fader	The 100 Best Songs of 2020 ("Save Room for Us")	43	
HipHopDX	The Best R&B Albums Of 2019	6	
Paste	Best Pop Albums of 2019	14	
Rated R&B	The 30 Best R&B Albums of 2019	23	
Revolt	Top R&B Projects of 2019	5	
Tracklist	15 Best International Albums of 2019	13	

== Track listing ==
Songs for You track listing
No.	Title	Writer(s)	Producer(s)	Length
1.	"Feelings"	Tinashe; London Jae; Landstrip Chip	Hitmaka; Hit-Boy; Smash David	3:06
2.	"Life's Too Short"	Tinashe	Kingdom	3:11
3.	"Hopscotch"	Tinashe; Alec King	Boston; Killah B	3:11
4.	"Stormy Weather"	Tinashe	Oliver Malcolm; Todd Pritchard	3:10
5.	"Save Room for Us"	Tinashe; Max Levin; Mackenzie Johnson; Riley McDonough	MAKJ; Connor McDonough	2:45
6.	"Story of Us"	Tinashe; DeLaney Harter	Oz	2:45
7.	"Die a Little Bit" (featuring Ms Banks)	Tinashe; Parrish Warrington; Thyra Oji; Rook Monroe; Vaughn Elsas	Trackside	2:45
8.	"Perfect Crime"	Tinashe; Thulani Kachingwe; Kudzai Kachingwe; Kaelyn Behr	Styalz Fuego; Wax Motif	2:56
9.	"Cash Race"	Tinashe; Go Grizzly; London Jae; Tariq Beats; Turn Me Up Josh; Pooh Beatz; Landstrip Chip; Mayila; Lorenzo Chatmon; Timothy Michael Wells, Jr.; Quinton Lamar Cook	Hitmaka; Go Grizzly; Poo Beatz; Turn Me Up Josh	4:34
10.	"Link Up"	Tinashe; Hitmaka; Chrishan; London Jae; Smash David; Landstrip Chip	Smash David; Hitmaka	3:28
11.	"Touch & Go" (featuring 6lack)	Tinashe; Dimitri McDowell; Elliott Trent; Lisa Scinta; DeLaney Harter; Ricardo Valentine	Killah B	4:15
12.	"Know Better"	Tinashe; Gabrielle Nowee	Killah B; Bongo	6:57
13.	"You (Interlude)"	Tinashe	Tinashe	0:06
14.	"So Much Better" (featuring G-Eazy)	Tinashe; Gerald Gillum	Myles Morgan; Malcolm; Pritchard	4:50
15.	"Remember When"	Tinashe	Darion Jovan	3:50
Total length:				52:50

=== Notes ===
- "Hopscotch" contains a hidden track called "Like Me" starting at 1:53.
- "Cash Race" contains a hidden track called "All Eyes on Me" starting at 1:38.
- "Link Up" contains a hidden track called "Naked" starting at 2:08.
- "Know Better" contains a hidden track called "Did You Notice?" starting at 2:53.
- "So Much Better" contains a hidden track called "Soul Food" starting at 2:50 and resung lyrics from "Midnight Sun", written by Tinashe, Craig Balmoris and Julian Nixon.

== Personnel ==
Credits were adapted from AllMusic.

- Ike Schultz – engineer, mixing, vocal producer
- Tinashe – executive producer, producer

== Charts ==
Weekly chart performance
Chart (2019)	Peak position
US Billboard 200	147
US Independent Albums (Billboard)	21
US Top R&B Albums (Billboard)	20

== Release history ==
List of release dates and formats
Region	Date	Format(s)	Label	Ref.
Various	November 21, 2019	Digital download; streaming	Tinashe Music	
Various	March 27, 2020	LP	Tinashe Music	
