= Die a Little Bit =

2019 single by Tinashe

Single by Tinashe featuring Ms Banks

from the album Songs for You
- Released: October 24, 2019
- Genre: Electropop; UK rap
- Length: 2:45
- Label: Tinashe Music
- Songwriters: Thyra Banks; Rook Monroe; Tinashe Kachingwe; Parrish Warrington; Diederik van Elsas
- Producer: Trackside

Tinashe singles chronology
"Throw a Fit" (2018)	"Die a Little Bit" (2019)	"Touch & Go" (2019)

Ms Banks singles chronology
"My Size" (2018)	"Die a Little Bit" (2019)

Music video
- "Die a Little Bit" on YouTube

"Die a Little Bit" is a song by American singer Tinashe featuring guest vocals from British rapper Ms Banks. It was released through Tinashe's independent label, Tinashe Music Inc. on October 24, 2019, as the first single from Tinashe's fourth studio album, Songs for You. The song was produced by Trackside and written by Ms Banks, Rook Monroe and Tinashe.

== Background and release ==
After the release of Tinashe's previous single "Throw a Fit" last year, she released "Die a Little Bit" for her fourth studio album. According to Rolling Stone, the single arrived following her split from RCA earlier in the year, marking a new phase in her independent career. A remix version with producer Zhu was released on July 3, 2020.

== Composition ==
"Die a Little Bit" has been described as electropop and UK rap over a throwback '90s house beat with breathy vocals and minimal production. According to Paper, the track blends Tinashe's rapped delivery and light soprano vocals with crisp London house–influenced production. British rapper Ms Banks contributes an additional verse, bringing an energetic flow to a song centered on themes of partying intensely and embracing a no-regret attitude.

== Critical reception ==
Stereogum noted its sharp, minimal club-oriented sound, produced by New York duo Trackside, and highlighted the contribution of London rapper Ms Banks. The track has additionally been compared to a more commercial take on the avant-R&B style associated with artists like Kelela.

== Music video ==
The music video for "Die a Little Bit" depicts Tinashe brooding and later partying with friends in a club setting.
