= Like I Used To (Tinashe song) =

Single by Tinashe
- Released: July 13, 2018
- Genre: Pop; R&B
- Length: 3:08
- Label: RCA
- Songwriters: Tinashe Kachingwe; Samuel David Jiminez; Christian Ward
- Producers: Smash David; Hitmaka

Tinashe singles chronology
"Me So Bad" (2018)	"Like I Used To" (2018)	"Throw a Fit" (2018)

"Like I Used To" is a song recorded by American singer Tinashe. It was released for digital download and streaming by RCA Records on July 13, 2018. The song was written by Tinashe alongside the producers of the song, Smash David and Hitmaka. The song was the lead single off Tinashe's now-scrapped album Nashe.

== Composition ==
"Liked I Used to" is a pop-R&B song described as "brisk and wistful", with a "mixture of sensuality and electronic music". It runs for 3 minutes and 8 seconds. The production being trap-influenced with a "sleek, shimmery beat", Tinashe talks about the breakup of her previous relationship with NBA Ben Simmons.

== Critical reception ==
Billboard's Alessandra Rincón calls "Like I Used To" Tinashe "asserting" her "newfound independence". Michael Love Michael of Paper describes the song as a "breakup jam". Alex Zidel from HotNewHipHop writes "Too busy in her bag to still care about the past, the only thing in Tinashe's future is money and she's making that clear on 'Like I Used To' [...] and gives us the first taste at the direction Tinashe is headed in, speaking her mind and possibly divulging how she really feels about her relationship with Simmons."

== Artwork ==
The cover shows a Polaroid picture of Tinashe popping a champagne bottle, while a red frown covers Tinashe's face along with the words "XO Nashe".

== Charts ==
Chart (2018)	Peak position
Australian Digital Singles (ARIA)	40
New Zealand Hot Singles (RMNZ)	27
US R&B Digital Song Sales (Billboard)	7

== Certifications ==
Region	Certification	Certified units/sales
New Zealand (RMNZ)	Gold	15,000^{‡}
^{‡} Sales+streaming figures based on certification alone.
