= Crash Out =

Single by Tinashe

from the album Popstar
- Released: July 16, 2026
- Genre: R&B; trap
- Length: 3:10
- Label: Tinashe Music; Nice Life; Atlantic
- Songwriters: Tinashe Kachingwe; Bobby Raps; Couros; Zikai
- Producer: Couros

Tinashe singles chronology
"Too Easy" (2026)	"Crash Out" (2026)	"Melatonin" (2026)

Music video
- "Crash Out" on YouTube

"Crash Out" is a song by American singer Tinashe from her eighth studio album, Popstar (2026). It was released on July 16, 2026, by Tinashe Music, Nice Life Recording Company, and Atlantic Records, as the second single from the album. Co-written by Bobby Raps, Couros, and Zikai, "Crash Out" was produced by Couros and is a low-tempo R&B-pop and trap song that incorporates crunk influences.

It was accompanied by a promotional campaign centered on a viral sledgehammer stunt. The song's accompanying music video was directed by 91 Rules, released on the same day of the song's release.

== Background and release ==
Following the release of "Too Easy", the lead single of Tinashe's eighth studio album, Popstar, "Crash Out" was released on July 16, 2026, along with the announcement of the album. Prior to the announcement, a video shared by content creator Christian Vierling showing Tinashe smashing a car window with a sledgehammer in Los Angeles went viral on social media. The stunt was later revealed to have been part of the promotional campaign for "Crash Out" and Popstar.

== Composition ==
Written by Tinashe, Nosaj, Zikai, and Bobby Raps, "Crash Out" is a lowtempo, R&B-pop, and trap song built around synth-driven production. The crunk-inflected track features lyrics reflecting on the "American dream" and online negativity. The Fader's Tobias Hess and Stereogum's Tom Breihan compared its sound to Tinashe's mid-2010s work with DJ Mustard.

== Critical reception and music video ==
Keithan Samuels of Rated R&B described "Crash Out" as a "West Coast-flavored bop", writing that its production complements Tinashe's "cocky and confident" performance. The accompanying music video was directed by 91 Rules. NME author Max Pilley described it as "a dance-heavy video".

Apple Music included "Crash Out" in its 'Best Songs of 2026' list.

== Charts ==
Chart performance for "Crash Out"
Chart (2026)	Peak position
New Zealand Hot Singles (RMNZ)	28
Nigeria Airplay (TurnTable)	64
Nigeria Bubbling Under Top 100 (TurnTable)	2
Nigeria International (TurnTable)	23
US Hot R&B Songs (Billboard)	21
