= Throw a Fit =

Single by Tinashe
- Released: July 26, 2018
- Length: 2:38
- Label: RCA
- Songwriters: Radric Delantic Davis; Samuel David Jiminez; Christian Ward; Melvin Moore; Jocelyn A. Donald; Jamal F. Jones; Racquelle Anteola; Mayila Caiemi Marie Jones; Jordan Holt-May; Jaucquez Lowe
- Producers: Hitmaka; Smash David

Tinashe singles chronology
"Like I Used To" (2018)	"Throw a Fit" (2018)	"Die a Little Bit" (2019)

Audio video
- "Throw a Bit" on YouTube

"Throw a Fit" is a song by American singer Tinashe. Produced by RCA Records, the song was released as a single for digital download and streaming on July 26, 2018. The song was the second single off Tinashe's now-scrapped album Nashe. The cover is notably near identical to her previous single, "Like I Used To", showing a Polaroid picture of Tinashe popping a champagne bottle, along with the words "XO Nashe". A red smile covers Tinashe's face in place of the frown used on "Like I Used To", signifying a transition to a more upbeat tone.

== Background and release ==
On June 9, 2018, Hitmaka announced on Twitter he would be serving as an executive producer for Tinashe's then-upcoming album, Nashe. On the night of the single release, Tinashe introduced her alter-ego "Nashe" on a post from her Instagram Stories and Twitter.

== Composition ==
"Throw a Fit" is a song running for 2 minutes and 38 seconds. As described as Jon Stickler of Stereoboard, Tinashe introduces a "take-no-prisoners alter-ego, Nashe". Tinashe described "Nashe" who "has 0 chill, will steal your bitch, and doesn't give a hint of fuck".

== Critical reception ==
Billboard's Sofia Mele described Tinashe's alter-ego "Nashe" as "an icy diva with attitude" and overall the song as a "bratty single", in reference to the alter-ego. Robyn Mowatt of Hypebae called "Throw a Fit" a song that Tinashe "flexes her bossy state of mind". James Rettig from Stereogum compares "Throw a Fit" and Tinashe's previous single "Like I Used To", "Where that ["Like I Used To"] song was a wistful remembrance of a past relationship, this one's more of a flexing banger". In a HotNewHipHop review, the magazine rated the song with their rating of "VERY HOTTTTT", Alex Zidel praises Tinashe for "Not depending on anybody else's money to cop what she wants, Tinashe is singing all about her love of the finer things".

== Charts ==
Chart (2018)	Peak position
US R&B/Hip-Hop Digital Songs (Billboard)	25

== Personnel ==
Credits were adapted from Tidal.

- Songwriting – Gucci Mane, Smash David, Hitmaka, Jordan Holt-May, Polow da Don, Jaucquez Lowe, Melvin Moore, Jocelyn A. Donald, Racquelle Anteola, Mayila Caiemi Marie Jones
- Production – Hitmaka, Smash David
- Vocals – Tinashe

== Release history ==
Region	Date	Format	Label	Ref.
Various	July 27, 2018	Digital download; streaming	RCA	
