= Too Easy (Tinashe song) =

Single by Tinashe

from the album Popstar
- Released: June 5, 2026
- Genre: Pop; dance; dance-pop; electropop
- Length: 1:55
- Label: Tinashe Music; Nice Life; Atlantic
- Songwriters: Tinashe Kachingwe; Bianca Atterberry
- Producers: Zack Sekoff; Kimj

Tinashe singles chronology
"No Broke Boys" (remix) (2025)	"Too Easy" (2026)	"Crash Out" (2026)

Music video
- "Too Easy" on YouTube

"Too Easy" is a song by American singer Tinashe from her eighth studio album, Popstar (2026). It was released on June 5, 2026, by Tinashe Music, Nice Life Recording Company, and Atlantic Records, as the lead single from the album. An electropop and club-oriented dance-pop track incorporating elements of 2000s R&B, it was produced by Zack Sekoff and Kimj and written by Tinashe and Bianca Atterberry.

"Too Easy" was first teased during Tinashe's Coachella DJ set in April 2026, and later previewed at a performance by the Dare in New York City. It received positive reviews from critics, with NME naming it its Best New Track of the week. "Too Easy" reached number 40 on New Zealand's Hot Singles chart.

== Background and release ==
"Too Easy" was first teased live during Tinashe's DJ set at the Do LaB stage at Coachella in April 2026. The full song was teased during a performance by the Dare on May 7, 2026 in New York City. During the American Music Awards 2026, Tinashe revealed to Billboard that the title of her then upcoming single would be "Too Easy", and that the announcement for both her single and album would be coming "in the next couple of weeks". Tinashe announced the single's cover artwork and release date on June 1.

Serving as the lead single of Tinashe's eighth studio album, Popstar, "Too Easy" was co-produced by Kimj and Zack Sekoff. Described as "usher[ing] in a new era" in a press release, the song's accompanying music video was released on the following day. On June 26, Tinashe released an extended mix lasting 3 minutes and 33 seconds exclusively on SoundCloud.

== Composition ==
"Too Easy" is a pop, dance, and club-oriented dance-pop song. Its lyrics address self-assurance and personal independence, with Tinashe singing, "If you're mad, then go to therapy / I can't help that I make it look so easy". Margaret Farrell of Stereogum described "Too Easy" as combining elements of 2000s R&B and K-pop, highlighting its prominent percussion, "la la la" vocal hooks, and bass-driven production. HotNewHipHop's Alexander Cole highlighted the song's "pulsating" electropop production and emphasis on mood and rhythm over vocal showcase performances.

== Critical reception ==
Keithan Samuels of Rated R&B described "Too Easy" as an "easy, breezy listen" and argued that its brief running time helped build anticipation for Tinashe's forthcoming material. NME ranked the song as its Best New Track of the week.

== Accolades ==
Awards and nominations for "Too Easy"
Award	Year	Category	Result	Ref.
Grammy Awards	2027	Best Dance Pop Recording	Pending	

== Charts ==
Chart performance
Chart (2026)	Peak position
New Zealand Hot Singles (RMNZ)	40
US Hot Dance/Pop Songs (Billboard)	15
