= Flame (Tinashe song) =

2017 single by Tinashe

Single by Tinashe
- Released: March 16, 2017
- Length: 3:06
- Label: RCA
- Songwriters: Tinashe Kachingwe; Nolan Lambroza; Simon Wilcox; Ilsey Juber; Nasri Atweh
- Producer: Sir Nolan

Tinashe singles chronology
"Quit You" (2017)	"Flame" (2017)	"No Drama" (2018)

Music video
- "Flame" on YouTube

"Flame" is a song recorded by American singer Tinashe. It was released on March 16, 2017 through RCA Records, and later included on the Japanese edition of her third studio album, Joyride (2018). Produced by Sir Nolan who wrote the track with Tinashe alongside Simon Wilcox, Ilsey Juber and Nasri Atweh, the song is a midtempo eighties-styled track that incorporates the singer's signature sound with pop components. Lyrically, the song talks about the relationship between her companion.

Tinashe started to tease "Flame" three days before the song's release, citing part of the lyrics in her Instagram post. On April 21, the music video for "Flame" was released, and a month later, on May 19, American DJ Kaskade remixed the track. Commercially, it peaked at number 9 on New Zealand Heatseekers chart.

== Background ==
"Flame" marks a departure from previous singles that she released in 2016, namely "Superlove" and "Company". Speaking backstage prior to headlining Sony's Lost in Music showcase at SXSW, she explained her shift in attitude regarding the Joyride's timeline, noting that she did it last year, so she's not putting "any limits" on herself even when the album had to come out.

== Release ==
Tinashe announced "Flame" on March 13, 2017, alongside the single's release date and cover art. In her Instagram post, she quoted part of the lyrics: "Tell me that you've still got the flame for me". On May 19, a remix version of the song by American producer Kaskade was released.

== Composition ==
"Flame" is a midtempo eighties-styled track described as "slow-burning", incorporating fluffy synthesizers and pounding drums. It shows Tinashe desperately wants to hold on to her companion even though their fiery love ends chilly. Produced by Sir Nolan, the song's instrumentation was compared to "Style" by Taylor Swift. Lyrically, "Flame" talks about trying to save a relationship.

== Music video ==
The music video for "Flame" was released on April 21, 2017. The video starts off with Tinashe glowing in relationship bliss, but as it continues, things get progressively darker. It concludes with a house completely up in flames, featuring photographs and memories melting in the fire.

== Reception ==
Rated R&B noted "Flame" as "infectious track", stating that the song encompasses Tinashe's "signature sound with pop elements". On March 31, 2017, the song was chosen as a theme song for WWE's WrestleMania 33.

== Live performance ==
On March 30, 2017, Tinashe performed "Flame" on The Tonight Show Starring Jimmy Fallon.

== Charts ==
Chart (2017)	Peak position
Australian Urban Singles (ARIA)	14
New Zealand Heatseekers (RMNZ)	9

== Release history ==
Country	Date	Format	Version	Label	Ref.
Various	March 16, 2017	Digital download; streaming	Original	RCA	
United States	April 11, 2017	Contemporary hit radio	Original	RCA	
Various	May 19, 2017	Digital download; streaming	Kaskade remix	RCA	
