= Me So Bad =

Single by Tinashe featuring Ty Dolla Sign and French Montana

from the album Joyride
- Released: March 30, 2018
- Genre: R&B
- Length: 3:11
- Label: RCA
- Songwriters: Tinashe Kachingwe; Tyrone Griffin, Jr.; Karim Karbouch; Simon Schranz; Floyd Bentley; Christian Ward; Montrell Martinez; Nigel Bond; Andre Proctor; Mayila Caiemi Marie Jones; Christopher Dotson; Mele Moore
- Producers: Hitmaka; Dre Moon; BLWYRMND; A1; Wavy

Tinashe singles chronology
"Faded Love" (2018)	"Me So Bad" (2018)	"Like I Used To" (2018)

French Montana singles chronology
"Famous" (2017)	"Me So Bad" (2018)	"Olha a Explosão (Remix)" (2018)

Ty Dolla Sign singles chronology
"Psycho" (2018)	"Me So Bad" (2018)	"Off Guard" (2018)

Music video
- "Me So Bad" on YouTube

"Me So Bad" is a song recorded by American singer Tinashe, featuring fellow American singer Ty Dolla Sign and American rapper French Montana. It was written by the three said artists, Hitmaka, and A1 Bentley. It was released commercially for digital download via RCA Records on March 30, 2018, as the third and final single from Tinashe's third studio album, Joyride (2018), along with the album's pre-order.

== Background ==
The song was first revealed in a picture Tinashe posted on social media on January 12, 2018. The singer teased the song again one week prior to its release. The song was released along with Joyride's pre-order.

== Composition ==
"Me So Bad" is a "synth-heavy" R&B song with an island flavor. The song is three minutes and eleven seconds long. The song is in the key of B♭m, and moves at a tempo of 100 beats per minute in a 4/4 time signature. The song sees the singer confidently flaunting her body in the lyrics: "You want some me so bad, Come get this body."

== Critical reception ==
Mike Nied of Idolator compared the song to Tinashe's previous singles "No Drama" and "Faded Love" and called it "the most energized of the group."

== Music video ==
The music video for "Me So Bad" was released the same day as the single's release. The video is tennis-themed, and features Tinashe performing the song on a tennis court. The video also features stylized choreography and the singer in a plaid skirt and platinum braids, as well as a soft velour tracksuit. The music video for "Me So Bad" has become Tinashe's fastest to reach one million views on YouTube in 24 hours.

== Credits and personnel ==
Recording and management

- Recorded at Glenwood Place Recording Studios (Burbank, California)
- Mixed at Larrabee Sound Studios (North Hollywood, California)
- Mastered at Chris Athens Masters (Austin, Texas)
- Published by Shaybug Music/Sony/ATV Songs LLC (BMI), My Lord Prophet Music/APG/WB Music Corp. (ASCAP), Warner-Tamerlane Publishing Corp. (BMI), Phil Trackson/Primary Wave Beats/BMG Platinum Songs US (BMI), Radical Publishing Group LLC, BMG Rights Management LLC (BMI), The Songs Right Now Publishing/Warner-Tamerlane Publishing Corp. (BMI), Mayila Caiemi Marie Jones Publishing Designee (ASCAP), It's Drugs Publishing/EMI Blackwood Music, Inc. (BMI), Excuse My French Music II/Sony/ATV Allegro (ASCAP)
- Ty Dolla Sign appears courtesy of Atlantic Recording Corporation.
- French Montana appears courtesy of Bad Boy Entertainment/Epic Records, a division of Sony Music Entertainment.

Personnel

- Tinashe – lead vocals, composition
- Ty Dolla Sign – featured artist, composition
- French Montana – featured artist, composition
- Christian "Hitmaka" Ward – composition, production
- Andre "Dre Moon" Proctor – composition, production
- Floyd "A1" Bentley – composition, production
- Montrell "Wavy" Martinez – composition, production
- Simon "BLWYRMND" Schranz – composition, production
- Mele Moore – composition
- Christopher "Chrishan" Dotson – composition
- Mayila Caiemi Marie Jones – composition
- Miagi – recording
- Jaycen Joshua – mixing
- David Nakaji – mixing assistant
- Ben Mitchev – mixing assistant
- Chris Athens – mastering

Credits adapted from the liner notes of Joyride.

== Charts ==
Chart performance for "Me So Bad"
Chart (2018)	Peak position
Australian Urban Singles (ARIA)	37
Japan Hot 100 (Billboard)	87
Japan Hot Overseas (Billboard Japan)	16
New Zealand Heatseekers (RMNZ)	7
UK Video Streaming (OCC)	70
US Hot R&B Songs (Billboard)	21
