= Nightride (album) =

Studio album by Tinashe
- Released: November 4, 2016
- Length: 51:32
- Label: RCA
- Producers: Allen Ritter; Atu; Boi-1da; Brent Reynolds; Joel Compass; Devonte Hynes; Dpat; Illangelo; King Kachingwe; Metro Boomin; Sango; Stephen Spencer; The Beat Bully; The-Dream; Vinylz

Tinashe chronology
Amethyst (2015)	Nightride (2016)	Joyride (2018)

Singles from Nightride
- 1. "Company" Released: September 16, 2016

Nightride is the second studio album by American singer Tinashe. It was released on November 4, 2016 through RCA Records. Serving as a digital release issued ahead of her long-delayed third album Joyride, the project includes previously released singles such as "Company", and "Ride of Your Life". The album's version of "Party Favors" omits rapper Young Thug's guest verse, and unlike her previous releases, Nightride features no other guest appearances.

Conceived alongside Joyride as two parts of the same project, Tinashe described Nightride as reflecting her interest in exploring multiple sides of her identity, emphasizing duality and variety in her music. She also released a short film of the same name to accompany the album.

Musically, Nightride continues Tinashe's atmospheric R&B style, defined by sparse production and layered vocals. It received generally favorable reviews from music critics, who noted its moody and after-hours sound, and was described by Billboard as the darker counterpart to Joyride. The album peaked at number 89 on the US Billboard 200 and appeared on several year-end best-of lists, including Rolling Stone, Fuse, and Uproxx.

== Background ==
In a video for Nylon, Tinashe discussed the delays surrounding Joyride. She stated that "the creative process has its ebbs and flows", and that the album would be released once it was complete. Around the same period, she also confirmed via Instagram that she had collaborated with Britney Spears, following speculation about the partnership. With Rolling Stone, Tinashe explained that Nightride and Joyride were conceived as two parts of the same project, noting that the majority of Joyride had already been completed. She described both projects as equally representative of her artistic vision, emphasizing the duality and variety in her music. In a note posted on Twitter, she further stated that the project reflected her interest in expressing multiple sides of herself, writing that "being human is about embracing the many different sides of you rather than trying to limit, label, or box yourself in... Nightride is an expression of that duality."

In 2019, Tinashe confirmed that she considers Nightride as her second studio album. However, her former label RCA Records disagreed, and it was the reason why the album didn't receive proper promotion and a lead single. She also revealed that she couldn't hold the tour for the album.

== Release and promotion ==
Prior to the release, Tinashe teased fans with singles including "Superlove" and "Company", initially promoting a fall release under the title Joyride. On November 3, 2016, she announced Nightride, revealing the cover art and tracklist which features 15 songs. Ahead of the release of her long-delayed album Joyride, Tinashe issued Nightride as a digital album on November 4. It includes several previously released tracks, such as "Ride of Your Life", produced by Metro Boomin, "Company", and "Party Favors", featuring Young Thug. Tinashe also issued a short film of the same name, which served as a visual counterpart to the project.

=== Singles ===
The album's lead single, "Company", was released on September 16, 2016. It was produced by The-Dream and Tricky Stewart. On January 6, 2017, the music video for the song was released.

== Composition ==
According to The Fader editor Myles Tanzer, Nightride presents Tinashe in a fully solo capacity, with the album's version of "Party Favors" that omits Young Thug's original guest verse. The album continues her "familiar dreamy R&B" style, featuring no guest appearances unlike her previous two releases; Aquarius and Amethyst. Kitty Empire of The Observer also notes that the album functions as Tinashe's first substantial body of work since Aquarius.

"Company"
The 25-second sample of "Company", which showcases the album's ability to transform R&B into a darker, more alluring form using "sexy, glitch-y" production and an intimate after-hours vibe.

As noted by Brittany Spanos of Rolling Stone, the project adopts an "intoxicating afterhours vibe", developing its R&B foundation through "sexy, glitch-y" production and a "melancholy late-night" atmosphere that shapes tracks, such as "Ride of Your Life" and "Company", into darker and more alluring forms. Nightride also sustains a "moonlit" and unhurried soundscape driven by wispy slow-tempo arrangements, with songs like "Lucid Dreaming", "Sacrifices", "Soul Glitch", and "Ride of Your Life"; unfolding through subdued beats, intimate vocal layering, and subtle melodic figures. The Pitchfork review by Rebecca Haithcoat further states that the album avoids the "glossy production and gospel-influenced", as it showboats "singing style characteristic of traditional R&B" instead "leaning on woozy, atmospheric beats that nodded to chopped-n-screwed culture". Overall, the production is described as "drizzly and overcast", with the music being "strictly after-hours music". The album's first half is described as heavily weighted with "somber ballads", and the project has "an ominous, broken-down carnival vibe", which is less sleek and cold than the title suggests. For the deep groove of "Sunburn", Tinashe shifts from her usual breathiness to a richer vocal tone.

The Los Angeles Times review, which notes the album's dual meaning, Randall Roberts states that Nightride blends "themes of both cruising and loving". Across its 15 tracks, the album addresses the theme of movement, with Tinashe singing of "moving from state to state" on the opener "Lucid Dreaming," and of "leaving the city at dawn" to chase good weather during "C'est la Vie". The songs were produced by variety of producers such as the-Dream, Boi-1da, and Dev Hynes. Pitchfork's Haithcoat highlights the high number of producers relative to the track count, yet finds their work to be excellent and cohesive. This includes contributions from newcomer Stephen Spencer, noted for the "glitchy-yet-sultry slow-burner 'Spacetime'", and producers like Metro Boomin, Boi-1da, and the-Dream. The-Dream's track, "Company", is singled out as the only "cloudless" or overtly cheerful song on the project. The album opener, "Lucid Dreaming", is called a "soothing balm" whose wooden chimes suggest the calmness of savasana. Other specific cuts mentioned for their unconventional sound include the "lopsided, one-wheel-falling-off wonk" of "Ride of Your Life" and the "off-kilter banger" "Party Favors" that is described as inflating and deflating like helium. The review concludes by referencing the line whispered after "Sacrifices", where Tinashe defiantly states, "I will not be ignored".

== Critical reception ==
Professional ratings
Aggregate scores
Source	Rating
AnyDecentMusic?	6.7/10
Metacritic	75/100
Review scores
Source	Rating
AllMusic	3.5/5 stars
HotNewHipHop	80%
Los Angeles Times	70%
The Observer	3/5 stars
Pitchfork	7.8/10

Nightride received generally favorable reviews from music critics. At Metacritic, which assigns a normalized rating out of 100 to reviews from mainstream publications, the album received an average score of 75, based on 5 reviews.

Randall Roberts of the Los Angeles Times commented that the album "mixes themes of both cruising and loving" and achieved this through tracks produced by notables including the-Dream, Boi 1da and Dev Hynes. Rebecca Haithcoat of the Pitchfork stated Nightride sounds "fascinating and, while polished, less sleek and cold than the title suggests". Haithcoat characterized the sound as having "more of an ominous, broken-down carnival vibe" and noted that Tinashe "has long preferred shadows and slinkiness to bright poppiness, and [Nightride] is strictly after-hours music". Kitty Empire of The Observer gave a more mixed but still positive review; describing the tracks from Nightride as a series of "hazy, gauzy tracks". Richy Rosario from Billboard stated that if Tinashe's forthcoming album Joyride was intended to be "sunny", then Nightride served as its "darker polar opposite".

=== Year-end lists ===
List of year-end lists
Publication	Accolade	Rank	Ref.
Rolling Stone	20 Best R&B Albums of 2016	16	
Fuse	The Best 20 Albums of 2016	14	
Uproxx	The Best R&B Albums of 2016	10	
Billboard	15 Best Overlooked Hip-Hop & R&B Albums of the 2010s	5	

== Commercial performance ==
In the United States, Nightride peaked at number 89 on the US Billboard 200 chart. It also reached number 8 on the US Top R&B/Hip-Hop Albums chart. Internationally, the album also charted, peaking at number 12 on the Australian Urban Albums chart and reaching number 3 on the New Zealand Heatseeker Albums chart. In the UK, it peaked at number 16 on the UK R&B Albums chart and number 78 on the UK Album Downloads chart.

== Track listing ==
Nightride track listing
No.	Title	Writer(s)	Producer(s)	Length
1.	"Lucid Dreaming"	Tinashe Kachingwe; Brent Reynolds; Anthony Tucker	Reynolds; The Beat Bully	4:29
2.	"C'est La Vie"	Kachingwe; David "Dpat" Patino	Dpat	3:35
3.	"Sunburn"	Kachingwe; Patino; Kai Wright; James Lovell; Atupele Ndisale	Sango; Dpat; Atu	3:59
4.	"Binaural Test (Interlude)"	Kachingwe		0:14
5.	"Sacrifices"	Kachingwe; A. Sneed; Leland Wayne	Metro Boomin	4:14
6.	"Company"	Terius Nash; Kachingwe	The-Dream	4:25
7.	"Soul Glitch"	Kachingwe; A. Sneed; Patino	Dpat	4:11
8.	"You Don't Know Me"	Kachingwe; Wright; Patino	Sango; Dpat	3:15
9.	"Spacetime"	Kachingwe; Stephen Spencer	Spencer	4:22
10.	"High Speed Chase (Interlude)"	Kachingwe; Thulani Kachingwe	King Kachingwe	1:10
11.	"Ride of Your Life"	Kachingwe; Wayne; Latasha Williams; Bobby Brackins	Metro Boomin	3:30
12.	"Party Favors"	Kachingwe; Allen Ritter; Anderson Hernandez; Matthew Samuels; Carlo Montagnese	Illangelo; Ritter; Vinylz; Boi-1da	4:08
13.	"You Can Stay Here Tonight (Interlude)"	Kachingwe		0:14
14.	"Touch Pass"	Kachingwe; A. Sneed; Joel Compass	Wolf Cousins	4:43
15.	"Ghetto Boy"	Kachingwe; Scott Hoffman; Nicola Roberts; Devonte Hynes	Hynes	5:03
Total length:				51:32

=== Notes ===
- The album version of "Party Favors" doesn't include a verse of Young Thug.

== Personnel ==
Credits were adapted from Tidal.

=== Musicians ===
- Tinashe Kachingwe – associated performer (1–3, 5–15), composer (1–3, 5, 7–12, 14, 15), lyricist (1–3, 5, 7–12, 14, 15), producer (4, 13), mixing engineer (8)
- Anthony Tucker – composer (1), lyricist (1)
- Brent Reynolds – composer (1), lyricist (1)
- Dominic Thomas – composer (1, 7), lyricist (1, 7)
- David Patino – composer (2, 3, 7, 8), lyricist (2, 3, 7, 8)
- Atupele Ndisale – composer (3, 8), lyricist (3, 8)
- Kai Wright – composer (3, 8), lyricist (3, 8)
- Latasha Williams – composer (5, 11), lyricist (5, 11)
- Leland Wayne – composer (5, 11), lyricist (5, 11)
- Terius Nash – composer (6), lyricist (6), background vocal (6), keyboards (6), programmer (6)
- Dacoury Natche – composer (7), lyricist (7)
- Wasalu Jaco – composer (7), lyricist (7)
- Stephen Spencer – composer (9), lyricist (9)
- Thulani Kachingwe – composer (10), lyricist (10)
- Bobby Brackins – composer (11), lyricist (11)
- Anderson Hernandez – composer (12), lyricist (12)
- Alan Ritter – composer (12), lyricist (12)
- Carlo Montagnese – composer (12), lyricist (12)
- Jeffrey Lamar Williams – composer (12), lyricist (12)
- Matthew Samuels – composer (12), lyricist (12)
- Joel Compass – composer (14), lyricist (14), mixing engineer (14), vocal producer (14)
- Rosina Russell – composer (14), lyricist (14)
- Devonté Hynes – composer (15), lyricist (15), bass (15), guitar (15), piano (15), programmer (15), synthesizer (15)
- Nicola Roberts – composer (15), lyricist (15)
- Scott Hoffman – composer (15), lyricist (15)

=== Production ===
- Anthony Tucker aka "The Beatbully" – producer (1)
- Ritz Reynolds – producer (1)
- Dpat – producer (2, 3, 7, 8)
- Atu – producer (3, 8)
- Sango – producer (3, 8)
- Metro Boomin – producer (5, 11)
- Terius "The Dream" Nash – producer (6)
- Stephen Spencer – producer (9)
- Thulani Kachingwe – producer (10)
- Alan Ritter – producer (12)
- Illangelo – producer (12)
- Boi-1da – co-producer (12)
- Vinylz – co-producer (12)
- Joel Compass – producer (14)
- Babydaddy – producer (15), piano (15), programmer (15), synthesizer (15)
- Devonté Hynes – producer (15)
- Erik Madrid – mixing engineer (1, 2, 3, 9)
- Jaycen Joshua – mixing engineer (5, 6, 7, 11, 12, 15)
- Jorge Gutiérrez – assistant engineer (1, 2, 3, 9)
- Dave Nakaji – assistant engineer (5, 6, 7, 11, 15)
- Maddox Chhim – assistant engineer (5, 6, 7, 11, 12, 15)
- Joshua Lance – recording engineer (5, 11)
- Mischke – recording engineer (6), vocal producer (6)
- Nathaniel Alford – recording engineer (6)
- Fletcher Vaughn – assistant engineer (6)
- Jeremy Brown – assistant engineer (6)
- William Lovely – assistant engineer (6)
- Ryan Kaul – assistant engineer (12)

== Charts ==
Chart (2016)	Peak position
Australian Digital Albums (ARIA)	44
Australian Urban Albums (ARIA)	12
New Zealand Heatseeker Albums (RMNZ)	3
UK Album Downloads (Official Charts)	78
UK R&B Albums (Official Charts)	16
US Billboard 200	89
US Top R&B/Hip-Hop Albums (Billboard)	8

== Release history ==
Release history
Region	Date	Format	Label	Ref.
Various	November 4, 2016	CD; digital download; streaming	RCA	
