= Joyride (Tinashe album) =

Studio album by Tinashe
- Released: April 13, 2018
- Recorded: 2015–2017
- Length: 36:51
- Label: RCA
- Producers: Trevor Jerideau; Mike Nazzaro; Ali Nazzaro; Floyd "A1" Bentley; Allen Ritter; BLWYRMND; Brilliance; Dre Moon; Felix Snow; Hitmaka; Mario Luciano; J. White Did It; Joel Compass; Reckless; Ritz Reynolds; Soundz; Stargate; T-Minus; Wavy

Tinashe chronology
| Nightride (2016) | Joyride (2018) | Songs for You (2019) |

Singles from Joyride
- 1. "No Drama" Released: January 18, 2018; 2. "Faded Love" Released: February 12, 2018; 3. "Me So Bad" Released: March 30, 2018

Joyride is the third studio album by American singer Tinashe. It was released through RCA Records on April 13, 2018. Following her 2016 album Nightride, the creation of Joyride is marked as complex development period spanning over three years, during which Tinashe recorded an estimated 100 songs and dealt with multiple challenges, such as record label decisions and changes to the album's proposed singles. Tinashe stated that the album's title reflects her career as "an adventure, a journey, a ride" following years of constant travel and experience.

Joyride features collaborations with Max Martin, Metro Boomin, and Boi-1da, and was supported by three official singles: "No Drama" (featuring Offset), "Faded Love" (featuring Future), and "Me So Bad" (featuring Ty Dolla Sign and French Montana). Critically, it received generally positive reviews from music critics, earning an average score of 66 out of 100 on Metacritic. The album charted at number 58 on the US Billboard 200, number 78 on the UK Albums Chart, and charted in several territories including Canada, Australia and the Netherlands.

== Background ==
In the summer of 2015, Tinashe joined Nicki Minaj for US concerts on the Pinkprint Tour. She also joined Katy Perry's tour in both September, and October, in the South American leg of the Prismatic World Tour.

In an interview on March 30, 2018, Tinashe claimed that releasing "Flame" as the lead single was a decision initiated by her label, which she agreed to by choosing to "trust" their judgment at the time. After the single failed to achieve the expected results, she said the experience prompted her to take "back into the driver's seat". Additional complications arose around the album's title track, which Tinashe had initially co-written with Travis Scott and Hit-Boy. According to Tinashe, she had expressed interest in using the song as the album's namesake, but communication with Scott became difficult after he began dating Rihanna, who later acquired the track. Although the song ultimately went unused, Tinashe later regained the rights to it and reworked the piece, removing Scott's contributions before finalizing it for the project.

== Writing and recording ==
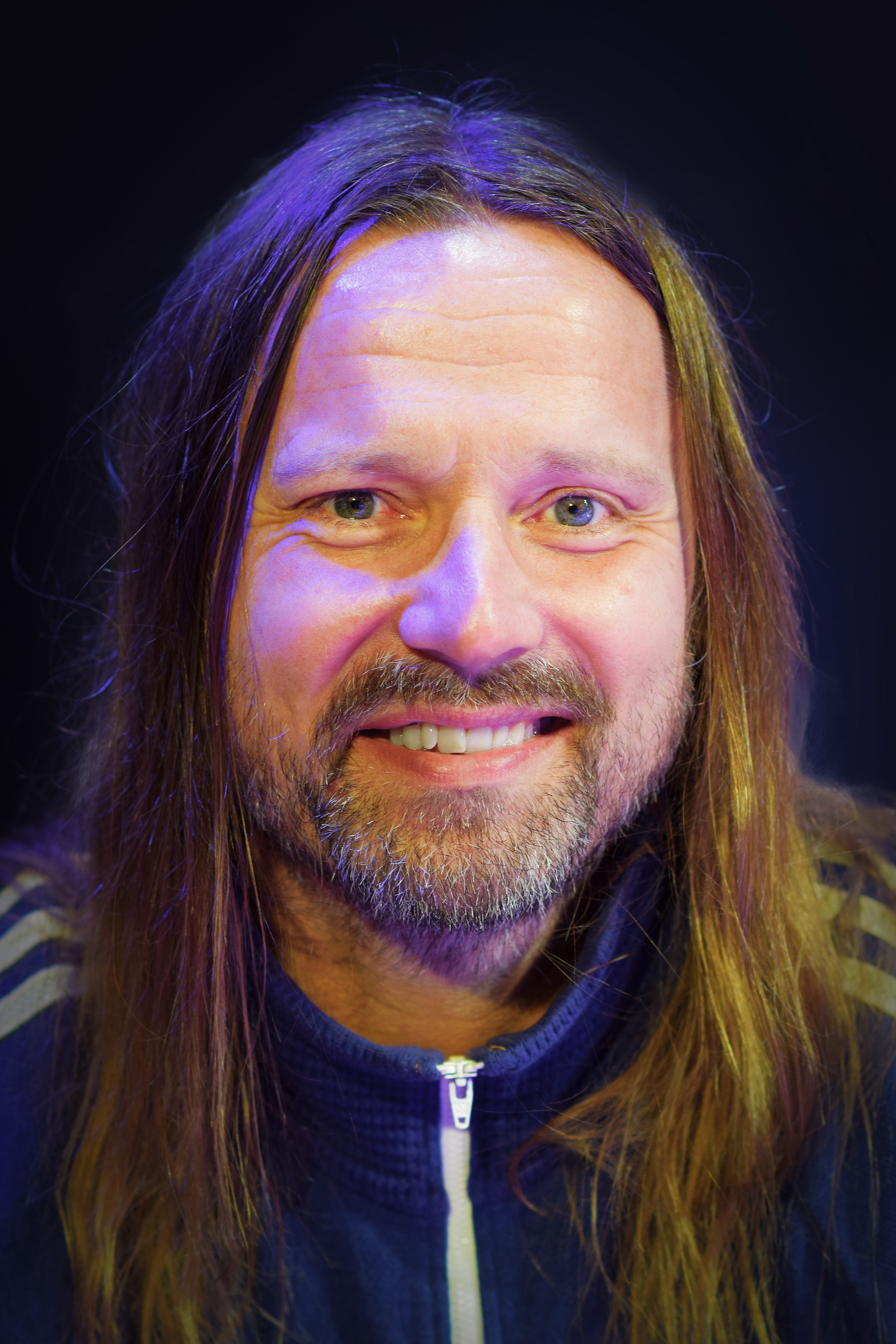
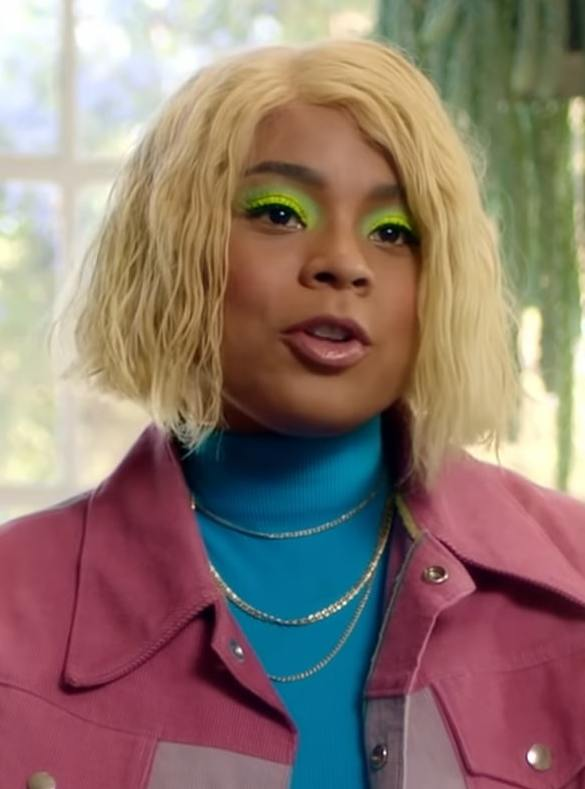
Max Martin (left) and Taylor Parx (right) were among the writers and producers Tinashe worked with during early phases of recording and writing for Joyride.

The writing and recording for Joyride went through several phases. In late January 2015, Tinashe was reported to be working with writers and producers from Prescription Songs (Cirkut, Ammo, Rock City, Jakob Kasher, Chloe Angelides), Max Martin and Taylor Parks on the album. After months of silence after the release of the album's then-latest lead single "Flame", Tinashe confirmed that she was still working on her new album with producers, such as Metro Boomin, Boi-1da, Charlie Handsome and others, on July 11, 2017.

In an April 2018 article of Vulture, Tinashe explained that once she brought producers and writers into the process, she was working in the studio daily, an experience she described as a creative "turning point". She recalled regaining a strong sense of confidence and purpose during that period, adding that it was when she felt, "Okay, I'm doing this", and fully committed to making her best music. Tinashe admitted that "three [different] versions of this album exist" and that there "are probably 200 songs" total that were recorded over the course of a three-year period.

== Music ==
On the album's opener, Tinashe repeatedly delivers the refrain "Keep your eyes on the road". The title track "Joyride" is a "foreboding" song that features Tinashe singing in a "lower register", described as having a "slightly devilish lilt", over Hit-Boy's "slightly abrasive drums". "No Drama", a trap-styled song, features brash, rapped verses over a lopsided beat, positioning it as a stylistic successor to 2014's "2 On". "He Don't Want It" is a "sleepy" song, which stands out for its "seductive hooks" and detailed production. "Ooh La La" is a breezy midtempo track centered on unrequited love, featuring a sample of Nelly and Kelly Rowland's "Dilemma" (2002).

"Me So Bad", which features a guest verse from French Montana, recalls Rihanna's delivery of "naked naked naked" on "Wild Thoughts". While "Ain't Good for Ya" is the "flute jam" record, "Stuck with Me" is a "fun, stripped-down" song, drawing comparison to Janet Jackson. "Salt" is a "smoldering" and "slightly bluesy" track that showcases Tinashe's "maturing vocals", adding a darker tonal shade to the album. Featuring Future, "Faded Love" is a "bounding", "bittersweet" and "club-ready" song, which balances emotional tension with forward momentum. "No Contest" evokes a style associated with artists such as Ciara. "Fires and Flames", a piano-led ballad, is characterized as "sweetly aching", emphasizing emotional restraint and vulnerability.

== Release and promotion ==
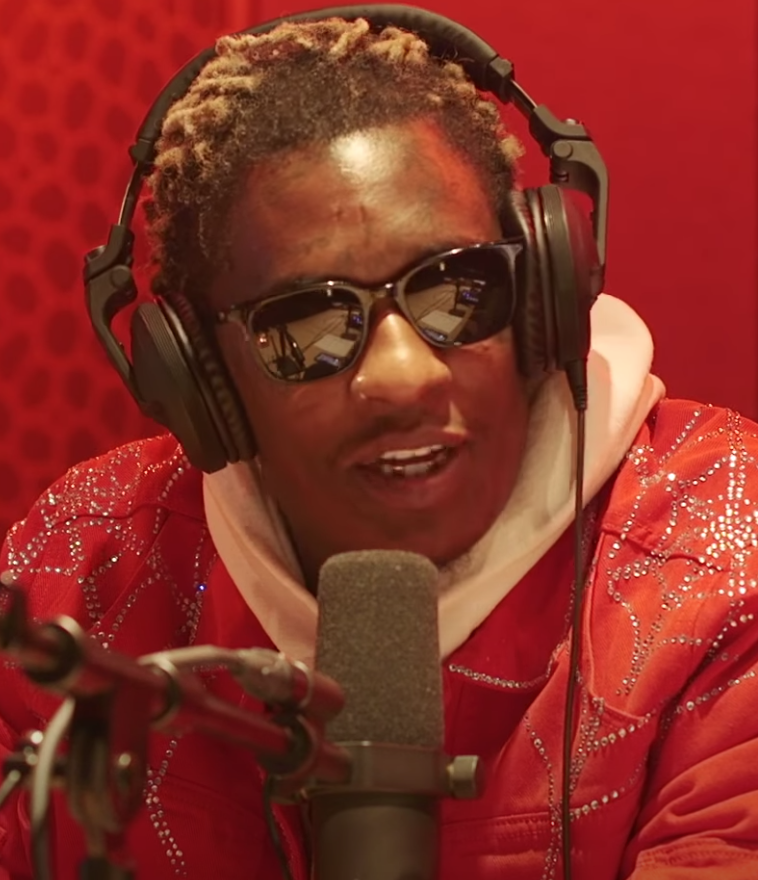
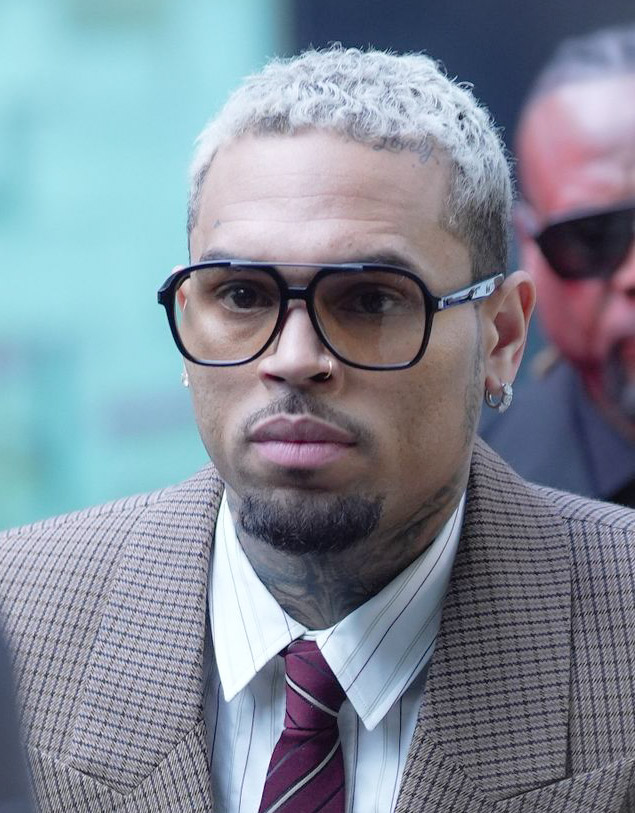
Young Thug (left) was featured on "Party Favors", while Chris Brown (right) was featured on "Player", which was initially intended to be the album's lead single.

On September 2, 2015, Tinashe released a teaser for Joyride on YouTube. On September 9, Tinashe leaked the buzz single, "Party Favors", featuring rapper Young Thug. On October 2, Tinashe released another song, "Player" featuring Chris Brown, as the first intended to be the lead single of the album. On October 21, Tinashe was featured on British electronic duo Snakeships' track, "All My Friends". A few weeks later, on November 17, Tinashe held a breakfast listening party for Joyride at the Sony Club in New York City, which was attended by reporters and various other members of the music industry. At this event, she played at least one song that wound up on the final version of Joyride: the album's closing track, "Fires and Flames."

Tinashe revealed a promotional single "Ride of Your Life" on February 2, 2016. After a few months without releasing new music, she released a new intended lead single, entitled "Superlove"; it was released on July 15, and the music video directed by Hannah Lux Davis debuted on August 12. Tinashe stated that the song was created to promote positivity and celebrate uplifting, joyful energy. On September 15, with a MTV Wonderland performance, Tinashe released "Company" as the album's intended second single. However, the song ended up being included in her 2016 album Nightride, among "Party Favors" (without Young Thug), "Ride of Your Life", "Sacrifices", "Soul Glitch", "Ghetto Boy", and "Touch Pass".

On March 16, 2017, Tinashe released yet another intended lead single for Joyride, which was also initially premiered at Joyride's November 2015 listening party, "Flame". After continuing to work on the album through the summer of 2017, Tinashe announced the release of three new singles from Joyride on January 12, 2018.

On March 16, 2018, Tinashe revealed the Joyride artwork on her Instagram and announced the album would be released on April 13. On April 25, a special edition of Joyride was released exclusively in Japan, which includes the first three original intended singles, "Player" which features AK-69 instead of Chris Brown, "Superlove", and "Flame" as bonus tracks, as well as new track "L-O-V-E".

Tinashe explained to Billboard that the title reflects her career as "an adventure, a journey, a ride" following her travels and experiences over the past year. The album cover art was made by Amber Park and features Tinashe posing in a "futuristic gown" along with a spike-covered jetpack emerging from her back. The last page of the Joyride booklet as part of the CD features a page dedicated to her thanks, including her long-time attorney Dina LaPolt, who has previously worked with Fifth Harmony, Britney Spears, Deadmau5, among others.

=== Singles ===
Joyride was supported by three singles. "No Drama" featuring Offset was released as the first single on January 18, 2018, with an accompanying music video. "Faded Love" featuring Future was released on the following month, February 12. A vertical video was released via Spotify on February 16, and on YouTube three days later. On March 30, the third single, "Me So Bad", featuring Ty Dolla Sign and French Montana, was released along with a music video.

=== Tour ===
Tinashe announced the Joyride World Tour on January 12, 2016, to support the album. Beginning in February 2016, it was scheduled through May 2016 including dates in North America, Europe, Asia, and Oceania. However, the tour was ultimately canceled, as Tinashe chose to prioritize completing new material for the album, noting that she expected to finish the "final touches" on Joyride by the end of May and return to touring afterward. She also explained that the postponement stemmed from "unexpected recording commitments", adding that the tour had originally been planned to support Joyride, which had not yet reached a stage she felt ready to release.

== Critical reception ==
Professional ratings
Aggregate scores
| Source | Rating |
|---|---|
| AnyDecentMusic? | 6.2/10 |
| Metacritic | 66/100 |
Review scores
| Source | Rating |
| AllMusic | 3.5/5 stars |
| Exclaim! | 7/10 |
| The Guardian | 3/5 stars |
| Highsnobiety | 3.5/5 |
| The Independent | 3/5 stars |
| NME | 4/5 stars |
| The Observer | 3/5 stars |
| Pitchfork | 6.8/10 |
| Rolling Stone | 3/5 stars |
| Under the Radar | 5/10 |

Joyride received generally positive reviews from music critics. At Metacritic, which assigns a normalised rating out of 100 to reviews from mainstream critics, the album has an average score of 66 based on thirteen reviews, indicating "generally favorable reviews".

Israel Daramola of Spin wrote in a positive review that the album is "a cool and sexy record", and "well-crafted and ambitious." For Exclaim!, Ryan B. Patrick characterized it as "a stop-start journey" that, while not completely stalling out, felt like some ground had been lost. Andy Kellman of AllMusic stated that the album's highlights were "filled with rich details and seductive hooks". Kellman also argued that the songs "Salt" and "Fires and Flames" effectively invalidated claims that Tinashe is "one-dimensional". In a positive review, Zoë Madonna of The Boston Globe stated that "the most fascinating offerings" on the album were tracks which the singer recorded herself in her home studio, adding that "in these tracks, she touches something stellar". In another positive review of the album, Hannah Mylrea of NME called the album "brilliantly good fun", and "mainly worth the two year wait".

In a mixed review of the album, Ben Devlin of MusicOMH noted that the album's intro and hard-edged title track initially "create a sense of concept". However, Devlin argued that this concept was quickly "discarded for the song 'No Drama'", and that a sense of adhesion "never quite returns to the album". In another mixed review of the album, Roisin O'Connor of The Independent noted that Joyride contains "its shining points", and it tries to "remain true to a cohesive, moodier tone". However, the author concluded that the album was "missing the strong, catchier elements that helped Tinashe rise in the first place".

== Commercial performance ==
Joyride debuted at number 58 on the US Billboard 200 for the week of April 28, 2018, selling 9,800 album-equivalent units in its first week, of which 4,710 came from pure sales. It also reached number 29 on the US Billboard Top R&B/Hip-Hop Albums chart. The album debuted at number 55 on the Canadian Albums Chart, becoming the singer's first album to chart on the chart.

In Europe, Joyride reached number 78 on the UK Albums Chart, making it her first album to chart since 2014's Aquarius, as it peaked at the same ranking with that album. In Australia, the album reached number 76 on the ARIA Charts. On the Dutch Albums chart, the album peaked at number 103, becoming the singer's first album to chart on it.

== Track listing ==
Credits were adapted from Tidal, ASCAP and BMI.

Joyride – standard edition
| No. | Title | Writer(s) | Producer(s) | Length |
|---|---|---|---|---|
| 1. | "Keep Your Eyes on the Road (Intro)" | Tinashe Kachingwe | Tinashe | 1:09 |
| 2. | "Joyride" | Kachingwe; Chauncey Hollis; Allen Ritter; Jacques Webster | Hit-Boy; Ritter^{[a]} | 3:25 |
| 3. | "No Drama" (featuring Offset) | Kachingwe; Kiari Cephus; Mikkel Storleer Eriksen; Tor Erik Hermansen | Stargate | 3:20 |
| 4. | "He Don't Want It" | Kachingwe; Tyler Williams | T-Minus | 2:52 |
| 5. | "Ooh La La" | Kachingwe; Anthony White; Diren Teper; Jocelyn A. Donald; Klenord Raphael; Denisia "Blu June" Andrews; Brittany "Chi" Coney | Todd Cooper; J. White Did It | 3:15 |
| 6. | "Me So Bad" (featuring Ty Dolla Sign and French Montana) | Kachingwe; Tyrone Griffin, Jr.; Karim Kharbouch; Simon "BLWYRMND" Schranz; Andre Proctor; Floyd "A1" Bentley; Christian Ward; Montrell "Wavy" Martinez; Melvin Moore; Christopher Dotson; Mayila Caiemi Marie Jones | Dre Moon; A1; Hitmaka; Wavy; BLWYRMND | 3:08 |
| 7. | "Ain't Good for Ya (Interlude)" | Kachingwe; Mario Luciano; Sidnie Tipton; Robert "Bobby" Brackins | Luciano | 1:03 |
| 8. | "Stuck with Me" (featuring Little Dragon) | Kachingwe; Yukimi Nagano; Erik Bodin; Fredrik Wallin; Hakan Wilhelm; Chelsea Davenport; Marcus Moore; William Vanderheyden; David Singer-Vine | Felix Snow; Reckless | 3:25 |
| 9. | "Go Easy on Me (Interlude)" | Kachingwe; Brent Reynolds | Tinashe; Reynolds | 0:31 |
| 10. | "Salt" | Kachingwe; Kenneth Coby; Kieran Lasker; Clarence Coffee, Jr.; Sarah Hudson | Soundz; Brilliance^{[a]} | 3:48 |
| 11. | "Faded Love" (featuring Future) | Kachingwe; Nayvadius Wilburn; Eriksen; Hermansen; Jonnali Mikaela Parmenius; Sasha Sloan | Stargate | 3:24 |
| 12. | "No Contest" | Kachingwe; Coby; Jeremih Felton; Sayyid McDonald; Raymon Holton | Soundz | 3:47 |
| 13. | "Fires and Flames" | Kachingwe; K-Stewart; Joel Compass; Amanda Ghost | Compass; Ghost; Mark Ralph^{[b]} | 3:46 |
| Total length: | | | | 36:51 |

Joyride – Japanese edition
| No. | Title | Writer(s) | Producer(s) | Length |
|---|---|---|---|---|
| 14. | "L-O-V-E" | Tricky Stewart; Terius Nash; Loudridge Juste | Stewart; The-Dream | 3:27 |
| 15. | "Superlove" | Kachingwe; Stewart; Nash; Kgaugelo Nalane | Stewart; The-Dream | 3:03 |
| 16. | "Player (remix)" (featuring AK-69) | Kachingwe; Alexander Kronlund; Lukas Loules; Chloe Angelides | Lulou; Kronlund | 3:22 |
| 17. | "Flame" | Kachingwe; Nolan Lambroza; Simon Wilcox; Ilsey Juber; Nasri Atweh | Sir Nolan | 3:07 |
| Total length: | | | | 49:10 |

=== Notes ===
- ^{^[a]} signifies a co-producer.
- ^{^[b]} signifies an additional producer.

=== Sample credits ===
- "Joyride" samples "Vulnerable" performed by Tinashe featuring Travis Scott.
- "Me So Bad" contains a sample of "Go Wild" performed by Ian Thomas.
- "Ooh La La" contains a sample of "Dilemma" performed by Nelly featuring Kelly Rowland and elements of "Some Cut" performed by Trillville.

== Personnel ==
Credits were adapted from Tidal.

Musicians

- Peter Lee Johnson – violin (track 2)
- Felix Snow – bass (track 8)
- Raymon "Big Play Ray" Holton – guitar (track 12)
- Matt Johnson – keyboards (track 13)

Technical

- Erik Madrid – mixing (tracks 1, 2, 4, 5, 7–10)
- Jaycen Joshua – mixing (tracks 3, 6, 11, 12)
- Mark Ralph – mixing (track 13)
- Drew Smith – engineering (track 13)
- Tom A.D. Fuller – engineering (track 13)
- William Binderup – engineering assistance (tracks 1, 2, 4, 5, 7–10)
- Maddox Chhim – engineering assistance (tracks 3, 11)
- David Nakaji – engineering assistance (tracks 3, 6, 11, 12)
- Ben Milchev – engineering assistance (tracks 6, 12)
- Chris Athens – mastering (tracks 3, 6, 11)
- Tinashe – recording (tracks 4, 9, 12)
- Miagi – recording (track 6)
- Felix Snow – recording (track 8)
- Soundz – recording (track 12)

== Charts ==
| Chart (2018) | Peak position |
|---|---|
| Australian Albums (ARIA) | 76 |
| Australian Urban Albums (ARIA) | 21 |
| Belgian Albums (Ultratop Flanders) | 134 |
| Canadian Albums (Billboard) | 55 |
| Dutch Albums (Album Top 100) | 103 |
| Japanese Download Albums (Billboard Japan) | 54 |
| New Zealand Heatseeker Albums (RMNZ) | 3 |
| South Korean Albums (Gaon) | 100 |
| UK Albums (Official Charts) | 78 |
| UK R&B Albums (Official Charts) | 6 |
| US Billboard 200 | 58 |
| US Top R&B/Hip-Hop Albums (Billboard) | 29 |

== Release history ==
| Region | Date | Format(s) | Label | Ref. |
|---|---|---|---|---|
| Various | April 13, 2018 | CD; digital download; streaming | RCA | |
| Japan | April 25, 2018 | CD; digital download; streaming | Sony Japan | |
| Various | June 29, 2018 | Vinyl | RCA | |
