= Faded Love (Tinashe song) =

Single by Tinashe featuring Future

from the album Joyride
- Released: February 12, 2018
- Genre: Electro-R&B; club
- Length: 3:24
- Label: RCA
- Songwriters: Tinashe Kachingwe; Nayvadius Wilburn; Alexandra Yatchenko; Jonnali Parmenius; Tor Erik Hermansen
- Producer: Stargate

Tinashe singles chronology
"No Drama" (2018)	"Faded Love" (2018)	"Me So Bad" (2018)

Future singles chronology
"King's Dead" (2018)	"Faded Love" (2018)	"Top Off" (2018)

"Faded Love" is a song recorded by American singer Tinashe featuring guest vocals from American rapper Future. It was written by Tinashe, Future, Sasha Alex Sloan, Noonie Bao, as well as Tor Erik Hermansen from the song's production team Stargate. It was released commercially for digital download via RCA Records on February 12, 2018, as the second single from Tinashe's third studio album, Joyride (2018).

== Background ==
The song was first revealed in a picture Tinashe posted on social media on January 12, 2018. She spoke of the song in an interview on Beats 1: "'Faded Love' is kind of more muted, it's a little bit more R&B, it's a little more sensual, mid-tempo." Talking about working with Future, she said: "Future's on my first album and that was one of my favorite songs on the first album, but I felt like it was pretty underrated. So I was like, 'It would be perfect to have him back again.' I thought this song was really an interesting song to put him on because it was a little more unexpected, a little bit more muted, and not necessarily like a trap music, or something that would be obvious. It's a kind of new flavor." In another interview with AOL, Tinashe said: "The song's vibe is just so special. It's this muted, almost careless tone. It has this darkness to it, which I love. I was really drawn to those elements and even how the instrumentation with its muted drums. To me, the song really represents that feeling of being indifferent to love."

== Critical reception ==
Madeline Roth of MTV News described the song as "promising", writing that it features "glitchy beat and murky synths". Sam Prance of the same publication praised the song, writing: "Future sounds amazing on it and it's Tinashe at her most captivating. It's more lowkey than 'No Drama' but no less hypnotic. Hugh McIntyre of Fuse deemed the song "a subdued affair", writing: "Both her delivery and the production mimic the name of the song". Comparing to Tinashe's previous single "No Drama" featuring Offset, which was also produced by Stargate, Eddie Fu of Consequence of Sound noted the song of being "more of a duet than a typical singer and rapper collaboration". Chris DeVille of Stereogum wrote: "The song benefits from some compelling electronics-infused production from Stargate and a contagious twilight mood." Mike Wass of Idolator regarded the song as "a return to the slinky hip-hop/pop fusion of Aquarius", which follows the trend started with "No Drama".

== Credits and personnel ==
Recording and management

- Mixed at Larrabee Sound Studios (North Hollywood, California)
- Mastered at Chris Athens Masters (Austin, Texas)
- Published by Shaybug Music/Sony/ATV Songs LLC (BMI), EMI April Music, Inc. (ASCAP) obo EMI Music Publishing Ltd. (PRS, EMI Music Publishing Scandinavia (BMI/STIM), Sasha Sloan Publishing/Mod Junkie/Warner-Tamerlane Publishing Corp. (BMI), Nayvadius Maximus Music/Irving Music, Inc. (BMI)
- Future appears courtesy of A1 Recordings/Epic Records.

Personnel

- Tinashe – lead vocals, composition
- Future – featured artist, composition
- Tor Erik Hermansen – composition, production, all instruments, programming
- Noonie Bao – composition
- Sasha Sloan – composition
- Mikkel S. Eriksen – production, all instruments, programming
- Jaycen Joshua – mixing
- David Nakaji – mixing assistant
- Ben Milchev – mixing assistant
- Chris Athens – mastering

Credits adapted from the liner notes of Joyride.

== Charts ==
Chart (2018)	Peak position
New Zealand Heatseekers (RMNZ)	10
US Hot R&B Songs (Billboard)	22
