= We Are the People (Martin Garrix song) =

Single by Martin Garrix featuring Bono and the Edge
- Released: 14 May 2021
- Genre: Progressive house, dance-rock
- Length: 3:37
- Label: STMPD RCRDS
- Composers: Martijn Garritsen; The Edge; Giorgio Tuinfort; Albin Nedler; Kristoffer Fogelmark
- Lyricists: Martijn Garritsen; Bono; Simon Carmody
- Producers: Martijn Garritsen; Giorgio Tuinfort

Martin Garrix singles chronology
"Pressure" (2021)	"We Are the People" (2021)	"Love Runs Out" (2021)

"We Are the People" is a song by Dutch DJ and record producer Martin Garrix, featuring Bono and the Edge from Irish rock band U2. It was officially released on 14 May 2021 as the official song for the UEFA Euro 2020. It was first performed in full at a virtual opening ceremony at the Stadio Olimpico in Rome.

== Composition ==
"Creating the music for one of the biggest sports events in the world together with Bono and the Edge has been an incredible experience. I’m very proud of what we did together and excited to finally share it with the world!"

— Martin Garrix about the song.

The song, written and produced by the artists themselves, was described as a "crossover dance-rock".

== Music video ==
The video of the song was filmed in London, England, and includes Bono and the Edge of Irish rock band U2. The video contains some footage from the group's performance at Slane Castle in 2001.

== UEFA Euro 2020 ==
On 19 October 2019, Garrix was announced as the official music artist of the tournament. He produced the official song of the tournament, as well as the walkout music preceding matches and the television broadcast music.

== Credits and personnel ==
- Martin Garrix – producer, lyrics, composer, arrangement
- The Edge – guitar, composer
- Bono – vocals, lyrics
- Simon Carmody – lyrics
- Giorgio Tuinfort – composer, arrangement, piano
- Albin Nedler – composer, background vocals
- Kristoffer Fogelmark – composer, background vocals
- Pierre-Luc Rioux – additional guitar
- Frank van Essen – strings

== Charts ==
=== Weekly charts ===
Weekly chart performance for "We Are the People"
Chart (2021)	Peak position
Austria (Ö3 Austria Top 40)	28
Belgium (Ultratop 50 Flanders)	6
Belgium (Ultratop 50 Wallonia)	5
CIS Airplay (TopHit)	78
Czech Republic Airplay (ČNS IFPI)	30
Czech Republic Singles Digital (ČNS IFPI)	72
El Salvador (Monitor Latino)	12
France (SNEP)	89
Germany (GfK)	15
Global 200 (Billboard)	147
Hungary (Rádiós Top 40)	4
Hungary (Single Top 40)	9
Iceland (Tónlistinn)	22
Ireland (IRMA)	74
Italy (FIMI)	36
Italy Airplay (EarOne)	1
Mexico Ingles Airplay (Billboard)	17
Netherlands (Dutch Top 40)	2
Netherlands (Single Top 100)	15
Poland Airplay (ZPAV)	5
Portugal (AFP)	62
Romania (Airplay 100)	33
Slovakia Airplay (ČNS IFPI)	21
Slovakia Singles Digital (ČNS IFPI)	79
Sweden (Sverigetopplistan)	47
Switzerland (Schweizer Hitparade)	14
US Adult Alternative Airplay (Billboard)	21
US Adult Pop Airplay (Billboard)	37
US Hot Dance/Electronic Songs (Billboard)	12

=== Monthly charts ===
Monthly chart performance for "We Are the People"
Chart (2021–2023)	Peak position
Czech Republic (Rádio – Top 100)	37
Czech Republic (Singles Digitál Top 100)	83
Romania Airplay (TopHit)	64
Slovakia (Rádio – Top 100)	30
Slovakia (Singles Digitál Top 100)	94

=== Year-end charts ===
Year-end chart performance for "We Are the People"
Chart (2021)	Position
Belgium (Ultratop Flanders)	63
Belgium (Ultratop Wallonia)	75
Hungary (Rádiós Top 40)	23
Hungary (Single Top 40)	80
Netherlands (Dutch Top 40)	32
Netherlands (Single Top 100)	94
Poland (ZPAV)	87
Switzerland (Schweizer Hitparade)	100
US Hot Dance/Electronic Songs (Billboard)	69

== Certifications ==
Certifications for "We Are the People"
Region	Certification	Certified units/sales
Austria (IFPI Austria)	Gold	15,000^{‡}
Belgium (BRMA)	Gold	20,000^{‡}
Brazil (Pro-Música Brasil)	Gold	20,000^{‡}
France (SNEP)	Gold	100,000^{‡}
Italy (FIMI)	Platinum	70,000^{‡}
^{‡} Sales+streaming figures based on certification alone.
