= Just Say =

Single by KDA featuring Tinashe
- Released: 15 July 2016
- Length: 3:52
- Label: Ministry of Sound
- Songwriter: Kris Di Angelis
- Producer: KDA

KDA singles chronology
"Turn the Music Louder (Rumble)" (2015)	"Just Say" (2016)	"Hate Me" (2017)

Tinashe singles chronology
"All My Friends" (2015)	"Just Say" (2016)	"Superlove" (2016)

Music video
- "Just Say" on YouTube

"Just Say" is a song produced by British DJ KDA, featuring vocals by American singer Tinashe. It was released on 15 July 2016 to digital outlets by Ministry of Sound.

== Music video ==
The song's music video, directed by Sarah McColgan, premiered on 25 October 2016. It features Tinashe dancing in various neon-lit spaces, including a parking lot, a motel room, an empty roadside diner and a phone booth. The Fader editor David Renshaw stated that the video "does not disappoint".

== Track listings ==
- Digital download
1. "Just Say" – 3:52
- Digital download (Remixes EP), Vol. 1
1. "Just Say" (KDA Dub) – 7:12
2. "Just Say" (Joshua James remix) – 6:40
3. "Just Say" (Ashley Beedle remix) – 8:14
4. "Just Say" (Kabuki remix) – 4:52
- Digital download (Cassius remix)
1. "Just Say" (Cassius remix) – 6:14
- Digital download (Faithless remix)
1. "Just Say" (Faithless remix) – 5:58

== Charts ==
Chart performance
Chart (2016–2017)	Peak position
Australian Dance Singles (ARIA)	41
Belgium (Ultratip Bubbling Under Flanders)	37
Bulgaria (PROPHON)	14
Scottish Singles Sales (Official Charts)	46
UK Singles (Official Charts)	88
US Dance Club Songs (Billboard)	15

== Certifications ==
Certifications for "Just Say"
Region	Certification	Certified units/sales
United Kingdom (BPI)	Silver	200,000^{‡}
^{‡} Sales+streaming figures based on certification alone.
