= Sasha Alex Sloan =

American singer-songwriter (born 1995)

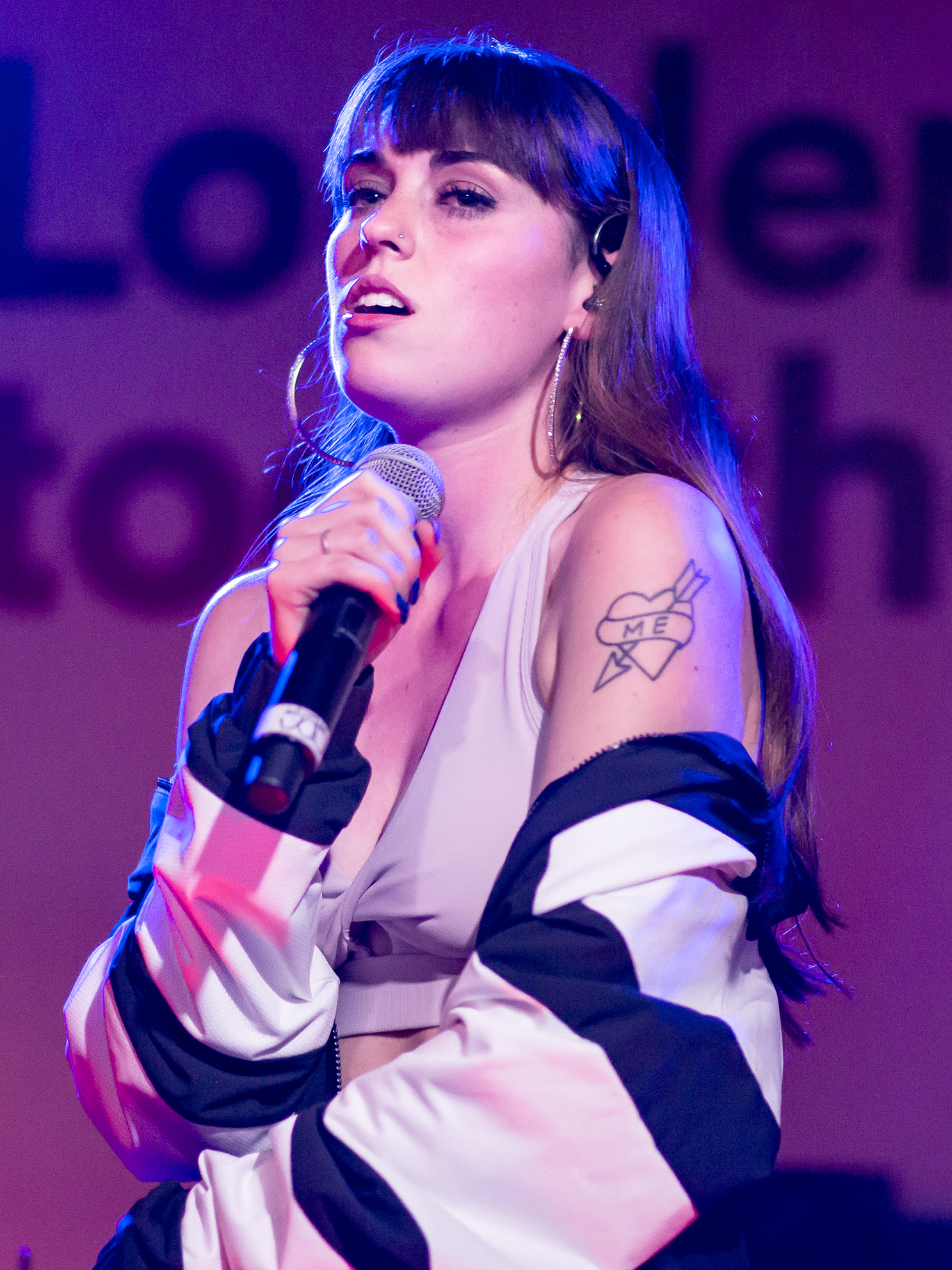
- Sloan performing in Los Angeles in 2018

Background information
- Also known as: Sasha Yatchenko, Sasha Sloan
- Born: Alexandra Artourovna Yatchenko; March 11, 1995 (age 31); Boston, Massachusetts, U.S.
- Occupations: Singer; songwriter
- Years active: 2015–present
- Labels: Good Times Recording; RCA
- Website: sadgirlsloan.com

Alexandra Artourovna Yatchenko (born March 11, 1995), better known as Sasha Alex Sloan or simply Sasha Sloan, is an American singer-songwriter. Sloan performs in the indie pop, alt pop, and the singer-songwriter genres. Her debut studio album, Only Child, was released in October 2020, and was met with critical acclaim by music critics, deeming it as a solid and outspoken debut album. Sloan's second studio album, I Blame the World, was released in May 2022, and after her departure from RCA Records in 2023, she independently released her third studio album, Me Again, in May 2024. In 2026, she released her fourth studio album, And The Crowd Goes Mild.

As a songwriter, Sloan has been credited on songs for artists such as Camila Cabello, Katy Perry, Charli XCX, Tinashe, Anne-Marie, Idina Menzel, Pink, JoJo, and Lecrae, among others. As a guest performer, she appeared on the singles "I'll Wait" by Kygo, "Love Runs Out" by Martin Garrix, and "Hero" by Alan Walker.

== Life ==
Alexandra Artourovna Yatchenko was born on March 11, 1995. She grew up in South Boston and taught herself to play on a piano her mother purchased when she was five. Sloan's paternal grandparents were natives of Siberia, Russia, and she spent summers on their farm there as a child. Her maternal grandparents were both born and grew up in South Boston. Sasha spent a lot of time with them in Maine.

After graduating from high school, she went on to study at the Berklee College of Music. When she got back home one day, she noticed that her parents had written the word "DORK" next to her room at their house. Sloan posted the photo on Reddit, which quickly became viral. Taking advantage of this opportunity, she pasted a link to her SoundCloud under the post. Later, she was approached by Warner Chappell Music to sign a publishing deal. Sloan was 19 years old at this point and following the deal, she moved to Los Angeles to pursue a career as a songwriter; she worked at a coffee shop to support herself. In 2024, she declared herself an atheist and a nihilist.

== Career ==
=== 2015–2018: Beginnings, Sad Girl, and Loser ===
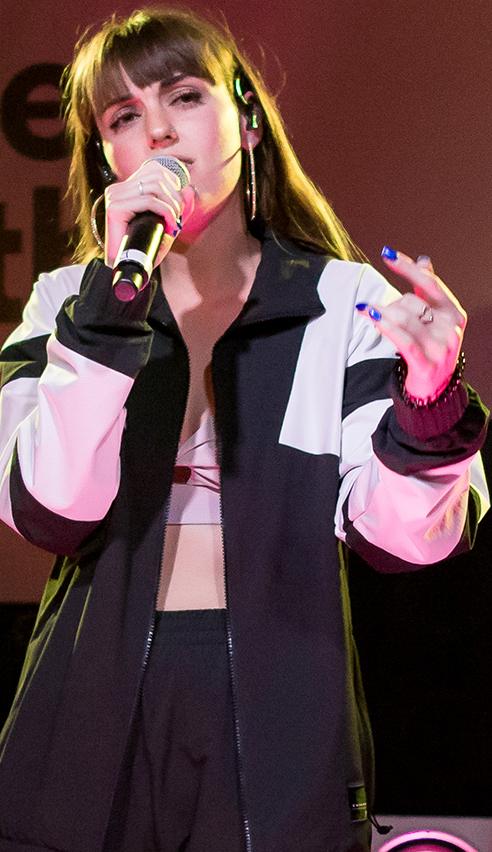
Sloan in 2018

In 2015, Sloan was featured in the song "Phoenix" by Kaskade, as well as being credited for songwriting. Sloan continued her career by writing for artists including Idina Menzel, Maggie Lindemann and Camila Cabello. In 2017, Sloan was featured in the song "This Town" by Kygo, which she also cowrote. Her debut EP, Sad Girl, was released by RCA on April 18, 2018. She co-wrote Juice WRLD's single "Black & White", which was released on May 23, 2018, and appeared on his debut studio album Goodbye & Good Riddance. Her second EP, Loser, was released by RCA on November 29, 2018. On the same day, she announced her first headlining tour to support the album. Her single "Older" from the album was performed on The Late Show with Stephen Colbert on February 6, 2019, her US national TV debut.

=== 2019–2022: Self-Portrait, Only Child and I Blame The World ===
Sloan released her third EP Self-Portrait on October 18, 2019. She stated that "this EP is more about being OK with the fact that I have a lot of anxiety, and that I don't want to go to parties." Self-Portrait played an important role in her music career by allowing her to unapologetically represent herself and create songs that her fans can connect and relate to; the EP deals with themes such as anxiety, depression, and uncertainty. On April 3, 2020, Sloan released the single "I'll Wait" produced by Kygo for his album Golden Hour. The following day, a music video was released starring American couple Rob Gronkowski and Camille Kostek containing personal footage of their life together.

On August 3, Sloan announced that her debut album Only Child would be released in the fall, with the lead single "Lie" released on August 7. On August 25 she released the song "House With No Mirrors" as the second single from her debut album. On August 28 she announced that her debut album Only Child would be released on October 16. On November 17, Sloan announced a collaboration with singer-songwriter Charlie Puth, a remix for her song "Is It Just Me?", which would be released on November 19, 2020. On April 22, 2021, Sasha teamed up with country superstar Sam Hunt to release an acoustic-driven song titled "when was it over?" that finds Hunt and Sloan in a post-breakup state of misery questioning the cause of their respective romantic splits. Sloan said that the track is about not being able to let go of someone even when you know there's nothing left. The song was co-written with Shane McAnally who came up with the song's title. Other co-writers include King Henry and Emi Dragoi.

On May 13, 2022, Sloan released her second studio album I Blame The World. During her interview with Billboard, she described what she perceives to be the biggest difference between Only Child and I Blame The World: "I would say Only Child was a collection of songs I really liked but there wasn't a cohesive theme. With I Blame The World, I made a conscious effort to create a world in which all the songs made sense together."

=== 2023–present: Going independent and Me Again ===
On March 27, 2023, Sloan announced on her socials that she is now an independent artist; confirming her departure from major label RCA Records. Sloan was part of the lineup for the 22nd Coachella Valley Music and Arts Festival in April 2023. In 2024, Sloan participated in season 5 of the Chinese variety show, Sisters Who Make Waves, however she dropped out due to health issues. On May 17, Sloan dropped another album, Me Again since she went independent. The album contains 13 songs, with only one collaboration on the song "Falling Out Of Like" with Ruston Kelly. Some other songs are "Highlights", the lead single, and "Good Enough," the only song on the album she wrote herself when she was sixteen.

On July 31, 2026, Sloan released "Glitter". On October 23, 2026, Sloan will release her fourth studio album, And the Crowd Goes Mild.

== Discography ==
=== Studio albums ===
Sasha Alex Sloan released her debut album, Only Child, in 2020.

In 2022, she released I Blame The World

Then, in 2024, she independently released Me Again.

Her latest album, And The Crowd Goes Mild, was released on October 23

=== Extended plays ===
Title	Details
Sad Girl	Released: April 18, 2018; Label: RCA; Formats: Digital download, streaming
Loser	Released: November 29, 2018; Label: RCA; Formats: Digital download, streaming
Self Portrait	Released: October 18, 2019; Label: RCA; Formats: Digital download, streaming

=== Singles ===
==== As lead artist ====
List of singles as lead artist, with selected chart positions and certifications, showing year released and album name
Title	Year	Peak chart positions					Certifications	Album
Title	Year	US Bub.	GER	NOR	NZ Hot	SWE	Certifications	Album
"Ready Yet"	2017	—	—	—	—	—		Sad Girl
"Runaway"	2017	—	—	—	—	—		Sad Girl
"Normal"	2018	—	—	—	—	—		Sad Girl
"Fall"	2018	—	—	—	—	—		Sad Girl
"Ready Yet" (San Holo Remix)	2018	—	—	—	—	—		Non-album single
"Hurt"	2018	—	—	—	—	—		Sad Girl
"Here"	2018	—	—	—	—	—		Sad Girl
"The Only"	2018	—	—	—	—	—		Loser
"Faking It"	2018	—	—	—	—	—		Loser
"Chasing Parties"	2018	—	—	—	—	—		Loser
"Older"	2018	—	—	—	—	—	RIAA: Gold; ARIA: Gold	Loser
"Thoughts"	2019	—	—	—	—	—		Self Portrait
"Dancing with Your Ghost"	2019	—	—	—	—	—	RIAA: Gold; ARIA: Platinum	Self Portrait
"At Least I Look Cool"	2019	—	—	—	31	—		Self Portrait
"Smiling When I Die"	2019	—	—	—	38	—		Self Portrait
"I'll Wait" (with Kygo)	2020	7	89	9	—	28	MC: Platinum	Golden Hour
"Lie"	2020	—	—	—	—	—		Only Child
"House with No Mirrors"	2020	—	—	—	—	—		Only Child
"Is It Just Me?" (solo or featuring Charlie Puth)	2020	—	—	—	—	—		Only Child
"Hypochondriac"	2020	—	—	—	—	—		Only Child
"When Was It Over?" (featuring Sam Hunt)	2021	—	—	—	8	—	MC: Gold	Non-album single
"Barcelona" (with Winnetka Bowling League)	2021	—	—	—	—	—		Pulp
"WTF"	2022	—	—	—	—	—		I Blame the World
"I Blame the World"	2022	—	—	—	—	—		I Blame the World
"New Normal"	2022	—	—	—	—	—		I Blame the World
"Adult"	2022	—	—	—	—	—		I Blame the World
"Highlights"	2024	—	—	—	—	—		Me Again
"Me Again"	2024	—	—	—	—	—		Me Again
"Rest" (with Dean Lewis)	2024	—	—	—	—	—		The Epilogue
"Glitter"	2026	—	—	—	—	—		
"Empty"	2026	—	—	—	—	—		
"—" denotes a recording that did not chart or was not released.

==== As featured artist ====
List of singles as featured artist, showing year released and album name
Title	Year	Peak chart positions		Album
Title	Year	NZ Hot	SWE Heat.	Album
"Falls" (Odesza featuring Sasha Alex Sloan)	2017	—	—	A Moment Apart
"Love Runs Out" (Martin Garrix featuring G-Eazy and Sasha Alex Sloan)	2021	14	1	Non-album single
"Hero" (Alan Walker featuring Sasha Alex Sloan)	2023	—	—	Walkerworld
"What Have They Done to Us" (Mako and Grey featuring Sasha Alex Sloan)	2024	—	—	Arcane League of Legends: Season 2: Extended edition
"Without You" (Gryffin and AVELLO featuring Sasha Alex Sloan)	2026	_	_	Non-album Single

=== Other charted or certified songs ===
Title	Year	Peak chart positions	Certifications	Album
Title	Year	NZ Hot	Certifications	Album
"Only" (with NF)	2019	26	RIAA: Gold	The Search

=== Songwriting credits ===
Title	Year	Artist(s)	Album	Credits	Written with
"Phoenix" (featuring Sasha Sloan)	2015	Kaskade	Automatic	Featured artist/Co-writer	Ryan Raddon, Finn Bjarnson, Cody Tarpely, Jarrod Gorbel
"Last Time"	2016	Idina Menzel	Idina	Co-writer	Idina Menzel, Eric Rosse
"I Do"	2016	Idina Menzel	Idina	Co-writer	Idina Menzel, Eric Rosse
"Pretty Girl"	2016	Maggie Lindemann	Non-album single	Co-writer	Maggie Lindemann, Sean Myer
"Just Hold On" (with Louis Tomlinson)	2016	Steve Aoki	Neon Future III	Co-writer	Steven Aoki, Louis Tomlinson, Nolan Lambroza, Eric Rosse
"I Miss You" (featuring Bahari)	2017	Grey	Non-album single	Co-writer	Michael Trewartha, Thomas Meredith, Kyle Trewartha
"Guide Me" (featuring Sasha Sloan)	2017	Deorro	Good Evening	Featured artist/Co-writer	Eric Orrosquieta
"Nobody"	2017	Niia	I	Co-writer	Niia Bertino, Simon Wilcox, Robin Hannibal
"Girl Like Me"	2017	Niia	I	Co-writer	Niia Bertino, Robin Hannibal
"I'll Find You" (featuring Tori Kelly)	2017	Lecrae	All Things Work Together	Co-writer	Lecrae Moore, Justin Franks, Jonathan Mitchell, Daniel Majic, Natalie Sims, Victoria Kelly
"OMG" (featuring Quavo)	2017	Camila Cabello	Non-album single	Co-writer	Camila Cabello, Charlotte Aitchison, Mikkel Eriksen, Tor Hermansen, Jonnali Parmenius, Quavious Marshall
"Falls" (featuring Sasha Sloan)	2017	Odesza	A Moment Apart	Featured artist/Co-writer	Clayton Knight, Harrison Mills, Jonnali Parmenius, Alexandra Cheatle
"Phases" (with French Montana)	2017	Alma	Non-album single	Co-writer	Alma-Sofia Miettinen, Charlotte Aitchison, Jonnali Parmenius, Charlie Handsome
"This Town" (featuring Sasha Sloan)	2017	Kygo	Stargazing	Featured artist/Co-writer	Kyrre Gorvell-Dahll, Jonnali Parmenius
"I'll Be There" (featuring Sasha Sloan)	2017	King Henry	For You EP	Featured artist/Co-writer	Henry Allen
"Never Be the Same"	2017	Camila Cabello	Camila	Co-writer	Camila Cabello, Adam Feeney, Leo Rami Dawood, Jacob Ludwig Olofsson, Jonnali Parmenius
"Track 10"	2017	Charli XCX	Pop 2	Co-writer	Charlotte Aitchison, Mikkel Eriksen, Jonnali Parmenius, Alexander Guy Cook, Tor Hermansen
"Perfect" (with Ally Brooke)	2018	Topic	Non-album single	Co-writer	Matthew Radosevich, Jonnali Parmenius
"Faded Love" (featuring Future)	2018	Tinashe	Joyride	Co-writer	Tinashe Kachingwe, Jonnali Parmenius, Mikkel Eriksen, Tor Hermansen, Nayvadius Wilburn
"A Good Night" (featuring BloodPop)	2018	John Legend	TBA	Co-writer	John Stephens, Michael Tucker, Rachel Keen
"Bad Girlfriend"	2018	Anne-Marie	Speak Your Mind	Co-writer	Anne-Marie Nicholson, Paul Blair, Nicholas Monson, Mark Nilan Jr.
"Messy"	2018	Kiiara	Lil Kiiwi	Co-writer	Kiara Saulters, Noah Conrad, Rowland Speckley, Jake Torrey
"Low Key in Love"	2018	Jaira Burns	Burn Slow EP	Co-writer	Jaira Burns, Aaron Kleinstub, Ryan Tedder
"Be Right Here" (with Stargate featuring GOLDN)	2018	Kungs	TBA	Co-writer	Valentin Brunel, Mikkel Eriksen, Tor Hermansen, Robert "Throttle" Bergin, Charlotte Aitchison, Camila Cabello, Jonnali Parmenius
"This Time Around"	2018	Jaira Burns	Burn Slow EP	Co-writer	Mikkel Eriksen, Nolan Lambroza
"Thick ssinand Thin"	2018	LANY	Malibu Nights	Co-writer	Paul Jason Klein, Jacob Goss, Henry Allen
"I Don't Wanna Love You Anymore"	2018	LANY	Malibu Nights	Co-writer	Paul Jason Klein, Jacob Goss, Nolan Lambroza
"Thru These Tears"	2018	LANY	Malibu Nights	Co-writer	
"Curiosity"	2018	Nao	Saturn	Co-writer	Neo Jessica Joshua, Daniel Traynor, Henry Allen, Yvette "Naala" Riby—Williams
"Happy"	2019	Pink	Hurts 2B Human	Co-writer	Pink, Teddy Geiger, Steph Jones
"Blame It on Your Love" (featuring Lizzo)	2019	Charli XCX	Charli	Co-writer	Charlotte Aitchison, Mikkel Eriksen, Jonnali Parmenius, Tor Hermansen, Finn Keane, Melissa Jefferson
"Cry About It Later"	2020	Katy Perry	Smile	Co-writer	Katy Perry, Jonnali Parmenius, Oscar Holter
"So Sick" (featuring blackbear)	2020	Kiiara	Lil Kiiwi	Co-writer	Kiara Saulters, Henry Agincourt Allen, Johnny Mitchell, Mathew Tyler Musto
"Creature of Habit"	2021	JoJo	TBA	Co-writer	Emmanuel Nickerson, Morten Ristorp, Justin Tranter
"U & Me"	2021	Illenium	Fallen Embers	Co-writer	Illenium
"Not Cute Anymore"	2025	Illit	Not Cute Anymore	Co-writer	Jasper Harris, Youra
"Love, Older You"	2026	Illit	Mamihlapinatapai	Co-writer	Shinkung, Dyvahh, Vincenzo, Henry Allen, Moon Yeo-ruem (Jamfactory), Jang Jeong-won (Jamfactory), Yunah, Minju, Moka, Wonhee, Iroha
"Switchblade" (feat. Ty Dolla $ign)	2026	Aespa	Lemonade	Co-writer	Danke, Joowon, Tyron Griffin, Jr., Ant Clemons, Evan Blair, Megan Bülow, David Charles Fischer
"What's Wrong with Me" (with Robert Smith)	2026	Olivia Rodrigo	You Seem Pretty Sad for a Girl So in Love	Co-writer	Olivia Rodrigo, Daniel Nigro
"Sorry I'm Obsessed With You"	2026	Chelsea Cutler	Is This The End?	Co-writer	Chelsea Cutler, Andrew Wells, Lily Kaplan
"Hate Myself For Loving You"	2026	Isabel LaRosa	Promising Young Woman	Co-writer	Isabel LaRosa, Thomas LaRosa, Kevin Hickey
"Still"	2026	Karol G	No Me Arrepiento de Sentir Tanto	Co-writer	Carolina Giraldo Navarro, Peter Hernandez, Isabel LaRosa, Thomas LaRosa
"Can You Show Me?"	2026	Chelsea Cutler	Is This The End?	Co-writer	Chelsea Cutler, Andrew Wells, Charley Bagnall, Lily Kaplan
"The Car Ride Home"	2026	Chelsea Cutler	Is This The End?	Co-writer	Chelsea Cutler, Andrew Wells, Charley Bagnall, Lily Kaplan
"Super in Love"	2026	Illit	Break Even	Co-writer	Annika Bennett, "Hitman" Bang, Ellie, Frants, Tehya, Lawzy, Henry Allen, Jasper Harris, Mia (153/Joombas), Danke, Leekyung, Belift Lab Inc., Kim Su-ji (Lalala Studio), Liljune, Shinkung, Sohlhee, Moon Seolwool (Mumw)
"Tell Me How It Feels"	2026	XO	Need to Know	Co-writer	Summer Askew, Shali Bordoni, Zoe Miller, Emmy Statham, Reanna Sujeewon, Maegan Cottone, Mike Green, Marlhy Murphy, Rick Parkhouse, Annika Rose, George Tizzard, Josh Wilkinson

== Tour ==
Headlining:

- Let's Get Sad Tour (2019-2020)
- I Blame The World Tour (2022-2023)
- Me Again Tour (2024-2025)
- An Evening With Sasha Alex Sloan: And The Crowd Goes Mild Tour (2026)

As An Opening Act:

- Kelsea Ballerini, Kelsea Ballerini: Live On Tour (2025)
- Dermont Kennedy, The Sonder Tour (2023)

List of dates and countries
Date	Place	Country	Venue
February 10, 2018	Las Vegas, Nevada	United States	The Bunkhouse
February 11, 2018	Phoenix, Arizona	United States	Crescent Ballroom
February 13, 2018	West Hollywood, California	United States	The Roxy Theatre
February 15, 2018	Santa Ana, California	United States	Constellation Room
February 16, 2018	San Francisco, California	United States	Swedish American Hall
February 18, 2018	Seattle, Washington	United States	The Crocodile
February 20, 2018	Salt Lake City, Utah	United States	Urban Lounge
February 21, 2018	Denver, Colorado	United States	Globe Hall
February 22, 2018	Denver, Colorado	United States	Globe Hall
February 24, 2018	Austin, Texas	United States	The Parish
February 25, 2018	New Orleans, Louisiana	United States	Gasa Gasa
February 27, 2018	Atlanta, Georgia	United States	Terminal West
February 28, 2018	Nashville, Tennessee	United States	The Basement East
March 2, 2018	Carrboro, North Carolina	United States	Cat's Cradle
March 3, 2018	Washington	United States	U Street Music Hall
March 6, 2018	Toronto, Ontario	Canada	Adelaide Hall
March 7, 2018	Buffalo, New York	United States	Town Ballroom
