= Love Runs Out (Martin Garrix song) =

2021 song by Martin Garrix

Single by Martin Garrix featuring G-Eazy and Sasha Alex Sloan
- Released: 6 August 2021
- Genre: Hip-hop; crossover-pop
- Length: 2:44
- Label: Stmpd; Epic Amsterdam
- Songwriters: Alex Hope; Chloe Angelides; Gerald Gillum; Martijn Garritsen; Oskar Rindborg; Sasha Alex Sloan
- Producers: Martin Garrix; Alex Hope; Osrin; Tom Martin

Martin Garrix singles chronology
"We Are the People" (2021)	"Love Runs Out" (2021)	"Diamonds" (2021)

G-Eazy singles chronology
"Running Wild (Tumblr Girls 2)" (2021)	"Love Runs Out" (2021)	"Breakdown" (2021)

Sasha Alex Sloan singles chronology
"U & Me" (2021)	"Love Runs Out" (2021)	"WTF" (2022)

Music video
- "Love Runs Out" on YouTube

"Love Runs Out" is a song recorded by Dutch DJ and record producer Martin Garrix, featuring American rapper G-Eazy and American singer-songwriter Sasha Alex Sloan. The song was released on 6 August 2021 via Stmpd Rcrds and Epic Records.

== Background ==
Garrix post a message on Instagram, announced the track was released on 6 August 2021, then he liked a comment on Martin Garrix Hub’s Instagram, the collaboration with G-Eazy and Sloan was revealed.

== Content ==
"Love Runs Out" describes an "afraid love story will fade out at one point" between G-Eazy and Sloan, then try to fix the relationship after they fall out of love.

== Critical reception ==
Jason Heffler of edm.com commented the track "is a scintillating hip-pop anthem with enough horsepower in its liner notes to propel it."

== Credits and personnel ==
Credits adapted from Tidal.

- Alex Hope – producer, composer, lyricist
- Martin Garrix – producer, composer, lyricist, associated performer, mastering engineer, mixing engineer
- Osrin – producer
- Tom Martin – producer
- Chloe Angelides – composer, lyricist
- G-Easy – composer, lyricist
- Oskar Rindborg – composer, lyricist
- Sasha Alex Sloan – composer, lyricist, associated performer
- Peppe Folliero – mastering engineer, mixing engineer
- Frank van Essen – Strings

== Charts ==
Chart performance for "Love Runs Out"
Chart (2021)	Peak position
Czech Republic Airplay (ČNS IFPI)	29
Germany (GfK)	89
Netherlands (Single Tip)	1
New Zealand Hot Singles (RMNZ)	14
Sweden Heatseeker (Sverigetopplistan)	1
Switzerland (Schweizer Hitparade)	77
US Hot Dance/Electronic Songs (Billboard)	10

== Release history ==
Release history for "Love Runs Out"
Region	Date	Format	Label	Ref.
Various	6 August 2021	Digital download; streaming	Stmpd; Epic Amsterdam	
