= Loser (EP) =

2018 EP by Sasha Alex Sloan

EP by Sasha Alex Sloan
- Released: November 29, 2018
- Length: 18:21
- Label: RCA
- Producer: King Henry; Emile Haynie; Emi Dragoi

Sasha Alex Sloan chronology
Sad Girl (2018)	Loser (2018)	Self Portrait (2019)

Singles from Loser
- 1. "The Only" Released: September 6, 2018; 2. "Faking It" Released: September 27, 2018; 3. "Chasing Parties" Released: October 18, 2018; 4. "Older" Released: November 9, 2018

Loser is the second extended play (EP) by American singer-songwriter Sasha Alex Sloan. The EP was released by label RCA Records on November 29, 2018. The EP was primarily produced by American record producer King Henry, with additional production from musicians Emile Haynie and Emi Dragoi. The EP follows Sloan's debut EP, Sad Girl, released in April 2018. Additionally, Sloan performed the track "Older" on The Late Show with Stephen Colbert in February 2019.

== Track listing ==
No.	Title	Writer(s)	Producer(s)	Length
1.	"The Only"	Alexandra Yatchenko; Henry Agincourt Allen	King Henry	3:33
2.	"Faking It"	Yatchenko; Allen	King Henry	2:47
3.	"Older"	Yatchenko; Jake Greene; Allen; Daniel Silberstein	King Henry	3:04
4.	"Version of Me"	Yatchenko; Jake Greene; Allen; Sarah Hudson; Emi Dragoi	King Henry; Dragoi	3:01
5.	"Chasing Parties"	Yatchenko; Allen	King Henry	2:42
6.	"Again"	Yatchenko; Allen; Jake Greene; Dragoi	King Henry; Emile Haynie	3:14
Total length:				18:21
