= I Blame the World =

Studio album by Sasha Alex Sloan
- Released: May 13, 2022
- Length: 32:00
- Label: RCA
- Producers: King Henry; Stuart Price; Chad Copelin; Mike Elizondo; Taylor Wilzbach

Sasha Alex Sloan chronology
Only Child (2020)	I Blame the World (2022)	Me Again (2024)

Singles from I Blame the World
- 1. "WTF" Released: March 18, 2022; 2. "I Blame the World" Released: April 8, 2022; 3. "New Normal" Released: April 29, 2022; 4. "Adult" Released: May 11, 2022

I Blame the World is the second studio album by American singer and songwriter Sasha Alex Sloan. It was released on May 13, 2022, by RCA Records.

In promotion of the album, Sloan performed "I Blame the World" on Jimmy Kimmel Live! on April 26, 2022. In May 2022, Sloan supported American band LANY on their Australia and New Zealand tour. Sloan also embarked on a solo US tour, beginning on July 21, 2022 at First Avenue in Minneapolis, and concluding on September 10, 2022 in Nashville, Tennessee.

== Making of the album ==
Sloan attributes the cynic and hopeless attitude of her songs on her latest album to a product of the pandemic. She admits that she "couldn't write about anything else," in the midst of a global crisis. Sloan recalls being happy in her relationship at the time but still feeling depressed. Her feelings of depression inspired the making of I Blame the World, but she admits that she was scared to write about her depression. She justified her existential lyrics by saying that "people write whole albums about breakups, I can write a whole album about being depressed.". She categorizes her album as “honest” and “non-hopeful”. At the time of writing, she says she didn’t enjoy music and felt that the album wasn’t good enough. She feels most inspired when she is having authentic experiences and meeting new people, which was hardly the case during COVID-19. Also, I Blame the World was inspired by Sloan's interest in Netflix's film Don't Look Up and Apple TV's Severance. Both exhibit themes of brutal realism, loss of control, and hopelessness.

== Track listing ==
All songs are written by Sasha Alex Sloan (Alexandra Yatchenko) and King Henry, unless stated otherwise.

No.	Title	Writer(s)	Producer(s)	Length
1.	"Intro"	Alexandra Yatchenko		0:45
2.	"I Blame the World"		King Henry; Stuart Price; Chad Copelin	3:17
3.	"Adult"		King Henry; Price	3:04
4.	"Live Laugh Love"		King Henry; Copelin	3:02
5.	"Thank You"		King Henry; Taylor Wilzbach	3:10
6.	"WTF"		King Henry; Mike Elizondo	3:02
7.	"New Normal"		King Henry; Copelin	3:07
8.	"Global Warming"		King Henry; Elizondo	3:00
9.	"I H8 Myself"		King Henry	2:48
10.	"One Trick Phony"		King Henry	3:03
11.	"Hardest Thing"		King Henry; Copelin	3:42
Total length:				32:00
