= Sad Girl (EP) =

2018 EP by Sasha Sloan

EP by Sasha Alex Sloan
- Released: April 18, 2018
- Length: 18:55
- Label: RCA
- Producer: King Henry; Lotus IV; Martin Doherty; Nico Hartikainen; Noah Conrad

Sasha Alex Sloan chronology
Sad Girl (2018)	Loser (2018)

Singles from Sad Girl
- 1. "Ready Yet" Released: October 27, 2017; 2. "Runway" Released: December 1, 2017; 3. "Normal" / "Fall" Released: February 2, 2018; 4. "Hurt" / "Here" Released: March 16, 2018

Sad Girl (stylized in letter case) is the debut extended play (EP) by American singer-songwriter Sasha Alex Sloan. The EP was released by label RCA Records on April 18, 2018. Sad Girl features production collaborations with musicians such as King Henry, Lotus IV, and Martin Doherty of Scottish band Chvrches. The EP's lead single, "Ready Yet", was released on October 27, 2017.

== Track listing ==
No.	Title	Writer(s)	Producer(s)	Length
1.	"Normal"	Alexandra Yatchenko; Iain Cook; Martin Doherty; Henry Agincourt Allen	King Henry	3:11
2.	"Fall"	Yatchenko; Jonnali Parmenius; Linus Wiklund	Lotus IV	2:46
3.	"Ready Yet"	Yatchenko; Allen	King Henry	3:44
4.	"Hurt"	Yatchenko; Allen	King Henry	2:58
5.	"Runaway"	Yatchenko; Doherty; Nico Hartikainen	Doherty; Hartikainen; Noah Conrad	3:37
6.	"Here"	Yatchenko; Allen	King Henry	2:39
Total length:				18:55
