= No Drama (Tinashe song) =

Single by Tinashe featuring Offset

from the album Joyride
- Released: January 18, 2018
- Recorded: 2017
- Genre: Electro-R&B; trap
- Length: 3:20
- Label: RCA
- Songwriters: Tinashe Kachingwe; Kiari Cephus; Mikkel Storleer Eriksen; Tor Erik Hermansen
- Producer: Stargate

Tinashe singles chronology
"Flame" (2017)	"No Drama" (2018)	"Faded Love" (2018)

Offset singles chronology
"Patek Water" (2017)	"No Drama" (2018)	"Wait" (2018)

Music video
- "No Drama" on YouTube

"No Drama" is a song recorded by American singer Tinashe featuring guest vocals from American rapper Offset. It was released commercially for digital download via RCA Records on January 18, 2018, as the lead single from Tinashe's third studio album, Joyride (2018).

== Background ==
The song was first revealed in a picture Tinashe posted on social media on January 12, 2018.

== Critical reception ==
Jon Blistein of Rolling Stone described the song as "brash", writing that it features "heavy bass and light-yet-sinister synths and crisp percussion". Rania Aniftos of Billboard mentioned that the song is "powerful" and "glamorous". Mike Nied of Idolator stated: "The track signifies a retreat to more comfortable ground after searching for crossover appeal with saccharine releases like "Player," "Superlove" and "Flame." Instead, Tinashe hops on a fierce production to drop some brag-heavy verses."

== Live performances ==
Tinashe performed No Drama on Good Morning America on April 6, 2018 and the Tonight Show Starring Jimmy Fallon on April 12, 2018.

== Credits and personnel ==
Adapted from Tidal.

- Tinashe – lead vocals, songwriting
- Stargate – songwriting, production
- Offset – songwriting
- Jaycen Joshua – mixing engineering
- Maddox Chhim – engineering assistant
- Dave Nakaji – engineering assistant
- Chris Athens – mastering

== Charts ==
Chart (2018)	Peak position
Australian Urban Singles (ARIA)	39
Belgium (Ultratip Bubbling Under Flanders)	43
Belgian Urban (Ultratop)	36
New Zealand Heatseekers (RMNZ)	8
UK Video Streaming (OCC)	97
US Bubbling Under Hot 100 (Billboard)	23
US Bubbling Under R&B/Hip-Hop Songs (Billboard)	2
US Hot R&B Songs (Billboard)	9
US Rhythmic Airplay (Billboard)	24
