= Company (Tinashe song) =

Single by Tinashe

from the album Nightride
- Released: September 16, 2016
- Genre: Electro-R&B
- Length: 3:41 (single version); 4:25 (album version)
- Label: RCA
- Songwriter: Terius Nash
- Producers: The-Dream; Tricky Stewart

Tinashe singles chronology
"Superlove" (2016)	"Company" (2016)	"Slumber Party" (remix) (2016)

Music video
- "Company" on YouTube

"Company" is a song by American singer Tinashe for her second studio album, Nightride. It was released by RCA Records on September 16, 2016. The song was written by American R&B producer the-Dream, and produced by the-Dream and Tricky Stewart. Following her previous single "Superlove", Tinashe had teased "Company" through her Facebook page and performed it in MTV Wonderland program with "Superlove". After releasing Muna remix version of "Company" on December 9, Tinashe released the music video for the original song on January 6, 2017. Commercially, "Company" peaked at number 45 on Billboard's R&B/Hip-Hop Digital Songs chart.

== Release and promotion ==
After the release of her previous single "Superlove" on July 15, 2016, Tinashe started to tease her new song, titled "Company", through her Facebook page featuring a mysterious video. On September 15, Tinashe performed the song alongside "Superlove", on MTV's Wonderland program. The song was also performed at Audience Network on February 24, 2017, including the additional songs such as "Party Favors" and "All Hands on Deck".

== Composition ==
"Company"
The 25-second sample of "Company", an electro-R&B song which is "ready to snap from sexual tension"

Produced by the-Dream and Tricky Stewart, "Company" is an "electro-R&B banger", "slow-burning" song that embraces the "no strings attached mentality". On the hook, she sings "I don't need the lovin', nope / So don't make this somethin'", with the lyrics such as "See, I'm nothin' like a girlfriend, no / I'm not like someone I'm supposed to be / And I just want some company, company". Unlike the "romantic vibes" from her previous single "Superlove", "Company" is "ready to snap from sexual tension".

== Critical reception ==
Complex editor Chris Mench stated that the song "is a fun, slinky track", finding Tinashe "pining for someone to kick it with". Danny Schwartz of HotNewHipHop described the song as if Tinashe were "taking applicants for a no-strings-attached situation that literally millions of young men would be more than happy to fill". However, Schwartz continued that "despite her lack of a companion", the sexual tension on the track was described as "somehow through the roof". Vulture's Halle Kiefer noted that while the song is "too late to be a song-of-the-summer contender like 'Superlove'", it is "right on time for those last gasps of freedom".

Idolator included "Company" on their list of the best songs of 2016, ranking it at number 16.

== Music video ==
The song's accompanying music video, directed by Jack Begert, premiered on January 6, 2017, via Tinashe's YouTube channel. According to Exclaim, the video follows her and Britney Spears' song, "Slumber Party" video. In the video, Tinashe "hypnotizes us with her sexy body", singing about "a man she doesn't love". She then offers a "non-stop, high-energy choreography routine atop a lit-up glass floor, in front of a constantly changing backdrop". Billboard called the video as "choreographic perfection", while Vulture's Halle Kiefer noted that the music video contains "many layers", and parts of them "seem to be old bedsheets, presumably ruined to a Tinashe soundtrack". Noted as "worth the wait" by Los Angeles Times, Darryl Robertson of Vibe described it as "a stylish and engrossing" video.

== Personnel ==
Credits were adapted from Tidal.

- Tinashe – associated performer
- Terius "The-Dream" Nash – producer, composer, lyricist, background vocals, keyboards, programming
- Mischke – recording engineer, vocal producer
- Nathaniel Alford – recording engineer
- Jaycen Joshua – mixing engineer
- Dave Nakaji – assistant engineer
- Fletcher Vaughn – assistant engineer
- Jeremy Brown – assistant engineer
- Maddox Chhim – assistant engineer
- William Lovely – assistant engineer

== Charts ==
Chart (2016)	Peak position
UK Video Streaming (OCC)	86
US R&B/Hip-Hop Digital Songs (Billboard)	45

== Release history ==
Country	Date	Format	Version	Label	Ref.
Worldwide	September 16, 2016	Digital download; streaming	Original	RCA	
Worldwide	December 9, 2016	Digital download; streaming	Muna remix	RCA	
