= Superlove (Tinashe song) =

2016 single by Tinashe

Single by Tinashe
- Released: July 15, 2016
- Genre: Electropop; Miami bass
- Length: 3:07
- Label: RCA
- Songwriters: Tinashe Kachingwe; Christopher Stewart; Terius Nash
- Producers: Tricky Stewart; The-Dream

Tinashe singles chronology
"Just Say" (2016)	"Superlove" (2016)	"Company" (2016)

Music video
- "Superlove" on YouTube

"Superlove" is a song recorded by American singer Tinashe. The song was released by RCA Records on July 15, 2016, and later included on the Japanese edition of her third studio album, Joyride (2018). It was co-written and produced by Tricky Stewart and the-Dream.

== Background ==
After the release of "Energy" with Juicy J and "Party Favors" with Young Thug, Tinashe described "Superlove" as a "celebration of happiness", further stating that the song "celebrates the kind of happiness that is so immense and infectious, that you can't help but to rejoice in it." She concluded her statement, saying, "I hope to eulogize this wonderful energy and make people feel good, love harder, and dance together."

== Composition ==
Produced by the-Dream and Tricky Stewart, "Superlove" is an electropop and Miami bass song inspired by the 1980s and 1990s era. MTV's Madeline Roth found similarities between the song and Nicki Minaj's "Super Bass", calling the latter "a poppier cousin". while Ben Dandridge-Lemco of The Fader compared it to Ghost Town DJ's "My Boo".

== Critical reception ==
Jessie Morris of Complex deemed the song "an easy contender for a summer smash with its breezy, free-flowing chords made all the sweeter by that incredible voice of Tinashe". Rolling Stone's Brittany Spanos called it "bouncy" and "bubbly". Adelle Platon of Billboard found the song "infectious". In addition, the publication ranked "Superlove" at number 72 on their 100 Best Pop Songs of 2016 in December 12, 2016 and enlisted the song at 20 Sadly Underrated Pop Songs from 2016 on December 29; stating it as "unjustly ignored single".

== Music video ==
The music video premiered on August 12, 2016, it was filmed in Malibu, California, and directed by Hannah Lux Davis. The choreography was by Tinashe's longtime collaborator JaQuel Knight.

=== Reception ===
Collin Robinson from Stereogum summarized the video as a "sun-kissed beach clip with Tinashe and a group of bikini-clad 'Bae Watch' lifeguards rescuing hot dudes from drowning before they hit some sultry choreography on vintage beach towels". Danny Schwartz of HotNewHipHop described the video as the "greatest thing since sliced bread".

== Track listing ==
Digital download

1. "Superlove" (clean version) – 3:04

Digital download

1. "Superlove" (explicit version) – 3:04

The Remixes

1. "Superlove" (Shift K3Y remix) – 4:14
2. "Superlove" (The Golden Pony remix) – 3:22
3. "Superlove" (Frank Pole remix) – 3:59
4. "Superlove" (FTampa remix) – 2:58
5. "Superlove" (Cutmore remix) – 3:38
6. "Superlove" (Mark Picchiotti remix) – 3:55

== Charts ==
Chart (2016)	Peak position
Belgium (Ultratip Bubbling Under Flanders)	88
UK Video Streaming (OCC)	71
US Dance Club Songs (Billboard)	7
US Hot R&B Songs (Billboard)	19
US Rhythmic Airplay (Billboard)	26

== Release history ==
Country	Date	Format	Label	Ref.
Worldwide	July 15, 2016	Digital download; streaming	RCA	
United States	August 2, 2016	Rhythmic contemporary	RCA	
United States	August 2, 2016	Urban contemporary	RCA	
United States	August 16, 2016	Contemporary hit radio	RCA	
