= On Sight =

Song by Kanye West

from the album Yeezus
- Released: June 18, 2013
- Recorded: January 7, 2012 – June 2013
- Genre: Industrial hip hop; electro-industrial; alternative dance
- Length: 2:36
- Label: Roc-A-Fella; Def Jam
- Songwriters: Kanye West; Thomas Bangalter; Guy-Manuel de Homem-Christo; Malik Jones; Che Smith; Elon Rutberg; Cydel Young; Derek Watkins; Mike Dean
- Producers: Kanye West; Daft Punk

Audio video
- "On Sight" on YouTube

Yeezus track listing
- 10 tracks: 1. "On Sight"; 2. "Black Skinhead"; 3. "I Am a God"; 4. "New Slaves"; 5. "Hold My Liquor"; 6. "I'm in It"; 7. "Blood on the Leaves"; 8. "Guilt Trip"; 9. "Send It Up"; 10. "Bound 2"

"On Sight" is a song by American rapper Kanye West from his sixth studio album, Yeezus (2013). It was produced by West and Daft Punk, with additional production by Benji B and Mike Dean. The song includes an electronic production style that was mainly contributed by Daft Punk, who were the first people West became involved with for the album. The song itself was first heard when performed live by West at the Governors Ball Music Festival in 2013.

The song contains a studio recreation of "Sermon (He'll Give Us What We Really Need)" by Holy Name of Mary Choral Family, sung by a choir. Lyrics by West about Parkinson's disease were criticized by the American Parkinson Disease Association. The song received acclaim from music critics. The song charted on both the US Billboard Bubbling Under Hot 100 and US Hot R&B/Hip-Hop Songs charts at number ten and 38 respectively in 2013.

== Background ==
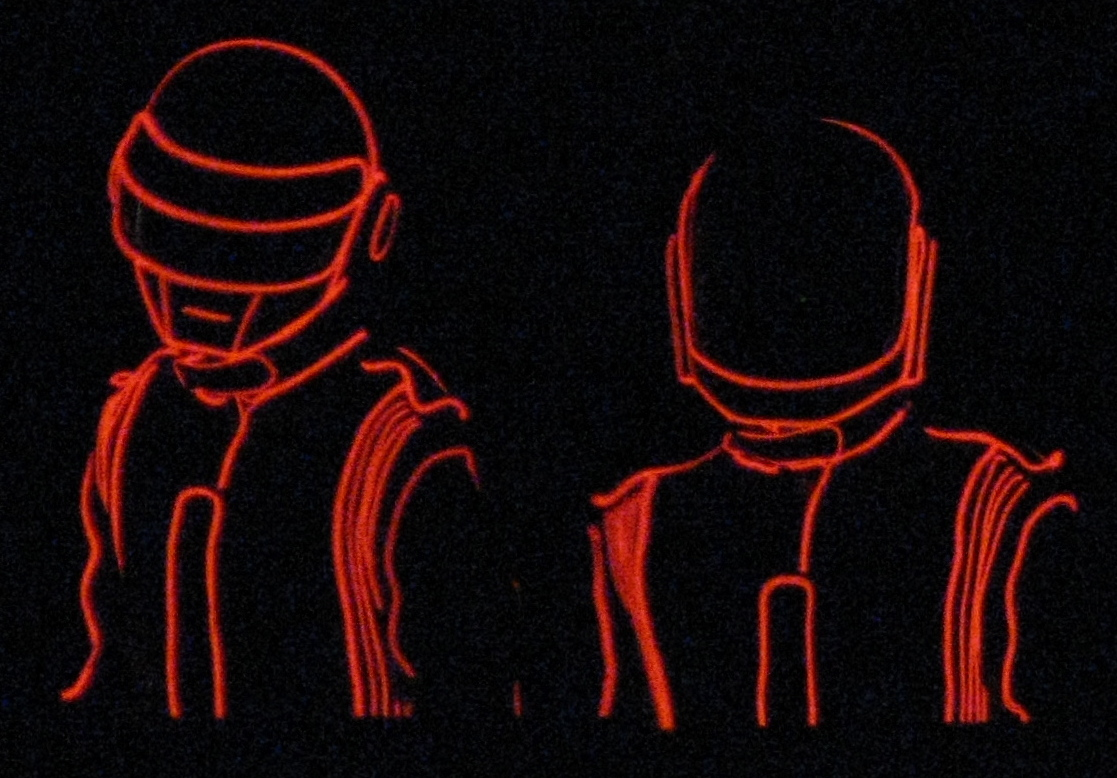
The song stands among Daft Punk's involvement with Yeezus.

"On Sight" was first heard when West performed it live at the Governors Ball Music Festival on June 9, 2013, nine days before the album's release. Thomas Bangalter of French duo Daft Punk revealed in an April 2013 interview about their album Random Access Memories that during the recording of it, the duo worked with West on material for his next album. At the listening party for Yeezus on June 10, West said in a brief speech after playback that he worked with Daft Punk on three or four of the songs, but "Black Skinhead" was the only one the public knew at the time that they had been involved with and the duo are among the album's major producers. Bangalter revealed in a July 2013 interview that Daft Punk were the first people West came to during the creation of Yeezus.

== Composition and production ==
"On Sight"
Audio sample of "On Sight", featuring West setting up the narrative of Yeezus over electronic production.

The song includes an electronic sound, which was mostly crafted by the producers Daft Punk. The production of its opening moments left people polarized upon first listen of the introductory track, which was confirmed by Rick Rubin as intentional. In the outro, West recalls the "I need you right now" refrain of his 2007 single "Stronger". When describing the song's sound, Noah Goldstein was quoted as saying:

"On Sight" sets a new bar. Nobody's doing that. There's no chance in hell that anybody's gonna put that on and be like, 'Oh, that's J. Cole'-- not to diss J. Cole. But there's only one person who can do that kind of shit.

The song contains a studio recreation of "Sermon (He'll Give Us What We Really Need)", written by Keith Carter Sr. and performed by Holy Name of Mary Choral Family, sung by a choir.

== Release and reception ==
"On Sight" was released on June 18, 2013, as the opening track on West's sixth studio album Yeezus. It was changed to being the first track instead of "Blood on the Leaves" at the last minute. Scottish record producer Hudson Mohawke described this decision as being "probably for the best", explaining by calling "On Sight" what "puts a message across that this is a very different record".

The song was met with widespread acclaim from music critics, with the majority of them praising its position as the album's opener. Helen Brown of The Telegraph viewed the song as being where "West slams the breaks [sic] on an industrial-electro grind for a sudden, gloriously demented burst of the Holy Name of Mary Choral Family". Its position on Yeezus was branded by Jon Dolan from Rolling Stone as being a "system-shock body rock of an album opener". Steph Blasnik of Mic claimed for West to be "almost taunting the listener" with the bridge: "How much do I not give a fuck? / Let me show you right now before you give it up", and viewed the bridge as where "short and to the point nature sets the tone for the album and lets you know what it all about — non-compliance". Chris Martins of SPIN viewed the track as being a "glitch-blitzed Atari Grown Man Riot of an opener". The Guardian critic Alexis Petridis wrote that "a screaming, distorted acid line runs through the opening 'On Sight'" and in reference to Daft Punk, viewed it as "the kind of music some people doubtless wish they'd made instead of Random Access Memories". The New York Times's Jon Pareles wrote in response to the song: "The music hurls Mr. West's rhymes like a catapult, an effect compounded by his vehement delivery. But the sound and attitude often say more than the actual words".

== Controversy ==
"On Sight" contains controversial lyrics referencing Parkinson's disease: "Soon as I pull up and park the Benz / We get this bitch shaking like Parkinson's". The lyrics aroused controversy from the American Parkinson Disease Association (APDA). The group called the verse "distasteful and the product of obvious ignorance". Maurice Bobb of MTV replied to the lyrics, stating: "The self-professed 'black new wave artist' is no stranger to controversial lyrics, drawing the ire of PETA for saying that his 'mink is draggin' on the floor' on last year's "Cold", but APDA's outrage seems perfunctory considering that this isn't the first time a rapper has used the symptoms of Parkinson's disease for lyrical effect", and West had yet to respond to the APDA at the time.

== Commercial performance ==
In the week that Yeezus was released, the track reached number ten on the US Billboard Bubbling Under Hot 100 and dropped out of the chart permanently afterwards. It also debuted at number 38 on the US Hot R&B/Hip-Hop Songs chart.

== Live performances ==
West first performed "On Sight" live at the Governors Ball Music Festival in June 2013. In response to the performance, Tom Breihan of Stereogum described the song as what "sounded like Kanye's version of late-'80s industrial dance music". When performing the song live at Seattle's KeyArena on The Yeezus Tour in October 2013, West played the choir sample repeatedly. Later that month, on the same tour, West staggered out to the bleeps of the song when he performed it live as the opener for a concert at Staples Center in Los Angeles and he also performed it as the opener to a concert on the tour at Dallas' American Airlines Center in December 2013.

== Credits and personnel ==
Credits adapted from the liner notes of Yeezus.

- Songwriters: Kanye West, Guy-Manuel de Homem-Christo, Thomas Bangalter, Malik Jones, Ché Smith, Elon Rutberg, Cydel Young, Derrick Watkins, Mike Dean
- Producers: Kanye West and Daft Punk
- Additional producers: Mike Dean #MWA and Benji B
- Engineers: Noah Goldstein, Anthony Kilhoffer, Andrew Dawson and Mike Dean
- Assistant engineers: Marc Portheau, Khoi Huynh, Raoul Le Pennec, Nabil Essemlani, Keith Parry, Kenta Yonesaka, David Rowland, Sean Oakley, Eric Lynn, Dave "Squirrel" Covell and Josh Smith
- Mix engineer: Noah Goldstein
- Assistant mix engineer: Sean Oakley, Eric Lynn, Dave "Squirrel" Covell and Josh Smith
- Choir production: Ken Lewis
- Drums: Dylan Wissing
- Percussion: Matt Teitelman
- Choir director: Alvin Fields
- Choir: Carmen Roman, K. Nita, John Morgan, Jessenia Peña, Ronnie Artis, Crystal Brun, Sean Drew, Natalis Ruby Rubero, Lorraine Berry, Gloria Ryann, Timeka Lee
- Choir engineer: Uri Djemal

== Charts ==
Chart (2013)	Peak position
Australian Streaming Tracks (ARIA)	39
US Bubbling Under Hot 100 (Billboard)	10
US Hot R&B/Hip-Hop Songs (Billboard)	38
US On-Demand Streaming Songs (Billboard)	15

== Certifications ==
Region	Certification	Certified units/sales
United States (RIAA)	Gold	500,000^{‡}
^{‡} Sales+streaming figures based on certification alone.
