= Hold My Liquor =

Song by Kanye West

from the album Yeezus
- Released: June 18, 2013
- Recorded: January 27 – June 2013
- Genre: Hip house
- Length: 5:26
- Label: Roc-A-Fella; Def Jam
- Songwriters: Kanye West; Mike Dean; Justin Vernon; Keith Cozart; Elon Rutberg; Che Smith; Malik Jones; Alejandra Ghersi; Cydel Young; Derrick Watkins
- Producers: Kanye West; Mike Dean

Yeezus track listing
- 10 tracks: 1. "On Sight"; 2. "Black Skinhead"; 3. "I Am a God"; 4. "New Slaves"; 5. "Hold My Liquor"; 6. "I'm in It"; 7. "Blood on the Leaves"; 8. "Guilt Trip"; 9. "Send It Up"; 10. "Bound 2"

"Hold My Liquor" is a song by American rapper Kanye West, from his sixth studio album Yeezus (2013). It was primarily produced by West and longtime collaborator Mike Dean, who also provides a guitar solo, with additional production from Arca and Noah Goldstein. It features vocals from rapper Chief Keef and singer-songwriter Justin Vernon of Bon Iver. It is a house ballad that is built upon a pulsating synth beat with metallic stabs. In the song, West stumbles into an ex-girlfriend's home for reckless sex, with lyrics that contain references to substance abuse and issues with relationships and self-image.

The song received acclaim from music critics, who praised its instrumental, West's verse, Dean's guitar solo, and the performances of Vernon and Chief Keef; one reviewer placed the song on his list of the best songs of 2013. Despite not being released as a single, the song was able to chart in the United States on Billboard's Bubbling Under Hot 100, Hot R&B/Hip-Hop Songs. West performed the song on the Yeezus Tour and at the Glastonbury Festival in 2015. It was covered by Lorde and CEO in 2013.

== Background and composition ==
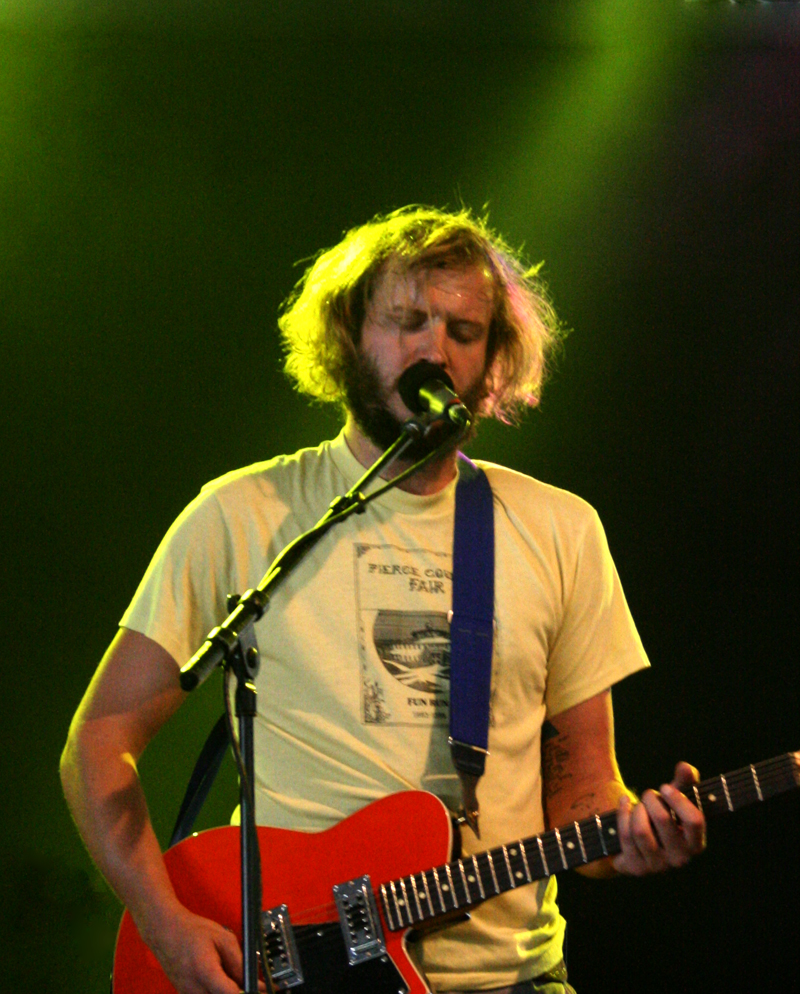
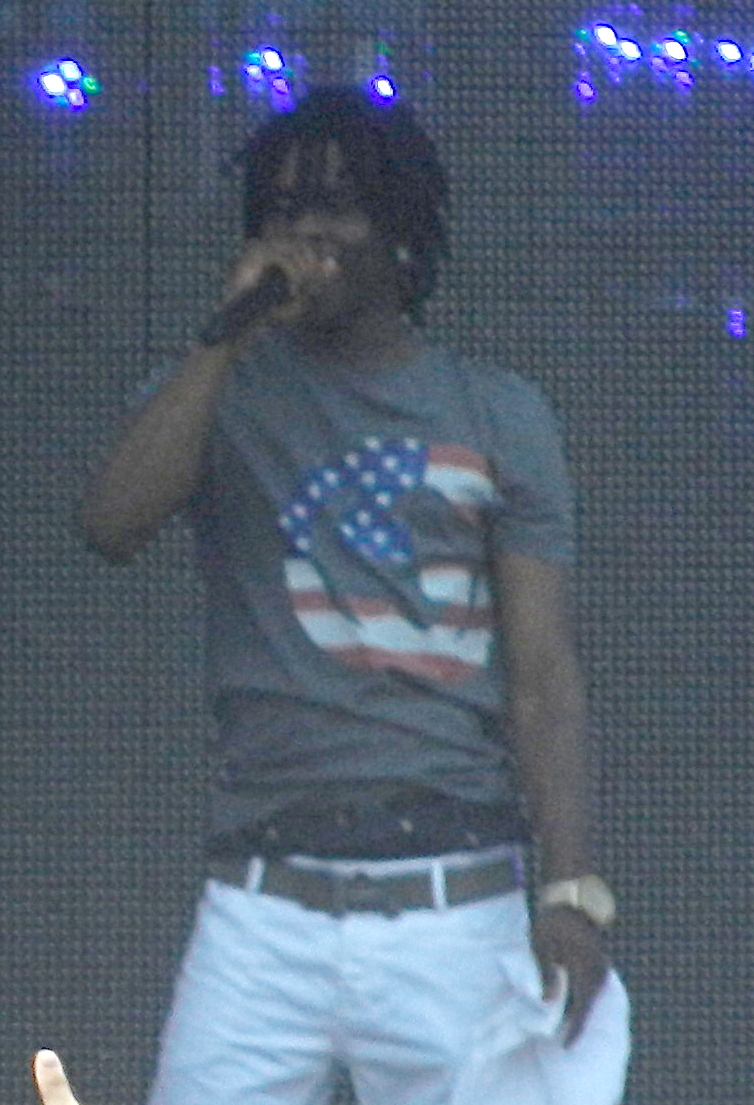
The song contains vocals from singer-songwriter Justin Vernon (left) and rapper Chief Keef (right), who sing the intro and hook, respectively.

"Hold My Liquor" was included as the fifth track on the track-listing of Kanye West's sixth studio album Yeezus (2013). In earlier leaked versions of the album, the song was titled "Can't Handle My Liquor" and "Can't Hold My Liquor", before being shortened. According to West, "Hold My Liquor" almost didn't make the album at one point. The track contains vocals from American rapper Chief Keef, who sings the hook, and singer-songwriter Justin Vernon of Bon Iver, who sings the intro. "Hold My Liquor" is not the first time West has worked with Chief Keef and Vernon; West had appeared on a remix of Chief Keef's song "I Don't Like" in 2012 and Vernon contributed vocals to West's songs "Monster" and "Lost in the World" from his 2010 album My Beautiful Dark Twisted Fantasy. Their performances on "Hold My Liquor" were first heard at a listening party for Yeezus.

"Hold My Liquor" was written by West, Mike Dean, Vernon, Chief Keef, Elon Rutberg, Che Smith, Malik Jones, Alejandra Ghersi, Cydel Young, and Derrick Watkins. It was produced by West and Dean, with additional production by Arca and Noah Goldstein. Musically, it is a house ballad that contains industrial flourishes. The elongated track is musically frenetic; its instrumental is built on pulsating synths and a guitar over a slow, steady 4/4 beat. The lyrics of West's sole verse are underscored by metallic, distorted stabs. His lyrics reflect issues with substance abuse, relationships, and self-image and contain references to Deepak Chopra and Tupac Shakur. More specifically, they describe West stumbling into an ex-girlfriend's home for "some emotionally reckless and scattered sex." Longtime collaborator Mike Dean contributed guitar on the track, which was compared to the work of American electronic rock band Ratatat. Dean responded to the comparisons by saying: "I don't even know them-- so I definitely didn't bite it. [laughs] I was doing some Queen shit."

== Critical reception ==
The song received critical acclaim from music critics, with many praising its instrumentation, West's vocals, and Dean's guitar solo. Multiple critics have described the track as "woozy." The Velvet Underground's Lou Reed gave the song a positive review in The Guardian saying: "'Hold My Liquor' is just heartbreaking, and particularly coming from where it's coming from – listen to that incredibly poignant hook from a tough guy like Chief Keef". He then praised its synthesized guitar solo, calling it "devastating" and "absolutely majestic." Gavin Haynes of NME called the song "the missing link between the woozy-weepy electronics of 808s... and his new incarnation [on Yeezus]." Jordan Sargent of Spin described the song as "the woozy and, arguably, darkest track" on Yeezus. Andrew Unterberger from Popdust also praised the song, claiming the instrumental was reminiscent of the Drive soundtrack and labeling West's verse a highlight. Unterberger did however, criticize Vernon and Chief Keef's contributions, calling them "uninspiring" and felt another verse by West would have been better. Jon Dolan of Rolling Stone described the song as "an elegantly wasted house ballad, with Justin Vernon of Bon Iver as dyspeptic diva crooning under the amber waves of drank and teenage Chicago rapper Chief Keef playing the sad gangsta."

Kyle Kramer of Complex named "Hold My Liquor" the best song of 2013. In 2018, Phil Witmer of Noisey looked back on "Hold My Liquor" and fellow Yeezus track "Black Skinhead", writing that they weren't rap, but 'rock anthems from the 25th century' and branded "Hold My Liquor" as the album's 'emotional peak'.

== Commercial performance ==
Despite not having been released as a single, "Hold My Liquor" managed to debut at number six on the US Billboard Bubbling Under Hot 100 and remained on the chart for only one more week. The track also debuted at number 32 on the US Hot R&B/Hip-Hop Songs chart upon the album's release and fell down eleven places to number 43 the next week.

== Live performances and cover versions ==
Before West had officially announced The Yeezus Tour, Mike Dean gave confirmation of a tour for the album and added that "Hold My Liquor" would be great to play live. West subsequently performed it at the KeyArena in Seattle on the tour's opener and again on the second day of West's performance at the Staples Center in Los Angeles. It was again performed on the tour during the first concert at the Barclays Center in New York City, with a gremlin-like monster joining him on stage during it. However, during another performance at Glastonbury in 2015 with Vernon, West forgot the lyrics. When speaking, West said: "[we went] off the rails and [had] a moment of feeling like we're back in the studio, or feeling like we're back in high school" and named Vernon as his favorite living artist.

Lorde performed a cover version at the 2013 iHeartRadio Music Festival. In her version, Lorde sang abridged versions of Vernon's intro, Chief Keef's hook, and West's verse, bookending the performing with the line "bitch, I'm back out my coma." According to Jordan Sargent of Spin, "her backing band kept the beat's shrieking punctuations and played up the bass drum's insistent, almost techno-level thump." ceo uploaded his cover version, titled "My Liquor", to SoundCloud on December 9, 2013, but later deleted it. A revamped version was released by BJ the Chicago Kid on October 7, 2014, titled "Can't Hold My Liquor", which kept several important components of the original.

== Credits and personnel ==
Credits adapted from the Yeezus liner notes.

- Songwriter – Kanye West, Mike Dean, Justin Vernon, Keith Cozart, Elon Rutberg, Che Smith, Malik Jones, Alejandra Ghersi, Cydel Young, and Derrick Watkins
- Producer – Kanye West and Mike Dean
- Additional producer – Arca and Noah Goldstein
- Additional instruments – Mike Dean (guitar solo)
- Engineer – Noah Goldstein, Anthony Kilhoffer, and Mike Dean
- Assistant engineer – Marc Portheau, Khoï Huynh, Raoul Le Pennec, Nabil Essemlani, Keith Parry, Kenta Yonesaka, Dave Rowland, Kevin Matela, Sean Oakley, Eric Lynn, Dave 'Squirrel' Covell, and Josh Smith
- Mix – Manny Marroquin at Larrabee Studios, Los Angeles, CA
- Mix assisted – Delbert Bowers and Chris Galland
- Vocals – Chief Keef and Justin Vernon

== Charts ==
| Chart (2013) | Peak position |
|---|---|
| US Bubbling Under Hot 100 (Billboard) | 6 |
| US Hot R&B/Hip-Hop Songs (Billboard) | 32 |
| US On-Demand Songs (Billboard) | 21 |

== Certifications ==
| Region | Certification | Certified units/sales |
|---|---|---|
| United States (RIAA) | Gold | 500,000^{‡} |
^{‡} Sales+streaming figures based on certification alone.
