= I Am a God =

Song by Kanye West

from the album Yeezus
- Released: June 18, 2013
- Recorded: October 5, 2012 – May 2013
- Genre: Industrial hip-hop; electronic; trance
- Length: 3:52
- Label: Roc-A-Fella; Def Jam
- Songwriters: Kanye West; Guy-Manuel de Homem-Christo; Thomas Bangalter; Ross Birchard; Justin Vernon; Malik Jones; Che Smith; Cydel Young; Elon Rutberg; Mike Dean; Derrick Watkins; Clifton Bailey; Harvel Hart; Anand Bakshi; Rahul Burman
- Producers: West; Dean; Daft Punk; Hudson Mohawke (co.)

Audio video
- "I Am A God" on YouTube

Yeezus track listing
- 10 tracks: 1. "On Sight"; 2. "Black Skinhead"; 3. "I Am a God"; 4. "New Slaves"; 5. "Hold My Liquor"; 6. "I'm in It"; 7. "Blood on the Leaves"; 8. "Guilt Trip"; 9. "Send It Up"; 10. "Bound 2"

"I Am a God" is a song by American rapper Kanye West from his sixth studio album Yeezus (2013). The song credits God as a featured performer. It was produced by West, Hudson Mohawke, Daft Punk, and Mike Dean, and includes vocals from Justin Vernon of Bon Iver. The song contains samples of "Forward Inna Dem Clothes", written by Capleton and H. Hart, and performed by the former, and "Are Zindagi Hai Khel" by Manna Dey, R. D. Burman and Asha Bhosle.

West explained the message of "I Am a God" on various occasions, once claiming that it was for those who lacked confidence in themselves. The song includes elements of industrial and electronic music. West hypes himself up throughout it and references Jesus in comparison to him. The song received widely positive reviews from music critics, with West's arrogance being praised by a number of them.

"I Am a God" charted on both the US Billboard Bubbling Under Hot 100 and US Hot R&B/Hip-Hop Songs charts at number 9 and 37 respectively in 2013. West debuted the song by performing it live at the Metropolitan Museum of Art's Costume Institute Gala in May 2013 and later performed it on multiple occasions throughout that year. One line in the song was changed to being rapped without instrumentation when West updated the album on Apple Music in 2016.

== Background ==
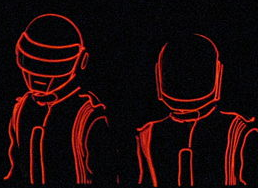
Daft Punk contributed production to the song.

Since its release, West has talked about the message of the song in numerous interviews. In an interview with W in June 2013, it was made known that the song was inspired by a 'diss' from a major fashion designer during Paris Fashion Week, where West was informed that he would be invited to a widely anticipated runway show only on the condition that he agree not to attend any other shows. Thomas Bangalter of French duo Daft Punk revealed in an April 2013 interview about their album Random Access Memories that during the recording sessions, the duo used part of their time to work with West on music for the rapper's next album. In reference to the material recorded by West, Bangalter stated that "It was very raw: he was rapping – kind of screaming primally, actually" and Guy-Manuel de Homem-Christo of Daft Punk added that "Kanye doesn't give a fuck." Bangalter stated in a July 2013 interview that the duo "were the first people that Kanye came to" when working on Yeezus and they stand among the album's major producers. Hudson Mohawke co-produced the song and also stands among the album's major producers; he had previously helped produce West's work in 2012 on the GOOD Music collaboration "Mercy". Prior to working with West on Yeezus, Justin Vernon of Bon Iver had appeared on his 2010 single "Monster" from My Beautiful Dark Twisted Fantasy. Vernon stated of collaborating with West again: "After Twisted Fantasy, I kind of assumed that I'd get the call again at some point. I get along with Kanye really well and I think his musical decisions are exquisite."

Before it was officially announced that West's sixth studio album was titled Yeezus, it had been rumored to be titled I Am God, which caused controversy. The information was later revealed that it was likely for there to be a song titled "I Am a God" on West's then-upcoming album. West's camp said the title was a reference to Psalm 82: "I said, 'You are gods, / And all of you are children of the Most High." West offered an explanation of the song in 2015 during the course of an interview with Show Studio, stating:

The reason why I made the song 'I Am A God' is so those people that feel less than can turn it up and say it loud and embrace it for themselves, that God is inside all of us. It wasn't about specifically me. It was about us as a race; that we are an extension of God, that we all have God inside of us.

Accusations of blasphemy led by the title were defended by Priest Father Matthew Moretz on August 30, 2013. The song credits God as a featured performer, which had been rumoured before the album's release. During a 2013 interview with Zane Lowe on BBC Radio 1, West responded to criticism of claiming to be a God by delving into the topic of classism and self-hate, positing the question: "Would it have been better if I had a song that said, 'I Am a Nigga?' Or if I had a song that said, 'I Am a Gangsta'? Or I had a song that said, 'I Am a Pimp'? All of those colors and patinas fit better on a person like me, right?" West would go on to offer further explanations in the midst of his performances during The Yeezus Tour in October of that year.

== Recording ==
On June 12, 2013, six days before Yeezus was released, a video was uploaded on West's website of him recording vocals for "I Am a God" with producers Rick Rubin and Mike Dean. Record producer Noah Goldstein revealed that after first hearing West say "I am a God," everyone was like "OK, that's where we're going-- let's go all the way there." Hudson Mohawke elaborated, revealing the track to be one of the first songs that West had for the album and stated that it "was like the blueprint." Goldstein compared the recording process of the track to that of the 2011 collaborative song "New Day" by West and Jay-Z from Watch the Throne. In October 2016, a demo of the track was uploaded to SoundCloud, which featured a new verse and synth line. This version was later sampled into "Modern Jam" by Travis Scott in July 2023.

== Composition ==
West repeats "God!" in an exasperated way at the end of "Black Skinhead" to show the mind of the character portrayed on Yeezus as mutating the external idea of God into an internal one. This leads into West hyping himself up on "I Am a God". The song, like most tracks on Yeezus, includes elements of industrial music. The electronic soundscape of the song was mainly crafted by the producers Daft Punk. West screams within it. The song samples "Forward Inna Dem Clothes", written by Capelton and H. Hart, and performed by the former, and "Are Zindagi Hai Khel" by Manna Dey, R. D. Burman and Asha Bhosle. West uses certain lyrics to draw a comparison between Jesus and himself, with the former being the most high.

West updated "I Am a God" solely on Apple Music in April 2016. At one minute and 15 seconds into the song, the beat was changed to cutting out under the line "Y'all better quit playing with God."

== Release and reception ==
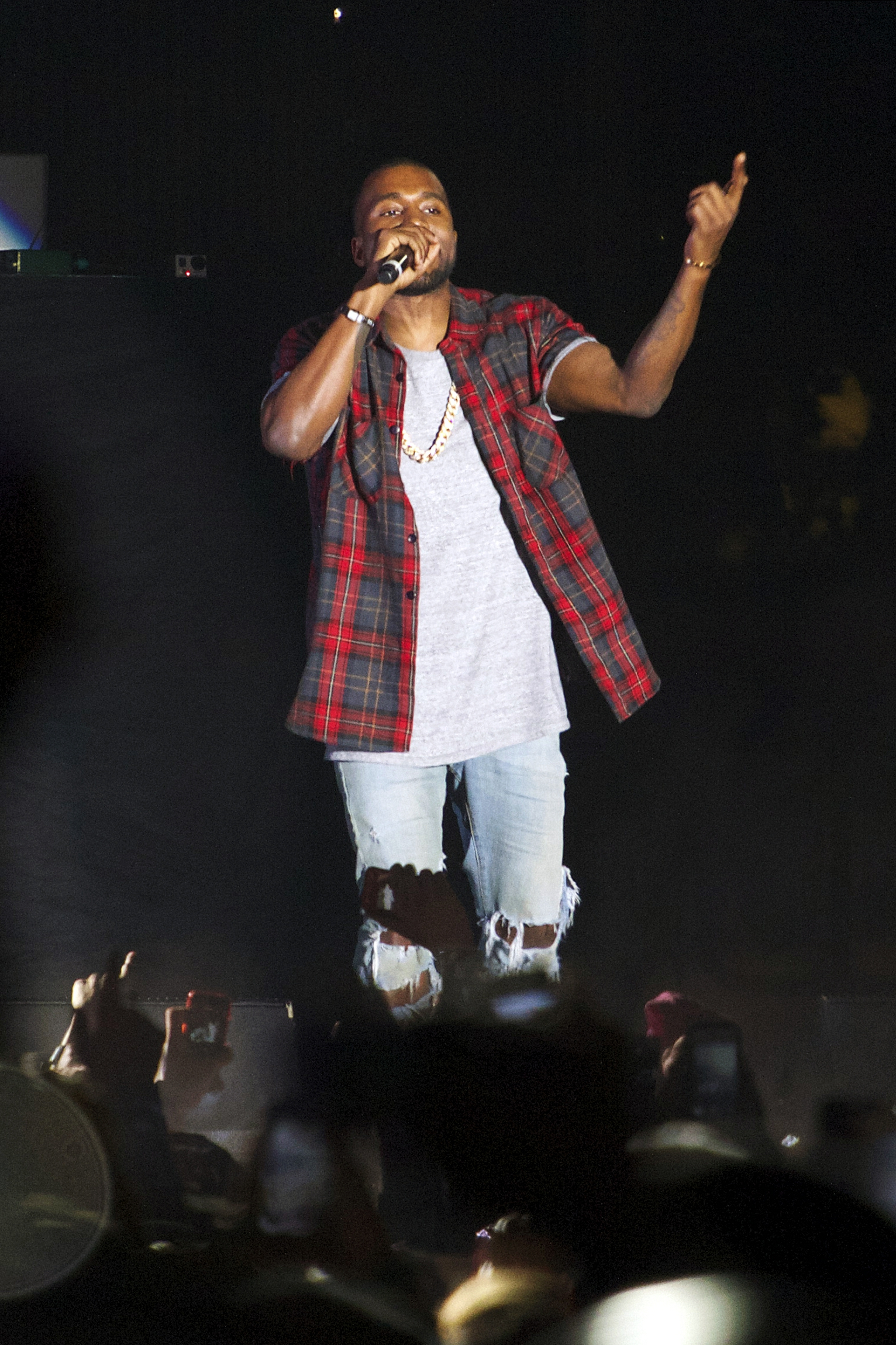
Critics often praised West's arrogance.

"I Am a God" was released on June 18, 2013, as the third track on West's sixth studio album Yeezus. Before its release on the album, he debuted the song at the Metropolitan Museum of Art's Costume Institute Gala in New York City on May 6, 2013. West performed the song wearing a "studded mask" and dedicated it to his then-fiancé Kim Kardashian.

Since release, "I Am a God" has received universal acclaim from music critics. Jon Dolan of Rolling Stone looked at it as an example on Yeezus of where "Kanye's lyrics are pretty focused" and he renders "his classic themes as petulant primal screams." Dolan called the song "a lurching, nightmarish throbber." The staff of Billboard wrote of the song: "Through shooting synths, squeals and mushed bass, Kanye revels in all the negativity he's endured -- the hate received for everything from his fashion sense to brand of hip-hop -- and proclaims himself to be a god 'until the day I get struck by lightning.'" Ryan Dombal of Pitchfork claimed that the song "is not simply the latest self-important blast from one of pop culture's pre-eminent egoists. For starters, the track sounds less triumphant than breathtakingly vexed, crashing in with a gnarled dancehall vocal sample and paranoid sawtooth synths that aim to destroy. Here, Kanye raps about loyalty, respect, threesomes, and, yes, croissants with the urgency of someone being chased by a 30-ton steamroller." Dombal claimed for the primal screams to pierce the song and bring "the beat's heaving evil" to a brief halt.

Alexis Petridis of The Guardian viewed "I Am a God" as what "offers up a bass pulse overlaid with epic, cavernous synthesisers" that he claimed to be influenced by Daft Punk. Petridis looked at the song's short-circuiting as being "simultaneously incredibly powerful and deeply disconcerting." Slate's Forrest Wickman cites "I Am a God" as one of the album's tracks that "rattle as if they'd been produced by industrial hip-hop group Death Grips" and compared the song's heavy bass to the band's single "Come Up and Get Me." Randall Roberts of the Los Angeles Times wrote of West's performance: "Here's a man so powerful that he can boss around both massage therapists and waiters, as he does in 'I Am a God': 'I am a god [sic] / So hurry up with my damn massage / in the French … restaurant / hurry up with my damn croissants.' If it weren't embedded within a truly frightening song featuring curdling screams and deep bass, the line would be laughable. As presented, his intentions are unclear — other than to remind you that, you know, 'I am a God!'" Rolling Stone ranked the track at number 65 on their list of the 100 best songs of 2013, writing of it: "This is the greatest hate-rap screed by a deity with dangerously low blood sugar in ages." NME ranked the track at number 18 on their list of the 50 best songs of 2013, writing: "Mesmeric in its arrogance and undeniable in its greatness, only Kanye would've had the stones to attempt a song like this with such poker-faced seriousness, and only he could've managed to pull it off."

== Commercial performance ==
Upon the release of Yeezus, the song debuted at number 9 on the US Billboard Bubbling Under Hot 100 and lasted for one week. That same week, "I Am a God" entered at number 37 on the US Hot R&B/Hip-Hop Songs chart. The entry stood as the first time that God had ever charted on US Billboard charts as a credited artist and associate chart production manager Alex Vitoulis initially added God to the artists of the Billboard computerized charts system, which caused laughter. The following week, the song descended 11 places to number 48 on the chart.

== Live performances ==
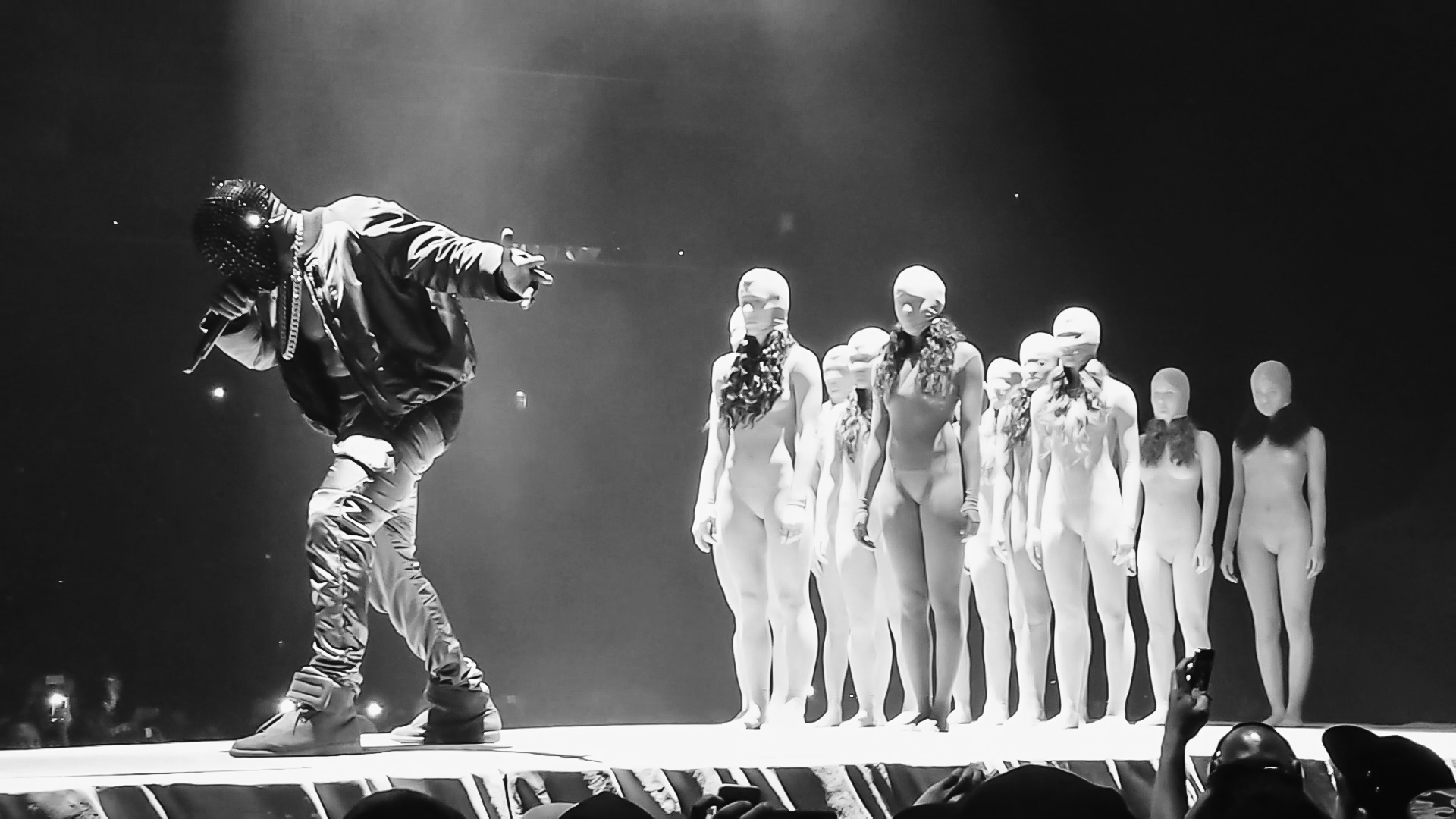
West masked while performing "I Am a God" at Barclays Center in Brooklyn, New York City, 2013.

"I Am a God" was first performed live by West at the Metropolitan Museum of Art's Costume Institute Gala on May 6, 2013. West later performed the song at the 2013 Governors Ball Music Festival on June 9, nine days before the album's release, alongside other tracks from it. At the opening concert of The Yeezus Tour in Seattle's KeyArena, the song was the ninth to be performed by West. West delivered a live performance of the song at the Barclays Center in Brooklyn on November 19 as part of the tour. The performance began with West being picked up off the ground by women after he had ended a performance of "Black Skinhead" lying on his back. West left the line "Hurry up with my damn croissants!" to be shouted by the crowd.

== In the media ==
In August 2013, The Association of French Bakers (a satirical pseudonym of writer W. David Marx) penned a letter to West over the lyrics "In a French-ass restaurant/Hurry up with my damn croissants," telling him to be patient. The letter stressed that a croissant cannot be rushed because one is comparable to a work of art, though the bakers gave West a pass and stated that they take his lyrics seriously.

The trailer of 2013 film House of Versace was set to the song, which included Gina Gershon saying lines such as "I was a girl in power since the day I was born" and "I am Versace!"

"I Am a God" was used in the trailer of the 2016 film Assassin's Creed. and for 2018 video game UFC 3. and for the 2019 film Waves, directed by Trey Edward Shults and produced by A24.

In early 2025, Australian singer Nick Cave said in his newsletter “The Red Hand Files” that he wanted “I Am A God” to be played at his funeral.

In February 2018, Chilean-American composer Nicolas Jaar, under the alias A.A.L. (Against All Logic), sampled it on his song "Such A Bad Way".

== Credits and personnel ==
Credits adapted from the Yeezus liner notes.

- Songwriter – Kanye West, Guy-Manuel de Homem-Christo, Thomas Bangalter, Ross Birchard, Justin Vernon, Malik Jones, Che Smith, Cydel Young, Elon Rutberg, Mike Dean, Derrick Watkins, Clifton Bailey, Harvel Hart, Anand Bakshi, and Rahul Burman
- Producer – Kanye West, Mike Dean #MWA, and Daft Punk
- Co-producer – Hudson Mohawke
- Additional vocals – Justin Vernon
- Additional programming – Noah Goldstein, Che Pope, and Travis Scott
- Engineer – Noah Goldstein, Anthony Kilhoffer, and Mike Dean
- Assistant engineer – Marc Portheau, Khoï Huynh, Raoul Le Pennec, Nabil Essemlani, Keith Parry, Kenta Yonesaka, and David Rowland
- Mix – Manny Marroquin at Larrabee Studios, Los Angeles, CA
- Mix assisted – Delbert Bowers and Chris Galland

== Charts ==
Chart (2013)	Peak position
Australian Streaming Tracks (ARIA)	32
US Bubbling Under Hot 100 (Billboard)	9
US Hot R&B/Hip-Hop Songs (Billboard)	37
US On-Demand Streaming Songs (Billboard)	14

== Certifications ==
Certifications and sales for I Am a God
Region	Certification	Certified units/sales
United States (RIAA)	Gold	500,000^{‡}
^{‡} Sales+streaming figures based on certification alone.
