= I'm in It =

2013 song by Kanye West

Song by Kanye West

from the album Yeezus
- Released: June 18, 2013
- Recorded: January–June 2013
- Studio: No Name Hotel (Paris); Gee Jam (Port Antonio, Jamaica); Real World (Bath, England); Shangri-La (Malibu, CA)
- Genre: Hip hop; dancehall; industrial; trap
- Length: 3:54
- Label: Roc-A-Fella; Def Jam
- Songwriters: Kanye West; Justin Vernon; Jeffrey Ethan Campbell; Josh Leary; Malik Jones; Cydel Young; Sakiya Sandifer; Elon Rutberg; Mike Dean; Andre Harris; Jill Scott; Vidal Davis; Carvin Haggins; Kenny Lattimore
- Producer: Kanye West

Yeezus track listing
- 10 tracks: 1. "On Sight"; 2. "Black Skinhead"; 3. "I Am a God"; 4. "New Slaves"; 5. "Hold My Liquor"; 6. "I'm in It"; 7. "Blood on the Leaves"; 8. "Guilt Trip"; 9. "Send It Up"; 10. "Bound 2"

"I'm in It" is a song by American rapper Kanye West from his sixth studio album, Yeezus (2013). The song features additional vocals from Justin Vernon and Assassin. West served the role of lead producer and Evian Christ co-produced it with Dom $olo, while Noah Goldstein, Arca, and Mike Dean contributed additional production. The rapper, Evian Christ, and Dean served as co-writers with the vocalists, Malik Yusef, Cyhi the Prynce, Sakiya Sandifer, and Elon Rutberg, while Dre & Vidal, Jill Scott, Carvin Haggins, and Kenny Lattimore received credits due to a sample of their composition. The song started as a six-minute arrangement with a different sample and melody, edited down to run for around three minutes.

A hip hop, dancehall, industrial, and trap track, "I'm in It" features prominent reggae elements and a sample of Lattimore's "Lately". Lyrically, West discusses a sexual fantasy of himself and Kim Kardashian. The song received polarized reviews from music critics, who were divided in their feelings towards West's sexual lyrics. Some highlighted his fantasy and others criticized the inappropriateness, while a few critics praised the production. The song reached numbers 17 and 43 on the US Billboard Bubbling Under Hot 100 Singles and Hot R&B/Hip-Hop Songs charts, respectively. West performed it during The Yeezus Tour (2013–14).

== Background and recording ==
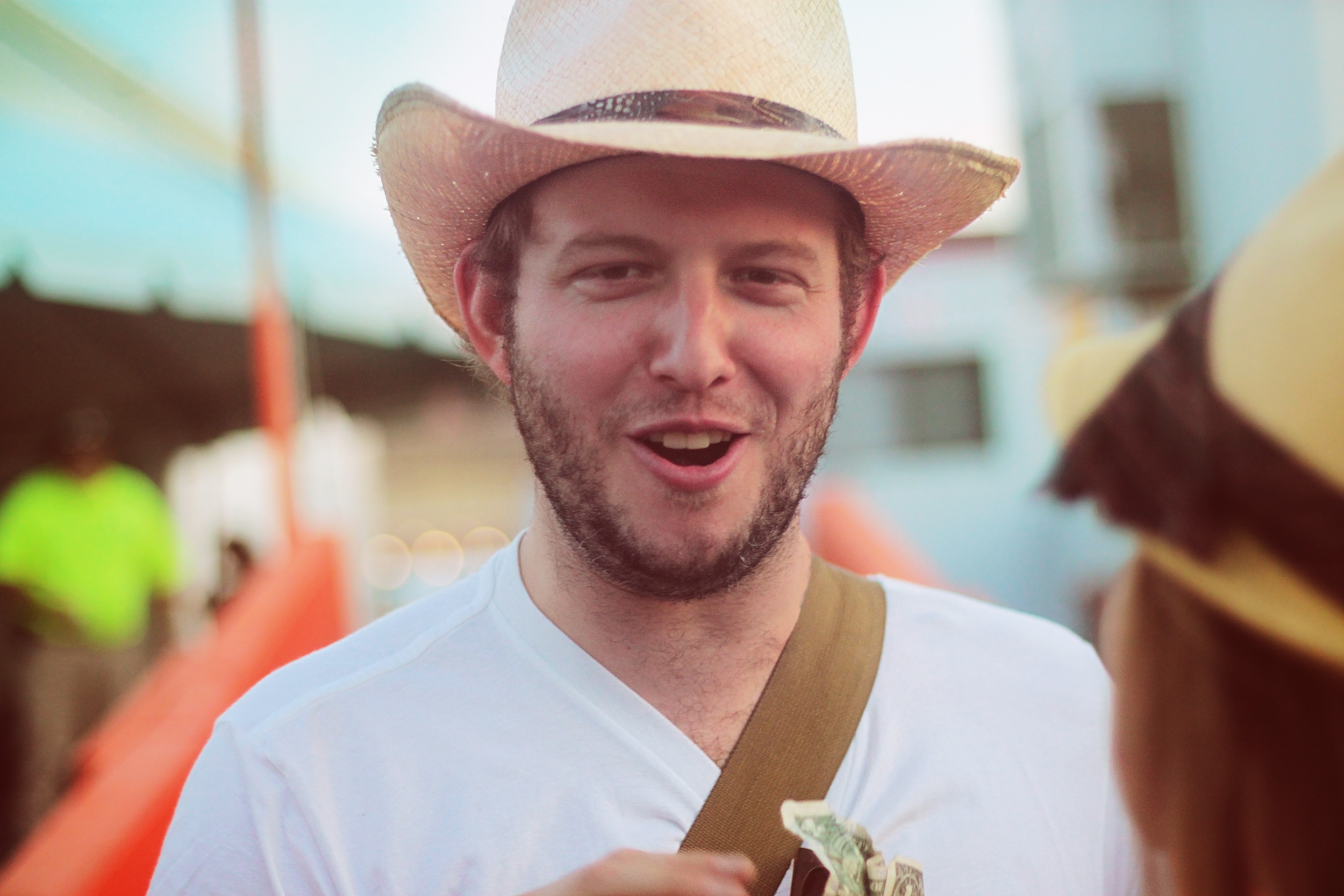
"I'm in It" features a guest appearance from Justin Vernon, who worked on different tracks for Yeezus and started writing for the song after a power outage by a campfire.

Jamaican deejay Assassin commented that West decided to go in the direction of Jamaican culture on the album as he incorporated dancehall elements, benefitting the genre for continuing its combination with hip hop. He felt that West's usage of dancehall and reggae influenced different artists of his styles, making front-page headlines across continents for working with him. Assassin was recruited by West's team at Gee Jam Studios in Jamaica's Portland Parish, finding the initial sessions to resemble his posse cut "Mercy" (2012) and he delivered different verses to instrumentals with no other vocals. West enjoyed listening to Assassin's recordings and he contacted him to use one of the verses without disclosing it was for Yeezus at the time; the deejay excitedly learnt he was on the album when at a club. The two did not communicate directly during the recording process and first met each other in December 2014, being introduced by Rodney "Darkchild" Jerkins. Around a year later, Assassin recalled that receiving recognition from someone like West proved he was "doing a lot right".

After Bon Iver singer Justin Vernon collaborated with West on his fifth studio album My Beautiful Dark Twisted Fantasy in 2010, he developed a bond with the rapper and worked on ten songs for Yeezus, of which three were included. Vernon was playing guitar around a campfire and drinking beer with a band of his at a barn when there was a sudden power outage, leading to him starting to write for "I'm in It". Record producer Mike Dean cited Vernon as an artist West would always collaborate with and did not pinpoint him as any musical genre, not knowing if he would sing like the Bee Gees or perform in distortion and comparing his focus on emotion to Michael McDonald. Vernon looked back with a lack of awareness of his lyrics on the song and described West as discussing "really violently and stunningly visual sex shit", which came from the "intelligent conversations" about the state of women held in the studio rather than how the rapper talked to his friends. The singer also compared the imagery to the 2000 film American Psycho, through West resembling a director as not everything he discusses is "actually him saying it every time". Vernon felt that he played a character on the song that would be defined by West's editing and used his section of singing "star fucker" for "calling somebody out", while he had no idea of what Assassin was saying.

West and the artists on his label GOOD Music repeatedly listened to English record producer Evian Christ's Kings and Them during the recording sessions for Cruel Summer, their compilation album released in 2012. This led to him recruiting Evian Christ for Yeezus; he later signed to GOOD Music on his major label debut. The producer was given two days to record material for West and crafted nine tracks in January 2013, one of which was selected for "I'm in It". The track started with "breathy sex sounds" over the snares for its sexual nature, going into overdrive with the emphasis after West contributed rapping. Evian Christ did a double-take on a couple of West's lines at first, although felt that the rapper had to "go all the way" about sexual topics. According to engineer Anthony Kilhoffer, the song originated with a different sample and melody that West abandoned for a six-minute arrangement, until producer Rick Rubin edited it to flow in the structure of a three-minute composition. Dean recalled how everyone would "push things to be weirder" and he moved in a more musical direction, although West gravitated towards hip hop and he praised the final product that contrasts with "crazy guitar parts and all this stadium stuff". Producer Noah Goldstein recalled that West was fully responsible for the reggae voices, standing as the curator of the production. The rapper produced "I'm in It", while Evian Christ and Dom $olo served as co-producers and additional production was contributed by Goldstein, Arca, and Dean. West, Evian Christ, and Dean co-wrote it with Vernon, Assassin, Malik Yusef, Cyhi the Prynce, Sakiya Sandifer, and Elon Rutberg, while the duo Dre & Vidal, Jill Scott, Carvin Haggins, and singer Kenny Lattimore received songwriting credits due to the sample of "Lately".

== Composition and lyrics ==
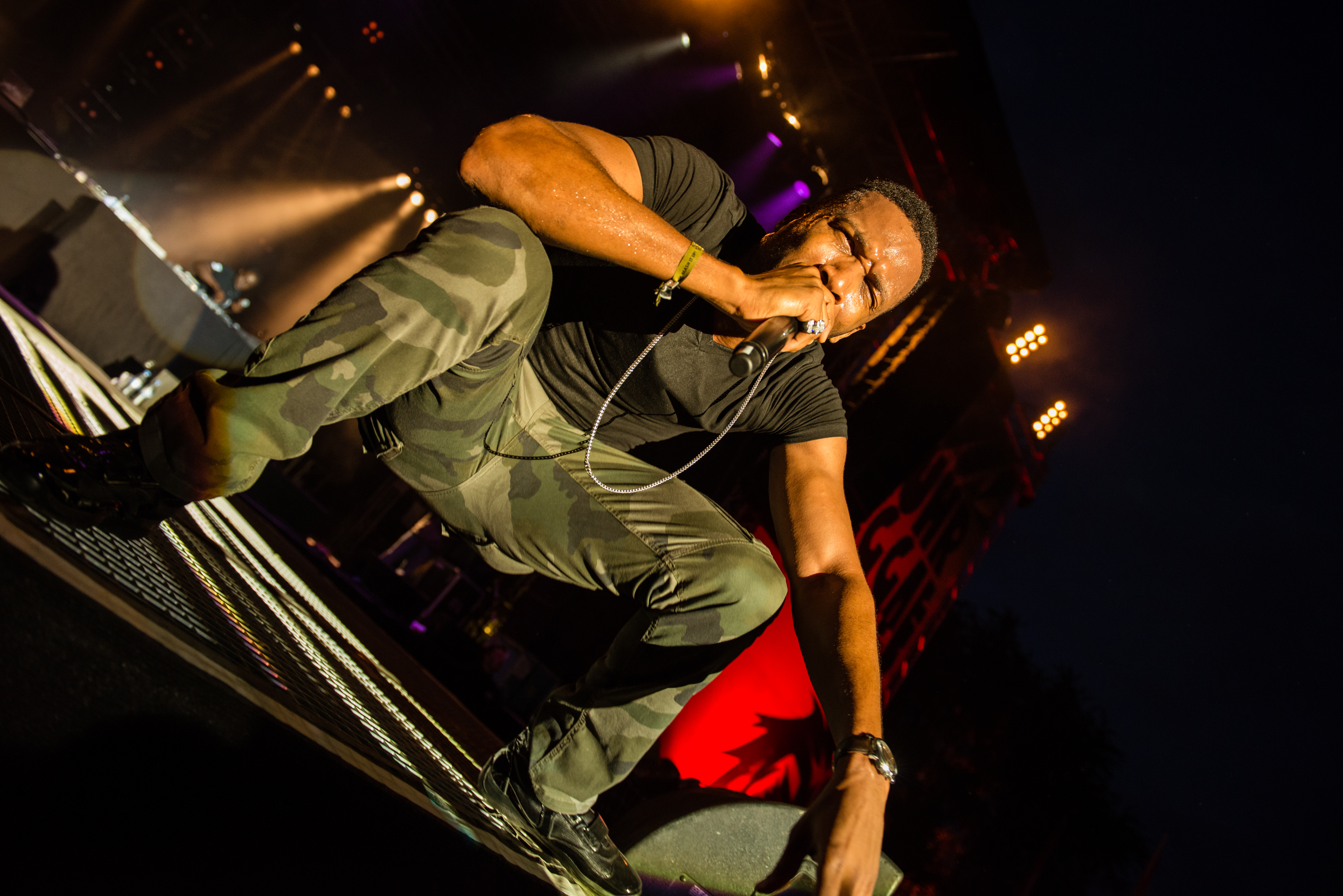
During West's verses, he is accompanied by Assassin on certain lines. The deejay also contributes a verse, after having recorded different ones at Gee Jam Studios.

Musically, "I'm in It" is a hip hop, dancehall, industrial, and trap track, with elements of reggae, techno, and punk rock. It features a sample of Lattimore's "Lately". The song contains screeching synthesizers, percussion, and fast-paced snare drums. It features dog bark sounds, which are incorporated low into the mix. The song also includes "Oh" vocals, as crafted by Tammy Infusino and Ken Lewis. It features a pulse when the beat drops following the chorus, with a tempo of around 70 beats per minute. West raps in a melancholy voice that is chopped and screwed, being distorted to an aggressive tone. A verse is contributed from Assassin, who also delivers lines next to West's verses and crooning is contributed from Vernon; he sings the chorus with West.

In the lyrics of "I'm in It", West details a sexual fantasy of a night with his then-wife Kim Kardashian. The highly explicit content was noted by numerous publications, with Pitchfork and The Daily Telegraph seeing it as XXX-rated. West proclaims "Thank God almighty, free at last" in reference to Kardashian unveiling her breasts, alluding to Martin Luther King Jr.'s 1963 speech. He demands sweet and sour sauce as he raps about cunnilingus with an Asian women and also quirks about making a girl scream "AAAAAAH-a-a-a-a-a!", then repeatedly asserts "That's right, I'm in it" as he is accompanied by Assassin every few lines. The deejay also mentions his "bad man ting", while Vernon calls out a "star fucker" during the bridge. In the final verse, West declares that he cannot abandon nightlife in spite of being married with children and admits to sleeping with his nightlight on, concluding that he speaks "Swag-hili".

== Release and reception ==
"I'm In It" was included as the sixth track on West's sixth studio album, Yeezus, released on June 18, 2013, through his labels Def Jam and Roc-A-Fella. The song was met with polarized reviews from music critics, with split assessments of the sexual content. Ryan Reed from Paste identified West and Vernon as the album's best collaboration, labeling the song a "disturbing sex rap" backed by snares as West references Kardashian's breasts and goes "for condoms like a ninja". Writing for AllMusic, David Jeffries was taken aback by the song's "punkish, irresponsible blast-femy" as West articulates his dreams at his loudest during the sexual lyrics. The staff of Billboard noted that West "mangles his voice and flips to beast mode" for the content, beginning at a slow pace and transitioning into "a dancehall romp". Ryan Dombal of Pitchfork noted the song's heavy explicitness and that it sounds like "a dancehall orgasm mired in quicksand", making West's similar songs such as "Slow Jamz" (2003) seem like Disney theme songs, while he considered the sweet and sour line to come across as oafishness. HipHopDX reviewer Justin Hunte thought that the song's club-appropriate sexual lyrics, reggae influences, and "Swag-hili" line make it "quickly embed itself Indian-style into the eardrum". Jon Dolan of Rolling Stone wrote that the song resembles the soundtrack of "a snuff film for Cylons" and said that in the lyrics, West "sounds at once righteous and evil". At PopMatters, David Amidon was interested in certain lyrics from West and found imagining him asleep with his nightlight on to be fun, while he stated Assassin goes "in and out of the beat like a pirate ship on the high seas". However, Amidon believed that listeners will take time to appreciate the song and West should have articulated a response to Ray J's "I Hit It First" without its incoherent last verse.

Providing a less enthusiastic review for The New York Times, Jon Pareles stated that West enacts the black stereotype of "the insatiable superstud, callous and lewd", who uses women for sexual means. He noted that West adds "a little blasphemy" for a reaction, despite not seeing any achievement in being smarter than "hip-hop's many other raunchmongers". In the Los Angeles Times, Randall Roberts was both surprised and impressed with West's reference to King's speech, although expressed that the song "could be called bawdy were it not so lyrically dark". In a mixed review, Jesal "Jay Soul" Padania from RapReviews felt that the "quick-quick-slow dancefloor fuck song" is highly explicit to varying levels of success, criticizing how West's misogyny resembles fellow rapper Lil Wayne's I Am Not a Human Being II (2013). Forrest Cardamenis of No Ripcord wrote off West's mixed messaging with his "racially-charged lyrics" as he sexually references King's speech and a civil rights sign, making a historical error as the Black Panther Party's sign was instead a closed fist. Referencing the latter line for NME, Gavin Haynes questioned if there would be "a more sacrilegious moment in 2013" and he also found a lack of meaning in the title of "I'm in It". On a similar note, The Fly's Alex Denney called West misogynistic and hard to listen to as he seemingly places "the rap lexicon on the psychologist's sofa". For the Chicago Tribune, Greg Kot was irritated with West for his sweet and sour sauce line that takes part in "the kind of transgressive 'humor'" of artists of a lesser caliber. Gary Suarez of The Quietus thought that West went too far with the line, which he called the "most tasteless joke" on Yeezus.

Upon the release of the album, "I'm in It" debuted at number 17 on the US Billboard Bubbling Under Hot 100. It also entered the US Hot R&B/Hip-Hop Songs chart at number 43.

== Live performances and appearances in media ==
West incorporated five spelled-out segments into The Yeezus Tour (2013–14), performing "I'm in It" during the third segment "Falling". He wore a tunic made from spare green military material with a large number of pockets for the performance, while men in body suits walked around him.

Within the same week of the album's release, a remix of the song was released by DMNDZ. A trap remix, it adds prominent 808s and hi-hats. Faceasaurus Rex also shared their "Swaghili Remix", based in the same genre with heavy bass. Tinashe premiered her track "Vulnerable" in November 2013, featuring a verse from rapper Travis Scott that interpolates "I'm in It". In spite of his admiration for West, Canadian musician Drake criticized his "Swaghili" line and said that even fellow rapper Fabolous "wouldn't say some shit like that" in a February 2014 interview.

== Credits and personnel ==
Credits are adapted from the album's liner notes.

Recording

- Engineering at No Name Hotel (Paris), Gee Jam Studios (Port Antonio, Jamaica), Real World Studios (Bath, England) and Shangri-La (Malibu, CA)
- Assistant engineering at Studios de la Seine (Paris), Real World Studios (Bath, England), Gee Jam Studios (Port Antonio, Jamaica) and Shangri-La (Malibu, CA)
- Mix and assistant mixing at Shangri-La (Malibu, CA)

Personnel

- Kanye West – songwriter, production
- Evian Christ – songwriter, co-production
- Mike Dean – songwriter, additional production, recording engineer
- Justin Vernon – songwriter, additional vocals
- Assassin – songwriter, additional vocals
- Malik Jones – songwriter
- Cydel Young – songwriter
- Sakiya Sandifer – songwriter
- Elon Rutberg – songwriter
- Andre Harris – songwriter
- Jill Scott – songwriter
- Vidal Davis – songwriter
- Carvin Haggins – songwriter
- Kenny Lattimore – songwriter
- Dom $olo – co-production
- Noah Goldstein – additional production, recording engineer, mix engineer
- Arca – additional production
- Tammy Infusino – vocal effects
- Ken Lewis – vocal effects
- Brent Kolatalo – vocal effects engineer
- Anthony Kilhoffer – recording engineer
- Marc Portheau – assistant recording engineer
- Khoï Huynh – assistant recording engineer
- Raoul Le Pennec – assistant recording engineer
- Nabil Essemlani – assistant recording engineer
- Keith Parry – assistant recording engineer
- Mat Arnold – assistant recording engineer
- Dale – assistant recording engineer
- Sean Oakley – assistant recording engineer, assistant mix engineer
- Eric Lynn – assistant recording engineer, assistant mix engineer
- Dave "Squirrel" Covell – assistant recording engineer, assistant mix engineer
- Josh Smith – assistant recording engineer, assistant mix engineer

== Charts ==
Chart performance for "I'm in It"
Chart (2013)	Peak position
US Bubbling Under Hot 100 (Billboard)	17
US Hot R&B/Hip-Hop Songs (Billboard)	43
US On-Demand Streaming Songs (Billboard)	27
