= Blood on the Leaves =

Song by Kanye West

from the album Yeezus
- Released: June 18, 2013
- Recorded: January 26 – June 2013
- Genre: Hip-hop
- Length: 6:00
- Label: Roc-A-Fella; Def Jam
- Songwriters: Kanye West; Ross Birchard; Elon Rutberg; Malik Jones; Tony Williams; Cydel Young; Mike Dean; Lewis Allen
- Producers: Kanye West; Hudson Mohawke; Lunice; Carlos Broady (co.); 88-Keys (add.); Mike Dean (add.); Arca (add.)

Audio sample
- file; help

Yeezus track listing
- 10 tracks: 1. "On Sight"; 2. "Black Skinhead"; 3. "I Am a God"; 4. "New Slaves"; 5. "Hold My Liquor"; 6. "I'm in It"; 7. "Blood on the Leaves"; 8. "Guilt Trip"; 9. "Send It Up"; 10. "Bound 2"

"Blood on the Leaves" is a song by American rapper Kanye West from his sixth studio album Yeezus (2013). In the song, West presents his thoughts on how fame can cause the destruction of relationships, while making comparisons of contemporary times to the lynching of African Americans in the United States during the pre-civil rights era. West delivers his vocals through an Auto-Tune processor, like on his 2008 album 808s & Heartbreak. It contains samples of both singer Nina Simone's 1965 rendition of Billie Holiday's song "Strange Fruit", and "R U Ready" by the duo TNGHT, who co-produced the track.

The song received universal acclaim from music critics, with many commenting on its lyrical message and praising its samples. It was named one of the best tracks of 2013 by multiple publications. Pitchfork later placed the track on their list of the 200 best songs of the 2010s. Despite not being released as a single, the song managed to enter charts in the United States, United Kingdom, France, and Australia in 2013. A music video was set to be directed by American filmmaker David Lynch, but plans were abandoned. Since its release, West has performed the song live on multiple occasions, including at the 2013 MTV Video Music Awards and on the 2016 Saint Pablo Tour.

== Background and composition ==
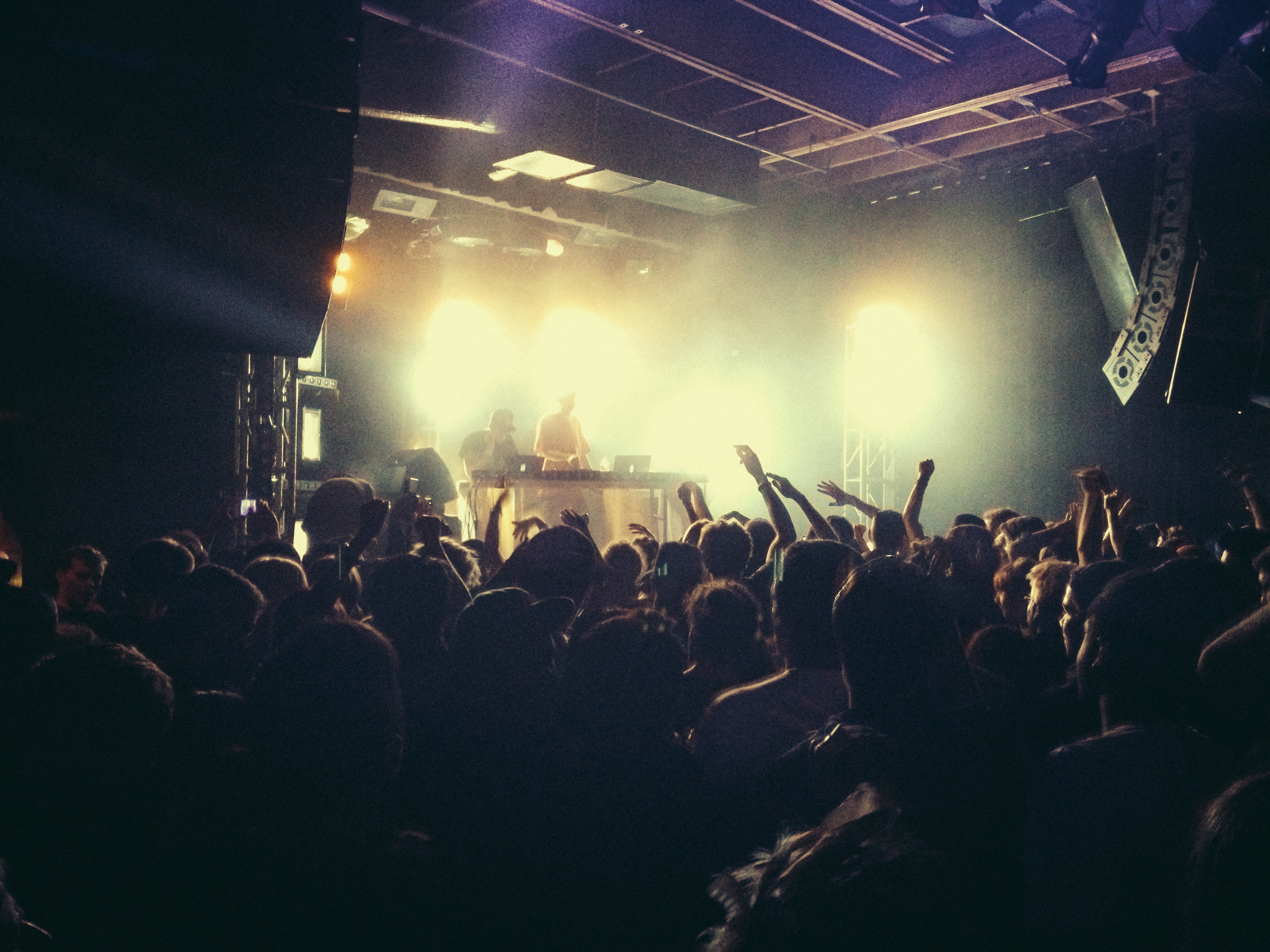
The song features production from musical duo TNGHT.

The song features production by the musical duo TNGHT, consisting of Scottish producer Hudson Mohawke and Canadian producer Lunice. Mohawke had previously worked with West on the 2012 GOOD Music collaboration "Mercy", along with other tracks on the compilation album Cruel Summer (2012). After working on Yeezus, Mohawke was introduced to an entirely new approach to songwriting. According to Mohawke, the duo's song "R U Ready", which is sampled in "Blood on the Leaves", was one of the first songs the two recorded together and was also one of the first pieces of music the duo sent to West to sample.

West had previously sampled the work of Nina Simone on the 808s & Heartbreak track "Bad News" and the Watch the Throne collaborative track "New Day" with Jay-Z. Rapper Travis Scott viewed West as "a genius" and the only person who would think of combining "Strange Fruit" with a Hudson Mohawke beat in the "crazy-ass song". When he first heard the combination, Travis Scott "was jumping on niggas' backs and shit, like, 'Ahhhh!'".

"Blood on the Leaves" is a hip-hop song in which West delivers his vocals through an Auto-Tune processor, similar to his 2008 album 808s & Heartbreak. The song begins with a sample of singer and civil rights activist Nina Simone's 1965 rendition of "Strange Fruit" by Billie Holiday over rolling piano chords, after which West's vocals begins. After one minute, the song unleashes horns taken from musical duo TNGHT's song "R U Ready", along with animal growls that play sporadically throughout the rest of the song. He later interpolates the hook of rapper C-Murder's 2000 song "Down for My N's." West's verses center around the perils of fame, conspicuous consumption and drug-addled romance. He raps lyrics which have been speculated as a possible reference to Jay-Z being unfaithful to his wife Beyoncé.

== Release ==
"Blood on the Leaves" was released on June 18, 2013, as the seventh track on West's sixth studio album Yeezus. According to Mohawke, "Blood on the Leaves" was originally intended to be the album's opener instead of "On Sight", but was changed "at the last minute" due to "the message ["On Sight"] puts across that [Yeezus] is a very different record." In November 2013, Mohawke announced via Twitter that the song was to-be released as the next single for the album, after "Bound 2" in August 2013. That same month, West subsequently announced the release during an appearance on 92.3 NOW. David Lynch stated his intentions to direct a music video for "Blood on the Leaves" due to his fondness for the song, but plans were abandoned after Lynch "never got [any] ideas."

== Critical reception ==
The song received universal acclaim from music critics, with many commenting on its lyrical message and praising its samples. When reviewing the album for HipHopDX, Justin Hunte wrote that "Blood on the Leaves" is "[the] one song [from Yeezus] that must be heard immediately." The staff of Popdust rated the song three and a half out of five, describing it as "an epic Yeezy tale about a relationship gone sour over issues of money and celebrity and bad timing and possibly even an unwanted child, depending on how you interpret the final verse." The song was branded by Jon Dolan of Rolling Stone as being "a buzzing, bluesy, static-y track." The song impressed director David Lynch: "I think it's one of the most modern pieces and so minimal, so powerful but at the same time so beautiful. It's a great, great song." Gil Kaufman of MTV called "Blood on the Leaves": "a churning anthem about conspicuous consumption" and: "[an] example of West's signature dichotomy in which he melds the sacred and profane." The original version of Nina Simone's "Strange Fruit" recorded by Billie Holiday in 1939 has been deemed: "shorthand for music that deals with racial injustice."

Ryan Dombal of Pitchfork called the song the "album pinnacle" and "a nightmarish story of divorce and betrayal," while Jody Rosen of Vulture stated that: "[West is] well aware how audacious to interpolate that sacred song into a monstrously self-pitying ... a melodrama about what a drag it is when your side-piece won't abort your love child." Critic Jon Pareles, writing for The New York Times, criticized the song for its use of the Simone sample and thematic repetition, calling it "a rehash, a squandered opportunity." Nicholas Troester of conservative magazine First Things labeled the song as an "anti-abortion anthem" and thought the focus of the song is: "the tremendous selfishness of adults who cannot understand the importance of families or children."

=== Accolades ===
The song was named among the best tracks of 2013 by multiple publications. Rolling Stone ranked the song at number 20 on their list of the 100 Best Songs of 2013. Pitchfork ranked the song at number 11 on their list of the 100 Best Songs of 2013, writing: "Blood on the Leaves", more than anything else on Yeezus, melds repulsive content and magnetic music into a strike that leaves the taste of real blood in your mouth" and calling it "a conceptual enigma." XXL magazine ranked the song at number 24 on their list of the 25 best songs of 2013, writing: "Mixing personal memories of a menacing relationship with the horrors of lynching for a record is often looked at as a blasphemous feat at first—but Kanye West made the combination work. Sampling Nina Simone's 'Strange Fruit', West's 'Blood on the Leaves'...was a gorgeous metaphor of a failed relationship touted with bass, towering horns, and auto-tune effect reminiscent of '808s & Heartbreak'." Spectrum Culture named it the 23rd best song of 2013, commenting;"it’s singles like “Blood on the Leaves” that offer fans a glimpse into the fears and insecurities of an artist who seems to always put forth a confident demeanour." Time Out listed "Blood on the Leaves" as West's 12th greatest song in March 2018. In 2019, Pitchfork ranked "Blood on the Leaves" at number 155 on their list of the 200 best songs of the 2010s, writing, "[The song] is a microcosm of what made Kanye both great and awful this decade", praising its beat, samples, vocals, and lyrics. Rolling Stone placed it at 75 on its list of the 100 best songs of the 2010s.

== Commercial performance ==
Upon the album's release, the track charted at number 91 on the US Billboard Hot 100 and disappeared from the chart afterwards until making a re-entry at its peak position of number 89 on September 14, 2013. The track charted at number 28 on the US Billboard Hot R&B/Hip-Hop Songs chart initially, then went on to peak at number 27 in the same week as reaching its peak position on the Hot 100 and spent a total of five weeks on the chart. "Blood on the Leaves" was certified Gold in the United States in 2015, despite West releasing no album that year. It was later certified Platinum in the United States in 2018. In France, the track debuted at number 131 on the SNEP chart upon the release of Yeezus. It entered at number 174 on the UK Singles Chart.

== Live performances ==
West performed the song live at the 2013 MTV Video Music Awards. He was originally supposed to perform "Black Skinhead", though changed to performing "Blood on the Leaves" instead shortly before the show. The performance was notable for its minimal lighting and forest-themed backdrop. Moments before taking the stage, West posted a photo of the backcloth on Twitter with the caption; "it's a tree that was used for lynching." Later he posted a message on his website, "This tree was used for lynching. Those who were murdered are buried in the ground around the tree. Blood on the leaves." The song was performed live by West on Later... with Jools Holland in September 2013; this performance was singled out for praise by Bruce Springsteen during an interview with NPR, who called it "fantastic". West omitted Jay-Z's name from the song's lyrics when performing it live at the X Games Austin 2014 Music Festival, where his name was also omitted from the lyrics of "Cold". Other live performances include Glastonbury in June 2015 and on the Saint Pablo Tour in August 2016.

== Cover version and remixes ==
American musician Raury covered the song during his appearance on Hot 97 in September 2014. A version titled "Blood on the Leaves" (DOGMA remix) was released in June 2013, which includes Nina Simone's vocals being mashed. American rapper Waka Flocka Flame freestyled over the song's instrumental in May 2014 as part of his weekly series of freestyles every Monday, leading up to the release of his third studio album Flockaveli 2. A remix of the song was shared by Nicolas Jaar in February 2016. American rapper YvngxChris used a similar chop of this sample for his song of the same name as West's song, which blew up on TikTok and would eventually get a remix with SSGKobe, Kashdami, UnoTheActivist, and Ken Carson.

== Credits and personnel ==
Credits adapted from the Yeezus liner notes.

- Kanye West – songwriter, producer
- Ross Birchard – songwriter, producer
- Elon Rutberg – songwriter
- Malik Jones – songwriter
- Tony Williams – songwriter
- Cydel Young – songwriter
- Mike Dean – songwriter, additional producer
- Lewis Allen – songwriter
- Lunice – producer
- Carlos Broady – co-producer
- 88-Keys – additional producer
- Arca – additional producer
- Noah Goldstein – engineer, mixer at Shangri-La Studios, Malibu, CA
- Anthony Kilhoffer – engineer
- Marc Portheau – assistant engineer
- Khoi Huynh – assistant engineer
- Raoul Le Pennec – assistant engineer
- Nabil Essemlani – assistant engineer
- Damien Prost – assistant engineer
- Keith Parry – assistant engineer
- Kenta Yonesaka – assistant engineer
- David Rowland – assistant engineer
- Sean Oakley – assistant engineer, assistant mixer
- Eric Lynn – assistant engineer, assistant mixer
- Dave "Squirrel" Covell – assistant engineer, assistant mixer
- Josh Smith – assistant engineer, assistant mixer

== Charts ==
Chart (2013)	Peak position
Australian Streaming Tracks (ARIA)	44
France (SNEP)	131
UK Singles (Official Charts Company)	174
UK Hip Hop/R&B (Official Charts)	38
US Billboard Hot 100	89
US Hot R&B/Hip-Hop Songs (Billboard)	27

== Certifications ==
Region	Certification	Certified units/sales
New Zealand (RMNZ)	Gold	15,000^{‡}
United Kingdom (BPI)	Silver	200,000^{‡}
United States (RIAA)	Platinum	1,000,000^{‡}
^{‡} Sales+streaming figures based on certification alone.
