= Guilt Trip (song) =

Song by Kanye West

from the album Yeezus
- Released: June 18, 2013
- Recorded: October 30, 2010; May 14, 2012 – June 2013
- Genre: Hip hop; electronica; experimental
- Length: 4:03
- Label: Roc-A-Fella; Def Jam
- Songwriters: Kanye West; Scott Mescudi; Cydel Young; Mike Dean; Larry Griffin, Jr.; Keith Elam; Kevin Hansford; Dupre Kelly; Chris Martin; Al-Terik Wardrick; Marlon Williams; Terrence Thornton; Tyree Pittman
- Producers: West; Dean; S1; Travis Scott (add.); Ackeejuice Rockers (add.)

Yeezus track listing
- 10 tracks: 1. "On Sight"; 2. "Black Skinhead"; 3. "I Am a God"; 4. "New Slaves"; 5. "Hold My Liquor"; 6. "I'm in It"; 7. "Blood on the Leaves"; 8. "Guilt Trip"; 9. "Send It Up"; 10. "Bound 2"

"Guilt Trip" is a song by American hip hop recording artist Kanye West, from his sixth studio album Yeezus (2013). It was produced by West, Mike Dean, S1, with an additional production credit for Travis Scott and Ackeejuice Rockers for the samples of "Chief Rocka" by Lords of the Underground and "Blocka" by Pusha T featuring Popcaan and Travis Scott. The song's lyrics deal with looking back at a failed relationship, similar to fellow Yeezus track "Blood on the Leaves". West sing-raps through an Auto-Tune processor, reminiscent of his 2008 album 808s & Heartbreak. The song includes vocals from rapper Kid Cudi, who later expressed negative opinions about his feature due to his vocals being recorded years prior.

Since release, "Guilt Trip" has received positive reviews from music critics, with multiple commenting on its melodic sound. The song charted at number 2 on the US Billboard Bubbling Under R&B/Hip-Hop Songs chart. West performed the song live on The Yeezus Tour in 2013.

== Background and development ==
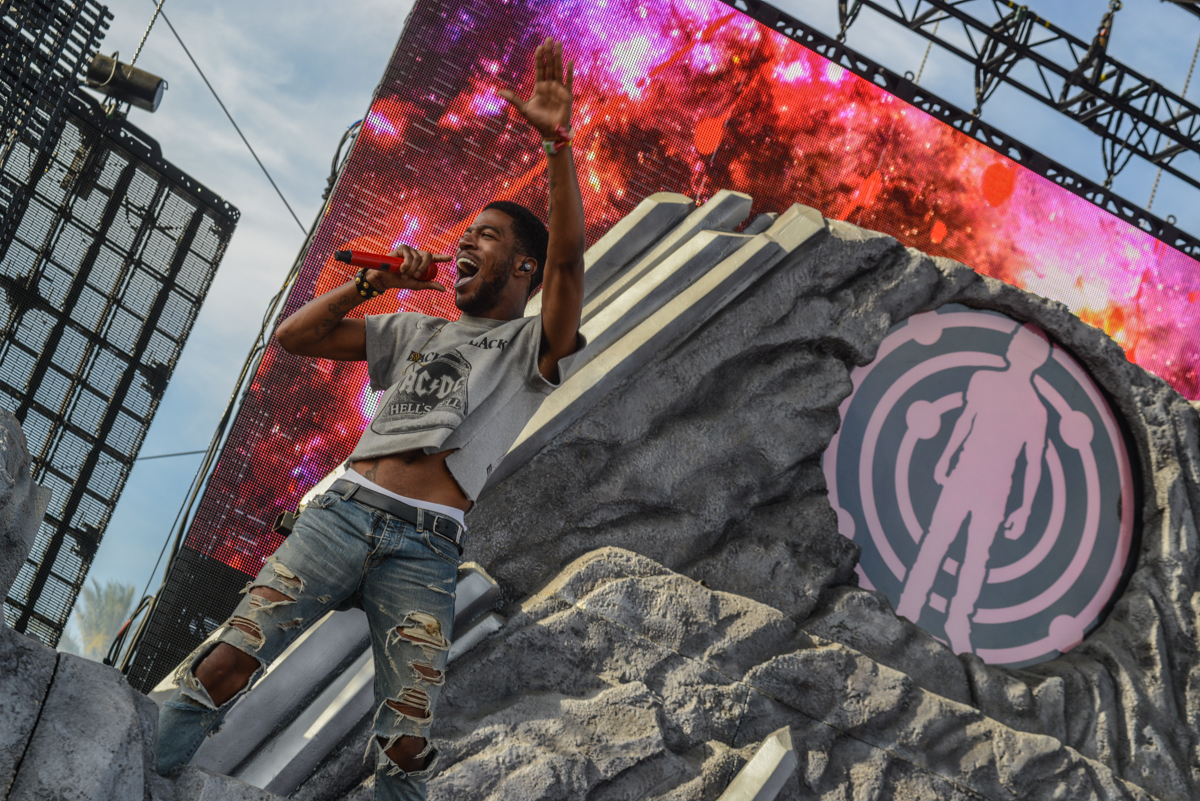
The song includes vocals by Kid Cudi (pictured in 2014), who later expressed negative opinions toward his appearance.

In October 2014, producer S1 revealed that he created the earliest version of the beat during sessions for West's collaboration album Watch the Throne (2011) with Jay-Z, who revealed that the song was originally intended for that album; a version exists with an unfinished verse by Jay-Z. After being passed on for that album, West revisited the song during the Yeezus sessions, reworking it with S1 and Mike Dean, and adding it to the final tracklist for Yeezus. West and Kid Cudi had collaborated on numerous tracks in the past, including the former's "Welcome to Heartbreak" and the latter's "Erase Me".

West began to use Auto-Tune on a regular basis with the release of his album 808s & Heartbreak in 2008. It eventually came to define the sound of West's music, with him using his own voice as an "instrument." The song's combining of hip hop with experimental music focuses on lyrics as being of a lesser importance, which West later did again in his 2016 single "Fade".

== Composition ==
"Guilt Trip"
The opening of "Guilt Trip" brings elements of electronic synths with melancholic vocals from West in Auto-Tune, earning critical acclaim.

"Guilt Trip" is a hip hop song that includes elements of experimental music in its instrumentation. The song, like other tracks on Yeezus, sees West looking back at a failed relationship; he delivers his vocals through both rapping and singing through an Auto-Tune processor, similar to his album 808s & Heartbreak. He delivers only one verse using the same rhyme scheme for over half of it, during which he namechecks several cultural references, including Jamaican dancehall musician Shabba Ranks, the song "Chief Rocka" by hip hop trio Lords of the Underground (of which the song also samples), and Star Wars character Chewbacca. On top of "Chief Rocka", the song also contains a sample of "Blocka" by rapper Pusha T featuring Popcaan and Travis Scott. The song's outro is sung by Kid Cudi, who asks the question, "If you loved me so much, then why'd you let me go?" West's reference to Chewbacca is one of numerous times the Star Wars franchise has been referenced in music.

== Release and reception ==
"Guilt Trip" was released on June 18, 2013, as the eighth track on West's sixth studio album Yeezus. The song received positive reviews from music critics, with the melodic sound garnering praise. The melody at the end of the song was described by Lou Reed, formerly of the Velvet Underground, as "so beautiful, it makes me so emotional, it brings tears to my eyes." When comparing the track to "Blood on the Leaves", the staff of Popdust described it as being "even closer to the 'Say You Will' or 'See You in My Nightmares' feel of [West's] 808s & Heartbreak LP." The site also praised West's verse and Kid Cudi's cameo, calling it "well-placed," concluding: "'Blood on the Leaves' might have the showier setup, but in the end, "Guilt Trip" is arguably the more moving song." The staff of Billboard looked at the track's position on the album as "a brief thumper with Kanye once again looking back at a failed relationship" and claimed for his vocals to be "delivered as a hybrid of raps and singing."

In an interview with Complex in February 2014, Kid Cudi revealed he had negative feelings about his feature, due to the vocals being a few years old. He also revealed West never told him he was going to be on the song; he found out via Twitter. He ultimately stated he felt "underused" on Yeezus and wished he wasn't on the song, due to him not being present at the recording sessions. Despite Kid Cudi's negative feelings toward his appearance, Charles Holmes of Complex placed the song at number two on the magazine's list of the best collaborations between West and Kid Cudi in August 2017, behind the 2010 song "Gorgeous". Holmes felt that the song "perfected" what the duo introduced on West's 2008 album 808s & Heartbreak – "an entire sub-genre of rap with their melodic and heartfelt lyrics." Holmes ultimately felt Kid Cudi wasn't underused, writing: "If time has taught us anything it is that in Kanye's hand 50 seconds of Cudi hums and melodic ruminations speak more than some artist's entire careers."

== Commercial performance ==
On the week of July 6, 2013, "Guilt Trip" peaked at number 2 on the US Billboard Bubbling Under R&B/Hip-Hop Songs chart, remaining on it for a total of two weeks. The same week, it peaked at number 39 on the US Billboard On-Demand Songs chart.

== Live performances ==
The song was performed live by West during the first concert of The Yeezus Tour at Seattle's KeyArena in October 2013. The next month, West performed it at the first concert in New York City on the tour at the Barclays Center. In December 2013, he delivered a live performance of "Guilt Trip" at the New Orleans Arena as part of The Yeezus Tour. During the performance, anonymous female figures wearing robes braided themselves around him. The figures were also involved with West's performance of "I Am a God" during the concert, holding him aloft. In 2016, Kid Cudi performed his verse at Coachella, which he stated in 2017 would be his last time.

== Credits and personnel ==
Credits adapted from the Yeezus liner notes.

- Songwriter – Kanye West, Scott Mescudi, Cydel Young, Mike Dean, Larry Griffin, Jr., Keith Elam, Kevin Hansford, Dupre Kelly, Chris Martin, Al-Terik Wardrick, Marlon Williams, Terrence Thornton, Tyree Pittman
- Producer – Kanye West and Mike Dean #MWA
- Additional production – Travis Scott and Ackee Juice Rockers
- Additional programming – Noah Goldstein
- Additional instruments (cello) – Chris "Hitchcock" Chorney
- Engineer – Noah Goldstein, Anthony Kilhoffer, and Mike Dean
- Mix – Noah Goldstein at Shangri-La Studios, Malibu, CA
- Mix assisted – Sean Oakley, Eric Lynn, Dave "Squirrel" Covell, and Josh Smith

== Charts ==
Chart (2013)	Peak position
US Bubbling Under R&B/Hip-Hop Songs (Billboard)	2
US On-Demand Streaming Songs (Billboard)	39
