= Bound 2 =

Single by Kanye West

from the album Yeezus
- Released: August 28, 2013
- Recorded: January 7, 2012 – 2013
- Genre: Hip-hop; progressive rap; chipmunk soul
- Length: 3:49
- Label: Def Jam; GOOD
- Songwriters: Kanye West; John Stephens; Charles Wilson; Che Pope; Elon Rutberg; Cydel Young; Malik Jones; Sakiya Sandifer; Mike Dean; Norman Whiteside; Bob Massey; Robert Dukes; Ronnie Self
- Producers: Kanye West; Che Pope; Eric Danchick; Goldstein; No I.D.; Mike Dean

Kanye West singles chronology
"Black Skinhead" (2013)	"Bound 2" (2013)	"Thank You" (2013)

Music video
- "Bound 2" on YouTube

Audio
- "Bound 2" on YouTube

Yeezus track listing
- 10 tracks: 1. "On Sight"; 2. "Black Skinhead"; 3. "I Am a God"; 4. "New Slaves"; 5. "Hold My Liquor"; 6. "I'm in It"; 7. "Blood on the Leaves"; 8. "Guilt Trip"; 9. "Send It Up"; 10. "Bound 2"

"Bound 2" is a song by American rapper Kanye West, featured as the final track from his sixth studio album, Yeezus (2013). It was produced by West and Che Pope, with additional production being handled by Eric Danchick, Noah Goldstein, No I.D. and Mike Dean. The song features vocals from American soul singer Charlie Wilson and serves as the album's second single. "Bound 2" incorporates samples from "Bound" by Ponderosa Twins Plus One and the lines "Uh-huh, honey" and "Alright" from Brenda Lee's "Sweet Nothin's". The song also interpolates Wee’s "Aeroplane (Reprise)" for the bridge, sung by Charlie Wilson.

"Bound 2" received universal acclaim from music critics, who referred to the song as one of the highlights of the album, comparing its soul influenced, sample-based production to West's debut studio album, The College Dropout (2004). The song peaked at number 55 on the UK Singles Chart and 12 on the US Billboard Hot 100 chart. The song received two nominations at the 57th Annual Grammy Awards for Best Rap Song and Best Rap/Sung Performance. West performed the song live on Later... with Jools Holland and The Tonight Show Starring Jimmy Fallon.

== Background and composition ==
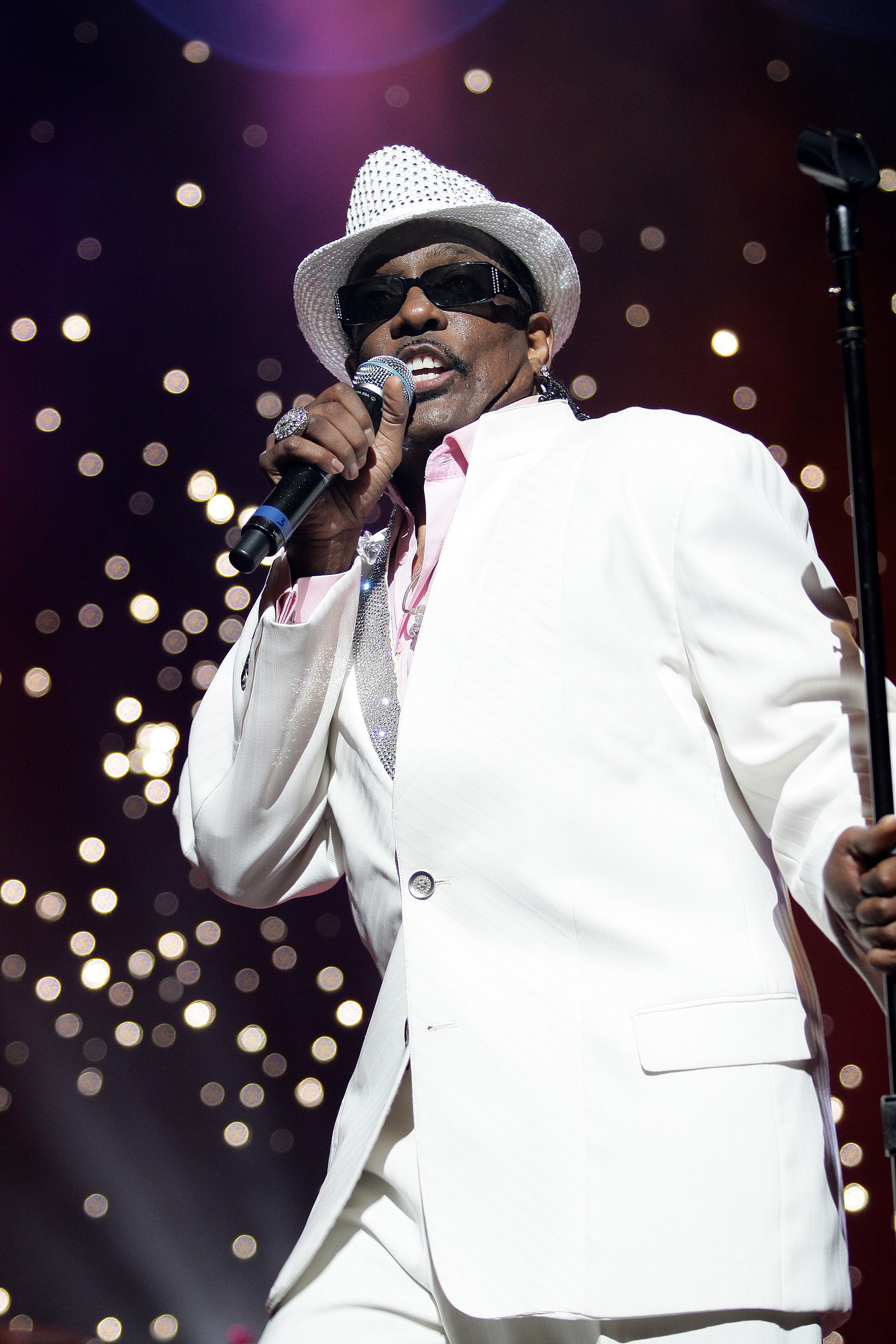
Soul singer Charlie Wilson appears uncredited on the song and performed it with West numerous times, upon its single release.

On June 1, 2013, West revealed the cover art of his sixth studio album Yeezus and premiered a 13-second preview of "Bound 2". It was one of three songs that were previewed prior to the album's release, the others being "New Slaves" and "Black Skinhead".

The instrumental of "Bound 2" is heavily based around soul samples, which critics noted as reminiscent of West's production style in his earlier work. The song is predominantly built around a sample taken from "Bound", a song by soul group Ponderosa Twins Plus One from their 1971 album, 2 + 2 + 1 = Ponderosa Twins Plus One. Interpolations from "Aeroplane (Reprise)", written by Norman Whiteside and performed by Wee, and the lines "Uh-huh, honey" and "All right" from the song "Sweet Nothin's", written by Ronnie Self and performed by country singer Brenda Lee, were also used in the song. Lee reacted to the sampling of her song on the track, saying:

As I've said, it's always nice to be recognized. It says a wonderful thing about Ronnie Self, who wrote the song. That 50 years after it was written, somebody in Kanye's camp knew the song and said, 'Let's use it.' That's a compliment to Ronnie.

In an interview with Rolling Stone, Rick Rubin explained how the song was constructed:

The whole song was written without that main sample; it was a last-minute thing. The song had kind of a lot of R&B music in it. And Kanye gave marching orders of "Take out anything you want, but don't add. Just take away." Like, "OK." And before that, we listened to the sample together and thought, "Hmm, maybe there's a way to integrate this into the song." So we started by getting the sample to work in the song, and then taking out as much stuff as we could, and then in the chorus reducing what was this whole musical thing, just this sort of one ugly, distorted bass note. I was thinking like Alan Vega and Suicide, that kind of noise-synth minimal vibe. So that was the idea behind the chorus: Take it from this sort of R&B thing and turn it into this kind of post-punk, edge thing. And the lyrics he wrote were so good and funny. It just turned into a really good record. The sample is so good.

On February 15, 2014, Hudson Mohawke played an original version of "Bound 2" during a DJ set in Leeds. The earlier version features piano-driven production and a much more stripped down ending compared to the album version. Rapper Tyler, the Creator revealed over Twitter that he helped produce the original version along with Mohawke.

== Release and promotion ==
"Bound 2" was released on June 18, 2013, as the tenth and final track on West's sixth studio album Yeezus. The song was revealed to be the second single released from Yeezus in August 2013, following "Black Skinhead". On September 9, 2013, West appeared on Late Night with Jimmy Fallon for the first time, to promote his upcoming Yeezus Tour. During his appearance, he performed "Bound 2" with Charlie Wilson, the Roots and a male children's choir. It was his first national television performance of the song. The song was also performed on the season premiere of Later... with Jools Holland by West and Wilson on September 17, 2013. To take a more minimal approach, they were accompanied by just the song's signature Ponderosa Twins sample and a brief piano intro for the Later... with Jools Holland performance.

== Reception ==
=== Critical response ===
"Bound 2"
The first 24-second sample of "Bound 2" that showcases the iconic sampling style that brings a homage to West's early production.

"Bound 2" received universal acclaim from music critics. Rolling Stone described "Bound 2" as "maybe the most audacious song he's ever written, not to mention the most beautiful." Julian Kimble of Complex called the song "a brilliant way to end the album" and wrote that it "stands out as a love song—a dark, twisted fantasy of a love song, perhaps, but one that's beautiful in its own way". David Jeffries of AllMusic described "Bound 2" as a "new wave beauty of a closer". Writing for The A.V. Club, Evan Rytlewski referred to the song as "an overt homage to West's bright early production, reimagining The College Dropout's cheerful chipmunk soul". Dan Buyanovsky of XXL called it the album's "emotional and musical highlight... a perfect sendoff that reminds you of Kanye's roots while pointing you in the direction of his future". A writer for the Kitsap Sun cited "Bound 2" as a "classic Yeezy effort" and "arguably the album's best track".

=== Accolades ===
XXL positioned it at number 17 on their list of the best songs of 2013. They said, "'Bound 2' showed the doubters that he could still give them the soul-soaked laments that everyone wanted, he just decided not to. But that doesn't mean this song is a throwaway—the video might be more of one than the song itself—this is Kanye's introspection colliding with his self-doubt in a way that is eminently relatable to anyone with a pulse." NME ranked "Bound 2" at number 22 on their list of the 50 best songs of 2013; "in Kanye's mind this is what constituted a pop song: sped up '70s soul samples, a totally unconventional structure and lyrical gems." Pitchfork Media positioned "Bound 2" at number 40 on their list of the top 100 tracks of 2013. They commented, "On an album that takes itself awful seriously throughout, 'Bound 2' is something that recontextualizes the entire affair, leaving more questions than answers." Belgium magazine Le Vif/L'Express named it the seventh best song of 2013. PopMatters placed it 15th on its list of the best songs of 2013. Swedish newspaper Expressen named it the 22nd best song of 2013. "Bound 2" was ranked 9th place on the annual Pazz & Jop critics songs poll.

In end of decade lists, i-D placed it 21st on its list of "The 30 Hip-Hop Tracks that Defined the 2010s", commenting; "Having reached his artistic and technical peak somewhere around the 7 minute mark of the monumental 'Runaway', Kanye began taking his creations apart to show how they worked. This consciously self-de(con)structive streak produced diminishing returns as the decade progressed but on something like 'Bound 2' it felt genuinely transgressive—the lush, dusty soul samples of 'the old Kanye' but artificial-seeming (like that ludicrous green screen music video) and jarring; clever-dumb lyrics that mashed together the crude ('don't get spunk on the mink') and the affecting ('I'm tired, you tired / Jesus wept') in the space of a few bars."

Rolling Stone listed it at 65th on its list of the 100 best songs of the 2010s, stating; "Seventy-six seconds into 'On Sight', the gleefully abrasive opener to Kanye West's gleefully abrasive Yeezus, he says (via choral sample) that he intends to give the audience what they need, not what they want. For the next 35 minutes, he does just that, coarsening his textures into something industrial and vital and new. Then, just to prove he can, West brings the beauty back. Over a roughly looped sample of the Ponderosa Twins Plus One—with occasional interjections from Brenda Lee and Charlie Wilson—West returns to his roguish side, penning a filthy ode to his new wife at the time, Kim Kardashian West. There's a reason we’re still paying attention to West after the decade he's had; he's always capable of something you never see coming."

== Music video ==
In the music video, a topless Kim Kardashian sits on West's lap as he rides a motorcycle.

On November 16, 2013, it was revealed that West would be premiering the music video for "Bound 2" on The Ellen DeGeneres Show the following week. The Nick Knight-directed music video was released on November 19, 2013. The video features his then-fiancée Kim Kardashian, topless, riding atop West's motorbike (Honda CRF-X) through Monument Valley and other landscapes. Eric Diep of XXL described it as, "a confident display of love and passion with little to no narrative". Spin felt it was "a pretty bad idea seen through so completely that it stops being a bad idea". Tom Breihan from Stereogum found the video confusing, saying "it'll take a little bit to figure out what all's going on there". Lanre Bakare of The Guardian described it as "self-indulgent, idiosyncratic and a bit weird". By the time that it had reached seven million views on YouTube, the music video's 13,000 likes were outbalanced by the 50,000 dislikes.

In an interview with The Breakfast Club West explained the concept for the video.

"I wanted to take white trash T-shirts and make it into a video. I wanted it to look as phony as possible, I wanted the clouds to go one direction, the mountains to go one direction, the horses to go over there, cause I want to show you that this is The Hunger Games. I want to show you that this is the type of imagery that's been presented to all of us. And the only difference is a black dude in the middle of it."

On November 25, 2013, "Bound 3", a parody of the music video was released, starring actors James Franco and Seth Rogen. The parody is a shot-for-shot remake, filmed while they were shooting their movie The Interview. Afterwards, Kim Kardashian revealed through Twitter that she and West found the video to be very funny. On December 11, 2013, the music video was parodied in the South Park episode "The Hobbit", where West is shown trying to convince the world that Kardashian is not a hobbit. On December 21, 2013, the video was parodied on Saturday Night Live, with cast members portraying the couple having sex while riding a red-nosed reindeer.

Slant Magazine listed it 15th on its list of the best music videos of 2013, commenting; "Wherein Kanye continues to dismantle white American iconography, subverting it by placing himself (and his topless reality star of a honey) in the middle of it all. This is Kanye deconstructing Marlon Brando, James Dean, and Elvis all at once while instilling fear of a black planet."

== Lawsuit ==
On December 23, 2013, Ricky Spicer of the Ponderosa Twins Plus One filed a lawsuit against West over the sample of the group's song, "Bound", alleging that he used Spicer's voice without permission. Spicer asked that West pay him or cease and desist using his vocals. Roc-A-Fella Records, Universal Music Group, Island Def Jam, and Rhino Entertainment were all named in the lawsuit along with West. The suit was settled in May 2015.

== Commercial performance ==
Despite not being released as a single initially, "Bound 2" managed to debut at number five on the US Billboard Bubbling Under Hot 100 and number 31 on the US Hot R&B/Hip-Hop Songs chart upon the release of Yeezus. After its release as a single, the song debuted at number 73 on the US Billboard Hot 100 on December 7, 2013. It re-entered at number 24 on the US Hot R&B/Hip-Hop Songs chart in the same week. On the Billboard Hot 100, the song reached its peak position of number twelve the following week.

On the UK Singles Chart, the song debuted at number 94 on September 15, 2013, having been released as a single recently. It peaked at number 55 the following week. A Drum and bass re-working titled "Nobody to Love" by Sigma topped several charts including the UK in 2014.

== Awards and nominations ==
Awards
Year	Organization	Award	Result	Ref.
2013	Antville Music Video Awards	Best Hip-Hop Video	Nominated	
2014	MuchMusic Video Awards	International Video of the Year – Artist	Nominated	
2015	Grammy Awards	Best Rap/Sung Collaboration	Nominated	
2015	Grammy Awards	Best Rap Song	Nominated	

== Remixes ==
British drum and bass duo Sigma created a remix of the song entitled "Nobody to Love" featuring vocals from Daniel Pearce which was officially released on April 6, 2014. It topped the UK Singles Chart upon release, with sales of over 121,000 copies in the first week. Rick Ross freestyled over the instrumental of "Bound 2" on January 1, 2014.

== Credits and personnel ==
Credits adapted from the liner notes of Yeezus.

- Delbert Bowers – assistant mixing
- Eric Danchick – additional production
- Mike Dean – bass, guitar, songwriting, additional producer
- Robert Dukes – songwriting
- Nabil Essemlani – assistant engineer
- Chris Galland – assistant mixing
- Noah Goldstein – engineer, additional producer
- Khoï Huynh – assistant engineer
- Malik Jones – songwriting
- Anthony Kilhoffer – engineer
- Manny Marroquin – mixing
- Bob Massey – songwriting
- No I.D. – additional production
- Keith Parry – assistant engineer
- Raoul Le Pennec – assistant engineer
- Che Pope – co-producer, songwriting
- Elon Rutberg – songwriting
- Sakiya Sandifer – songwriting
- Ronnie Self – songwriting
- John Stephens – songwriting
- Kanye West – lead vocals, producer, songwriting
- Norman Whiteside – songwriting
- Charlie Wilson – additional vocals, songwriting
- Cydel Young – songwriting

== Charts ==
=== Weekly charts ===
2013 weekly chart performance for "Bound 2"
Chart (2013)	Peak position
Australia (ARIA)	56
Belgium (Ultratip Bubbling Under Flanders)	53
Belgium (Ultratop Flanders Urban)	44
Canada Hot 100 (Billboard)	74
Ireland (IRMA)	68
Mexico Ingles Airplay (Billboard)	49
UK Singles (Official Charts)	55
UK Hip Hop/R&B (Official Charts)	10
US Billboard Hot 100	12
US Hot R&B/Hip-Hop Songs (Billboard)	3

2022 weekly chart performance for "Bound 2"
Chart (2022)	Peak position
Australia (ARIA)	50
Global 200 (Billboard)	104
Iceland (Tónlistinn)	17
Lithuania (AGATA)	88
Netherlands (Single Tip)	17
Portugal (AFP)	180
Sweden (Sverigetopplistan)	89

=== Year-end charts ===
2014 year-end chart performance for "Bound 2"
Chart (2014)	Position
US Hot R&B/Hip-Hop Songs (Billboard)	71

== Certifications ==
Certifications for "Bound 2"
Region	Certification	Certified units/sales
Australia (ARIA)	3× Platinum	210,000^{‡}
Denmark (IFPI Danmark)	Platinum	90,000^{‡}
Italy (FIMI)	Gold	50,000^{‡}
New Zealand (RMNZ)	4× Platinum	120,000^{‡}
Portugal (AFP)	Gold	10,000^{‡}
United Kingdom (BPI)	2× Platinum	1,200,000^{‡}
United States (RIAA)	6× Platinum	6,000,000^{‡}
^{‡} Sales+streaming figures based on certification alone.

== Release history ==
Release history and formats for "Bound 2"
Region	Date	Format	Label
Australia	September 13, 2013	Contemporary hit radio	Def Jam
