= Send It Up =

2013 song by Kanye West

Song by Kanye West

from the album Yeezus
- Released: June 18, 2013
- Recorded: February 24 – June 2013
- Genre: Industrial hip hop; electronic
- Length: 2:58
- Label: Roc-A-Fella; Def Jam
- Songwriters: Kanye West; Louis Johnson; Guy-Manuel de Homem-Christo; Thomas Bangalter; Alejandra Ghersi; Mike Levy; Sakiya Sandifer; Ab Liva; Elon Rutberg; Mike Dean; Moses Davis; Colin York; Lowell Dunbar
- Producers: West; Daft Punk; Gesaffelstein (co.); Brodinski (co.); Arca (add.); Dean (add.)

Audio video
- "Send It Up" on YouTube

Yeezus track listing
- 10 tracks: 1. "On Sight"; 2. "Black Skinhead"; 3. "I Am a God"; 4. "New Slaves"; 5. "Hold My Liquor"; 6. "I'm in It"; 7. "Blood on the Leaves"; 8. "Guilt Trip"; 9. "Send It Up"; 10. "Bound 2"

"Send It Up" is a song by American hip hop recording artist Kanye West, from his sixth studio album Yeezus (2013). It was produced by West, Daft Punk, Gesaffelstein, Brodinski, Arca and Mike Dean. Like other songs on the album, it features an industrial hip hop sound, with elements of electronic music. The song features vocals from American rapper King Louie, who improvised his contributions. It contains a sample of "Memories" (also known as "Stop Live Inna de Pass") by Jamaican reggae and dancehall singer Beenie Man. Eight days before its release on the album, West performed the song live at the Governors Ball Music Festival, along with four other tracks from Yeezus.

"Send It Up" received positive reviews from music critics, with many complimenting the production and party appeal. Despite not being released as a single, it entered Billboard's Hot R&B/Hip-Hop Songs and On-Demand Songs charts, at numbers 50 and 42, respectively. One line in the song was changed to being rapped a cappella when West reworked the Apple Music version of Yeezus in 2016. It was covered by punk rock band Idles in 2018.

== Background and composition ==
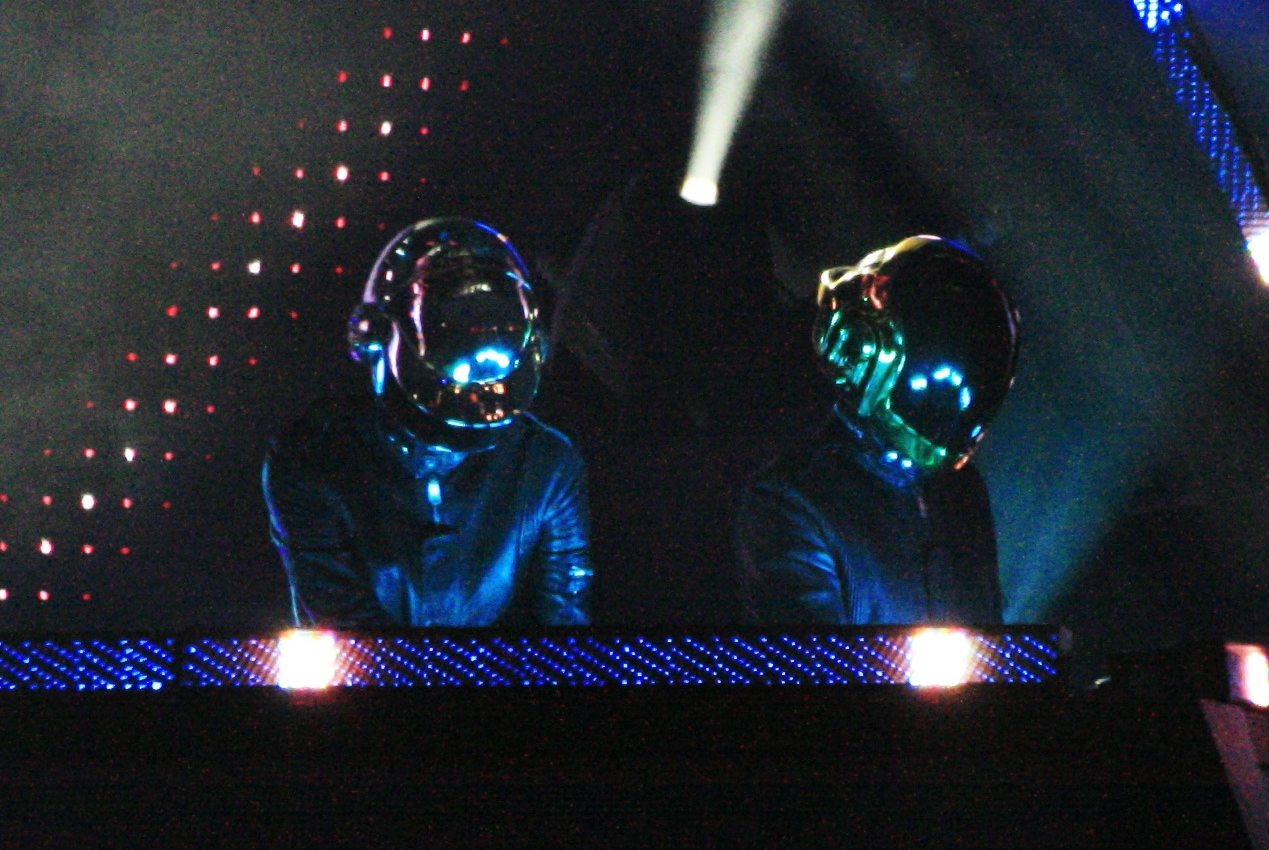
The song was co-produced by French electronic duo Daft Punk.

Before they collaborated for the first time on "Send It Up", American rapper King Louie found out West was a fan of his after West gave him a shoutout in the 2012 GOOD Music collaboration "I Don't Like (Remix)", featuring Chief Keef, Pusha T, Big Sean, and Jadakiss. King Louie called the shoutout "crazy" and appreciated his ability to influence Chicago-based rappers. Along with his vocal appearance on "Send It Up", King Louie also has a writing credit on another Yeezus track, "New Slaves".

"Send It Up" is an industrial hip hop song, with elements of electronic music. According to MTV's Rob Markman, the song contains a "kinetic" beat, with "blaring sirens" and "a pounding drum." It features vocals from King Louie, who freestyled his entire verse. King Louie later explained on MTV News that the song's beat was different than he originally recorded: "the beat was just one instrument, two instruments and then now it's like a whole party thing." However, he called the final version "dope." The song was co-produced by French electronic duo Daft Punk, who also co-produced the other Yeezus tracks "On Sight," "Black Skinhead," and "I Am a God." For the chorus, which repeats twice at the end of the song, West added a sample of "Memories" (also known as "Stop Live Inna de Pass") by Jamaican reggae and dancehall singer Beenie Man.

When West began to make adjustments to the songs on his seventh studio album The Life of Pablo (2016), he did the same to "Black Skinhead" and "Send It Up" for the Apple Music version of Yeezus (the Spotify and Tidal versions of the songs remained unchanged). On "Send It Up", West cut the instrumental backing track to his line at the 1:30 mark, making it a cappella.

== Release and promotion ==
"Send It Up" was released on June 18, 2013, as the ninth and penultimate track on West's sixth studio album Yeezus. Eight days before its release, on June 10, 2013, West performed live at the Governors Ball Music Festival; his set included five songs from the then-upcoming album, including "New Slaves", "Black Skinhead", and "I Am a God". While "Send It Up" and "On Sight" were played, their titles were not introduced; West instead introduced them as "new shit." The song was performed at the opening show of the Yeezus Tour in Seattle's KeyArena. A cover version was performed by punk rock band IDLES on BBC Radio 1 in August 2018.

=== Commercial performance ===
"Send It Up" was one of the album's least-performing songs. Upon the release of Yeezus, the song debuted at number 50 on the US Billboard Hot R&B/Hip-Hop Songs chart the week of July 6, 2013. The same week, it peaked at number 42 on the US Billboard On-Demand Songs chart.

== Critical reception ==
Since release, the song has received positive reviews from music critics, with many complimenting its production and party appeal. Rob Markman of MTV News gave the track a positive review, calling it "a clear-cut party starter." Alexis Petridis of The Guardian wrote, "the mid-tempo four-to-the-floor thud of "Send It Up" is strafed with electronic squeals and bursts of menacing, growling bass," as well as pointing out the track's "dance influences." Michael Madden of Consequence of Sound described its sound as being reminiscent of the work done by DJ Mustard and the Nine Inch Nails album Pretty Hate Machine. Julianne Escobedo Spephard of Spin called the song "bananas" and complimented producer Arca's work on the song, writing: "[It] recalls both the sub-bass on [her] EP Stretch 2, and the demonic elasticity of [her] beat for Mykki Blanco's "Join My Militia". Gavin Haynes of NME wrote that the song "finds a natural pathway between new Robo-Kanye and the stark experiments," such as his 2012 GOOD Music collaboration "Clique". In a more mixed review, Ryan Dombal of Pitchfork described the track as being "riotous" and wrote in response to King Louie's appearance: "His presence, along with that of fellow Chi-town driller Chief Keef, makes the message clear: America may want to ignore these young black men from the gang-strewn South Side, but here, they have a voice."

== Credits and personnel ==
Credits adapted from the Yeezus liner notes.

- Songwriters – Kanye West, Louis Johnson, Guy-Manuel de Homem-Christo, Thomas Bangalter, Alejandra Ghersi, Mike Levy, Sakiya Sandifer, Ab Liva, Elon Rutberg, Mike Dean, Moses Davis, Colin York, Lowell Dunbar
- Producer – Kanye West and Daft Punk
- Co-producer – Gesaffelstein and Brodinski
- Additional producer – Arca and Mike Dean #MWA
- Engineer – Noah Goldstein and Andrew Dawson
- Assistant engineer – Marc Portheau, Khoï Huynh, Raoul Le Pennec, Nabil Essemlani, and Keith Parry
- Mix – Anthony Kilhoffer at Shangri-La Studios, Malibu, California
- Mix assisted – Sean Oakley, Eric Lynn, Dave 'Squirrel' Covell, and Josh Smith
- Vocals – King Louie

== Charts ==
Chart (2013)	Peak position
US Hot R&B/Hip-Hop Songs (Billboard)	50
US On-Demand Streaming Songs (Billboard)	42
