= Fonzworth Bentley =

American rapper (born 1974)

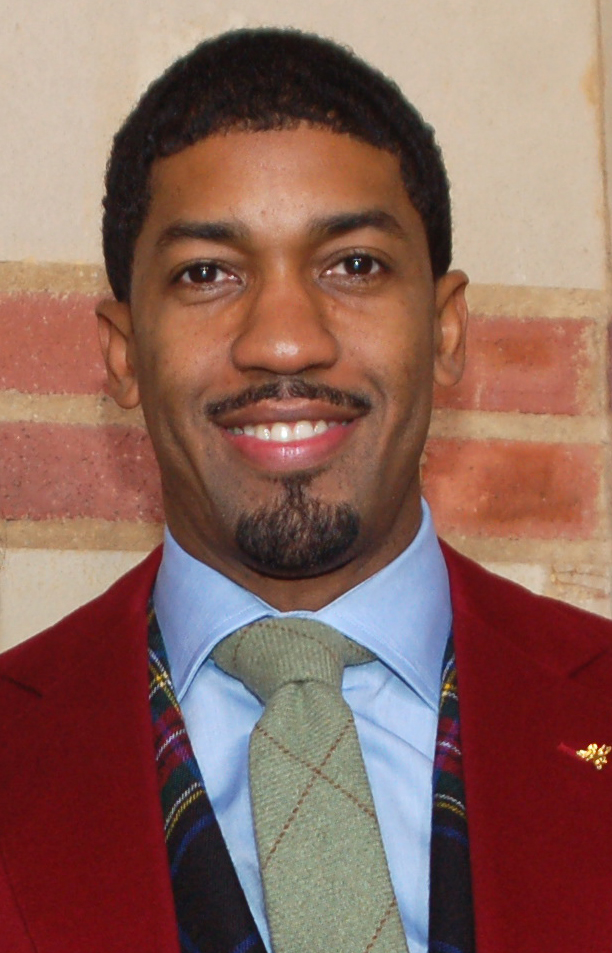
- Bentley in December 2010

Background information
- Also known as: Farnsworth Bentley
- Born: Derek Watkins; February 13, 1974 (age 52); Atlanta, Georgia, U.S.
- Genre: Hip hop
- Occupations: Rapper; record producer; songwriter; actor; television presenter; fashion designer
- Years active: 2002–present
- Labels: F.J. Bentley; E1

Derrick Watkins (born February 13, 1974), known professionally as Fonzworth Bentley, is an American rapper, actor, television presenter, and author. He is perhaps best known for being Sean Combs's former personal valet and assistant, as first seen in Making the Band 2, and was the host of MTV's From G's to Gents. He was born in Atlanta, Georgia.

== Career ==
He first appeared rapping on Da Band's 2002 album Too Hot for TV, in the track "Cheers to Me, Mr. Bentley (Interlude)". In 2003, Bentley was featured on the "Good Day, Good Sir" skit on OutKast's Speakerboxxx/The Love Below. In 2004, he made a cameo in the music video of Kanye West's "The New Workout Plan". Bentley is credited as a songwriter on multiple Yeezus tracks including "On Sight", "Black Skinhead", "I Am a God", and "Hold My Liquor". He is also credited as a producer on West's "Ultralight Beam".

His debut album, C.O.L.O.U.R.S., was released via iTunes on April 26, 2011.

He was also featured playing the violin in the "Yes We Can" music video in support of Barack Obama's 2008 presidential campaign.

== Other media work ==
Bentley was an executive producer for Borrow My Crew in 2005, in which he allowed a boy, Cory Cole, to borrow the entourage of P. Diddy for two days. In 2008, he hosted the MTV reality series From G's to Gents, which ran for two seasons.

In 2007, Bentley authored an etiquette book, Advance Your Swagger: How to Use Manners, Confidence and Style to Get Ahead.

In May 2009, Bentley hosted one of the afterparties following the White House Correspondents' Dinner in Washington, D.C.

== Public service ==
In 2007, Bentley contributed to KnowHow2GO. Bentley's involvement in the campaign has included creation of a radio public service advertisement ("Wanna Go?") and participation in the 2007 YMCA Black and Hispanic Achievers Teen Leadership Summit in Orlando, Florida. Bentley sang as a member of the chorus for "We Are The World", a remake of the original for Haiti, in February 2010.

== Works ==
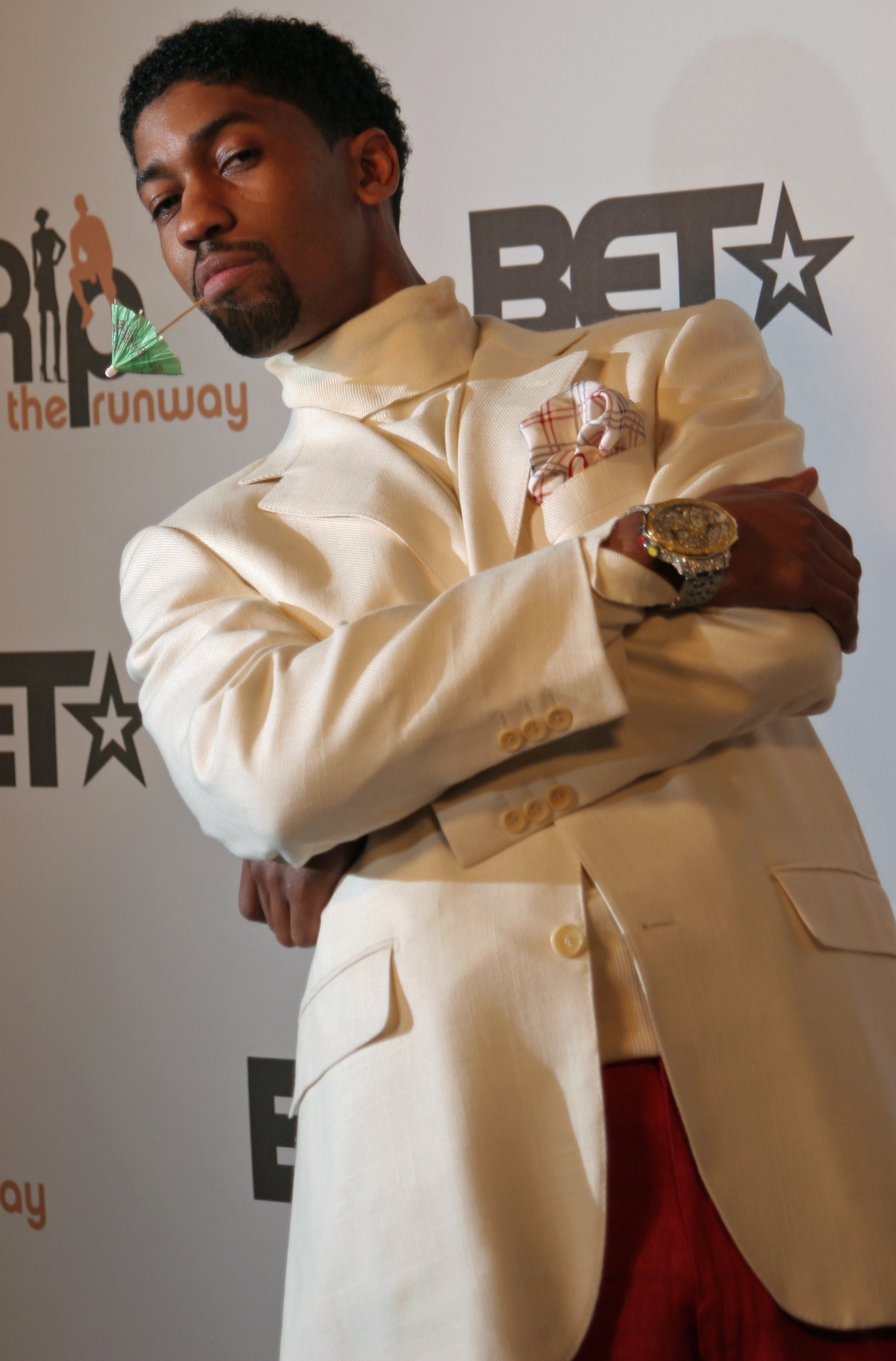
Bentley in March 2005

=== Studio albums ===
- C.O.L.O.U.R.S. (2011)

=== Television ===
- From G's to Gents (2008–09)
- Top Ten Gentlemen's Club (2008)
- Confessions of a Celebrity Assistant (2006, the E! Channel)
- VH1 Fashion Rocks (2006)
- All Shades of Fine: 25 Hottest Women of the Past 25 Years (2005)
- P. Diddy Presents the Bad Boys of Comedy (2005)
- Caleta Condor, Chile (2005)
- Before, During and After the Sunset (2005)
- Borrow My Crew (2005)
- Fade to Black (2004)
- Making the Band 2 (2002–2003, series)

=== Films ===
- Honey (2003) – Barber
- Fat Albert (2004) – Salesman
- Idlewild (2006) – Voice of Flask
- We Were Once a Fairytale – cameo appearance
- Think Like a Man Too (2014) - Limo Driver
