= American Parkinson Disease Association =

U.S. non-profit organization

The American Parkinson Disease Association (APDA) is a grassroots advocacy organization for people with Parkinson's disease and their families.

Founded in 1961, the APDA aims to "ease the burden" for Americans with Parkinson's disease, as well as for their families, through nationwide Information and Referral Centers and support groups. The APDA also pursues efforts to find a cure for Parkinson's, as they fund centers for advanced research and award grants to researchers as means to fund them.

Since its founding, the APDA has reportedly raised and invested more than $87 million to fund research, to provide patient services and education, and to elevate public awareness.
