= Malik Yusef =

American spoken word poet, rapper and producer from Chicago

- Born: Malik Yusef El Shabazz Jones; April 4, 1971 (age 55)
- Origin: Chicago, Illinois, U.S.
- Genres: Hip hop; R&B; spoken word
- Occupations: Spoken word artist; poet; writer; record producer; director; rapper
- Years active: 1995-present
- Labels: Universal; GOOD

Malik Yusef el-Shabazz Jones (born April 4, 1971) is an American spoken word artist, poet, rapper, record producer, and director based in Chicago, Illinois.

== Early life ==
Jones' surname means "King Joseph" (Malik and Yusuf, respectively) in Arabic. He was raised in Chicago's South Side neighborhood, known as the "Wild 100's", where he became affiliated with the Blackstone Rangers street gang; he is no longer involved in gang activity. In his youth, he became friendly with the rapper Common. He is dyslexic, which he first realized as a teenager. He first became known regionally as a street poet, and later into an actor, mainly acting out of his "street hustler" persona.

Yusef draws inspiration from various sources, including his children, dreams, ancestral heritage, and influential poets such as Langston Hughes, William Shakespeare, Haki Madhubuti, and Phillis Wheatley. His spoken word artistry has not only shaped his career but has also been featured in high-profile promotional campaigns for brands such as ASCAP, Sprite, Coca-Cola, General Motors, Chrysler, Verizon, Miller Brewing Co., and Nike.

== Acting career ==
He got his first break when New Line Cinema Director Ted Witcher commissioned him to coach Larenz Tate in the romantic drama Love Jones which went on to garner a Sundance Film Festival Award and three NAACP Image Awards. While filming in Chicago, Yusef additionally made a cameo as a guest spoken word artist.

In 2007 he collaborated with Director Frey Hoffman (Kanye West's "Jesus Walks", Sa-Ra' featuring Erykah Badu and Talib Kweli "Feel the Bass") for the film adaptation of Yusef's poem "Hollywood Jerome". The two contemporaries previously joined forces for Yusef's 2005 music video "Wouldn't You Like to Ride" featuring Kanye West and Common. Their film "The Untimely Demise of Hollywood Jerome" presents a gritty street drama, chronicling the tale of a 14-year-old South Side gang member who idolizes classic Hollywood gangsters like the archetypical Scarface and Godfather. Yusef and Hoffman's film openly confronts pop culture's misrepresentation and glorification of gang warfare. The film culminates in the protagonist caught up in a police stand-off on the opposite side of town. Cameos include Kanye West and Twista.

== Television career ==
His most noticeable performance came in 2002 during a featured poem entitled "I Spit…" on Season 2 of HBO's Russell Simmon's Def Poetry Jam. The segment also featured artists including Malcolm-Jamal Warner and hip hop icon Rakim. Yusef appeared as himself in the 2005 VH-1 Television Series Driven, a documentary surrounding the life of friend Kanye West, also featuring appearances from Common, Damon Dash, Jermaine Dupri, Jay-Z, Ludacris, and Russell Simmons. He additionally made guest appearances on ABC Worldwide News, WGN Morning News, CLTV's Garrard McClendon Live!, BET's Rap City, and MTV's Hip-Hop Week.

== Music career ==
=== The Great Chicago Fire; A Cold Day in Hell (Universal Records 2003) ===
He released his solo album featuring local talent including Kanye West, Carl Thomas, Marvo 11, Chantay Savage, Michael Coleman, Common and Twista, documenting an amalgam of eroticism, religion, gangster folklore and hip-hop. The Source magazine dubbed the debut "a classic".

=== G.O.O.D. Morning, G.O.O.D. Night (G.O.O.D Music Recordings 2009) ===
He released his sophomore effort, G.O.O.D. Morning, G.O.O.D. Night in June 2009, featuring guest musicians and producers Kanye West, Common, Raheem Devaughn, Christopher Denson, Marc “Benda World” Boyd, Jennifer Hudson, Michelle Williams, Hearontrackz, KRS One, Adam Levine of Maroon 5, Twista, Jes.Tone, rock band Violet Nine, and soul pianist John Legend, as well as musician Mr Hudson. The concept of the reflective double CD displayed Protagonist vs. Antagonist/Lower Self vs. Higher Self, exhibiting the poet's struggle between his internal dualities.

The first single "Magic Man" featured Kanye West, Common, and John Legend. Another song called "By Your Side" which featured Destiny's Child member Michelle Williams and singer Brando was leaked on the Internet.

=== 2012-present: Cruel Summer ===
Yusef made an appearance on the G.O.O.D. Music collaborative album, Cruel Summer, which was released on September 18, 2012. He appeared on the track, "Sin City," along with fellow G.O.O.D. Music artists John Legend, Teyana Taylor, Cyhi the Prynce, and Travis Scott.

== Discography ==
=== Albums ===
- The Great Chicago Fire; A Cold Day in Hell (Universal Records 2003)
- G.O.O.D. Morning, G.O.O.D. Night (GOOD Music 2009)
- Good M.U.S.I.C. Universe Sonic Sinema Episode 4: The Expensive Is Gheteaux (MY Music Group 2024)

=== Singles ===
- "Wouldn't You Like To Ride" featuring Kanye West and Common (2005)
- "Magic Man" featuring Kanye West, Common and John Legend (2009)
- ”Light Show” featuring Gee Get Money, Cylentsounds, Benda World & Super Chilly (2024)

=== Collaborations ===
He and jazz saxophonist Mike Phillips (Hidden Beach Records) collaborated on the song "This is Not a Game", which was selected by basketball star Michael Jordan and appeared on the interactive CD-Rom included alongside his limited edition Jordan 17 Sneakers in August 2002. His work has also been featured on a string of albums, particularly alongside his comrades and Chicago natives.

- "My City" – Common - One Day It'll All Make Sense (Relativity Records 1997)
- "Trouble Don't Last Always" – Carl Thomas – Emotional (Bad Boy Records 2000)
- "Know it's Alright" – Carl Thomas – Let's Talk About It (Bad Boy Records 2004)
- "Wouldn't You Like To Ride" featuring Common & Kanye West - Coach Carter soundtrack (Capitol Records 2005)
- "Crack Music" - Kanye West featuring The Game - Late Registration (Roc-a-Fella Records 2005)
- "Mr. Blue Collar" - Rhymefest - Blue Collar (Allido Records 2006)
- "Welcome to Chi" - Dr. Cornel West - Never Forget: A Journey of Revelations (Hidden Beach Records 2007)
- "Stay Up" - Kanye West featuring 88-Keys - The Death of Adam (Extra Credit) (2007)
- "Promised Land" – Kanye West, Adam Levine, John Legend - Barack Obama: Yes We Can soundtrack (Hidden Beach Records 2008)
- "Always Be Arriving" – Kindred the Family Soul - Arrival (Hidden Beach Records 2008)
- "Woman I Desire" – Raheem DeVaughn - Love Behind the Melody (Jive Records 2008)
- "Magic Man" – Kanye West & Malik Yusef, featuring John Legend & Common (G.O.O.D. Music 2009)
- "Fragile" – Raheem DeVaughn - The Love & War MasterPeace (Jive Records 2010)
- "Ayyy Girl" – JYJ featuring Kanye West and Malik Yusef - The Beginning (C-JeS/Warner 2010)
- "Sin City (Cruel Summer)" - Kanye West featuring John Legend, Travis Scott, Teyana Taylor, Cyhi the Prynce & Malik Yusef (GOOD Music album 2012)
- "Nobody's Smiling" – Common – Nobody's Smiling (Def-Jam Recordings/ARTium Records 2014)
- "Actress" - Ty Dolla $ign (atlantic records 2015)
- "Free Love" - Vic Mensa featuring Malik Yusef 2016

=== Producing or writing, composing ===
- Drake - "Glow" OVO Sound, Young Money, Cash Money, Republic Records 2017
- Vic Mensa - "The Manuscript" Virgin EMI Records 2017
- Vic Mensa, Mr Hudson - "almost there" Virgin EMI Records 2017
- Vic Mensa - "heaven on earth" Roc Nation, Capitol 2017
- Vic Mensa - "Didn't i" Roc Nation, Capitol 2017
- Vic Mensa - "OMG" Roc Nation, Capitol 2017
- Vic Mensa - "The Fire Next Time Lyrics" 2017
- Vic Mensa - "Wings" Roc Nation, Capitol 2017
- Vic Mensa - "We Could Be Free" Roc Nation, Capitol 2017
- Vic Mensa - "Down for Some Ignorance" Wings" Roc Nation, Capitol 2017
- Vic Mensa - "Memories on 47th St." Roc Nation, Capitol 2017
- Beyonce - "Lemonade" Parkwood, Columbia 2016
- Beyonce - "Sandcastles" Parkwood, Columbia 2016
- Vic Mensa - "There's Alot Going On" Roc Nation, Def Jam Recordings 2016
- Vic Mensa - "16 Shots" Roc Nation, Def Jam Recordings 2016
- Vic Mensa - "Free love" 2016
- Kanye West - "The Life of Pablo" Good Music, Def Jam Recordings 2016
- Kanye West - "Famous" Good Music, Def Jam Recordings 2016
- Kanye West - "Ultralight Beam" Good Music, Def Jam Recordings 2016
- Kanye West - "Father Stretch My Hands PT.1" Good Music, Def Jam Recordings 2016
- Kanye West - "All Day" Good Music, Def Jam Recordings 2016
- Kanye West - "Feedback" Good Music, Def Jam Recordings 2016
- Kanye West - "Highlights" Good Music, Def Jam Recordings 2016
- Kanye West - "Free Style 4" Good Music, Def Jam Recordings 2016
- Kanye West - "I Love Kanye" Good Music, Def Jam Recordings 2016
- Kanye West - "Waves" Good Music, Def Jam Recordings 2016
- Kanye West - "FML" Good Music, Def Jam Recordings 2016
- Kanye West - "Real Friends" Good Music, Def Jam Recordings 2016
- Kanye West - "Wolves" Good Music, Def Jam Recordings 2016
- Kanye West - "30 Hours" Good Music, Def Jam Recordings 2016
- Kanye West - "No More Parties in LA" Good Music, Def Jam Recordings 2016
- Kanye West - "Fade" Good Music, Def Jam Recordings 2016
- Channel Live - "Ghetto B.I" Flavor Unit 2016
- Ty Dolla $ign - "Actress" Atlantic Records 2015
- Common - "Nobody's Smiling" Def Jam Recordings 2014
- Snoh Aalegra - "Bad things" 2014
- Kanye West - "Yeezus" Def Jam Recordings, a division of UMG Recordings, Inc 2013
- Kanye West - "Bound 2" Def Jam Recordings, a division of UMG Recordings, Inc 2013
- Kanye West - "On Sight" Def Jam Recordings, a division of UMG Recordings, Inc 2013
- Kanye West - "Black Skinhead" Def Jam Recordings, a division of UMG Recordings, Inc 2013
- Kanye West - "I Am A God" Def Jam Recordings, a division of UMG Recordings, Inc 2013
- Kanye West - "Hold My Liquor" Def Jam Recordings, a division of UMG Recordings, Inc 2013
- Kanye West - "I'm In It" Def Jam Recordings, a division of UMG Recordings, Inc 2013
- Kanye West - "Blood On The Leaves" Def Jam Recordings, a division of UMG Recordings, Inc 2013
- Kanye West - "Mercy" Def Jam Recordings, a division of UMG Recordings, Inc 2012
- Kanye West - "New Slaves" Def Jam Recordings, a division of UMG Recordings, Inc 2012
- Kanye West - "Cruel Summer" Def Jam Recordings, a division of UMG Recordings, Inc 2012
- Kanye West - "Sin City" Def Jam Recordings, a division of UMG Recordings, Inc 2012
- Kanye West - "The One" Def Jam Recordings, a division of UMG Recordings, Inc 2012
- Snoop Dogg - "Gangbang Rookie" Doggystyle, Priority 2011
- Snoop Dogg - "i don't need no bitch" Doggystyle, Priority 2011
- Kanye West - "All of the Lights" Def Jam Recordings 2010
- Kanye West - "My Dark Twisted Fantasy" Def Jam Recordings 2010
- Kanye West - "Dark Fantasy" Def Jam Recordings 2010
- Kanye West - "Gorgeous" Def Jam Recordings 2010
- Kanye West - "Devil in a New Dress" Def Jam Recordings 2010
- Kanye West - "Runaway" Def Jam Recordings 2010
- Kanye West - "Power" Def Jam Recordings 2010
- Kanye West - "Monster" Def Jam Recordings 2010
- Kanye West - "Robocop" Def Jam Recordings 2010
- John Legend and the Roots- "The Little Ghetto Boy" Good Music 2010
- Raheem DeVaughn - "The Love & War MasterPeace" Jive, Zomba 2010
- Raheem DeVaughn - "Fragile" Jive, Zomba 2009
- DO or Die (D.O.D) - "Around Here" 2010
- Kanye West - "Magic Man" Good Music 2009
- Raheem DeVaughn - "Woman I Desire" Jive 2009
- Kanye West - "Amazing" Roc-A-Fella Records (Def Jam Recordings) 2008
- Kanye West - "Love Lockdown" Roc-A-Fella Records (Def Jam Recordings) 2008
- Kanye West - "Heartless" Roc-A-Fella Records (Def Jam Recordings) 2008
- Kanye West - "Promised Land" Roc-A-Fella Records (Def Jam Recordings) 2008
- Kindred the Family Soul - "Always be Arriving (Finale)" Hidden Beach Recordings, Shanachie Records 2008
- Kindred the Family Soul - "Poetry Interlude" Hidden Beach Recordings, Shanachie Records 2008
- Kanye West - "Stay Up" Roc-A-Fella Records (Def Jam Recordings) 2007
- Rhymefest - "Mr. blue collar" Def Jam Recordings 2006
- Kanye West - "Late Registration " Def Jam Recordings 2005
- Kanye West - "Crack Music" Def Jam Recordings 2005
- Carl Thomas - "Know It's Alright" Big Beat Records 2004
- Common - "My city" Relativity Records 1997

=== Grammys ===
Yusef has won 1 Grammy award from ten nominations.

=== Tours ===
- Winter 2018: Jay-Z 4:44 Tour / Jay-Z and Vic mensa and Malik yusef
- Summer 2008 : "The Art of Love Tour" f/ Raheem Devaughn and Chrisette Michele
- Spring 2008 : "Real Thing Tour" f/ Jill Scott & Raheem Devaughn
- Fall 2005 : "Touch the Sky Tour" f/ Kanye West & Keyshia Cole
- Summer 2000 : Carl Thomas & Mary J. Blige Tour
