= Cyhi the Prynce =

American rapper, singer, and songwriter

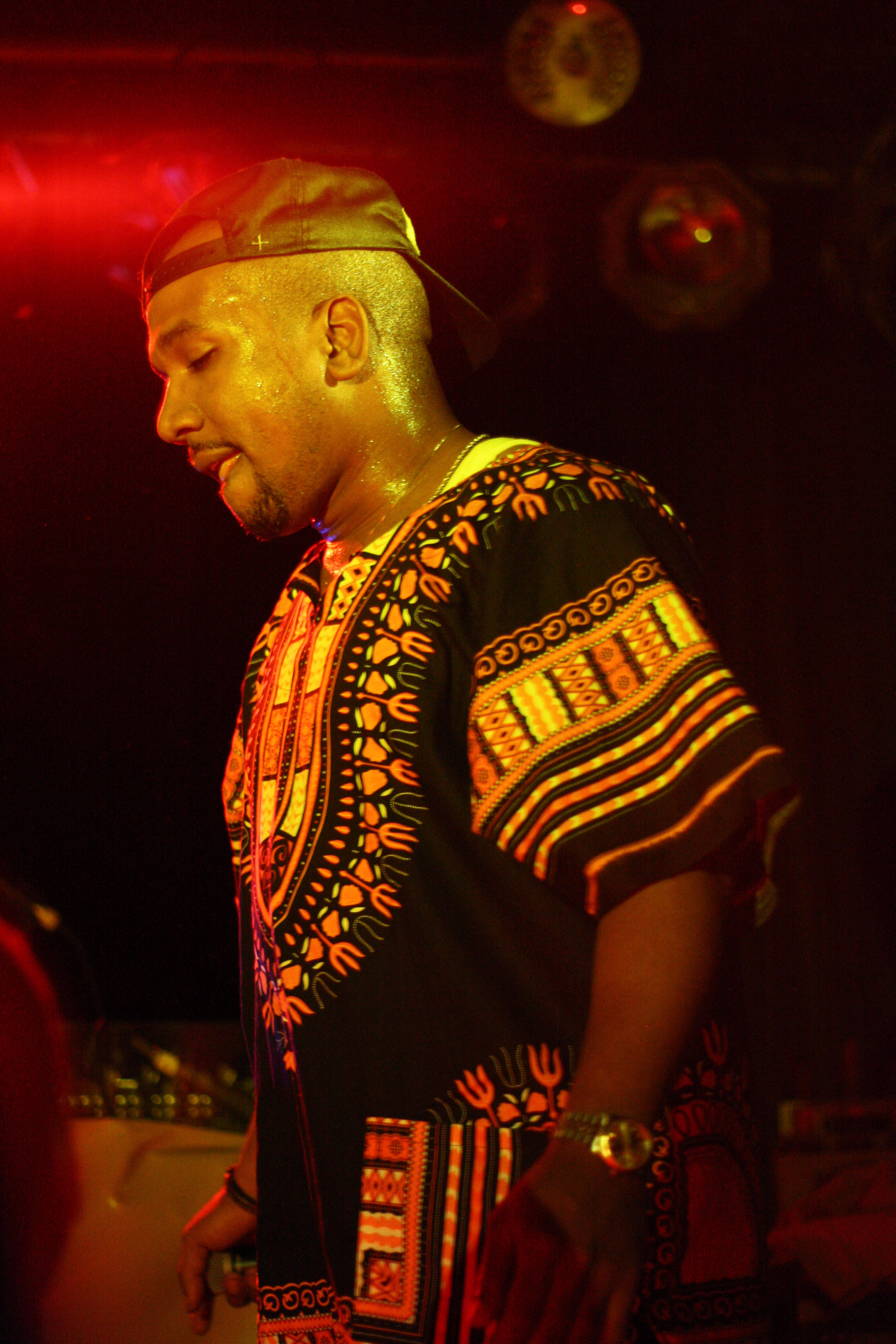
- Cyhi the Prynce performing in 2014

Background information
- Also known as: Prynce Cyhi; Cyhi da Prynce
- Born: Cydel Charles Young; September 15, 1984 (age 41)
- Origin: Stone Mountain, Georgia, U.S.
- Genres: Conscious hip-hop
- Occupations: Rapper; singer; songwriter
- Years active: 2005–present
- Labels: Ivy State; Sony; Def Jam; Konvict Muzik

Cydel Charles Young (born September 15, 1984), known professionally as CyHi the Prynce (/ˈsaɪhaɪ/ SY-hy; also referred to as CyHi da Prynce or simply CyHi), is an American rapper, singer, and songwriter from Stone Mountain, Georgia. He signed a major label recording contract with Akon's Konvict Muzik, in a joint venture with Def Jam Recordings in 2009. The following year, he gained mainstream attention for his guest appearance alongside Jay-Z, Pusha T, Swizz Beatz, and RZA on Kanye West's 2010 song "So Appalled", from the latter's album My Beautiful Dark Twisted Fantasy (2010). He was then credited with extensive songwriting work on West's further releases, resulting in five Grammy Award nominations for Best Rap Song, as well as one additional nomination for his work on Travis Scott's 2018 single "Sicko Mode."

Young has released nine mixtapes, of which contain conscious or political themes discussing the history and social affairs of Black people in America. He parted ways with Def Jam in 2015 and signed with Sony Music to release his long-delayed debut studio album, No Dope on Sundays (2017); executive produced by West, it was met with critical praise and modestly entered the Billboard 200.

== Biography ==
=== 1985–2011: Early life and career beginnings ===
Growing up in Georgia, Young played various sports including football, basketball, and track and field; in addition to having sung in school choirs and participated in school plays and dances. He was raised Baptist by strict parents, who did not allow him to listen to hip hop music as a youth. However, Young cites his parents' methods as a foundation upon which he could build himself in character, especially growing up in the area that he was.

In 2009, Young signed a recording contract with Akon's Konvict Muzik label imprint, under the aegis of Def Jam Recordings. Young first gained major attention in 2010 when he received a co-sign from fellow American rapper and hip hop mogul Kanye West. Young reports that American singer Beyoncé, a friend of West and the wife of his mentor, Jay-Z, convinced Kanye West to sign him to his GOOD Music imprint. This culminated in Young's inclusion on West's weekly free music giveaway GOOD Fridays, and his fifth studio album My Beautiful Dark Twisted Fantasy (2010).

Young recorded his second mixtape, Royal Flush II, with producer CPK, and planned to work further with previous collaborators the J.U.S.T.I.C.E. League, No I.D. and Kanye West, as well as DJ Toomp, The Alchemist and Just Blaze. Young released his third mixtape, Jack of All Trades, later in 2011, which announced the title of his debut studio album to be Hardway Musical.

=== 2012: Cruel Summer ===
Young appeared on GOOD Music's compilation album Cruel Summer, released September 18, 2012. Young was ultimately featured on two tracks, including: "The Morning", along with Raekwon, Common, Pusha T, 2 Chainz, Kid Cudi, and D'banj, as well as "Sin City", alongside John Legend, Teyana Taylor, Malik Yusef, and Travis Scott. On January 29, 2013, he released his fifth mixtape, Ivy League: Kick Back. The tape features guest appearances from 2 Chainz, B.o.B, Travis Porter, Yelawolf, Childish Gambino, Trae Tha Truth and Bobby Valentino among others. Despite not being featured on Kanye West's Yeezus album, Young has writing credits on all but one of the album's songs. CyHi continued to prepare his debut studio album Hardway Musical for release.

=== 2015–present: Label confusion and L.I.O.N. ===
As of August 2015, Young's album had yet to receive a release date. Frustrated with his situation and having been dropped from Def Jam Recordings, he released a diss track called "Elephant in the Room", aimed toward G.O.O.D. Music, its owner Kanye West, Pusha T, and Teyana Taylor. On the track, he addresses his album delays and even threatens Kanye: "While you're in your little Lambo on Sunset, I'm riding with a gun next to me and it sounds like a little boy playing with a drum set / And, it holds a hundred rounds 'cause when you come around, niggas quick to gun you down." Young would later clarify that the track was not in fact a diss. Rather it was similar to the light-hearted 'insults' that Eminem would inflict on Dr. Dre. An upcoming album to be titled L.I.O.N. was announced amid this increase in media attention, still containing the G.O.O.D. Music imprint's logo, further indicating that Young was still with the label, and on good terms.

His debut album, No Dope on Sundays, was released on November 17, 2017. It was preceded by the singles "Movin' Around" featuring Schoolboy Q and "Dat Side" featuring Kanye West.

He wrote on the tracks "Keys to My Life" and "Vultures" from ¥$ (Kanye West and Ty Dolla Sign) album Vultures 1, released on February 10, 2024.

On February 14, 2021, Young revealed on Instagram that he had survived an assassination attempt. As he was driving on an Atlanta highway, his car was reportedly shot up, causing it to flip over. After his car hit a pole and crashed into a tree, the suspect continued to shoot the car before fleeing the scene.

== Discography ==
=== Studio albums ===
- No Dope on Sundays (2017)

=== Mixtapes ===
- Royal Flush (2010)
- Royal Flush 2 (2011)
- Jack of All Trades (2011)
- Ivy League Club (2012)
- Ivy League: Kick Back (2013)
- Black Hystori Project (2014)
- Black Hystori Project 2: N.A.A.C.P. (2015)

== Awards and nominations ==
=== Grammy Awards (as songwriter) ===
Year	Work	Award	Result	Ref.
2014	"New Slaves"	Best Rap Song	Nominated	
2015	"Bound 2"	Best Rap Song	Nominated	
2016	"All Day"	Best Rap Song	Nominated	
2017	"Famous"	Best Rap Song	Nominated	
2017	"Ultralight Beam"	Best Rap Song	Nominated	
2019	"Sicko Mode"	Best Rap Song	Nominated	
