= Yeezus =

- Digital cover artwork; CD copies are packaged as depicted.

Studio album by Kanye West
- Released: June 18, 2013
- Recorded: 2012 – June 2013
- Studios: Germano (New York City) (Note: Tracks 1–5, 7 and 8); Gee Jam (Port Antonio) (Note: Track 6); Madpan (New York City) (Note: Choir on track 1); The Mercer Hotel (New York City) (Note: Track 8); No Name Hotel (Paris); Real World (Bath) (Note: Tracks 6 and 8); Shangri-La (Malibu) (Note: Tracks 1, 2 and 4–8); Studios de la Seine (Paris) (Note: Tracks 1, 2, 9 and 10)
- Genres: Hip-hop; industrial rap; punk rap; alternative rap; experimental; electronic
- Length: 40:01
- Labels: Roc-A-Fella; Def Jam
- Producers: Daft Punk; Hudson Mohawke; Kanye West; Lunice; Mike Dean; S1

Kanye West chronology
Cruel Summer (2012)	Yeezus (2013)	The Life of Pablo (2016)

Singles from Yeezus
- 1. "Black Skinhead" Released: June 19, 2013; 2. "Bound 2" Released: August 28, 2013

Yeezus is the sixth studio album by the American rapper Kanye West. It was released on June 18, 2013, through Def Jam Recordings and Roc-A-Fella Records. West began recording it in 2012 and produced it alongside Mike Dean, Daft Punk, Noah Goldstein, Arca, Hudson Mohawke, and Travis Scott. West recruited Rick Rubin as an executive producer 15 days before its release to help strip down the sound for a minimalist approach. Guest appearances include Justin Vernon, Chief Keef, Kid Cudi, Assassin, King L, Charlie Wilson, and Frank Ocean.

In contrast to West's previous albums, Yeezus is characterized by an abrasive, electronic soundscape with distorted drum machines and synthesizers. It draws from genres including industrial, acid house, electro, punk, Chicago drill, and horrorcore, while continuing West's use of unconventional samples. Music critics considered Yeezus the most experimental work by West, who described it as "a protest to music" and excluded tracks deemed too melodic or similar to his prior work. Lyrical themes include drug use, racial politics, sex, and relationships.

Yeezus was initially promoted with an unorthodox, minimalist marketing campaign that included worldwide video projections and live television performances. No singles preceded the release; "Black Skinhead" was released as the lead single in July 2013, followed by "Bound 2" in August. West embarked on the Yeezus Tour to support it between October 2013 and September 2014. Yeezus received acclaim from critics, who considered it among West's best work and commended its brash direction, though its departure from West's prior soundscape divided general audiences. It was the most acclaimed album of 2013, according to Metacritic, and topped numerous end-of-year list rankings.

Yeezus was nominated for Best Rap Album at the 2014 Grammy Awards. It debuted at number one on the US Billboard 200, selling 327,000 copies in the first week of release, while also topping the charts in Australia, Canada, Denmark, New Zealand, Russia, and the United Kingdom. It has been certified double platinum by the Recording Industry Association of America (RIAA). Several publications named it one of the best albums of the 2010s, including Rolling Stone, which also included it on its 2020 list of the 500 Greatest Albums of All Time.

== Background ==
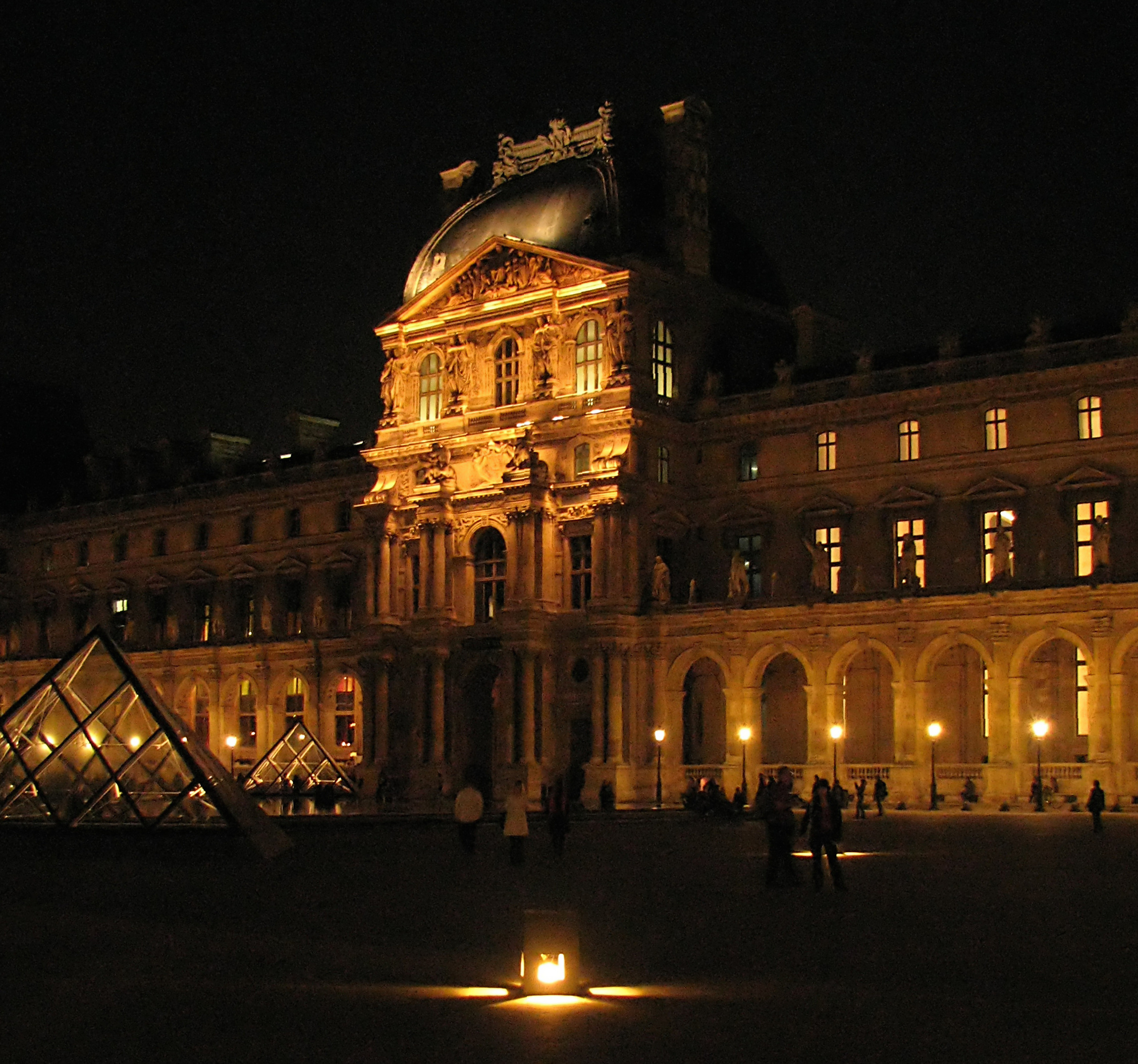
West first began work on Yeezus at his personal loft in Paris, and on numerous occasions visited the Louvre (pictured) for inspiration.

Following the release of his fifth studio album, My Beautiful Dark Twisted Fantasy (2010), Kanye West collaborated with longtime friend Jay-Z on Watch the Throne (2011). In July 2012, producer No I.D. revealed that he had been working on West's sixth solo studio album (and seventh overall) and that it would be released after Cruel Summer (2012), a collaborative compilation album between members of West's record label GOOD Music.

West was influenced primarily by minimalist design and architecture during the production of Yeezus, and visited a furniture exhibit in the Louvre five times. A single Le Corbusier lamp was his "greatest inspiration". West worked closely with the architect Oana Stănescu, and took "field trips" to Le Corbusier homes. Fascinated by Stănescu's comments on the unusual and radical nature of Corbusier design choices, West applied the situation to his own life, feeling that "visionaries can be misunderstood by their unenlightened peers". West also met with architect Joseph Dirand and Belgian interior designer Axel Vervoordt, and had "rare Le Corbusier lamps, Pierre Jeanneret chairs and obscure body-art journals from Switzerland" delivered to the loft. West also wanted a deep hometown influence on the album, and listened to 1980s house music most associated with his home city of Chicago for influence. Alejandro Jodorowsky's The Holy Mountain was also an inspiration for the album and its ensuing tour. The album was originally titled Thank God for Drugs.

== Recording and production ==
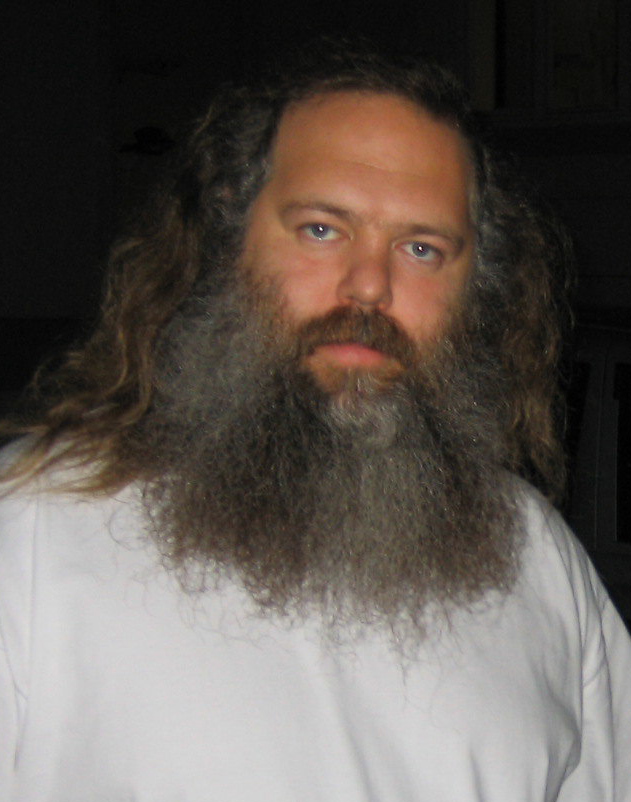
West enlisted Def Jam Recordings co-founder Rick Rubin to executive produce the album.

In 2012, West began recording his sixth studio album with collaborators, including No I.D. and DJ Khaled. The first recordings were held in January 2013, in the living room of his personal loft at a Paris hotel, referred to in the album's credits as the "No Name Hotel". West kept compositions simple in order to hear the tracks more clearly; too much bass or complexity would simply overpower the room's poor acoustics. The beats emanating from the loft space, which sometimes lasted through the night, provoked complaints from neighbors. Reports emerged that he and his then-girlfriend Kim Kardashian had moved to the loft in order for West to begin work on the album.

The atmosphere in the studio was described by contributor Evian Christ as "very focused", and West once again brought in several close collaborators. Producer Hudson Mohawke noted the inclusive "group" atmosphere of the sessions, in which multiple contributors would work on similar pieces, with different elements ultimately selected from each. All involved were given a song to work on and return the next day to sit and critique, a process Anthony Kilhoffer compared to an art class. Producer Arca described being initially asked to send West music, noting that she purposefully sent perhaps the strangest material she had, with West happening to be excited by it. Describing West's collaborative style, Arca stated:

It was a lot of coming up with design, like solving riddles. If the song called for something aggressive, it was up to three or four people to design what in their head was the best solution for that aggression in that moment. Everyone would approach it in completely different ways, and ultimately, it would all be edited by Kanye himself.

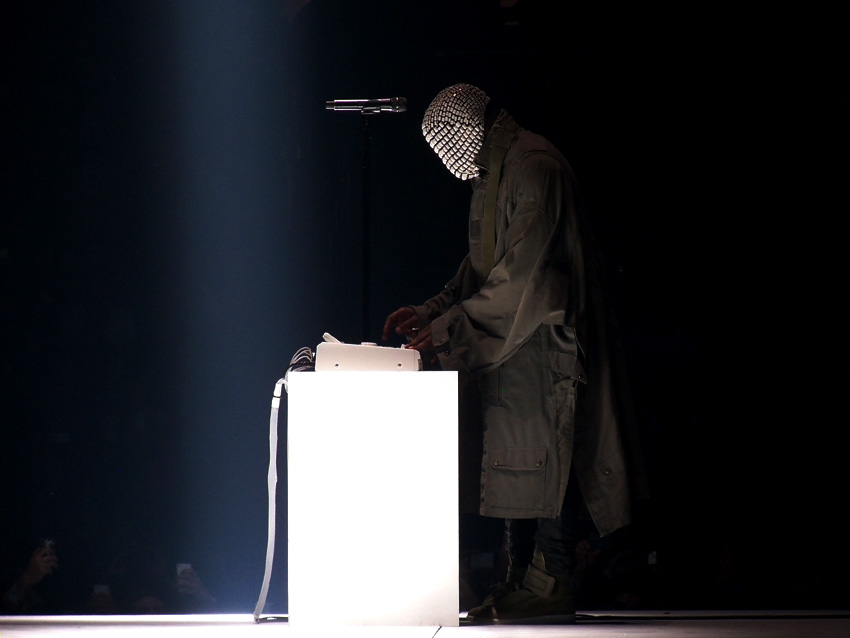
The record production is characterized as raw and dark. West maintains a stripped-down approach while continuing to use eclectic samples.

Determined to "undermine the commercial", several tracks were left off the finished product that were deemed too melodic or more in line with West's previous material. West set parameters regarding sound and style, insisting that there be no "bass wobbles" reminiscent of dubstep. The album's recording process was described as "very raw" by Thomas Bangalter of the French electronic duo Daft Punk, who produced four songs for the album, adding that West was "rapping – kind of screaming primally, actually". While previous albums, particularly Dark Fantasy, took considerable time in the studio, Yeezus was described by Kilhoffer as "the fastest record we ever made". In May 2013, Def Jam executives listened to the "final product", (only later to be changed) describing the album as "dark". American rapper Travis Scott opined that the snippets he'd heard of Yeezus were from the year 3000 and recalled "crazy memories" from being around West during the recording of it.

W writer Christopher Bagley reports that West's creative process often bordered on perfectionist. In March 2013, West described the album to Bagley as near completion, only to revise this statement one month later to the album being "only 30 percent complete". West made several last-minute alterations to Yeezus, enlisting the co-founder of Def Jam Recordings, Rick Rubin, as an executive producer for additional recording mere days before its release; changes included re-recording whole songs and rewriting entire verses. The rough cut West played Rubin ran nearly three and a half hours long. West's orders to Rubin were to take the music in a "stripped-down minimal direction", often removing elements already recorded. In a September 2013 interview with radio DJ Zane Lowe, West said of Rubin that "he's not a producer, he's a reducer".

For several days in late May and early June 2013, West and a "rotating group of intimates, collaborators and hangers-on" holed up at Rubin's Shangri-La studio in Malibu in service of completing the record. Rubin thought it impossible to meet the deadline and all involved ended up working long hours with no days off in order to complete the record. West had intended the album be 16 tracks until Rubin suggested cutting the album down to fewer tracks, from 16 songs to 10, saying the others could be reserved for a follow-up. Rubin gave as example "Bound", which was "a more middle of the road R&B song, done in an adult contemporary style" before West decided to replace the musical backing with a minimalistic sample, "a single note bassline in the hook which we processed to have a punk edge in the Suicide tradition". Two days before the album had to be delivered to the label, West wrote and sang the lyrics to two songs while also recording the vocals to three others in just two hours.

== Music and composition ==
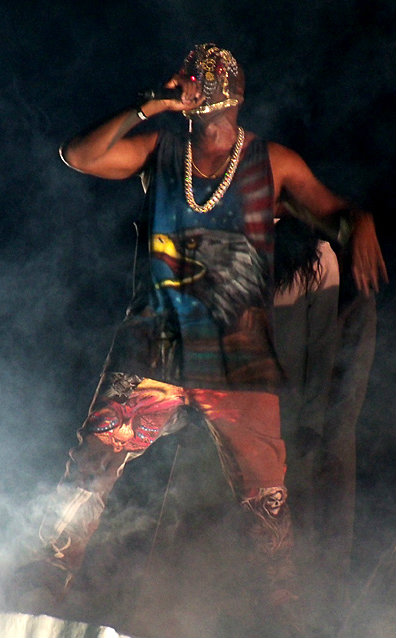
Described as West's most sonically experimental work, the album is driven by abrasive electronics while drawing from an array of industrial, punk and hip-hop subgenres.

According to Chicago Tribune critic Greg Kot, Yeezus is a "hostile, abrasive and intentionally off-putting" album that combines "the worlds of" 1980s Chicago acid-house, 2013 Chicago drill music, 1990s industrial music, and the "avant-rap" of Saul Williams, Death Grips, and Odd Future. The Independent, Mass Appeal, and The Village Voice described it as an experimental release, while Meagan Garvey of The Outline described it as West's "industrial album". Rolling Stone described it as "an extravagantly abrasive album full of grinding electro, pummeling minimalist hip-hop, drone-y wooz and industrial gear-grind", while Vulture called it a "punk rap opus", and Rolling Stone called it an "industrial-rap opus". Slant Magazine critic Ted Scheinman described the album as "built on alien, angular beats, slowly morphing drones and sirens, abrupt periods of silence, and a pulse-quickening style of delivery from Yeezy himself", writing that West reconceives the "notion of what kind of music (or noise) can underpin hip-hop". According to Charles Aaron of Spin, Yeezus is "a hip-hop album, not a rap album", because of how its sounds and subject matter are assembled together, and although listeners can hear "'punk' or 'post-punk' or industrial'" throughout, "hip-hop has always been about noise and dissonance and dance music as agitation". The album also incorporates elements of industrial and trap music. The record "most closely resembles" 1990s industrial rock, during which the genre had a significant pop culture impact, with artists such as Nine Inch Nails, Ministry, and Marilyn Manson gaining success. The industrial scene created a "vast global underground community", and Esquire notes that one of its epicenters was in Chicago, where West was raised. Evan Rytlewski of The A.V. Club characterized its opening series of songs as electro and industrial hip-hop. Billboard and Spin additionally observed horrorcore elements, such as synths and screaming.

Referencing the sound of Yeezus in September 2013, West stated: "For me as Kanye West, I got to fuck shit up... I'm going to take music and try to make it three dimensional... I'm not here to make easy listening, easily programmable music". At the same time, he viewed himself as artistically being "here to crack the pavement and break new ground, sonically". West would later go onto describe the sound of the album as "a protest to music". West elaborated, claiming that he "was like 'I'm gonna take my ball and go home'".

Yeezus is primarily electronic in nature, and boasts distorted drum machines and synthesizers that sound like they're malfunctioning, low-resolution samplers that add a pixelated digital aura to the most analog sounds. To this end, the album incorporates glitches reminiscent of CD skips or corrupted MP3's, and Auto-Tuned vocals are modulated to a point in which they are difficult to decipher. Esquire cites "On Sight" as an early example of the album's connection to electronic music, citing its "droning synthesizer tone", which is "modulated until the signal starts throwing off harshly treble-heavy spikes and begins to clip, as if it were overloading a digital audio processor".

"On Sight"
A sample of the opening track, "On Sight" exemplifies the album's abrasive electronic music. It features a droning synthesizer tone, one that is modulated until the signal gives off harsh treble-heavy spikes and begins to clip.

"Black Skinhead"
The album's lead single, "Black Skinhead" has alternately been called an industrial hip-hop song and "a galloping punk rap manifesto".

Yeezus continues West's practice of eclectic samples: he employs an obscure Hindi sample on "I Am a God", and a sample of 1970s Hungarian rock group Omega on "New Slaves". "On Sight" interpolates a melody from "Sermon (He'll Give Us What We Really Need)" by the Holy Name of Mary Choral Family, although the track originally sampled an old vocal track from the original recording. "Bound 2" features heavy soul music samples and has been described as the only song on Yeezus which recalls the sound of West's early work. "Bound", a 1971 song by American soul group Ponderosa Twins Plus One from their album 2 + 2 + 1 = Ponderosa Twins Plus One, serves as the primary sample used in West's track.

The album's second track "Black Skinhead" has alternately been called an industrial hip-hop song and "a galloping punk-rap manifesto". "I Am a God" was inspired by a "diss" from a major fashion designer, who informed West of his invitation to a widely anticipated runway show on the condition he agree to not attend other shows. "I'm in It" began with a different sample and melody, but West removed the sample and Rubin edited the track down from a six-minute arrangement. "Blood on the Leaves", which samples Nina Simone's 1965 rendition of "Strange Fruit" and was the first track in the first incarnation of the track list, is an example of West's signature dichotomy in which he melds the sacred and profane. "Strange Fruit", first recorded by Billie Holiday in 1939, brought the lynchings of black Americans to a "startling poignancy", creating "one of the most towering, important songs of the 20th century". West's anthemic re-telling instead details an MDMA-fueled hookup and the perils of fame.

== Promotion and release ==
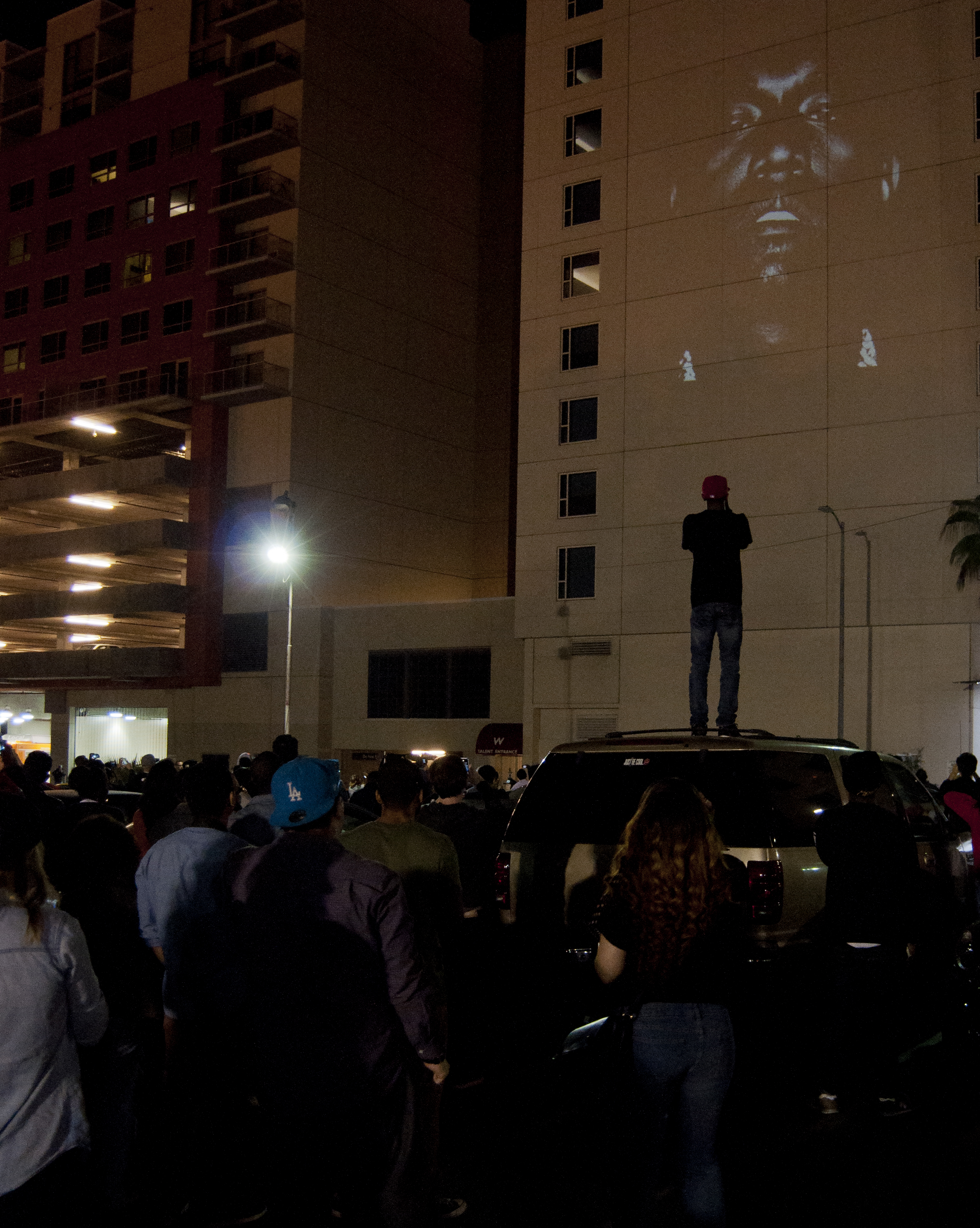
A video projection of "New Slaves" in Los Angeles in May 2013.

On May 1, 2013, West used Twitter to post a single message reading "June Eighteen", leading several media outlets to speculate that the post referred to the release date of West's upcoming album. On May 17, he began promotion of the album by unveiling the previously unreleased song "New Slaves" through video projections in 66 assorted locations. The following day, West appeared on the American late-night live television sketch comedy show Saturday Night Live and performed the songs "New Slaves" and "Black Skinhead". West subsequently revealed the album's cover and title, Yeezus, on his official website. Fellow rapper Kendrick Lamar offered his opinion on the title in an interview that same month, stating: "That's crazy, I want to hear that. That's that creative Kanye genius stuff out the box". He also claimed that the album's "whole marketing scheme is crazy" and "very inspiring". The iTunes Store made Yeezus available for pre-order on May 20, but the listing was subsequently taken down for unknown reasons. On May 29, A.P.C. founder Jean Touitou unveiled an advertisement for Yeezus which stated that the album would not be available for pre-order. Speaking about the album's minimal promotion, West stated: "With this album, we ain't drop no single to radio. We ain't got no NBA campaign, nothing like that. Shit, we ain't even got no cover. We just made some real music".

In May 2013, American rapper J. Cole called West "one of the greatest artists of our generation" via Twitter, with him following this by tweeting: "Which is exactly why I'm moving my release date up. Born Sinner June 18th". He explained releasing his second studio album Born Sinner on the same day as Yeezus during an interview that same month, saying: "I'm not going to sit [here]... I worked too hard to come a week later after Kanye West drops an amazing album. It'd be like, 'Oh and J.Cole dropped too, a week later.' Nah. I'm going to go see him on that date. He's the greatest". The next month, J. Cole gave further context, claiming for the coinciding release to be "more about the statement" than the sales. J. Cole elaborated on this, admitting that the music being competed over "is art" and he "can't compete against the Kanye West celebrity and the status that he's earned just from being a genius", though stated: "But I can put my name in the hat and tell you that I think my album is great and you be the judge and you decide". A lyrical reference to releasing on the same date as West is included in the track "Forbidden Fruit" from Born Sinner.

The physical CD edition of Yeezus was released in a clear jewel box with no album artwork, reflecting the minimalist tone. The packaging consists of little more than a piece of red tape and a sticker affixed to the back, with sample credits and the album's UPC. Other versions of this release have different colors of stickers, with green, yellow and orange being some of the other colors. The front is affixed with a Parental Advisory label. The Source pointed out a resemblance between the Yeezus CD packaging and a packaging concept designed for the single "Crystal" by the English band New Order in 2001. In a 2016 BBC interview with Annie Mac, West explained the album cover; "The whole concept for the Yeezus album is that we're not going to be using CDs in the future and since this is the last time we're going to see it, this is an open casket for the CD."

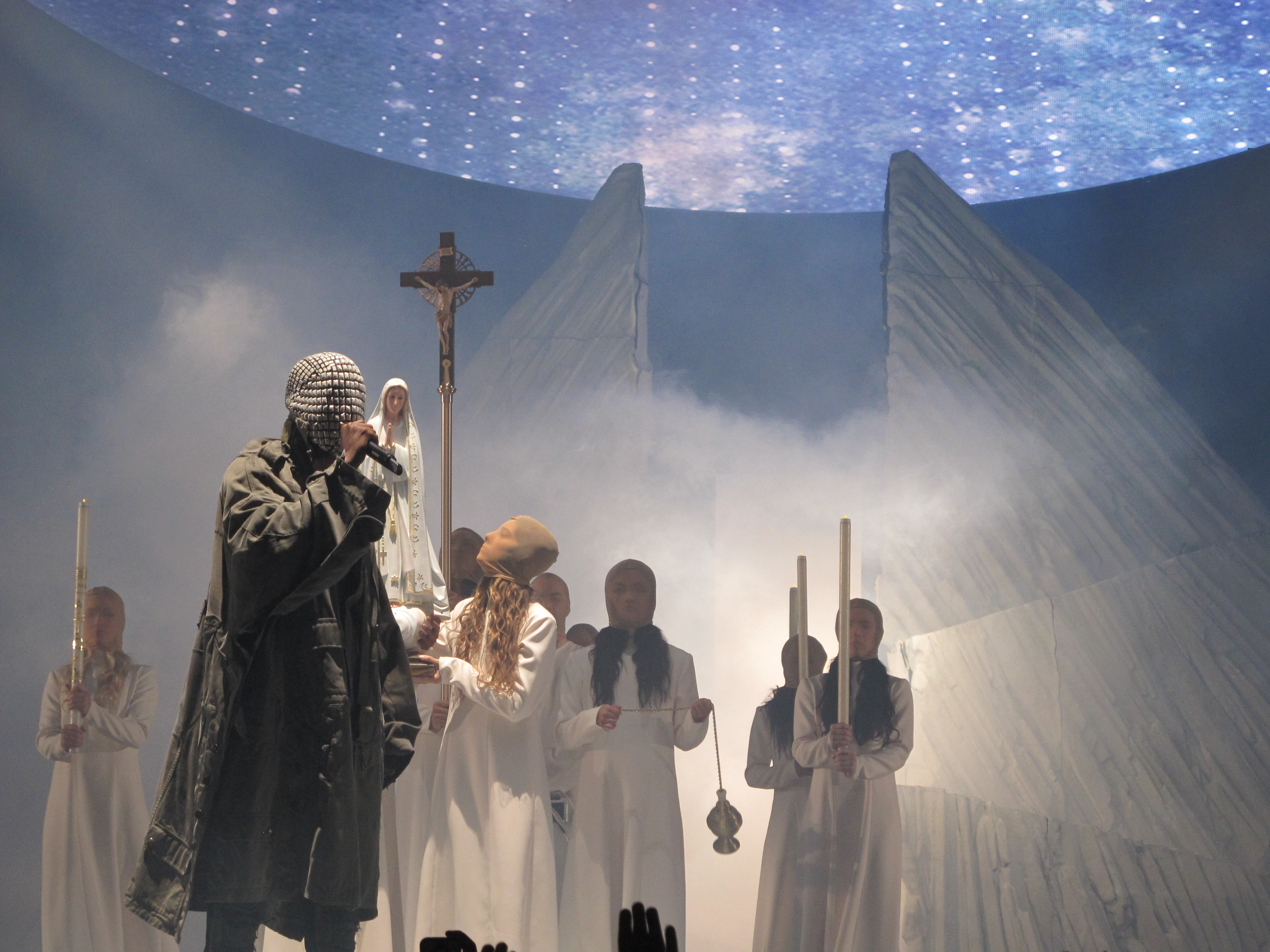
West performing in November 2013 as part of The Yeezus Tour.

Def Jam confirmed in late June 2013 that "Black Skinhead" would be serviced to American radio as the album's first single on July 2, 2013, and that a music video for the track was being produced. It was officially released to radio in the United Kingdom on June 19. The song peaked at number 69 on the US Billboard Hot 100 and 34 on the UK Singles Chart. In August 2013, it was revealed that "Bound 2" would be released as the second single from Yeezus. "Bound 2" features vocals from American soul singer Charlie Wilson and incorporates numerous samples into its production, including prominent elements of the song "Bound" (1971) by soul group Ponderosa Twins Plus One. "Bound 2" received general acclaim from music critics, who referred to the song as one of the highlights of the album and compared its soul sample-based production to West's early work from his debut studio album The College Dropout (2004). The song has since peaked at number 55 on the UK Singles Chart. In November 2013, producer Hudson Mohawke revealed that "Blood on the Leaves" would serve as the album's third single. West subsequently made the announcement in an interview on New York's 92.3 NOW.

On September 6, 2013, West announced The Yeezus Tour, a North American tour to take place between October 19 through December 7, 2013; two months prior to West's announcement, Yeezus co-producer Mike Dean had announced a tour for the album. The tour was marketed as his "first solo tour in 5 years", and featured Kendrick Lamar, Pusha T, A Tribe Called Quest, and Travis Scott as the supporting acts. On October 30, 2013, while on the road to Vancouver, a truck carrying custom-made video screens and equipment for the show was involved in a car accident, the crash damaged the equipment beyond repair. The tour resumed on November 16, 2013, at the Wells Fargo Center in Philadelphia. The missed Chicago and Detroit shows were rescheduled however, the rest of the missed dates were cancelled, Def Jam cited routing logistics as the reason.

== Critical reception ==
Yeezus ratings
Aggregate scores
Source	Rating
AnyDecentMusic?	8.2/10
Metacritic	84/100
Review scores
Source	Rating
AllMusic	5/5 stars
The Daily Telegraph	5/5 stars
Entertainment Weekly	A−
The Guardian	4/5 stars
The Independent	4/5 stars
NME	9/10
Pitchfork	9.5/10
Rolling Stone	4.5/5 stars
Spin	8/10
The Times	4/5 stars

According to the review aggregator Metacritic, Yeezus received "universal acclaim" based on a weighted average score of 84 out of 100 from 46 critic scores. Aggregator AnyDecentMusic? gave it 8.2 out of 10, based on their assessment of the critical consensus.

Reviewing the album in The Guardian, lead critic Alexis Petridis found it "noisy, gripping, maddening, potent", while Helen Brown from The Daily Telegraph said it was "the most exciting album" she had heard in some time. Jon Dolan from Rolling Stone called it a "brilliant, obsessive-compulsive career auto-correct" that made other abrasive records by "mad geniuses", such as In Utero by Nirvana and Radiohead's Kid A, seem tame by comparison. Pitchfork critic Ryan Dombal viewed it as a "razor-sharpened take" on West's fourth studio album, 808s & Heartbreak, concluding that "cohesion and bold intent are at a premium on Yeezus, perhaps more than any other Kanye album. Each fluorescent strike of noise, incongruous tempo flip, and warped vocal is bolted into its right place across the album's fast 40 minutes". Randall Roberts of the Los Angeles Times felt it was his most ambitious piece of music yet, and Evan Rytlewski from The A.V. Club said it was his most uninhibited record: "Even by the standards of an artist who reinvents himself with each release, it's a drastic departure". In a highly positive review, AllMusic's David Jeffries opined that the album was an "extravagant stunt with the high-art packed in, offering an eccentric, audacious, and gripping experience that's vital and truly unlike anything else". Ann Powers of NPR described the album as "juxtaposing avant-garde industrial and electronic innovations with the high romantic hip-hop West had already perfected." Rock artist Lou Reed reviewed Yeezus in July 2013 shortly before his death, describing it as majestic and inspiring. "He's really trying to raise the bar. No one's near doing what he's doing, it's not even on the same planet".

Some reviewers expressed reservations. In The New York Times, Jon Pareles said West's innovative transfiguration of his music—with unrefined electronica and drill elements—was undermined by his distasteful lyrics and appropriation of 1960s civil rights slogans "to his own celebrity or to bedroom exploits". In Robert Christgau's opinion, the combination of harsh rock and hip-hop sounds on Yeezus was as bold as Public Enemy's music during the 1980s, but West's lyrics were grotesquely off-putting. "He's wordsmith enough to insure that his sexist imagery is very hard to take", Christgau wrote in The Barnes & Noble Review, looking at the album as an "alt-rap also-ran". Chris Richards from The Washington Post found West's lyricism perhaps "his least compelling" yet and "drunk on bitterness", though viewed the album as "West at his most wasted, stumbling through rubble". Alex Griffin of Tiny Mix Tapes expressed similar feelings, describing it as "a nebulous, dense, paranoid web of utterly unfiltered expression that's utterly or negligibly fascinating depending on how much you care about Yeezy". In The Times, Will Hodgkinson surmised that Yeezus could have been West's masterpiece had he not become "so hopelessly self-important".

=== Accolades ===
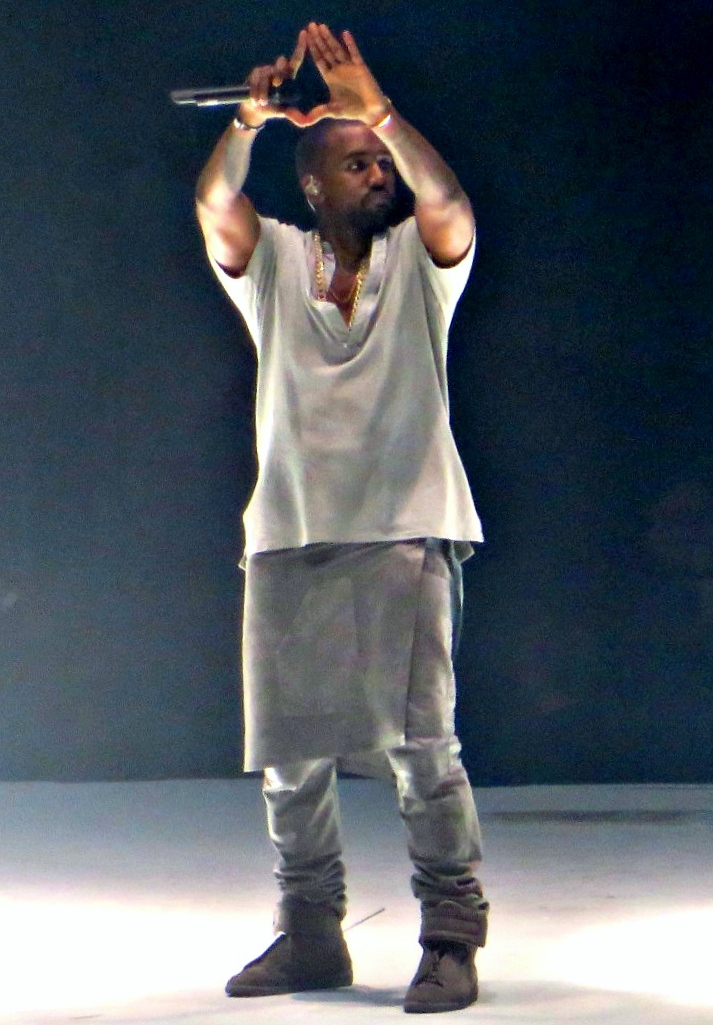
Yeezus was the most critically acclaimed album of 2013. It managed to top 18 lists and polls.

Based on 146 individual year-end top ten lists compiled by Metacritic, Yeezus was the most critically acclaimed album of 2013, appearing on 61 lists and being named first on 18 of them. In October 2013, Complex named Yeezus the sixth best hip-hop album of the last five years. Yeezus was rated as album of the year by nine publications. Spin named it the best album of 2013, writing, "Yeezus was a thorny tangram puzzle of boxy headbanger blats that exemplified a year of equally stripped-down, basal pleasures". The A.V. Club named it the best album of 2013 saying "It's magnificent, and it sounds like absolutely nothing else". Rolling Stone named it the second best album of 2013, comparing it in concept to Reed's polarizing 1975 album Metal Machine Music: "No wonder the late, great Lou Reed embraced Yeezus, since it's basically the Metal Machine Music concept translated into futuristic hip-hop, all industrial overload and hypertense egomania and hostile vibes". Exclaim! also named it the hip-hop album of the year. NME named it the second best album of the year calling it "his most sonically challenging album to date". Stereogum, Time, and Complex were also among the publications that named Yeezus the best album of 2013.

Yeezus was also nominated in two categories at the 2014 Grammy Awards including for Best Rap Album and Best Rap Song for "New Slaves". West responded unfavorably to this due to not receiving more nominations. He then addressed the National Academy of Recording Arts and Sciences at one of his concerts and referred to it as patronizing. The album received nominations for Foreign Rap Album of the Year at the Hungarian Music Awards, International Album of the Year at the Danish Music Awards, World's Best Album at the 2014 World Music Awards, and Best Album at the 2014 NME Awards.

In January 2014, Yeezus was named the best album of 2013 by The Village Voice's Pazz & Jop annual critics' poll. By topping the poll, West attained his fourth album to do so, following on from The College Dropout, Late Registration, and My Beautiful Dark Twisted Fantasy in 2004, 2005, and 2010, respectively. On the same poll for singles, "Bound 2", "New Slaves", and "Black Skinhead" were ranked in the top 10. In 2020, Rolling Stone ranked Yeezus as the 269th album on their 500 Greatest Albums of All Time list. In 2025, Resident Advisor ranked it at number 16 in their list of "The Best Electronic Records 2000–25"; contributor Kieran Press-Reynolds credited West for introducing a wider audience to uncommercial sounds, saying he "smuggled industrial beats into more homes than surely any other record this century, converting an unquantifiably large number of casuals."

Select rankings of Yeezus
Publication	List	Year	Rank	Ref.
The A.V. Club	The 23 Best Albums of 2013	2013	1	
Billboard	15 Best Albums of 2013	2013	2	
Billboard	100 Best Albums of the 2010s: Staff Picks	2019	62	
The Guardian	The Best Albums of 2013	2013	1	
The Guardian	The 100 Best Albums of the 21st Century	2019	18	
NME	50 Best Albums of 2013	2013	2	
NME	The Best Albums of the Decade: The 2010s	2019	3	
Pitchfork	The Top 50 Albums of 2013	2013	2	
Pitchfork	The 200 Best Albums of the 2010s	2019	15	
Rolling Stone	50 Best Albums of 2013	2013	2	
Rolling Stone	100 Best Albums of the 2010s	2019	13	
Rolling Stone	500 Greatest Albums of All Time	2020	269	
Rolling Stone	The 200 Greatest Hip-Hop Albums of All Time	2022	17	
Slant Magazine	The 25 Best Albums of the 2013	2013	4	
Slant Magazine	The 100 Best Albums of the 2010s	2019	41	
Spin	Spin's 50 Best Albums of 2013	2013	1	
Time	Top 10 Albums of 2013	2013	1	
The Village Voice	Pazz & Jop critics' poll of 2013	2013	1	

== Commercial performance ==
Yeezus debuted at number one on the US Billboard 200, becoming West's sixth chart-topping studio album and selling 327,000 copies in the United States in its first week. The album failed to reach the 500,000 sales projections, and marked West's lowest solo opening week sales in the US. However, it still had the third-best first week sales of 2013 at the time of release and marked the highest first week sales by a hip-hop album since Drake's 2011 album Take Care. Simultaneously, Born Sinner entered at number two on the Billboard 200 with sales of 297,000 copies, selling 30,000 less than Yeezus. The second week sales saw the album fall dramatically; although it descended two places to end at number three on the chart, sales dropped by 80% to 65,000 units, making Yeezus the largest second-week percentage drop for a number one-debuting album in 2012–13 and the fourth-largest for a number one-bowing album in the SoundScan era. Billboard's Keith Caulfield attributed the diminished figures to the non-traditional marketing, considering that the lack of singles and public appearances led the album to find "difficulty in sustaining its momentum". That same week, Born Sinner remained at number two on the Billboard 200, outselling Yeezus by nearly 20,000 units with sales of 84,000 copies. The following week, Born Sinner climbed to number one on the chart, tying the peak position attained by Yeezus previously. On August 12, 2013, Yeezus was certified gold in the US by the Recording Industry Association of America (RIAA) for sales of over 500,000 copies. By September 19, 2013, the album had sold 537,000 copies, being outperformed by the 599,000 copies sold of Born Sinner. J. Cole responded to this by commenting that he doesn't "live for the accolades" and claiming: "I'm more so about the music. Making it, and putting it out. Those are the two best feelings". Yeezus was later certified platinum in the US by the RIAA on January 8, 2014, for shipments of one million albums shipped to stores and digital retailers. Yeezus was ranked as the 37th most popular album of 2013 on the Billboard 200.

On the ARIA Albums Chart, Yeezus initially debuted at number two after selling 9,500 copies in three days, entering behind The Great Country Songbook by Troy Cassar-Daley and Adam Harvey at the summit. However, after a data error was found, a re-count of sales was done. The re-count found that Yeezus was actually the number one album of the week. ARIA issued an apology and the chart was fixed. The album stood as West's first chart topper in Australia. Yeezus reached number one on the Canadian Albums Chart, becoming West's fifth chart-topping album in Canada. In the United Kingdom, the album experienced a chart-topping performance, with it debuting at number one on the UK Albums Chart and giving West his first number one on the chart since Graduation in 2007, as well as his fourth top ten album in the UK. The following week, Yeezus descended five places to number six on the UK Albums Chart. The album was ultimately certified gold in the UK by the British Phonographic Industry (BPI) on February 20, 2015, for sales of 100,000 units. Yeezus was also a chart topper in Denmark, New Zealand and Russia. The album was the ninth best-selling cassette album in the US in 2017.

=== Public reaction ===
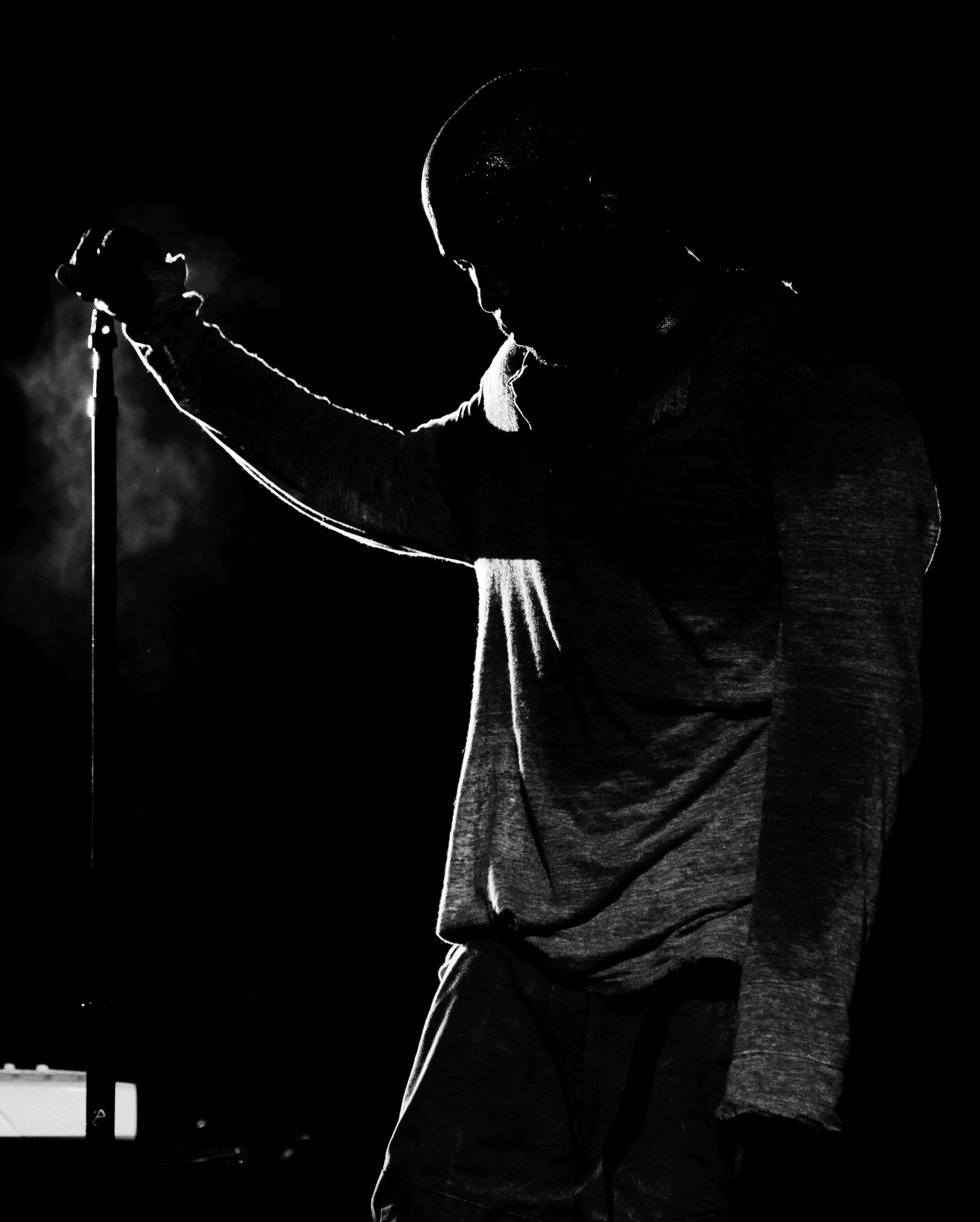
West at the Governors Ball Music Festival, where he performed several tracks from Yeezus publicly for the first time.

Public reaction to Yeezus, including its unorthodox and deliberate lack of promotion as well as its brash and aggressive sound, was mixed. Yeezus was noted as one of the most anticipated releases of 2013 by major publications, but the lack of a major radio single was regarded as a risky move. Regardless, radio stations still played tracks from Yeezus on air, despite it being a departure from the normal playlists found on hip-hop stations. "When I listen to radio, that ain't where I wanna be no more", stated West at his headlining June 9, 2013 Governor's Ball performance, where he unveiled several tracks from the record for the first time. Rolling Stone summarized the audience's response: "Half the crowd cheered, half almost audibly rolled their eyes". West's June 11 interview with Jon Caramanica of The New York Times was similarly viewed with a mixed reaction, with many outlets mocking West's seemingly vain statements. In the article, West compares himself to Apple co-founder Steve Jobs and refers to himself as "the nucleus of all society".

Within four days prior to the release, Yeezus was leaked online. The New York Times wrote that the leak "stirred up a Twitter frenzy" and received widespread media coverage. The Washington Post commented on the significance of the leak: "Kanye West’s new album didn’t leak online over the weekend. It gushed out into the pop ecosystem like a million barrels of renegade crude — ominous, mesmerizing and of great consequence". Critics were very kind to Yeezus regarding critical reviews, but others viewed the release as "musical and commercial suicide", and "fans live-blogged their own befuddlement on Twitter and Facebook". The New Yorker's Sasha Frere-Jones suggests that Yeezus may be preferred over any of West's previous works in coming decades by a new generation due to the "lean vibrancy" of the album. "One of the most fascinating aspects of Yeezus' arrival is the discursive crisis it's caused, produced by a fast-react culture colliding with a work of art so confounding", wrote The Atlantic's columnist Jack Hamilton.

West was criticized by the UK and US Parkinson's disease Associations for controversial lyrics in lead-song "On Sight". Oasis lead member Liam Gallagher criticized Yeezus over its title, saying of West: "He's a fucking idiot. You'll never see Jesus banging his head". American rapper Hopsin dissed West over the album within the lyrics of his single "Hop Is Back" in October 2013, while the music video included Hopsin reenacting one of West's numerous encounters with the paparazzi. That same month, Hopsin went on to explain the diss, admitting that he is a fan of West who likes a lot of his older music and viewing Yeezus as West "on some straight up [bullshit]".

Jay-Z described Yeezus as "polarizing", though claimed "that's what great art is" and that West "pushes the genre forward" with his experimentation. Expressing his thoughts on the mixed reception of the album in October 2013, fellow rapper Lupe Fiasco viewed himself as not facing the same difficult struggle. Lupe Fiasco continued, assuring that his then-upcoming studio album Tetsuo & Youth (2015) wouldn't be as open for interpretation as Yeezus. In February 2014, English singer Lily Allen announced that she would title her third studio album Sheezus. In an interview with Australian radio station Nova, Allen stated that she is terrified that West would think it's "a diss rather than a tribute". She said that she thinks West is brilliant and praised him for speaking his mind all the time. That same month, Jack White, a vocal advocate of analog recording, remarked that Yeezus "is obviously recorded on Pro Tools but sounds unbelievable, because it is very simple and there aren't a lot of components going on, and this really allows the songs to shine. Plus he mixed using analogue components". West went on to make the claim in October 2015 that despite many people rating My Beautiful Dark Twisted Fantasy as his best album, Yeezus is "so much stronger" in comparison. In 2013, Yeezus was voted as both the year's "Most Overrated Album" and "Most Underrated Album" by Pitchfork readers.

== Track listing ==
Yeezus track listing
No.	Title	Writer(s)	Producer(s)	Length
1.	"On Sight"	Kanye West; Guy-Manuel de Homem-Christo; Thomas Bangalter; Malik Jones; Che Smith; Elon Rutberg; Cydel Young; Derek Watkins; Mike Dean	West; Daft Punk; Dean^{[a]}; Benji B^{[a]}	2:36
2.	"Black Skinhead"	West; de Homem-Christo; Bangalter; Jones; Young; Rutberg; Wasalu Jaco; Sakiya Sandifer; Dean; Watkins	West; Daft Punk; Gesaffelstein^{[a]}; Brodinski^{[a]}; Dean^{[a]}; Lupe Fiasco^{[a]}; Jack Donoghue^{[a]}; Noah Goldstein^{[a]}	3:08
3.	"I Am a God"	West; de Homem-Christo; Bangalter; Ross Birchard; Justin Vernon; Jones; Smith; Rutberg; Young; Dean; Watkins; Clifton Bailey; Harvel Hart; Anand Bakshi; Rahul Burman	West; Dean; Daft Punk; Hudson Mohawke^{[c]}	3:51
4.	"New Slaves"	West; Christopher Breaux; Young; Ben Bronfman; Jones; Smith; Rutberg; Sandifer; Louis Johnson; Dean; Gábor Presser; Anna Adamis	West; Bronfman^{[c]}; Dean^{[a]}; Travis Scott^{[a]}; Goldstein^{[a]}; Sham Joseph^{[a]}; Che Pope^{[a]}	4:16
5.	"Hold My Liquor"	West; Dean; Vernon; Keith Cozart; Rutberg; Smith; Jones; Alejandra Ghersi; Young; Watkins	Dean; West; Arca^{[a]}; Goldstein^{[a]}	5:26
6.	"I'm in It"	West; Vernon; Jeffrey Ethan Campbell; Josh Leary; Jones; Young; Sandifer; Rutberg; Dean; Andre Harris; Jill Scott; Vidal Davis; Carvin Haggins; Kenny Lattimore	West; Evian Christ^{[c]}; Dom Solo^{[c]}; Goldstein^{[a]}; Arca^{[a]}; Dean^{[a]}	3:54
7.	"Blood on the Leaves"	West; Birchard; Rutberg; Jones; Tony Williams; Young; Dean; Lewis Allen	West; Hudson Mohawke; Lunice; Carlos Broady^{[c]}; 88-Keys^{[a]}; Dean^{[a]}; Arca^{[a]}	6:00
8.	"Guilt Trip"	West; Scott Mescudi; Young; Dean; Larry Griffin Jr.; Keith Elam; Kevin Hansford; Dupre Kelly; Chris Martin; Al-Terik Wardrick; Marlon Williams; Terrence Thornton; Tyree Pittman	West; Dean; S1; Travis Scott^{[a]}; Ackeejuice Rockers^{[a]}	4:03
9.	"Send It Up"	West; Johnson; de Homem-Christo; Bangalter; Ghersi; Mike Levy; Sandifer; Ab Liva; Rutberg; Dean; Moses Davis; Colin York; Lowell Dunbar	West; Daft Punk; Gesaffelstein^{[c]}; Brodinski^{[c]}; Arca^{[a]}; Dean^{[a]}	2:58
10.	"Bound 2"	West; John Stephens; Charles Wilson; Pope; Rutberg; Young; Jones; Sandifer; Dean; Norman Whiteside; Bob Massey; Robert Dukes; Ronnie Self	West; Pope^{[c]}; Eric Danchick^{[a]}; Goldstein^{[a]}; No I.D.^{[a]}; Dean^{[a]}	3:49
Total length:				40:01

Notes

- ^{^[c]} signifies a co-producer
- ^{^[a]} signifies an additional producer
- "I Am a God" credits God as a featured artist and features additional vocals by Justin Vernon
- "New Slaves" features additional vocals by Frank Ocean
- "Hold My Liquor" features vocals by Chief Keef and Justin Vernon
- "I'm in It" features vocals by Justin Vernon and Assassin
- "Guilt Trip" features uncredited vocals by Kid Cudi
- "Send it Up" features vocals by King L
- "Bound 2" features additional vocals by Charlie Wilson

Sample credits

- "On Sight" contains an interpolation of "Sermon (He'll Give Us What We Really Need)", written by Keith Carter Sr.
- "I Am a God" contains samples of:
  - "Forward Inna Dem Clothes", written by Clifton Bailey III and H. Hart, and performed by Capleton;
  - and "Are Zindagi Hai Khel", written by Anand Bakshi and Rahul Burman, and performed by Burman, Manna Dey and Asha Bhosle.
- "New Slaves" contains samples of "Gyöngyhajú lány", written by Gábor Presser and Anna Adamis, and performed by Omega.
- "I'm in It" contains samples of "Lately", written by Vidal Davis, Carvin Haggins, Andre Harris, Kenny Lattimore and Jill Scott, and performed by Lattimore.
- "Blood on the Leaves" contains:
  - samples of "Strange Fruit", written by Lewis Allan, as performed by Nina Simone;
  - samples of "R U Ready", composed by Ross Birchard and Lunice Jean Pierre II, and performed by TNGHT;
  - uncredited interpolations of "Down for My N's", written by Corey Miller, Calvin Broadus, Jr., Awood Johnson and Craig Lawson, and performed by C-Murder featuring Snoop Dogg and Magic.
- "Guilt Trip" contains:
  - interpolations of "Chief Rocka", written by Keith Elam, Kevin Hansford, Dupre Kelly, Christopher Martin, Alterick Wardrick and Marlon Williams, performed by Lords of the Underground;
  - samples of "Blocka" (Ackeejuice Rockers remix), written by Terrence Thornton and Tyree Pittman, and performed by Pusha T featuring Travis Scott and Popcaan.
- "Send It Up" contains a sample of "Memories", written by Anthony Moses Davis, Collin York and Lowell Dunbar, and performed by Beenie Man.
- "Bound 2" contains:
  - interpolations of "Aeroplane (Reprise)", written by Norman Whiteside, performed by Wee;
  - samples of "Bound", written by Bobby Massey and Robert Dukes, and performed by Ponderosa Twins Plus One
  - samples of "Sweet Nothin's", written by Ronnie Self, as performed by Brenda Lee.

== Personnel ==
Credits are adapted from the album's liner notes.

Technical

- Noah Goldstein – associate production, additional programming (3; SFX on 8), engineering (all), mixing (1, 6–8)
- Hudson Mohawke – production consultancy, additional programming (4)
- Arca – production consultancy, additional programming (4)
- Young Chop – production consultancy
- Ken Lewis – noises and vocal sounds creation and engineering (4), "oh" vocals creation (6), choir production (1)
- Tammy Infusino – "oh" vocals creation (6)
- Che Pope – additional programming (3)
- Travis Scott – additional programming (3)
- Anthony Kilhoffer – engineering (1–8, 10), mixing (4, 9)
- Mike Dean – engineering (1–6, 8)
- Andrew Dawson – engineering (1, 9)
- Brent Kolatalo – engineering (6)
- Marc Portheau – engineering assistance (all)
- Khoï Huynh – engineering assistance (all)
- Raoul Le Pennec – engineering assistance (all)
- Nabil Essemlani – engineering assistance (all)
- Keith Parry – engineering assistance (all)
- Kenta Yonesaka – engineering assistance (1–5, 7, 8)
- David Rowland – engineering assistance (1–5, 7, 8)
- Sean Oakley – engineering assistance (1, 2, 4–8), mixing assistance (1, 4, 6–9)
- Eric Lynn – engineering assistance (1, 2, 4–8), mixing assistance (1, 4, 6–9)
- Dave "Squirrel" Covell – engineering assistance (1, 2, 4–8), mixing assistance (1, 4, 6–9)
- Josh Smith – engineering assistance (1, 2, 4–8), mixing assistance (1, 4, 6–9)
- Kevin Matela – engineering assistance (4)
- Mat Arnold – engineering assistance (6, 8)
- Dale – engineering assistance (6)
- Damien Prost – engineering assistance (7)
- Manny Marroquin – mixing (2, 3, 5, 10)
- Delbert Bowers – mixing assistance (2, 3, 5, 10)
- Chris Galland – mixing assistance (2, 3, 5, 10)
- Kyle Ross – mixing assistance (4)
- Uri Djemal – choir engineering (1)
- Vlado Meller – mastering
- Mark Santangelo – assistant mastering engineering
- Chris Gehringer – mastering (2)

Musicians

- Mike Dean – additional instrumentation (guitar solo on 5; bass, guitar on 10)
- Chris "Hitchcock" Chorney – additional instrumentation (cellos on 8)
- Dylan Wissing – drums (1)
- Matt Teitelman – percussion (1)
- Alvin Fields – choir direction (1)
- Carmen Roman – choir (1)
- K. Nita – choir (1)
- John Morgan – choir (1)
- Jessenia Pena – choir (1)
- Ronnie Artis – choir (1)
- Crystal Brun – choir (1)
- Sean Drew – choir (1)
- Natalis Ruby Rubero – choir (1)
- Lorraine Berry – choir (1)
- Gloria Ryann – choir (1)
- Timeka Lee – choir (1)
- Matthew Williams – music consultancy
- Benji B – Donda music consultancy

Artwork

- Kanye West – creative direction, art direction
- Virgil Abloh – art direction
- Matthew Williams – art direction
- Justin Saunders – Donda art direction
- Joe Perez – Donda graphic design
- Jim Joe 13 – illustration and type treatment for Donda
- Todd Russell – art production
- Kristen Yiengst – art production
- Alex Haldi – art production
- Andrew Zaeh – art production
- Meredith Truax – art production
- Tai Linzie – art production
- The DGS Team – art production

== Charts ==
=== Weekly charts ===
Chart performance for Yeezus
Chart (2013–2026)	Peak position
Australian Albums (ARIA)	1
Australian Urban Albums (ARIA)	1
Austrian Albums (Ö3 Austria)	22
Belgian Albums (Ultratop Flanders)	4
Belgian Albums (Ultratop Wallonia)	22
Canadian Albums (Billboard)	1
Croatian Albums (HDU)	4
Czech Albums (ČNS IFPI)	32
Danish Albums (Hitlisten)	1
Dutch Albums (Album Top 100)	16
Finnish Albums (Suomen virallinen lista)	13
French Albums (SNEP)	12
German Albums (Offizielle Top 100)	15
Greek Albums (IFPI)	27
Hungarian Physical Albums (MAHASZ)	27
Irish Albums (IRMA)	4
Italian Albums (FIMI)	40
Japanese Albums (Oricon)	25
New Zealand Albums (RMNZ)	1
Norwegian Albums (VG-lista)	2
Polish Albums (ZPAV)	41
Portuguese Albums (AFP)	176
Russian Albums (2M)	1
Scottish Albums (Official Charts)	4
South Korean Albums (Gaon)	19
Spanish Albums (Promusicae)	78
Swedish Albums (Sverigetopplistan)	21
Swiss Albums (Schweizer Hitparade)	6
UK Albums (Official Charts)	1
UK R&B Albums (Official Charts)	1
US Billboard 200	1
US Top R&B/Hip-Hop Albums (Billboard)	1

=== Year-end charts ===
Year-end chart performance
Chart (2013)	Position
Australian Albums (ARIA)	65
Belgian Albums (Ultratop Flanders)	147
Canadian Albums (Billboard)	38
Danish Albums (Hitlisten)	66
UK Albums (OCC)	112
US Billboard 200	37
US Top R&B/Hip-Hop Albums (Billboard)	12

Year-end chart performance
Chart (2014)	Position
Australian Urban Albums (ARIA)	26
US Top R&B/Hip-Hop Albums (Billboard)	38

Year-end chart performance
Chart (2015)	Position
Australian Urban Albums (ARIA)	76

Year-end chart performance
Chart (2016)	Position
Australian Urban Albums (ARIA)	83

Year-end chart performance
Chart (2021)	Position
Icelandic Albums (Tónlistinn)	55

Year-end chart performance
Chart (2022)	Position
Icelandic Albums (Tónlistinn)	33

Year-end chart performance
Chart (2023)	Position
Icelandic Albums (Tónlistinn)	58

== Certifications ==
Certifications and sales
Region	Certification	Certified units/sales
Australia (ARIA)	Gold	35,000^{^}
Denmark (IFPI Danmark)	Platinum	20,000^{‡}
New Zealand (RMNZ)	2× Platinum	30,000^{‡}
United Kingdom (BPI)	Gold	100,000^{*}
United States (RIAA)	3× Platinum	3,000,000^{‡}
^{*} Sales figures based on certification alone.^{^} Shipments figures based on certification alone.^{‡} Sales+streaming figures based on certification alone.

== Release history ==
Release dates and formats
Region	Date	Label(s)	Format(s)	Ref.
Australia	June 18, 2013	Universal	CD; digital download	
Germany	June 18, 2013	Universal	CD; digital download	
New Zealand	June 18, 2013	Def Jam	CD; digital download	
United States	June 18, 2013	Def Jam; Roc-A-Fella	CD; digital download	
France	June 21, 2013	Universal	CD; digital download	
United Kingdom	June 22, 2013	Virgin EMI	CD; digital download	

== See also ==
- 2013 in hip-hop
- Born Sinner
- "Hop Is Back"
- List of number-one albums of 2013 (Australia)
- List of number-one albums of 2013 (Canada)
- List of UK top-ten albums in 2013
- List of UK R&B Albums Chart number ones of 2013
- List of Billboard 200 number-one albums of 2013
- List of Billboard number-one R&B/hip-hop albums of 2013
- List of Billboard number-one rap albums of 2013
- List of number-one albums from the 2010s (Denmark)
- List of number-one albums from the 2010s (New Zealand)
- List of UK Albums Chart number ones of the 2010s
- Sheezus
- Tetsuo & Youth
