= Hip Hop Ride =

1994 single by Da Youngsta's

Single by Da Youngsta's

from the album No Mercy
- Released: August 1994
- Recorded: 1993–1994
- Genre: Hip-hop
- Length: 4:19
- Label: East West; Atlantic
- Songwriters: Q. Goodman; T. Goodman; T. Dawson; C. Harte
- Producer: Marley Marl

Da Youngsta's singles chronology
"Wild Child" (1993)	"Hip Hop Ride" (1994)	"Mad Props" (1995)

Music video
- "Hip Hop Ride" on YouTube

"Hip Hop Ride" is a song by American hip hop group Da Youngsta's, released in August 1994 as the lead single from their third studio album, No Mercy (1994). It was produced by Marley Marl and is the group's biggest hit. In the song, the group pays homage to many rappers and their songs.

== Critical reception ==
The Source praised Marley Marl's production, remarking it evokes "vivid memories" and causes listeners to think about all the hip-hop artists referenced in the lyrics. In 2012, Complex included the song on their list "The 50 Best Philadelphia Rap Songs".

== Charts ==
Chart (1994)	Peak position
US Billboard Hot 100	68
US Hot R&B/Hip-Hop Songs (Billboard)	62
US Hot Rap Songs (Billboard)	21
US Cash Box Top 100	86
