= Between a Rock and a Hard Place (Artifacts album) =

Studio album by Artifacts
- Released: October 25, 1994
- Studio: Soundtrack (New York, NY); Chung King (New York, NY)
- Genre: Hip-hop
- Length: 50:16
- Label: Big Beat; Atlantic
- Producer: Buckwild; Drew; Redman; T-Ray

Artifacts chronology
| Between a Rock and a Hard Place (1994) | That's Them (1997) |

Singles from Between a Rock and a Hard Place
- 1. "Wrong Side of da Tracks" Released: 1994; 2. "C'mon wit da Git Down" Released: 1994; 3. "Dynamite Soul" Released: 1995

Between a Rock and a Hard Place is the debut studio album by American hip-hop duo Artifacts. It was released on October 25, 1994, via Big Beat/Atlantic Records. The recording sessions took place at Soundtrack Studios in New York, except for the song "Cummin' Thru Ya Fuckin' Block", which was recorded at Chung King Studios. The album was produced by T-Ray, Buckwild, Drew and Redman, with co-producers Rockwilder and Artifacts. It features guest appearances from Jay Burns Jaya, Redman and Busta Rhymes.

The album debuted at number 137 on the Billboard 200, number 17 on the Top R&B/Hip-Hop Albums and number 2 on the Heatseekers Albums charts in the United States. It was supported with three singles: "Wrong Side of da Tracks", "C'mon wit da Git Down" and "Dynamite Soul".

== Critical reception ==
Professional ratings
Review scores
| Source | Rating |
|---|---|
| AllMusic | 4/5 stars |
| RapReviews | 9/10 |
| The Source | 4/5 stars |

The Washington Post concluded, "By the fourth or fifth cut ... the monotony of blunt smoking and murdering MCs is enough to grate even the most ardent rap enthusiast, and the hardcore lyrics, at times wonderfully twisted, simply become annoying."

== Track listing ==
| No. | Title | Writer(s) | Producer(s) | Length |
|---|---|---|---|---|
| 1. | "Drama (Mortal Kombat Fatality)" | | Drew | 1:31 |
| 2. | "C'mon wit da Git Down" | Rahem Ross Brown; William E. Williams; Anthony Best; Galt MacDermot | Buckwild | 4:04 |
| 3. | "Wrong Side of da Tracks" | Brown; Williams; Todd Ray; Henry Anadon | T-Ray | 4:20 |
| 4. | "Heavy Ammunition" | Brown; Williams; Ray | T-Ray | 4:07 |
| 5. | "Attack of New Jeruzalum" (featuring Jay Burns Jaya) | Brown; Williams; Jere Oxendine; Best | Buckwild | 4:24 |
| 6. | "Notty Headed Nigguhz" | Brown; Williams; Ray | T-Ray | 3:27 |
| 7. | "Whayback" | Brown; Williams; Ray | T-Ray | 4:47 |
| 8. | "Flexi with da Tech(nique)" | Brown; Williams; Ray | T-Ray | 4:08 |
| 9. | "Cummin' Thru Ya Fuckin' Block" (featuring Redman) | Brown; Williams; Reginald Noble | Redman; Rockwilder (co.) | 4:21 |
| 10. | "Lower da Boom" | Brown; Williams; Ray | T-Ray | 5:11 |
| 11. | "What Goes On?" | Brown; Williams; Best | Buckwild | 3:33 |
| 12. | "Dynamite Soul" | Brown; Williams; Ray | T-Ray | 3:51 |
| 13. | "Whassup Now Muthafucka?" | Brown; Williams; Ray | T-Ray | 2:25 |
| 14. | "C'mon wit da Git Down (Remix)" (featuring Busta Rhymes) | | Buckwild | 3:43 |
| Total length: | | | | 50:16 |

2012 reissue edition bonus tracks
| No. | Title | Producer(s) | Length |
|---|---|---|---|
| 15. | "Dynamite Soul II (Lip Service Remix)" (featuring Mad Skillz) | Ez Elpee | 3:51 |
| 16. | "It's Gettin' Hot" | K-Def | 4:18 |

Sample credits

- Track 3 contains material from "Bubble Gum" performed by 9th Creation.
- Track 4 contains material performed by EPMD.
- Track 6 contains material performed by Redman.
- Track 7 contains material performed by Just-Ice.
- Track 10 contains material performed by Michael Franks.
- Track 11 contains material performed by Buster Williams.

== Charts ==
| Chart (1994) | Peak position |
|---|---|
| US Billboard 200 | 137 |
| US Top R&B/Hip-Hop Albums (Billboard) | 17 |
| US Heatseekers Albums (Billboard) | 2 |
