= What I'm After =

What I'm After may refer to:

- "What I'm After" (Ratt song)
- "What I'm After" (Lords of the Underground song)
