= Unusual =

Unusual or The Unusual or The Unusuals may refer to:

== Film and TV ==
- The Unusuals, a 2009 TV series.

== Music ==
=== Albums ===
- The Unusual, 2006 album El Da Sensei
- Unusual, 2006 album by Giuni Russo

=== Songs ===
- Unusual (song) Trey Songz
- "Unusual", song by Francesca Battistelli from If We're Honest
- "Unusual" (Persian: غیر معمولی), song by Mohsen Chavoshi

== See also ==
- Anomaly (disambiguation)
- Wikipedia:Unusual articles
- Category:Lists of things considered unusual
