= The Unusual =

Studio album by El Da Sensei
- Released: February 28, 2006
- Studios: Pete's Crib (New Jersey); Big Trouble In Little China Studios (Bloomfield, NJ); Safe House Studios (New Jersey); It Is What It Is Studios (Weehawken, NJ); K-Hill Studios (Durham, NC); Madd Bass Studio (East Orange, NJ)
- Genre: Hip hop
- Length: 50:03
- Label: Fat Beats
- Producers: 3rd Rell; DJ Revolution; Frequency; Fusion Unlimited; Fyre Dept.; Illmind; Jake One; J. Rawls; K-Def; Money Mark; Saukrates

El Da Sensei chronology
Relax, Relate, Release (2003)	The Unusual (2006)	Unheard Of (2008)

Professional ratings
Review scores
Source	Rating
AllHipHop	3.5/5 stars
Cokemachineglow	72/100%
HipHopDX	3.5/5
PopMatters	7/10
RapReviews	7/10

The Unusual is the second solo studio album by American rapper El Da Sensei. It was released on February 28, 2006 via Fat Beats Records. Recording sessions took place at Pete's Crib, Big Trouble In Little China Studios, Safe House Studios, It Is What It Is Studios and Madd Bass Studio in New Jersey, and K-Hill Studios in Durham. Production was handled by Fusion Unlimited, Illmind, J. Rawls, 3rd Rell, DJ Revolution, Frequency, Fyre Dept., Jake One, K-Def, Money Mark and Saukrates. It features guest appearances from O.C. and Sean Price.

== Background ==
Tame and El's graf-rap was well received by underground audiences and continued in the New Jersey rap tradition of Redman and Lords of the Underground. The group developed a fan base of hardcore hip-hoppers, being graffiti artists and hip-hop purists. El Da Sensei latest album is a continuation of the first two Artifacts albums. According to El, the album "stands for true hip hop."

El has said that the possibility of an Artifacts reunion are low, considering the relative success he and Tame One have had since both going solo.

== Critical reception ==
The Unusual was met with generally favourable reviews from music critics, considering El Da Sensei's lengthy hiatus. Steven J. Horowitz of PopMatters wrote that the rapper "manages to present his album with intelligent proportions, and like a fine wine, he will only get better with time".

== Track listing ==
No.	Title	Producer(s)	Length
1.	"Crown Pleasa"	Illmind	3:57
2.	"Natural Feel Good"	Frequency	4:04
3.	"Hold On"	Illmind	4:04
4.	"Live in the Flesh"	Fusion Unlimited	3:30
5.	"Lights, Camera, Action!"	J. Rawls	4:02
6.	"That's How It Goes"	Saukrates	3:32
7.	"Up in Da Spot!"	Money Mark	3:43
8.	"Rock It Out!"	K-Def	3:11
9.	"Nuttin' to Lose" (featuring O.C.)	Fyre Dept.	2:55
10.	"Gunblast"	Jake One	3:14
11.	"Blow Shit Up!" (Army Edition)	J. Rawls	3:23
12.	"What's My Name?"	DJ Revolution	4:07
13.	"No Matter" (featuring Sean Price)	3rd Rell	4:15
14.	"The Unusual"	Fusion Unlimited	2:06
Total length:			50:03
