= House of Lords (Lords of the Underground album) =

Studio album by Lords of the Underground
- Released: August 21, 2007
- Recorded: 2006–2007
- Genre: Hip hop
- Label: Affluent Records
- Producer: Marley Marl; K-Def; DJ Lord Jazz

Lords of the Underground chronology
| Resurrection (1999) | House of Lords (2007) | So Legendary (2025) |

House of Lords is the fourth album by Lords of the Underground, its first album in eight years. The album was released August 21, 2007, on Affluent Records and was produced by Marley Marl, K-Def, and DJ Lord Jazz. Like the group's previous album Resurrection the album received very little promotion, was a commercial failure, and it did not make it to the Billboard charts, nor did it produce any hit singles.

== Track listing ==
The track listing for House of Lords is:

1. "Intro"- 0:44
2. "I Love Hip Hop"- 3:14
3. "Fab 3"- 3:22
4. "English Mami"- 3:38
5. "Yes Were Fresh"- 3:20
6. "Belly of the Beast"- 3:53
7. "Hum It Out"- 3:22
8. "Slick Talk"- 3:25
9. "Say My Name"- 3:54
10. "No Pass"- 2:37
11. "To Love Me"- 4:02
12. "The Clinic"- 3:32
13. "Certified"- 2:47
14. "What Yall Wanna Know"- 3:26
15. "What Is an MC"- 3:21
16. "Remember Me"- 3:39
