= Tic Toc (Lords of the Underground song) =

1994 single by Lords of the Underground

Single by Lords of the Underground

from the album Keepers of the Funk
- Released: October 11, 1994
- Recorded: 1993–1994
- Genre: Hip hop
- Length: 3:51
- Label: Pendulum; Capitol
- Songwriter: Lords of the Underground
- Producer: Marley Marl

Lords of the Underground singles chronology
| "Flow On" (1994) | "Tic Toc" (1994) | "What I'm After" (1995) |

"Tic Toc" is the lead single released from the Lords of the Underground's second album, Keepers of the Funk. Produced by Marley Marl, with the group's DJ Lord Jazz providing scratches, "Tic Toc" was the Lords' last single to reach the Billboard Hot 100, peaking at 73 on that chart, while also making it to 17 on the Hot Rap Singles chart. The song samples Doug E. Fresh and Slick Rick's "La Di Da Di".

== Single track listing ==
=== A-Side ===
1. "Tic Toc" (Rumble Mix)- 3:53
2. "Tic Toc" (TV Mix)- 3:53
3. "Tic Toc" (Acapella)- 3:53

=== B-Side ===
1. "Tic Toc" (Remix)- 4:45
2. "Tic Toc" (TV Remix)- 4:45
3. "Tic Toc" (Rumblin' Instrumental)- 3:53

== Charts ==
| Chart | Position |
|---|---|
| US Billboard Hot 100 | 73 |
| US R&B / Hip-Hop | 52 |
| US Hot Rap Singles | 17 |
| US Hot Dance Music/Maxi-Singles Sales | 16 |
