= The Aftermath (Da Youngsta's album) =

Studio album by Da Youngsta's
- Released: April 20, 1993
- Recorded: 1992–1993
- Studio: Sigma Sound Studios (Philadelphia, PA); Platinum Island Studio (New York, NY); Greene Street Studio (New York, NY); Unique Studios (New York, NY); Another House Of Hits Joint (New York, NY); East Hill Studios (New York, NY); D&D Studios (New York, NY)
- Genre: East Coast hip hop; hardcore hip hop; boom bap
- Length: 46:43
- Label: EastWest
- Producer: 118th Street Productions; DJ Premier; L.G. The Teacher; Marley Marl; Pete Rock; Qur'an "Q Ball" Goodman; The Beatnuts

Da Youngsta's chronology
Somethin 4 Da Youngsta's (1992)	The Aftermath (1993)	No Mercy (1994)

Singles from The Aftermath
- 1. "Crewz Pop" Released: March 11, 1993; 2. "Iz U wit Me" Released: July 15, 1993; 3. "Wild Child" Released: September 30, 1993

Professional ratings
Review scores
Source	Rating
AllMusic	4/5 stars
Entertainment Weekly	B−
MusicHound R&B: The Essential Album Guide	3/5 stars
The Source	3/5 stars

The Aftermath is the second studio album by the American hip hop group Da Youngsta's. It was released on April 20, 1993, via EastWest Records America. Recording sessions took place at Sigma Sound Studios in Philadelphia, Platinum Island Studio, Greene Street Studio, Unique Recording Studios, Another House Of Hits Joint, East Hill Studios and D&D Studios in New York City. Production was handled by Q Ball, The Beatnuts, 118th Street Productions, Marley Marl, Pete Rock, DJ Premier and L.G. The Teacher. It features guest appearances from CL Smooth, Lt. Stitchie, Pete Rock and Treach.

In the United States, the album peaked at number 126 on the Billboard 200, number 25 on the Top R&B/Hip-Hop Albums and number 4 on the Heatseekers Albums charts. It was supported with three singles: "Crewz Pop", "Iz U wit Me" and "Wild Child". The album also has a notably more aggressive and edgy tone compared to their first effort.

== Track listing ==
No.	Title	Writer(s)	Producer(s)	Length
1.	"The Aftermath"	Qur'an Goodman	Q Ball	0:27
2.	"Wild Child"	Q. Goodman; Taji Goodman; Tarik Dawson; Ann Goodman; Jerry Tineo	The Beatnuts	3:54
3.	"Iz U wit Me"	Q. Goodman; T. Goodman; Dawson; A. Goodman; Peter Phillips; Corey Penn	Pete Rock	3:59
4.	"Handle This"	Anthony Criss; Vincent E. Brown; Kier Gist	118th Street Productions	3:03
5.	"Crewz Pop" (featuring Treach)	Criss; Brown; Gist	118th Street Productions	2:57
6.	"Lyrical Stick Up Kids"	Q. Goodman; T. Goodman; Dawson; Al'Terik Wardrick; Dupré Kelly	Marley Marl	4:33
7.	"Who's the Mic Wrecka" (featuring Pete Rock & CL Smooth)	Q. Goodman; T. Goodman; Dawson; A. Goodman; Phillips; Penn	Pete Rock	5:07
8.	"Count It Off"	Q. Goodman; T. Goodman; Dawson; Emanuel Parks	L.G. The Teacher	2:17
9.	"Honeycomb Hide Out" (featuring Lt. Stitchie)	Q. Goodman; T. Goodman; Dawson; A. Goodman; Cleveland Laing; Victor Padilla	The Beatnuts	4:41
10.	"Da Hood"	Q. Goodman; A. Goodman	Q Ball	3:55
11.	"It'z Natural"	Q. Goodman; T. Goodman; Dawson; A. Goodman; Padilla	The Beatnuts	2:54
12.	"Rip a Rhyme"	Q. Goodman; T. Goodman; Dawson; Marlon Williams	Marley Marl	3:29
13.	"Wake Em Up"	Q. Goodman; T. Goodman; Dawson	DJ Premier	3:37
14.	"Shout It Out"	Q. Goodman; T. Goodman; Dawson	Q Ball; Reek Geez (co.)	1:50
Total length:				46:43

Sample credits

- Track 3 contains elements from "360° (What Goes Around)" written by Maxwell Dixon and performed by Grand Puba.
- Track 5 contains elements from "Kool's Back Again" a/k/a/ "Kool Is Back" written by Gene Redd Sr. and Jimmy Crosby.
- Track 6 contains elements from "Hip Hop Junkies" performed by Nice & Smooth and "It's Just Begun" written by Gerry Thomas, Jimmy Castor and John Pruitt and performed by the Jimmy Castor Bunch.
- Track 7 contains elements from "Bubble Gum" written by Henry Anadon and performed by the 9th Creation and "Superman Lover" written and performed by Johnny "Guitar" Watson.
- Track 9 contains a sample from "Turbulence" written and performed by Eddie Harris.
- Track 11 contains elements from "E.V.A." performed by Jean-Jacques Perrey.
- Track 12 contains elements from "Mama Feel Good" written by James Brown and Lyn Collins and performed by Lyn Collins.
- Track 14 contains a sample from "Armed & Extremely Funky" by the Tuff City Squad.

== Charts ==
Chart (1993)	Peak position
US Billboard 200	126
US Top R&B/Hip-Hop Albums (Billboard)	25
US Heatseekers Albums (Billboard)	4
