= What I'm After (Lords of the Underground song) =

Single by Lords of the Underground

from the album Keepers of the Funk
- Released: February 21, 1995
- Recorded: 1994
- Genre: Hip hop
- Length: 4:19
- Label: Pendulum/Capitol
- Songwriter(s): Lords of the Underground
- Producer(s): K-Def, Lords of the Underground

Lords of the Underground singles chronology
"Tic Toc" (1994)	"What I'm After" (1995)	"Faith" (1995)

"What I'm After" is the second single released from the Lords of the Underground's second album, Keepers of the Funk. Produced by K-Def, with the group serving as co-producers, "What I'm After" was a minor hit on the rap charts, peaking at 32 on the chart. The song samples Trouble Funk's "Pump Me Up" and fellow New Jersey native Redman's "Tonight's da Night". The promotional music video was directed by Diane Martel, her second Lords of the Underground video after "Chief Rocka", and featured a cameo appearance by Redman.

== Single track listing ==
=== A-Side ===
1. "What I'm After" (Rumble Mix)- 4:19
2. "What I'm After" (TV Mix)- 4:19
3. "What I'm After" (Accapella)- 4:04

=== B-Side ===
1. "What I'm After" (Extended DJ Mix)- 5:55
2. "What I'm After" (Instrumental)- 4:19
3. "What I'm After" (Beat Box Bonus Beats)- 2:21

== Charts ==
Chart (1995)	Peak position
Billboard Hot Rap Singles	32
Billboard Hot Dance Music/Maxi-Singles Sales	28
