= The Pretty Toney Album =

Studio album by Ghostface
- Released: April 20, 2004
- Genre: Hip-hop
- Length: 52:13
- Labels: Starks; Def Jam
- Producers: Ghostface; RZA; True Master; No I.D.; Nottz; Emile

Ghostface chronology
Bulletproof Wallets (2001)	The Pretty Toney Album (2004)	718 (2004)

Wu-Tang Clan solo chronology
The Lex Diamond Story (2003)	The Pretty Toney Album (2004)	Tical 0: The Prequel (2004)

Singles from The Pretty Toney Album
- 1. "Tush" Released: March 14, 2004; 2. "Run" Released: 2003

The Pretty Toney Album is the fourth solo album by the American hip-hop artist Ghostface. Originally scheduled for a February 2004 release (as found on the cover art for the Run CD single), the album was released on April 20, 2004, by Starks Enterprises and Def Jam. It is the only album from the artist to be released solely under the moniker "Ghostface" ("Killah" is entirely omitted in any reference to his name on the packaging), and is the first of his albums not to feature any other members of the Wu-Tang Clan.

The album cover is a photograph taken from his performance of the song "Summertime" with Beyoncé at Jay-Z's farewell concert at Madison Square Garden in November 2003. It is an interpolation of the cover of Doug E. Fresh's album The World's Greatest Entertainer. The oversized jewelry he is seen wearing in the photograph was given to him prior to his performance by rapper Slick Rick, as seen in the film "Fade to Black".

== Critical reception ==
Professional ratings
Aggregate scores
Source	Rating
Metacritic	84/100
Review scores
Source	Rating
AllMusic	3/5 stars
Blender	4/5 stars
Entertainment Weekly	A−
HipHopDX	4.5/5
Mojo	4/5 stars
Pitchfork	8.2/10
Rolling Stone	3/5 stars
The Rolling Stone Album Guide	4/5 stars
Spin	A
Vibe	4/5

The Pretty Toney Album received acclaim from music critics. At Metacritic, which assigns a normalized rating out of 100 to reviews from critics, the album received an average score of 84, which indicates "universal acclaim", based on 14 reviews. David Jeffries of AllMusic said, "The Pretty Toney Album has a lack of Wu-related references on it. It's Ghostface's album entirely and all the better for it." Tiny Mix Tapes said, "It exemplifies all of the elements that Ghostface has been successful with in the past. Unfortunately, The Pretty Toney Album falls short in replacing what Raekwon had contributed to Ghost's previous album releases, causing the album to feel essentially incomplete."

Rollie Pemberton of Pitchfork said, "Expectedly, minor shortcomings hold the record back from classic status. The lack of his usual obligatory Raekwon collaboration hurts Pretty Toney's variety, and the skits, despite featuring topics and idiosyncratic raps far above the standards of his contemporaries, tend to bog down the album's progress. But all things considered, Pretty Toney far surpasses 2001's Bulletproof Wallets, finally finding the missing link between street cred and commercial respect."

== Commercial performance ==
The Pretty Toney Album debuted and peaked at number 6 on the Billboard 200, with first week sales of 69,000 copies.

== Track listing ==
No.	Title	Writer(s)	Producer(s)	Length
1.	"Intro"	Dennis David Coles; Emile Haynie; Tommy Youngblood	Emile Haynie	2:28
2.	"Biscuits" (featuring Trife da God)	Coles; Derrick Harris	True Master	3:24
3.	"Kunta Fly Shit"	Coles; Robert Fitzgerald Diggs	RZA	1:00
4.	"Beat the Clock"	Coles; Mark Richardson; Woodrow Wilson Johnson	Minnesota	2:49
5.	"Metal Lungies" (featuring Sheek Louch and Styles P)	Coles; Ernest Dion Wilson; Sean Divine Jacobs; David Styles; Ron Muhammad	No I.D.	3:07
6.	"Bathtub" (skit)	Sylvia Robinson; Larry Roberts		1:35
7.	"Save Me Dear"	Coles; Kenny Gamble; Leon Huff	Ghostface	3:02
8.	"It's Over"	Coles; Kevin Hansford; Herb Magidson; Allie Wrubel	K-Def	4:10
9.	"Keisha's House" (skit)	Coles		1:04
10.	"Tush" (featuring Missy Elliott)	Coles; Derek Trotman; Jeff Steinbacher; Robert Lee; Robert Curington	Derrick Trotman; Dub Dot Z	3:24
11.	"Last Night" (skit)	Coles	K-Def	2:31
12.	"Holla" (featuring Allah Real)	Coles; Thomas Randolph Bell; William Hart	Mario Caruso; Ghostface	3:19
13.	"Ghostface"	Coles; Darrell Branch; Kurtis Walker	Digga	2:38
14.	"Be This Way"	Coles; Dominick Lamb; Morris Dollison Jr.	Nottz	4:09
15.	"The Letter" (skit)	Coles		1:21
16.	"Tooken Back" (featuring Jacki-O)	Coles; Angela Brookins-Gillispie; Lamb; Pervis Staples; Hart	Nottz	5:04
17.	"Run" (featuring Jadakiss)	Coles; Jason Terrance Phillips; Diggs	RZA	3:19
18.	"Love" (featuring Musiq Soulchild and K. Fox)	Coles; Wilson; Jan Crutchfield; Taalib Johnson; Carvin Higgins	No I.D.	3:38
Total length:				52:13

Leftover Tracks

- "Tony's Money"
- "The Drummer" (featuring Method Man, Trife da God and Streetlife)
- "New Splash (No, No, No)"

Sample credits

- "Intro" contains a sample of "Tobacco Road" by Tommy Youngblood.
- "Biscuits" contains a sample of "I Can't Stand Up For Falling Down" by Sam & Dave.
- "Kunta Fly Shit" contains a sample of "Survival" by Annette Peacock.
- "Beat The Clock" contains a sample of "Since I Fell For You" by Laura Lee.
- "Metal Lungies" contains a sample of "Nobody Knows" by Operation Breadbasket Orchestra and Choir.
- "Bathtub" (skit) contains a sample of "Not On The Outside" by The Moments.
- "Save Me Dear" contains a sample of "(You) Got What I Need" by Freddie Scott.
- "It's Over" contains a sample of "I'm Afraid The Masquerade Is Over" by David Porter.
- "Tush" contains a sample of "Naked Truth" by The Best of Both Worlds.
- "Last Night" (skit) contains a sample of "Last Night Changed It All" by Esther Williams.
- "Holla" contains a sample of "La La (Means I Love You)" by The Delfonics.
- "Ghostface" contains a sample of "AJ Scratch" by Kurtis Blow.
- "Be This Way" contains a sample of "(We'll Always Be) Together" by Billy Stewart.
- "The Letter" (skit) contains a sample of "Sunday" by Silvia Robinson.
- "Tooken Back" contains a sample of "Take Me Back" by The Emotions.
- "Run" contains a sample of "Hogin Machine" by Les Baxter.
- "Love" contains a sample of "Statue of a Fool" by David Ruffin.

== Charts ==
Chart (2004)	Peak position
Canadian Albums (Nielsen SoundScan)	38
Canadian R&B Albums (Nielsen SoundScan)	22
US Billboard 200	6
US Top R&B/Hip-Hop Albums (Billboard)	4
