= Resurrection (Lords of the Underground album) =

Studio album by Lords of the Underground
- Released: April 6, 1999
- Recorded: 1997–1998
- Genre: Hip hop
- Length: 53:56
- Label: Jersey Kidz Records
- Producer: DJ Lord Jazz; K-Def

Lords of the Underground chronology
Keepers of the Funk (1994)	Resurrection (1999)	House of Lords (2007)

Professional ratings
Review scores
Source	Rating
AllMusic	4/5 stars
RapReviews	8.5/10

Resurrection is the third album by the rap group Lords of the Underground, released in 1999.

== Production ==
The album was produced by DJ Lord Jazz and K-Def, among others.

== Critical reception ==
The Plain Dealer wrote: "No cornball skits, no cast-of-thousands posse tracks, just two rappers and a disc jockey doing their thing, and doing it well." The Star-Ledger thought that "the Lords are sample-crazy, lifting everything from Bill Withers' 'Ain't No Sunshine' to Sade's 'Jezebel'."

AllMusic wrote that "Resurrection is strongest when it relies on the classic tenets of hip-hop and its MCs' own talent, instead of grafting the latest trend onto an existing formula."

== Track listing ==
1. "Intro"- 1:47
2. "Retaliate"- 3:44
3. "If You..."- 4:29
4. "Take Dat"- 3:49
5. "Path of the Righteous Man"- :28
6. "Earth, Wind, & Fire" (feat. Joya)- 4:31
7. "Imposter"- 4:14
8. "One Day" (feat. Da Brat)- 4:31
9. "Hennessey, Pt. 1"- :08
10. "Funk for Ya Mama"- 3:08
11. "Haters"- 4:25
12. "Infinite"- 4:20
13. "Blow Your Mind"- :12
14. "Nasty Natti"- 4:18
15. "Hennessey, Pt. 2"- 4:02
16. "Excuse Me"- 5:49
17. "Exodus"- 4:05
