= Faith (Lords of the Underground song) =

Single by Lords of the Underground featuring Deniece Williams

from the album Keepers of the Funk
- B-side: "Neva Faded/What I'm After Remix"
- Released: June 27, 1995
- Recorded: 1994
- Genre: Hip hop
- Length: 4:02
- Label: Pendulum/Capitol
- Songwriter: Lords of the Underground
- Producer: Lords of the Underground

Lords of the Underground singles chronology
| "What I'm After" (1995) | "Faith" (1995) |

Faith is the thrid and final single released from the Lords of the Underground's second album Keepers of the Funk. It released on June the 27th, 1995 through Pendulum and Capitol Records. The song was produced by the Lords of the Underground themselves and features singer Deniece Williams.

The song peaked at 107 on US R&B charts. "Faith" has thus far been the group's final charting single, peaking at 49 on the Hot Rap Singles and 31 on the Dance/Maxi-Singles chart.

== Single track listing ==
=== A-Side ===
1. "Faith" (Radio Version)- 4:02
2. "Faith" (Alternate Mix)- 4:24
3. "Faith" (Original TV track)- 4:03
4. "Faith" (Alternate TV Track)- 4:24

=== B-Side ===
1. "Neva Faded" (Clean Radio Edit)- 5:15
2. "Neva Faded" (Instrumental)- 5:15
3. "What I'm After" (Remix)- 5:09
4. "Faith" (Acapella)- 3:38

== Charts ==
| Chart | Position |
|---|---|
| US R&B Charts | # 107 |
| Hot Rap Singles | # 49 |
| Hot Dance Music/Maxi-Singles Sales | # 31 |
