= Funky Child =

Single by Lords of the Underground

from the album Here Come the Lords
- Released: February 4, 1993
- Recorded: 1992
- Studio: Marley's House of Hits (New York, NY)
- Genre: Hip-hop
- Label: Pendulum
- Songwriters: Al'Terik Wardrick; Dupré Kelly; Marlon Williams
- Producers: Marley Marl; K-Def

Lords of the Underground singles chronology
"Psycho" (1992)	"Funky Child" (1993)	"Chief Rocka" (1993)

Music video
- "Funky Child" on YouTube

"Funky Child" is a song by American hip-hop group Lords of the Underground. It was released in 1992 via Pendulum Records as the second single from the group's debut studio album, Here Come the Lords (1993). Recording sessions took place at Marley's House of Hits in New York. Production was handled by Marley Marl and K-Def. The song peaked at numbers 70 and 74 on the US Cash Box Top 100 and Billboard Hot 100 charts. It also reached number 52 on the Hot R&B/Hip-Hop Songs chart, number two on the Hot Rap Songs chart, number 34 on the Dance Music/Club Play Singles chart and number 20 on the Hot Dance Music/Maxi-Singles Sales chart.

== Track listing ==
No.	Title	Length
1.	"Funky Child" (Extended Mix)
2.	"Funky Child" (Instrumental Mix)
3.	"Funky Child" (Underground Mix)
4.	"Funky Child" (7" Mix)

== Personnel ==
- Al'Terik "Mr. Funke" Wardrick – songwriter
- Dupré "DoItAll" Kelly – songwriter
- Alan Rubin – trumpet
- Marlon "Marley Marl" Williams – songwriter, producer, mixing, executive producer
- Kevin "K-Def" Hansford – producer, mixing
- Frank Heller – mixing, engineering
- George Karras – engineering
- Everett Ramos – engineering
- Ruben Rodriguez – executive producer
- Ron Jaramillo – art direction, design
- Danny Clinch – photography
- Stella Barker – stylist

== Charts ==
Chart (1993)	Peak position
US Billboard Hot 100	74
US Hot R&B/Hip-Hop Songs (Billboard)	52
US Hot Rap Songs (Billboard)	2
US Dance Music/Club Play Singles (Billboard)	34
US Dance Singles Sales (Billboard)	20
US Cash Box Top 100	70
