= Iz U wit Me =

Single by Da Youngsta's

from the album The Aftermath
- Released: July 15, 1993
- Studio: Greene Street Studio (New York City)
- Genre: Hardcore hip hop
- Length: 3:59 (album version); 4:27 (single version)
- Label: East West, Atlantic
- Songwriters: A. Goodman; C. Penn; Peter Phillips; Quran Goodman; Taji Goodman; Tarik Dawson
- Producer: Pete Rock

Da Youngsta's singles chronology
"Crewz Pop" (1993)	"Iz U wit Me" (1993)	"Wild Child" (1993)

Music video
- "Iz U wit Me" on YouTube

"Iz U wit Me" is a song recorded by Da Youngsta's for their 1993 album The Aftermath, and released as a single on July 15, 1993.

The song was produced by Pete Rock. The track contains a diss towards Kris Kross.

== Music video ==
The music video was directed by Treach and James Brummel and was released in 1993. The music video features cameos by Pete Rock, Treach, Apache, and Havoc of Mobb Deep.
