= Keepers of the Funk =

Studio album by Lords of the Underground
- Released: November 1, 1994
- Recorded: 1993–1994
- Studio: House Of Hits (Chesnut Ridge, NY)
- Genre: East Coast hip hop
- Length: 44:49
- Label: Pendulum Records; EMI
- Producer: Ruben Rodriguez (exec.); Marley Marl (also exec.); K-Def; Lords of the Underground

Lords of the Underground chronology
| Here Come the Lords (1993) | Keepers of the Funk (1994) | Resurrection (1999) |

Singles from Keepers of the Funk
- 1. "Tic Toc" Released: October 11, 1994; 2. "What I'm After" Released: February 21, 1995; 3. "Faith" Released: June 27, 1995

Professional ratings
Review scores
| Source | Rating |
|---|---|
| AllMusic | 3/5 stars |
| Rap Pages | 6/10 |
| The Source | 3.5/5 stars |

Keepers of the Funk is the second studio album by American hip hop group Lords of the Underground. It was released on November 1, 1994 via Pendulum Records. Recording sessions took place at House of Hitz in Chestnut Ridge, New York. Production was handled by Marley Marl, K-Def, Lords of the Underground and Andre Booth. It features guest appearances from Sah-B, Deniece Williams, George Clinton, Brian "Bre" Williamson and Supreme C. The album did gain some success, making it to No. 57 on the Billboard 200 and No. 16 on the Top R&B/Hip-Hop Albums chart.

Three singles made it to the Billboard charts: "Tic Toc", "What I'm After" and "Faith".

== Track listing ==
| No. | Title | Writer(s) | Producer(s) | Length |
|---|---|---|---|---|
| 1. | "Intro" | | | 1:00 |
| 2. | "Ready or Not" | Dupré Kelly; Al'Terik Wardrick; Marlon Williams | Marley Marl; Lords of the Underground (co.) | 4:03 |
| 3. | "Tic Toc" | Kelly; Wardrick; Williams; Douglas E. Davis; Ricky Walters | Marley Marl; Lords of the Underground (co.) | 3:51 |
| 4. | "Keepers of the Funk" | Kelly; Wardrick; George Clinton; Williams; Andre Booth | Marley Marl; Lords of the Underground (co.); Andre Booth (co.) | 4:18 |
| 5. | "Steam from da Knot" | Kelly; Kevin Hansford | K-Def; Lords of the Underground (co.) | 3:07 |
| 6. | "What I'm After" | Kelly; Wardrick; Hansford; Emmett Nixon; Robert Reed; Taylor Reed; Tony Fisher; Reginald Noble; J. Stone; Rick James | K-Def; Lords of the Underground (co.) | 4:19 |
| 7. | "Faith" (featuring Deniece Williams) | Kelly; Wardrick; Bruce Colston; Deniece Williams; Hank Redd; Nathan Watts; Susaye Greene | Lords of the Underground | 4:02 |
| 8. | "Neva Faded" (featuring Supreme C) | Kelly; Wardrick; Carle Harte; Brian Williamson; Williams | Marley Marl; Lords of the Underground (co.) | 5:16 |
| 9. | "No Pain" | Wardrick; Hansford; Les McCann | K-Def; Lords of the Underground (co.) | 3:53 |
| 10. | "Frustrated" | Kelly; Wardrick; Hansford | K-Def; Lords of the Underground (co.) | 4:18 |
| 11. | "Yes Y'All" | Kelly; Wardrick; Williams | Marley Marl; Lords of the Underground (co.) | 4:17 |
| 12. | "What U See" | Kelly; Wardrick; Williams | Marley Marl; Lords of the Underground (co.) | 3:57 |
| 13. | "Outro" | | | 1:28 |
| Total length: | | | | 44:49 |

Sample credits

- Track 3 contains a sample of "La Di Da Di" performed by Doug E. Fresh and Slick Rick
- Track 9 features a sample of "Go On And Cry" performed by Les McCann
- Track 10 contains exceperts from "Hamp's Hump" performed by Lou Donaldson

== Personnel ==
- Al'Terik "Mr. Funke" Wardrick – vocals (tracks: 2–4, 6–12), keyboards (track 11), producer (track 7), co-producer (tracks: 2–6, 8–12)
- Dupré "DoItAll" Kelly – vocals (tracks: 2–8, 10–12), producer (track 7), co-producer (tracks: 2–6, 8–12)
- Bruce "DJ Lord Jazz" Colston – scratches (tracks: 2–4, 7–10), producer (track 7), co-producer (tracks: 2–6, 8–12)
- George Clinton & P-Funk Singers – backing vocals (track 4)
- Andre Booth – bass & co-producer (track 4)
- Deniece Williams – vocals (track 7)
- Carle "Supreme C" Harte – vocals (track 8)
- Brian "Bre" Williamson – backing vocals (track 8)
- Frank Heller – bass (track 8), mixing (tracks: 2–5, 7–12)
- Sakinah "Sah-B" Britton – backing vocals (tracks: 9, 10)
- Marlon "Marley Marl" Williams – producer (tracks: 2–4, 8, 11, 12), executive producer
- Kevin "K-Def" Hansford – producer (tracks: 5, 6, 9, 10)
- Herb Powers Jr. – mastering
- Ruben Rodriguez – executive producer
- Nicole Dorward – project coordinator
- Lu Ann Graffeo – art direction
- Diane Cuddy – design
- Christian Cortez – logo design
- Daniel Hastings – photography
- Hafiz Farid – management

== Charts ==
| Chart (1994) | Peak position |
|---|---|
| US Billboard 200 | 57 |
| US Top R&B/Hip-Hop Albums (Billboard) | 16 |
