= Psycho (Lords of the Underground song) =

Single by Lords of the Underground

from the album Here Come the Lords
- B-side: "Check It/Sleep for Dinner"
- Released: August 13, 1992
- Recorded: 1992
- Genre: Hip hop, Hardcore rap
- Length: 4:08
- Label: Pendulum/Elektra
- Songwriter: Lords of the Underground
- Producer: Marley Marl

Lords of the Underground singles chronology
"Psycho" (1992)	"Funky Child" (1993)

"Psycho" is the first single released from the Lords of the Underground's debut album, Here Come the Lords. Produced by Marley Marl with scratches by DJ Lord Jazz, "Psycho" became a minor hit, peaking at 17 on the Hot Rap Singles.

The song was recorded and mixed at Marley Marl's production studio, Marley's House of Hits, and was mastered at the legendary studio, The Hit Factory.

== Single track listing ==
=== A-Side ===
1. "Psycho" (12" Rubber Room Mix) – 4:08
2. "Psycho" (Asylum Dub) – 4:08
3. "Psycho" (Radio Mix) – 3:59

=== B-Side ===
1. "Sleep for Dinner" (LP Mix) – 4:30
2. "Check It" (LP Mix) – 3:35
3. "Psycho" (Instrumental) – 4:08

== Charts ==
Chart	Position
Hot Rap Singles	# 17
Hot Dance Music/Maxi-Singles Sales	# 30
