= I'll Make U Famous =

Studio album by Illy Funkstaz
- Released: October 24, 1995
- Recorded: 1994–1995
- Studio: Basement Beatz Studios (St. Louis); Destro Studios (Philadelphia, Pennsylvania)
- Genre: Hip hop
- Length: 56:21
- Label: Pop Art
- Producer: Qu'ran "Q-Ball" Goodman, Emmanuel "M.G." Parks, Dante "Destro" Barton

Illy Funkstaz chronology
No Mercy (1994)	I'll Make U Famous (1995)

Singles from I'll Make U Famous
- 1. "I'll Make U Famous" Released: September 1995; 2. "Verbal Glock" Released: February 1996

Professional ratings
Review scores
Source	Rating
MusicHound	1.5/5 stars
The Source	3/5 stars

I'll Make U Famous is the fourth album by the American rap group Da Youngsta's. In this album they referred to themselves as Illy Funkstaz.

== Track listing ==
1. "I'll Make U Famous" – 4:03
2. "Bloodshed and War" (featuring Mobb Deep) (produced by Quran Goodman) – 5:00
3. "Everyman 4 Theyself" – 4:34
4. "Gotta Get da Cheese" – 4:08
5. "U R Everything" – 3:54
6. "Bad 2 da Bone" – 4:54
7. "Verbal Glock" – 3:57
8. "24 Hrs. 2 Live" – 5:17
9. "Incredible" featuring Big Tabb and Mentally Gifted (M.G) – 3:57
10. "Murda" – 3:31
11. "If I Had a Million" – 3:39
12. "I'll Make U Famous" (Remix) – 4:04
13. "Bloodshed and War" (featuring Mobb Deep) (Remix) – 5:27
