= Somethin 4 Da Youngsta's =

Studio album by Da Youngsta's
- Released: March 10, 1992
- Recorded: 1991–1992
- Genre: Hip hop
- Label: East West, Atlantic
- Producer: L.G. the Teacher

Da Youngsta's chronology
Somethin 4 Da Youngsta's (1992)	The Aftermath (1993)

Singles from Somethin 4 Da Youngsta's
- 1. "Somethin 4 Da Youngsta's" Released: 1991; 2. "Pass Da Mic" Released: June 25, 1992

Professional ratings
Review scores
Source	Rating
AllMusic	2/5 stars
MusicHound	2.5/5 stars
RapReviews	6.5/10

Somethin 4 Da Youngsta's is the debut album by the American hip hop trio Da Youngsta's. It was released on March 10, 1992 by East West. the album was produced by L.G. the Teacher, father of Da Youngsta's members Quran and Taji Goodman. Its release was accompanied by two singles, "Somethin 4 Da Youngsta's" and "Pass Da Mic". The latter peaked at number 10 on the Hot Rap Singles chart, but the album itself failed to chart.

== Commercial performance ==
Somethin 4 Da Youngsta's failed to make an impact on the charts both album wise and single wise. The album/single was overshadowed by another teen-rap group Kris Kross, whose single Jump blew up over night. They found luck with their 2nd single Pass Da Mic remixed by Pete Rock and released in the summer of 1992. The single hit #10 on the Hot Rap Singles and hit 3rd most watched video on The Box.

== Track listing ==
* All songs written and produced by L.G Goodman and Emanuel Parks except "Reminiss" and "Street Smart" and "Tuff Cookie" written by Tarik Dawson

1. "Somethin 4 Da Youngsta's" (E.Parks, L.Goodman)
2. "Street Smart" (E.Parks, L. Goodman, T. Dawson)
3. "Rated P.G." (E.Parks, L. Goodman)
4. "Cartoons" (E.Parks, L. Goodman)
5. "Tuff Cookie" (E.Parks, L. Goodman, T.Dawson)
6. "Y-Ya-Tryin' to Play Me" (E.Parks, L. Goodman)
7. "I Didn't Mean 2 Break Your Heart" ( D. Marshall E. Parks T. Nelson T. Weldon)
8. "Reminiss" (E.Parks, L. Goodman)
9. "Neighborhood Bully" (E.Parks, L. Goodman)
10. "Pass Da Mic" (E.Parks, L. Goodman)
11. "Somethin 4 Da Youngsta's" (Remix) (E.Parks, L. Goodman)
