= Ponderosa Twins Plus One =

American soul vocal group

- Origin: Cleveland, Ohio, U.S.
- Genres: R&B, soul, funk, vocal
- Years active: 1970–1975
- Labels: Astroscope, Horoscope
- Past members: Alfred Pelham (deceased); Alvin Pelham (deceased); Keith Gardner; Kirk Gardner (incarcerated); Ricky Spicer

Ponderosa Twins Plus One was an American soul vocal group formed in 1970 in Cleveland, Ohio. The group featured two sets of identical twins, Alfred and Alvin Pelham, and Keith and Kirk Gardner, along with Ricky Spicer. The group released one studio album, 2 + 2 + 1 = Ponderosa Twins Plus One, in 1971, before disbanding in 1975.

The group came into prominence after their track, "Bound" was sampled by rapper Kanye West in his 2013 song, "Bound 2". This was followed by a copyright lawsuit by Ricky Spicer. "Bound" was also sampled by rapper Tyler, the Creator in his 2019 song "A Boy Is a Gun".

== History ==
The group was founded in 1969 while the original members attended the Patrick Henry Jr. High School on the east side of Cleveland. The group was managed by Tony Wilson, who brought them to the attention of Bobby Massey of the O'Jays. Through Massey, the group eventually signed to Chuck Brown's Astroscope record label.

Accompanied by Massey, the group recorded three singles in a studio. Sylvia Robinson, the owner of All Platinum Records, agreed to distribute singles. The group's first single, "You Send Me" became their best-selling single, peaking at number 23 at Billboard's Best Selling Soul Singles. Following the success of the single, the group toured with artists such as the Moments, the Whatnauts, Linda Jones and Lonnie Youngblood.

In 1971, the group released their only album, 2 + 2 + 1 = Ponderosa Twins Plus One. "Bound" became their second single and peaked at number 47 on Best Selling Soul Singles chart. The second single off the album, a cover of Frankie Lymon's "Why Do Fools Fall in Love", was also released in 1971. It was produced by Calvin Simon of Parliament and Funkadelic.

Due to the lack of royalties and earnings from live shows, the group disbanded in 1975. Following the disestablishment of the act, the Pelham twins have since died and both Gardner twins are in prisons.

Kirk Gardner has been incarcerated at Belmont Correctional Institution since June 9, 1980 for receiving stolen property, felony assault, rape, kidnapping and aggravated murder. He is doing 28 years to life. Keith Gardner was sentenced to 25 years in 1977 for murder, was released in 2007 but charged in 2010 for attempted murder and robbery, after shooting at a man. He was sentenced to nine years in January 2011.

Ricky Spicer became a construction worker in the greater Cleveland area and maintained a friendship with the Gardners.

== Lawsuits ==
In 2013, Ricky Spicer filed a lawsuit against rapper Kanye West, as well as Roc-A-Fella Records, the Island Def Jam Music Group, Rhino Entertainment and Universal Music Group, citing copyright infringement in West's track, "Bound 2", from his 2013 album, Yeezus. Spicer alleged that West didn't ask his permission to use the sample and it was audible in the record, seeking an injunction and damages for alleged violations. In 2015, Ricky Spicer's attorney, Brittany Weiner from the law firm Imbesi Law P.C. confirmed that both parties had entered into a confidential settlement agreement and that the case was resolved.

In 2014, Spicer sued Vogue magazine and its publisher Condé Nast, after "Bound 2" was used in the promotional behind the scenes video for the magazine's April edition cover, which featured Kanye West and Kim Kardashian.

== Members ==
- Alvin Pelham, born May 28, 1958 – died December 23, 2012
- Alfred Pelham, born May 28, 1958 — died July 15, 2009 in Lancaster, New York
- Keith Gardner, born February 18, 1958
- Kirk Gardner, born February 18, 1958
- Ricky Spicer, born 1957

== Discography ==
Studio albums

- 2 + 2 + 1 = Ponderosa Twins Plus One (1971)

Singles

- "You Send Me" (1971)
- "Bound" (1971)
- "Why Do Fools Fall in Love/Bitter with the Sweet" (1971)
