= Crewz Pop =

1993 single by Da Youngsta's featuring Treach

Single by Da Youngsta's featuring Treach

from the album The Aftermath
- Released: March 11, 1993
- Studio: Unique Studios (New York City)
- Genre: Hip hop
- Length: 2:57
- Label: East West; Atlantic
- Songwriter: 118th Street Productions
- Producer: 118th Street Productions

Da Youngsta's singles chronology
"Pass Da Mic" (1992)	"Crewz Pop" (1993)	"Iz U wit Me" (1993)

Treach singles chronology
"Crewz Pop" (1993)	"Throw Your Hands Up" (1995)

Music video
- "Crewz Pop" on YouTube

"Crewz Pop" is a song by American rap group Da Youngsta's featuring rapper Treach of the hip hop group Naughty by Nature. The song was released on March 11, 1993, as the first single from their second studio album, The Aftermath.

== Charts ==
Chart (1993)	Peak position
US Hot R&B/Hip-Hop Songs (Billboard)	59
