= K-Def =

American record producer

K-Def (full name Kevin Hansford) (born June 17, 1970) is an American, New Jersey–based, hip hop producer/DJ who has been actively involved in the music industry since the early 1990s. He has recently produced music for artists such as Ghostface Killah and Puff Daddy. K-Def earned critical praise early in his career for his work with Marley Marl on the album Here Come the Lords by the hip hop group Lords of the Underground. Among the songs from that album that benefited from K-Def's production work include the hits "Funky Child" and "Chief Rocka".

== Biography ==
K-Def was also a member of the duo Real Live, which released one album The Turnaround: A Long Awaited Drama on Big Beat/Atlantic Records in 1996. "Real Live Shit (Remix)" featured Cappadonna, Ghostface Killah, Killa Sin and Lord Tariq. In April 2018, Rhino Entertainment issued a digital download of the album.

K-Def is mostly known for his blues-soul sampling style. While the majority of his early-mid 1990s productions were produced using the Akai MPC sampler/sequencer, around 1997 he started incorporating computers into his work flow and now exclusively uses a software based setup.

In 2004 K-Def produced "Its Over" on the Ghostface Killah release The Pretty Toney Album. He then contributed tracks to another Ghostface project, Theodore Unit, and Ol' Dirty Bastard's The Osirus Mixtape. He was a contributor to Diddy's 2006 release Press Play, and, in 2007, he produced a track on UGK's album Underground Kingz.

In 2006, K-Def released an instrumental album called Willie Boo Boo The Fool. The album was originally only available on CD and vinyl, but it was digitally re-released in 2008.

In 2008, K-Def released a collaborative EP with the rapper Dacapo under the name the Program, which was titled The Article.

== Discography ==
=== Albums ===
- The Turnaround: A Long Awaited Drama (1996), (with Larry-O as Real Live)
- Willie Boo Boo The Fool (2006)
- The Article EP (2008), (with DaCapo as The Program)
- Beats From The 90's Vol. 1 (2008)
- Beats From The 90's Vol. 2 (2009)
- Gangster Instrumentals (2010)
- Night Shift (2011)
- One Man Band (2013)
- The Exhibit (2013)
- The Meeting EP (2013)

=== Production ===
- AZ - Doe or Die III - "The Origin (Intro)" - (Mass Appeal Records, 2026)
- KRS-One & Marley Marl – Hip Hop Lives - "The Teacha" - (Koch, 2007)
- Diddy - Press Play – "We Gon Make It" - (Bad Boy/Atlantic, 2006)
- El Da Sensei – The Unusual – "Rock It Out" (Fat Beats, 2006)
- Ol' Dirty Bastard – Osirus – "Rock It Out" - (Sure Shot, 2005)
  - "Who Can Make It Happen Like Dirt"
  - "High In The Clouds"
  - "Pussy Keep Calling"
  - "Fuck Y'all"
- Theodore Unit – 718 – (Sure Shot, 2005)
  - "Paychecks"
  - "Wicked With Lead"
  - "Pass The Mike"
- Ghostface Killah – The Pretty Toney Album – "It's Over"; "Last Night" (uncredited) – (Def Jam/IDJMG/Universal, 2004)
- Jayo Felony – Crip Hop - "True'd Up" +/ (Remix) (Loco/Motown?, 2002)
- Craig Mack – Please Listen To My Demo (barely released, 2001)
- Lord Tariq – This Cold World (N.a, 2000)
- Lords of the Underground – Resurrection – "If You..." (Jersey Kidz Records, 1999)
- Artifacts – It's Gettin Hot (Remix) – (Big Beat/Atlantic, 1997)
- Mic Geronimo – Vendetta – "For tha Family" – (TVT, 1997)
- Real Live - The Turnaround: A Long Awaited Drama - [almost] whole album - (Big Beat, 1996)
- Nonchalant – "5 O'Clock (Remix) – (MCA, 1996)
- World Renown – Come Take a Ride (WC Vibe) – (Warner Bros., 1994)
- A.D.O.R. – The Concrete - "One for the Trouble" – (Atlantic, 1994)
- Da Youngsta's – No Mercy (East West America/Atlantic, 1994)
  - "Mad Props"
  - "Backstabbers"
  - "Stayed Away"
  - "Illy Philly Funk"
  - "Reality"
- Sah-B - Some Od' Sah-B Shit (unreleased) – (Reprise/Warner Bros., 1994)
- Lords of the Underground – Keepers of the Funk – (Pendulum/EMI, 1994)
  - "Steam From the Knot"
  - "What I'm After"
  - "No Pain"
  - "Frustrated"
  - "What I'm After" (Rumble Remix)
- Lords of the Underground – Here Come the Lords – (Pendulum/Elektra, 1993)
  - "Here Come the Lords"
    - "From the Bricks"
    - "Funky Child"
    - "Mad Skillz"
    - "Lord's Prayer"
    - "LOTUG"
    - "Lord Jazz Hit Me One Time"
    - Chief Rocka"
- Shabba Ranks - Ting A Ling (Rough & Ready Mix) - Rough & Ready Volume 2 (Epic/SME, 1993)
- Positive K - Ain't No Crime (K-Def DL Mix) – (Island/PolyGram, 1993)
- Tragedy Khadafi - Street Life:: Return of the Life (Remix) – (Tuff Break/A&M/PolyGram, 1993)
- Tragedy Khadafi – Tragedy: Saga of a Hoodlum – (Tuff Break/A&M/PolyGram, 1993)
  - "Shalom A Leck"
  - "At Large"
  - "Death Row"
  - "Pass The Teck"
  - "Uunderground"
  - "Funkmode"
  - "Grand Groove"
  - "Mad Brothas Know His Name"
- Monie Love - In a Word or 2 – (Warner Bros., 1993)
  - "There's a Better Way"
  - "For da Children"
