= Here Come the Lords =

Studio album by Lords of the Underground
- Released: March 30, 1993
- Recorded: June 1992 – February 1993
- Genres: East Coast hip hop; hardcore hip hop
- Length: 63:10
- Labels: Pendulum; Elektra
- Producers: Marley Marl; K-Def

Lords of the Underground chronology
Here Come the Lords (1993)	Keepers of the Funk (1994)

Singles from Here Come the Lords
- 1. "Psycho" Released: August 13, 1992; 2. "Funky Child" Released: February 4, 1993; 3. "Chief Rocka" Released: June 3, 1993; 4. "Flow On" Released: April 26, 1994

Here Come the Lords is the debut studio album by American hip hop group Lords of the Underground. It was released in 1993 by Pendulum and Elektra Records. It was produced by Marley Marl and K-Def.

The album peaked at No. 66 on the Billboard 200 and No. 13 on the Top R&B/Hip-Hop Albums chart. Five singles charted, "Chief Rocka," "Here Come the Lords," "Funky Child," "Flow On," and "Psycho".

== Critical reception ==
Professional ratings
Review scores
Source	Rating
AllMusic	4/5 stars
The Encyclopedia of Popular Music	3/5 stars
The Source	3.5/5 stars

Trouser Press wrote: "Smoothly entertaining, loaded with diverting references, nearly wholesome and just loopy enough to make a lasting impression, Here Come the Lords walks a cagey line between straight-up hardcore and a slightly removed pop version of it." The Washington Post noted "the often-hyper vocals—which sometimes sound like annoying, high pitched yelling" and "tired, formulaic, saxophone and drum samples."

Spin called the album "one of the most consistent East Coast rap records from a year of boom-bap abundance."

== Track listing ==
All tracks written by Al'Terik Wardrick, Dupré Kelly, and Marlon Williams (except track 14). Tracks 1, 2, 3, 9, 11, 13, and 14 are also written by K-Def. All tracks produced by Marley Marl except 1, 2, 11, 13, 14 produced by K-Def and 3 and 9 produced by Marley Marl and K-Def. Track 7 co-produced by K-Def

No.	Title	Length
1.	"Here Come the Lords"	4:18
2.	"From da Bricks" (with Jam-C)	4:20
3.	"Funky Child"	4:31
4.	"Keep It Underground"	4:08
5.	"Check It (Remix)"	4:24
6.	"Grave Digga"	4:06
7.	"Lords Prayer"	4:30
8.	"Flow On (New Symphony)" (with Kid Deleon and Sah-B)	4:25
9.	"Madd Skillz"	5:03
10.	"Psycho"	4:08
11.	"Chief Rocka"	4:07
12.	"Sleep for Dinner (Remix)"	5:16
13.	"L.O.T.U.G. (Lords of the Underground)"	4:26
14.	"Lord Jazz Hit Me One Time (Make It Funky)"	2:46
15.	"What's Goin' On (*Bonus)"	3:38
Total length:		62:06

== Charts ==
=== Weekly charts ===
Chart (1993)	Peak position
US Billboard 200	66
US Top R&B/Hip-Hop Albums (Billboard)	13

=== Year-end charts ===
Chart (1993)	Position
US Top R&B/Hip-Hop Albums (Billboard)	55
