= Flow On =

Single by Lords of the Underground featuring Kid Deleon and Sah-B

from the album Here Come the Lords
- B-side: "Lord's Prayer"
- Released: April 26, 1994
- Recorded: 1993
- Genre: Hip hop
- Length: 4:25
- Label: Pendulum/Elektra
- Songwriter(s): Lords of the Underground
- Producer(s): Marley Marl

Lords of the Underground singles chronology
| "Here Come the Lords" (1993) | "Flow On" (1994) | "Tic Toc" (1994) |

"Flow On (New Symphony)" is the fifth and final single released from the Lords of the Underground's debut album, Here Come the Lords. The original song was produced by Marley Marl and featured verses from the group's affiliates, Kid Deleon and Sah-B, while Pete Rock contributed a remix of the song. "Flow On" peaked at 36 on the Hot Rap Singles and sampled "Float On" by The Floaters.

== Single track listing ==
=== A-Side ===
1. "Flow On (New Symphony)" (Pete Rock Remix)- 4:28
2. "Flow On (New Symphony)" (Pete Rock TV Mix)- 4:28
3. "Flow On (New Symphony)" (Flo-apella)- 4:28

=== B-Side ===
1. "Lord's Prayer" (Album Mix)- 4:30
2. "Flow On (New Symphony)" (Rumblin' Remix)- 4:08
3. "Flow On (New Symphony)" (Rumblin' TV Mix)- 4:08
4. "Flow On (New Symphony)" (Rumbapella)- 4:01

== Charts ==
| Chart | Position |
|---|---|
| Hot Rap Singles | # 36 |
| Hot Dance Music/Maxi-Singles Sales | # 8 |
