= That's Them =

Studio album by Artifacts
- Released: April 15, 1997
- Studio: Platinum Island Studios (New York, NY); Unique Recording Studios (New York, NY); Master Cutting Room (New York, NY)
- Genre: Hip-hop
- Length: 59:31
- Label: Big Beat; Atlantic
- Producer: Baby Paul; Gruff Rhino; Lord Finesse; Mr. Walt; Rob "Reef" Tewlow; Shawn J. Period; V.I.C.

Artifacts chronology
Between a Rock and a Hard Place (1994)	That's Them (1997)	No Expiration Date (2022)

Singles from That's Them
- 1. "Art of Facts" Released: August 27, 1996; 2. "The Ultimate" Released: March 4, 1997

Professional ratings
Review scores
Source	Rating
AllMusic	3/5 stars
RapReviews	8.5/10

That's Them is the second studio album by American hip-hop duo Artifacts. It was released on April 15, 1997, via Big Beat/Atlantic Records. The recording sessions took place at Platinum Island Studios, Unique Recording and Master Cutting Room in New York. The album was produced by Shawn J Period, Baby Paul, V.I.C., Gruff Rhino, Lord Finesse, Mr. Walt, and Rob "Reef" Tewlow, with co-producer Tame One and additional producer Showbiz. It features guest appearances from Lord Finesse and Lord Jamar.

The album debuted at number 134 on the Billboard 200, number 25 on the Top R&B Albums and number 3 on the Heatseekers Albums in the United States. It was supported with two singles: "Art of Facts" and "The Ultimate".

== Track listing ==
No.	Title	Writer(s)	Producer(s)	Length
1.	"Art of Scratch" (Intro)		Rob "Reef" Tewlow	1:14
2.	"Art of Facts"	Rahem Ross Brown; William E. Williams; Shawn M. Jones	Shawn J Period	4:23
3.	"31 Bumrush"	Brown; Williams; Jones	Shawn J Period	3:42
4.	"To Ya Chest"	Brown; Williams; Jones	Shawn J Period	3:20
5.	"Where Yo Skillz At?"	Brown; Williams; Jones	Shawn J Period	4:30
6.	"Collaboration of Mics" (featuring Lord Finesse and Lord Jamar)	Brown; Williams; Robert Hall; Lorenzo Dechalus	Lord Finesse	4:20
7.	"The Ultimate"	Brown; Williams; Paul Anthony Hendricks; Paul L. Blaize; Sean Williamson; Steven Workman	Baby Paul	4:42
8.	"It's Gettin' Hot"	Brown; Williams; Walter Dewgarde	Mr. Walt	4:07
9.	"This Is da Way"	Brown; Williams; Victor Padilla	V.I.C.	3:47
10.	"The Interview"	Brown; Williams; Padilla	V.I.C.	3:39
11.	"Break It Down"	Brown; Williams; Jones	Shawn J Period	4:01
12.	"Skwad Training"	Brown; Williams; Hendricks	Baby Paul	4:30
13.	"Ingredients to Time Travel"	Brown	Gruff Rhino; Tame One (co.)	3:38
14.	"Return to da Wrongside"	Brown; Williams; Jones; Benjamin Maupin	Shawn J Period	4:30
15.	"Who's This?"	Brown; Williams; Jones	Shawn J Period	4:39
16.	"The Ultimate" (Showbiz Remix)	Brown; Williams; Hendricks; Rodney LeMay; Blaize; Williamson; Workman	Showbiz (add.)	4:25
Total length:				59:31

Sample credits

- Track 5 contains elements from "Izzum Man" performed by Diesel Don & The Governer.
- Track 9 contains elements from "Rock the House" written by Russell Simmons and Joseph Simmons and performed by Run-DMC.
- Tracks 11 and 13 contain material performed by Redman.
- Track 14 contains elements from "Winds of Change" performed by Bennie Maupin.

== Personnel ==
- Rahem Ross "Tame One" Brown – vocals, co-producer (track 13)
- William E. "El Da Sensei" Williams – vocals
- Robert "Lord Finesse" Hall Jr. – vocals & producer (track 6)
- Lorenzo "Lord Jamar" DeChalus – vocals (track 6)
- Shawn "DJ Kaos" Perry – scratches (tracks: 1, 2, 4, 6, 8–10, 12, 15, 16)
- Andrew "Dr. Butcher" Venable – scratches (track 5)
- Michael "DJ Mike Loe" Warren – scratches (track 6)
- Anthony "Tone The Backbone" Scott – bass (track 8)
- Rob "Reef" Tewlow – producer (track 1), executive producer, A&R
- Shawn M. "Shawn J Period" Jones – producer (tracks: 2–5, 11, 14, 15)
- Paul "Baby Paul" Hendricks – producer (tracks: 7, 12)
- Walter "Mr. Walt" Dewgarde – producer (track 8)
- Victor "V.I.C." Padilla – producer (tracks: 9, 10)
- Kirkland Rick "Gruff Rhino" Ward – producer (track 13)
- Rodney "Showbiz" LeMay – additional producer & re-mixing (track 16)
- Josh Chervokas – recording (tracks: 1, 16), mixing (track 1)
- Ken "Duro" Ifill – recording (tracks: 2–12, 14, 15), mixing (tracks: 2–8, 11, 12, 14, 15)
- Troy Hightower – mixing (tracks: 9, 10)
- DJ Nastee – recording (track 15)
- "Commissioner" Gordon Williams – mixing (track 16)
- Bill Importico – engineering assistant
- Paul Shatraw – engineering assistant
- Vaughn Sessions – engineering assistant
- Tom Coyne – mastering
- Courtney Burgess – executive producer
- Eric Altenburger – art direction, design
- Christian Lantry – photography

== Charts ==
Chart (1997)	Peak position
US Billboard 200	134
US Top R&B/Hip-Hop Albums (Billboard)	25
US Heatseekers Albums (Billboard)	3
