= El Da Sensei =

- Born: William E. Williams; January 7, 1971 (age 55)
- Origin: Newark, New Jersey, U.S.
- Genres: Hip-hop, rap, hardcore rap
- Occupation: Rapper
- Years active: 1987-present
- Labels: Fat Beats, Asfalt Records, Coalmine

William E. Williams, also known as El Da Sensei, is an American rapper from Newark, New Jersey. During the 1990s he was a member of the hip-hop duo, Artifacts.

Since then he has released several solo albums.

In 2015, at The 14th Annual Independent Music Awards, "The Immortals Project Featuring El Da Sensei" won the award in the "Rap/Hip-Hop - Song" category for "On the Rise".

== Discography ==
=== With Artifacts ===
- 1994: Between a Rock and a Hard Place
- 1997: That's Them

=== Solo ===
- 2003: Relax, Relate, Release (Seven Heads)
- 2006: The Unusual (Fat Beats)
- 2008: Unheard Of
- 2008: Global Takeover: The Beginning (with Polish hip-hop duo The Returners (Little & DJ Chwiał))
- 2009: The Money EP (with The Returners)
- 2009: Shining Shadow Presents... The Immortals Project
- 2010: GT2: Nu World (with The Returners)
- 2011: The Nu World Remix EP
- 2013: The Immortals Project Feat. El Da Sensei - Rogue Agents (Shining Shadow)
- 2017: We Bring It Live 1/3 of the 'n Chillow series (with Chillowproductions)
- 2018: XL (with Sadat X)
- 2021 Solving Cases (with Jake Palumbo)
