= Chief Rocka =

Single by Lords of the Underground

from the album Here Come the Lords
- Released: June 3, 1993
- Recorded: 1992
- Genre: Boom bap
- Length: 4:07
- Label: Pendulum; Elektra
- Songwriters: Al'Terik Wardrick, Dupré Kelly, Kevin Hansford, Marlon Williams
- Producer: K-Def

Lords of the Underground singles chronology
"Funky Child" (1993)	"Chief Rocka" (1993)	"Here Come the Lords" (1993)

Music video
- "Chief Rocka" on YouTube

"Chief Rocka" is a song by the American hip-hop group Lords of the Underground, released in June 1993 by Pendulum and Elektra Records, as the third single from their debut album, Here Come the Lords (1993). The song was produced and featured scratches by K-Def, with K-Def and Marley Marl mixing it. "Chief Rocka" became the group's most successful single and has become their signature song. It peaked at numbers 55 and 61 on the US Billboard Hot 100 and Cash Box Top 100 charts, the group's highest appearance on these charts, and went to number one on the Billboard Hot Rap Singles chart. The song has been sampled several times, including on The Notorious B.I.G.'s song "Machine Gun Funk" from his 1994 album Ready to Die, and on Kanye West's "Guilt Trip" from his 2013 album Yeezus, which contains an interpolation of "Chief Rocka" chorus.

== Single track listing ==
=== A-Side ===
1. "Chief Rocka" (Rumblin' Mix) – 4:07
2. "Chief Rocka" (Instrumental) – 4:07
3. "Chief Rocka" (Beat-A-Pella) – 4:04

=== B-Side ===
1. "Chief Rocka" (Jazzy Underground Mix) – 4:04
2. "Chief Rocka" (Video Version) – 4:07
3. "Chief Rocka" (Mixshow DJ Mix) – 4:04

== Personnel ==
Credits are adapted from the album's liner notes.

- K-Def, Marley Marl – mixing
- Tom Coyne – mastering
- Frank Heller – engineer
- Ron Jaramillo – artwork
- Michael Benabib – photography

== Charts ==
Chart (1993)	Peak position
US Billboard Hot 100	55
US Hot R&B/Hip-Hop Songs	35
US Hot Rap Singles	1
US Hot Dance Music/Maxi-Singles Sales	10
US Cash Box Top 100	61
