= No Mercy (Da Youngsta's album) =

Studio album by Da Youngsta's
- Released: September 20, 1994
- Recorded: 1993–1994
- Studio: House Of Hitz, Inc. Chestnut Ridge, New York
- Genre: Hip hop
- Length: 53:13
- Label: East West; Atlantic
- Producer: Lawrence Goodman (exec.); Ann Goodman (exec.); Marley Marl (also exec.); K-Def; Qur'an Goodman; Dante "Destro" Barton

Da Youngsta's chronology
The Aftermath (1993)	No Mercy (1994)	I'll Make U Famous (1995)

Singles from No Mercy
- 1. "Hip Hop Ride" Released: August 1994; 2. "Mad Props" Released: 1995

Professional ratings
Review scores
Source	Rating
AllMusic	4.5/5 stars
MusicHound	2/5 stars
The Source	3/5 stars

No Mercy is the third studio album by the American rap group Da Youngsta's. It was released on September 20, 1994, by EastWest. The album peaked at number 45 on the Billboard Top R&B/Hip-Hop Albums chart.

== Track listing ==
1. "Hip Hop Ride" (Q. Goodman, T. Goodman, T. Dawson, C. Harte) (4:19)
2. "Mad Props" (Q. Goodman, T. Goodman, T. Dawson, C. Harte) (4:15)
3. "No Mercy" (Q. Goodman, T. Goodman, A. Goodman, T. Dawson, C. Harte) (4:26)
4. "Backstabbers" (Q. Goodman, T. Goodman, A. Goodman, T. Dawson, C. Harte) (3:53)
5. "No More Hard Times" (Q. Goodman, T. Goodman, A. Goodman, T. Dawson, C. Harte) (4:10)
6. "Put Me On" (Q. Goodman, T. Goodman, A. Goodman, T. Dawson, A. Goodman) (4:29)
7. "Stayed Away" (Q. Goodman, T. Goodman, A. Goodman, T. Dawson, A. Ross, L. Ware) (3:58)
8. "Illy Filly Funk" (A. Goodman) (4:19)
9. "Grim Reaper" (Q. Goodman, T. Goodman, T. Dawson, W. Robinson, White) (4:05)
10. "Reality" (Q. Goodman, A. Goodman, C. Woods, G. Grice, J. Hunter, L. Hawkins, R. Jones) (4:12)
11. "In the City" (Q. Goodman, T. Goodman, T. Dawson, D. Barton) (3:35)
12. "People Round Town" (Q. Goodman, T. Goodman, T. Dawson, D. Barton) (3:50)
13. "What U Feel" (D. Anderson, R. Myrick, R. Bailey) (3:40)

== Personnel ==
- Pete Rock - scratches
- Marley Marl - recording, mixing, executive producer
- K-Def - mixing
- Frank Heller - mixing
- Carlton Batts - mastering
- Lawrence Goodman - executive producer
- Ann Goodman - executive producer
- Michael Miller - photography
- Sung-Lee Crawforth - art direction & design
