= 2 + 2 + 1 = Ponderosa Twins Plus One =

Studio album by Ponderosa Twins Plus One
- Released: 1971
- Studio: Agency (Cleveland)
- Genre: Soul, R&B, funk
- Length: 36:28
- Label: Horoscope
- Producer: Bobby Massey, Michael Burton

Singles from 2 + 2 + 1 = Ponderosa Twins Plus One
- 1. "You Send Me" Released: 1971; 2. "Bound" Released: 1971

2 + 2 + 1 = Ponderosa Twins Plus One is the only album by American vocal group Ponderosa Twins Plus One, released in 1971 through Horoscope Records. The album was produced by Bobby Massey of the O'Jays and Michael Burton, a songwriter and producer of All Platinum Records.

The album spawned two singles, a cover of Sam Cooke's "You Send Me", and "Bound". "You Send Me" became the band's most successful single release, and both songs charted on Billboard's Best Selling Soul Singles. The track "Bound" was sampled by Kanye West in his 2013 song, "Bound 2". This was followed by a set of copyright infringement lawsuits by the ex-Ponderosa Twins Plus One member Ricky Spicer, directed at West and related parties. The same track was sampled in 2019 by Tyler, the Creator’s "A Boy Is a Gun", for which Bobby Massey received sample credits on.

The album was reissued on vinyl in Japan by P-Vine Records in 1990. After West's sampling led to resurged interest in the group, the album was reissued again in 2013 and 2022.

== Critical reception ==
Professional ratings
Review scores
Source	Rating
AllMusic	3/5 stars

AllMusic reviewer Andrew Hamilton compared the production work of Bobby Massey and Michael Burton, stating that "Massey's sides were the most interesting"; "He knew how to record them, Burton saddled them with a tinny, kiddie sound, and a couple of his productions/compositions are far too strident for ears." Hamilton also noted "You Send Me," "Bound," "I Remember You," and "Dad I Love Her" as "album highlights."

== Track listing ==
1. "Love You While You Wait" (Burton)
2. "Hey Girl" (Chuck Brown, Bobby Dukes)
3. "Turn Around You Fool" (Burton)
4. "Touchdown" (Dukes, Massey)
5. "That's What I'll Do" (Burton)
6. "Bound" (Dukes, Massey)
7. "You Send Me" (Sam Cooke)
8. "Take Me Back" (Burton)
9. "Like The Big Boys" (Brown)
10. "Dad, I Love Her" (Burton)
11. "I Remember You" (Dukes, Massey, Hamilton)
12. "Mama's Little Baby" (Burton)

== Personnel ==
Ponderosa Twins Plus One

- Alfred Pelham
- Alvin Pelham
- Keith Gardner
- Kirk Gardner
- Ricky Spicer

Technical personnel

- Bobby Massey - production
- Michael Burton - arrangement

== Charts positions ==
Singles

Year	Song	Chart	Peak position
1971	"You Send Me"	Billboard Best Selling Soul Singles	23
1971	"Bound"	Billboard Best Selling Soul Singles	47
