= Da Youngsta's =

American hip hop group

Da Youngsta’s
- Also known as: Illy Funkstaz
- Origin: Philadelphia, Pennsylvania, U.S.
- Genres: Hip hop; hardcore hip hop
- Years active: 1991–1997; 2018–present
- Labels: Pop Art; East West America; Atlantic
- Members: Taji Goodman; Quran Goodman; Tarik Dawson
- Website: www.dayoungstas.com

Da Youngsta's is an American rap group from Philadelphia, Pennsylvania, United States, that consisted of brothers Taji "Taj Mahal" Goodman (born February 23, 1977) and Qu'ran "Q-Ball" Goodman (March 24, 1978), and their cousin Tarik "Reek Geez" Dawson (February 22, 1976).

The group released four albums in four years, experiencing its greatest success with 1993's The Aftermath.

The group started in 1991 by Q-Ball's dad when Q-Ball was asked to rap a verse for "Somethin' 4 Da Youth" By "M.G." His dad liked his flow, so he called Taji to rap the second verse and they called their cousin Tarik and they formed the group in 1991. Their first album Somethin 4 Da Youngsta's, failed to make the charts, but their second single "Pass Da Mic" made it to Number 10.

In 1993 their second album, The Aftermath, made it to Number 25 On Rap / R&B Charts with three singles, "Crewz Pop", "Iz U Wit Me" and "Wild Child". "Crewz Pop" made it to Number 3 on The Hot Rap Singles and "Iz U Wit Me" made It to Number 9, In 1994.

The group dropped their third album No Mercy in 1994. The album made it to Number 45. It had two singles, "Hip Hop Ride" and "Mad Props". "Hip Hop Ride" peaked at Number 21, and “Mad Props” made it to Number 19.

In 1995 they dropped their last album I'll Make U Famous. This was the group's first album after being dropped by the record label, but the album failed to make it to the charts. The album spawned two singles, "I'll Make U Famous" And "Verbal Glock". "I'll Make U Famous" made it to Number 25. The group released their last album, "Icons" in 1997, before they split up in 1998.

== Discography ==
=== Albums ===
Year	Title	Chart positions		
Year	Title	Heatseekers	Billboard 200	Top R&B/Hip-Hop Albums
1992	Somethin 4 Da Youngsta's	-	-	-
1993	The Aftermath	4	126	25
1994	No Mercy	-	-	45
1995	I'll Make U Famous	-	-	-
1997	Icons	-	-	-
2019	Icons 2	-	-	-

=== Singles ===
Year	Title	Chart positions				Album
Year	Title	Hot Rap Singles	Hot R&B/Hip Hop Songs	Hot Dance Singles	Billboard Hot 100	Album
1992	"Pass da Mic"	10	-	-	-	Somethin 4 Da Youngsta's
1993	"Crewz Pop"	3	59	26	-	The Aftermath
1993	"Iz U wit Me"	9	-	-	-	The Aftermath
1994	"Hip Hop Ride"	21	62	21	68	No Mercy
1995	"Mad Props"	36	-	19	-	No Mercy
1995	"I'll Make U Famous"	-	25	-	-	I'll Make U Famous
2020	"Be GREAT"	-	-	-	-	
