= Lords of the Underground =

American hip hop group

- Also known as: L.O.T.U.G.
- Origin: Newark, New Jersey, U.S.
- Genres: Hip hop; East Coast hip hop; golden age hip hop; hardcore hip hop
- Years active: 1990–present
- Labels: Pendulum; Jersey Kidz; Goon MuSick
- Members: DoItAll; Mr. Funke; DJ Lord Jazz

The Lords of the Underground (L.O.T.U.G.) is an American hip-hop trio based in Newark, New Jersey. The group is composed of Dupré Kelly (professionally known as DoItAll) (born January 14, 1971), Al'Terik Wardrick (professionally known as Mr. Funke) (born November 15, 1972) and Bruce A. Colston (professionally known as DJ Lord Jazz) (born November 20, 1968).

== History ==
MCs Mr. Funke and DoItAll Dupré met DJ Lord Jazz (a native of Cleveland) when all three were undergraduates at Shaw University in North Carolina. A friend of DoItAll's introduced the group to legendary producer Marley Marl, who invited them to record at his studio with help from K-Def. In 1990, Redman at the beginning of his career served as DJ for DoItAll of Lords of the Underground at Club Sensations in Newark, New Jersey.

The group released its debut album, Here Come the Lords, on March 9, 1993, on Pendulum/Elektra, with production handled by Marley Marl and K-Def. In 2013, the American magazine Spin added the album to its list of "The 50 Best Rap Albums from 1993". The album peaked at 66 on the Billboard 200 and featured five charting singles, including the group's signature song, "Chief Rocka". In 2015, Complex placed the song in 85th place on its list of "The 100 Greatest Hip-Hop Beats of All Time".

By the end of 1993, the Lords had received an award from BET as best rap group of the year.

The group released its second album, Keepers of the Funk, on Pendulum/EMI, the following year on November 1, 1994. Keepers of the Funk peaked at 47 on the Billboard 200 and featured three charting singles, the most successful of which was "Tic Toc".

The group received negative criticism when it was implied in their 1995 single "Burn Rubber" that they condoned car-jacking. The group claims the song was created specifically for the soundtrack of the car-jacking movie New Jersey Drive.

They reunited for a third album with 1999's Resurrection. Released via Queen Latifah's Jersey Kidz imprint, it was so small-scale a release that few realized that it had been recorded at all. The Lords returned again in 2007 for a fourth album, titled House of Lords; like Resurrection, it failed to reach the Billboard charts.

The Lords are best remembered in connection with the golden age of hip hop. As such, when Nas decided in 2007 to do a remix of his song "Where Are They Now?" which asked the fates of several long-forgotten golden age rappers, the Lords were among those requested to appear. DoItAll Dupré performed eight bars on the track.

DoItAll appeared briefly in the final scene of the final episode of The Sopranos credited as Du Kelly, as one of a series of potentially ominous figures entering the diner. He also appeared on other TV shows: Law & Order as Two Tone, on Oz the HBO series, and on the Christmas episode of 30 Rock on NBC (2008). He has also been in independent movies such as Somewhere in the City with Bai Ling, Rhyme & Reason, and with Treach of Naughty By Nature. He has also starred in an off Broadway play entitled Diss Diss & Diss Dat.

In 2012, the group first performed in Russia as part of the Hip-Hop Don't Stop event and the Soul City 2012 festival.

In 2017, DoItAll revealed he planned on running for Councilman-at-Large for his hometown of Newark. He started his campaign in 2018; although defeated in that year, he was elected on June 14, 2022, to represent the West Ward.

In 2020, Lords of the Underground released its comeback song "Insomniac", produced by Snowgoons. The track is the first single off So Legendary, the group's first album in over a decade. At the end of January, Lords of the Underground released a video for the song "Whats Up", recorded with Onyx, which was later released in a single for this song.

== Discography ==
=== Studio albums ===
Year	Title	Chart positions	
Year	Title	US Pop	US R&B
1993	Here Come the Lords: Released: March 30, 1993; Label: Pendulum/Elektra	66	13
1994	Keepers of the Funk: Released: November 1, 1994; Label: Pendulum/EMI	57	16
1999	Resurrection: Released: April 20, 1999; Label: Jersey Kidz	–	–
2007	House of Lords: Released: August 21, 2007; Label: Affluent	–	–
2025	So Legendary: Released: April 11, 2025; Label: Goon MuSick	–	–
"–" denotes releases that did not chart

=== Compilation albums ===
Year	Title
2014	Lotug 20: The 20th Anniversary Collection, Vol. 1: Released: July 8, 2014; Label: Pirate Recordings, Inc.

=== Singles ===
Year	Single	Chart positions			Album
Year	Single	US Pop	US R&B	US Rap	Album
1992	"Psycho"	–	–	17	Here Come the Lords
1993	"Chief Rocka"	55	35	1	Here Come the Lords
1993	"Funky Child"	74	52	2	Here Come the Lords
1993	"Here Come the Lords"	93	67	18	Here Come the Lords
1994	"Flow On"	–	–	36	Here Come the Lords
1994	"Tic Toc"	73	52	17	Keepers of the Funk
1995	"What I'm After"	111	–	32	Keepers of the Funk
1995	"Faith"	–	–	49	Keepers of the Funk
"–" denotes releases that did not chart or were not released in that territory
