= Artifacts (group) =

Hip-hop group

The Artifacts
- Origin: Newark, New Jersey, U.S.
- Genre: Underground hip-hop
- Years active: 1988–1998; 2009–2022
- Past members: El Da Sensei; Tame One; DJ Kaos

The Artifacts was an underground hip-hop group consisting of El Da Sensei, Tame One and later, DJ Kaos. They hail from Newark, New Jersey. The Artifacts' most popular song is the single "Wrong Side of Da Tracks" Other Artifacts' songs include "Easter", "C'Mon wit da Git Down" and "The Ultimate (You Know The Time)".

== History ==
Also known as "The Brick City Kids", the Artifacts released their first album, Between a Rock and a Hard Place on October 25, 1994. Well-received by underground hip-hop audiences, it featured b-boy and graffiti themes. The album's beats were produced by Buckwild (from the DITC crew) and T-Ray (from the Soul Assassins crew). The Artifacts' second album, That's Them was released on April 15, 1997. It featured similar material, but it did not receive as much recognition as their debut effort. The Artifacts split soon after the release of this second album.

Tame One and El Da Sensei have both continued to release music as solo artists. In 2003, Tame One joined the Weathermen, an underground rap group including Cage Kennylz, Camu Tao, Aesop Rock, and El-P. Soon after joining the Weathermen, Tame One and Cage released the album Waterworld under the name Leak Bros. In 2009, Tame One collaborated with another member of the Definitive Jux label, releasing the album Parallel Uni-Verses with Del the Funky Homosapien. El Da Sensei has released a number of solo albums and collaborated with the Polish rap group The Returners in 2008, as well as East Coast-based group, The Immortals Project in 2009.

== Reunion ==
In August 2009 at the Rock Steady Crew Anniversary Weekend in Newark, New Jersey, Artifacts briefly reunited during a performance by El Da Sensei. According to Tame One, the duo had not reconciled their differences, but when he heard the horn riff that introduces "Wrong Side of da Tracks", he felt like performing it.

On August 2 of the next year, at the Rock Steady Crew 33rd Anniversary Celebration in Newark, both El Da Sensei and Tame One, along with DJ Kaos, performed officially as the Artifacts. They performed several songs from their respective catalogs as well as Artifacts' material at this show. They are in the process of collaborating on a new Artifacts album and Tame One confirmed in an interview on March 22, 2013, that Artifacts are reunited.

Signing with Redefinition Records, the first new Artifacts material in over 10 years was debuted on Redefinition Records' official SoundCloud.

In 2022, the Artifacts released their final album, No Expiration Date, with Buckwild. It was the last album to be released in Tame One's lifetime.

== Discography ==
Album information
Between a Rock and a Hard Place
- Released: October 25, 1994
- Billboard 200 chart position: #137
- R&B/Hip-Hop chart position: #17
- Singles: "Wrong Side of da Tracks", "C'Mon wit da Git Down"
That's Them
- Released: April 15, 1997
- Billboard 200 chart position: #134
- R&B/Hip-Hop chart position: #25
- Singles: "Return to da Wrongside", "The Ultimate", "Collaboration of Mics"
No Expiration Date (with Buckwild)
- Released: November 4, 2022
