= Vic Mensa discography =

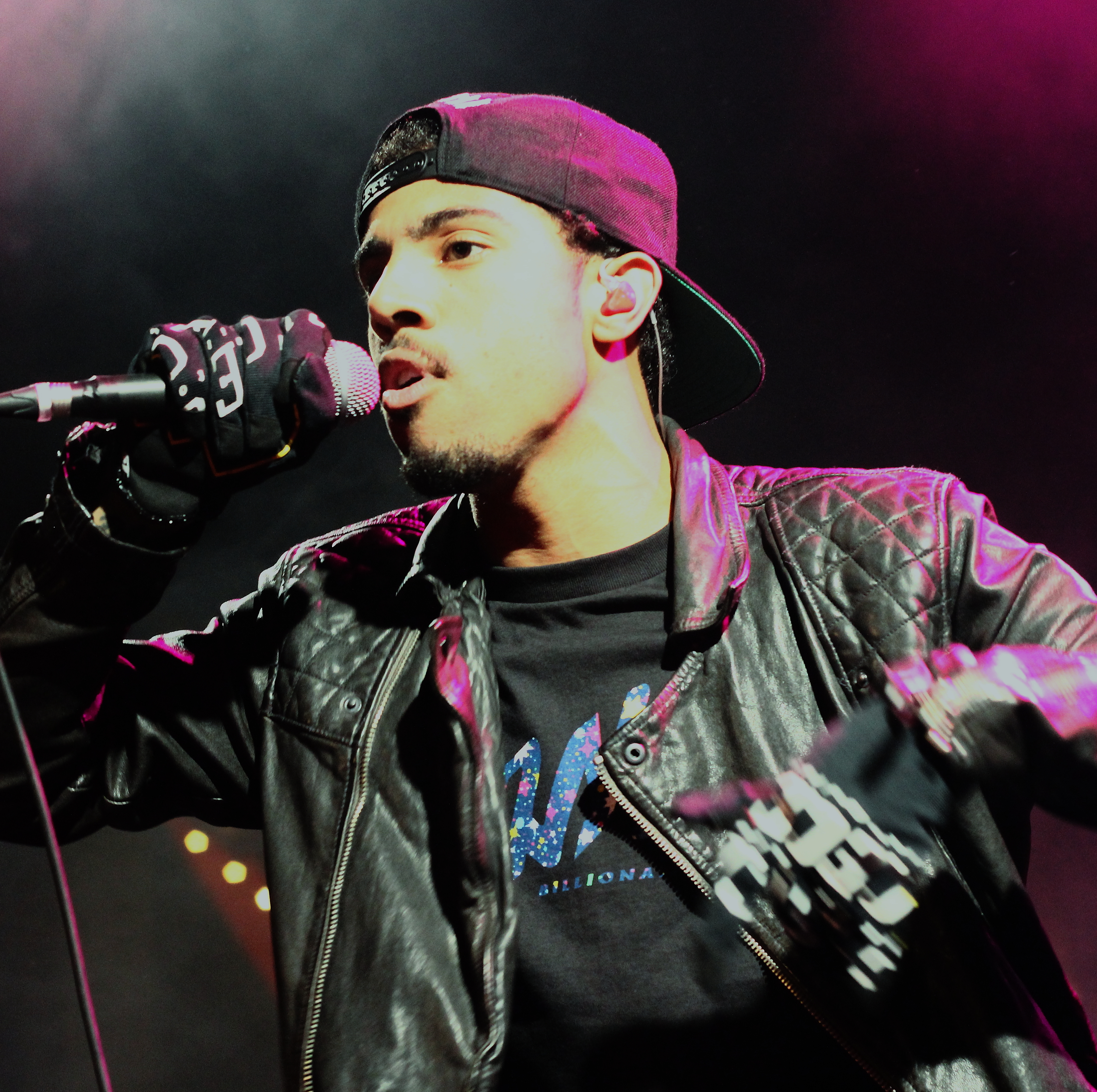
- Vic Mensa performing in 2014
- Studio albums: 2
- EPs: 5
- Singles: 39
- Collaborative albums: 1
- Mixtapes: 1

The discography of American rapper and singer Vic Mensa consists of two studio albums, one collaboration album, one mixtape, five extended plays and 39 singles (including 18 singles as a featured artist).

In July 2010, Vic Mensa released his debut extended play, Straight Up. His debut mixtape, Innanetape, was released on September 30, 2013, to positive reviews from music critics. His debut single, "Down on My Luck" was released in June 2014 by Virgin EMI and later went on to chart at number 37 on the UK Singles Chart. His second single, "U Mad" featuring Kanye West was released in April 2015. Mensa's mixtape and singles was later followed up by his second extended play, There's Alot Going On, which was released in June 2016. Mensa would eventually release his debut studio album, The Autobiography, on July 28, 2017. The album debuted at number 27 on the US Billboard 200 chart.

In December 2018, Mensa released his fourth extended play titled, Hooligans. Mensa would later release a self-titled collaborative album with his band, 93Punx, on August 23, 2019. His fifth extended play, V Tape, was released on August 21, 2020.

== Albums ==
=== Studio albums ===
List of studio albums, with selected chart positions and details
| Title | Album details | Peak chart positions | | | | Sales |
| Title | Album details | US | US R&B/HH | US Rap | NZ Heat | Sales |
|---|---|---|---|---|---|---|
| The Autobiography | Released: July 28, 2017; Label: Roc Nation; Format: CD, digital download | 27 | 18 | 14 | 8 | US: 13,021 |
| Victor | Released: September 15, 2023; Label: Roc Nation; Format: Digital download, streaming | — | — | — | — | |

== Collaborative albums ==
List of collaborative studio albums, with selected details
| Title | Album details |
|---|---|
| 93Punx (with 93Punx) | Released: August 23, 2019; Label: Roc Nation; Formats: Digital download, streaming |

== Mixtapes ==
List of mixtapes, with selected details
| Title | Mixtape details |
|---|---|
| Innanetape | Released: September 30, 2013; Label: Self-released; Format: Digital download |

== Extended plays ==
List of extended plays, with selected chart positions and details
| Title | EP details | Peak chart positions | | | |
| Title | EP details | US | US R&B/HH | US Rap | US Heat. |
|---|---|---|---|---|---|
| Straight Up | Released: July 5, 2010; Label: Self-released; Format: Digital download | — | — | — | — |
| There's Alot Going On | Released: June 3, 2016; Label: Roc Nation, Def Jam; Format: CD, digital download | 127 | 14 | 10 | 1 |
| The Manuscript | Released: June 8, 2017; Label: Roc Nation, Capitol; Format: digital download | — | — | — | 25 |
| Hooligans | Released: December 14, 2018; Label: Roc Nation; Format: digital download | — | — | — | — |
| V Tape | Released: August 21, 2020; Label: Roc Nation; Format: Digital download, streaming | — | — | — | — |
| I Tape | Released: March 26, 2021; Label: Roc Nation; Format: Digital download, streaming | — | — | — | — |
| Vino Valentino | Released: February 18, 2022; Label: Roc Nation; Format: Digital download, streaming | — | — | — | — |
"—" denotes a recording that did not chart or was not released in that territory.

== Singles ==
=== As lead artist ===
List of singles as lead artist, with selected chart positions, showing year released and album name
| Title | Year | Peak chart positions | | | | | Certifications | Album |
| Title | Year | US R&B/HH Bub. | US Main. R&B/HH | AUS Urb. | NZ Hot | UK | Certifications | Album |
|---|---|---|---|---|---|---|---|---|
| "Down on My Luck" | 2014 | — | — | 16 | — | 37 | | Non-album singles |
| "U Mad" (featuring Kanye West) | 2015 | 6 | — | — | — | — | RIAA: Gold | Non-album singles |
| "Danger" | 2016 | — | — | — | — | — | | There's Alot Going On |
| "No Chill" (with Skrillex) | 2016 | — | — | — | — | — | | Non-album single |
| "Wings" (featuring Pharrell Williams and Saul Williams) | 2017 | — | — | — | — | — | | The Autobiography |
| "Reverse" (featuring G-Eazy) | 2018 | — | 33 | — | — | — | RIAA: Gold | Hooligans |
| "Metaphysical" | 2018 | — | — | — | — | — | | Non-album singles |
| "Pouring Rain" (with Emmit Fenn) | 2018 | — | — | — | — | — | | Non-album singles |
| "Common Sense" (with Lophiile) | 2018 | — | — | — | — | — | | Non-album singles |
| "Dark Things" | 2018 | — | — | — | — | — | | Hooligans |
| "Fake Decent" (with Kami) | 2019 | — | — | — | — | — | | Non-album singles |
| "Zombie" (with 93Punx) | 2019 | — | — | — | — | — | | Non-album singles |
| "Camp America" (with 93Punx) | 2019 | — | — | — | — | — | | 93Punx |
| "Mood" (with Juj) | 2019 | — | — | — | — | — | | Juj, It's U |
| "3 Years Sober" (with 93Punx and Travis Barker) | 2019 | — | — | — | — | — | | 93Punx |
| "Falling Asleep at the Wheel" (with The Rubens) | 2019 | — | — | — | — | — | | Non-album singles |
| "Let U Know" (with Jesse Rutherford) | 2019 | — | — | — | — | — | | Non-album singles |
| "It's a Bad Dream" (with 93Punx featuring Good Charlotte) | 2019 | — | — | — | — | — | | 93Punx |
| "Summer's Over" (with Keyon Christ) | 2019 | — | — | — | — | — | | Non-album single |
| "No More Teardrops" (featuring Malik Yusef and Wyatt Waddell) | 2020 | — | — | — | — | — | | Reprise |
| "Shelter" (featuring Wyclef Jean and Chance the Rapper) | 2021 | — | — | — | 32 | — | | I Tape |
| "Fr33dom" (featuring Zacari) | 2021 | — | — | — | — | — | | I Tape |
| "$wish" (featuring G-Eazy and Chance the Rapper) | 2023 | — | — | — | — | — | | Victor |
"—" denotes a recording that did not chart or was not released in that territory.

=== As featured artist ===
List of singles, with year released and album name shown
| Title | Year | Album |
|---|---|---|
| "Fast Life" (Asher Roth featuring Vic Mensa) | 2014 | RetroHash |
| "Drive Me Crazy" (Kaytranada featuring Vic Mensa) | 2015 | 99.9% |
| "Have U Eva" (Leather Corduroys featuring Vic Mensa) | 2015 | Non-album single |
| "Go with It" (The Internet featuring Vic Mensa) | 2015 | Ego Death |
| "Around My Way" (Young Chop featuring Vic Mensa and King 100 James) | 2015 | Finally Rich Too and King Chop |
| "Gang with Me" (Towkio featuring Vic Mensa) | 2016 | Community Service 2! |
| "Right Now" (Kami featuring Vic Mensa) | 2016 | Just Like the Movies |
| "MC" (Danny Diezel featuring Vic Mensa and Joey Fernandez) | 2017 | J.C.A.C |
| "Coldplay" (Mr Hudson featuring Vic Mensa) | 2017 | Non-album singles |
| "Freedom Is a Word" (Christian Scott aTunde Adjuah featuring Vic Mensa) | 2017 | Non-album singles |
| "Till the World Falls" (Nile Rodgers & Chic featuring Mura Masa, Cosha, and Vic Mensa) | 2018 | It's About Time |
| "Unfuckingfortunately!" (Keyon Christ featuring Vic Mensa) | 2018 | They Don't Want Us |
| "Dripping Summers" (Christian Rich featuring Little Dragon and Vic Mensa) | 2018 | Non-album singles |
| "Mercy" (Grace Weber featuring Vic Mensa) | 2018 | Non-album singles |
| "Chicago" (Mr Hudson featuring Vic Mensa) | 2019 | When the Machine Stops |
| "Shibuya (Ghost II)" (Christian Rich featuring Jaden, Belly, and Vic Mensa) | 2019 | Non-album single |
| "Vicki, Is the Water Warm Enough" (Sherman's Showcase featuring Vic Mensa) | 2019 | Sherman's Showcase (Original Soundtrack) |
| "Hangerz" (Pussy Riot featuring Vic Mensa and Junglepussy) | 2019 | Non-album single |
| "Practice" (Nadia Nakai featuring Vic Mensa) | 2020 | Nadia Naked |
| "To the Night" (Ashwarya featuring Vic Mensa) | 2021 | Nocturnal Hours |
| "Scattered" (Lauren Jauregui featuring Vic Mensa) | 2021 | Prelude |
| "Ride or Die" (ZZ Ward featuring Vic Mensa) | 2023 | Dirty Shine |

== Other charted and certified songs ==
List of songs, with selected chart positions, showing year released and album name
| Title | Year | Peak chart positions | | Certifications | Album |
| Title | Year | US Dance | AUS | Certifications | Album |
|---|---|---|---|---|---|
| "Cocoa Butter Kisses" (Chance The Rapper featuring Vic Mensa and Twista) | 2013 | — | — | RMNZ: Gold | Acid Rap |
| "Lose It" (Flume featuring Vic Mensa) | 2016 | 30 | 63 | | Skin |
| "Liquor Locker" (featuring Ty Dolla Sign) | 2016 | — | — | RIAA: Gold | There's Alot Going On |
"—" denotes a recording that did not chart or was not released in that territory.

== Guest appearances ==
List of non-single guest appearances, with other performing artists, showing year released and album name
| Title | Year | Other artist(s) | Album |
|---|---|---|---|
| "Family" | 2012 | Chance the Rapper, Sulaiman | 10 Day |
| "Cocoa Butter Kisses" | 2013 | Chance the Rapper, Twista | Acid Rap |
| "Money Clip" | 2014 | Chuck Inglish, Retch, Hassani Kwess, Sulaiman | Convertibles |
| "Involved" | 2015 | Towkio | .Wav Theory |
| "I'm Yours" | 2015 | Justine Skye | Emotionally Unavailable |
| "Lay It All on Me (Remix)" | 2015 | Rudimental, Big Sean, Ed Sheeran | Non-album single |
| "What It Takes" | 2015 | Gucci Mane, Bandman Kevo | East Atlanta Santa 2: The Night Guwop Stole X-Mas |
| "Northstar" | 2016 | Malcolm London, Maceo Haymes | Opia |
| "Wolves" | 2016 | Kanye West, Sia | The Life of Pablo |
| "Lose It" | 2016 | Flume | Skin |
| "Winners Circle" | 2016 | Joey Purp | iiiDrops |
| "Go Tell 'Em" | 2016 | None | The Birth of a Nation: The Inspired By Album |
| "Keep on Slippin'" | 2016 | Injury Reserve | Floss |
| "All Good" | 2016 | Liz | Cross Your Heart |
| "Talk About It" | 2017 | Erik Hassle | Innocence Lost |
| "Just Like the Movies" | 2017 | Kami, Joey Purp, Knox Fortune, Towkio | Just Like the Movies |
| "High in the Woods (Remix)" | 2017 | Johan | Wilds - EP |
| "Forever" | 2018 | Towkio | WWW. |
| "No Bow Wow Challenge" | 2018 | Brian Fresco | Love Scars |
| "Made an America (Remix)" | 2018 | Fever 333, Travis Barker | Non-album single |
| "Farm to Table" | 2023 | Mick Jenkins | The Patience |
| "Back to the Go" | 2025 | Chance the Rapper | Star Line |
