= Down on My Luck (disambiguation) =

"Down on My Luck" is a 2014 song by American rapper Vic Mensa

Down on My Luck may also refer to:

- "Down on My Luck", song from Madea Goes to Jail (play)
- "Down on My Luck", song by David Byron, written David Byron and Daniel Boone, from Baby Faced Killer
