= Leather Corduroys =

American hip hop group

- Origin: Chicago, Illinois
- Genres: Hip hop
- Years active: 2012–present
- Members: Kami; Joey Purp
- Website: www.leathercorduroys.club

Leather Corduroys is an American hip hop group from Chicago, Illinois. It consists of Kami (sometimes stylized as KAMI) and Joey Purp. They are part of the Savemoney crew. It was described by HipHopDX as "a group intent on busting through limitations within the genre while simultaneously exploring its outer frontiers."

== History ==
In 2014, Leather Corduroys released an EP, titled Porno Music Volume II: TSFR, which received a favorable review from Chicago Reader. In 2015, the duo released the first studio album, Season. The music video for "Lucile", a song off of the album, was directed by Jake Osmun. In that year, Leather Corduroys also released "Have U Eva", a single featuring rapper Vic Mensa.

== Discography ==
=== Albums ===
- Season (2015)
- YOU AND THE MONEY (2022)

=== EPs ===
- Porno Music Volume II: TSFR (2014)

=== Singles ===
- "Dat Strong" (2014)
- "Have U Eva" (2015)

=== Guest appearances ===
- Towkio - "Sh!t 2.0" from Hot Chips n Chop Stix (2014)
- Towkio - "God in Me" from .Wav Theory (2015)
