= IiiDrops =

iiiDrops

Mixtape by Joey Purp
- Released: May 26, 2016
- Genre: Hip-hop
- Length: 38:23
- Label: Self-released
- Producers: OddCouple; Knox Fortune; Peter Cottontale; Ducko McFli; The Gift; Garren; Thelonious Martin; Nico Segal; J.P Floyd; Carter Lang; Franco Davis; Smoko Ono

Joey Purp chronology
The Purple Tape (2012)	iiiDrops (2016)	Quarterthing (2018)

Singles from iiiDrops
- 1. "Girls @" Released: May 19, 2016

iiiDrops is the second mixtape by Chicago rapper Joey Purp. It was released on May 26, 2016. It includes guest appearances from Mick Jenkins, Saba, Teddy Jackson, TheMind, and fellow Savemoney collaborators Vic Mensa and Chance the Rapper. A music video was created for "Girls @".

== Critical reception ==
Professional ratings
Review scores
Source	Rating
Pitchfork	8.2/10
Rolling Stone	3.5/5 stars
Spin	8/10
Vice (Expert Witness)	A−

Pitchfork included it on the "20 Best Rap Albums of 2016" list. Rolling Stone placed it at number 31 on the "40 Best Rap Albums of 2016" list. Complex placed it at number 36 on the "50 Best Albums of 2016" list. Vice placed it at number 85 on the "100 Best Albums of 2016" list.

== Track listing ==
No.	Title	Producer(s)	Length
1.	"Morning Sex"	OddCouple	3:31
2.	"Girls @" (featuring Chance the Rapper)	Knox Fortune; Peter Cottontale^{[a]}	3:33
3.	"Money & Bitches" (featuring Mick Jenkins)	Ducko McFli; Knox Fortune^{[a]}	4:08
4.	"When I'm Gone" (featuring Teddy Jackson)	The Gift	2:44
5.	"Photobooth"	Garren; Knox Fortune^{[a]}	2:57
6.	"Cornerstore" (featuring Saba and TheMind)	Thelonious Martin; Nico Segal^{[a]}; Cottontale^{[a]}; J.P Floyd^{[a]}; Knox Fortune^{[a]}	4:19
7.	"Say You Do"	Knox Fortune; Cottontale^{[a]}	2:52
8.	"Godbody"	Martin; Cottontale^{[a]}; Carter Lang^{[a]}	2:39
9.	"Kids"	Knox Fortune; Franco Davis^{[a]}	3:35
10.	"Winners Circle" (featuring Vic Mensa)	Smoko Ono; Martin	4:48
11.	"Escape"	The Gift; Cottontale^{[a]}; Lang^{[a]}	3:13
Total length:			38:23

Bonus tracks
No.	Title	Producer(s)	Length
12.	"Morgan Freeman"	Ikaz	3:16
13.	"Run It Up"	Dimeji Faluyi	2:50

=== Notes ===
- Mixed by Steve Anderson at Private Stock Studios (Chicago, Illinois).
- "Girls @" & "Say You Do" mixed by Elton "L10MixedIt" Chueng at Classick Studios (Chicago, Illinois).
- Mastered by Alex "Papi Beatz" Baez at Private Stock Studios (Chicago, Illinois).
- ^{^[a]} signifies an additional producer.
- "Morning Sex" features additional vocals by Teddy Jackson and Erica Renee.
- "Escape" features additional vocals by Teddy Jackson and Knox Fortune.
