= Marrow (band) =

- Origin: Chicago, Illinois
- Genres: Rock, indie rock
- Years active: 2013–present
- Label: Foxhall Records
- Members: Macie Stewart; Liam Kazar; Dorian Gehring; Matt Carroll
- Past members: Lane Beckstrom
- Website: www.marrowmakesmusic.com

Marrow is an American rock band from Chicago, Illinois. The band consists of three former members of the Chicago band Kids These Days, as well as one new member.

== History ==
After the break up of Kids These Days, Macie Stewart and Liam Kazar (Liam Cunningham) were still interested in writing music and being in a band. In 2013, along with former bandmate, Lane Beckstrom, Marrow was formed. Matt Carroll, not a member of Kids These Days, also joined the group. The band released their first EP, titled Two, in December of the same year. A single music video for both songs on the EP was also released.

On September 4, 2015, Marrow released their debut full-length album Gold Standard via Foxhall Records. On November 19, 2015, Impose Magazine released a new song by Marrow titled "Fool".

== Beyond Marrow ==
Macie Stewart went on to many musical other projects in Chicago, most notably Finom (formerly called OHMME), with Matt Carroll sometimes accompanying. Liam Kazar backed Tweedy on tour. In 2021, Kazar released a solo album and was regularly performing in Chicago, including with his band. Gehring, Kazar, Kazar's sister Sima Cunningham, Sullivan Davis, and Spencer Tweedy frequently join Andrew Sa's Cosmic Country Showcase band, in Chicago and Milwaukee, Wisconsin, as of 2021–2022.

== Band members ==
- Macie Stewart (vocals, keyboard, guitar)
- Liam Kazar (vocals, guitar)
- Dorian Gehring (bass)
- Matt Carroll (drums)

== Discography ==
Studio albums

- The Gold Standard (2014, Foxhall Records)

EPs

- Two (2013, self-released)
