= When the Distance Is Blue =

Studio album by Macie Stewart
- Released: March 21, 2025
- Length: 37:57
- Label: International Anthem

Macie Stewart chronology
Mouth Full of Glass (2022)	When the Distance Is Blue (2025)

Singles from When the Distance Is Blue
- 1. "Spring Becomes You, Spring Becomes New" Released: February 4, 2025

When the Distance Is Blue is the second studio album by American multi-instrumentalist Macie Stewart. It was released on March 21, 2025, via International Anthem.

== Background ==
Preceded by Stewart's debut Mouth Full of Glass in 2022, When the Distance Is Blue is noted as an instrumental album composed with field recordings, piano, and strings, including violin, viola and cello. The album title is derived from an essay by Rebecca Solnit titled The Blue of Distance.

"Spring Becomes You, Spring Becomes New", the lead single of the album, was released on February 4, 2025.

== Reception ==
Professional ratings
Review scores
Source	Rating
AllMusic	4/5 stars
Pitchfork	7.4/10
Record Collector	4/5 stars

Paul Bowler of Record Collector rated the album four stars and described several songs from the album including "Murmuration/Memorization", "Spring Becomes You, Spring Becomes New", and "Disintegration" as consisting of "rich atmosphere", "gamelan-like piano", "richly cinematic soundscapes."

When the Distance Is Blue received a rating of four stars from AllMusic, whose reviewer noted, the album "gently, quietly, and poignantly travels through bardos – the spaces between – not seeking resolution, but a name for the composer's unanswered longing, and ours."

Pitchfork gave the album a score of 7.4 out of ten, describing it as "an eight-part suite of improvisational chamber ambient, tinted by the limpid colors of an in-between space, peering across absence without attempting to resolve or subdue it."

== Track listing ==
No.	Title	Length
1.	"I Forget How to Remember My Dreams"	6:06
2.	"Tsukiji"	0:45
3.	"Murmuration/Memorization"	7:13
4.	"Spring Becomes You, Spring Becomes New"	6:42
5.	"Stariwell (Before And After)"	6:51
6.	"What Fills You Up Won't Leave an Empty Cup"	3:37
7.	"In Between"	1:19
8.	"Disintegration"	5:24
Total length:		37:57

== Personnel ==
Credits for When the Distance Is Blue adapted from AllMusic.

- Macie Stewart – composer, field recording, photography, piano, prepared piano, violin, vocals
- Lia Kohl – cello
- Whitney Johnson – viola
- Zach Moore – double bass
- David Allen – mastering
- Aaron Denton – layout design
- Dave Vettraino – engineer, mixing, photography
- Shannon Marks – photography
- Zander Raymond – artwork, design
