= .Wav Theory =

Mixtape by Towkio
- Released: April 28, 2015
- Genre: Hip hop
- Length: 36:42
- Label: self-released
- Producer: Towkio; The Social Experiment; Stefan Ponce; Kaytranada; Cam O'bi; Two Fresh; Nate Fox; Walkingshoe; FKJ; Carter Lang; Peter Cottontale; Mojek; Lido; Knox Fortune

Towkio chronology
Hot Chips n Chop Stix (2014)	.Wav Theory (2015)	Community Service 2 (2016)

.Wav Theory (sometimes stylized as .WAV Theory) is a mixtape by American rapper Towkio. It was released on April 28, 2015. It includes production from Kaytranada and Lido, as well as guest appearances from Vic Mensa and Chance the Rapper. Music videos were created for "I Know You", "Free Your Mind", ".Wav Theory", "Reflection", and "Clean Up".

== Critical reception ==
Professional ratings
Review scores
Source	Rating
Consequence of Sound	C+
Pitchfork	6.2/10
RedEye	3.5/4 stars

Matthew Strauss of Pitchfork gave the mixtape a 6.2 out of 10, writing, "Towkio's nebulousness leaves .Wav Theory as an enjoyable album that asks few questions and gives few answers." Adam Kivel of Consequence of Sound gave the mixtape a C+ grade, commenting that it is full of "energetic, fun tracks with middling verses."

It was placed at number 27 on Complex's "Best Albums of 2015" list, number 13 on RedEye's "20 Best Albums of 2015" list, and number 9 on Chicago Tribune's "Top 10 Chicago Indie Albums of 2015" list.

== Track listing ==
No.	Title	Producer(s)	Length
1.	".Wav Theory"	Towkio; The Social Experiment	2:06
2.	"Clean Up" (featuring Chance the Rapper)	Stefan Ponce; The Social Experiment	3:28
3.	"Involved" (featuring Vic Mensa)	Kaytranada	2:48
4.	"Free Your Mind" (featuring Donnie Trumpet)	Cam O'bi; The Social Experiment	3:20
5.	"God in Me" (featuring Leather Corduroys)	Two Fresh; Nate Fox	3:01
6.	"RN"	Walkingshoe	2:53
7.	"I Know You"	FKJ	3:34
8.	"Addicted (Interlude)"	Towkio; Carter Lang	1:20
9.	"Reflection"	Kaytranada; Peter Cottontale	4:00
10.	"Break You Off"	Carter Lang; Mojek; Peter Cottontale	3:23
11.	"Heaven Only Knows" (featuring Chance the Rapper, Lido, and Eryn Allen Kane)	Lido	3:43
12.	"Oscillate"	Towkio; Knox Fortune; The Social Experiment	3:00
