= Quarterthing =

Studio album by Joey Purp
- Released: September 7, 2018
- Recorded: 2018
- Genre: Hip-hop
- Length: 36:38
- Labels: Joey Purp LLC; Caroline
- Producers: Thelonious Martin; DJ Khalil; Joey Purp; Nico Segal; Peter Wilkins; Nez & Rio; DJ Taye; Knox Fortune; Garren Langford; Smoko Ono

Joey Purp chronology
iiiDrops (2016)	Quarterthing (2018)

Singles from Quarterthing
- 1. "Bag Talk" Released: August 20, 2018; 2. "Elastic" Released: September 4, 2018

Quarterthing (stylized as QUARTERTHING) is the debut studio album by Chicago rapper Joey Purp. It was released on September 7, 2018. Music videos were created for "Bag Talk" and "Aw Sh*t!".

== Critical reception ==
Professional ratings
Review scores
Source	Rating
HipHopDX	4.2/5
Pitchfork	8.3/10
PopMatters	8/10 stars

Kenan Draughorne of HipHopDX gave the album a 4.2 out of 5, calling it "an impressive step forward, instantly captivating with undeniable replay value." Sheldon Pearce of Pitchfork gave the album an 8.3 out of 10, saying: "These are songs that refuse to be beholden to what came before, songs that understand and even cherish their connections to music of the past but have entirely different destinations in mind."

Consequence of Sound placed it at number 41 on the "Top 50 Albums of 2018" list.

== Track listing ==
No.	Title	Producer(s)	Length
1.	"24K Gold/Sanctified" (featuring Ravyn Lenae and Jack Red)	Thelonious Martin	4:01
2.	"Godbody Pt. 2" (featuring RZA)	DJ Khalil	2:34
3.	"Hallelujah"	Joey Purp; Nico Segal; Peter Wilkins	2:15
4.	"Elastic"	Nez & Rio	2:06
5.	"Aw Sh*t!"	DJ Taye; Knox Fortune	2:36
6.	"Quarterthing"	Knox Fortune	3:09
7.	"Paint Thinner"	Garren Langford; Smoko Ono	2:32
8.	"Look at My Wrist" (featuring Cdot Honcho)	Smoko Ono	2:57
9.	"2012"	Knox Fortune	3:04
10.	"Fessional/Diamonds Dancing" (featuring Queen Key)	Nez & Rio	3:26
11.	"Karl Malone"	Nez & Rio	2:37
12.	"Bag Talk"	Nez & Rio	2:32
13.	"Lebron James"	Thelonious Martin	2:19
14.	"In the Morning" (featuring GZA)	Joey Purp	0:30
Total length:			36:38
