= To the Night (disambiguation) =

To the Night is a 2018 film.

To the Night may also refer to:

- "To the Night" (Kanon), a television episode
- "To the Night", a song by Vic Mensa
