= There's Alot Going On =

Mixtape by Vic Mensa
- Released: June 3, 2016
- Genre: Hip hop
- Length: 32:53
- Label: Roc Nation; Def Jam
- Producer: Carter Lang; Knox Fortune; Papi Beatz; Peter CottonTale; Smoko Ono; Vic Mensa

Vic Mensa chronology
Innanetape (2013)	There's Alot Going On (2016)	The Manuscript (2017)

Singles from There's Alot Going On
- 1. "Danger" Released: February 13, 2016

Professional ratings
Review scores
Source	Rating
HipHopDX	3.7/5
Pitchfork	7.5/10
The Star	3.5/5 stars
Vice (Expert Witness)	A−
XXL	4/5

There's Alot Going On is the second mixtape by American rapper Vic Mensa. It was released on June 3, 2016, through Roc Nation for retail. It serves as a prelude for his debut album, The Autobiography.

== Background ==
In this EP, Vic Mensa expresses his point of view about personal issues and recent events such as Flint Michigan's water crisis and the murder of Laquan McDonald. Mensa even talks about himself suffering some self-inflicted wounds. The EP's production was provided by Papi Beatz himself, along with the additional production such as Smoke Ono, Knox Fortune, Carter Lang, and Mensa himself. "Liquor Locker" features a guest appearance from Ty Dolla Sign. The title of the EP comes from Guns N' Roses' music video for "Don't Cry".

== Promotion ==
On February 13, 2016, Vic Mensa released a track, called "Danger". This track was posted, after it premiered at Kanye West's Yeezy Season 3 fashion show at the Madison Square Garden. On June 6, 2016, which is Mensa's birthday, Vic Mensa released the music video for the title track, "There's Alot Going On". On October 22, 2016, he released the music video for "16 Shots".

== Critical reception ==
Matthew Strauss of Pitchfork gave the EP a 7.5 out of 10, calling it Vic Mensa's "best and boldest" work so far. Scott Glaysher of XXL said, "There are a variety of instruments used throughout, which is refreshing to hear in today's musical climate — no songs sound the same and all fat is trimmed."

Rolling Stone placed it at number 39 on the "40 Best Rap Albums of 2016" list. HipHopDX named it as one of the best mixtapes of 2016.

== Track listing ==
No.	Title	Writer(s)	Producer(s)	Length
1.	"Dynasty"	Victor Mensah; Alex Baez	Papi Beatz	3:55
2.	"16 Shots"	Mensah; Baez; Alexandra Tamposi; Malik Yusef	Papi Beatz; Vic Mensa^{[b]}	5:45
3.	"Danger"	Mensah; Baez	Papi Beatz	3:57
4.	"New Bae"	Mensah; Baez; Darian Garcia; Michaela Shiloh	Papi Beatz; Smoko Ono^{[b]}	4:21
5.	"Liquor Locker" (featuring Ty Dolla Sign)	Mensah; Baez; Garcia; Tyrone Griffin, Jr.	Papi Beatz; Smoko Ono^{[b]}	4:18
6.	"Shades of Blue"	Mensah; Baez; Garcia; Carter Lang	Papi Beatz; Vic Mensa^{[a]}; Smoko Ono^{[a]}; Lang^{[b]}	4:46
7.	"There's Alot Going On"	Mensah; Baez; Garcia; Kevin Rhomberg; Lang; Peter Cottontale	Papi Beatz; Smoko Ono^{[a]}; Knox Fortune^{[b]}; Lang^{[b]}; CottonTale^{[b]}	5:51
Total length:				32:53

Notes

- ^{^[a]} signifies a co-producer.
- ^{^[b]} signifies an additional producer.
- "16 Shots" features additional vocals by Alexandra Tamposi.
- "New Bae", "Shades of Blue" and "There's Alot Going On" feature additional vocals by Mickey Shiloh.

== Charts ==
Chart (2016)	Peak position
US Billboard 200	127
US Heatseekers Albums (Billboard)	1
US Top R&B/Hip-Hop Albums (Billboard)	14
