= All Day (Kanye West song) =

2015 single by Kanye West

Single by Kanye West featuring Theophilus London, Allan Kingdom and Paul McCartney
- Released: March 3, 2015
- Recorded: 2014–2015
- Genre: Hip-hop
- Length: 5:10
- Label: GOOD; Def Jam
- Songwriters: Kanye West; Paul McCartney; Allan Kyariga; Tyler Bryant; Karim Kharbouch; Sean Combs; Ernest Brown; Kendrick Duckworth; Cydel Young; Victor Mensah; Mike Dean; Che Pope; Noah Goldstein; Allen Ritter; Mario Winans; Charles Njapa; Patrick Reynolds; Malik Jones; Rennard East; Noel Ellis
- Producers: West; French Montana; Puff Daddy; Velous; Charlie Heat

Kanye West singles chronology
| "Blessings" (2015) | "All Day" (2015) | "U Mad" (2015) |

Theophilus London singles chronology
| "JFK" (2014) | "All Day" (2015) | "Revenge" (2016) |

Allan Kingdom singles chronology
| "Uvaje'd" (2012) | "All Day" (2015) | "Blast" (2015) |

Paul McCartney singles chronology
| "FourFiveSeconds" (2015) | "All Day" (2015) | "Love Song to the Earth" (2015) |

"All Day" is a song by American rapper Kanye West. It features Trinidadian-American rapper Theophilus London, Canadian rapper Allan Kingdom, and English musician Paul McCartney. The song was produced by West and ten others, including Puff Daddy, French Montana and Travis Scott. Having initially leaked in August 2014 after being announced for release as a single by West, he premiered the song on March 2, 2015 via Power 106 and Hot 97. The following day, it was released for digital download and streaming as a standalone single, through GOOD Music and Def Jam. The song contains a re-recorded sample of "When the Wind Is Blowing" by Paul McCartney and Wings (known colloquially as "Two Fingers") and an interpolation from "Dance with Me" by Jamaican singer Noel Ellis. It includes elements of industrial and drill music, alongside synthesizers. Rapping in a fast flow, West's lyrics center around his success in life and the music industry.

The accompanying Steve McQueen-directed music video was announced in March 2015 and ultimately released in February 2016. The video sees West in a warehouse room running around, though he becomes tired and a song entitled "I Feel Like That" is played. "All Day" received widely positive reviews from music critics, who mostly praised West's vocals. The focus around his vocals was often placed on the flow and lyrical content, while a few critics complimented the catchiness of the song. It was named to year-end lists for 2015 by multiple publications, including NME and Pitchfork. At the 58th Grammy Awards, the song was nominated for both Best Rap Song and Best Rap Performance.

"All Day" peaked within the top 20 of music charts in the United States, the United Kingdom, and Scotland. It has since received platinum certification by the Recording Industry Association of America and silver by the British Phonographic Industry (BPI) in the US and UK, respectively. The song was first performed by West at the 2015 Brit Awards, with the performance including flamethrowers and accompanied by numerous other rappers. West later performed it live on multiple occasions in 2015, including at the NBA Playoffs and Glastonbury Festival.

== Background and recording ==
The song was one of three collaborations between West and McCartney to be released, with the other two being the singles "Only One" (2014) and "FourFiveSeconds" (2015), the latter of which includes Barbadian singer Rihanna alongside the two. In response to criticism of West using the n-word within the song, McCartney stated: "It's a great record, sonically it's brilliant, but quite a few people said, 'You can't be connected with this, there's, like, 40 N-words!" McCartney also said in reference to the usage of the word that he "was actually pleased with it." Allan Kingdom became involved with West through Plain Pat, who was close to West. A phone call was made for Allan Kingdom to join West and Plain Pat's session; he showed West his music during the session and called doing so "nerve-racking." One month after West announced the release of the song, a snippet of it leaked online. Melissa Locker of Time called the snippet "a promising hint" of what will be released by West. "All Day" was premiered live by West at the 2015 Brit Awards on February 25. On March 2, 2015, Rolling Stone provided the first official stream of the track.

West spoke about the recording process behind "All Day" in a July 2014 interview with Zach Baron of GQ, telling Baron: "I would have came in with, like, whatever I come in with. But the balance of a meal is that when people walk in, they want water first." The track's creation started with American rapper Velous, who revealed in a 2015 interview with MTV that he made the skeleton of the instrumental on a friend's couch while watching Saturday Night Live in the summer of 2014. In reference to the creation process, Velous stated: "I worked on that and I had the main part of it, I already had the skeleton of it [and] it was for my big bro French Montana." Velous explained why it ultimately became a West track and not a French Montana track, saying: "I guess Kanye was rocking with it, so he gave it to Kanye and they added some more. Kanye went in, French added some stuff to it and I co-produced it with my big bro." On March 2, 2015, mixer Hudson Mohawke tweeted that the track was finished and mixed. The production credits were heavy, with a total of eleven people being listed as producers; this was reminiscent of the vocal credits for West's single "All of the Lights" (2010). West, French Montana, Puff Daddy, Velous and Charlie Heat were the lead producers, while the other six received credit as additional and co-producers. (Note: Mike Dean and Noah Goldstein co-produced "All Day", and Plain Pat, Travis Scott, Allen Ritter and Mario Winans contributed additional production to the song.) A reference track for "All Day" co-written by American rapper Kendrick Lamar, which was initially thought to be a remix, leaked online in April 2015. In addition, scrapped contributions from rappers Malik Yusef and 2 Chainz have also leaked online.

== Composition and lyrics ==
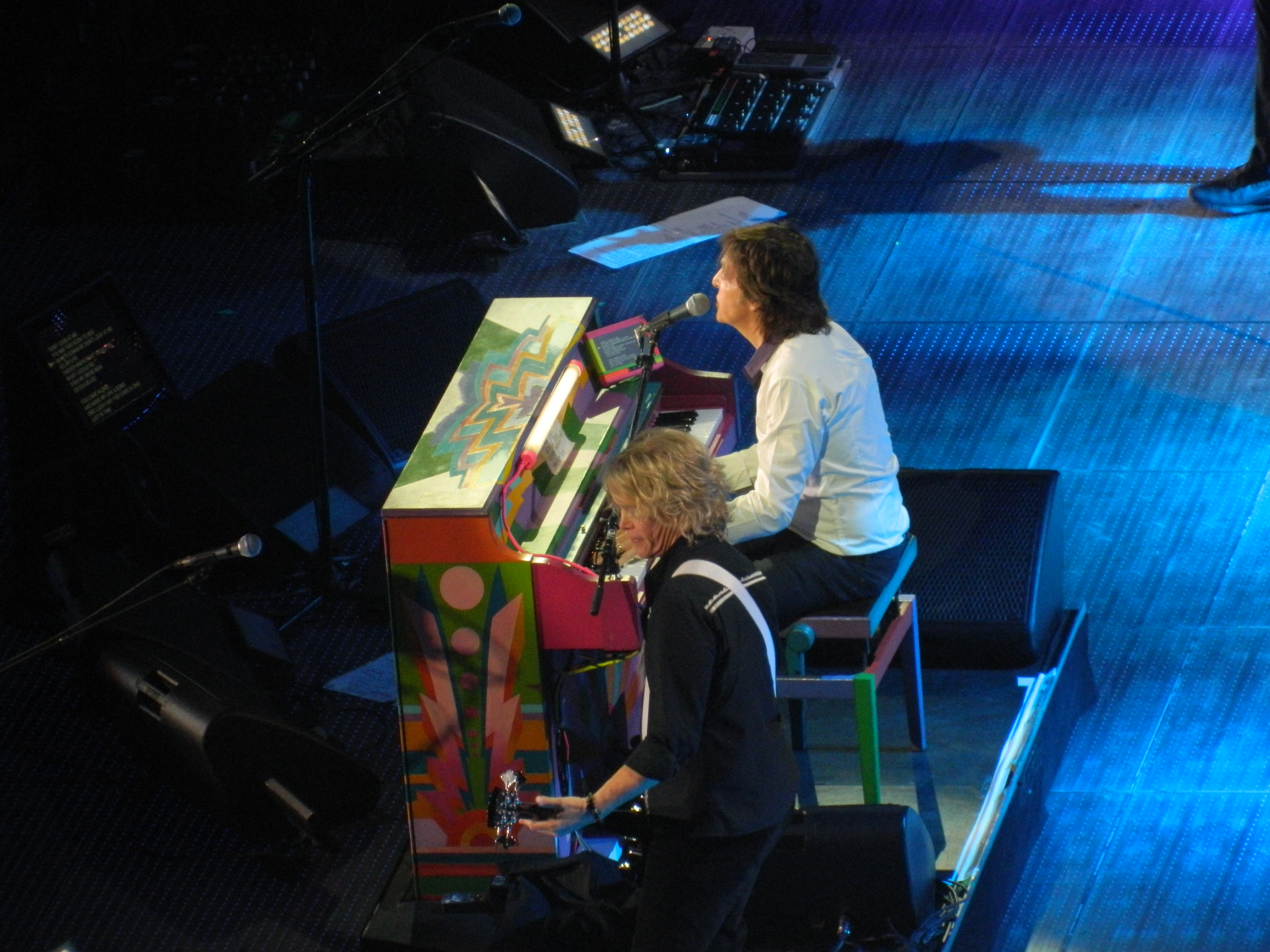
The song's melody is based on whistling of a re-recording from Paul McCartney (pictured top), who defended West's prominent usage of the n-word.

"All Day" includes industrial elements, reminiscent of West's sixth studio album Yeezus (2013). The song also includes elements of drill music, as well as synthesizers in its composition. The melody of the song is built around McCartney's whistling from a re-recording of a song written by him in 1969, titled "When the Wind Is Blowing" (also known to fans as "Two Fingers") as performed by the rock band Paul McCartney and Wings. The chord progression and melody was inspired by Pablo Picasso's 1903-04 painting, The Old Guitarist. The bassline of Reggae singer Noel Ellis' 2006 recording "Dance With Me" is sampled. A voice box melody is included at the beginning of the song, while the ending section of the latter contains a sample of McCartney's whistling on "When the Wind Is Blowing".

The song sees West rap in a fast flow throughout while bragging about his success, including him boasting about spending time in the mall, and the lyrics differentiate from West's usual dwelling on the struggles that he went through to ultimately achieve success. A number of things already commonly known about West are referenced by him in the song, such as him being from Chicago and having an obsession with his wife. The phrase "All day, nigga" is repeatedly used by West within the song and he raps the n-word a total of 45 times. West viewed the lyrics "All day, nigga, it's Ye, nigga/Shopping for the winter, it's just May, nigga/Ball so hard, man, this shit cray, nigga/You ain't getting money unless you got eight figures" as sounding like content that fellow rapper Jay-Z "would have said." West shouts "Get low!" during the outro.

== Release and artwork ==
"All Day" was announced for release as a single by West in July 2014. On March 2, 2015, West premiered the studio version of the song on Power 106 and Hot 97. The next day, the song was released to iTunes Stores in various countries by GOOD Music and Def Jam, and made available for streaming on Spotify. On the same day, it was also serviced to US rhythmic contemporary radio stations through the labels. The song was ultimately scrapped from the track list of West's seventh studio album The Life of Pablo (2016).

The artwork for "All Day" was initially thought to be the album cover for West's then-upcoming album So Help Me God, eventually released with the title The Life of Pablo, when he posted it before the song's release. When West released the song, the information became known that the artwork was intended for the single instead. West's wife Kim Kardashian revealed via Instagram that the artwork is a 13th Century monastic symbol for the Virgin Mary.

== Critical reception ==
The song was met with widely positive reviews from music critics, with West's vocals gathering praise from the majority of them. Jayson Greene of Pitchfork dubbed it as "an odd hybrid" and elaborated, writing: "Kanye's rapping harder, faster, sharper than ever: Years and years into his evolving style, he's fashioned his voice into something dull and jagged at once, a hacked-off piece of jetliner assaulting the beat." Greene viewed West's rapping speed as sounding like American singer James Brown "imitating a tommy gun" at parts and also praised his lyrical content. Kory Grow from Rolling Stone wrote that "the song shows off its triumphant synth line and bouncy beat, as well as West's one-liners like, 'You a fake Denzel like the Allstate nigga/If you run in to me, better have Allstate with you' and guest Allan Kingdom's soulful vocals."

Writing for Bustle, Kenya Foy stated that "West's flow is absolutely crazy" and complimented the song's catchiness, describing it as having the ability to get "the most shiftless couch potato to abandon those comfy cushions" for dancing. Foy elaborated, writing that it "also has the potential to put folks in a sulky mood" due to their daily activities paling in comparison to those undertaken by West. Billboard's Alex Gale commented that the song shows West "at his most unapologetically brash" and observed that he performs "over machine-gun snares" and synths reminiscent of Yeezus, while Gale described West's lyricism as "nimble and quotable." In a less enthusiastic review, Uproxx writer Katie Hasty praised the opening voice box melody and the "cold party vibe" of "All Day" that she compared to West and Jay-Z's collaborative single "Niggas in Paris" (2011), though criticized the composition of the later points within the song. Andrew Barber, Brendan Klinkenberg and Ross Scarano of Complex wrote that it "was a dope single but failed to connect the way" that West had with his earlier singles "Gold Digger" (2005) or "Stronger" (2007) or "Slow Jamz" (2003).

=== Accolades ===
"All Day" was ranked by NME as the 14th best track of 2015, with Emily Barker of the website saying "its rapid-fire braggadocio was a reminder" of West still being both "bolshy-and-bratty" and "political-and-righteous." On The 405's list of 2015's best tracks, the song appeared at number 25. Consequence of Sound listed it as the 26th best track of the year and the staff praised McCartney's involvement, while they called the song "a feverish track" and complemented West's vocals for seeing him "embrace his braggadocious mindset." The song was named the 40th best track of 2015 by Pitchfork, being noted by the staff for standing as West's "proper return to rapping this year" and they wrote that he "made damn sure to snap back hard, reading the riot act to detractors high and low with his most statistically profane performance to date." It also appeared in the top 50 of best tracks year-end lists for two other publications; Time Out London and Fact ranked the song as the 43rd and 49th best track of 2015, respectively. On Pigeons & Planes list of the year's best tracks, the song was listed at number 56. Billboard ranked "All Day" as the 5th best hip hop track of 2015, while the song was listed by Magnetic Magazine as the 10th best hip hop track of the year. It was nominated for Best Rap Song and Best Rap Performance at the 2015 Grammy Awards, respectively. At the 2016 International Dance Music Awards, the song earned a nomination for Best Rap/Hip Hop/Trap Dance Track, ultimately losing to French DJ David Guetta's single "Hey Mama" (2015).

== Music video ==
=== Background ===
During West's hour-long talk at Oxford University on March 2, 2015, he announced a music video for "All Day", stating: "I was sitting with Steve McQueen; he shot the visuals for 'All Day' two days ago. It's completely different to the Brit Awards…" On March 7, West premiered the video at the Foundation Louis Vuitton as part of Paris Fashion Week. Snippets were shared online of it that showed West in a warehouse. West and McQueen later made an unannounced appearance at the Los Angeles County Museum of Art on July 25, 2015, where they unveiled the video, which was filmed in London. Explanations of the visual were offered by both West and McQueen, with the two of them taking it in turns to do so. McQueen revealed that he became involved with West after receiving a phone call from him a few years before the collaboration, with the two engaging in numerous phone conversations afterwards and McQueen started directing the accompanying music video five days after West asked him to. The nine-minute long music video was made available online on February 22, 2016 through London production house Unit Media.

=== Synopsis and reception ===
The accompanying visual for "All Day" was directed by British filmmaker Steve McQueen, best known for directing 12 Years a Slave. It premiered exclusively at the Fondation Louis Vuitton during Paris Fashion Week on March 7, 2015; it has never been officially released on YouTube, although unofficial uploads on the site remain accessible.

In the video, West, on his lonesome, performs the song while running in a small room of a decrepit warehouse. Once the song ends, West collapses on the warehouse floor and breathes heavily while another song—in contrast, a downtempo ballad—begins playing. The unreleased track (titled by several outlets as "I Feel Like That") lyrically delves into West's mental health issues, which have also been referenced in the songs "U Mad" and "FML". (Note: "I Feel Like That" was not released on So Help Me God after the album was scrapped and replaced with The Life of Pablo, which did not include the song.)

Kwame Opam of The Verge said that the music video has a "following you" effect, "with the camera struggling to follow the beleaguered West as he rants back at it." Ryan Bassil of Noisey Vice dubbed it as "artful."

== Commercial performance ==
Additionally, the song became West's second top-20 single in the United States in 2015. "All Day" debuted at number 15 on the US Billboard Hot 100, selling 140,000 downloads in its first week and this led to it entering atop of the US Rap Digital Songs chart. It is West's first single, as a lead artist, to debut at number one on the chart and followed "Clique" (2012) as his second to reach the position. It became the rapper's 22nd top 10 single on the US Billboard Hot R&B/Hip-Hop Songs chart, reaching number 6 on the chart. It entered at number 14 on the US Rap Airplay chart with 11.8 million audience impressions logged, becoming West's 3rd highest debut on the chart and was also streamed 1.9 million times in the US that week. The song was certified platinum in the United States by the Recording Industry Association of America on September 23, 2020.

"All Day" debuted at number 18 on the UK Singles Chart for the issue date of March 8, 2015, while "FourFiveSeconds" peaked at number 3 on the same date. These singles stood as West's only tracks to reach the top 20 of the UK Singles Chart in 2015, with the former spending nine weeks on the chart. The track was later certified silver in the United Kingdom by the British Phonographic Industry for selling 200,000 units on January 5, 2018. As of October 24, 2019, it ranks as West's 35th most successful track of all time on the UK Singles Chart. The track also reached the top 20 in Scotland, peaking at number 19 on the Scottish Singles Chart.

On the Official Finnish Singles Chart, the track debuted at number 23. It charted at number 28 on the Canadian Hot 100 and French SNEP chart respectively; the track stood as West's third top 40 entry in 2015 on the SNEP chart. The track reached number 38 on the Official NZ Singles Chart and achieved a similar position of number 39 on the Denmark Singles Top 40. It peaked at number 42 on the ARIA Singles Chart and lasted one week on the chart. On the Irish Singles Chart, "All Day" debuted at number 52 and spend a total of three weeks on the chart. The song peaked at number 57 on the German Top 100 Singles chart. On the Belgium Urban (Ultratip Flanders) chart, it reached number nine.

== Live performances and other usage ==
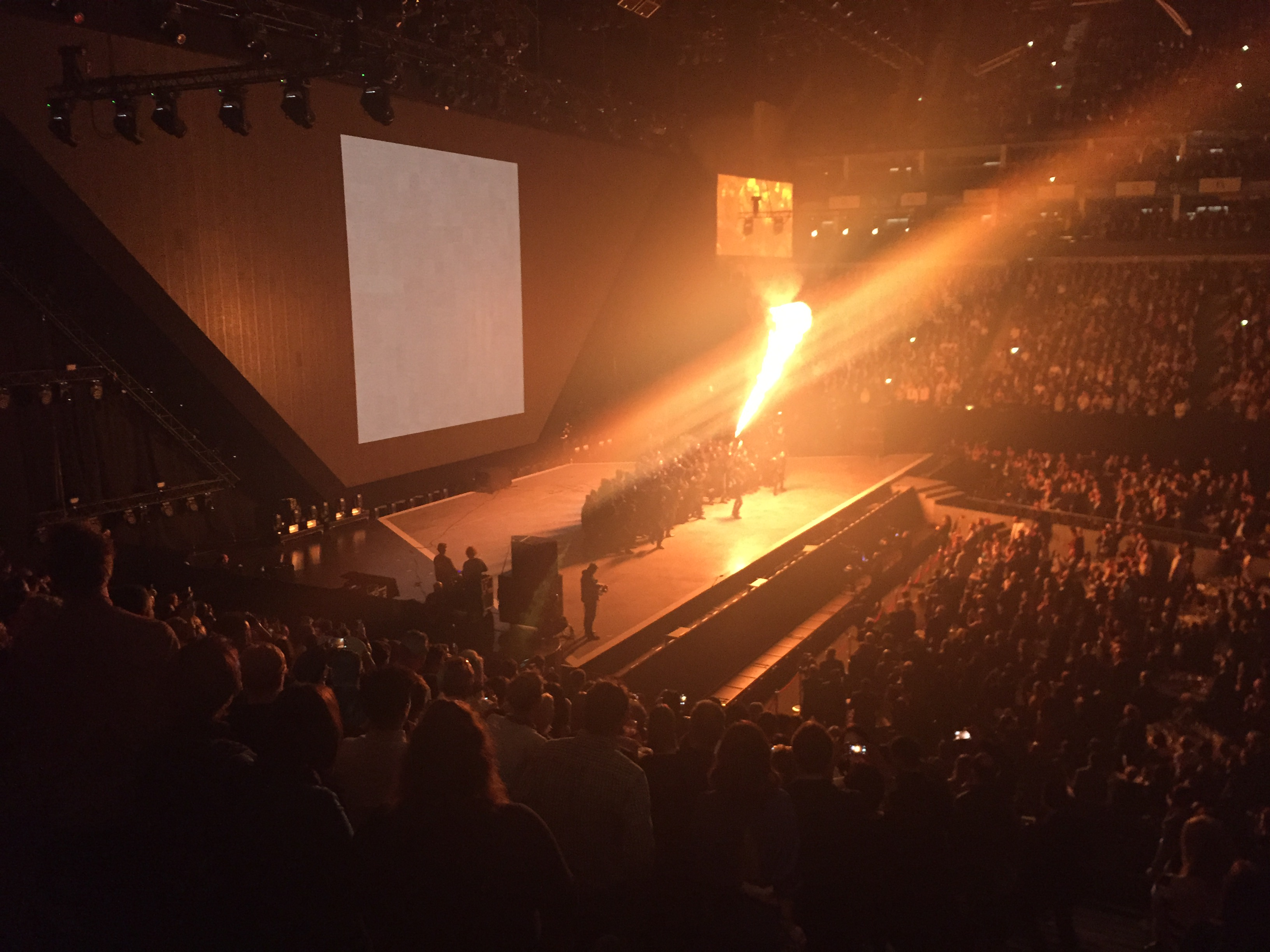
West performing the song at the 2015 Brit Awards, accompanied by numerous other rappers.

West first performed the song live at the 2015 Brit Awards on February 25 with a number of US rappers and UK grime MC's, including Boy Better Know, Novelist, Q-Tip, Krept & Konan, Stormzy, Allan Kingdom, Theophilus London and Vic Mensa. West's performance was announced by Candice Morrissey a day before the awards took place. During the performance, Allan Kingdom shot flames into the air with a flamethrower. However, West's performance was repeatedly muted throughout most of the track for those watching on television due to the extreme explicit language featured within the song's lyrics, with the usage of "nigga" being repeatedly rapped live on ITV. The usage of strong language sparked over 100 complaints received by Ofcom as a result of it. NME reported that West rapped "nigga" a total of fourteen times. West took to Twitter and claimed that he "felt the Brits performance captured the energy of the record." Velous praised West for the performance, claiming that he "had to watch it like 16 times to relive that moment." Oasis lead singer Liam Gallagher called the performance "Utter Shit" on Twitter and claimed that West was "a million miles away" from his debut studio album The College Dropout (2004). British rapper Dizzee Rascal also criticized West for the performance, saying that "Kanye bringing everyone on stage – that's a look," suggesting that it was simply a fashion statement. In 2017, Billboard ranked the performance as the 29th greatest award show performance of all time.

West performed the song live during the first-quarter timeout of the 2015 NBA Playoffs after he jumped on the court. At the 2015 Billboard Music Awards, West performed "All Day" and segued from the song into "Black Skinhead. He was censored at intervals during the performance, with certain lyrics being muted for over 30 seconds. West was audible to home viewers for only four minutes and sixteen seconds out of the five minutes and eighteen seconds that his performance lasted for. At the 2015 Glastonbury Festival, the song was performed live by West. The track was part of the setlist for West's opening show of his Saint Pablo Tour in Indianapolis on August 25, 2016.

American comedian Joe Mande shared his "lyric video" for the song via Twitter on May 22, 2015, which interpreted West as saying "Audi" instead of "All day." The single was used in Audi's TV spot Q commercial in February 2016.

== Track listing ==
- Digital download
1. "All Day" (featuring Theophilus London, Allan Kingdom & Paul McCartney) – 5:10

== Credits and personnel ==
Recording

- Recorded at Shangri La, Malibu, California; Jungle City Studios, New York City, New York; Windmark Recording, Santa Monica, California; Dean's List House of Hits, Soho, NYCB; No Name Studios, Mexico; No Name Studios, London, WardrobeRecordings; Lilayi, Zambia
- Mixed at Health Farm Studios, London

Personnel

- Kanye West – songwriting, production
- Paul McCartney − songwriting
- Velous − songwriting, production
- Kendrick Lamar – songwriting
- French Montana − songwriting, production
- Charlie Heat − songwriting, production
- Cydel Young − songwriting
- Victor Mensah − songwriting
- Allan Kyariga − songwriting
- Mike Dean − songwriting, co-production, recording
- Che Pope − songwriting
- Noah Goldstein − songwriting, co-production, recording, mixing
- Allen Ritter − songwriting, additional production
- Mario Winans − songwriting, additional production
- Charles Njapa − songwriting
- Malik Yusef Jones − songwriting
- Plain Pat − songwriting, additional production
- Rennard East − songwriting
- Noel Ellis − songwriting
- Puff Daddy − production
- Travis Scott − additional production
- Matthew Testa − recording
- Anthony Kilhoffer − recording, mixing
- Steve Orchard − recording
- Sean Oakley − recording assistant
- Zeke Mishanec − recording assistant
- Jeremy "Head" Hartney − recording assistant
- Tristan Bott − recording assistant
- Hudson Mohawke − mixing
- Vlado Meller − mastering
- Jeremy Lubsey − mastering assistant

== Charts ==
=== Weekly charts ===
Chart performance for "All Day"
| Chart (2015) | Peak position |
|---|---|
| Australia (ARIA) | 42 |
| Austria (Ö3 Austria Top 40) | 72 |
| Belgium (Ultratip Bubbling Under Flanders) | 47 |
| Belgium Urban (Ultratop Flanders) | 9 |
| Belgium (Ultratip Bubbling Under Wallonia) | 37 |
| Canada Hot 100 (Billboard) | 28 |
| Czech Republic Singles Digital (ČNS IFPI) | 100 |
| Denmark (Tracklisten) | 39 |
| Finland (Suomen virallinen lista) | 23 |
| France (SNEP) | 28 |
| Germany (GfK) | 57 |
| Ireland (IRMA) | 52 |
| Netherlands (Single Top 100) | 93 |
| New Zealand (Recorded Music NZ) | 38 |
| Scottish Singles Sales (Official Charts) | 19 |
| Swedish Heatseeker (Sverigetopplistan) | 9 |
| Switzerland (Schweizer Hitparade) | 64 |
| UK Singles (Official Charts) | 18 |
| UK Hip Hop/R&B (Official Charts) | 3 |
| US Billboard Hot 100 | 15 |
| US Hot R&B/Hip-Hop Songs (Billboard) | 6 |
| US Rhythmic Airplay (Billboard) | 10 |

=== Year-end charts ===
2015 year-end chart performance for "All Day"
| Chart (2015) | Position |
|---|---|
| Belgium Urban (Ultratop Flanders) | 85 |
| US Hot Rap Songs (Billboard) | 34 |
| US Rap Airplay (Billboard) | 24 |

== Certifications ==
Certifications for "All Day"
| Region | Certification | Certified units/sales |
|---|---|---|
| New Zealand (RMNZ) | Gold | 15,000^{‡} |
| United Kingdom (BPI) | Silver | 200,000^{‡} |
| United States (RIAA) | Platinum | 1,000,000^{‡} |
^{‡} Sales+streaming figures based on certification alone.

== Release history ==
Release dates and formats for "All Day"
| Country | Date | Format | Label | Ref. |
|---|---|---|---|---|
| Various | March 3, 2015 | Digital download | GOOD; Def Jam | |
| Various | March 3, 2015 | Streaming | GOOD; Def Jam | |
| United States | March 3, 2015 | Rhythmic contemporary radio | GOOD; Def Jam | |

== See also ==
- 2015 in hip hop music
