= Fantasize Your Ghost =

Studio album by Ohmme
- Released: June 5, 2020
- Length: 39:22
- Label: Joyful Noise
- Producers: OHMME, Chris Cohen

Ohmme chronology
Parts (2018)	Fantasize Your Ghost (2020)	OHMME (2023)

Professional ratings
Aggregate scores
Source	Rating
AnyDecentMusic?	7.6/10
Metacritic	83/100
Review scores
Source	Rating
AllMusic	4/5 stars
Beats Per Minute	78%
Clash	8/10
Exclaim!	8/10
The Line of Best Fit	8/10
Loud and Quiet	8/10
Paste	7.6/10
Pitchfork	7.5/10
Under the Radar	7/10

Fantasize Your Ghost is the second studio album by American band Ohmme. It was released on June 5, 2020 under Joyful Noise Recordings.

== Background ==
Band members Sima Cunningham and Macie Stewart produced the album with musician Chris Cohen in Wisconsin in August 2019.

== Tour ==
In May 2020, the band announced a tour of North American for January 2021.

== Singles ==
On March 5, 2020, Ohmme announced the release of the album along with the first single "3 2 4 3".

== Critical reception ==
Fantasize Your Ghosts was met with "universal acclaim" reviews from critics. At Metacritic, which assigns a weighted average rating out of 100 to reviews from mainstream publications, this release received an average score of 83, based on 11 reviews. Aggregator Album of the Year gave the album a 79 out of 100 based on 11 reviews.

== Track listing ==
Fantasize Your Ghost track listing
No.	Title	Length
1.	"Flood Your Gut"	3:44
2.	"Selling Candy"	3:27
3.	"Ghost"	3:29
4.	"The Limit"	3:18
5.	"Spell It Out"	4:30
6.	"Twitch"	4:12
7.	"3 2 4 3"	4:05
8.	"Some Kind of Calm"	4:41
9.	"Sturgeon Moon"	4:09
10.	"After All"	3:47
