= Lekan =

Lekan is a Yoruba name common in Nigeria. Other variations of the name includes Olalekan, Olamilekan, Adelekan and it mostly a male first name. It means "my wealth has increased".

== Notable people with the name Lekan ==
- Lekan Babalola, Nigerian jazz percussionist and musician
- Lekan Balogun, Nigerian dramatist and theatre director
- Lekan Balogun (politician), Nigerian senator and Ibadan king
- Lekan Fatodu, Nigerian Journalist

== Notable people with the name Olalekan ==
- Afeez Aremu Olalekan, Nigerian footballer
- Olalekan Bola, Nigerian footballer
- Olalekan Jeyifous, Nigerian-born visual artist
- Joshua Olalekan Ogunwole, Nigerian scientist
- Lateef Olalekan Kayode, Nigerian boxer
- Olalekan Olude, Nigerian Entrepreneur
- Ramoni Olalekan Mustapha, Nigerian politician
- Lekan Salami, Nigerian businessman and football administrator
- Olalekan Sipasi, Nigerian entrepreneur

== Notable people with the name Olamilekan ==
- Olamilekan Adegbite, Nigerian politician
- Afolabi Adedoyin Olamilekan Oluwatimileh Obafemi, English footballer
- Eniola Olamilekan Adedeji, aka DJ Enimoney, Nigerian disc jockey
- Olamilekan Massoud Al-Khalifah Agbeleshebioba, aka Laycon, Nigerian rapper, singer, songwriter, and reality TV star
- Azeez Ramon Olamilekan, Nigerian footballer
- Kareem Olamilekan, Nigerian hyperrealism artist
- Solomon Olamilekan Adeola, Nigerian politician
- Sodiq Olamilekan Fatai, Nigerian footballer

== Lekan as a non-Nigerian name ==
- Boštjan Lekan, Slovenian biathlete
