= Victor (Vic Mensa album) =

Studio album by Vic Mensa
- Released: September 15, 2023
- Length: 49:29
- Label: Roc Nation
- Producer: BongoByTheWay; Demibby; Aesha Dominguez; El Michels Affair; Lpeezy; Thelonious Martin; Vic Mensa; The Mxnxstxr; Stefan Ponce; Subroza

Vic Mensa chronology
93' to 23': Victor (2023)	Victor (2023)

Singles from Victor
- 1. "Strawberry Louis Vuitton" Released: January 27, 2023; 2. "Swish" Released: April 21, 2023; 3. "Eastside Girl" Released: July 28, 2023; 4. "Blue Eyes" Released: August 25, 2023; 5. "Lvln Up" Released: September 11, 2023

Professional ratings
Review scores
Source	Rating
Clash	7/10
The Guardian	3/5 stars

Victor is the second studio album by American rapper Vic Mensa. It was released on September 15, 2023, through Roc Nation.

== Background and singles ==
The album was produced mainly by the rapper himself, along with executive production by BongoByTheWay. He shared an album trailer and announced the record on August 21. The clip shows Mensa sitting shirtless in the center of an art gallery while artists around him paint and closes out with a portrait of him that one of the artists painted. A few days later, Mensa revealed more details on the project. He explained that the album stems from the "rubble of a bad crash, literally and metaphorically" and follows his "journey into spirituality" as well as a return to Chicago, Ghana and to himself.

The lead single "Strawberry Louis Vuitton" was released on January 27 and features Thundercat and Maeta. An accompanying music video was inspired by the late fashion designer Virgil Abloh. On August 25, he released a single called "Blue Eyes", an "emotional" track that see Mensa talking about "heartbreaking admissions" and "damage inflicted by racism". The final single preceding the album "Lvln Up", a "raw" and "reflective" song, was released on September 11 and was inspired by trip from Accra to Keta "through the Ghanian countryside".

== Track listing ==
Victor track listing
No.	Title	Writer(s)	Producer(s)	Length
1.	"Sunday Morning Intro" (featuring Omari Hardwick)	Vic Mensa; Omari Hardwick	Stefan Ponce; Mensa^{[c]}; Aesha Dominguez^{[c]}; Johan Lenox^{[a]}	1:48
2.	"Victor"	Mensa; Uforo Ebong; Adam Wright; Malik Yusef	BongoByTheWay; Mensa^{[a]}; Lenox^{[a]}; Dwayne Verner Jr^{[a]}	3:14
3.	"Rumors"	Mensa; Wright; Yusef	Mensa; BongoByTheWay^{[c]}; Dustin Corbett^{[a]}; Peter Cottontale^{[a]}; DJ Eway^{[a]}; Dominguez^{[a]}; Lenox^{[a]}; Dominic Marino^{[a]}	0:50
4.	"Lvln Up"	Mensa; Wright; Yusef	Mensa; BongoByTheWay^{[c]}; Corbett^{[a]}; Cottontale^{[a]}; DJ Eway^{[a]}; Dominguez^{[a]}; Lenox^{[a]}; Marino^{[a]}	2:08
5.	"The Weeping Poets" (featuring Jay Electronica)	Mensa; Elpadaro Allah; Louis Farrakhan; Yusef	Thelonious Martin; Mensa^{[c]}; BongoByTheWay^{[c]}; Subroza^{[c]}; Corbett^{[a]}; Lenox^{[a]}	2:46
6.	"Swear"	Mensa; Ebong; Wright	BongoByTheWay; Diego Ave^{[c]}; Lenox^{[c]}	2:51
7.	"Swish" (featuring G-Eazy and Chance the Rapper)	Mensah; Chancelor Bennett; Mek'kel Carter; Gerald Gillum; Ebong; Wright; Yusef	BongoByTheWay; Lenox^{[a]}	3:45
8.	"Sunset on the Low End"	Mensa; Ebong; Wright; Yusef	BongoByTheWay; Ponce^{[c]}; Corbett^{[a]}; Lenox^{[a]}	4:08
9.	"Strawberry Louis Vuitton" (featuring Thundercat and Maeta)	Mensa; Leon Michels; Nick Movshon; Paul Spring; Homer Steinweiss; Thundercat; Wright; Yusef	Mensa; El Michels Affair; Thundercat^{[c]}; Dominguez^{[a]}; Lenox^{[a]}	2:38
10.	"Southside Story" (featuring Common)	Mensa; Lonnie Lynn; Yusef	BongoByTheWay; Lenox^{[a]}	3:16
11.	"Law of Karma"	Mensa; Swavell Toliver	BongoByTheWay	3:49
12.	"Blue Eyes"	Mensa; Ebong; William Jones	BongoByTheWay	2:55
13.	"Blue Eyes (Interlude)" (with Rapsody)	Marlanna Evans	Demibby; Subroza	1:13
14.	"Sunday Evening Reprise" (featuring Dixson and Lekan)	Mensa; Darius Dixson	Mensa; Dominguez; Ponce; Lenox^{[a]}	2:08
15.	"All I Kno"	Mensa; Ebong; Carter; Wright; Yusef	BongoByTheWay; Lenox^{[a]}	3:05
16.	"Blessings" (featuring Ant Clemons and D Smoke)	Mensa; Ebong; Daniel Farris; Wright	BongoByTheWay; Corbett^{[a]}; Lenox^{[a]}	3:23
17.	"14 Days" (featuring Mr Hudson)	Mensa; Dominguez; Ebong; Benjamin McIldowie	BongoByTheWay; Dominguez; Lenox^{[a]}	2:30
18.	"Eastside Girl" (Bonus Track; featuring Ty Dolla Sign)	Mensa; Tyrone Griffin, Jr.	Mensa; Lpeezy; The Mxnxstxr; Subroza	3:02
Total length:				49:29

Notes

- ^{^[c]} signifies a co-producer.
- ^{^[a]} signifies an additional producer.
- "Swish" is stylized as "$wish".
- "Southside Story" is stylized as "$outside Story".
- "Blessing" is stylized as "Ble$$ings".

== Personnel ==
Musicians

- Vic Mensa – vocals
- Lekan – additional vocals (tracks 1, 16)
- Omari Hardwick – additional vocals (1)
- Elpadardo Allah – additional vocals (5)
- Johan Lenox – additional vocals (5, 9)
- Thundercat – additional vocals (9)
- BongoByTheWay – additional vocals (10)
- Aesha Dominguez – additional vocals (10)
- Lonnie Lynn – additional vocals (10)
- Brandon Mahone – additional vocals (10)
- Malik Yusef – additional vocals (10)
- Demibby – background vocals, guitar, piano (13)
- Subroza – bass, guitar (13)
- Anthony Clemons Jr. – additional vocals (16)
- Benjamin McIldowie – additional vocals (17)

Technical

- DJ Riggins – mastering, mixing
- Aesha Dominguez – recording (1–12, 14–17)
- Vic Mensa – recording (2–5, 7–11, 18)
- Rafe Noonan – recording (9)
- Rapsody – recording (13)
- Tyrone Griffin Jr. – recording (18)
