= Parts (OHMME album) =

Studio album by Ohmme
- Released: August 24, 2018
- Genre: Experimental pop
- Length: 38:14
- Label: Joyful Noise

Ohmme chronology
S/T (2017)	Parts (2018)	Fantasize Your Ghost (2020)

Professional ratings
Aggregate scores
Source	Rating
AnyDecentMusic?	7.2/10
Metacritic	79/100
Review scores
Source	Rating
The 405	8/10
AllMusic	4/5 stars
Pitchfork	7.6/10
PopMatters	7/10

Parts is the debut studio album by American band OHMME. It was released on August 24, 2018, through Joyful Noise Records.

== Track listing ==
No.	Title	Length
1.	"Icon"	3:17
2.	"Grandmother"	5:17
3.	"Parts"	5:00
4.	"Water"	2:30
5.	"Liquor Cabinet"	3:50
6.	"Peach"	2:54
7.	"Sentient Beings"	5:28
8.	"Left Handed"	4:30
9.	"Walk Me"	5:28
