= Finom =

American rock band

- Also known as: OHMME, Homme
- Origin: Chicago, Illinois, U.S.
- Genres: Indie rock; folk; improvisation; avant garde; jazz; blues; noise; pop
- Years active: 2014–present
- Labels: Joyful Noise
- Members: Sima Cunningham; Macie Stewart
- Website: www.finommusic.com

Finom (formerly known as OHMME, and Homme) is a rock band from Chicago formed by singer-songwriter and multi-instrumentalist duo Sima Cunningham and Macie Stewart in 2014.

== Background ==
Both Cunningham and Stewart attended Whitney Young Magnet High School on the city's near west side. While Macie Stewart was in high school, she played keyboards and sang in Kids These Days. Adding electric guitar, Stewart co-founded Marrow with Cunningham's brother, Liam Cunningham (a.k.a. Liam Kazar), in 2013 after Kids These Days disbanded. As of 2020, Stewart also plays violin and keyboards, and sings, in Chicago's avant-garde jazz ("improvised music"/free improvisation) community, including as a member of Marker, led by Ken Vandermark. Cunningham sang with the Chicago Children's Choir, and performed in the band The Audians while in high school. Since 2008, Cunningham has played and sung in bands, toured and recorded as a backup singer, worked on solo projects, and curated music festivals.

Both Sima Cunningham and Macie Stewart have released solo albums. From 2017 through 2020, Cunningham and Stewart—often along with Ken Vandermark, Anton Hatwich, Isaiah Spencer, and Cunningham's brother Liam Kazar (Cunningham)—usually participated in the annual winter performances in Chicago of the Yes We Can Band led by Jeff Albert and Steve Marquette, which covers New Orleans rhythm & blues/funk tunes, particularly those of Allen Toussaint and the Meters. As of 2021–2022, Cunningham, her brother Liam Kazar (Cunningham), and others frequently join Andrew Sa's Cosmic Country Showcase band in Chicago and Milwaukee, Wisconsin.

== History ==
According to Cunningham, OHMME/Finom started because "we knew we could sing well together, and we wanted to make some noise with the guitar." Both artists are trained as classical pianists and were familiar with the scope of sonic spaces keyboards had to offer but, according to Stewart, "since we were interested in experimenting and creating something different from what we had both done in the past, we chose guitar as our outlet for this band. We wanted to create parameters for ourselves that were both new and uncomfortable to force ourselves into a different creative space”.

OHMME/Finom have been touring both nationally and internationally since January 2016, including playing Pitchfork Music Festival in 2016. They have toured with Jeff Tweedy of Wilco, Iron & Wine, The Joy Formidable, Tortoise, and The Ophelias. In 2016, OHMME added, for live performances, drummer Matt Carroll, who had also worked with Cunningham and Stewart in the band Marrow.

OHMME released their first single on November 13, 2015, a self-titled EP in 2017, and two full-length albums: Parts in 2018 and Fantasize Your Ghost in 2020. OHMME have vocal and instrumental credits on projects of other musicians, including Chance the Rapper, Thor Harris, Richard Thompson, Twin Peaks, Ken Vandermark, V.V. Lightbody (Vivian McConnell), and Whitney.

Noisey dubbed OHMME "the band at the heart of Chicago's music community." After OHMME played a Tiny Desk Concert spot for NPR, Bob Boilen (TDC curator and producer of All Songs Considered) remarked that it was among the best performances of the series.

Fantasize Your Ghost, OHMME's second full-length album, was released on June 5, 2020 by Joyful Noise Recordings. In October 2020, OHMME released a concert film of the Fantasize Your Ghost material, plus two songs from a new single, with additional musicians Nnamdï Ogbonnaya (drums), Ruby Parker and Quinn Tsan (backing vocals), and V.V. Lightbody (backing vocals and flute), but without Matt Carroll; the film was recorded at and subsequently livestreamed (via YouTube) from Constellation in Chicago.

In December 2021 in Chicago, Cunningham, Stewart, and Alex Grelle inaugurated "Full Bush", a theatrical tribute to Kate Bush, written by Grelle and Jesse Morgan Young.

By late 2021, OHMME had expanded its touring band. In 2021, 2023, and 2024 performances, the duo were accompanied by Spencer Tweedy on drums and V. V. Lightbody on guitar, flute, and bass, but without Matt Carroll.

The duo announced in August 2022 that they had changed their name from OHMME to Finom, for legal reasons, and that they would embark on a nine-date tour of the eastern United States the following month. On October 16, 2023, Finom re-released their debut album, titled OHMME. As of 2024 and 2025, Finom continue to tour and to perform locally in the Chicago area, sometimes with a full band and sometimes as a duo.

== Equipment ==
In interviews, Cunningham and Stewart have described some of the musical equipment that they use, especially Stratocaster guitars and various pedals. As of 2019, Stewart often uses an Electro-Harmonix Octave Multiplexer pedal to substitute for a bass guitar.

== Band members ==
- Sima Cunningham – vocals, guitar
- Macie Stewart – vocals, guitar, violin, bass

Live-performance musicians

- Matt Carroll – drums (2016–2020)
- Spencer Tweedy – drums (2021–present)
- V.V. Lightbody (Vivian McConnell) - bass, guitar, vocals (2020–present)

== Discography ==
=== Albums ===
- Parts (Joyful Noise Recordings, 2018)
- Fantasize Your Ghost (Joyful Noise Recordings, 2020)
- OHMME (Joyful Noise Recordings, 2023)
- Not God (Joyful Noise Recordings, 2024)

=== EPs ===
- S/T, a.k.a. OHMME (Fox Hall Records/Overcoat Recordings, 2017)
- OHMME + The Aubreys ("split": 2 songs each by the 2 bands, self-released, 2020)

=== Singles ===
- "Furniture" (2015)
- "Wheel" (Overcoat Recordings, 2017); also self-released on split single with Poliça: Crate Diggers in Chicago (2017)
- "Fingerprints" (2017)
- "Woman" (2017)
- "Icon" (2018)
- "At Night" b/w "Gimme Back My Man" (Joyful Noise Recordings, 2019)
- "Mine" b/w "Miasma" (Sub Pop, 2020)
- "Girl Loves Me" (written by David Bowie) b/w "Some Kind of Calm" (Kahiem Rivera remix) (Joyful Noise Recordings via bandcamp, digital only, 2021)

=== Multiple-artist compilations ===
- "Homicidal Hamsters" on Safe In Sound (Home Recordings From Quarantine) (Joyful Noise Recordings, 2020)
