= U Mad =

Single by Vic Mensa featuring Kanye West
- Released: April 20, 2015
- Genre: Hip-hop
- Length: 4:59
- Label: Roc Nation; Def Jam
- Songwriters: Victor Mensah; Kanye West; Darian Garcia; Mike Dean; Ernest Brown; Stefan Ponce
- Producers: Smoko Ono; West (co.); Dean (co.); Ponce (co.); Charlie Heat (add.)

Vic Mensa singles chronology
"Down on My Luck" (2014)	"U Mad" (2015)	"Have U Eva" (2015)

Kanye West singles chronology
"All Day" (2015)	"U Mad" (2015)	"One Man Can Change the World" (2015)

"U Mad" is a single by American rap artist Vic Mensa, featuring fellow Chicago-based rapper Kanye West. It was released on April 20, 2015, as a non-album single.

== Background ==
On April 9, 2015, a recording was uploaded online of West's verse on the song.

== Composition ==
The vocals "South, south, south side!" by West in "U Mad" were sampled from his 2015 single "All Day", released over a month prior.

== Critical reception ==
Rolling Stone praised the featured rapper's part of the song, writing: "West drags out the ends of his sentences during his self-deprecating verse, making for a more mellow tone against the aggressive beat reminiscent of West's 'All Day.'".

== Music video ==
On June 9, 2015, a music video was officially released for the track.

== Commercial performance ==
The single only charted on the week it was released, reaching number 6 on the US Billboard Bubbling Under R&B/Hip-Hop Singles chart.

== Charts ==
Chart (2015)	Peak position
US Bubbling Under R&B/Hip-Hop Singles (Billboard)	6

== Certifications ==
Region	Certification	Certified units/sales
United States (RIAA)	Gold	500,000^{‡}
^{‡} Sales+streaming figures based on certification alone.

== Release history ==
Region	Date	Format	Label	Ref.
Various	April 20, 2015	Digital download	Roc Nation; Def Jam	
