= Knox Fortune =

American singer and record producer

- Born: Kevin Rhomberg; August 12, 1992 (age 33); Chicago, Illinois, U.S.
- Genres: Hip hop; pop
- Occupations: Singer; record producer
- Years active: 2012–present
- Website: www.knoxfortune.com

Kevin Rhomberg (born August 12, 1992), better known by his stage name Knox Fortune, is an American singer and record producer from Chicago, Illinois. He provided a guest vocal on Chance the Rapper's Coloring Book track "All Night".

== Early life ==
Born Kevin Rhomberg in Chicago, Illinois, Knox Fortune grew up in the Western suburb of Oak Park, Illinois. He took piano lessons when he was young. He graduated from Oak Park and River Forest High School. Afterwards, he took classes at Triton College.

== Career ==
Knox Fortune has collaborated with Joey Purp, Kami, Towkio, Vic Mensa, and Chance the Rapper. His debut solo studio album, Paradise, was released in 2017.

== Style and influences ==
In 2017, Dan Hyman of Rolling Stone described Knox Fortune as "a key sonic architect of the contemporary Chicago hip-hop scene." In a 2017 interview with Billboard, Knox Fortune stated that he was inspired by skateboarding, as well as the Beach Boys, Kanye West, J Dilla, the Neptunes, and the Beatles.

== Discography ==
=== Studio albums ===
- Paradise (2017)
- Stock Child Wonder (2020)

=== Singles ===
- "Help Myself" (2017)
- "Torture" (2017)
- "Lil Thing" (2017)
- "24 Hours" (2017)
- "Shirtless" (2020)

=== Guest appearances ===
- Sterling Hayes - "Mathematics" from Antidepressant (2016)
- Chance the Rapper - "All Night" from Coloring Book (2016)
- Kami - "The Both of Us" and "Just Like the Movies" from Just Like the Movies (2017)
- Chance the Rapper - "Let's Go on the Run" from The Big Day (2019)
- Intellexual - "Roxstar" from Intellexual (2019)
