= Olalekan Sipasi =

Nigerian entrepreneur

- Born: 9 September 1987 (age 38)
- Other name: Ayodele
- Education: Federal University of Technology, Akure; University of Ibadan; Pan-African University, Lagos; Kansas State University
- Awards: United States Consular General's Award. The Nigerian-American Partnership award. President Barack Obama's Young African Leaders Initiative Ambassador to Nigeria, 2013

Olalekan Sipasi (born 9 September 1987) is a Nigerian farmer, entrepreneur and community development rooter with a focus on Sustainable agriculture practice.

== Education ==
Olalekan Sipasi received a bachelor's degree in Animal Production and Health from the Federal University of Technology, Akure and a master's in Animal science from the University of Ibadan. He holds a certificate in Business administration from African Management Institute, Nairobi, Kenya and Enterprise Development Centre of the Pan-African University, Lagos, Nigeria.

Sipasi is Currently a PhD student and a Graduate research assistant at the department of Horticulture and Natural Resources at Kansas State University.

== Establishments ==
=== ProtectOzone ===
ProtectOzone is a Nonprofit organization that was Co-founded by Olalekan Sipasi and Olayanju Folasayo in 2015 in Nigeria to set in motion citizen awareness in protecting the ozone layer, and train indigent children, women, farmers and youths in sustainable agricultural practices to improve their living subsistence.

This initiative came as a result of Sipasi trip to Tanzania in 2015 and his encounter with South Sudanese, United Nations Volunteers - Dr Hussien I M Shagar. Who told him for the first time in his life about voluntary service. This later fired-up his interest of what he could do to help his country.

Prior to setting up ProtectOzone, Sipasi had volunteered and still in the act of volunteering with different NGOs. Notable among them are: Food4All Ghana, Education Concern for Hunger Organization (East and West Africa), ONE in Africa, Voluntary Service Overseas Nigeria, etc.

=== L'Afrika Integrated Farms ===
As a result of his father losing faith in his success, Sipasi established L'Affrika Integrated Farms in 2011 to cater for his needs. The farm uses herbal amino acids alternatives, an application centred around his final year project. The attention of AMPION Venture Bus of Germany was drawn to the idea and he was shortlisted to make a pitch involving five West African countries.

=== Mobile Kitchen ===
Sipasi initiated the Mobile Kitchen Garden, where he used environmental harmful waste materials to nurture food. Fortunately for him, the innovation brought him the 2015 Hidden Eco-hero Award, Samsung Engineering's Tunza Eco-generation, Seoul, South Korea.

== Works ==
Sipasi worked under the Office of the Vice President of Nigeria on the National Livestock Transformation Plan and National Home-Grown School Feeding Program as an N-Power Agro volunteer.

Sipasi is currently working on United States Consulate sponsored project (Farming for Empowerment & Entrepreneurship Development) where he trains local youths from the rural parts of Lagos on Sustainable Smart urban Agriculture to improve their living conditions.

He is the Country Coordinator of African Youth Employment Initiatives, Nigeria. And also coordinator of National Youth Service Corps, Social Development Goals.

== Global engagement ==
Sipasi has spoken in numerous conferences on both local and international platforms on youth's participation in agriculture.

On 24 April, Sipasi joined other 90 G20 youths in Germany to develop and amend the Berlin Charter on "Creating Opportunities with the Young Generation in the Rural world" He was chosen as part of 30 African Change makers in the Agricultural sector.

== Membership ==
Sipasi is member of the Global Shaper of the World Economic Forum, and holds a fellowship position of the following bodies:

- Fellow Thinking School Africa 2016.
- Carrington Fellow 2017.
- Full African Fellow of StartingBloc Institute 2018.
- Fellow of the Social Innovators Fellowship of LEAP Africa.
- Mandela Washington Fellowship for Young African Leaders.

== Awards ==
Sipasi is a recipient of the following awards: United States Consular General's Award; The Nigerian-American Partnership award; President Barack Obama's Young African Leaders Initiative Ambassador to Nigeria, 2013; Hidden Eco-hero Award 2015, Samsung Engineering's Tunza Eco-generation, Seoul, South Korea; Top 10 Go Green in the City Ambassador of the Schneider Electric, 2016; Lion's Awards, as the most influential participant of Obama's Young African Leaders Initiative (YALI), West Africa Cohort 3, West Africa Centre for Cooperate Social Responsibility; Africa Youth Award for Agriculture; Civil Society Award for Sustainable Environment, 2017; ONE Champion 2017; Africa LEADGo Green in the city; Social Innovators Program & Award SIPA, LEAP Africa.
