= The Manuscript (Vic Mensa EP) =

EP by Vic Mensa
- Released: June 8, 2017
- Genre: Hip hop
- Length: 15:54
- Labels: Roc Nation; Capitol
- Producers: Marcos Palacios; Mike Dean; No I.D.; Om'Mas Keith; Pharrell Williams; Rance

Vic Mensa chronology
| There's Alot Going On (2016) | The Manuscript (2017) | The Autobiography (2017) |

Professional ratings
Review scores
| Source | Rating |
|---|---|
| HipHopDX | 3.8/5 |

The Manuscript is the third extended play (EP) by American rapper Vic Mensa. It was released on June 8, 2017, by Roc Nation and Capitol Records. The EP features guest appearances from Mr. Hudson and Pusha T. All songs excluding "Almost There" featuring Mr Hudson were later included in The Autobiography, released subsequently shortly after The Manuscript on July 28, 2017.

== Track listing ==
Credits adapted from Tidal.

The Manuscript
| No. | Title | Writer(s) | Producer(s) | Length |
|---|---|---|---|---|
| 1. | "Almost There" (featuring Mr Hudson) | Victor Mensah; Ernest Wilson; Malik Jones; Benjamin Mclldowie; Thomas Barrett | No I.D. | 3:27 |
| 2. | "OMG" (featuring Pusha T) | Mensah; Terrence Thornton; Pharrell Williams; Jones | Williams | 3:50 |
| 3. | "Rollin' Like a Stoner" | Mensah; Wilson; Mike Dean; Larrance Dopson; Marcos Palacios | Rance; No I.D.; Dean; Palacios^{[b]} | 3:15 |
| 4. | "Rage" | Mensah; Dean; Om'Mas Keith | Dean; Keith^{[a]} | 5:19 |
| Total length: | | | | 15:54 |

Notes

- ^{^[a]} signifies a co-producer.
- ^{^[b]} signifies an additional producer.
- "Almost There" contains elements from "These are the Words" performed by Pastor T.L. Barrett.

== Charts ==
| Chart (2017) | Peak position |
|---|---|
| US Heatseekers Albums (Billboard) | 25 |
