= Kami (rapper) =

American rapper (born 1994)

KAMI
- Also known as: Kami de Chukwu
- Born: Kene Ekwunife; January 5, 1994 (age 32)
- Origin: Chicago, Illinois
- Genres: Hip hop
- Occupation: Rapper
- Years active: 2012–present
- Website: www.survivetheflood.us

Kene Ekwunife (born January 5, 1993), better known by his stage names Kami (sometimes stylized as KAMI) and Kami de Chukwu, is an American rapper from Chicago, Illinois. He is one half of Leather Corduroys. He is one of the founding members of Savemoney. He was included on RedEye's "5 Chicago acts to watch in 2017" list, as well as Fact's "10 rappers to watch in 2018" list.

== Career ==
In 2012, Kami released his debut mixtape, Light. In 2017, he released Just Like the Movies, which featured guest appearances from Vic Mensa, Towkio, and Joey Purp. It was described by Noisey as "the fascinating extension of rap's current druggy, emotive melodicism into the more extreme sonic possibilities". In that year, he also released an EP, Superstar. In 2018, he released an EP, From Me to You, as well as a collaborative EP with Smoko Ono, titled Very Slight.

Leather Corduroys has released two projects together: Porno Music Vol. 2 (2014) and Season (2015). Season received a 6.8 rating from Pitchfork.

== Discography ==
=== Albums ===
- Just Like the Movies (2017)

=== Mixtapes ===
- Light (2012) (as Kami de Chukwu)

=== EPs ===
- Superstar (2017)
- From Me to You (2018)
- Very Slight (2018) (with Smoko Ono)

=== Singles ===
- "Home Movies" (2016)
- "Foundation" (2016)
- "Right Now" (2016)
- "Scene Girl" (2017)
- "Reboot" (2018)
- "Go Gentle" (2023) (with femdot & Holly)
