= Towkio =

American rapper

- Also known as: Young P; Preston San; Tokyo Shawn; Pizza-kun
- Born: Preston Oshita; June 26, 1993 (age 33); Chicago, Illinois, U.S.
- Genres: Hip hop
- Occupation: Rapper
- Years active: 2012–present
- Label: Republic Records
- Website: www.towk.io

Preston Oshita (born June 26, 1993), better known by his stage name Towkio, is an American rapper from Chicago, Illinois. He was previously known as Young P, Preston San, and Tokyo Shawn. He is a member of the Savemoney crew. His debut studio album, WWW., was released in 2018.

== Early life ==
On June 26, 1993, Towkio was born Preston Oshita in Chicago, Illinois to a Mexican mother and a Japanese father. He has two older brothers. He attended Lane Tech College Prep High School.

== Career ==
In 2012, Towkio released a collaborative EP with producer Mojek, titled Community Service. In 2014, he released another EP, titled Hot Chips n Chop Stix, which was produced by A Billion Young.

In 2015, Towkio released a mixtape, titled .Wav Theory, which featured contributions from Chance the Rapper, Vic Mensa, Kaytranada, and Donnie Trumpet. It was included on year-end lists by publications such as Complex, Chicago Tribune, and RedEye. He was included on HipHopDX's "Top 8 Rising Stars of 2015" list. In 2016, Towkio was featured alongside Justin Bieber on Chance the Rapper's song, "Juke Jam", from his third mixtape, Coloring Book. That same year, he released an EP, titled Community Service 2.

In 2018, Towkio released his debut studio album, titled WWW., which included the previously released singles, namely "Drift", "Hot Shit", "Swim", "Symphony", and "2 Da Moon". It included guest appearances from Teddy Jackson, Grace Weber, SZA, Vic Mensa, and Njomza.

== Style and influences ==
Towkio's musical style has been described by Chicago Tribune as "an adventurous mix of rap, '90s soul, jazz and generally weird, fuzzed-out beats." He cited Kanye West and Lil Wayne as his biggest influences.

== Controversy ==
In January 2019, Towkio was accused by a woman of sexual assault on Twitter. He denied the allegations, stating that they "were in an ongoing consensual sexual relationship dating back to 2014 which even included other women." He added, "It is my hope that her and I can engage in a dialogue in a place where she feels comfortable to discuss our past relationship and her feelings."

== Discography ==
=== Studio albums ===
- WWW. (2018)
- Stimuli (2026)

=== Mixtapes ===
- .Wav Theory (2015)
- Community Service 3!!! (2023)

=== EPs ===
- Community Service (2012) (with Mojek)
- Hot Chips n Chop Stix (2014)
- Community Service 2 (2016)

=== Singles ===
- "Drift" (2017)
- "Hot Shit" (2017)
- "Swim" (2017)
- "Symphony" (2018)
- "2 Da Moon" (2018)
- "Billi" (2019)
- "Too Many Times" (2020)

=== Other charted songs ===
Featured song, showing year released and album name
Title	Year	Peak chart positions		Certifications	Album
Title	Year	US Bub.	US R&B/HH	Certifications	Album
"Juke Jam" (Chance the Rapper featuring Justin Bieber and Towkio)	2016	5	48	RIAA: 2× Platinum; RMNZ: Gold	Coloring Book

=== Guest appearances ===
List of guest appearances, with other performing artists, showing year released and album name
Year	Title	Other artist(s)	Album
2012	"Scrapemoney"	Kami de Chukwu	Light
2013	"She's the Type"	Brian Fresco, Chance the Rapper, Kami de Chukwu, MC Tree	Mafioso
2013	"Steamer"	Brian Fresco, Chance the Rapper, Vic Mensa, Kami de Chukwu	Mafioso
2015	"Gettin Throwed"	Two Fresh, Joey Purp	—N/a
2016	"Juke Jam"	Chance the Rapper, Justin Bieber	Coloring Book
2016	"Purple Fox Fur"	TheMind, Donnie Trumpet, Sean Deaux	Summer Camp
2017	"Just Like the Movies"	Kami, Joey Purp, Knox Fortune, Vic Mensa	Just Like the Movies
2018	"Sneakerhead"	Lido, J'von	Spacesuit
