= Joey Purp =

American rapper (born 1993)

- Born: Joseph Davis; August 3, 1993 (age 33); Chicago, Illinois, U.S.
- Genre: Hip-hop
- Occupation: Rapper
- Years active: 2012–present
- Website: purp.international

Joseph Davis (born August 3, 1993), better known by his stage name Joey Purp, is an American rapper. He is one half of Leather Corduroys. He is one of the founding members of Savemoney.

== Early life ==
Joseph Davis grew up bouncing between various neighborhoods of Chicago, ranging from Wrigleyville to Humboldt Park. His father ran a restaurant and his mother managed thrift stores. He attended Whitney Young High School, where he realized that he had a talent for freestyle rapping. In his senior year, he flunked out of high school. He worked and interned at LDRS 1354, a streetwear store at Wicker Park.

== Career ==
In 2012, Joey Purp released his first mixtape, The Purple Tape. In 2016, he released a mixtape, iiiDrops. Tentatively titled Eyedrops, it featured contributions from Chance the Rapper and Vic Mensa, among others. It was included on the year-end lists by Complex, Pitchfork, Rolling Stone, and Lyrical Lemonade.

In 2018, Joey Purp released his debut studio album, Quarterthing. It included guest appearances from GZA and RZA, among others.

In 2023, Joey Purp's song "Elastic" was used in Google's Chromebook advertisements.

== Style and influences ==
Joey Purp grew up listening to Wu-Tang Clan, Sex Pistols, The Casualties, The Velvet Underground, Lou Reed, Dipset, and Lil Wayne. In a 2014 interview, he stated that his early recordings were heavily inspired by Currensy.

== Discography ==
=== Studio albums ===
- Quarterthing (2018)
- Heavy Heart, Vol. 1 (2023)

=== Collaborative albums ===
- YOU AND THE MONEY (with KAMI) (2022)
- Champagne Seats (with Thelonious Martin) (2025)

=== Mixtapes ===
- The Purple Tape (2012)
- iiiDrops (2016)

=== Extended plays ===
- ALASKA (2025)

=== Singles ===
==== As lead artist ====
- "Don't Stop" (2013)
- "Morgan Freeman" (2015)
- "Run It Up" (2015)
- "Performance Art Freestyle" (2016)
- "Girls @" (2016)
- "March 12th" (2018)
- "Bag Talk" (2018)
- "Elastic" (2018)

==== As featured artist ====
- "Winners" (2021)
  (Smoko Ono featuring Yxng Bane, Chance the Rapper & Joey Purp)

=== Guest appearances ===
- Vic Mensa - "Fear & Doubt" from Innanetape (2013)
- Thelonious Martin - "Purp Interlude" and "Purp Outro" from Wünderkid (2014)
- Donnie Trumpet & The Social Experiment - "Go" from Surf (2015)
- Two Fresh - "Still Got It" from Torch (2015)
- Sterling Hayes - "OTS" from Antidepressant (2016)
- Thelonius Martin - "Bomaye" (2016)
- Towkio - "Playin' Fair" from Community Service 2 (2016)
- OddCouple - "Visions" from Liberation (2016)
- Phantogram - "You Don't Get Me High Anymore (A-Trak Remix)" (2017)
- ZZ Ward - "The Deep" (2017)
- Kami - "Just Like the Movies" from Just Like the Movies (2017)
- Vic Mensa - "Down for Some Ignorance (Ghetto Lullaby)" from The Autobiography (2017)
- Tokimonsta - "No Way" from Lune Rouge (2017)
- Knox Fortune - "Stun" from Paradise (2017)
- Louis the Child - "Shake Something" (2018)
- Kami & Smoko Ono - "Reboot" and "Beware" from Very Slight (2018)
- Chance the Rapper - "My Own Thing" (2018)
