= Savemoney =

American hip hop group

- Origin: Chicago, Illinois, U.S.
- Genre: Hip hop
- Years active: 2008–present
- Spinoffs: Kids These Days; The Social Experiment
- Members: Vic Mensa; Chance the Rapper; Nico Segal; Towkio; Joey Purp; Kami; Brian Fresco; Dally Auston; Caleb James; Sterling Hayes
- Website: www.savemoneyarmy.weebly.com

Savemoney (sometimes stylized as SaveMoney or SAVEMONEY) is a hip hop collective originating in Chicago, Illinois, based in the United States of America. It was founded by Chicago rapper Vic Mensa in 2008, and includes Mensa alongside Chance the Rapper and Nico Segal, formerly known as Donnie Trumpet.

The group is associated with Segal's Kids These Days, which also includes Mensa, alongside another Segal-fronted project, the Social Experiment, which also includes Chance. The latter associated group released their debut studio album, Surf, on the 28th of May, 2015, with Kids These Days releasing three projects (Hard Times EP in 2011, Traphouse Cuts in September 2012, and Traphouse Rock in October 2012) before breaking up in 2013. Vic Mensa would also found the SavemoneySavelife Foundation, partially named after the group.

== Members ==
- Vic Mensa
- Chance the Rapper
- Nico Segal
- Towkio
- Joey Purp
- Kami
- Brian Fresco
- Dally Auston
- Caleb James
- Sterling Hayes
