= Down on My Luck =

Single by Vic Mensa
- Released: June 6, 2014
- Recorded: 2014
- Genre: Hip-hop; deep house; hip house
- Length: 3:29
- Label: Virgin EMI
- Songwriters: Peter Cottontale; Ommas Keith-Graham; Vic Mensah; Cameron Osteen; Stefan Ponce
- Producers: Vic Mensa; Stefan Ponce

Vic Mensa singles chronology
"Down on My Luck" (2014)	"U Mad" (2015)

"Down on My Luck" is a song by American rapper Vic Mensa. It was released on June 6, 2014, by Virgin EMI Records, as his debut single. The song was written by Mensa alongside Om'Mas Keith, Cam O'bi, Peter Cottontale, and Stephen Ponce. The song's production was handled by Mensa himself and Ponce. The song went on and charted at number 37 on the UK Singles Chart.

== Critical reception ==
Complex named "Down on My Luck" the fifteenth best song of the first half of 2014. Their writer Insanul Ahmed said, "Bolstered by its Groundhog's Day-style music video, the song might feel like a blatant attempt by a rappity rapper to make a dance song to get on the charts. But when you consider Vic's Chicago roots, the house beat makes a lot more sense. Plus, as fans of Vic's INNANETAPE know, he's all about mixing and merging sounds and styles. So even if "Down on My Luck" doesn't feature much rapping, it still somehow plays into Vic's strengths." Renato Pagnani of Pitchfork stated, "it's the restlessness of last year's Innanetape that helps contextualize "Down on My Luck" as a natural extension of Mensa's omnivorous musical appetite rather than a hard—and cynical—left turn. It also doesn't hurt that the track nails the propulsive throb of deep house and comes equipped with an earworm of a hook that suggests Mensa might have a career in him as a dance vocalist if this rapping thing doesn't pan out."

== Music video ==
The music video for "Down on My Luck" was released on May 12, 2014.

== Charts ==
Chart (2014)	Peak position
Australian Urban Singles Chart (ARIA)	16
UK Singles (OCC)	37
