= Kids These Days (band) =

American hip hop group

- Origin: Chicago, Illinois, U.S.
- Genres: Hip hop; blues; rock; soul
- Years active: 2009–2013
- Past members: Liam Cunnigham/Kazar; Lane Beckstrom; Greg Landfair; Finom; Vic Mensa; Nico Segal; J.P. Floyd; Rajiv Halim

Kids These Days was a hip hop band from Chicago, Illinois. The band formed in 2009 while the members were teenagers and their debut album Traphouse Rock was released in 2012. Their split in May 2013 served as a launch pad for Vic Mensa and Donnie Trumpet & The Social Experiment, among others.

== History ==
In November 2009, the band won first place at Congress Theater’s Next Big Thing competition. In 2011, the band performed at South by Southwest, at Milwaukee's Summerfest on July 1, at Lollapalooza, and at The Roots Picnic started and hosted by The Roots on June 2. On June 13, 2012, the band performed on Conan O'Brien's TV show, Conan, at The Chicago Theatre.

During the Fall 2012 Chicago Teachers Union strike, Kids These Days performed at the union's Solidarity Festival in Union Park.

Kids These Days 2012 debut, "Traphouse Rock," was produced by Wilco's Jeff Tweedy and mixed by Mario C.

In May 2013, Kids These Days decided to split up.

=== Beyond Kids These Days ===
Vic Mensa launched his own career and continued to pursue his musical talents. He worked on collaborative songs with rappers such as Chance the Rapper and Kanye West. He currently fronts the punk-rock project 93PUNX. Nico Segal, the horn player, also released two mixtapes, Illasoul: Shades of Blue and the Donnie Trumpet EP as Nico Segal and currently went on to perform in The Social Experiment with Greg Landfair Jr.

Lane Beckstrom went on to produce and record his own electronic music under the name Lane. His debut EP "Argot" was released on January 20, 2015. Rajiv Halim recently released his debut album Foundation in August 2015.

Three previous members of Kids These Days, Macie Stewart, Lane Beckstrom and Liam Cunningham, along with Matt Carroll, formed the band Marrow.

Macie Stewart formed the band OHMME, with Sima Cunningham, which remains active as of 2020. As of 2019, Stewart also plays violin and sings in Chicago's avant-garde jazz community, including as a member of Marker, led by Ken Vandermark.

Liam Kazar (Cunningham) backed the duo Tweedy on tour. In 2021, Kazar released a solo album; he was regularly performing in Chicago, including with his band.

== Members ==
- Liam Cunningham, a.k.a. Liam Kazar – lead vocals, guitar
- Macie Stewart – lead vocals, keyboards
- Vic Mensa – rap vocals
- Lane Beckstrom – bass
- Greg Landfair Jr. – drums
- Nico Segal – trumpet
- J.P. Floyd – trombone
- Rajiv Halim – saxophone

== Discography ==
=== Albums ===
- Hard Times EP (2011)
- Traphouse Rock (October 2012)
- Traphouse Cuts (September 2012)
