= Baby Faced Killer =

Studio album by David Byron
- Released: 1978
- Recorded: 1978
- Studio: The Old Smithy (Worcester); Lansdowne Studios (London)
- Genre: Rock
- Label: Arista
- Producer: David Byron; Daniel Boone

David Byron chronology
Take No Prisoners (1975)	Baby Faced Killer (1978)	On the Rocks (1981)

Professional ratings
Review scores
Source	Rating
Allmusic	3/5 stars

Baby Faced Killer is the second solo album of British rock singer David Byron. It was his first since being sacked by Uriah Heep.

== Track listing ==
All tracks by Daniel Boone and David Byron.

1. "Baby Faced Killer" – 3:10
2. "Rich Man's Lady" – 3:51
3. "Sleepless Nights" – 3:48
4. "African Breeze" – 4:12
5. "Everybody's Star" – 4:20
6. "Heaven Or Hell" – 4:42
7. "Only You Can Do It" – 4:04
8. "Don't Let Me Down" – 3:21
9. "Acetylene Jean" – 3:19
10. "I Remember" – 4:08

Additional tracks not included on release

1. "Down On My Luck" – 2:51 / B-side of "African Breeze" single
2. "All in Your Mind" – 2:52 / B-side of "Rich Man's Lady" single

== Personnel ==
- David Byron - lead vocals
- Stuart Elliott - drums
- Alan Jones - bass
- Daniel Boone - guitars, keyboards, percussion
- Barry Desouza - drums
- Lester Fry - timpanis, chimes
- Mick Box appears as a guest lead guitarist on 'I Remember'
- Lelly Boone, Gabriele Byron, Alyson Mcinness, Muff Murfin, Brad Davies - backing vocals

Technical

- Arranged & Produced by - David Byron and Daniel Boone (by Courtesy of Boone Productions Ltd.)
- Engineered by - Brad Davies (The Old Smithy) & David Baker (Lansdowne)
- Mixed at Berwick Street Studios by Brad Davies, "Sleepless Nights" remixed at Lansdowne by David Baker
- Mastered by - George Marino (Sterling Sound, NY)
