= Andrew Sa =

American singer-songwriter

- Born: Bay area, Fremont, California
- Citizenship: American
- Occupations: Singer; Songwriter
- Years active: 2013 - Present

Andrew Sa is an American country singer-songwriter who was born in the Bay Area before moving to Chicago. There, Sa furthered his education and took classes at the Old Town School of Folk Music. In 2026, he released his debut album, American Rough, a country album that explores themes of love, longing, and masculinity.

== Early life ==
Sa moved from the Bay Area to Portland, Oregon and later to Chicago where he has been living since 2009. His earliest memories of music include listening to artists such as the Eagles, Reba McEntire, Patsy Cline, Roy Orbison, and contemporary country hits while riding in his father's Ford F150 and his grandparents' Lincoln Town Car. His parents later divorced, and after his mother remarried, she started a karaoke company, further exposing Sa to music and performance from an early age.

== Career ==
Sa began his career as an actor, working in both film and theatre. From 2013 to 2016, he performed at queer-focused events, combining his artistic interests with his emerging understanding of his identity. He cites artists such as Ella Fitzgerald, Billie Holiday, Nat King Cole, and Frank Sinatra as important influences on his musical career. As he came to terms with his identity, openly queer artists including Elton John, Rufus Wainwright, and k.d. lang also became significant sources of inspiration.

Sa began working at the front desk at the Old Town School of Folk Music in 2013, where he also started receiving bookings for performances. In 2021, he released his debut EP, Cosmic Country Stars and in 2026, he released his debut album.

== Personal life ==
He identifies as a gay man and is engaged to his fiancé, Jacob Strayer. They have been together for more than 12 years.

== Discography ==
- American Rough (2026)

== Filmography ==
- Andrew in Anotherland
