= Innanetape =

INNANETAPE

Mixtape by Vic Mensa
- Released: September 30, 2013
- Recorded: 2013; Chicago
- Studios: Truth Studios, Los Angeles
- Genres: Hip-hop; psychedelic
- Length: 52:55
- Label: Closed Sessions
- Producers: Vic Mensa (also exec.); Peter Cottontale (also exec.); Cam O'bi (also exec.); Om'Mas Keith (also exec.); Boi-1da; Hit-Boy; Tae Beast; DJ Dahi; The Maven Boys; Michael Uzowuru; Christian Rich

Vic Mensa chronology
Straight Up (2010)	INNANETAPE (2013)	There's Alot Going On (2016)

Innanetape (stylized as INNANETAPE) is the debut mixtape by the American rapper Vic Mensa. It was released on September 30, 2013, as a free download. The mixtape features guest appearances from Chance the Rapper, Ab-Soul, Rockie Fresh and BJ the Chicago Kid, as well as the production that was provided by Boi-1da, Hit-Boy, Cam for J.U.S.T.I.C.E. League, Tae Beast, DJ Dahi, Om'Mas Keith, Christian Rich and Mensa himself. The project was released to steaming platforms on September 30, 2026, after Vic Mensa signed with UnitedMasters.

== Background ==
Vic Mensa told MTV; the inspiration for the mixtape came from him "tweakin' one night with a lot of friends at his homegirl's house." The following day he began recording material for mixtape, already had chosen the title Innanetape. The title is a combination of the words "internet" and "mixtape".

On August 30, 2013, Vic Mensa released a trailer for the mixtape parodying the beating of fellow Chicago rapper DJ Nate, who got robbed earlier in 2013. The video also revealed a September 30, 2013, release date for the mixtape. The mixtape featured guest appearances by Chance the Rapper, Ab-Soul, Rockie Fresh and BJ the Chicago Kid, along with production from Boi-1da, Hit-Boy, Tae Beast, DJ Dahi, the Maven Boys, Cam of J.U.S.T.I.C.E. League, Michael Uzowuru, Christian Rich, and Mensa himself. Following the mixtape's release, Mensa toured with J. Cole and Wale.

Vic Mensa announced a four-venue intimate show tour to celebrate the thirteenth anniversary of the original release and the streaming release.

== Critical response ==
Professional ratings
Review scores
Source	Rating
Exclaim!	7/10
XXL	4/5 (XL)

Christian Mordi of XXL gave the mixtape a "XL" rating, stating "Mensa provides lyrical nourishment throughout Innanetape. Mensa showcases his ability to stand alone and make strong songs early in the tape with the playful “Orange Soda” and soulful “Lovely Day.” Vic doesn't get lost in the mix when sparring with rising stars in the game like TDE's Ab-Soul or MMG’s Rockie Fresh. In regards to flow, Vic shows a keen ability to bend words at will, cramming syllables into lines with obvious glee." Steven Goldstein of HipHopDX deemed the mixtape a "free album", saying "There’s no ceiling on Vic Mensa’s crossover ability. Those who log on to his INNANET in search of diversion and socializing will be satisfied with the free form lyricism and upbeat tempo of the project’s first half, and those looking for something that runs deeper than the established culture will be thrilled with the latter half." Del F. Cowie of Exclaim! said, "On the evidence of Innanetape, Mensa (aka Yung Netscape) defies the defunct nature of his alter ego and is definitely still around for a reason, poised to realize his potential."

=== Year-end lists ===
Complex ranked the mixtape at number 34, on their list of the 50 best albums of 2013. They commented saying, "INNANETAPE displays Vic's talent in its fullest fruition yet. As a rapper, Vic is physical, contorting words and playing with sounds. He bends the meter of songs in unexpected ways and dances freely between rapping and singing his lyrics. He's fun to listen to, his writing is dizzyingly dense and consistently interesting. But INNANETAPE is more than a show of great rapping—it's also an ambitious, musically omnivorous project that demonstrates Vic is an artist with a broad vision and a strong sense for building songs." Rolling Stone named it the seventh best mixtape of 2013. They elaborated saying, "Though he and Chance share a delirious flow and a keen eye for both self and society, Mensa's Innanetape is a bright blast of summertime sunshine highlighted by paeans to orange soda ("Orange Soda"), drugs ("Tweakin"), and, well, life ("Lovely Day"). XXL named it the eighth best mixtape of 2013. They commented saying, "Vic Mensa proves that he can standout with INNANETAPE. [...] The once frontman for popular band Kids These Days, he turns solo and puts out an impressive tape reflecting his experiences and observations of the turmoil in the Windy City. He displays great voice control, lyrical prowess and song-making ability throughout the record."

== Track listing ==
INNANETAPE
No.	Title	Producer(s)	Length
1.	"Welcome to INNANET"	Vic Mensa; Cam O'bi^{[a]}; Peter Cottontale^{[a]}	3:38
2.	"Orange Soda"	Cam O'bi	3:40
3.	"Lovely Day"	Vic Mensa; Cottontale	4:18
4.	"Tweakin'" (featuring Chance the Rapper)	Michael Uzowuru	3:44
5.	"Fun!" (Interlude)		0:38
6.	"Magic" (featuring Jesse Boykins III)	Cottontale	4:01
7.	"Time Is Money" (featuring Rockie Fresh)	Boi-1da; The Maven Boys	4:57
8.	"YNSP" (featuring Eliza Doolittle)	DJ Dahi	4:36
9.	"Hollywood LA" (featuring Lili K.)	Cam O'bi; Tae Beast	4:04
10.	"Holy Holy" (featuring Ab-Soul and BJ the Chicago Kid)	Cam O'bi; Cottontale^{[a]}; Om'Mas Keith^{[a]}	4:58
11.	"Fear & Doubt" (featuring Joey Purp and Kenna)	Christian Rich	4:11
12.	"Yap Yap"	Uzowuru	2:45
13.	"RUN!" (featuring Thundercat)	Vic Mensa; Cottontale; Keith^{[a]}	3:30
14.	"That Nigga"	Hit-Boy	3:59

2026 streaming edition
No.	Title	Producer(s)	Length
15.	"Suitcase" (with Chance the Rapper)	Cam O'bi	2:20
16.	"Feel That"	Smoko Ono	2:42
Total length:			56:23

Notes

- ^{^[a]} signifies an additional producer

== Personnel ==
- Ab-Soul – featured artist (track 10)
- BJ the Chicago Kid – featured artist (track 10)
- Boi-1da – production (track 7)
- Jesse Boykins III – featured artist (track 6)
- Cam O'bi – additional production (track 1), production (tracks: 9, 10), executive production
- Chance the Rapper – featured artist (track 4)
- Christian Rich – production (track 11)
- Peter Cottontale – additional production (tracks: 1, 10), production (tracks: 3, 6, 13), executive production
- DJ Dahi – production (track 8)
- Eliza Doolittle – featured artist (track 8)
- Hit-Boy – production (track 14)
- Om'Mas Keith – additional production (tracks: 10, 13), executive production
- Mike Kolar – mixing (tracks: 3, 13)
- Joey Purp – featured artist (track 11)
- J.U.S.T.I.C.E. League – production (track 2)
- Kenna – featured artist (track 11)
- The Maven Boys – production (track 7)
- Papi Beatz – recording engineer (all tracks), mixing (tracks: 1, 2, 4–12, 14)
- Tae Beast – production (track 9)
- Thundercat – featured artist (track 13)
- Michael Uzowuru – production (tracks: 4, 12)
- Vic Mensa – production (tracks: 1, 3, 13), executive production

== Release history ==
Date	Format	Ref.
September 30, 2013	Download	
September 30, 2026	Streaming	
