= The Autobiography (Vic Mensa album) =

Studio album by Vic Mensa
- Released: July 28, 2017
- Genre: Hip-hop
- Length: 60:29
- Labels: Roc Nation; Capitol
- Producers: No I.D. (also exec.); Jay-Z (exec.); Vic Mensa (also exec.); Malik Yusef (co-exec.); Mike Dean; DJ Dahi; The-Dream; Om'Mas Keith; Marcos "Kosine" Palacios; Papi Beatz; Smoko Ono; Tricky Stewart; Pharrell Williams; 1500 or Nothin'

Vic Mensa chronology
The Manuscript (2017)	The Autobiography (2017)	Hooligans (2018)

Singles from The Autobiography
- 1. "Wings" Released: July 13, 2017

The Autobiography is the debut studio album by American rapper Vic Mensa. The album was released on July 28, 2017, by Roc Nation and Capitol Records. The album features guest appearances from Weezer, Syd, The-Dream, Chief Keef, Joey Purp, Pharrell Williams, Saul Williams, Ty Dolla Sign and Pusha T. The album was released for streaming, a week early from its release date via NPR.

== Background ==
On July 11, 2017, the release date for the album was revealed. On July 14, 2017, the album's cover art was released. Vic Mensa explained the concept behind The Autobiography during an interview with Rap-Up, saying:

"It’s a human album, It explores my humanity, mainly, and I leave that to the listener to make parallels to themselves. When I say that the album is my blood, sweat, and tears, and everything I’ve learned up to this point, it’s just because it literally is."

From a musical standpoint, Vic Mensa drew inspiration from 1990s hip-hop while making the album. He recruited No I.D. to executive produce the album. In an interview with Billboard, Mensa stated that No I.D. helped him "create a consolidated, concise body of work."

== Singles ==
The album's lead single "Wings" was released on July 13, 2017. Three tracks from the album, "Rollin Like a Stoner", "Rage" and "OMG" were previously released from his EP The Manuscript, which was a prelude to the album.

== Critical reception ==
Professional ratings
Aggregate scores
Source	Rating
Metacritic	71/100
Review scores
Source	Rating
AllMusic	4/5 stars
Clash	7/10
The Guardian	3/5 stars
HotNewHipHop	71%
NME	4/5 stars
Paste	7.5/10
Pitchfork	6.9/10
PopMatters	6/10 stars
Rolling Stone	3.5/5 stars
XXL	3/5 (L)

At Metacritic, which assigns a weighted average score out of 100 to reviews from mainstream critics, The Autobiography received an average score of 71 based on 12 reviews, indicating "generally favorable reviews".

Will Rosebury of Clash gave the album a 7 out of 10, saying, "Although the succession of lukewarm tracks early on prevents this from being a flawless debut, Vic Mensa does enough to keep the album an engaging listen even in its misguided moments." Jay Balfour of Pitchfork gave the album a 6.9 out of 10, saying, "Perhaps Mensa has been less urgent in developing his artistry, but The Autobiography gathers up all his charms, including his most compelling case as a genre-agnostic vocalist alongside some missed-the-mark rock crossovers."

Jordan Bassett of NME gave the album 4 stars out of 5 and called it "a scattershot album gelled together by Mensa's emotionally frank lyrics, which reveal a complex persona". Nastia Voynovskaya of Paste gave the album a 7.5 out of 10, saying, "Through Mensa's forthright confessions, The Autobiography inspires as much as it speaks to our inner angsty adolescents—the ones who used to hole up in their rooms and blast Linkin Park at night." Christopher Thiessen of PopMatters gave the album 6 stars out of 10, stating that "While it may not be his most innovative offering, detailed execution and honesty make it worthwhile."

On July 25, 2017, it was listed by Stereogum as their album of the week.

=== Accolades ===
Publication	Accolade	Rank	Ref.
ABC News	50 Best Albums of 2017	21	
Consequence of Sound	Top 50 Albums of 2017	38	
Rolling Stone	40 Best Rap Albums of 2017	36	

== Commercial performance ==
The Autobiography debuted at number 27 on the US Billboard 200, selling 15,977 copies in its first week.

== Track listing ==
The Autobiography
No.	Title	Writer(s)	Producer(s)	Length
1.	"Didn't I (Say I Didn't)"	Victor Mensah; Alex Baez; Darian Garcia; Carter Lang; Ernest Wilson; Jordan Asher; Malik Jones; William Pulliam; John Tanner; Tyron Griffin, Jr.	Smoko Ono; Papi Beatz; No I.D.; Vic Mensa^{[b]}; Lang^{[b]}	5:15
2.	"Memories on 47th St."	Mensah; Larrance Dopson; Wilson; Dacoury Natche; Jones	1500 or Nothin'; No I.D.; DJ Dahi	4:02
3.	"Rollin' Like a Stoner"	Mensah; Dopson; Wilson; Mike Dean; Marcos "Kosine" Palacios	1500 or Nothin'; No I.D.; Dean; Kosine^{[b]}	3:16
4.	"Homewrecker" (featuring Weezer)	Mensah; Wilson; Rivers Cuomo	Mensa; No I.D.	4:08
5.	"Gorgeous" (featuring Syd)	Mensah; Dopson; Wilson; Jones; Sydney Bennett	1500 or Nothin'; No I.D.	4:30
6.	"Heaven on Earth" (featuring The-Dream)	Mensah; Terius Nash; Wilson; Garcia; Jones; Andy Barlow; Lou Rhodes	Smoko Ono; Papi Beatz; No I.D.; Mensa	5:17
7.	"Card Cracker" (skit)	Keith Cozart; Tyree Pittman; Mensah; Edward Davis; Deon Cole	Mensa	1:10
8.	"Down for Some Ignorance (Ghetto Lullaby)" (featuring Chief Keef and Joey Purp)	Mensah; Dean; Wilson; Jones; Saul Williams; Cozart; Pittman	No I.D.; Dean; Mensa	4:25
9.	"Coffee & Cigarettes"	Mensah; Baez; Om'Mas Keith; Wilson	Papi Beatz; Keith; No I.D.	4:30
10.	"Wings" (featuring Pharrell Williams and Saul Williams)	Mensah; Jones; Pharrell Williams; S. Williams	P. Williams	4:03
11.	"Heaven on Earth" (reprise)	Nash; Christopher Stewart	The-Dream; Tricky Stewart	2:06
12.	"The Fire Next Time"	Mensah; Wilson; Jones; Thomas Lee Barrett	No I.D.	3:44
13.	"We Could Be Free" (featuring Ty Dolla $ign)	Mensah; Dopson; Jones; Glenda Proby; Griffin, Jr.	1500 or Nothin'	4:55
Total length:				51:19

Bonus tracks
No.	Title	Writer(s)	Producer(s)	Length
14.	"Rage"	Mensah; Dean; Keith	Dean; Keith^{[a]}	5:19
15.	"OMG" (featuring Pusha T)	Mensah; Terrence Thornton; P. Williams; Jones	P. Williams	3:50
Total length:				60:29

Notes

- ^{^[a]} signifies a co-producer
- ^{^[b]} signifies an additional producer
- "Memories on 47th St." features uncredited vocals by Mr Hudson
- "Heaven on Earth" features additional vocals by Dreezy
- "Card Cracker" skit is performed by Edward "Ugly Eddie" Davis and Deon Cole
- "Down for Some Ignorance (Ghetto Lullaby)" features additional vocals by Ellie "Kyiki" Fletcher
- "Wings" features additional vocals by Mekkel Carter
- "OMG" features uncredited vocals by Pharrell Williams

Sample credits

- "Didn't I (Say I Didn't)" contains elements from "Didn't I", written by William Pulliam and John Tanner, and performed by Darondo.
- "Homewrecker" contains elements from "The Good Life", written by Rivers Cuomo, and performed by Weezer.
- "Heaven on Earth" contains an interpolation of "Heaven", written by Andy Barlow and Lou Rhodes.
- "Card Cracker" contains elements from "Love Sosa", written by Keith Cozart and Tyree Pittman, and performed by Chief Keef.
- "Down for Some Ignorance (Ghetto Lullaby)" contains elements from "Down for Some Ignorance", written and performed by Saul Williams.
- "The Fire Next Time" contains elements from "Nobody Knows", written and performed by Pastor T.L. Barrett.

== Charts ==
Chart (2017)	Peak position
New Zealand Heatseekers Albums (RMNZ)	8
US Billboard 200	27
US Top R&B/Hip-Hop Albums (Billboard)	18
US Digital Albums (Billboard)	9
US Indie Store Album Sales (Billboard)	24
