= Vic Mensa =

American rapper (born 1993)

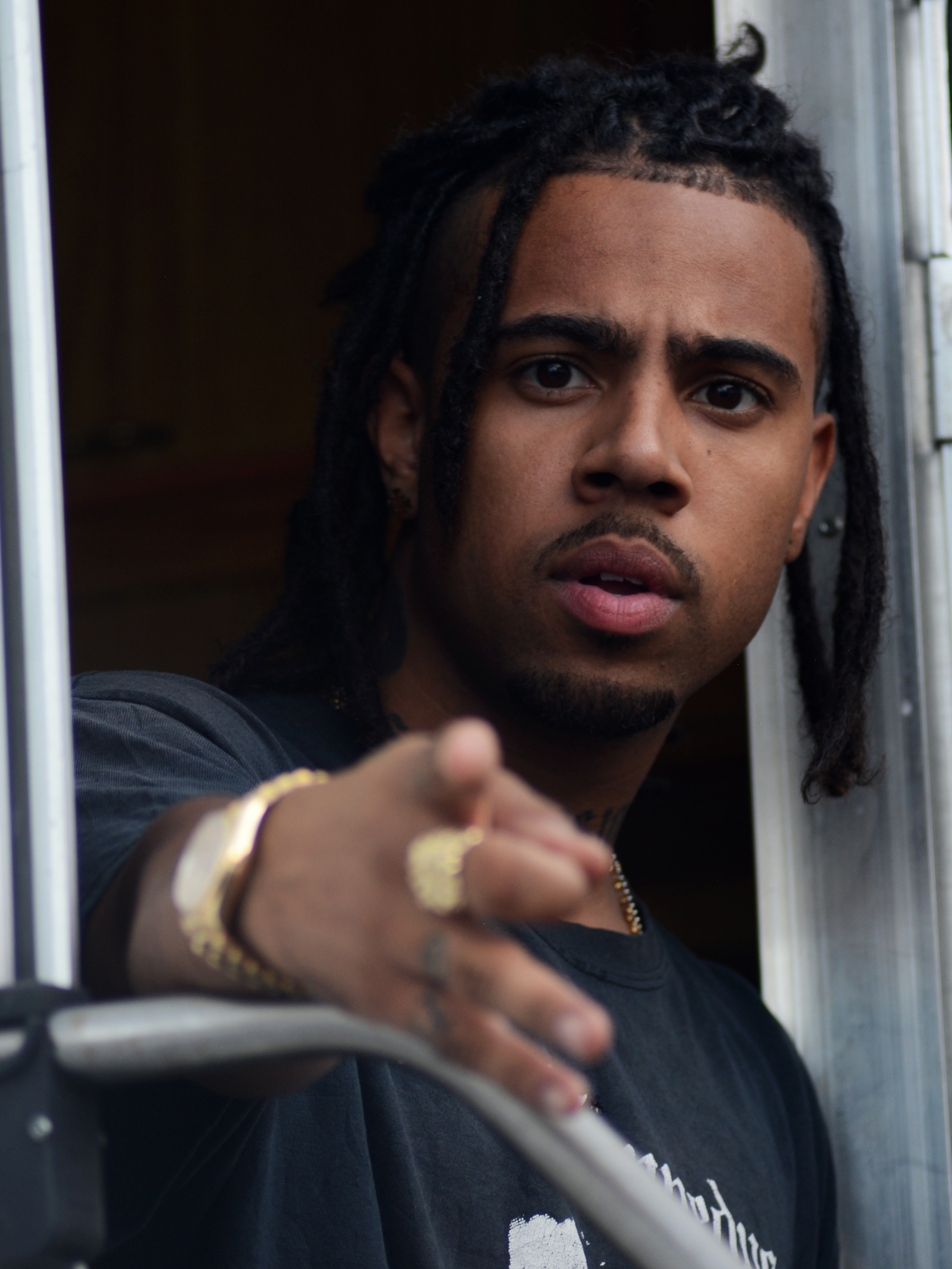
- Mensa in 2017

Background information
- Also known as: Vino
- Born: Victor Kwesi Mensah; June 6, 1993 (age 33); Chicago, Illinois, U.S.
- Genre: Midwestern hip-hop
- Occupations: Rapper; singer; songwriter; actor; record producer
- Years active: 2009–present
- Labels: Roc Nation; Def Jam; Capitol; Closed Sessions; Virgin EMI
- Member of: 93Punx; Savemoney
- Formerly of: Kids These Days
- Website: vicmensa.com

Signature
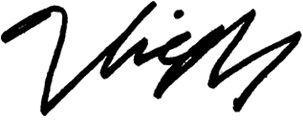

Victor Kwesi Mensah (born June 6, 1993), known professionally as Vic Mensa, is an American rapper and activist. Born and raised in Chicago, he was a member of the regional hip-hop groups Kids These Days and Savemoney prior to releasing his debut solo mixtape, Innanetape (2013). As a solo artist, Mensa has been signed to Virgin EMI Records, Def Jam Recordings, Capitol Records, and Roc Nation.

Mensa's 2014 debut single, "Down on My Luck" experimented with hip house, while his 2015 single, "U Mad" (featuring Kanye West) adopted a drill sound; the former entered the top 40 of the UK singles chart, while the latter received gold certification by the Recording Industry Association of America (RIAA). His debut studio album, The Autobiography (2017), was met with critical praise and moderately entered the Billboard 200, while his second album, Victor (2023), failed to chart. Despite limited mainstream success himself, he has collaborated with high-profile artists including Kanye West, Jay-Z, Pharrell Williams, Pusha T, Wyclef Jean, and Skrillex, among others.

Mensa has been involved in political activism and charitable efforts in his hometown of Chicago, being heavily outspoken on the issue of gun violence. He also is the founder of the SavemoneySavelife foundation, whose mission is to use art and entertainment to foster sustainable change, and funds three programs in Chicago centered on health and the arts.

== Early life and education ==
Victor Kwesi Mensah was born on June 6, 1993, in Chicago, Illinois. His father is from Ghana and his mother is a white American. Mensa grew up in the Hyde Park neighborhood of Chicago. He attended Whitney M. Young Magnet High School. Mensa began his career when he formed a band called Kids These Days in 2009. The band would eventually release two projects, an extended play titled Hard Times in 2011, and a mixtape titled Traphouse Rock in 2012.

== Career ==
=== 2013–2014: Innanetape and XXL Freshman Class ===
Following the band's split up in May 2013, Mensa performed with Gorillaz frontman Damon Albarn at Albarn's 2014 performance at the Governors Ball Music Festival, where he performed the track "Clint Eastwood", filling in for MC Del the Funky Homosapien. When announcing a tour for 2015, Mensa said that he has plans to collaborate with Albarn sometime in the near future.

On September 18, 2013, it was announced, that Mensa would be joining J. Cole and Wale on the What Dreams May Come Tour. Mensa would eventually release his debut mixtape, Innanetape, which was released on September 30, 2013.

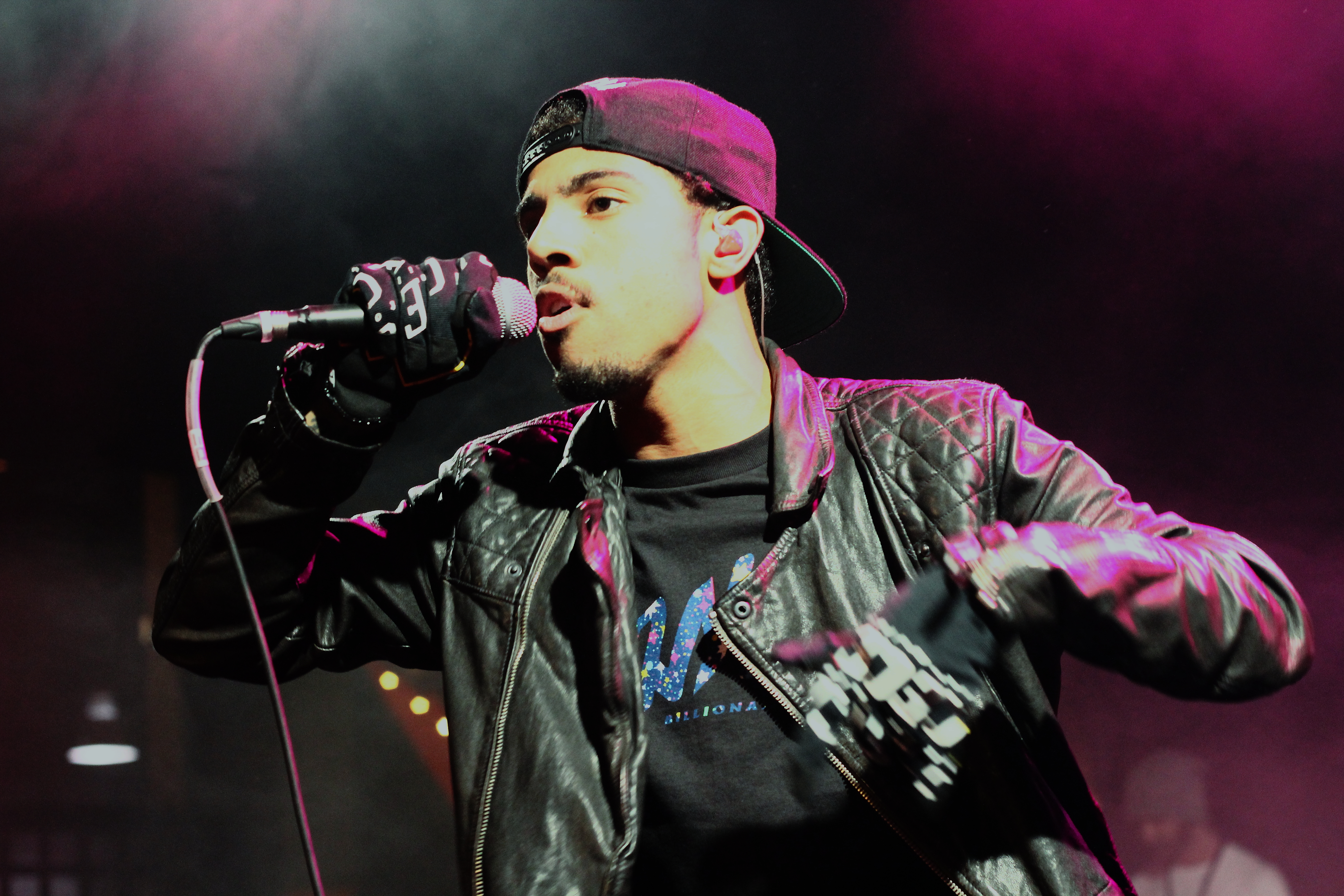
Vic Mensa in 2014

Following the end of the What Dreams May Come Tour, he toured Europe with Danny Brown, for the beginning of February 21, 2014 and ending on March 8. To cap off his rise to stardom, Mensa was chosen to be on the cover of XXL for the Freshman Class of 2014. Mensa's debut single "Down on My Luck" was serviced to urban contemporary radio in the United Kingdom on May 12, 2014. That same day, the accompanying music video was released. "Down on My Luck" was then released for digital download in international markets on June 6, 2014, by Virgin EMI Records.

=== 2015–2017: There's Alot Going On and The Autobiography ===
On February 12, 2015, Kanye West debuted a song, titled "Wolves" at his Adidas Originals showcase. The song featured Mensa himself, along with Sia. Mensa later performed "Wolves" alongside West and Sia on Saturday Night Live's 40th Anniversary Celebration three days later. Mensa would later release an official collaboration with Kanye West, titled "U Mad" on April 10. Eleven days later, Roc Nation announced that Vic had signed to its label, and a video of Mensa signing the deal alongside Jay-Z backstage at his On the Run Tour in Chicago was released on Tidal. Later on in 2015, Mensa received a nomination for Best Rap Song at the 58th Grammy Awards as a songwriter for co-writing Kanye West's single "All Day".

On February 8, 2016, it was announced that Mensa, along with Travis Scott and iLoveMakonnen, will be a part of Alexander Wang's "WANGSQUAD" campaign. On February 19, Mensa released a single, "No Chill", featuring Skrillex. It was produced by Skrillex himself and Jahlil Beats. Mensa guest appeared on Kanye West's single "Wolves", from his seventh studio album The Life of Pablo. A reworked version of the song, which included previously removed guest vocals from Mensa and Australian singer Sia, separated Frank Ocean vocals into a separate track, and was released on Tidal on March 16, 2016.

On June 3, 2016, Mensa released his second extended play, There's Alot Going On. With one guest feature from American singer Ty Dolla Sign, the EP tackled issues such as the Flint water crisis, the murder of Laquan McDonald, and self-inflicted wounds. Mensa's EP debuted at number 127 on the US Billboard 200.

He and his friends were stopped by police for assumed stealing after his spending spree at Barney's of $4,000. He has performed as the opening act during Justin Bieber's Purpose World Tour in Europe.

Leading up to the release of Mensa's debut studio album, he released his third extended play, The Manuscript on June 8, 2017. Three days later, Mensa announced and revealed the album's title of his debut studio album titled, The Autobiography. Mensa would release the lead single titled, "Wings" featuring Pharrell Williams and Saul Williams on July 13. The Autobiography was released on July 28, 2017, through Roc Nation. The album featured guest appearances from Weezer, Syd, The-Dream, Chief Keef, Joey Purp, Pharrell Williams, Saul Williams, Ty Dolla Sign, and Pusha T. The album debuted at number 27 on the US Billboard 200 chart with first-week sales of 15,000 units first week.

=== 2018–2019: Hooligans and 93Punx ===
Mensa released his fourth EP, Hooligans, on December 14, 2018. It was supported by the singles "Reverse", featuring G-Eazy, and "Dark Things".

In January 2019, Mensa formed a punk rock and rap band named 93Punx, which subsequently released a cover of the Cranberries song "Zombie". 93Punx later issued their debut single, "Camp America", featuring children in cages in an ICE-inspired video. The singles "3 Years Sober" with Travis Barker and "It's a Bad Dream", featuring Good Charlotte, came out in July and August 2019, respectively. The band's self-titled debut album was released on August 23, 2019.

=== 2020-present: V Tape, Akilla's Escape, I Tape and Vino Valentino ===
Mensa returned in August 2020 with his first single of the year, "No More Teardrops", featuring Malik Yusef and Wyatt Waddell, a song tackling police brutality, street crime, corruption and the prison system. The song appeared on Roc Nation's compilation album, Reprise. Mensa would later release his fifth extended play, V Tape, on August 21, 2020, which features from Snoh Alaegra, SAINt JHN, BJ Chicago Kid, Peter Cottontale and Eryn Allen Kane.

Also in 2020, Mensa would take a leap into acting in the TIFF film Akilla's Escape, in which he played the character Prince. The film would go on to be nominated for 8 Canadian Screen Awards subsequently winning 5 of them, including Best Original Screenplay

On March 26, 2021, Mensa put out the album I Tape, again under Roc Nation. The album further explored the themes of the American Dream that riddled his prior works, discussing the shattering of expectations brought on by the reality of systematic abuse. The album quickly garnered commendation from rap news outlets for its unabashed condemnation and meditation on racial injustice in America and its message of prison reform. With tracks featuring Chance the Rapper and Wyclef Jean, the album saw a good wave of popularity in the underground scene, and signaled a return to form for the rapper from a critical standpoint.

Off the heels of I TAPE's praise, he would go on to release the 4 song EP Vino Valentino on Valentine's Day 2022.

== Political activism ==
=== Philanthropy and community initiatives ===
Mensa has participated in several charitable and community initiatives across the world.

=== Chicago ===
Mensa's activism is rooted in his hometown of Chicago. He is a vocal critic of police brutality and systemic injustice, often using his platform to speak out against the disproportionate effects of the school-to-prison pipeline on minority communities. To directly address these issues, Mensa founded the SaveMoneySaveLife foundation, which aims to leverage art and entertainment to promote change and support programs in Chicago that provide resources for mental health and arts education. Mensa has advocated for mental health awareness, speaking publicly about his personal experiences and supporting initiatives aimed at improving access to mental health resources through SaveMoneySaveLife.

In August 2018, Mensa distributed thousands of pairs of shoes in Chicago's Englewood neighborhood through an "Anti-Bait Truck" event. In November 2020, he participated in an overnight "Sleep Out Chicago" event to raise awareness of youth homelessness and funds for Covenant House. In September 2022, Mensa and his cannabis company, 93 Boyz, provided $10,000 worth of free gasoline to Chicago residents. He is known for the "Feed the Block, Warm the Block" initiative, a seasonal program that provides meals and warm clothing to Chicago's unhoused population during colder months. Mensa has also taken an entrepreneurial approach to philanthropy with 93 Boyz. The brand's mission is explicitly tied to social equity, as a portion of its proceeds is dedicated to providing clean water and expunging cannabis-related convictions for individuals affected by the war on drugs, representing a tangible effort to address past injustices. In 2023, Mensa and 93 Boyz launched Books Before Bars, an initiative providing books to prison libraries in Illinois.

=== Ghana ===
In Ghana, Mensa worked with his father on a project to construct water boreholes to improve access to clean drinking water, with the first completed in Koforidua by January 2023 and two additional locations planned. That month, he co-organized the Black Star Line Festival in Accra with Chance the Rapper, celebrating African music, culture and connections with the African diaspora.

=== Palestine ===
In 2017, Mensa traveled to Palestine with the organization Dream Defenders to film a music video for his song "We Could Be Free," he documented his experience in an essay for Time magazine, in which he drew parallels between the challenges faced by Palestinians living under military occupation and the struggles of Black Americans in the United States, including issues of racial profiling, incarceration, and systemic injustice. He detailed his firsthand observations of checkpoints and the separation wall, which he likened to the economic and social divides in his hometown of Chicago.

In October 2023, Mensa signed an open letter for the "Artists4Ceasefire" campaign alongside over 600 other artists, urging President Joe Biden to push for a ceasefire amid the 2023 Israeli invasion of the Gaza Strip.

== Personal life ==
Mensa is in a long-term relationship with his girlfriend. The couple had their first child, a son named Mansa Musa Mensa, in 2024. Mensa publicly announced the birth in February 2025, explaining his decision to keep it private until then was to "protect our peace." He stated that the name was chosen to honor his African ancestry, specifically the 14th-century emperor of the Mali Empire.

Mensa has been open about his sobriety from alcohol and substance abuse, which he has maintained for several years.

Mensa is Muslim, stating that "Islam has been cataclysmically impactful for me," attributing to it a significant shift in his consciousness and discipline. He has also expressed admiration for traditional African spiritual systems, such as Vodou and Yoruba, which he argues were "demonised" as a tool of colonization, describing them as systems of ancestor worship that believe in a single deity.

== Controversy ==
In October 2018, as part of his BET Hip Hop Awards Cypher, Mensa dissed late rapper XXXTentacion, referencing his domestic abuse charges and mocking his murder. Subsequently, he received backlash on social media as well as from other artists. Additionally, Mensa later apologized on Instagram for dissing XXXTentacion in front of his mother, but stood by the lyrics, saying:

"Recently, I did a freestyle for the BET [Hip Hop] Awards cypher addressing and condemning rappers who unabashedly abuse women and those who stand up for them and even call them legends, I stand behind those statements. It was pre-recorded weeks ago, and I had no idea a grieving mother would be in the audience to honour her lost son. I never intended to disrespect her, and I offer my deepest condolences for her loss at the hands of gun violence. However, I vehemently reject the trend in Hip Hop of championing abusers, and I will not hold my tongue about it. I don't give a fuck about getting attention. I care about bringing awareness and holding people accountable for their actions".

== Legal issues ==
On January 15, 2022, Mensa was arrested at the Dulles Airport by the Metro Police after Border Protection discovered LSD and psilocybin mushrooms, capsules and gummies. He was charged with felony narcotics possession. On June 27, 2022, Mensa reached a plea agreement. His jail sentence was suspended, he received unsupervised probation, completed 25 hours of community service, and paid a $1,000 fine. Following the plea agreement, Mensa called for reforms to laws governing psychedelics, citing research into their potential use in treating mental health conditions.

== Artistry ==
In interviews with XXL and Complex, Mensa cited hip-hop artists such as Jay-Z, Kanye West, Earl Sweatshirt, A Tribe Called Quest, Timbaland, Eminem, Biggie Smalls, Missy Elliott, Lupe Fiasco, UGK, J Dilla, The Pharcyde, DMX, Nas, 2Pac, Hieroglyphics, De La Soul, Wu-Tang Clan, Lil Wayne, Kid Rock, and Snoop Dogg as musical influences. In 2013, XXL called his breakthrough mixtape Innanetape "lyrical nourishment" and commented on his ability to "bend words at will, cramming syllables into lines with obvious glee." In his music and in public discourse, Mensa has been vocal about gun violence and other social issues, including mental health.

== Discography ==
Studio albums

- The Autobiography (2017)
- Victor (2023)

Collaborative albums

- 93Punx (with 93Punx) (2019)

== Awards and nominations ==
Year	Awards	Category	Nominated work	Result
2015	mtvU Woodie Awards	Best Video Woodie	"Down on My Luck"	Nominated
2016	Grammy Awards	Best Rap Song	"All Day" (as a songwriter)	Nominated
2018	NAACP Image Awards	Outstanding New Artist	Himself	Nominated
