= Jaden Smith discography =

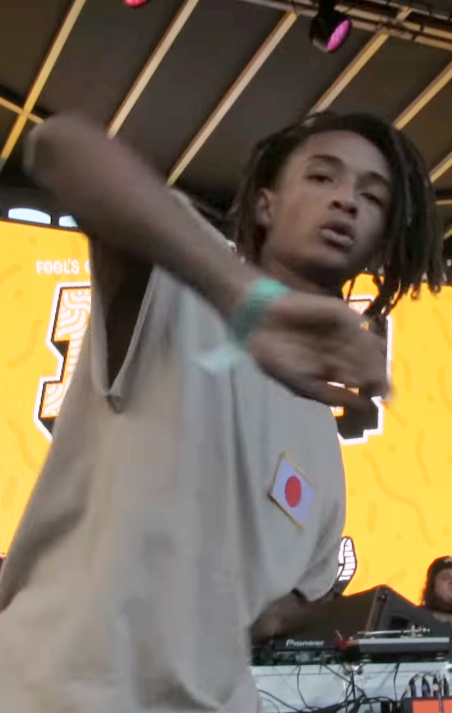
- Jaden in 2015
- Studio albums: 3
- EPs: 3
- Singles: 16
- Music videos: 28
- Mixtapes: 3

American rapper Jaden Smith has released three studio albums, three mixtapes, three extended plays, 16 singles (including five singles as a featured artist) and 28 music videos. In 2010, Smith collaborated with singer Justin Bieber on the song "Never Say Never", which peaked at number eight on the US Billboard Hot 100 and later becoming certified 5× platinum by the RIAA. Smith released his debut mixtape, The Cool Cafe: Cool Tape Vol. 1, in October 2012, which was followed up by CTV2, a sequel to his mixtape, on November 18, 2014. He then released a three-track collaborative EP with producer Daniel D'artiste titled This Is the Album in February 2015.

On December 1, 2016, Smith re-released CTV2, and three days later he released the music video for "Fallen", the lead single from his debut studio album Syre. The album was released on November 17, 2017, and debuted at number 24 on the US Billboard 200. The album spawned the singles: "Fallen", "Batman", "Watch Me", "Falcon" and "Icon". He later followed up with Syre: The Electric Album, in July 2018 and The Sunset Tapes: A Cool Tape Story, in November 2018.

In April 2019, Jaden released a three track EP titled Erys Is Coming. Jaden later released his second studio album, Erys, on July 5, 2019, and debuted at number 12 on the US Billboard 200. The album spawned the single: "Again".

His most recent album, CTV3: Cool Tape Vol. 3, was released August 28, 2020.

== Albums ==
=== Studio albums ===
List of studio albums, with selected chart positions
Title	Album details	Peak chart positions										Certifications
Title	Album details	US	US R&B /HH	US Rap	AUS	BEL (FL)	CAN	FRA	NLD	NZ	UK	Certifications
Syre	Released: November 17, 2017; Label: MSFTSMusic, Roc Nation; Format: Vinyl, digital download, streaming	24	10	8	—	80	32	142	63	33	85	RIAA: Gold
Erys	Released: July 5, 2019; Label: MSFTSMusic, Roc Nation; Format: Vinyl, digital download, streaming	12	8	6	34	129	18	134	38	25	62	
CTV3: Cool Tape Vol. 3	Released: August 28, 2020; Label: MSFTSMusic, Roc Nation; Format: Digital download, streaming	44	—	25	—	153	55	141	—	—	—	
"—" denotes an album that did not chart or was not released in that territory.

=== Mixtapes ===
List of mixtapes, with year released
Title	Album details	Peak chart positions
Title	Album details	US
The Cool Cafe: Cool Tape Vol. 1	Released: October 1, 2012; Label: Self-released; Format: Digital download	—
CTV2	Released: November 18, 2014; Re-released: December 1, 2016; Label: Self-released; Format: Digital download	—
The Sunset Tapes: A Cool Tape Story	Released: November 17, 2018; Label: MSFTSMusic, Roc Nation; Format: Digital download	117

== Extended plays ==
List of extended plays, with selected details
Title	EP details
This Is the Album (with Daniel D'artiste)	Released: February 5, 2015; Label: Self-released; Format: Digital download
Beast Mode (with TA-KU)	Released: February 24, 2015; Label: Self-released; Format: Digital download
Syre: The Electric Album	Released: July 12, 2018; Label: MSFTSMusic, Roc Nation; Format: Digital download
Erys Is Coming	Released: April 19, 2019; Label: MSFTSMusic, Roc Nation; Format: Digital download
2024: A Case Study of the Long Term Effects of Young Love	Released: October 18, 2024; Label: MSFTSrep, Three Six Zero Recordings; Format: Digital download
2025: A Surrealist Ball or Elephants Reflecting Swans	Released: October 3, 2025; Label: MSFTSrep, Three Six Zero Recordings; Format: Digital download

== Singles ==
=== As lead artist ===
List of singles as lead artist, showing year released and album name
Title	Year	Peak chart positions				Certifications	Album
Title	Year	US Bub.	US R&B/ HH	CAN	NZ Hot	Certifications	Album
"Fallen"	2016	—	—	—	—		Syre
"Batman"	2017	—	—	—	—		Syre
"Watch Me"	2017	—	—	—	—		Syre
"Falcon" (featuring Raury)	2017	—	—	—	—		Syre
"Icon" (solo or featuring Nicky Jam or Will Smith and Nicky Jam)	2017	3	46	75	— (Note: "Icon" did not enter the NZ Top 40 Singles Chart or NZ Hot Singles Chart, but peaked at number five on the NZ Heatseeker Singles Chart.)	RIAA: 2× Platinum; MC: Gold	Syre
"Ghost" (featuring Christian Rich)	2018	—	—	—	— (Note: "Ghost" did not enter the NZ Top 40 Singles Chart or NZ Hot Singles Chart, but peaked at number nine on the NZ Heatseeker Singles Chart.)		Non-album single
"Back on My Sh*t"	2018	—	—	—	—		Skate Kitchen
"Goku"	2018	—	—	—	33		Non album-single
"Again" (featuring Syre)	2019	—	—	—	—		Erys
"Cabin Fever"	2020	—	—	—	34		CTV3: Cool Tape Vol. 3
"Rainbow Bap"	2020	—	—	—	19		CTV3: Cool Tape Vol. 3
"Bye"	2021	—	—	—	—		Trippy Summer
"Summer"	2021	—	—	—	—		CTV3: Cool Tape Vol. 3
"—" denotes items which were not released in that country or failed to chart.

=== As featured artist ===
List of singles, with selected chart positions and certifications
Title	Year	Peak chart positions									Certifications	Album
Title	Year	US	AUS	AUT	CAN	FRA	IRE	NZ	SWI	UK	Certifications	Album
"Never Say Never" (Justin Bieber featuring Jaden Smith)	2010	8	17	31	11	93	22	20	38	34	RIAA: 5× Platinum; ARIA: 3× Platinum; BPI: Gold; MC: Platinum; RMNZ: Gold	Never Say Never: The Remixes and The Karate Kid
"All About You" (Brandon Thomas featuring Jaden Smith)	2016	—	—	—	—	—	—	—	—	—		Non album-singles
"Uno Dos" (Teo featuring Jaden Smith)	2017	—	—	—	—	—	—	—	—	—		Non album-singles
"Just Slide" (Harry Hudson featuring Jaden Smith)	2018	—	—	—	—	—	—	—	—	—		Non album-singles
"Shibuya (Ghost II)" (Christian Rich featuring Jaden, Vic Mensa, and Belly)	2019	—	—	—	—	—	—	—	—	—		Non album-singles
"Your Imagination" (Babe Rainbow featuring Jaden)	2021	—	—	—	—	—	—	—	—	—		Changing Colours
"—" denotes a title that was not released or did not chart.

== Other charted songs ==
List of other charted songs, with selected chart positions, showing year released and album name
Title	Year	Peak chart positions				Certifications	Album
Title	Year	US Bub.	US R&B/ HH	CAN	NZ Hot	Certifications	Album
"Sin" (Young Thug featuring Jaden Smith)	2018	3	48	95	32	RIAA: Gold	On the Rvn
"Iconic" (Logic featuring Jaden Smith)	2018	21	—	—	15		YSIV
"I"	2019	—	—	—	36		Erys
"Noize" (featuring Tyler, the Creator)	2019	—	—	—	29		Erys
"Summertime in Paris" (featuring Willow)	2019	—	—	—	14	RIAA: Gold	Erys
"Chateau" (featuring ASAP Rocky)	2019	—	—	—	26		Erys
"Falling for You" (featuring Justin Bieber)	2020	—	—	—	15		CTV3: Cool Tape Vol. 3
"—" denotes items which failed to chart.

== Guest appearances ==
List of non-single guest appearances, with other performing artists, showing year released and album name
Title	Year	Other performer(s)	Album
"Never Say Never (Acoustic Version)"	2010	Justin Bieber	My Worlds Acoustic and My Worlds: The Collection
"Thinkin Bout You"	2011	Justin Bieber	Non-album singles
"Happy New Year"	2012	Justin Bieber	Non-album singles
"Fairytale"	2012	Justin Bieber	Believe
"The Worst (Remix)"	2013	Jhené Aiko	Non-album single
"Pop Thieves (Make It Feel Good)"	2014	Childish Gambino	Kauai
"Late Night in Kauai"	2014	Childish Gambino	Kauai
"Lonely"	2016	Post Malone, Teo	August 26th
"Like This"	2016	Rich the Kid	Rich Forever Music 2
"Here (Remix)"	2016	Alessia Cara	Here (The Remixes) – EP
"#WHEREISTHELOVE"	2016	The Black Eyed Peas, The World	—N/a
"Kitchen"	2016	Kid Cudi	Passion, Pain & Demon Slayin'
"Pothole"	2017	Tyler, The Creator	Flower Boy
"Perry Aye"	2017	ASAP Mob, ASAP Rocky, ASAP Nast, Playboi Carti	Cozy Tapes Vol. 2: Too Cozy
"Moonlight"	2017	Ian Frequency	Frequency
"Sin"	2018	Young Thug	On the Rvn
"Iconic"	2018	Logic	YSIV
"New Orleans"	2018	Brockhampton	Iridescence
"Way Up"	2018	None	Spider-Man: Into the Spider-Verse
"U Know"	2019	Willow	Willow
"I Can't Be Myself"	2021	Justin Bieber	Justice (Triple Chucks Deluxe)

== Music videos ==
List of music videos, showing year released and directors
Title	Year	Director(s)	Ref.
As lead artist
"Give It to Em"	2012	Mike Vargas	
"Gonzoes"	2012	Moisés Arias	
"Pumped Up Kicks (Like Me)"	2012	Mike Vargas	
"The Coolest"	2012	Mike Vargas	
"Hello"	2013	Moises Arias	
"Shakespeare"	2013	Moises Arias	
"Fast"	2014	—N/a	
"Blue Ocean"	2014	Moises Arias	
"4 My 1"	2015	—N/a	
"Scarface"	2015	Moises Arias	
"Like This" (with Rich the Kid)	2016	Miles Cable and Jaden Smith	
"Fallen"	2016	Miles Cable and Jaden Smith	
"Batman"	2017	Moises Arias	
"Watch Me"	2017	Shomi Patwary	
"Icon"	2017	—N/a	
"George Jeff"	2017	—N/a	
"Icon (Remix)" (featuring Nicky Jam)	2018	—N/a	
"Ghost" (featuring Christian Rich)	2018	—N/a	
"The Passion"	2018	—N/a	
"Plastic"	2018	Jaden Smith	
"Goku"	2018	Jaden Smith	
"A Calabasas Freestyle"	2019	Jaden Smith	
"Watch Me (Remix)"	2019	Jaden Smith	
"Soho"	2019	Jaden Smith	
As featured artist
"Never Say Never" (Justin Bieber featuring Jaden Smith)	2010	Honey	
"Find You Somewhere" (AcE featuring Jaden and Willow Smith)	2012	Jada Pinkett Smith	
"Uno Dos" (Teo featuring Jaden Smith)	2017	Esteban Arango	
"Just Slide" (Harry Hudson featuring Jaden Smith)	2019	DirectedxModels	
"RITMO (Bad Boys for Life) (Remix)" (Black Eyed Peas, J Balvin, and Jaden Smith)	2020	—N/a	
Guest appearances
"Black Suits Comin' (Nod Ya Head)" (Will Smith)	2002	Francis Lawrence	
"Feels Like Summer"	2018	Ivan Dixon, Greg Sharp, Justin Richburg	
"Stuck with U" (Ariana Grande and Justin Bieber)	2020	—N/a	—N/a
