= CTV3: Cool Tape Vol. 3 =

Studio album by Jaden
- Released: August 28, 2020
- Recorded: 2019–2020
- Genres: Psychedelic; trap; techno; ambient folk
- Length: 51:00
- Labels: MSFTSMusic; Roc Nation; Republic
- Producers: Asheley Turner; Boi-1da; Brian Lee; Burns; Jahaan Sweet; James Rim; Josiah Bell; Kevinshideout; Omarr; Trippy Summer Band; Young Fyre

Jaden chronology
Erys (2019)	CTV3: Cool Tape Vol. 3 (2020)	2024: A Case Study of the Long Term Effects of Young Love (2024)

Singles from CTV3: Cool Tape Vol. 3
- 1. "Cabin Fever" Released: July 23, 2020; 2. "Rainbow Bap" Released: August 14, 2020

CTV3: Cool Tape Vol. 3 is the third studio album by American rapper Jaden Smith and the fourth installment in the Cool Tape series (preceded by The Cool Cafe: Cool Tape Vol. 1, CTV2, and The Sunset Tapes: A Cool Tape Story). It includes features from Justin Bieber and Raury. The singles "Cabin Fever" and "Rainbow Bap" were released on July 23, 2020, and August 14, 2020, respectively.

== Summary ==
Following the release of the album's lead single "Cabin Fever", the 17-track album was announced on August 14, 2020, and that it would feature guest appearances from Justin Bieber and Raury. Smith taught himself guitar for the album. Smith stated the album acts as a prequel to Syre, taking place when Smith was 15 years old going onto 17.

== Reception ==
Reviews commented on the nostalgic feeling of the album and its departure as something new and different from Smith's previous works. Some reviews noted that CTV3 branched off into new styles like '60s psych-rock.

== Track listing ==
CTV3 has seventeen tracks that run for a total of 51 minutes.

No.	Title	Writer(s)	Producer(s)	Length
1.	"Circa 2015"	Jaden Smith; Josiah Bell; Omarr Rambert	Josiah Bell; Omarr	2:12
2.	"Falling for You" (with Justin Bieber)	Smith; Bell; Rambert; Nick Stoubis; Justin Bieber; Jason Boyd	Bell; Omarr; Trippy Summer Band	3:43
3.	"Rainbow Bap"	Smith; Bell; Rambert; Stoubis; James Rim; Brian Lee	Bell; Omarr; Trippy Summer Band	4:40
4.	"Lucy!"	Smith; Bell; Rambert; Stoubis	Bell; Omarr; Trippy Summer Band	2:08
5.	"Everything"	Smith; Matthew Samuels; Jahaan Sweet; Asheley Turner; Kevin Colquhoun; Rambert; Bell	Boi-1da; Sweet; Turner; Kevinshideout; Omarr; Bell	2:49
6.	"In the Hills"	Smith; Stoubis; Mateo Arias	Trippy Summer Band	2:33
7.	"Bad Connection"	Smith; Rambert; Tremeine Winfrey	Omarr; Young Fyre	1:44
8.	"Muted Sunrise"	Smith; Bell; Stoubis; Rambert	Bell; Omarr; Trippy Summer Band	2:23
9.	"Young in Love"	Smith; Bell; Rambert	Bell; Omarr	4:51
10.	"Cabin Fever"	Smith; Matthew Burns	Burns	3:15
11.	"Photograph"	Smith; Lee; Rim; Odessa Adlon	Lee; Rim	2:21
12.	"Drops of Sun"	Smith; Stoubis; Rim	Trippy Summer Band	2:20
13.	"Sunburnt"	Smith; Bell; Rambert	Bell; Omarr	3:09
14.	"Deep End"	Smith; Lee; Rim	Lee; Rim	4:00
15.	"Endless Summer" (featuring Raury)	Smith; Bell; Rambert; Raury Tullis	Bell; Omarr	3:30
16.	"The Birth of Syre"	Smith; Stoubis	Trippy Summer Band	2:14
17.	"Boys and Girls"	Smith; Bell; Rambert	Bell; Omarr	3:42
Total length:				51:00

== Expanded release ==
On August 28, 2021 (exactly a year after the release of CTV3: Cool Tape Vol. 3) Jaden Smith released the CTV3: Day Tripper’s Edition, a 19-track expansion that includes features from Joey Badass, ¿Téo?, and Babe Rainbow. The first single off of his CTV3 Day Trippers Edition album was titled “BYE.” and was released early on June 22, 2021. Jaden is quoted as saying about the single, “I was sad when I made this song, but I’m happy it’s out. Welcome to CTV3, welcome to trippy summer. It was the time of our lives.”
