= Big Fish (song) =

Single by Vince Staples

from the album Big Fish Theory
- Released: May 18, 2017
- Studio: EastWest Studios, Los Angeles
- Genre: West Coast hip-hop; trap; G-funk
- Length: 3:18
- Label: Blacksmith; ARTium; Def Jam
- Songwriters: Vincent Staples; Kehinde Hassan; Taiwo Hassan; Jordan Michael Houston
- Producer: Christian Rich

Vince Staples singles chronology
"Ascension" (2017)	"Big Fish" (2017)	"Rain Come Down" (2017)

Music video
- "Big Fish" on YouTube

"Big Fish" is a song recorded by American rapper Vince Staples for his second studio album, Big Fish Theory (2017). It was released on May 18, 2017 by Blacksmith Records, ARTium Recordings and Def Jam Recordings. The song features vocals from Juicy J and was produced by Christian Rich.

== Reception and composition ==
"Big Fish" as produced by Nigerian/Chicago duo Christian Rich, featured as Pitchfork's "Best New Track" with Sheldon Pearce deeming it as "a meditation on rap's transformative properties," saying it "engages with rap as a mechanism to escape poverty, evaluating the wealth gap between an emerging rapper’s past and present." According to Clash, Staples "not only reflects on his life prior to fame, but also address the problems that come with success." Spin stated the song takes cues from west coast funk.

== Music video ==
The song's accompanying music video premiered on May 18, 2017 on Staples' Vevo channel on YouTube. The music video was directed by David Helman. In the video, Staples is "sitting on a sailboat that's slowly sinking into shark-infested waters. Despite the circumstances, Staples casually leans back and fires a few flares while he tears through the relentless "Big Fish"."

== Charts ==
Chart (2017)	Peak position
Australia (ARIA)	82
Belgium (Ultratip Bubbling Under Flanders)	11
US Bubbling Under R&B/Hip-Hop Singles (Billboard)	10

== Certifications ==
Region	Certification	Certified units/sales
United States (RIAA)	Gold	500,000^{‡}
^{‡} Sales+streaming figures based on certification alone.
