= Big Fish Theory =

Studio album by Vince Staples
- Released: June 23, 2017
- Studios: EastWest (Los Angeles); The Torch (Los Angeles)
- Genres: Hip-hop; electronic; avant-garde dance; hip house; UK garage
- Length: 36:04
- Labels: Blacksmith; Def Jam
- Producers: Christian Rich; GTA; Jimmy Edgar; Ray Brady; Sophie; Zack Sekoff

Vince Staples chronology
Prima Donna (2016)	Big Fish Theory (2017)	FM! (2018)

Singles from Big Fish Theory
- 1. "BagBak" Released: February 2, 2017; 2. "Big Fish" Released: May 18, 2017; 3. "Rain Come Down" Released: June 8, 2017

Big Fish Theory is the second studio album by American rapper Vince Staples. It was released on June 23, 2017, through Blacksmith Records and Def Jam Recordings. Featuring an avant-garde style that leans toward electronic club music genres such as house and Detroit techno, it contains production work from Christian Rich, Zack Sekoff, Sophie, Ray Brady, Jimmy Edgar, GTA, Justin Vernon and Flume, among others; as well as vocal contributions from a variety of artists including Kilo Kish, Kendrick Lamar, Juicy J, Ty Dolla Sign, Damon Albarn, Ray J, ASAP Rocky and Kučka.

Staples promoted Big Fish Theory with a tour through Canada and the United States, the Life Aquatic Tour. The album received widespread acclaim from critics, and debuted at number 16 on the US Billboard 200. It was supported by three singles: "BagBak", "Big Fish" and "Rain Come Down".

== Recording and production ==
The majority of Big Fish Theory was recorded at EastWest Studios in Los Angeles, except for "Ramona Park Is Yankee Stadium" and "BagBak", which were recorded with producer Ray Brady at The Torch, also in Los Angeles. Staples met Zack Sekoff, the album's primary producer, through Staples' DJ Westside Ty.

== Music and lyrics ==
=== Style and influences ===
Big Fish Theory's sound was inspired by Detroit techno. Los Angeles producer Zack Sekoff, who has production credit on five of the songs on the album, sourced inspiration when on a semester abroad in London from artists such as Burial, James Blake, Novelist, Wiley and Zomby.

=== Composition and lyrics ===
Big Fish Theory is a hip-hop album, with several publications noting that the album leans toward electronic club music genres such as house and Detroit techno. The album contains "terse and percussive" beats. Rolling Stone characterized the album as an "avant-garde dance record that takes stock of his current loves, victories, politics and – most noticeably – interest in the cutting edge of electronic music". Similarly, Justin Moran of Out said the album "fuses avant-garde electronica with aggressive hip-hop" and HipHopDX described it as "one of the more avant-garde projects backed by Def Jam". "Crabs in a Bucket" has wind, a police siren, ambient tape hiss, vocal chops and synthesizers. "Party People" has "stuttering" and syncopated tom-toms.

Big Fish Theory's lyrics are nihilistic and touch on politics, suicide, racism and success and fame. NME said: "[Staples'] bleak lyrical brilliance is perfectly matched by Big Fish Theory's experimental production. He's always had a taste for harsh electronic funk, and he embraces that creative urge more eagerly than ever. There's slo-mo techno, dystopian G-funk, field recordings, growling industrialism; abstract, icy grooves more indebted to Berlin than Atlanta." AllMusic described the record as "a skittish thought piece wrapped around the nucleus of the Chicago footwork sound". Brian Josephs of Spin thought that "Big Fish Theory's whiplash sonic shifts and industrial makeup will make comparisons with Kanye West's Yeezus easy. However, it may have more in common with The Life of Pablo, which combined elements of Yeezus' avant-garde structure with My Beautiful Dark Twisted Fantasy's tortured look at fame".

== Release and promotion ==
On November 29, 2016, Staples announced he would go on a 2017 tour in promotion of Big Fish Theory, the Life Aquatic Tour, alongside Kilo Kish. It began on February 24, 2017, in San Diego, California, and ended on April 9 of the same year, in Phoenix, Arizona.

On January 3, 2017, Staples announced that he would release a song called "BagBak" on February 2, 2017. On May 18, in an interview on Zane Lowe's show Beats 1, he announced the title of his upcoming album and released an accompanying single, "Big Fish". He also announced that Big Fish Theory would be released on June 23, 2017. On June 8, he released his third single, "Rain Come Down", as well an accompanying music video. On June 11, he released the album's artwork and an Instagram photo of the 12-song track list. Billboard's Tatiana Cirisano listed the "clever" artwork, which depicts a "frightened-looking guppy", as one of the best of 2017.

== Critical reception ==
Big Fish Theory ratings
Aggregate scores
Source	Rating
AnyDecentMusic?	8.4/10
Metacritic	89/100
Review scores
Source	Rating
AllMusic	4.5/5 stars
The A.V. Club	A−
Entertainment Weekly	A−
The Guardian	4/5 stars
NME	5/5 stars
The Observer	4/5 stars
Pitchfork	8.7/10
Q	4/5 stars
Rolling Stone	3.5/5 stars
Vice	A−

Big Fish Theory was met with widespread critical acclaim. At Metacritic, which assigns a normalized rating out of 100 to reviews from mainstream publications, the album received an average score of 89, based on 25 reviews. Aggregator AnyDecentMusic? gave it 8.4 out of 10, based on their assessment of the critical consensus.

AllMusic critic Neil Z. Yeung thought that "Big Fish Theory cements Staples' status as one of the most talented and forward-thinking voices in rap in the late 2010s". The A.V. Club's Clayton Purdom stated: "On Big Fish Theory, an album about the guilt that comes with transcending one's home, Staples finds a better language still." Liam Egan of Clash described the album as "a record that not only sees Vince taking risks and progressing forward as an artist, but also another astounding example of what hip-hop should and can be in 2017". Eric Renner Brown of Entertainment Weekly thought that Big Fish Theory "surpasses expectations, with incisive lyrics and beats that spurn current trends for a set that sounds unlike anything else in hip-hop right now". The Guardian's Kate Hutchinson stated that the record "makes for a challenging, dystopian listen, the blade runner to everyone else's replicant".

Joe Madden of NME stated that Staples' lyrics are "emotionally calibrated for 2017: antsy, alienated and occasionally overcome with nihilistic despair at the state of the world. And his bleak lyrical brilliance is perfectly matched by Big Fish Theory's experimental production". Pitchfork gave it the title of "Best New Music" with writer Sheldon Pearce stating that "Big Fish Theory feels like a natural progression" and further added: "Amid the gleaming productions, he's still exploring darkness." Rolling Stone's Christopher R. Weingarten stated: "sure, it's less focused than the reportage of 2015's Summertime '06, but the varying emotions and outlooks mark a full step forward into becoming a multi-layered, genre-crossing, emotion-spilling pop auteur in the vein of [Kanye] West, Drake or Childish Gambino." The Line of Best Fit's Erik Thompson wrote that "on this record it is clear that Staples is making his own assertive artistic statement for these turbulent times, while also firmly establishing himself as one of the brash, singular voices that is going to be leading the music world into the chaotic, unpredictable future". Sputnikmusic praised the album, calling it the best hip hop album of 2017.

=== Year-end lists ===
Select year-end rankings of Big Fish Theory
Publication	List	Rank	Ref.
The A.V. Club	The A.V. Club's 20 Best Albums of 2017	9	
Billboard	Billboard's 50 Best Albums of 2017	18	
Complex	The Best Albums of 2017	14	
Consequence	Top 50 Albums of 2017	4	
Entertainment Weekly	The 25 Best Albums of 2017	7	
The Independent	The 30 Best Albums of 2017	16	
NME	NME's Albums of the Year 2017	15	
Pitchfork	The 50 Best Albums of 2017	7	
Rolling Stone	50 Best Albums of 2017	28	
Stereogum	The 50 Best Albums of 2017	18	

== Commercial performance ==
Big Fish Theory debuted at number 16 on the US Billboard 200 with 24,000 album-equivalent units, of which 14,000 were pure album sales.

== Track listing ==
Big Fish Theory track listing
No.	Title	Writer(s)	Producer(s)	Length
1.	"Crabs in a Bucket"	Vincent Staples; Zack Sekoff; Justin Vernon; Lakisha Robinson; Amerie Rogers; Richard Harrison; Stanley Walden	Sekoff; Vernon^{[c]}	3:17
2.	"Big Fish"	Staples; Kehinde Hassan; Taiwo Hassan; Jordan Houston	Christian Rich	3:18
3.	"Alyssa Interlude"	Staples; Sekoff; Rodger Penzabene; Barrett Strong; Norman Whitfield	Sekoff	2:38
4.	"Love Can Be..."	Staples; Matthew Toth; Julio Mejia; Damon Albarn; Robinson; Alonzo Mathis; Dana Ramey; Christopher Ussery; William Norwood, Jr.	GTA	2:58
5.	"745"	Staples; James Edgar	Jimmy Edgar	3:47
6.	"Ramona Park Is Yankee Stadium"	Staples; Raymond Brady III	Ray Brady	0:51
7.	"Yeah Right"	Staples; Sophie Xeon; Harley Streten; Kendrick Duckworth; Laura Jane Lowther	Sophie; Flume^{[a]}	3:08
8.	"Homage"	Staples; Sekoff; Robinson; Joshua Murphy; Julius Preston; William Roberts	Sekoff	2:53
9.	"Samo"	Staples; Xeon; Rakim Mayers	Sophie	2:54
10.	"Party People"	Staples; Sekoff	Sekoff	2:58
11.	"BagBak"	Staples; Brady	Brady	2:41
12.	"Rain Come Down"	Staples; Tyrone Griffin, Jr.; Sekoff	Sekoff	4:41
Total length:				36:04

Notes

- ^{^[c]} signifies a co-producer
- ^{^[a]} signifies an additional producer

Sample credits

- "Alyssa Interlude" contains samples of "I Wish It Would Rain", written by Rodger Penzabene, Barrett Strong and Norman Whitfield, and performed by the Temptations; and excerpts from Tim Chipping's interview with Amy Winehouse.
- "Love Can Be..." contains an interpolation of "Hood Nigga", written by Alonzo Mathis, Dana Ramey and Christopher Ussery, and performed by Gorilla Zoe.
- "Homage" contains an interpolation of "Hold Me Back", written by Joshua Murphy, Julius Preston and William Roberts, and performed by Rick Ross.

== Personnel ==
Credits adapted from the album's official liner notes.

Musicians

- Kilo Kish – additional vocals (tracks 1, 4, 6, 8, 9)
- Juicy J – additional vocals (track 2)
- Damon Albarn – additional vocals (track 4), keyboard (track 4)
- Ray J – additional vocals (track 4)
- Kendrick Lamar – additional vocals (track 7)
- Kučka – additional vocals (track 7)
- ASAP Rocky – additional vocals (track 9)
- Ken Rogers – additional vocals (track 11)
- Ty Dolla Sign – additional vocals (track 12)
- Zack Sekoff – programming (tracks 1, 3, 8, 10, 12), electric guitar (track 3), keyboards (track 3), synth bass (track 8), synthesizer (track 12)
- Christian Rich – programming (track 2)
- Jimmy Edgar – programming (track 5)
- Justin Vernon – additional programming (track 1)
- Taylor Mackall – additional keyboards (track 12)

Production

- Zack Sekoff – production (tracks 1, 3, 8, 10, 12)
- Christian Rich – production (track 2)
- GTA – production (track 4)
- Jimmy Edgar – production (track 5)
- Ray Brady – production (tracks 6, 11), recording (tracks 6, 11)
- Sophie – production (tracks 7, 9)
- Justin Vernon – co-production (track 1)
- Flume – additional production (track 7)
- Michael Law Thomas – recording (tracks 1–5, 7–10, 12), vocal recording (tracks 6, 11)
- William Francis Delaney VI – additional engineering (all tracks)
- Chaz R. Sexton – assistant engineering (tracks 4, 6, 7, 9)
- Mark "Spike" Stent – mixing (all tracks)
- Michael Freeman – mixing assistance (all tracks)
- Chris Gehringer – mastering

Design

- Alexander Bortz – photography

== Charts ==
Chart performance for Big Fish Theory
Chart (2017)	Peak position
Australian Albums (ARIA)	17
Belgian Albums (Ultratop Flanders)	91
Belgian Albums (Ultratop Wallonia)	161
Canadian Albums (Billboard)	19
Dutch Albums (Album Top 100)	60
Irish Albums (IRMA)	39
New Zealand Albums (RMNZ)	28
Swiss Albums (Schweizer Hitparade)	48
UK Albums (Official Charts)	58
US Billboard 200	16
US Top R&B/Hip-Hop Albums (Billboard)	11
