= The Sunset Tapes: A Cool Tape Story =

Mixtape by Jaden
- Released: November 17, 2018
- Recorded: 2018
- Length: 36:40
- Label: MSFTSMusic; Roc Nation; Interscope; Republic
- Producer: Ayo; Boi-1da; Fuse; Jaden; Keanu Beats; Keyz; Louis Bell; Maestro; Mel & Mus; Melvin "Chaos" Lewis; OmArr; Rev-Eng; Rory Andrew; Wonderlust

Jaden chronology
Syre: The Electric Album (2018)	The Sunset Tapes: A Cool Tape Story (2018)	Erys is Coming (2019)

The Sunset Tapes: A Cool Tape Story is the third mixtape by American rapper Jaden, released on November 17, 2018, through MSFTSMusic and Roc Nation under the partnership between Interscope and Republic Records. It premiered on Beats 1 and was released in part to mark the one-year anniversary of Syre. The mixtape is a part of Smith's Cool Tape series which was preceded by The Cool Cafe: Cool Tape Vol. 1 and CTV2.

== Background ==
While Jaden's debut album Syre contained several features, Sunset Tapes contains none. Two of the track titles reference Syre, such as "Syre in Abbey Road" and "Fallen Part 2", the latter of which refers to the track "Fallen" from Syre.

== Promotion ==
Jaden announced the mixtape on Twitter in October, when he also released the track "Goku", which was not included on the mixtape. Smith also held the event The Sunset Tapes: A Cool Tape Story Live for Free or On Demand on Beats 1 to debut the mixtape.

The music videos for "A Calabasas Freestyle" and "Soho" was released on January 17, 2019, and April 12, respectively and was self directed by Jaden.

== Track listing ==
Credits were adapted from Tidal.

No.	Title	Producer(s)	Length
1.	"Soho"	Mel & Mus	3:28
2.	"A Calabasas Freestyle"	Ayo; Keyz; Keanu Beats	2:59
3.	"Play This on a Mountain at Sunset"	Jaden; Maestro	5:41
4.	"Plastic"	Melvin "Chaos" Lewis; OmArr	2:16
5.	"Distant"	Wonderlust	6:06
6.	"Better Things"	Fuse	1:49
7.	"Yeah Yeah"	Rev-Eng	2:53
8.	"Syre in Abbey Road"	Jaden	1:44
9.	"Ten Ten"	Fuse	1:58
10.	"Fallen Part 2"	Louis Bell; Rory Andrew	4:58
11.	"Rollin Around"	Boi-1da	2:48
Total length:			36:40

Notes

- "Soho", "Syre" in the title "Syre in Abbey Road", and "Fallen" in the title "Fallen Part 2" are stylized in all caps

== Charts ==
Chart (2018)	Peak position
US Billboard 200	117
