= All We Need (Raury album) =

Studio album by Raury
- Released: October 16, 2015
- Recorded: 2015
- Genre: Alternative hip hop
- Length: 57:42
- Label: LoveRenaissance; Columbia
- Producer: Raury; Malay; Jacknife Lee; DJ Khalil; Danger Mouse; Take a Daytrip; Om'Mas Keith; Malik Shakur

Raury chronology
Indigo Child (2014)	All We Need (2015)	The Woods (2018)

All We Need is the debut studio album by American musician Raury. It was released on October 16, 2015, by LoveRenaissance and Columbia Records.

== Critical reception ==
Professional ratings
Aggregate scores
Source	Rating
Metacritic	65/100
Review scores
Source	Rating
Consequence of Sound	C
DIY	3/5 stars
Exclaim!	7/10
The Guardian	3/5 stars
HipHopDX	4/5 stars
Pitchfork	6.8/10

All We Need received generally positive reviews from music critics. At Metacritic, which assigns a normalized rating out of 100 to reviews from mainstream critics, the album received an average score of 65 based on 13 reviews, which indicates "generally favorable reviews".

Marcus Dowling of HipHopDX gave high praise to the album's multiple genre-hopping production and Raury's performance that evoke lyrics of optimism and melancholia reminiscent of Outkast and Arrested Development, concluding that "This isn’t an album, it’s the spiritual essence of the joy beyond the pain." Kyle Mullin of Exclaim! commented that Raury was more of a borrower of influences than finding his own style but gave praise to his messages and unique approach to sound, singling out "Friends" as who he truly is, concluding that it "bodes well for an eager young talent who not only has impeccable taste in mentors, but is also finding a strong voice of his own that's sure to inspire coming generations." Jamie Milton of DIY praised Raury for channelling his madcap artistic vision into a focused debut record, concluding that "It could be more unhinged, it could have been a chaotic, crazed mission statement – instead it’s further proof that Raury’s trade is in playing the unexpected hand."

Harriet Gibsone of The Guardian was ambivalent towards the album, feeling the songs were lost in their own messages, saying that "At times, Raury’s energy is more intriguing than his songwriting, and while the lack of cynicism in his lyrics is refreshing, you can’t help but question his decision to play the pop preacher." Pitchfork writer Sheldon Pearce said the record felt like a rehash of his Indigo Child mixtape, noting that the songs have unrefined mixes of different genres and told the same tales, saying that "With an album replete with Spanish guitar jams, wide-eyed hip-hop, and psychedelic rock k-holes, there isn't much ground left for Raury to cover." Adam Kivel of Consequence of Sound admired Raury for spreading his view of the world but found it mired by his choice in mismatched instrumentals and vocal delivery, saying that "All We Need's unflinching sincerity and positivity come with an equal portion of inconsistent, scattered focus."

== Track listing ==
No.	Title	Writer(s)	Producer(s)	Length
1.	"All We Need" (featuring Adia)	Raury Tullis; Malay Ho; Adia Reid	Raury; Malay	4:43
2.	"Revolution"	Tullis; Ho	Malay	3:16
3.	"Forbidden Knowledge" (featuring Big K.R.I.T.)	Tullis; Ho; Justin Scott	Malay	4:02
4.	"Woodcrest Manor II"	Tullis; Ho	Malay	5:10
5.	"CPU" (featuring RZA)	Tullis; Ho; Robert Diggs	Malay	4:28
6.	"Devil's Whisper"	Tullis; Garret Lee	Jacknife Lee	3:40
7.	"Peace Prevail"	Tullis; Khalil Abdul-Rahman; Sam Barsh; Daniel Seeff	DJ Khalil	4:59
8.	"Crystal Express"	Tullis; Brian Burton	Danger Mouse	3:57
9.	"Love is Not a Four Letter Word"	Tullis; Ho	Malay	1:49
10.	"Her"	Tullis; David Biral; Denzel Baptiste	Take a Daytrip	4:16
11.	"Trap Tears" (featuring Key!)	Tullis; Ho; Marquis Whittaker	Malay	5:31
12.	"Mama"	Tullis	Jacknife Lee	3:58
13.	"Kingdom Come"	Tullis; Biral; Baptiste; Om'Mas Keith	Raury; Keith; Take a Daytrip; Malay; Malik Shakur	3:48
14.	"Friends" (featuring Tom Morello)	Tullis; Ho	Raury; Malay	4:05
Total length:				57:42

== Personnel ==
Credits adapted from Tidal.

Musicians and production

- Raury – executive producer, lead vocals (all tracks), acoustic guitar (tracks 1, 6, 14), bass guitar (tracks 1, 12), percussion (track 6), keyboard (track 12), guitar (track 12)
- Justice Baiden – executive producer
- Adia – vocals (tracks 1, 13), background vocals (track 1)
- Chris Arceneaux – drums (track 13)
- Denzel Baptiste – recording engineer (track 13)
- Sam Barsh – keyboard (track 7)
- Big K.R.I.T. – vocals (track 3)
- Matt Bishop – editor (tracks 6, 12), recording engineer (tracks 6, 12)
- Jon Castelli – mixing engineer (track 12)
- Matt Chamberlain – drums (track 10)
- Danger Mouse – bass guitar (track 8), drums (track 8), piano (track 14)
- DJ Khalil – recording engineer (track 7), keyboard (track 7), drums (track 7)
- Tom Elmhirst – mixing engineer (track 6)
- Chris Galland – assistant engineer (tracks 1–5, 7, 9–11, 13, 14)
- Om'Mas Keith – bass guitar (track 13)
- Key! – vocals (track 11)
- Dave Kutch – mastering engineer (all tracks)
- Jacknife Lee – programmer (tracks 6, 12), recording engineer (tracks 6, 12), keyboard (tracks 6, 12), guitar (track 12), percussion (track 12)
- Willie Linton – recording engineer (tracks 1, 13), drums (track 14)
- Malay – recording engineer (tracks 1–5, 9, 11, 14), acoustic guitar (tracks 1, 2, 9), bass guitar (track 1), piano (track 5)
- Manny Marroquin – mixing engineer (tracks 1–5, 7, 9–11, 13, 14)
- Todd Monfalcone – guitar (track 8), assistant engineer (track 8), recording engineer (track 14)
- Jerome Monroe Jr. – piano (track 4)
- Tom Morello – electric guitar (track 14)
- Ryan Nasci – mixing engineer (track 12)
- RZA – vocals (track 5)
- Ike Schultz – assistant engineer (tracks 1–5, 7, 9–11, 13, 14)
- Dan Seeff – guitar (track 7), bass guitar (track 7)
- Malik Shakur – guitar (track 13)
- Kennie Takahasi – mixing engineer (track 8)
- Take a Daytrip – recording engineer (track 10)

Design

- Junia Abaidoo – product manager
- Erika Alfredson – product manager
- JR Lindsey – A&R
- Jimmy Nguyen – photography
- Carlon Ramong – creative director
- Hannah Sider – photography

== Charts ==
Chart (2015)	Peak position
Australian Albums (ARIA)	46
UK Albums (OCC)	152
US Billboard 200	78
