= Icon (song) =

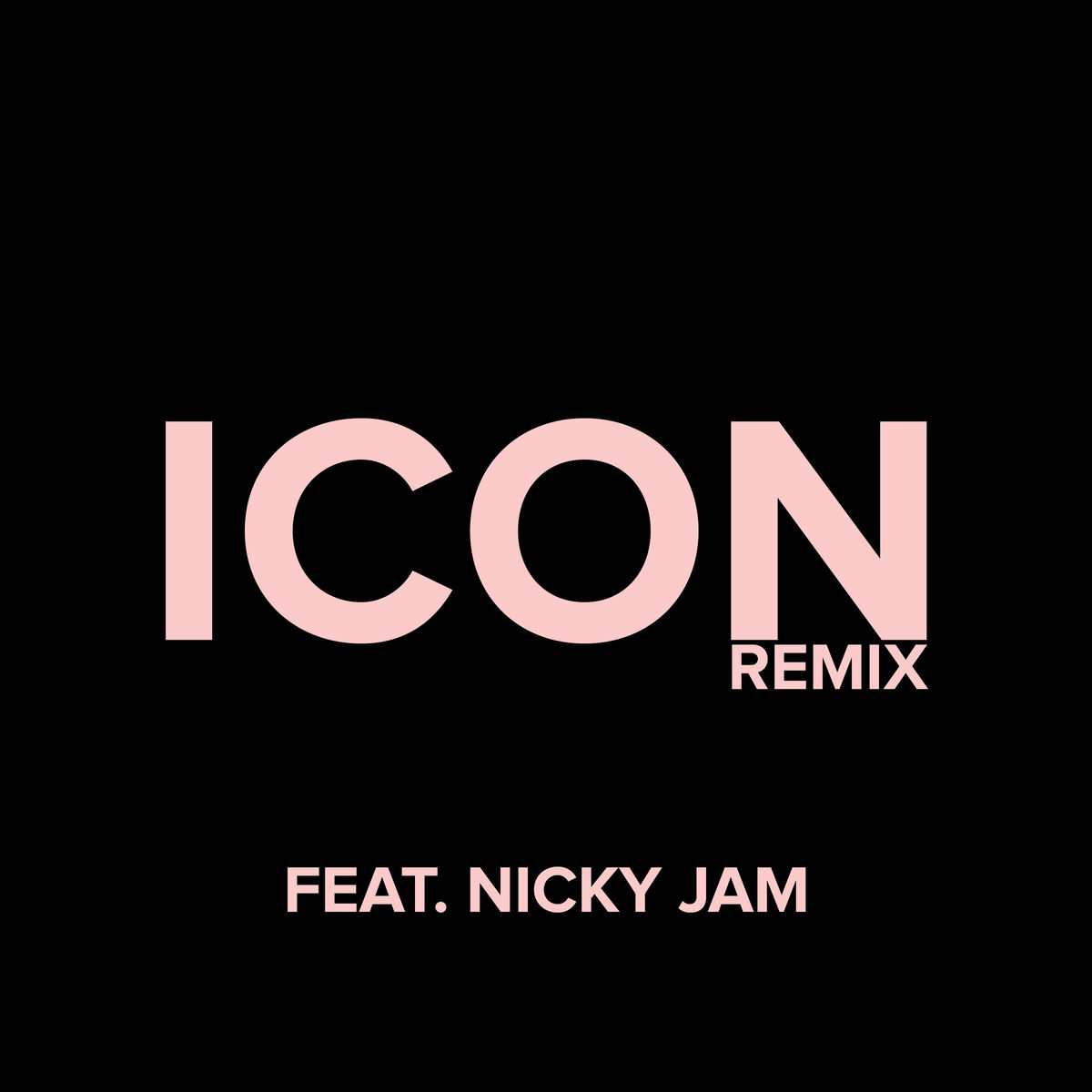
- Nicky Jam remix cover

Single by Jaden

from the album Syre
- Released: November 17, 2017
- Genre: Alternative hip hop
- Length: 3:40
- Label: MSFTSMusic; Roc Nation; Interscope; Republic
- Songwriters: Jaden Smith; Melvin Lewis; Omarr Rambert
- Producers: Melvin Lewis; Omarr Rambert

Jaden Smith singles chronology
"Falcon" (2017)	"Icon" (2017)	"Ghost" (2018)

"Icon" is a song by American rapper Jaden from his debut studio album Syre (2017). The song was released on November 17, 2017.

== Background ==
Written by Jaden, Melvin Lewis and Omarr Rambert, the song is Jaden's most successful single as lead artist.

The song samples "The Hi De Ho Man", originally performed by Cab Calloway.

== Music video ==
The official music video for the song was released on 17 November 2017. It features Jaden performing next to a black Tesla Model X with all the doors open.

== Remixes ==
An official remix of the song featuring American singer-rapper Nicky Jam, with an accompanied music video was released on May 25, 2018.

Another remix of the song, titled: "Icon (Reggaeton Remix)", also featuring Nicky Jam, as well as Jaden's father and rapper Will Smith, was released on June 11, 2018.

Another remix was released on July 12, 2018 in Jaden's EP Syre: The Electric Album titled "Icon?".

== Track listing ==
Digital download
No.	Title	Length
1.	"Icon"	3:40

Digital download – Remix
No.	Title	Length
1.	"Icon" (featuring Nicky Jam)	3:40

Digital download – Reggaeton Remix
No.	Title	Length
1.	"Icon" (featuring Nicky Jam and Will Smith)	3:28

== Charts ==
Chart (2017–2018)	Peak position
Canada Hot 100 (Billboard)	75
New Zealand Heatseekers (RMNZ)	5
US Bubbling Under Hot 100 (Billboard)	3
US Hot R&B/Hip-Hop Songs (Billboard)	46
US R&B/Hip-Hop Airplay (Billboard)	33

== Certifications ==
Region	Certification	Certified units/sales
Brazil (Pro-Música Brasil)	Platinum	40,000^{‡}
Canada (Music Canada)	Gold	40,000^{‡}
New Zealand (RMNZ)	Platinum	30,000^{‡}
Portugal (AFP)	Gold	5,000^{‡}
United Kingdom (BPI)	Silver	200,000^{‡}
United States (RIAA)	2× Platinum	2,000,000^{‡}
^{‡} Sales+streaming figures based on certification alone.
