= Indigo Child (album) =

Mixtape by Raury
- Released: August 25, 2014
- Recorded: 2014
- Genre: Alternative hip hop; alternative rock; soul; folk
- Length: 40:45
- Label: Columbia Records
- Producer: Raury; Daytrip

Raury chronology
Indigo Child (2014)	All We Need (2015)

Singles from Indigo Child
- 1. "God's Whisper" Released: March 3, 2014; 2. "Cigarette Song" Released: July 21, 2014

Indigo Child is the debut mixtape by American musician Raury. It was released for free on August 25, 2014, by Columbia Records.

== Critical reception ==
Professional ratings
Review scores
Source	Rating
Consequence of Sound	C
Exclaim!	7/10
Pitchfork	6.5/10

Scott Simpson of Exclaim! commented about Raury's musicianship throughout the mixtape, "His ideas may be undercooked, and his lyrics youthful if not outright immature, but he has a masterful command of his sound, even if it can't be defined just yet", concluding that an executive producer should be able to direct his raw artistry in the right direction. Pitchfork writer Corbin Goble called it "a perfect introduction to Raury's style-sampling aesthetic, as well as the blizzard of sometimes-undercooked ideas he brings on the table", concluding that "Overall, Indigo Child is an intriguing blueprint for Raury's talent, and watching Raury continue to put it all together going forward will definitely prove fascinating." Brian Josephs from Consequence of Sound commended Raury's cohesive, multi-genre experimentation and earnest delivery but criticized the teenager's perspective in the songs for contributing to underwritten lyricism and poor pacing, concluding that the mixtape is marginally listenable due to Raury's musical artistry containing potential for better future projects.

== Track listing ==
No.	Title	Length
1.	"War (Part One)"	1:00
2.	"What Goes Up"	0:53
3.	"God's Whisper"	4:07
4.	"Superfly (feat. Vancouver Sleep Clinic)"	3:19
5.	"Amor"	3:26
6.	"Rest"	1:14
7.	"Wildfire"	3:59
8.	"Woodcrest Manor"	4:07
9.	"Cigarette Song"	3:55
10.	"Dreaducation"	0:38
11.	"Chariots of Fire"	4:14
12.	"Sweet N Sour"	1:39
13.	"Seven Suns"	8:14
