= Syre: The Electric Album =

EP by Jaden
- Released: July 12, 2018
- Genre: Hip hop
- Length: 28:16
- Label: MSFTSMusic; Roc Nation; Interscope; Republic
- Producer: Lido; OmArr; Josiah Bell; Teo; IQ; Melvin Lewis

Jaden chronology
Syre (2017)	Syre: The Electric Album (2018)	The Sunset Tapes: A Cool Tape Story (2018)

Syre: The Electric Album is the second extended play recorded by American rapper Jaden. It was released on July 12, 2018, through MSFTSMusic and Roc Nation under the partnership between Interscope Records and Republic Records. It is the follow-up to Smith's debut album Syre, released in 2017.

== Background ==
The EP was announced in June 2018 after initially teasing his separate second album entitled Erys, which was released less than a year later on July 5, 2019.

== Release and promotion ==
The promotional single, "Ghost" featuring Christian Rich, was released on June 22, 2018 for streaming and digital download, alongside a music video.

On July 8, 2018, the project was released exclusively on Jaden's Instagram on their IGTV feature on his 20th birthday, which lets users upload videos.

== Track listing ==
Credits were adapted from Tidal.

No.	Title	Writer(s)	Producer(s)	Length
1.	"B" (Electric)	Jaden Smith; Ryan Coleman; Peder Losnegård	Lido	5:05
2.	"Ninety" (Electric)	Smith; Coleman; Losnegård	Lido	4:49
3.	"Lost Boy" (Electric)	Smith; Coleman; Omarr Rambert; Josiah Bell; Mateo Arias	OmArr; Bell; Teo	4:48
4.	"Fallen" (Electric)	Smith; Coleman; T. Thompson	IQ	6:05
5.	"Icon?" (Electric)	Smith; Coleman; Rambert; Melvin Lewis	OmArr; Lewis	6:55
Total length:				28:16

Notes

- "B - Electric" features additional vocals by Lido, Jordyn Woods and Teo Woods
- "Ninety - Electric" features additional vocals by Lido, Teo Hudson and Harry Hudson
- "Fallen - Electric" features additional vocals by Lido and Odessa
