= CTV2 (album) =

Mixtape by Jaden Smith
- Released: November 18, 2014
- Recorded: 2012–2014
- Genre: Hip hop
- Length: 34:21
- Label: Self-released

Jaden Smith chronology
The Cool Cafe (2012)	CTV2 (2014)	This is the Album (2015)

CTV2 (full name: The Cool Cafe: Cool Tape Vol. 2) is the second mixtape by American rapper Jaden Smith. It was released as a free download on November 18, 2014, through his "Jaden Experience" app and was also available on DatPiff. The project is a concept mixtape, written about how Jaden Smith "attempted to turn the hip-hop world upside down". The mixtape is a part of Smith's Cool Tape series which was preceded by The Cool Cafe: Cool Tape Vol. 1 and followed up with The Sunset Tapes: A Cool Tape Story and CTV3: Cool Tape Vol. 3.

The mixtape was later re-released onto streaming services on December 1, 2016.

== Critical reception ==
VIBE's Iyana Robertson concluded, "CTV2 is a good way to bring him back down to his 16-year-old self, although it won’t make you feel any smarter. He is still on another plane than the rest of us" and that "Jaden takes you back to your high school days when you just knew that your clique was the shit."

== Track listing ==
Credits adapted from YouTube.

No.	Title	Length
1.	"Fire" (featuring Christian Rich)	2:13
2.	"Keep Ya Love" (featuring Willow Smith)	2:35
3.	"Zoned"	3:40
4.	"Let It Breathe" (featuring Willow Smith)	10:33
5.	"Young & Reckless"	2:43
6.	"Electric" (featuring Willow Smith)	3:41
7.	"PCH" (featuring Willow Smith)	5:51
8.	"Symba"	3:05
