= The Cool Cafe =

The Cool Cafe: Cool Tape Vol. 1

Mixtape by Jaden Smith
- Released: October 1, 2012
- Genre: Hip hop
- Length: 71:22
- Label: Self-released
- Producers: AcE; AzZi; Chaos; Josiah Bell; Max Gendron; MK; OmArr; T.Coles; Teo; The Stuyvesants

Jaden Smith chronology
| The Cool Cafe: Cool Tape Vol. 1 (2012) | CTV2 (2014) |

The Cool Cafe (full name: The Cool Cafe: Cool Tape Vol. 1) is the debut mixtape by American rapper Jaden Smith. It was released as a free download on DatPiff on October 1, 2012. The mixtape is a part of Smith's Cool Tape series which was followed up by CTV2, The Sunset Tapes: A Cool Tape Story, and CTV3: Cool Tape Vol. 3. Since its release, the mixtape has been downloaded over 100,000 times on DatPiff.

== Background ==
The mixtape focuses on Jaden's skate lifestyle and his clothing/lifestyle brand MSFTSRep. Supposedly, some of the songs refer to his former relationship with Vanessa Hudgens' younger sister, Stella Hudgens.

== Promotion ==
The mixtape was promoted through various music videos with, "Pumped Up Kicks (Like Me)" (A remix to Pumped Up Kicks), was released on August 6, 2012. The music video was directed by Mike Vargas.

The mixtape's second music video, "The Coolest", was released on September 24, 2012. The music video was directed by Mike Vargas.

The mixtape's third music video, "Find You Somewhere", was released on September 17, 2012, and features vocals from AcE and Willow Smith. The music video was directed by Jada Pinkett Smith.

The mixtape's fourth music video, "Hello", was released on March 26, 2013, and was directed by Moises Arias.

== Track listing ==
Credits adapted from DatPiff.

| No. | Title | Producer(s) | Length |
|---|---|---|---|
| 1. | "Hello" | The Stuyvesant | 2:51 |
| 2. | "Know Why" | | 3:25 |
| 3. | "Down" (featuring OmArr and T.Coles) | OmArr; MK | 4:15 |
| 4. | "Cries" | | 4:01 |
| 5. | "Party on Venus" | OmArr; Josiah Bell | 4:05 |
| 6. | "Pharaohs" | | 2:36 |
| 7. | "Chase the Sun" (featuring Josiah Bell) | Josiah Bell; OmArr | 4:05 |
| 8. | "The Coolest" | The Stuyvesants | 2:57 |
| 9. | "MSFTS Anthem" | Chaos; OmArr | 4:19 |
| 10. | "Can't See Tomorrow" (featuring OmArr) | MK; OmArr; Max Gendron | 3:08 |
| 11. | "Jus' Not Ready" (featuring T.Coles) | OmArr; MK | 4:00 |
| 12. | "First Time" (featuring T.Coles) | OmArr; MK | 4:40 |
| 13. | "Find You Somewhere" (featuring Ace and Willow Smith) | AcE | 5:37 |
| 14. | "Cruze" | AzZi | 4:09 |
| 15. | "Pumped Up Kicks (Like Me)" | | 3:02 |
| 16. | "Underwater-Too Much" (featuring OmArr and Josiah Bell) | Teo; OmArr | 7:27 |
| 17. | "Outro" | The Stuyvesants | 1:15 |
| 18. | "Starry Room" (hidden bonus track) | | 5:31 |
