= Raury =

American musician (born 1996)

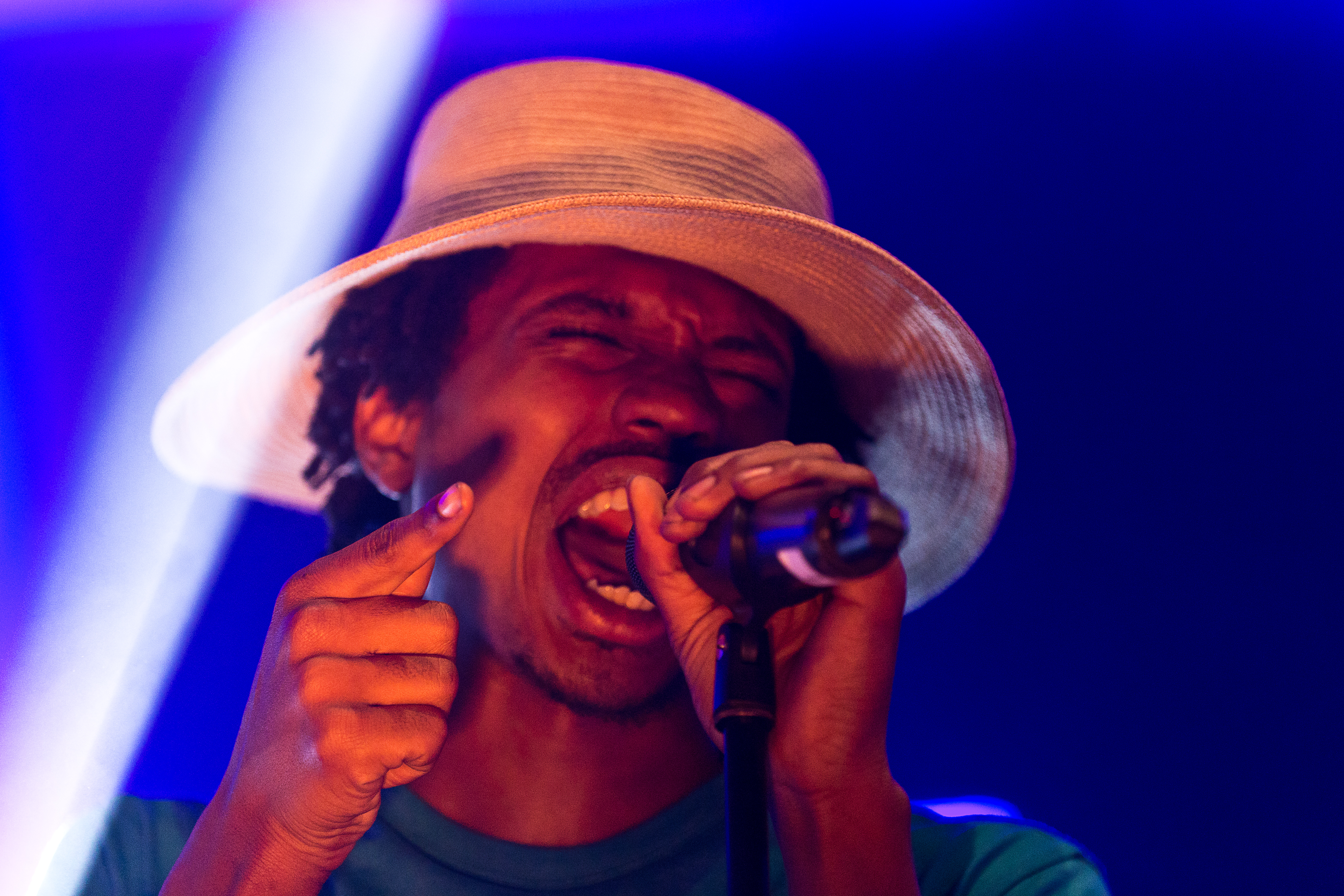
- Tullis performing at the Melt! Festival in Germany in 2015

Background information
- Born: Raury Deshawn Tullis; June 10, 1996 (age 30); Stone Mountain, Georgia, U.S.
- Genres: Alternative hip hop; folk rock; soul; indie rock; alternative R&B
- Occupations: Singer; songwriter; rapper
- Instruments: Vocals; guitar; bass; keyboards; percussion
- Years active: 2014–present
- Label: Columbia

Raury Deshawn Tullis (born June 10, 1996) is an American singer-songwriter and rapper. He is known for his eclectic sound, mixing the genres of soul, hip hop and folk. Born and raised in Stone Mountain, Georgia, he was the inaugural artist signed to the Georgia-based record label Love Renaissance in 2012. He released his debut mixtape Indigo Child in August 2014 to critical acclaim, leading him to sign a recording contract from Columbia Records. His debut studio album, All We Need (2015) was released the following year and marked his sole entry on the Billboard 200. After departing the label in 2018, he released three follow-up albums independently. He was also a member to the C5 Georgia Youth Foundation.

== Early life ==
Raury Deshawn Tullis was born on June 10, 1996, in Stone Mountain, Georgia. It was at age fourteen when Raury decided that he wanted to work with music for the rest of his life. When he was fifteen he started to record and produce music in his friends basement. At that time he was writing songs and putting together projects, but he was too shy to put it out there. Influenced by 2Pac, a lot of his early music was sad, aggressive, and about love. His music told stories and he used music as a tool to express himself. In high school, Raury played guitar in a cover band. In 2014, the year Raury graduated, he threw a music festival called Raurfest on his 18th birthday. He then issued a free digital download of his mixtape Indigo Child, and led him to his popularity.

== Career ==
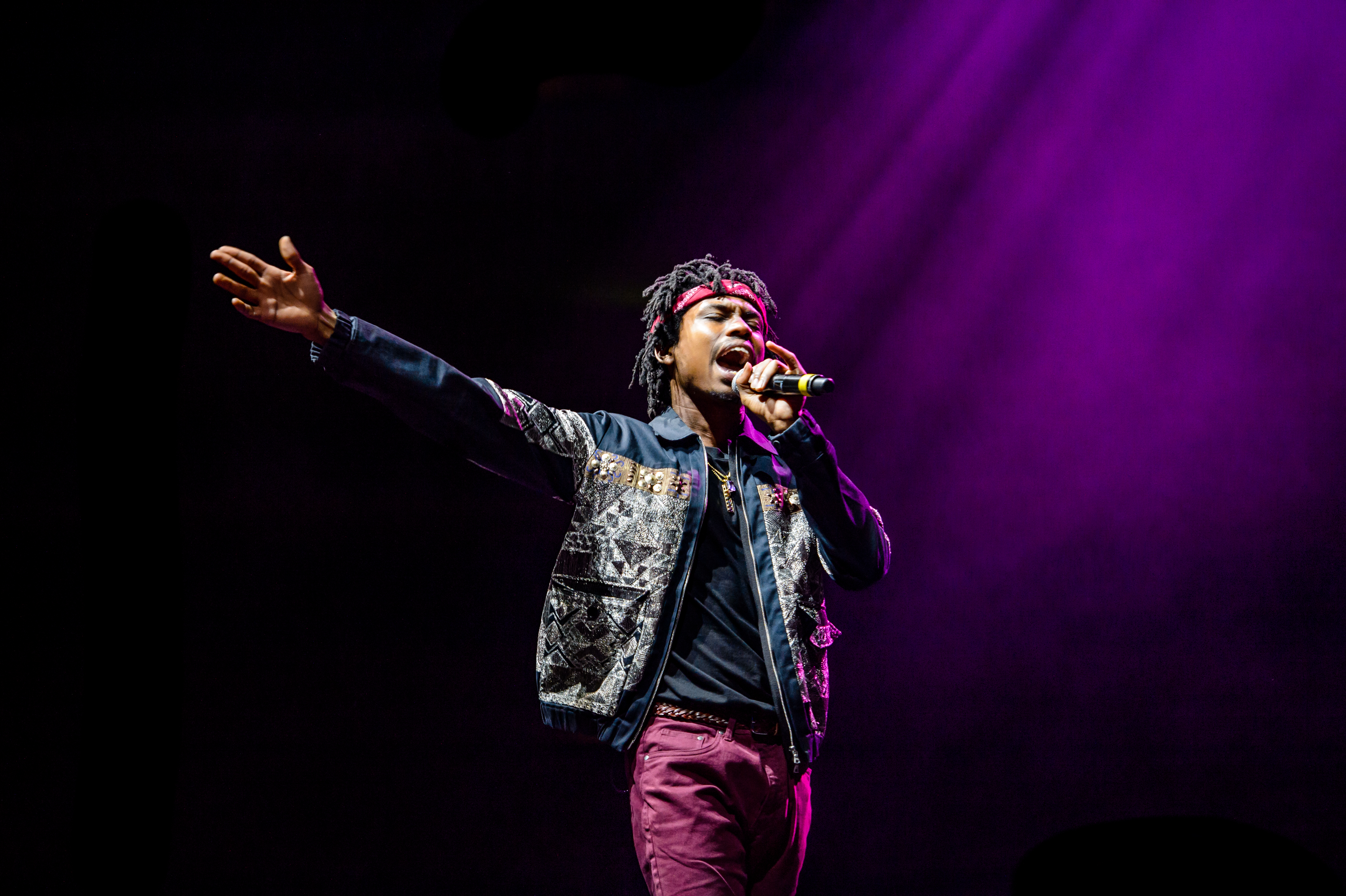
Raury performing in 2016

On August 25, 2014, Raury released his first mixtape, titled Indigo Child. On the same year, he announced that he signed a deal with Columbia Records. In 2014, he was shortlisted for the BBC's Sound of 2015. In 2014, New Zealand singer Lorde invited Raury to contribute his vocals on the song "Lost Souls", which was included on the soundtrack for The Hunger Games: Mockingjay Part 1. In January 2015, he was placed at number 4 on the list for the BBC's Sound of 2015. In 2015, Raury was featured on the cover of XXL magazine for the 2015 Freshman Class. On October 16, 2015, Raury released his debut studio album, titled All We Need. His song, called "Crystal Express" (which was taken from his album All We Need) appeared on the video game FIFA 16. "Devils Whisper" (which also was taken from his album All We Need) was used for the trailer of the popular Coronation Street storyline. In 2016, Raury went on tour as a support act for the rapper Macklemore. On September 15, 2016, Raury released a single called "Butterfly". The song "God's Whisper" appears in the motion pictures American Honey, Lucy, Collide, and the Netflix series Dark. The song "Devil's Whisper" appeared in the film Logan. On November 17, 2017, Raury appeared on Jaden Smith's album Syre, in the song "Falcon". As of 2018, it has been confirmed that Raury is no longer signed by the Columbia Records label. In an interview conducted by DJ Booth Raury stated that, "I went to Coachella without any support from the label. It was like they were trying to put me in a position of fear and weakness so I could run out of money and they could control me". On February 17, 2018, Raury released his latest single called "Odyssey" on his SoundCloud.

On April 20, 2018, Raury released a project titled The Woods for free.

In 2019, Raury released a self produced album titled Fervent under his record company "Into the Woods". He released a project titled Strawberry Moon under said record company on June 14, 2022.

== Artistry ==
Raury is known for his eclectic sound mixing soul, hip hop and folk. He has stated that he is influenced by André 3000, Kid Cudi, Kanye West, Bon Iver, Queen, Fleet Foxes, Marvin Gaye, and Father John Misty.

== Discography ==
=== Studio albums ===
List of albums, with selected chart positions
Title	Details	Peak chart positions				
Title	Details	US	US R&B/HH	US Alt.	AUS	UK
All We Need	Released: October 16, 2015; Label: Columbia; Format: CD, LP, digital download	78	16	15	46	152
The Woods	Released: April 21, 2018; Label: Self-released; Format: digital download	—	—	—	—	—
Fervent	Released: October 13, 2019; Label: The Woods; Format: digital download	—	—	—	—	—
Strawberry Moon	Released: June 14, 2022; Label: The Woods; Format: digital download	—	—	—	—	—
Strawberry Moon Eclipsed	Released: July 7, 2023; Label: The Woods; Format: digital download	—	—	—	—	—
Transcendence	Released: March 21, 2024; Label: The Woods; Format: digital download	—	—	—	—	—
Southern Mystic	Released: June 21, 2024; Label: The Woods; Format: digital download	—	—	—	—	—
The Blue Shell Theory	Released: December 1, 2024; Label: The Woods; Format: digital download	—	—	—	—	—

=== Mixtapes ===
List of mixtapes, with selected information
Title	Details
Indigo Child	Released: August 25, 2014; Label: Columbia Records; Format: Digital download

=== Singles ===
==== As lead artist ====
List of singles as lead artist, showing year released and album name
Title	Year	Album
"Friends" (featuring Tom Morello)	2015	All We Need

==== As featured artist ====
List of singles as a featured artist, showing year released and album name
Title	Year	Album
"Falcon" (Jaden Smith featuring Raury)	2017	Syre
"Endless Summer" (Jaden Smith featuring Raury)	2020	CTV3: Cool Tape Vol.3

=== Guest appearances ===
List of non-single guest appearances, with other performing artists, showing year released and album name
Title	Year	Other artist(s)	Album
"Higher"	2014	SBTRKT	Wonder Where We Land
"Forgotten"	2014	SBTRKT	Wonder Where We Land
"Dead People"	2015	Gucci Mane	1017 Mafia: Incarcerated
"Escape 120"	2015	Joey Bada$$	B4.Da.$$
"Miracle"	2015	Donnie Trumpet & The Social Experiment	Surf
"Blessing"	2016	Chance the Rapper, Ty Dolla Sign, BJ the Chicago Kid, Anderson Paak	Coloring Book
"Diddy Bop"	2016	Noname, Cam O'Bi	Telefone
"Losing Your Mind"	2016	Jaden Smith	The Get Down
"Nobody Tell a Name"	2017	Taylor Bennett	Restoration of an American Idol
