= Babe Rainbow (band) =

Australian psychedelic rock band

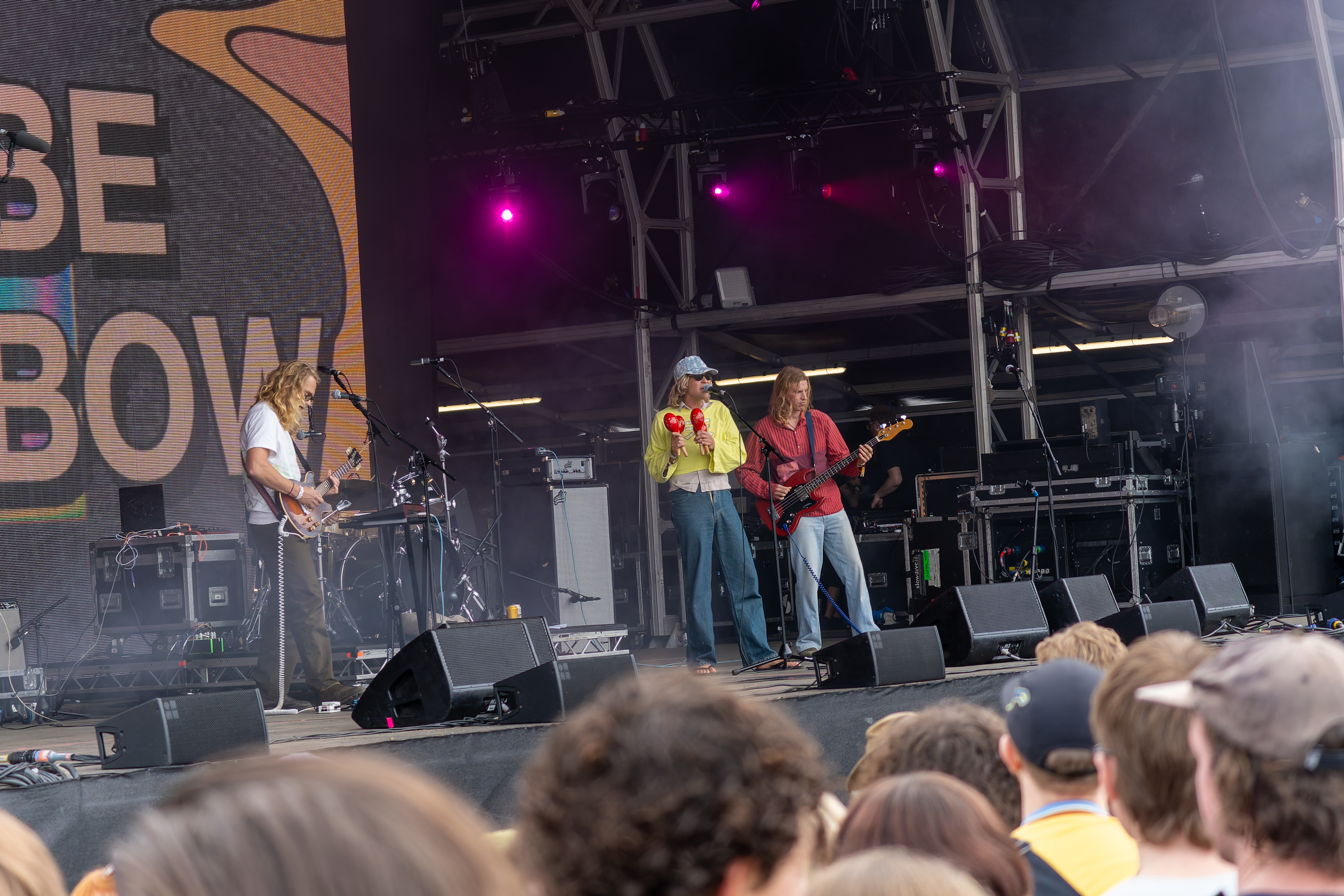
- Babe Rainbow performing at Wide Awake Festival in London, May 2024

Background information
- Also known as: The Babe Rainbow
- Origin: Byron Bay, New South Wales, Australia
- Genres: Psychedelic rock; soft rock; neo-psychedelia; surf music
- Years active: 2014–present
- Labels: Flightless; 30th Century Records; p(doom)
- Members: Angus Dowling; Jack "Cool-Breeze" Crowther; Elliot "Dr. Love Wisdom" O'Reilly; Miles Myjavec
- Past members: Lu-Lu-Felix Domingo
- Website: thebaberainbow.bandcamp.com

Babe Rainbow are an Australian psychedelic rock band from Byron Bay, New South Wales. The band has been characterised by their "throw-back" style of 1960s psychedelic rock along with their surf culture imagery. The band was conceived in 2014 in Rainbow Bay by Angus Dowling and Jack Crowther, who met during high school. Finding an interest in psychedelic music, they formed officially in 2015 along with Elliot O'Reilly, whom they met working as farmers in Duranbah, along with Venezuelan-born bass player Lu-Lu Felix Domingo.

The band collaborated with King Gizzard & the Lizard Wizard on their debut album, The Babe Rainbow, being later signed to the Flightless and 30th Century Records labels. In 2018, Babe Rainbow's second studio album, Double Rainbow, debuted at no. 18 on the ARIA Albums Chart. Miles Myjavec joined as a drummer around this time. The band has also collaborated with American artist Jaden Smith. As of 2024, the band has released six full-length albums, along with three EPs. The band has also ventured more into soft rock with influences from Latin music.

== History ==
Babe Rainbow was initially conceived in 2014 by Angus Dowling and Jack Crowther in the coastal surf town of Rainbow Bay. Both met each other in high school in the coastal town of Byron Bay, New South Wales. Dowling's parents are from Byron, where Crowther's mother is from a neighbouring town in the same region. Both Dowling and Crowther were students of English and enjoyed permaculture and surfing. They found interest in 1960s psychedelic music such as The Incredible String Band and Swing Mademoiselle. The group was later formed in 2015 with Elliot O'Reilly alongside Venezuelan-born bass player Lu-Lu Felix Domingo, who they met in the African quarter of Paris. The group worked as macadamia nut farmers for John Cuts near Tropical Fruit World in Duranbah.

Babe Rainbow wrote and recorded their first release in a second-hand bookstore in Murwillumbah. The group came to the attention of Stu Mackenzie from the Australian psychedelic band King Gizzard & the Lizard Wizard, who offered to produce their debut album. They collaborated with them for their self-titled debut album, The Babe Rainbow. They were signed to their label, Flightless. In 2017, they released their debut album produced by Mackenzie and ran support tours with King Gizzard, Allah-Las, Tomorrows Tulips, and French synth wave band La Femme internationally. Their debut album was signed to 30th Century Records, followed by Double Rainbow in 2018, which debuted at no. 18 on the ARIA Albums Chart, along with Today in 2019. Wollongong surfer Miles Myjavec joined as a drummer around this time. Their 2021 album, Changing Colours, featured American artist Jaden Smith, who connected with the band on Instagram after hearing a song from their 2019 albumToday.

In 2024 the band announced they would be signing with King Gizzard & the Lizard Wizard's p(doom) records, releasing a pair of singles; LONG LIVE THE WILDERNESS and Like Cleopatra, that will also be in their upcoming LP Slipper imp and shakaerator that was April 4 2025.

Babe Rainbow are set to release their seventh album Acid and Honey on 16th July 2026, the release has been preceded by the singles Acid and Honey, Polymuscalsaccharide and Waterfall.

== Artistry ==
Babe Rainbow is characterized by their "throw-back" 1960s style of psychedelic rock along with their surf culture imagery. It has also been characterized of having influences of disco, surf, funk, jazz, soul, garage and indie, with neo-hippie and neo-psychedelia. The band has also ventured into soft rock and Latin music influences, since Domingo is from Venezuela.

== Discography ==
=== Albums ===
List of albums, with selected details
Title	Details
The Babe Rainbow	Released: 1 September 2017; Format: digital, CD, LP; Label: Eureka, Flightless (FLT-029)
Double Rainbow	Released: 13 July 2018; Format: digital, CD, LP; Label: Eureka, Flightless (FLT-039)
Today	Released: 20 September 2019; Format: digital, CD, LP; Label: Eureka, Flightless (FLT-055)
Changing Colours	Released: 14 May 2021; Format: digital, LP; Label: Eureka, Flightless (FLT-079)
The Organic Band	Released: 14 October 2022; Format: digital; Label: Eureka, Flightless
Slipper Imp and Shakaerator	Released: 4 April 2025; Format: digital, LP; Label: p(doom)
Acid and Honey	Released: 16 July 2026; Format: digital, LP; Label: p(doom)

=== Extended plays ===
List of EPs, with selected details
Title	Details
The Babe Rainbow	Released: 10 July 2015; Format: digital, LP; Label: Eureka, Flightless (FLT-018)
Fresh As a Head of Lettuce	Released: 23 June 2023; Format: digital, LP; Label: Eureka (EUREKA007)
Mushroom	Released: 22 September 2023; Format: digital, LP; Label: Eureka

=== Live albums ===
List of live albums, with selected details
Title	Details
Levitation Sessions	Released: 15 April 2022; Format: digital, LP, cassette; Label: The Reverberation Appreciation Society
