= Erys =

- Standard edition cover; deluxe edition features Smith sitting up on the couch

Studio album by Jaden
- Released: July 5, 2019
- Recorded: 2017–2019
- Genres: Emo rap; Pop
- Length: 78:02
- Labels: MSFTSMusic; Roc Nation; Republic
- Producers: yuki; Ayo; Christian Rich; Cubeatz; Dinuzzo; DJ Ammo; Fabio Aguilar; FnZ; Frank Dukes; Gabe Basso; Heavy Mellow; HWLS; Jaden; Jasper Harris; Josiah Bell; Keanu Beats; Keeley; Keyz; LASTNGHT; Lido; Nick Stoubis; Omarhu Akbar; OmArr; Samuel Ray; Tay Keith; ¿Téo?; Tyler Cole; Unxque; Young Fyre

Jaden chronology
Erys Is Coming (2019)	Erys (2019)	CTV3: Cool Tape Vol. 3 (2020)

Singles from Erys
- 1. "Again" Released: July 2, 2019

Erys (stylized in all caps and pronounced "Iris") is the second studio album by American rapper Jaden, released on July 5, 2019, through MSFTSMusic and Roc Nation. It is the follow-up to 2017's Syre, and features collaborations with Tyler, the Creator, Trinidad James, ASAP Rocky, Kid Cudi, Lido, and Willow. The lead single "Again" was released on July 2.

== Background ==
Following the release of his debut studio album Syre in 2017, Jaden announced the follow-up Erys in December of the same year. In September 2018, Smith told Zane Lowe that while he likes "to do it all" and "experiment", "the people have spoken on what they like from me so I try to come really, really hard", describing Erys as a "strict, hard rap album". He went on to say that "every song, back to back, [will be] high tempo, [and have] a lot of bass like just crazy".

== Composition ==
Erys resumes the narrative from Jaden's previous album, Syre. A boy who is obsessed with chasing the sunset then is chased it, and it kills him. Erys is a now resurrected part of Syre. The album portrays Erys as a boy whose ego has gotten the best of him. He is characterized as an ill-mannered person who contrasts with the main character of the album Syre.

== Promotion ==
In April 2019, Smith released the three-track EP Erys Is Coming, and in June, debuted the song "Summertime in Paris" with sister Willow on The Ellen DeGeneres Show.

The song "On My Own" was featured in the PlayStation 4/PlayStation 5 video game Marvel's Spider-Man: Miles Morales.

== Critical reception ==
Professional ratings
Aggregate scores
Source	Rating
Metacritic	58/100
Review scores
Source	Rating
AllMusic	3.5/5 stars
Exclaim!	6/10
The Guardian	2/5 stars
Highsnobiety	3.5/5 stars
HipHopDX	2.9/5
Pitchfork	4.7/10

Upon its release, Erys received generally mixed reviews from contemporary music critics.

== Commercial performance ==
In the United States, Erys debuted at number 12 on the US Billboard 200 chart, earning 23,932 album-equivalent units, with 4,036 coming from pure album sales in its first week.

== Track listing ==
Credits adapted from Apple Music's metadata.

No.	Title	Writer(s)	Producer(s)	Length
1.	"P"	Jaden Smith; Peder Losnegård; Willow Smith	Lido; Heavy Mellow; Yuki	2:48
2.	"I"	J. Smith; Jasper Harris; Losnegård	Lido; Harris	2:10
3.	"N"	J. Smith; Losnegård; Tyler Cole; Mateo Arias	Lido	3:51
4.	"K" (with Lido)	J. Smith; Losnegård; Harrison Rhodes; Zach Tabori	Lido	4:40
5.	"Noize" (featuring Tyler, the Creator)	J. Smith; Omarr Rambert; Austin Owens; Keanu Torres; James Foye III; Tyler Okonma	Ayo; Keyz; Keanu Beats	4:07
6.	"i-drip-or-is"	J. Smith; Rambert; Chan; Owens; Torres; Foye III	Ayo; Keyz; Keanu Beats; Yuki; Fabio Aguilar	3:57
7.	"Again" (featuring Syre)	J. Smith; Chan	Yuki	4:29
8.	"Got It"	J. Smith; Brytavious Chambers	Tay Keith; Cubeatz	1:16
9.	"Fire Dept"	J. Smith; Mike Musselman; Tabori; Chan	Jaden	1:42
10.	"Mission" (with Trinidad James)	J. Smith; Tremaine Winfrey; Rambert; Chan; Nicholaus Williams	Young Fyre; OmArr; Yuki; Unxque	4:11
11.	"Summertime in Paris" (featuring Willow)	J. Smith; Josiah Bell; Cole; Rambert; W. Smith; Arias; Wu Yi Fan	Josiah Bell; OmArr	4:30
12.	"Blackout"	J. Smith; Chan	Yuki	6:40
13.	"Pain"	J. Smith; Cole; Barbara Pravi; Chan; Melanie Pereira	Yuki; Jaden	6:15
14.	"Chateau" (featuring ASAP Rocky)	J. Smith; Winfrey; Rambert; Rakim Mayers; Kuwanna Moore	Young Fyre; OmArr	2:15
15.	"On My Own" (featuring Kid Cudi)	J. Smith; Kyle Edwards; Rambert; Scott Mescudi; Darrien Overton	LASTNGHT; Dinuzzo; OmArr	4:04
16.	"Riot"	J. Smith; Chan	Yuki	4:34
17.	"Erys"	J. Smith; Gabe Basso; Nick Stoubis; Cole; Arias; Samuel Ray	Jaden; Nick Stoubis; Gabe Basso; Samuel Ray	7:51
Total length:				69:20

Deluxe edition bonus tracks
No.	Title	Writer(s)	Producer(s)	Length
1.	"Beautiful Disruption"	J. Smith; Rambert; Edwards; Damien Leroy; Adam Feeney	LASTNGHT; Keeley; Omarhu Akbar; OmArr; Frank Dukes; DJ Ammo^{[a]}	2:18
2.	"Somebody Else"	J. Smith; Basso; Stoubis; Cole; Arias; Ray	Jaden	3:42
3.	"Ghost" (remix, featuring ASAP Rocky)	J. Smith; Rambert; Kehinde Hassan; Taiwo Hassan; Michael Mule; Isaac De Boni; Justin Elwin; Mayers	Christian Rich; FNZ; HWLS	2:42
Total length:				78:02

Notes

- ^{^[a]} signifies a co-producer
- "Beautiful Disruption" previously appeared in the EP Erys Is Coming.
- "Noize" and "Erys" are stylized in all caps.
- "P" features additional vocals by Teo, Willow, and Lido.
- "N" features additional vocals by Tyler Cole, Teo, and Willow.
- "K" features additional vocals by Teo, Harry Hudson, Willow, and Lido.
- "Noize", "i-drip-or-is", "Riot", and "Beautiful Disruption" features additional vocals by OmArr.
- "Summertime in Paris" features additional vocals by Kris Wu, Teo, and Josiah Bell.
- "Pain" features additional vocals by Barbara Pravi and November Ultra.
- "Beautiful Disruption" features uncredited additional vocals and additional production from Omarhu Akbar
- "Somebody Else" features additional vocals by Willow.

Sample credits

- "Beautiful Disruption" contains a sample from "Emotionally Better 164", written by Adam Feeney, and performed by Frank Dukes.

== Charts ==
Chart (2019)	Peak position
Australian Albums (ARIA)	34
Belgian Albums (Ultratop Flanders)	129
Belgian Albums (Ultratop Wallonia)	196
Canadian Albums (Billboard)	18
Dutch Albums (Album Top 100)	38
French Albums (SNEP)	134
Irish Albums (IRMA)	97
Lithuanian Albums (AGATA)	65
New Zealand Albums (RMNZ)	25
Swiss Albums (Schweizer Hitparade)	62
UK Albums (Official Charts)	62
US Billboard 200	12
US Top R&B/Hip-Hop Albums (Billboard)	8
