= Jaden Smith =

American rapper and actor (born 1998)

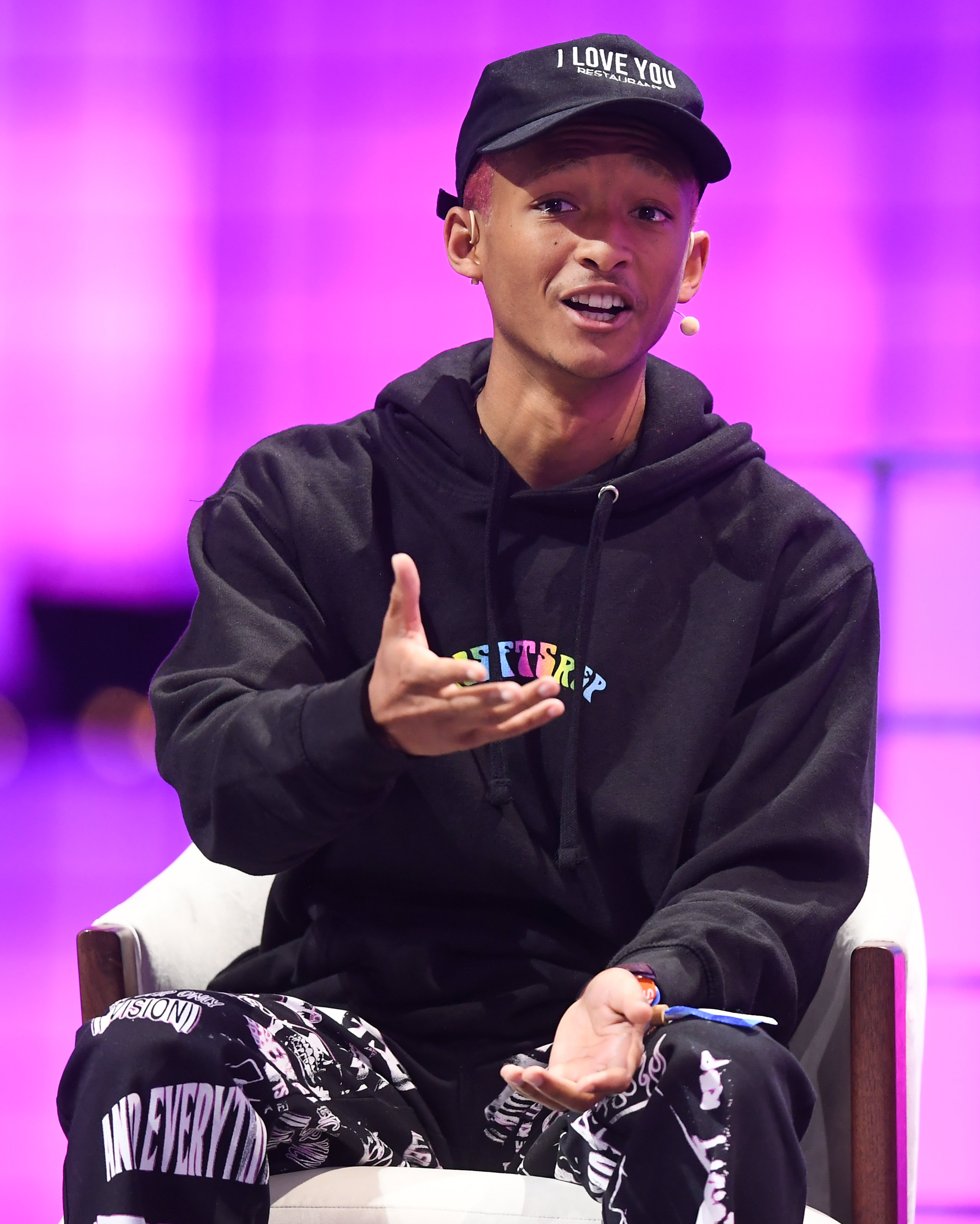
- Smith at Web Summit in 2019
- Born: Jaden Christopher Syre Smith; July 8, 1998 (age 28); Malibu, California, U.S.
- Occupations: Rapper; singer; songwriter; actor; dancer
- Years active: 2002–present
- Parents: Will Smith (father); Jada Pinkett Smith (mother)
- Relatives: Willow Smith (sister)
- Musical career
- Genres: Alternative hip hop; emo rap
- Instrument: Vocals
- Labels: Columbia; Roc Nation; MSFTSMusic; gamma.; Three Six Zero
- Website: jadensmith.com

Jaden Christopher Syre Smith (born July 8, 1998) is an American rapper, singer, songwriter, actor, and dancer. The son of Jada Pinkett-Smith and Will Smith, he made his film debut alongside his father in the 2006 film The Pursuit of Happyness, and appeared with his father once more in the film After Earth (2013). Smith also co-starred in the remake films The Day the Earth Stood Still (2008), alongside Keanu Reeves, and The Karate Kid (2010), with Jackie Chan. He is also known for his work in the two-part Netflix television series The Get Down (2016) and for voicing the character Kaz Kaan in the anime series, Neo Yokio.

As a recording artist, Smith first guest performed on Canadian singer Justin Bieber's 2010 single, "Never Say Never". Released for The Karate Kid's accompanying soundtrack, the song peaked within the top ten of the Billboard Hot 100 and received quintuple platinum certification by the Recording Industry Association of America (RIAA). He later released multiple mixtapes, including CTV2 (2014). Following a three-year work effort, he signed with Roc Nation and Interscope Records to release the studio albums, Syre (2017), Erys (2019) and CTV3: Cool Tape Vol. 3 (2020), all of which entered the Top 40 on the U.S. Billboard 200. In 2022, he was nominated for a Grammy Award for Album of the Year as a featured artist on Bieber's album Justice.

In September 2025, Smith was appointed Creative Director of Christian Louboutin, making him the brand's first male creative director.

== Early life ==
Jaden Christopher Syre Smith was born July 8, 1998, in Malibu, California, the son of actors Jada Pinkett Smith and Will Smith. He has an older half-brother, Trey Smith (b. 1992) and a younger sister, Willow Smith (b. 2000). He attended New Village Leadership Academy before being homeschooled by his parents. Growing up, his fame and his family's celebrity status prevented him from having a normal childhood, something he has spoken on at length. He took up skateboarding.

Smith and his siblings were youth ambassadors for Project Zambi, which, in conjunction with Hasbro, helps Zambian children orphaned by AIDS.

== Career ==
=== Acting ===
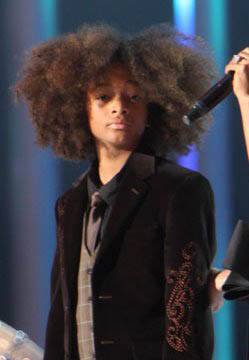
Smith in 2009

Smith made his major role debut in the 2006 film The Pursuit of Happyness as Christopher, the son of Chris Gardner, Will Smith's character. For the role, he won the Breakthrough Performance Award at the 2007 MTV Movie Awards. He next appeared as Jacob in the 2008 Scott Derrickson science fiction film The Day the Earth Stood Still, a remake of the 1951 classic of the same name.

In 2010, with Jackie Chan, Smith starred in The Karate Kid, a remake of the 1984 film. In May 2013, Will Smith and Jaden starred together, as father and son, in After Earth. In 2014, it was announced that Smith would return for the sequel Karate Kid 2 with Jackie Chan, to be directed by Breck Eisner, produced by James Lassiter and Will Smith, and written by Zak Penn.

In April 2014, Smith was cast in the film The Good Lord Bird, based on the 2013 novel of the same name by James McBride. Smith plays Henry Shackleford, a young slave living in the antebellum Kansas Territory in 1857 who encounters abolitionist John Brown.

Smith took a break from acting following the release of his mixtape Cool Tape Vol. 2 to focus on music. He then returned to act in the Netflix original The Get Down in 2017. He also had a voice-acting role in Neo Yokio and a role in Nashville as himself. Commenting on his break from acting, he said, "The kinds of roles I was being offered weren't exactly what I was looking for, nothing felt really necessary that I needed to be in until this came along". Smith returned to acting in films with the February 2018 announcement of a film based on skateboarding. On June 21, 2018, Crystal Moselle's Skate Kitchen released its first official trailer with Smith as the main character. It was released on August 10, 2018, after screening at the Sundance Film Festival in the winter of 2017. In 2020, he starred with Cara Delevingne in the romantic drama Life in a Year, to positive reviews.

=== Music ===
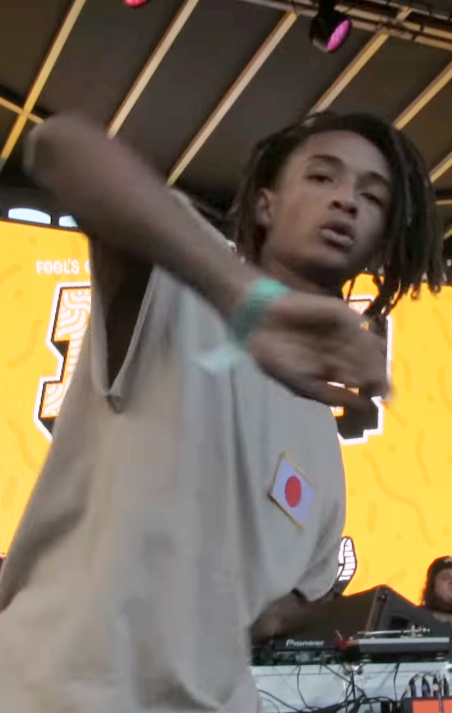
Smith performing in 2015

In 2010, Smith rapped alongside Canadian singer Justin Bieber in the song "Never Say Never". It peaked at No. 8 on the Billboard Hot 100 and was certified 5× Platinum in the US.

On October 1, 2012, Smith released his debut mixtape, The Cool Cafe. He released the sequel to The Cool Cafe on November 8, 2014, titled CTV2.

Smith started working on his debut studio album in 2014, a process that took three years. He announced in December 2016 that it would be titled Syre. The lead single from Syre, "Fallen", was released on December 5, 2016, and three more singles were released—"Batman" and "Watch Me" and "Falcon"—on July 14 on November 16, 2017, respectively. Syre was released on November 17, 2017, and debuted at No. 24 on the US Billboard 200. "Icon" was released as a single on the same day, reaching No. 3 on the Bubbling Under Hot 100 Singles chart.

Smith later announced on December 14, 2017, that his next project following Syre would be titled Erys. Another project, Syre: The Electric Album, was later teased via Twitter. Leading up to the release of the project, Smith released the single "Ghost" featuring Christian Rich. On July 8, 2018, Smith released the project exclusively on Instagram on his 20th birthday. The project was later released four days later to streaming platforms. Syre: The Electric Album is a guitar-centric rework of Smith's studio album Syre and is influenced by Jimi Hendrix and The Beatles' Sgt. Pepper's Lonely Hearts Club Band. Less than a year later, on July 5, 2019, Smith released his second studio album, Erys, which debuted at No. 12 on the US Billboard 200.

On July 30, 2018, Smith was announced as an opener during J. Cole's KOD Tour alongside Young Thug and EarthGang, and on August 2, he performed for the first time at Lollapalooza. One of Smith's influences, Kid Cudi, stated that he would like to make an album with Smith, which Smith supported during an interview on August 21, 2018.

Jaden was managed by Will Smith's management company, Westbrook Entertainment, until March 2019 when Three Six Zero, an established management firm, acquired Westbrook. Following the acquisition, on July 24, 2020, Smith released the single "Cabin Fever", from his third album CTV3: Cool Tape Vol. 3, which he described as a completion of the trilogy of the previous Cool tapes and "also kinda completing the trilogies of Syre and Erys at the same time". The album includes a collaboration with Smith's friend and previous collaborator Justin Bieber on the song "Falling for You". On June 21, 2021, Smith released the single "Bye". On August 27, 2021, Smith released another version of the album CTV3: Day Tripper's Edition on all streaming platforms.

=== Fashion ===
GQ described Smith in 2018 as "in a league of his own" in terms of fashion and a "superstar who has taken fashion to an entirely different level". Smith has called Tyler the Creator, Batman, and Poseidon his icons when it comes to fashion. Smith said that Tyler the Creator introduced him to the brand Supreme. Batman's dark, gothic scenery has influenced the clothing he has created through his brand MSFTSrep, as well as his personal clothing style, wearing Batman protective armor to Kanye West's and Kim Kardashian's wedding and his prom. In May 2013, Smith collaborated with a Korean designer named Choi Bum Suk to create a pop-up retail store at which customers could buy clothes featuring their collaborative logos.

In 2016, Smith modeled in a womenswear campaign for Louis Vuitton wearing a skirt. Explaining his choice to wear a skirt, he said he was attempting to combat bullying, saying, "In five years, when a kid goes to school wearing a skirt, he won't get beat up and kids won't get mad at him." Smith continued to wear womenswear throughout the rest of 2016. He was the first male model to model womenswear for Louis Vuitton. He created a denim line with fashion brand G-Star in 2018.

In September 2025, Smith was appointed Creative Director of Christian Louboutin, making him the brand's first male creative director. In the role, Smith would be tasked with shaping four collections annually across men's shoes, leather goods, and accessories.

=== Just Water ===
Smith has been a partner in spring water company Just Water since he was 12 years old. The company is attempting to create a water filtration system anyone can afford for use in disadvantaged regions and nations; it also seeks to aid in the development of water infrastructure and the creation of environmentally-friendly construction methods, producing a novel drywall design. Just Water launched officially in the UK on August 27, 2018.

== Musical artistry and influences ==
Smith's influences include Kid Cudi, Kanye West, Kurt Cobain and Tycho. He also considers his father, Will Smith, an inspiration, saying: "He started in music and transitioned to movies. I started with movies, and then I transitioned into making music—I look at him and use it as a blueprint of how good of a person he is, but not necessarily the success that he reached."

== Personal life ==
Jaden Smith's father, Will, revealed that his son sought an emancipation ruling as a present for his 15th birthday. Will told the media that Jaden's primary motivation was the establishment of his own residence and also explained that his children were not subject to strict parenting: "We generally don't believe in punishment. From the time Jaden was five or six, we would sit him down, and all he has to do is be able to explain why what he did was the right thing for his life." However, Smith and his father appeared together on The Ellen DeGeneres Show on May 15, 2013, where Jaden joked:

The thing that people don't get is everything at his house is free. So I can get anything and everything at his house, so I'm going to be there for 20, 30 more years. He [Will Smith] says that as soon as I have a movie that's bigger than one of his movies I can get my own house.

In June 2017, at the age of 19, Smith moved out of his parents' house and into a $4 million home in Hidden Hills, California.

Smith is a vegetarian. In 2019, he started a mobile restaurant providing free vegan dinners for people experiencing homelessness (but where others pay). In September 2019, his parents, Will Smith and Jada Pinkett Smith, said on Red Table Talk that they had staged an "intervention" after Jaden appeared visibly underweight and "drained". Jaden said in the same episode that he had been eating only one or two meals a day, and a physician on the program attributed his nutritional deficiencies to a sensitive stomach. He was subsequently diagnosed with lactose intolerance and celiac disease. He later returned to vegetarianism.

In 2013, Smith criticized traditional education and advised people to drop out of school. Discussing teenagers who attend public school, he said, "Kids who go to normal school are so teenagery, so angsty." Smith subscribes to, and tweets about, numerous conspiracy theories, including the Illuminati and chemtrails hypotheses.

Smith dated Sarah Snyder from 2015 to 2017. She inspired numerous songs on Smith's debut album, Syre. Beginning in November 2018, Smith claimed that rapper Tyler, the Creator was his boyfriend. Tyler, who is bisexual, denied this claim. In the song "Noize" on Erys in 2019, Tyler revealed, while rapping, that their relationship claims were sarcastic.

Smith has been called a non-binary icon for his work in popular media, challenging traditional gender roles. He is often seen in gender-fluid clothing, wearing dresses, skirts, and high-heeled shoes. For his Vogue Korea editorial in 2016, he wore traditionally female attire: a black skirt, blue nail polish, and a flower in his hair. He has made public comments such as "If I Wanna Wear A Dress, Then I Will, And That Will Set The New Wave...". He said that he wore skirts primarily to help kids to be bullied less in schools.

In 2023, Smith was the subject of an online death hoax after Facebook posts and YouTube videos claimed that he had died. Posts on various social media platforms claimed that Will Smith publicly announced the death of his son.

== Discography ==
=== Studio albums ===
- Syre (2017)
- Erys (2019)
- CTV3: Cool Tape Vol. 3 (2020)

== Tours ==
=== Headlining ===
- Vision Tour: A North American Journey (2018)

=== Co-headlining ===
- Willow & Erys Tour (with Willow Smith) (2019)

=== Supporting ===
- Fall Out Boy – Mania Tour (2017)
- J. Cole – KOD Tour (2018)
- Post Malone – Beerbongs & Bentleys Tour (2019)
- Tyler, the Creator – Igor Tour (2019)
- Justin Bieber – Justice World Tour (2022)

== Filmography ==
=== Film ===
Year	Title	Role	Notes
2006	The Pursuit of Happyness (Note: Credited as Jaden Christopher Syre Smith.)	Christopher Gardner Jr.	Teen Choice Award for Choice Movie Chemistry; MTV Movie Award for Breakthrough Performance; PFCS Award for Best Performance by Youth in a Leading or Supporting Role – Male; Nominated — Teen Choice Award for Choice Movie Breakout Male; Nominated — NAACP Image Award for Outstanding Supporting Actor in a Motion Picture; Nominated — Black Reel Award for Best Breakthrough Performance; Nominated — Broadcast Film Critics Association Award for Best Young Actor
2008	The Day the Earth Stood Still	Jacob Benson Jr.	Saturn Award for Best Performance by a Young Actor
2010	The Karate Kid	Dre Parker	BET Award for YoungStars Award; Young Artist Award for Best Leading Young Actor in a Feature Film; Nominated — Teen Choice Award for Choice Summer Movie Star – Male; Nominated — Kids Choice Award for Favorite Movie Actor; Nominated — MTV Movie Award for Biggest Badass Star; Nominated — NAACP Image Award for Outstanding Actor in a Motion Picture; Nominated — Black Reel Award for Best Actor; Nominated — Black Reel Award for Best Song; Nominated — Empire Award for Best Newcomer
2011	Justin Bieber: Never Say Never	Himself	
2013	After Earth	Kitai Raige	Golden Raspberry Award for Worst Actor; Golden Raspberry Award for Worst Screen Combo (w/ Will Smith); Nominated—MTV Movie Award for Summer's Biggest Teen Bad Ass Star
2018	Skate Kitchen	Devon	
2020	Justin Bieber: Seasons	Himself	Cameo
2020	Impractical Jokers: The Movie	Himself	
2020	Life in a Year	Daryn	
2021	A Man Named Scott	Himself	
2024	K-Pops!	Himself	Cameo

=== Television ===
Year	Title	Role	Notes
2003–2006	All of Us	Reggie	Recurring role (6 episodes)
2008	The Suite Life of Zack & Cody	Travis	Episode: "Romancing the Phone"
2016–2017	The Get Down	Marcus "Dizzee" Kipling	Recurring role (11 episodes)
2017	Neo Yokio	Kaz Kaan	Voice; main role
2017	Nashville	Himself	
2022	The Proud Family: Louder and Prouder	College Myron	Voice; episode: "When You Wish Upon a Roker"
2022	Entergalactic	Jordan	Voice; television special
2023	The Eric Andre Show	Himself	Episode: "Old Yeller"
