= Syre (album) =

Studio album by Jaden Smith
- Released: November 17, 2017
- Recorded: 2014–2017
- Genres: Alternative hip-hop; progressive rap
- Length: 70:29
- Labels: MSFTSMusic; Roc Nation; Interscope; Republic
- Producers: Lido; Melvin Lewis; OmArr; Tim Suby; Young Fyre; Josiah Bell; Teo; IQ; $y; Christian Rich; Wanderlust; Jaden

Jaden Smith chronology
This Is the Album (2015)	Syre (2017)	Syre: The Electric Album (2018)

Singles from Syre
- 1. "Fallen" Released: December 5, 2016; 2. "Batman" Released: July 14, 2017; 3. "Watch Me" Released: July 14, 2017; 4. "Falcon" Released: November 16, 2017; 5. "Icon" Released: November 17, 2017

Syre (stylized as SYRE and SYRE: A Beautiful Confusion) is the debut studio album by American rapper Jaden Smith. A visual album, it was released on November 17, 2017, through MSFTSMusic and Roc Nation under the partnership between Interscope Records and Republic Records. The album debuted at number 24 on the U.S. Billboard 200 for the chart dated December 9, 2017. It features appearances from ASAP Rocky and Raury, along with additional vocals from Kevin Abstract, Pia Mia, and Jaden’s sister Willow Smith.

== Background ==
The album was teased after the release of Jaden's music video for "Fallen" back in December 2016. The album title is a reference to his full name Jaden Christopher Syre Smith. In an interview with Complex about the album title, Jaden said that:

Syre really just came to me one day. I didn’t know what I was going to call the album, but one day it really really came. I don’t know what happened. It was like a switch—from one second to another, my whole life switched. I realized that Syre was the answer, what I had to move forward with. People love to just talk about me by name and say, "Oh, Jaden Smith this, Jaden Smith that." It’s time for a new awakening and a new consciousness. Anybody who thinks they know me, this album is something completely different from what they think.

== Promotion ==
Following the announcement of the release date for Syre, Smith posted twelve visuals, including seven videos, to Instagram, forming the project's artwork when the thumbnails are viewed together. The center post is a video captioned, "The Syre Movie Trailer. Score By Ricky Eat Acid," and the other six videos are song teasers that conclude with title cards featuring the track names.

=== Accompanying film ===
Syre was intended to be accompanied by the release of a film either of the same title or titled The Syre Movie, to be scored by Ricky Eat Acid. As of 2026, the film has not been released and no updates have been given, however, it is possible that a compilation of the respective music videos comprise the totality of a film, categorizing it as a visual album.

=== Singles ===
"Fallen" was released as the lead single from the album on December 5, 2016.

"Batman" and "Watch Me" were released as the album's second and third single respectively on July 14, 2017.

"Falcon" was released as the album's fourth single on November 16, 2017. The song features a guest appearance from American singer Raury.

"Icon" was released as the album's fifth single on November 17, 2017, along with an accompanied music video. The song features background vocals from Will Smith. An official remix of the song featuring American singer-rapper Nicky Jam, with an accompanied music video was released on May 25, 2018.

== Composition ==
Talking to Vanity Fair, Smith said that Syre was inspired by Kanye West's The Life of Pablo and Frank Ocean's Blonde. Syre has been compared to a musical with multiple characters with the main character Syre being played by Jaden Smith as Syre experiences sadness, anger and regret following the breakdown of a relationship with references to Adam and Eve and the myth of Icarus. The album, which is over an hour long, chronicles Syre's coming of age. Speaking on the character, Smith said “It's really just become a legacy of this guy, this kid, who chases the sunset – and then one day, it chases him back and he can't get away – it really is the story of me coming to be a young adult, and it wasn't easy at all." The story also has mentions of Smith's personal life with a song dedicated to his ex-girlfriend, Sarah Snyder and his failure to dissociate with his father's fame.

The album is "full of soaring harmonies and dark, moody production" and combines "folk, metal, ‘70s rock, Christian pop and Detroit techno", with NME comparing it to putting a Spotify playlist on shuffle.

== Critical reception ==
Professional ratings
Aggregate scores
Source	Rating
Metacritic	69/100
Review scores
Source	Rating
AllMusic	3.5/5 stars
Exclaim!	8/10
HipHopDX	4.1/5
HotNewHipHop	60%
The Post	4/5 stars
NME	3/5 stars
Pitchfork	5.1/10
Salute	5/5 stars

Syre received generally positive reviews from music critics upon its release, At Metacritic, which assigns a normalized rating out of 100 to reviews from mainstream publications, the album received an average score of 69, based on six reviews. A. Harmony of Exclaim! determined, "Genre-fluid and dense, Jaden Smith's Roc Nation debut is a lot to process. SYRE changes shape in such a way that it plays like two distinct albums; it's a sonic playground, and Smith bounces from toy to toy, flexing his artistic muscle throughout." Kyle Eustice of HipHopDX praised the album's creativity, production, and commended Jaden's stylistic progressions and improvement from his past releases. In contrast, Pitchfork's Kevin Lozano criticized the rapping and lyrics, writing, "Full of chaotic beats and cringe-worthy lyrics, the debut studio album from Jaden Smith is a sophistic, paranoid fantasy that mixes new-age thinking with apocalyptic rhetoric."

== Commercial performance ==
In the United States, Syre debuted at number 24 on the Billboard 200 earning 20,467 album-equivalent units, with 3,813 coming from pure album sales.

== Track listing ==
Credits were adapted from Tidal.

No.	Title	Writer(s)	Producer(s)	Length
1.	"B"	Jaden Smith; Peder Losnegård	Lido	3:06
2.	"L"	Smith; Losnegård	Lido	2:23
3.	"U"	Smith; Losnegård	Lido	4:45
4.	"E"	Smith; Losnegård	Lido	3:23
5.	"Breakfast" (featuring ASAP Rocky)	Smith; Melvin Lewis; Omarr Rambert; Rakim Mayers	Lewis; OmArr	3:04
6.	"Hope"	Smith; Losnegård	Lido	6:00
7.	"Falcon" (featuring Raury)	Smith; Tim Suby; Raury Tullis	Suby	3:43
8.	"Ninety"	Smith; Losnegård	Lido	7:48
9.	"Lost Boy"	Smith; Mateo Arias; Rambert; Josiah Bell	Teo; OmArr; Bell	9:29
10.	"Batman"	Smith; Rambert; Tramaine Winfrey; Daniel Jose Fabrega	Young Fyre; OmArr^{[a]}	3:04
11.	"Icon"	Smith; Lewis; Rambert	Lewis; OmArr	3:40
12.	"Watch Me"	Smith; Rambert; Winfrey	Young Fyre; OmArr^{[a]}	2:34
13.	"Fallen"	Smith; T. Thompson	IQ	4:22
14.	"The Passion"	Smith; Rambert; Taiwo Hassan; Kehinde Hassan	Christian Rich; OmArr	4:29
15.	"George Jeff"	Smith; Rambert; Winfrey	OmArr; Young Fyre	2:17
16.	"Rapper"	Smith; Kevin Jacoutot	Wonderlust	2:20
17.	"Syre"	Smith	Smith; $y^{[a]}	3:54
Total length:				70:21

Notes

- ^{^[a]} signifies a co-producer
- "B" features vocals by Willow Smith and Pia Mia.
- "Fallen" features vocals from Kevin Abstract of Brockhampton.

Sample credits

- "U" contains samples from "Falling Down", written and performed by Lido.
- "E", "Falcon" and "Syre" contains samples from "Inside My House; Some Place I Keep Dreaming About", written and performed by Ricky Eat Acid.
- "Icon" contains samples from "The Hi De Ho Man", performed by Cab Calloway.
- "Watch Me" contains samples from "Black Skinhead", written by Kanye West, Guy-Manuel de Homem-Christo, Thomas Bangalter, Cydel Young, Malik Jones, Elon Rutberg, Wasalu Jaco, Sakiya Sandifer, Mike Dean, Derrick Watkins, and performed by Kanye West.

== Charts ==
Chart (2017)	Peak position
Belgian Albums (Ultratop Flanders)	80
Canadian Albums (Billboard)	32
Dutch Albums (Album Top 100)	63
French Albums (SNEP)	142
Latvian Albums (LaIPA)	47
New Zealand Albums (RMNZ)	33
UK Albums (Official Charts)	85
US Billboard 200	24
US Top R&B/Hip-Hop Albums (Billboard)	10

== Certifications ==
Region	Certification	Certified units/sales
New Zealand (RMNZ)	Gold	7,500^{‡}
United States (RIAA)	Gold	500,000^{‡}
^{‡} Sales+streaming figures based on certification alone.

== Release history ==
Release dates and formats for Syre
Region	Date	Label(s)	Format(s)	Edition(s)	Ref.
Various	November 17, 2017	MSFTSMusic; Roc Nation	Digital download; streaming	Standard	
Various	June 8, 2018	MSFTSMusic; Roc Nation	LP	Standard	
