= Christian Rich =

Nigerian production duo

- Born: Chicago, Illinois, U.S.
- Origin: Lagos, Nigeria
- Genres: Progressive rap
- Occupations: Producers; DJs; recording artists; songwriters
- Years active: 2003–present
- Members: Taiwo Hassan; Kehinde Hassan
- Website: christianrich.com

Christian Rich is an American-born Nigerian production and DJ duo consisting of twins Kehinde Hassan and Taiwo Hassan.

== Early life and career ==
The identical twin brothers were born in Chicago and raised in Nigeria for exposure to their father's Yoruba culture. By 2013 they contributed to Drake's #1 Billboard album Nothing Was the Same on the intro of "Pound Cake" which features Jay Z and produced “Crawl” for Childish Gambino's Because the Internet. They produced four tracks for Earl Sweatshirt's #1 Rap Billboard album Doris ("Chum", "Centurion", "Molasses", "Knight"), produced on J. Cole's Platinum, #1 Billboard album Born Sinner ("Sparks Will Fly") and earned a Grammy nomination with Childish Gambino. The brothers produced Vince Staples's big hit “Big Fish” and “Señorita”, Wale/G-Eazy's song “Fashion Week” and Marshmello/Juicy J's “You Can Cry”. They joined Jaden Smith on the joint single “GHOST”. They have production and writing credits with Snoh Aalegra, Juicy J, Anderson Paak and others.

== Discography ==
Year	Title	Artist	Album	Credit
2021	"Just Like That"	Snoh Aalegra	Temporary Highes In The Violet Skies	Producers
2020	"LABMO LIFE"	Die Antwoord	HOUSE OF ZEF	Producers
2020	"DA GODZ MUS B CRAZY"	Die Antwoord	HOUSE OF ZEF	Producers
2019	"Shibuya (Ghost II)" (featuring Jaden, Vic Mensa and Belly)	Christian Rich	Shibuya (Ghost II)	Artist & Producer
2019	"Ghost" (Remix featuring ASAP Rocky)	Jaden	Erys	Producer & Featured Artist
2018	"Christopher Nolan"	Yxng Bane	HBK	Producer
2018	"Breakfast Interlude Feat. Eyelar"	Yxng Bane	HBK	Producer
2018	"Evergreen"	James Davis	Lamplighter EP	Co-Producer
2018	"Pick Me Up"	James Davis	Lamplighter EP	Co-Producer
2018	"Its Me"	Nili Hadida	Nili Hadida	Producer/Writer
2018	"This Way"	Nili Hadida	Nili Hadida	Producer/Writer
2018	"Why Feel Alone"	Nili Hadida	Nili Hadida	Producer/Writer
2018	"401"	Nili Hadida	Nili Hadida	Producer/Writer
2018	"Dorian"	Nili Hadida	Nili Hadida	Producer/Writer
2018	"Another Drink"	Nili Hadida	Nili Hadida	Producer/Writer
2018	"Frank"	Nili Hadida	Nili Hadida	Producer/Writer
2018	"Gold Memories"	Nili Hadida	Nili Hadida	Producer/Writer
2018	"Brazilian War"	Nili Hadida	Nili Hadida	Producer/Writer
2018	"Covered In Luck"	Nili Hadida	Nili Hadida	Producer/Writer
2018	"A Lot Too Much"	Nili Hadida	Nili Hadida	Producer/Writer
2018	"Dripping Summers" (featuring Little Dragon and Vic Mensa)	Christian Rich	Dripping Summers	Artist & Producer
2018	"Ghost" (featuring Christian Rich)	Jaden	GHOST	Producer & Featured Artist
2018	"Best Friends" (Christian Rich Re-Work)	Little Dragon	Best Friends	Remixer
2018	"You Can Cry" (with Juicy J featuring James Arthur)	Marshmello	Non-album single	Co-Writer & Co-Producer
2017	"Fashion Week" (featuring G-Eazy)	Wale	Shine	Producer
2017	"The Passion"	Jaden	Syre	Writer & Producer
2017	"Big Fish"	Vince Staples	Big Fish Theory	Producer
2017	"Nothing Burns Like The Cold" (Featuring Vince Staples)	Snoh Aalegra	Feels	Producer & Co-Writer
2016	"In Your River"	Snoh Aalegra	Don't Explain	Producer & Co-Writer
2016	"One On One" (featuring Chris Brown)	Casey Veggies	Customized Greatly Vol. 4: The Return of The Boy	Producer
2016	"My Own" (featuring JMSN)	Domo Genesis	Genesis	Producer
2016	"Deep"	Lizzo	Coconut Oil (EP)	Producer & Co-Writer
2015	"Time Flies" (featuring Lil B)	Mac Miller	GO:OD AM	Producer
2015	"Señorita"	Vince Staples	Summertime '06	Producer
2015	"Lake Como"	Puro Instinct	Lake Como	Producer & Featured Artist
2014	"The Palisades"	Childish Gambino	Kauai	Producer & Featured Artist
2014	"Fire"	Jaden	CTV2	Producer
2013	"I.Crawl"	Childish Gambino	Because the Internet	Co-Producer
2013	"Pound Cake / Paris Morton Music 2" (featuring Jay Z)	Drake	Nothing Was the Same	Intro/Speech Sampler With Utters
2013	"Something Special"	Chris Brown	Non-album single	Producer
2013	"One On One (When I Love Ya)"	Chris Brown	Non-album single	Producer
2013	"Sparks Will Fly"	J. Cole	Born Sinner	Producer
2013	"Centurion"	Earl Sweatshirt	Doris	Producer
2013	"Knight"	Earl Sweatshirt	Doris	Producer
2013	"Molasses"	Earl Sweatshirt	Doris	Co-Producer
2012	"Chum"	Earl Sweatshirt	Doris	Co-Producer
2012	"Dance"	Rye Rye	Go! Bang! Pop!	Producer
2011	"Lovely" (featuring Pusha T)	John West	John West	Producer
2010	"Hot-n-Fun (Christian Rich Remix)" (featuring Nelly Furtado)	N.E.R.D	Hot-N-Fun The Remixes	Remixer
2010	"Hello Virgin"	Christian Rich	The Decadence Mixtape	Artist & Producer
2009	"Famous Girl"	Christian Rich	The Decadence Mixtape	Artist & Producer
2008	"Schemer"	Christian Rich	G-Star Raw Records Volume 1	Producer & Featured Artist
2003	"Get In Touch With Us" (featuring Styles P)	Lil' Kim	La Bella Mafia	Producer
2003	"I'm Serious"	Clipse	Cradle 2 the Grave Soundtrack	Producer
2003	"Jumpin'"	Foxy Brown	Ill Na Na 2: The Fever	Producer
