= Chance the Rapper discography =

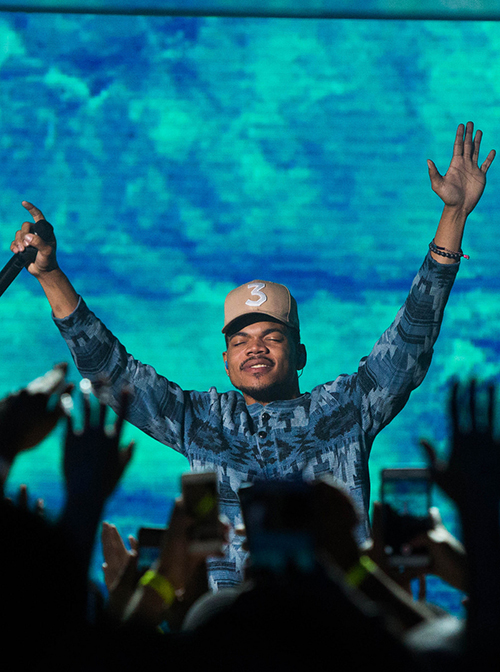
- Chance the Rapper performing in 2017
- Studio albums: 2
- Mixtapes: 5
- Singles: 50
- Music videos: 11
- Guest appearances: 58

The discography of American rapper Chance the Rapper consists of two studio albums, five mixtapes, and 50 singles (including 20 singles as a featured artist).

Chance the Rapper released his debut mixtape 10 Day on April 3, 2012. The mixtape was followed up with the release of Acid Rap the following year, which saw universal acclaim from music critics. Chance the Rapper then released his third mixtape, Coloring Book on May 13, 2016. The mixtape peaked at number eight on the Billboard 200 chart to continued acclaim and was supported by the singles "Angels" and "No Problem", the latter peaked at number 43 on the US Billboard Hot 100 chart. He announced and subsequently released his debut studio album, The Big Day in July 2019. Chance followed up with his second studio album, Star Line in 2025. It is regarded as a comeback album and return to form for Chance following negative reception of his debut album. The album achieved mild commercial success peaking at number 22 on the Billboard 200.

== Albums ==
=== Studio albums ===
List of studio albums, with selected details
Title	Details	Peak chart positions									
Title	Details	US	AUS	BEL	CAN	DEN	IRE	NLD	NOR	NZ	UK
The Big Day	Released: July 26, 2019; Label: Self-released; Format: CD, Vinyl, streaming, digital download	2	7	45	3	16	18	16	34	10	17
Star Line	Released: August 15, 2025; Label: Self-released; Formats: Digital download, streaming	22	—	—	—	—	—	—	—	—	—

=== Collaborative albums ===
List of studio albums, with selected details
Title	Details
Surf (with Donnie Trumpet and The Social Experiment)	Released: May 28, 2015; Label: Self-released; Format: digital download

== Mixtapes ==
List of mixtapes, with selected chart positions
Title	Album details	Peak chart positions							Certifications
Title	Album details	US	US R&B /HH	US Rap	CAN	NLD	NOR	SWE	Certifications
10 Day	Released: April 3, 2012; Label: Self-released; Formats: Digital download, vinyl	73	35	—	—	—	—	—	
Acid Rap	Released: April 30, 2013; Label: Self-released; Formats: Digital download, vinyl	5	3	2	18	—	—	—	
Coloring Book	Released: May 13, 2016; Label: Self-released; Formats: Digital download, vinyl	8	9	6	20	149	32	56	RIAA: Platinum
"—" denotes a recording that did not chart or was not released in that territory.

=== Collaborative mixtapes ===
List of mixtapes, with selected chart positions
Title	Album details	Peak chart positions						
Title	Album details	US	US R&B /HH	US Rap	CAN	NLD	NOR	SWE
Free (Based Freestyles Mixtape) (with Lil B)	Released: August 5, 2015; Label: Self-released; Formats: Digital download	—	—	—	—	—	—	—
Merry Christmas Lil' Mama (with Jeremih)	Released: December 22, 2016; Label: Self-released; Formats: Digital download	—	—	—	—	—	—	—
Secret Santa (with Jeremih)	Released: December 24, 2025; Label: Self-released; Formats: Digital download	—	—	—	—	—	—	—
"—" denotes a recording that did not chart or was not released in that territory.

== Singles ==
=== As lead artist ===
List of singles, showing year released, peak chart positions and album name
Title	Year	Peak chart positions										Certifications	Album
Title	Year	US	US R&B /HH	US Rap	AUS Hit.	AUS Urb.	CAN	IRE	NZ Hot	UK	UK Indie	Certifications	Album
"Juice"	2013	—	—	—	—	—	—	—	—	—	—		Acid Rap
"Acid Rain"	2013	—	—	—	—	—	—	—	—	—	—		Acid Rap
"Angels" (featuring Saba)	2015	— (Note: "Angels" did not enter the US Billboard Hot 100, but peaked at number 19 on the Bubbling Under Hot 100 Singles chart.)	— (Note: "Angels" did not enter the US Hot R&B/Hip-Hop Songs chart, but peaked at number four on the Bubbling Under R&B/Hip-Hop Singles chart.)	—	—	—	—	—	—	—	— (Note: "Angels" did not enter the UK Independent Chart, but peaked at number 13 on the UK Independent Singles Breakers Chart.)	RIAA: Platinum; RMNZ: Gold	Coloring Book
"Somewhere in Paradise" (featuring Jeremih and R. Kelly)	2015	—	—	—	—	—	—	—	—	—	—		Non-album single
"No Problem" (featuring Lil Wayne and 2 Chainz)	2016	43	14	10	—	—	94	—	—	—	—	RIAA: 4× Platinum; BPI: Silver; RMNZ: 2× Platinum	Coloring Book
"Summer Friends" (featuring Jeremih and Francis and the Lights)	2016	— (Note: "Summer Friends" did not enter the Billboard Hot 100, but peaked at number 18 on the Bubbling Under Hot 100 Singles chart.)	— (Note: "Summer Friends" did not enter the Hot R&B/Hip-Hop Songs chart, but peaked at number two on the Bubbling Under R&B/Hip-Hop Singles chart.)	—	—	—	—	—	—	—	—	RIAA: Platinum	Coloring Book
"I Might Need Security"	2018	60	25	22	5	35	80	51	5	94	17		Non-album singles
"Work Out"	2018	— (Note: "Work Out" did not enter the US Billboard Hot 100, but peaked at number 19 on the Bubbling Under Hot 100 Singles chart.)	— (Note: "Work Out" did not enter the Hot R&B/Hip-Hop Songs chart, but peaked at number four on the Bubbling Under R&B/Hip-Hop Singles chart.)	—	17	—	—	—	16	—	—		Non-album singles
"65th & Ingleside"	2018	— (Note: "65th & Ingleside" did not enter the US Billboard Hot 100, but peaked at number 17 on the Bubbling Under Hot 100 Singles chart.)	— (Note: "65th & Ingleside" did not enter the Hot R&B/Hip-Hop Songs chart, but peaked at number two on the Bubbling Under R&B/Hip-Hop Singles chart.)	—	—	—	—	—	18	—	—		Non-album singles
"Wala Cam" (featuring Supa Bwe)	2018	—	—	—	—	—	—	—	27	—	—		Non-album singles
"The Man Who Has Everything"	2018	—	—	—	—	—	—	—	—	—	—		Non-album singles
"My Own Thing" (featuring Joey Purp)	2018	—	—	—	—	—	—	—	40	—	—		Non-album singles
"Groceries" (featuring TisaKorean and Murda Beatz)	2019	— (Note: "Groceries" did not enter the US Billboard Hot 100, but peaked at number nine on the Bubbling Under Hot 100 chart.)	— (Note: "Groceries" did not enter the Hot R&B/Hip-Hop Songs chart, but peaked at number two on the Bubbling Under R&B/Hip-Hop Singles chart.)	— (Note: "Groceries" did not enter the Billboard Hot Rap Songs chart, but peaked at number 14 on the Rap Digital Songs Sales chart.)	—	—	—	—	27	—	—		Non-album singles
"Do You Remember" (featuring Death Cab for Cutie)	2019	95	42	—	—	—	—	—	18	—	—		The Big Day
"Hot Shower" (featuring MadeinTYO and DaBaby)	2019	58	24	21	6	—	69	—	11	—	—		The Big Day
"Found You" (with Ludacris)	2020	—	—	—	—	—	—	—	—	—	—		Non-album single
"Are U Live" (with Jeremih featuring Valee)	2020	—	—	—	—	—	—	—	—	—	—		Merry Christmas Lil' Mama
"The Return"	2020	—	—	—	—	—	—	—	—	—	—		Merry Christmas Lil' Mama
"The Heart & the Tongue"	2021	—	—	—	—	—	—	—	—	—	—		Non-album singles
"Child of God"	2022	—	—	—	—	—	—	—	—	—	—		Non-album singles
"Wraith" (featuring Vic Mensa and Smoko Ono)	2022	—	—	—	—	—	—	—	—	—	—		Non-album singles
"A Bar About a Bar"	2022	—	—	—	—	—	—	—	—	—	—		Non-album singles
"The Highs & the Lows" (featuring Joey Badass)	2022	—	—	—	—	—	—	—	21	—	—		Star Line
"I Will Be Your (Black Star Line Freestyle)"	2024	—	—	—	—	—	—	—	—	—	—		Non-album singles
"Buried Alive"	2024	—	—	—	—	—	—	—	—	—	—		Non-album singles
"Together" (with DJ Premier)	2024	—	—	—	—	—	—	—	25	—	—		Non-album singles
"Stars Out"	2024	—	—	—	—	—	—	—	—	—	—		Non-album singles
"Bad Boys 2" (featuring Joey Purp)	2024	—	—	—	—	—	—	—	—	—	—		Non-album singles
"3333"	2024	—	—	—	—	—	—	—	—	—	—		Non-album singles
"Tree" (with Lil Wayne and Smino)	2025	—	—	—	—	—	—	—	—	—	—		Star Line
"Barbie Doll" (with Hurricane Wisdom)	2026	— (Note: "Barbie Doll" did not enter the US Billboard Hot 100, but peaked at number 8 on the Bubbling Under Hot 100 chart.)	50	—	—	—	—	—	—	—	—		Non-album single
"—" denotes a recording that did not chart or was not released in that territory.

=== As featured artist ===
List of singles as featured artist, showing year released, peak chart positions, certifications and album name
Title	Year	Peak chart positions										Certifications	Album
Title	Year	US	US R&B /HH	US Rap	AUS	BEL (FL)	CAN	DEN	GER	NL	UK	Certifications	Album
"Three Course Meal" (Probcause featuring Action Bronson and Chance the Rapper)	2012	—	—	—	—	—	—	—	—	—	—		The Recipe Vol. 2
"Life Round Here" (James Blake featuring Chance the Rapper)	2013	—	—	—	—	—	—	—	—	—	—		Non-album single
"Confident" (Justin Bieber featuring Chance the Rapper)	2013	41	9	—	53	34	29	1	61	23	33	RIAA: Platinum; ARIA: Platinum; BPI: Gold; IPFI DEN: Gold; RMNZ: Platinum	Journals
"Baby Blue" (Action Bronson featuring Chance the Rapper)	2015	91	30	21	—	61	—	—	—	—	—	RIAA: Platinum; RMNZ: Platinum	Mr. Wonderful
"The Way" (Kehlani featuring Chance the Rapper)	2015	—	—	—	—	—	—	—	—	—	—	RIAA: Platinum; RMNZ: Gold	You Should Be Here
"Church" (BJ the Chicago Kid featuring Chance the Rapper)	2015	—	— (Note: "Church" did not enter the Billboard Hot R&B/Hip-Hop Songs, but peaked at number 44 on the R&B/Hip-Hop Airplay chart.)	—	—	—	—	—	—	—	—		In My Mind
"All My Friends" (Snakehips featuring Tinashe and Chance the Rapper)	2015	— (Note: "All My Friends" did not enter the Billboard Hot 100, but peaked at number three on the Bubbling Under Hot 100 Singles chart.)	34	—	3	25	82	34	67	29	5	RIAA: Platinum; ARIA: 3× Platinum; BPI: 2× Platinum; BVMI: Gold; MC: Platinum; RMNZ: 5× Platinum	All My Friends
"Show Me Love (Skrillex Remix)" (Hundred Waters featuring Chance the Rapper, Moses Sumney, and Robin Hannibal)	2016	—	—	—	—	—	—	—	—	—	—		Non-album single
"Penthouse Floor" (John Legend featuring Chance the Rapper)	2016	—	— (Note: "Penthouse Floor" did not enter the Billboard Hot R&B/Hip-Hop Songs, but peaked at number 21 on the Adult R&B Songs chart.)	—	—	—	—	—	—	—	—		Darkness and Light
"I'm the One" (DJ Khaled featuring Justin Bieber, Quavo, Chance the Rapper, and Lil Wayne)	2017	1	1	1	1	10	1	2	4	4	1	RIAA: Diamond (10× Platinum); ARIA: 8× Platinum; BEA: Platinum; BPI: 2× Platinum; BVMI: Platinum; IFPI DEN: Platinum; MC: 7× Platinum; RMNZ: 4× Platinum	Grateful
"No Brainer" (DJ Khaled featuring Justin Bieber, Chance the Rapper, and Quavo)	2018	5	4	—	6	24	4	1	15	17	3	RIAA: 3× Platinum; ARIA: 4× Platinum; BPI: Platinum; IFPI DEN: Platinum; MC: 3× Platinum; RMNZ: 2× Platinum	Father of Asahd
"What's the Hook" (Reeseynem featuring Chance the Rapper)	2018	—	—	—	—	—	—	—	—	—	—		Only on the Weekends
"Cross Me" (Ed Sheeran featuring Chance the Rapper and PnB Rock)	2019	25	—	—	5	78	16	9	23	57	4	RIAA: Gold; ARIA: 3× Platinum; BPI: Platinum; MC: 2× Platinum; RMNZ: 2× Platinum	No.6 Collaborations Project
"Bad Idea" (Cordae featuring Chance the Rapper)	2019	—	—	—	—	—	—	—	—	—	—		The Lost Boy
"Gucci Pajamas" (Guapdad 4000 featuring Chance the Rapper and Charlie Wilson)	2019	—	—	—	—	—	—	—	—	—	—		Dior Deposits
"Baby Mama" (Brandy featuring Chance the Rapper)	2020	—	—	—	—	—	—	—	—	—	—		B7
"Holy" (Justin Bieber featuring Chance the Rapper)	2020	3	—	—	4	30	1	7	22	5	10	RIAA: 3× Platinum; ARIA: 4× Platinum; BEA: Gold; BPI: Platinum; MC: 4× Platinum; IFPI DEN: Platinum; RMNZ: 3× Platinum	Justice
"BET Uncut" (MadeinTYO featuring Chance the Rapper and Smino)	2020	—	—	—	—	—	—	—	—	—	—		Never Forgotten
"Winners" (Smoko Ono featuring Yxng Bane, Chance the Rapper, and Joey Purp)	2021	—	—	—	—	—	—	—	—	—	—		TBA
"Swish" (Vic Mensa featuring Chance the Rapper and G-Eazy)	2023	—	—	—	—	—	—	—	—	—	—		Victor
"—" denotes a recording that did not chart or was not released in that territory.

=== Promotional singles ===
Title	Year	Album	Certifications
"Living Single" (Big Sean featuring Chance the Rapper and Jeremih)	2016	Non-album single	RIAA: Platinum; RMNZ: Gold

== Other charted and certified songs ==
Title	Year	Peak chart positions										Certifications	Album
Title	Year	US	US R&B /HH	US Rap	BEL Tip	CAN	IRE	NZ Hot	SWE Heat.	UK	UK Indie	Certifications	Album
"Favorite Song" (featuring Childish Gambino)	2013	—	— (Note: "Favorite Song" did not enter the Billboard Hot R&B/Hip-Hop Songs, but peaked at number 20 on the R&B/Hip-Hop Digital Songs Sales chart.)	— (Note: "Favorite Song" did not enter the Billboard Hot Rap Songs chart, but peaked at number 14 on the Rap Digital Songs Sales chart.)	—	—	—	—	—	—	—		Acid Rap
"Cocoa Butter Kisses" (featuring Vic Mensa and Twista)	2013	—	—	—	—	—	—	—	—	—	—	RMNZ: Gold	Acid Rap
"Childs Play" (SZA featuring Chance the Rapper)	2014	—	—	—	—	—	—	—	—	—	—	RIAA: Platinum; RMNZ: Gold	Z
"Ultralight Beam" (Kanye West featuring Chance the Rapper)	2016	67	22	—	—	88	78	—	5	63	—	BPI: Gold; RIAA: Platinum	The Life of Pablo
"All We Got" (featuring Kanye West and the Chicago Children's Choir)	2016	— (Note: "All We Got" did not enter the Billboard Hot 100, but peaked at number two on the Bubbling Under Hot 100 Singles chart.)	45	—	—	—	—	—	—	—	—	RIAA: Platinum; RMNZ: Gold	Coloring Book
"Blessings" (featuring Jamila Woods)	2016	93	40	— (Note: "Blessings" did not enter the Billboard Hot Rap Songs chart, but peaked at number 21 on the Rap Streaming Songs chart.)	—	—	—	—	—	—	40	RIAA: Platinum; RMNZ: Gold	Coloring Book
"Same Drugs"	2016	—	— (Note: "Same Drugs" did not enter the Hot R&B/Hip-Hop Songs chart, but peaked at number five on the Bubbling Under R&B/Hip-Hop Singles chart.)	—	—	—	—	—	—	—	—	RIAA: Platinum; RMNZ: Gold	Coloring Book
"Mixtape" (featuring Young Thug and Lil Yachty)	2016	— (Note: "Mixtape" did not enter the Billboard Hot 100, but peaked at number ten on the Bubbling Under Hot 100 Singles chart.)	49	—	—	—	—	—	—	—	—	RIAA: Gold	Coloring Book
"Juke Jam" (featuring Justin Bieber and Towkio)	2016	— (Note: "Juke Jam" did not enter the Billboard Hot 100, but peaked at number five on the Bubbling Under Hot 100 Singles chart.)	48	—	—	—	—	—	—	—	—	RIAA: 2× Platinum; RMNZ: Gold	Coloring Book
"All Night" (featuring Knox Fortune)	2016	— (Note: "All Night" did not enter the Billboard Hot 100, but peaked at number 23 on the Bubbling Under Hot 100 Singles chart.)	— (Note: "All Night" did not enter the Hot R&B/Hip-Hop Songs chart, but peaked at number one on the Bubbling Under R&B/Hip-Hop Singles chart.)	— (Note: "All Night" did not enter the Billboard Hot Rap Songs, but peaked at number 21 on the Rap Airplay chart.)	26	—	—	—	—	—	34	RIAA: Platinum; BPI: Gold; RMNZ: Platinum	Coloring Book
"How Great" (featuring Jay Electronica and My Cousin Nicole)	2016	—	— (Note: "How Great" did not enter the Hot R&B/Hip-Hop Songs chart, but peaked at number ten on the Bubbling Under R&B/Hip-Hop Singles chart.)	—	—	—	—	—	—	—	—	RIAA: Gold	Coloring Book
"Smoke Break" (featuring Future)	2016	— (Note: "Smoke Break" did not enter the Billboard Hot 100, but peaked at number 13 on the Bubbling Under Hot 100 chart.)	— (Note: "Smoke Break" did not enter the Hot R&B/Hip-Hop Songs chart, but peaked at number one on the Bubbling Under R&B/Hip-Hop Singles chart.)	—	—	—	—	—	—	—	—	RIAA: Platinum	Coloring Book
"Finish Line / Drown" (featuring T-Pain, Kirk Franklin, Eryn Allen Kane and Noname)	2016	—	— (Note: "Finish Line / Drown" did not enter the Hot R&B/Hip-Hop Songs chart, but peaked at number nine on the Bubbling Under R&B/Hip-Hop Singles chart.)	—	—	—	—	—	—	—	—	RIAA: Gold	Coloring Book
"Blessings (Reprise)" (featuring Anderson .Paak, BJ the Chicago Kid, Raury & Ty Dolla $ign)	2016	—	—	—	—	—	—	—	—	—	—	RIAA: Gold	Coloring Book
"Best Life" (Cardi B featuring Chance the Rapper)	2018	39	24	19	—	66	—	—	—	—	—	RIAA: Platinum	Invasion of Privacy
"All Day Long" (featuring John Legend)	2019	94	41	—	—	—	—	14	—	—	—		The Big Day
"Eternal" (featuring Smino)	2019	— (Note: "Eternal" did not enter the Billboard Hot 100, but peaked at number 25 on the Bubbling Under Hot 100 chart.)	— (Note: "Eternal" did not enter the Billboard Hot R&B/Hip-Hop Songs, but peaked at number 9 on the Bubbling Under R&B/Hip-Hop Songs chart.)	—	—	—	—	20	—	—	—		The Big Day
"Handsome" (featuring Megan Thee Stallion)	2019	— (Note: "Handsome" did not enter the Billboard Hot 100, but peaked at number five on the Bubbling Under Hot 100 chart.)	45	—	—	—	—	—	—	—	—		The Big Day
"We Go High"	2019	—	— (Note: "We Go High" did not enter the Billboard Hot R&B/Hip-Hop Songs, but peaked at number 10 on the Bubbling Under R&B/Hip-Hop Songs chart.)	—	—	—	—	—	—	—	—		The Big Day
"Ballin Flossin" (featuring Shawn Mendes)	2019	— (Note: "Ballin Flossin" did not enter the Billboard Hot 100, but peaked at number 23 on the Bubbling Under Hot 100 chart.)	— (Note: "Ballin Flossin" did not enter the Billboard Hot R&B/Hip-Hop Songs, but peaked at number 8 on the Bubbling Under R&B/Hip-Hop Songs chart.)	— (Note: "Ballin Flossin" did not enter the Billboard Hot Rap Songs chart, but peaked at number 19 on the Rap Digital Songs Sales chart.)	—	96	—	—	—	—	—		The Big Day
"Slide Around" (featuring Lil Durk and Nicki Minaj)	2019	— (Note: "Slide Around" did not enter the Billboard Hot 100, but peaked at number 17 on the Bubbling Under Hot 100 chart.)	— (Note: "Slide Around" did not enter the Billboard Hot R&B/Hip-Hop Songs, but peaked at number 4 on the Bubbling Under R&B/Hip-Hop Songs chart.)	— (Note: "Slide Around" did not enter the Billboard Hot Rap Songs chart, but peaked at number 24 on the Rap Digital Songs Sales chart.)	—	—	—	—	—	—	—		The Big Day
"PTSD" (G Herbo featuring Chance the Rapper, Juice Wrld and Lil Uzi Vert)	2020	38	19	15	—	69	—	22	—	—	—	RIAA: Platinum; RMNZ: Gold	PTSD
"—" denotes a recording that did not chart or was not released in that territory.

== Guest appearances ==
Title	Year	Other performer(s)	Album
"National Geographical"	2011	Vic Spencer	Vic Greenthumbs
"Give and Take"	2011	Kembe X	Self Rule
"Lift Up"	2012	Milo & Otis	The Joy
"The Wonder Years"	2012	The O’My's, Nico Segal	Chicago Style
"They Don't Like Me"	2012	Childish Gambino	Royalty
"Bombay State of Mind"	2012	Odd Couple, Uno Hype, Hassani Kwess, Freeway	Separated at Birth
"Bout a Dollar"	2012	The Oh My's, Chuck Inglish, Twista & Chip tha Ripper	Blended Babies
"Home"	2012	Kami de Chukwu, Caleb James, Vic Mensa, Michael Anthony	LIGHT
"Wasting Time"	2012	Kids These Days	Traphouse Rock
"We Are"	2012	Gaines	Night Crawler: Reloaded
"Livin' in Vein"	2012	Lorine Chia	Lorine
"Ecstacy (Remix)"	2013	Tinashe	—N/a
"Long Night"	2013	Hoodie Allen	Crew Cuts
"Semi Detached"	2013	BenZel, Cass Lowe	—N/a
"Spaceship II"	2013	Alex Wiley, GLC	Club Wiley
"Wendy n Becky"	2013	Joey Badass	—N/a
"She's the Type"	2013	Brian Fresco, Towkio, Kami, MC Tree	Mafioso
"Steamer"	2013	Brian Fresco, Towkio, Kami, Vic Mensa	Mafioso
"Greenlight"	2013	Brian Fresco	Mafioso
"LSD"	2013	ProbCause	The Recipe Vol. 2
"Lonely Thoughts"	2013	Rapsody	She Got Game
"You Song"	2013	Lil Wayne	Dedication 5
"Tweakin'"	2013	Vic Mensa	Innanetape
"Untitled"	2013	Mr. Muthafuckin' eXquire	Kismet: Blue Edition
"The Worst Guys"	2013	Childish Gambino	Because the Internet
"Coast Is Clear"	2014	Skrillex	Recess
"Glam"	2014	Chuck Inglish	Convertibles
"Don't Wait (Remix)"	2014	Mapei	—N/a
"Fight for You"	2014	Pia Mia	Divergent: Original Motion Picture Soundtrack
"Childs Play"	2014	SZA	Z
"Tap Dance"	2014	Octave Minds	Octave Minds
"Fight or Flight" (Remix)	2014	Lil Herb, Common	Ballin Like I'm Kobe
"Raw Wraps"	2014	A Villa	Carry on Tradition
"Friendship Heights"	2014	Wale	Festivus
"Iconic"	2015	Madonna, Mike Tyson	Rebel Heart
"I Told You So"	2015	Leather Corduroys	Season
"Navigator Truck"	2015	Alex Wiley	Village Party 2
"Cold Stares"	2015	Nosaj Thing, The O'My's	Fated
"Clean Up"	2015	Towkio	.Wav Theory
"Heaven Only Knows"	2015	Towkio, Lido, Eryn Allen Kane	.Wav Theory
"Prisoner"	2015	Jordan Bratton	Youth
"Remember Me?"	2015	Kyle	Smyle
"Broad Shoulders"	2015	Taylor Bennett	Broad Shoulders
"Hello"	2015	Busta Rhymes	The Return of the Dragon (The Abstract Went on Vacation)
"Stevie Wonder"	2015	Lucki	X
"Ultralight Beam"	2016	Kanye West, Kirk Franklin, Kelly Price, The-Dream	The Life of Pablo
"Need to Know"	2016	Macklemore & Ryan Lewis	This Unruly Mess I've Made
"Girls @"	2016	Joey Purp	iiiDrops
"Higher"	2016	Brian Fresco, Blue Hawaii	—N/a
"Pass Dat (Remix)"	2016	Jeremih, The Weeknd, Young Thug	—N/a
"Grown Ass Kid"	2016	Mick Jenkins, Alex Wiley	—N/a
"Dear Theodosia (Reprise)"	2016	Francis and the Lights	The Hamilton Mixtape
"LSD"	2016	Jamila Woods	HEAVN
"May I Have This Dance (Remix)"	2017	Francis and the Lights	—N/a
"Grown Up Fairy Tales"	2017	Taylor Bennett, Jeremih	Restoration of an American Idol
"I Love You So Much"	2017	DJ Khaled	Grateful
"Best Life"	2018	Cardi B	Invasion of Privacy
"Wake Up"	2018	Tee Grizzley	Still My Moment
"Reboot"	2018	Kami, Smoko Ono, Joey Purp	Very Slight
"Everything (Remix)"	2018	G Herbo, Lil Uzi Vert	Humble Beast
"Logout"	2018	Saba	Care for Me
"I'm Not Crazy, Life Is"	2019	2 Chainz, Kodak Black	Rap or Go to the League
"Rememory"	2019	Supa Bwe	Just Say Thank You
"No One Outside"	2019	Taylor Bennett, Bianca Shaw	The American Reject
"Gospel"	2019	DaBaby, Gucci Mane, YK Osiris	Kirk
"Forever Always"	2019	Peter Cottontale	Catch
"Pray for Real"	2019	Peter Cottontale	Catch
"I Love You"	2019	Trippie Redd	A Love Letter to You 4
"First Day Out"	2019	Reeseynem, Jeremih	Only on the Weekends
"Put It on Me"	2019	Reeseynem, Ayo & Teo	Only on the Weekends
"PTSD"	2020	G Herbo, Juice Wrld, Lil Uzi Vert	PTSD
"Judas"	2020	Spillage Village, JID, Ari Lennox, Buddy, Masego	Spilligion
"Together"	2020	Peter CottonTale, Chicago Children's Orchestra	—N/a
"Nothing's Impossible"	2021	Dionne Warwick	Non-album single
"See Me Fly"	2021	John Legend, Samba	Space Jam: A New Legacy (soundtrack)
"Through the Fire"	2021	Grace Weber	A Beautiful Space
"ACAB"	2022	Supa Bwe, 7000, redveil	No THANKS
"Run to You"	2022	King Promise, Vic Mensa	5 Star
"Low Sodium"	2022	The Cool Kids	Before Shit Got Weird
"We Need Angels"	2024	Tobe Nwigwe, PJ Morton, Sage Nwigwe	Hood Hymns
"Thank You"	2025	Trae the Truth, Yolanda Adams	Angels
"I'm On 4.0"	2025	Trae tha Truth, DMX, Busta Rhymes, Joyner Lucas, Jay Rock, Jeezy, Method Man. Ty $	—N/a
"Senzu Bean"	2025	D.R.A.M., Ellis Quinn	LEORPIO
"Goodbye (Remix)"	2025	Subtweet Shawn, Juvenile, Lodoni	—N/a

== Music videos (as feature) ==
Song	Year	Artist(s)
Life Round Here	2013	James Blake
Confident	2013	Justin Bieber
Zion	2013	Donnie Trumpet, Vic Mensa
The Worst Guys	2014	Childish Gambino
Baby Blue	2015	Action Bronson
The Way	2015	Kehlani
Clean Up	2015	Towkio
Church	2015	BJ the Chicago Kid, Buddy
Spaceship II	2015	Alex Wiley
All My Friends	2015	Snakehips, Tinashe
Cold Stares	2015	Nosaj Thing
Show Me Love (Skrillex Remix)	2016	Hundred Waters, Moses Sumney, Robin Hannibal
Girls @	2016	Joey Purp
Fight or Flight (Remix)	2016	G Herbo, Common
I'm the One	2017	DJ Khaled, Lil Wayne
May I Have This Dance	2017	Francis and the Lights
Penthouse Floor	2017	John Legend
LSD	2017	Jamila Woods
No Brainer	2018	DJ Khaled, Quavo, Justin Bieber
Everything (Remix)	2018	G Herbo, Lil Uzi Vert
What's the Hook?	2018	Reeseynem
Feels Like Summer	2018	Childish Gambino
Gucci Pajamas	2019	Guapdad 4000, Charlie Wilson
Rememory	2019	Supabwe
Baby Mama	2020	Brandy
Holy	2020	Justin Bieber
BET Uncut	2020	MadeinTYO, Smino
Shelter	2021	Vic Mensa, Wyclef Jean
Winners	2021	Smoke Ono, Joey Purp
Through the Fire	2021	Grace Weber
Swish	2023	Vic Mensa, G-Eazy

== Production discography ==
List of songwriting and production credits (excluding guest appearances, interpolations, and samples)
Track(s)	Year	Credit	Artist(s)	Album
2. "Father Stretch My Hands"	2016	Songwriter	Kanye West	The Life of Pablo
4. "Famous"	2016	Songwriter	Kanye West	The Life of Pablo
5. "Feedback"	2016	Songwriter	Kanye West	The Life of Pablo
10. "Waves"	2016	Songwriter	Kanye West	The Life of Pablo
30. "True Kinda Love"	2019	Producer (with Aivi & Surasshu and James Fauntleroy)	Zach Callison, Estelle	Steven Universe the Movie (Original Soundtrack)
