= Coloring Book (mixtape) =

Mixtape by Chance the Rapper
- Released: May 13, 2016
- Studio: CRC (Chicago) (Note: Except Kanye West's vocals on "All We Got", recorded at Conway (Los Angeles, California); and "D.R.A.M. Sings Special", recorded at Shangri-La (Malibu, California) and The Himalayas (Los Angeles, California))
- Genre: Gospel rap
- Length: 57:14
- Producer: Brasstracks; Cam O'bi; Carter Lang; Chris Barnett; DRAM; Francis and the Lights; Garren Sean; Greg Landfair Jr.; J.P. Floyd; Jordan Ware; Kanye West; Kaytranada; Kirk Franklin; Lido; Nate Fox; Nico Segal; Peter CottonTale; Rascal

Chance the Rapper chronology
Free (Based Freestyles Mixtape) (2015)	Coloring Book (2016)	Merry Christmas Lil' Mama (2016)

Singles from Coloring Book
- 1. "Angels" Released: October 27, 2015; 2. "No Problem" Released: May 26, 2016; 3. "Summer Friends" Released: August 17, 2016

Coloring Book is the third mixtape by American rapper Chance the Rapper. It was produced by his group The Social Experiment, Lido, and Kaytranada, among others. For the mixtape, Chance also collaborated with musicians such as Kanye West, Young Thug, Francis and the Lights, Justin Bieber, 2 Chainz, Kirk Franklin, and the Chicago Children's Choir.

Coloring Book was released on May 13, 2016, exclusively on Apple Music, before being made available to other streaming services on May 27. It was the first mixtape to chart on the US Billboard 200 solely on streams, peaking at number eight, while receiving widespread acclaim from critics who praised its fusion of hip hop and gospel sounds. The mixtape won Best Rap Album at the 2017 Grammy Awards. It was also the first streaming-only album ever to win a Grammy.

== Writing and recording ==
After releasing the well-received mixtape Acid Rap in 2013, Chance the Rapper went on tour with Macklemore & Ryan Lewis. He subsequently relocated to Los Angeles from his hometown of Chicago that December. He rented a North Hollywood mansion, which he dubbed the Koi Kastle. While he worked on music in fits and starts, he mainly spent time socializing with friends he made—among them Frank Ocean and J. Cole. He also abused drugs, mainly Xanax: "I was Xanned out every fucking day," he told GQ in 2016. He also went through numerous relationships, and he began to feel unproductive and empty.

He returned to Chicago and got back together with an old girlfriend. He grew more religious upon learning she was pregnant, and especially so after learning his daughter had an atrial flutter. "I think it was the baby that, you know, brought my faith back," he remarked later. On the subject of her heart condition, he said, "[It] made me pray a whole lot, you know, and need a lot of angels and just see shit in a very, like, direct way." His daughter was born in September 2015. During this time, he began to mull over themes he wished to include in his next mixtape, including "God, love, Chicago, [and] dance." Before working on that, he contributed heavily to Kanye West's album The Life of Pablo. Coloring Book was mainly recorded between March and April 2016. He rented out a room at a Chicago studio, and then another as he needed more space. He gradually came to more or less live at the studio during recording: "Eventually we decided to rent out the whole studio, and we just put mattresses in all the rooms and it became a camp." His method of making the mixtape was inspired by West taking over an entire studio to make Pablo.

== Music and lyrics ==
Chance the Rapper told Complex that Coloring Book would be a superior record to Surf, the 2015 album that he had released with his group Donnie Trumpet & The Social Experiment. As with his other mixtapes, 10 Day and Acid Rap, the cover artwork was painted by Chicago-based artist Brandon Breaux, who depicted Chance holding his baby daughter (below the frame) in order to capture the expression on his face.

According to Financial Times music critic Ludovic Hunter-Tilney, Coloring Book is an upbeat gospel rap album whose themes of spiritual fulfillment and worldly accomplishment are explored in music "that places gospel choirs and jazzy horns in a modern setting of Auto-Tuned hooks and crisp beats". Rolling Stone's Christopher R. Weingarten wrote that the gospel choirs were the foundation of the mixtape's music, functioning in the same way disco interpolations had on the earliest rap records, James Brown rhythms had for Public Enemy, and soul samples had for Kanye West.

Chance discussed Coloring Book's theme of Christian faith in an interview with Zane Lowe. "I never really set out to make anything that could pretend to be new gospel or pretend to be the gospel", he said. "It's just music from me as a Christian man because I think before I was making music as a Christian child. And in both cases I have imperfections, but there was a declaration that can be made through going all the [stuff] I've been through the last few years." Lowe himself believed the mixtape showcased how "faith in music and faith in God go hand-in-hand a lot of times".

== Marketing and sales ==
Coloring Book's release date was revealed by Tonight Show host Jimmy Fallon after Chance's May 6 performance of "Blessings" on the show. The mixtape was released exclusively to the Apple Music streaming service at 11 p.m. EST on May 12, the same day its second single "No Problem" was released; the lead single "Angels" had been released on October 27, 2015, while its finale single "Summer Friends" was released on August 17, 2016. Coloring Book was leaked to DatPiff, a mixtape distribution website, one hour after its release; it was removed from the site the following day.

In the first week of release, Coloring Book debuted at number eight on the US Billboard 200 based on 57.3 million streams of its songs, which Billboard equated to 38,000 album units. It was the first release to chart on the Billboard 200 solely on streams. The mixtape was available only on Apple Music through May 27, when it was released to other streaming services. Coloring Book became the first to surpass 500,000 with only streaming album equivalents. Since its debut in May 2016, the album stayed on the Billboard 200 chart for 33 consecutive weeks, peaking at number eight.

Chance the Rapper is scheduled to embark on a North American tour in support of the album's 10th anniversary from August to October 2026.

== Critical reception ==
Coloring Book ratings
Aggregate scores
Source	Rating
AnyDecentMusic?	8.2/10
Metacritic	89/100
Review scores
Source	Rating
AllMusic	5/5 stars
The A.V. Club	A−
Chicago Tribune	3.5/4 stars
Entertainment Weekly	A−
The Irish Times	4/5 stars
NME	4/5
Pitchfork	9.1/10
Rolling Stone	4/5 stars
Spin	9/10
Vice (Expert Witness)	A

Coloring Book was met with widespread critical acclaim. At Metacritic, which assigns a normalized rating out of 100 to reviews from mainstream publications, the mixtape received an average score of 89, based on 21 reviews. Aggregator AnyDecentMusic? gave it 8.2 out of 10, based on their assessment of the critical consensus.

Reviewing for the Chicago Tribune in May 2016, Greg Kot hailed the album as "a celebration of singing, harmonizing, human voices making a joyous noise together", while Kris Ex from Pitchfork named it "one of the strongest rap albums released this year, an uplifting mix of spiritual and grounded that even an atheist can catch the Spirit to". Writing for Vice, Robert Christgau believed Chance's already irrepressibly cheerful voice sounded more attractive and substantial than before because of how the music's gospel elements had encouraged a stronger "vocal muscle" and controlled pitch. Jon Caramanica of The New York Times argued that Chance had drawn on the spirituality and consciousness present in West's music while "blossoming into a crusader and a pop savant, coming as close as anyone has to eradicating the walls between the sacred and the secular". He found his flow melodically and rhythmically dense yet deft and effortless, while deeming his narratives both intimate and universal, touching on familial duties, the violent crime in Chance's native Chicago, and being an independent artist in the modern music industry era. In the opinion of Slate journalist Jack Hamilton, Coloring Book was "the first true gospel-rap masterpiece".

=== Accolades ===
At the end of 2016, Coloring Book appeared on a number of critics' lists ranking the year's top albums. According to Metacritic, it was the seventh most prominently ranked record of 2016. Christgau ranked it as the ninth best album of the year in his ballot for The Village Voice's annual Pazz & Jop critics poll. The album won Best Rap Album at the 2017 Grammy Awards. It was the first streaming-only album to win a Grammy. Rolling Stone ranked the album 105th out of the 200 greatest hip-hop albums of all time in 2022.

Select year-end rankings of Coloring Book
Publication	List	Rank	Ref.
American Songwriter	American Songwriter's Top 50 Albums of 2016	12	
Chicago Tribune	Greg Kot's Top Albums of 2016	8	
Complex	The 50 Best Albums of 2016	2	
The Independent	Best Albums of 2016	11	
The Irish Times	What Were the Best Albums of 2016?	9	
Mojo	The 50 Best Albums of 2016	40	
NME	NME's Albums of the Year 2016	9	
Pitchfork	The 50 Best Albums of 2016	6	
Rolling Stone	50 Best Albums of 2016	3	
Stereogum	The 50 Best Albums of 2016	3	

Awards and nominations for Coloring Book
Year	Ceremony	Category	Result	Ref.
2016	BET Hip Hop Awards	Best Mixtape	Won	
2017	BET Awards	Album of the Year	Nominated	
2017	Grammy Awards	Best Rap Album	Won	
2017	NAACP Image Awards	Outstanding Album	Nominated	

== Track listing ==
Credits are adapted from the album's vinyl liner notes.

Coloring Book track listing
No.	Title	Writer(s)	Producer(s)	Length
1.	"All We Got" (featuring Kanye West and Chicago Children's Choir)	Chancelor J. Bennett; Kanye West; Grace Weber; Nate Fox; Nico Segal; Peter Wilkins; Francis Farewell Starlite; Vasil Garnanliever; Teddy Jackson; Sima Cunningham; Josephine Lee; Jack Red; Isaiah Robinson	Chance the Rapper; West; Fox; Segal; Peter CottonTale; Francis and the Lights	3:23
2.	"No Problem" (featuring Lil Wayne and 2 Chainz)	Bennett; Ivan Rosenburg; Conor Szymanski; Dwayne Carter Jr.; Tauheed Epps; Wilkins; Cameron Osteen; Jaime Woods; Jonathan Hoard; Lakeitsha Williams; Rachel Cato	Chance the Rapper; Brasstracks; Cam O'bi; CottonTale	5:05
3.	"Summer Friends" (featuring Jeremih and Francis and the Lights)	Bennett; Aaron Lammer^{[a]}; Rostam Batmanglij^{[a]}; Starlite^{[a]}; Justin Vernon^{[a]}; Brandon Burton^{[a]}	Chance the Rapper; Francis and the Lights	4:50
4.	"D.R.A.M. Sings Special"	Bennett; Shelley Massenburg-Smith; Karl Rubin; Jordan Ware; Fox; Segal	Chance the Rapper; DRAM; Fox; Segal; Ware	1:41
5.	"Blessings" (featuring Jamila Woods)	Bennett; Wilkins; Segal; Fox; Fred Hammond; Byron Cage	Chance the Rapper; CottonTale; Segal; Fox; J.P. Floyd	3:41
6.	"Same Drugs"	Bennett; Peder Losnegård; Fox; Wilkins; Segal; Starlite	Chance the Rapper; Lido; Francis and the Lights; CottonTale; Segal	4:17
7.	"Mixtape" (featuring Young Thug and Lil Yachty)	Bennett; Chris Barnett; Jeffery Williams; Miles McCollum; Greg Landfair Jr.	Chance the Rapper; Landfair; Barnett	4:52
8.	"Angels" (featuring Saba)	Bennett; Losnegård; Fox; Wilkins; Segal; Tahj Chandler	Chance the Rapper; CottonTale; Fox; Segal; Lido	3:26
9.	"Juke Jam" (featuring Justin Bieber and Towkio)	Bennett; Justin Bieber; Preston Oshita; Tobias Breuer; Kai Campos^{[b]}; Dominic Maker^{[b]}	Chance the Rapper; Rascal; CottonTale	3:39
10.	"All Night" (featuring Knox Fortune)	Bennett; Kevin Rhomberg; Louis Kevin Celestin; Segal	Chance the Rapper; Kaytranada	2:21
11.	"How Great" (featuring Jay Electronica and my cousin Nicole)	Bennett; Timothy Tedford; Fox; Wilkins; Carter Lang; Jesse Reeves^{[c]}; Ed Cash^{[c]}; Chris Tomlin^{[c]}	Chance the Rapper; CottonTale; Fox; Lang	5:37
12.	"Smoke Break" (featuring Future)	Bennett; Garren Sean Langford; Nayvadius Wilburn	Chance the Rapper; Garren Sean	3:46
13.	"Finish Line / Drown" (featuring T-Pain, Kirk Franklin, Eryn Allen Kane and Noname)	Bennett; Landfair; Rajiv Halim; Wilkins; Segal; Fox; Kirk Franklin; Eryn Allen Kane; Faheem Rasheed Najm; Fatimah Nyeema Warner	Chance the Rapper; CottonTale; Segal; Fox; Landfair; Franklin	6:46
14.	"Blessings" (featuring Ty Dolla Sign, Raury, BJ the Chicago Kid and Anderson .Paak)	Bennett; Wilkins; Fox; Osteen; Segal; Hammond	Chance the Rapper; CottonTale; Fox; Segal; Cam O'bi	3:50
Total length:				57:14

Samples

- "All We Got" contains interpolations from "Good Ass Intro", written by Chancelor J. Bennett, Kanye West, Bryan J. Sledge, Lili K, Kiara Lanier, Peter CottonTale, Will Miller, J.P. Floyd, Cameron Osteen, Stefan Ponce, Lonnie Lynn and Dewayne Julius Rogers Sr.
- ^{^[a]} "Summer Friends" contains a sample from "Friends", written by Rostam Batmanglij, Justin Vernon, BJ Burton, Francis Farewell Starlite, Aaron Lammer, Ariel Rechtshaid, Benny Blanco and Cashmere Cat.
- ^{^[b]} "Juke Jam" contains samples of "Adriatic", performed by Mount Kimbie.
- "All Night" contains a sample of "Dealer's Corner", performed by Sven Torstenson.
- ^{^[c]} "How Great" contains an interpolation from "How Great Is Our God", written by Jesse Reeves, Ed Cash and Chris Tomlin.
- "Blessings" (reprise) contains a sample from "Let the Praise Begin (Chapter II)", performed by Fred Hammond.

== Personnel ==
Vocalists

- Chance the Rapper – lead vocals (1–3, 5–14), background vocals (1–3, 5–10, 12–14), vocals (4)
- Kanye West – featured vocals (1)
- Chicago Children's Choir – featured vocals (1), background vocals (6, 11, 13)
- Lil Wayne – featured vocals (2)
- 2 Chainz – featured vocals (2)
- Jeremih – featured vocals (3)
- Francis and the Lights – featured vocals (3)
- DRAM – featured vocals (4), background vocals (4)
- Jamila Woods – featured vocals (5), background vocals (5)
- Young Thug – featured vocals (7)
- Lil Yachty – featured vocals (7)
- Saba – featured vocals (8)
- Justin Bieber – featured vocals (9)
- Towkio – featured vocals (9)
- Knox Fortune – featured vocals (10)
- Jay Electronica – featured vocals (11)
- My cousin Nicole – featured vocals (11)
- Future – featured vocals (12)
- T-Pain – featured vocals (13)
- Kirk Franklin – featured vocals (13), background vocals (13)
- Noname – featured vocals (13)
- Eryn Allen Kane – featured vocals (13), vocals (6)
- Ty Dolla Sign – featured vocals (14)
- Raury – featured vocals (14)
- BJ the Chicago Kid – featured vocals (14)
- Anderson .Paak – featured vocals (14)
- Grace Weber – vocals (1)
- Fred Hammond – vocals (5)
- Sima Cunningham – background vocals (1, 6, 11, 13)
- Vasil Garnanliever – background vocals (1, 6, 11, 13)
- Teddy Jackson – background vocals (1, 6)
- Josephine Lee – background vocals (1, 3, 6, 11, 13)
- Jack Red – background vocals (1, 13)
- Isaiah Robinson – background vocals (1, 6, 11, 13)
- Jaime Woods – background vocals (2)
- Lakeitsha Williams – background vocals (2)
- Rachel Cato – background vocals (2)
- Jordan Ware – background vocals (4)
- Elle Varner – background vocals (4)
- Karl Rubin – background vocals (4)
- Macie Stewart – background vocals (6, 13)
- Nicole Steen – background vocals (11)
- Kirk Franklin's choir – background vocals (13)

Instrumentalists

- Nico Segal – trumpet (1, 13)
- J.P. Floyd – horns (5)
- Rajiv Halim – saxophones (13)
- Greg Landfair Sr. – guitar (6)

Additional side artists

- Ha Ha Davis (2, 14)
- James Francies (2)
- Ashwin Torke (2)
- Zarif Wilder (2)
- Mitchell Owens (3)
- Eric Pidluski (6)
- Brian Beach (6)
- Bridget Andes (6)
- Scott Dickinson (6)
- Meena Cho (6)
- Ashley Simpson (14)
- Benjamin Shepherd (14)
- Joseph Lopez (14)

Technical

- Nate Fox – recording (Grace Weber's vocals on 1), mixing (4)
- Squirrel – engineering (4)
- Rian – engineering (4)
- Jeff Lane – mixing (1–3, 5–11, 14)
- Elton "L10MixedIt" Cheung – mixing (12, 13)
- Peter CottonTale – mixing (13)
- Dave Kutch – mastering

Artwork

- O.J. Hays – design
- Brandon Breaux – cover artwork

== Charts ==
=== Weekly charts ===
Chart performance for Coloring Book
Chart (2016–2017)	Peak position
Canadian Albums (Billboard)	20
Irish Albums (IRMA)	81
Norwegian Albums (VG-lista)	32
Swedish Albums (Sverigetopplistan)	56
US Billboard 200	8
US Top R&B/Hip-Hop Albums (Billboard)	9

=== Year-end charts ===
2016 year-end chart performance for Coloring Book
Chart (2016)	Position
US Billboard 200	72

2017 year-end chart performance for Coloring Book
Chart (2017)	Position
US Billboard 200	33
US Top R&B/Hip-Hop Albums (Billboard)	21

2018 year-end chart performance for Coloring Book
Chart (2018)	Position
US Billboard 200	132

== Certifications ==
Certifications for Coloring Book
Region	Certification	Certified units/sales
Denmark (IFPI Danmark)	Gold	10,000^{‡}
United States (RIAA)	Platinum	1,000,000^{‡}
^{‡} Sales+streaming figures based on certification alone.
