= Favorite Song (Chance the Rapper song) =

Song by Chance the Rapper featuring Childish Gambino

Song by Chance the Rapper featuring Childish Gambino

from the album Acid Rap
- Released: April 30, 2013
- Length: 3:05
- Songwriters: Chancelor Bennett; Nate Fox; Donald Glover; Willie Clarke; Clarence Reid
- Producers: Chance the Rapper; Fox

"Favorite Song" is a song by American rapper Chance the Rapper from his second mixtape Acid Rap (2013). It features American rapper Childish Gambino and was produced by Chance himself and fellow Social Experiment member Nate Fox. The song samples Betty Wright's "Clean Up Woman", so the song's writers, Willie Clarke and Clarence Reid, are credited as writers alongside Chance and Fox. The song was not the only collaboration from the two artists, as they previously collaborated on the track "They Don't Like Me" from Gambino's sixth mixtape Royalty (2012).

Although the song was not released as a single, it would hit number 20 on the R&B/Hip-Hop Digital Song Sales chart, and would ultimately peak at number 14 on the Rap Digital Song Sales chart, becoming the only non-single song from the album to chart and Gambino's first non-single song as a feature to chart. The duo would later collaborate again on "The Worst Guys" from Gambino's second studio album, Because the Internet, that same year, another non-single song to chart, and the duo's most recent collaboration.

== Composition and lyrics ==
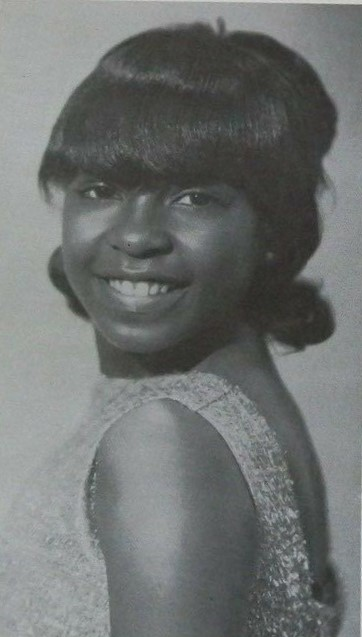
Betty Wright (pictured in 1968), whose song "Clean Up Woman" was sampled.

The song contains a sample of "Clean Up Woman" by Betty Wright, described as "tropical guitar samples". Due to the sample, the song's writers, Willie Clarke and Clarence Reid (also known as Blowfly) are credited as writers. Fred Thomas of AllMusic described the instrumental as "happily melodic".

The second verse of the song uses a staccato rhythm and internal rhyme scheme that is also used in the song "I Am the Very Model of a Modern Major-General" from Gilbert and Sullivan's 1879 opera The Pirates of Penzance and the poem Song of Eärendil from The Lord of the Rings series. This was noted by Stephen Colbert in a video of Rolling Stone's "Song Breakdown" series.

== Release and reception ==
The song was released on Chance's second mixtape, Acid Rap, on the 30th of April, 2013. In a review of Acid Rap, Maya Kalev of Fact praised the humor in the song, also describing Chance the Rapper as "good to a fault, putting his guests to shame" and that "Childish Gambino brings exactly nothing to the table". As for commercial reception, the song hit number 20 on the Billboard R&B/Hip-Hop Digital Song Sales chart and number 14 on the Rap Digital Song Sales chart in the United States of America.

== Charts ==
Chart (2019)	Peak position
US R&B/Hip-Hop Digital Song Sales	20
US Rap Digital Song Sales (Billboard)	14
