= All We Got (Chance the Rapper song) =

Song by Chance the Rapper featuring Kanye West and Chicago Children's Choir

from the album Coloring Book
- Released: May 13, 2016
- Genre: Hip hop; gospel rap
- Length: 3:23
- Label: Self-released
- Songwriters: Chancelor J. Bennett; Kanye West; Grace Weber; Nate Fox; Nico Segal; Peter Wilkins; Francis Farewell Starlite; Vasil Garnanliever; Teddy Jackson; Sima Cunningham; Josephine Lee; Jack Red; Isaiah Robinson
- Producers: Chance the Rapper; Kanye West; Nate Fox; Nico Segal; Peter CottonTale; Francis and the Lights

"All We Got" is a song by American rapper Chance the Rapper featuring Kanye West and Chicago Children's Choir, from Chance's third mixtape Coloring Book (2016). It contains vocals from Francis Starlite, Grace Weber, Isaiah Robinson, Jack Red, Sima Cunningham, Teddy Jackson and Vasil Garvanliev. A remix was shared by SBTRKT in March 2018.

== Background ==
Chance didn't originally plan for the song to be the kickoff track on the mixtape. SBTRKT shared a remix of it on March 22, 2018.

== Creation ==
"Music is all we got" is a West lyric and Chance revealed that "All We Got" was a perfect record because it wasn't the first one they made for the lyric. He also elaborated on how West added his touch to the song sonically.

== Commercial performance ==
The song debuted at number 2 on the US Billboard Bubbling Under Hot 100 and spend a total of two weeks on the chart. It debuted at number 45 on the US Hot R&B/Hip-Hop Songs chart in the same week as this.

== Charts ==
Chart (2016)	Peak position
US Bubbling Under Hot 100 (Billboard)	2
US Hot R&B/Hip-Hop Songs (Billboard)	45
US On-Demand Songs (Billboard)	36

== Certifications ==
Certifications for "All We Got"
Region	Certification	Certified units/sales
New Zealand (RMNZ)	Gold	15,000^{‡}
^{‡} Sales+streaming figures based on certification alone.
