= Juice (Chance the Rapper song) =

Single by Chance the Rapper

Single by Chance the Rapper

from the album Acid Rap
- Released: January 31, 2013
- Length: 3:35 (original); 0:30 (2019 streaming version)
- Songwriters: Chancelor Bennett; Nate Fox
- Producer: Nate Fox

Chance the Rapper singles chronology
"Ecstasy (Remix)" (2013)	"Juice" (2013)	"Acid Rain" (2013)

Music video
- "Juice" on YouTube

"Juice" is a song by American rapper Chance the Rapper, released on January 31, 2013 as the lead single from his second mixtape Acid Rap (2013). It was written by Chance and Nate Fox, who also produced the song. It was not only the first single from the project, but also the debut single from Chance as a lead artist, since no singles were released from his debut mixtape, 10 Day.

== Composition ==
"Juice" is a midtempo song, built around a loop of Donny Hathaway's live performance of "Jealous Guy" by John Lennon. Chance the Rapper sings and raps in a comedic manner; his verses in the song have been described as having a "freewheeling, bluesy sway" that "gives way to raucous call-and-response choruses". He references the 1992 film Juice (of which the song's title originates) and playfully taunts the Los Angeles Lakers while warning about the pitfalls of being successful.

== Critical reception ==
The song received generally favorable reviews from music critics. Craig Jenkins of Pitchfork wrote that it "finds Chance displaying better control of his abilities and treating the gear shift from rapping to singing less like the flick of a switch, as older songs did, and more like a pendulous drift." In addition, Jenkins commented that "'Juice' sounds off-the-cuff, but the delivery is a touch too technical for that to be the case". Similarly, Chris Martins of Spin praised Chance's "striking delivery", writing that "He rhymes, sings, and shouts with exuberance, unafraid to get a little goofy if it'll make the song better, all while making good on his claim". Writing for Earmilk, Aaron Thomas remarked that the song "may be one of his more accessible songs to date, with a fitting beat that doesn't distract from his strong lyrics and approach."

== Music video ==
The music video was directed by Austin Vesely. It sees Chance the Rapper bouncing around Times Square at night. Neon signs of advertisements and department stores appear in the background, some of which provide imagery and visual references of the lyrics. For example, when Chance lyrically alludes to the film Juice, a portrait of rapper Tupac Shakur (who starred in the film) flashes across a billboard.

== Streaming releases ==
When Acid Rap was first re-released on streaming services on June 28, 2019, "Juice" was replaced with a 30-second spoken message, in which Chance the Rapper explains the song is excluded from the mixtape because of an uncleared sample. Chance then adds that all streaming proceeds for the alternate version of "Juice" go directly to SocialWorks, a non-profit organization which he founded, and encourages listeners to replay the song all the way through for payment to be received. The full version was later released on the 10th anniversary Complete Edition.
