= Angels (Chance the Rapper song) =

Single by Chance the Rapper featuring Saba

from the album Coloring Book
- Released: October 27, 2015
- Recorded: 2015
- Genre: Hip hop; neo soul
- Length: 3:26
- Songwriters: Chancelor J. Bennett; Peder Losnegård; Nate Fox; Peter Wilkins; Nico Segal; Tahj Chandler
- Producers: Chance the Rapper; Peter CottonTale; Nate Fox; Nico Segal; Lido

Chance the Rapper singles chronology
"All My Friends" (2015)	"Angels" (2015)	"Somewhere in Paradise" (2015)

Saba singles chronology
"Angels" (2015)	"Monday to Monday" (2017)

Music video
- "Angels" on YouTube

"Angels" is a song by American hip hop recording artist Chance the Rapper. The song was released on October 27, 2015, as the lead single from his third solo mixtape, Coloring Book (2016). The track, produced by Lido and The Social Experiment, features vocals by fellow Chicago rapper Saba.

== Music video ==
The song's accompanying music video premiered on April 7, 2016, on Chance the Rapper's YouTube account. It was directed by Austin Vesely and Chance the Rapper. The video was nominated for Best Hip-Hop Video at the 2016 MTV Video Music Awards.

== Charts ==
Chart (2016)	Peak position
US Bubbling Under Hot 100 (Billboard)	19
US Bubbling Under R&B/Hip-Hop Singles (Billboard)	4

== Certifications ==
Certifications for "Angels"
Region	Certification	Certified units/sales
New Zealand (RMNZ)	Platinum	30,000^{‡}
^{‡} Sales+streaming figures based on certification alone.

== Release history ==
Region	Date	Format	Ref.
United States	October 27, 2015	Digital download	
