= Michael Golden =

Michael or Mike Golden may refer to:

- Michael Golden (comics), American comic book and graphic novel artist and writer
- Michael Golden (actor) (1913–1983), Irish-born English stage, film and television actor
- Michael Golden (businessman), American publisher
- Mike Golden (baseball) (1851–1929), baseball player
- Michael Golden (judge) (born 1942), Wyoming Supreme Court justice
- Mike Golden (ice hockey), American ice hockey forward
- Mike Golden, front man of the band Mike Golden and Friends
