= Speed of Love =

Speed of Love may refer to:

- "Speed of Love", a 2025 song by Chance the Rapper from Star Line
- "Speed of Love", a 2019 song by Florida Georgia Line from Can't Say I Ain't Country
- "Speed of Love", a 2012 song by Owl City from The Midsummer Station
- "Speed of Love", a 1981 song by Masayoshi Takanaka from Alone
