= Grace Weber =

American R&B singer, songwriter and producer

- Born: Grace Weber; June 28, 1988 (age 38); Wauwatosa, Wisconsin, U.S.
- Education: New York University
- Genres: Soul; hip hop; R&B; gospel
- Occupation: Singer-songwriter
- Instruments: Vocals, piano, guitar
- Years active: 2011–present
- Labels: Independent; Big Mouth Records; Capitol Records
- Website: graceweber.com

Grace Weber (born June 28, 1988) is an American R&B singer, songwriter and producer from Wauwatosa, Wisconsin. She is currently based in Los Angeles, California. Over her career, she has written for and collaborated with artists such as Chance the Rapper, Masego, Vic Mensa, Francis and the Lights, Westside Boogie and Towkio, as well as winning a Grammy Award. Weber has performed on national television shows including Showtime at the Apollo and The Oprah Winfrey Show.

After time spent at Capitol Records, Weber independently released her debut album, A Beautiful Space, on June 11, 2021, which was executive produced by The Social Experiment. The lead single, "Feels Like Heaven", was released on February 12, 2021, and the second single, "Thru the Fire", featuring rapper Chance the Rapper, was released on March 26, 2021. A deluxe version of the album was later released on October 27, 2021, followed by Weber's first ever headlining tour, "The Beautiful Space Tour".

== Early life ==
Grace Weber was born on June 28, 1988 in Wauwatosa, Wisconsin. The third of four children to Ralph Weber, a lawyer, and Patricia Mueller, a teacher, she grew up in a large and musical family. Her grandfather required each of his 10 children to learn an instrument, so she was exposed to music from a young age.

At 12, she joined the Central City Youth Gospel Choir in Milwaukee and began singing gospel in earnest at churches and revivals around the city, as the choir gave her "instant validation that [her] voice could move people."

In 2004, at age 16, she performed on the nationally televised Showtime at the Apollo in Harlem, New York. That same year, she was asked to perform at soccer icon Mia Hamm and baseball player Nomar Garciaparra's wedding in Santa Barbara, California.

In 2006, she was named a Presidential Scholar for the Arts, as part of the Presidential Scholars Program, performing at the Kennedy Center. She is a YoungArts alumnus.

Also in 2006, Weber attended New York University's Gallatin School of Individualized Study, and created a major in Music Performance and Music Marketing with a minor in Studio Art. Weber graduated from NYU in May 2010.

== Music career ==
=== Early career + initial projects: 2009–2015 ===
In 2009, in her senior year at NYU, Weber submitted a video of herself singing Aretha Franklin's "Natural Woman" to The Oprah Winfrey Show as part of its Karaoke Challenge. As one of the eight semi-finalists chosen from all entries, she performed live on the Oprah Show. Hosts included Billy Ray Cyrus, Gladys Knight, and Ashford and Simpson.

In 2010, Weber was named a Spotlight Artist to Watch in Billboard.

Before the release of her first project, Hope & Heart, in 2011, Weber was asked to perform at the official commemoration of the 10th anniversary of 9/11 in Paris, where she performed her original song, "Leave the Light On". Hope & Heart was released on September 13, 2011, produced by Michael Mangini. Throughout 2012, Weber received more press for her first project, including being an NBC "First Look" in February 2012 and Huffington Post's A-sides, with Jon Chattman performing "Hitchhiker".

In 2013, Weber began production on her second project, The Refinery. Notable singles from the project include the pop ballad "Till I Hurt You," which was the third single from the project and premiered on Conan O’Brian’s Team Coco. The Refinery and its songs received coverage from major outlets including USA Today, Lucky, Soundcheck, NPR Music, Access Hollywood, Good Day New York, Blackbook, Relix, Entertainment Weekly, Audio Tree, and Kick Kick Snare.

In 2014, Weber was featured as one of BuzzFeed's "11 Independent Musicians Who Are Making a Name for Themselves," described as "old soul with new boogie shoes." She also showcased at SXSW 2014, and was featured as one of Maxim's "Hot 10".

In 2015, Weber was named one of New Music Seminars' "Artists on the Verge" along with artists like Wild Adriatic, Twin Peaks and Perfect Pussy. This development was covered by Billboard. Also in 2015, Weber performed for the National Music Publishers Association's annual event in Washington, D.C., opening for Lady A.

=== Grammy win, Capitol Records signing, and A Beautiful Space: 2016-present ===
In 2016, Weber wrote "All We Got" (feat. Kanye West and Chicago Children's Choir) for Chance the Rapper's mixtape, Coloring Book, which won Best Rap Album at the 2017 Grammy Awards and earned Weber her first Grammy from The Recording Academy. During that time, she featured and wrote on Westside Boogie's song "Prideful" from his mixtape Thirst 48 Part II.

In 2017, she performed at the Hollywood Bowl in Los Angeles, CA, alongside Francis and the Lights and Chance the Rapper. That same year, she wrote on a remix of Francis and the Lights' "May I Have This Dance", featuring Chance.

Weber also released her critically acclaimed single "More Than Friends" in 2017, which received support from John Mayer and was deemed a "shining" single by UPROXX. Produced by Nate Fox and Nico Segal of The Social Experiment, "More Than Friends" further cemented their ongoing collaborative relationship (along with the group's Peter Cottontale) to craft Weber's debut album. Weber's single "Elated" soon followed, hailed by Billboard as a "euphoric delight."

Weber signed a major label deal with Capitol Records in 2018. She subsequently dropped a string of successful singles under the label including highlight "Mercy", featuring Vic Mensa. Weber was also featured on Towkio's song "2 Da Moon" alongside Teddy Jackson around this time. Later in 2018, she toured with Chance the Rapper as part of Lollapalooza, as well as with Thirdstory, and PJ Morton on his "More Gumbo" North American fall 2018 tour. In June 2018, she made her first appearance on NPR Music's Tiny Desk Concert alongside GoldLink.

In 2019, Weber embarked on a new journey as an independent artist, starting with the single "Young Love Games." In the summer of 2020, she released her debut EP How Did We Get Here, which featured standout tracks like "Crazy to Hope", featuring Masego. The EP was praised as "a master class in moving production, radiant vocals and engrossing lyrics" by the Milwaukee Journal Sentinel.

The lead single off her highly-anticipated debut album Feels Like Heaven "celebrates newfound artistic freedom," according to American Songwriter. The album's follow-up single "Thru the Fire" features Chance the Rapper and was released on March 26, 2021. COMPLEX called it "powerful," noting that it puts "her voice on full display." On June 11, 2021, she announced her debut album, A Beautiful Space, executive produced by The Social Experiment.

On 29 September 2023, Weber released her second album, Paperflower.

=== Grace Weber's Music Lab ===
Started by Weber in 2016, the Music Lab is a free monthly music and arts education program and talent accelerator for Milwaukee high school students hosted by musician and DJ B-Free. At the Music Lab, students learn about the music and entertainment industries through featured guests. They collaborate, perform, and build relationships with their peers.

Currently, Grace Weber's Music Lab is one of four grantees nation-wide to receive funding from the U.S. Presidential Scholars Foundation.

=== Musical influences ===
In terms of her singing, Weber has noted influences including "strong women": Eva Cassidy, Mariah Carey, Celine Dion, and India Arie, whereas her songwriting is inspired by poets including Joni Mitchell, Thom Yorke, and Patty Griffin.

== Discography ==
Projects

- Hope & Heart (2011)
- The Refinery (2014)

EPs

- How Did We Get Here (2020)

Albums

- A Beautiful Space (2021)
- A Beautiful Space (Deluxe) (2021)
- Paperflower (2023)
