= Acid Rap =

Mixtape by Chance the Rapper
- Released: April 30, 2013
- Recorded: 2012–2013
- Studios: Soundscape, Force One, Seven, & Classick in Chicago
- Genres: Hip-hop; jazz rap; acid jazz; psychedelic rap
- Length: 53:52; 50:15 (2019 re-release)
- Producers: Nate Fox; Peter Cottontale; Cam O'bi; Stefan Ponce; Ceej for Two-9; Nosaj Thing; DJ Ozone; Ludwig Göransson; brandUn DeShay; Blended Babies; Jake One; Na'el Shehade

Chance the Rapper chronology
10 Day (2012)	Acid Rap (2013)	Surf (2015)

Singles from Acid Rap
- 1. "Juice" Released: January 31, 2013; 2. "Acid Rain" Released: February 22, 2013

Acid Rap is the second mixtape by American rapper Chance the Rapper. The project is a sequel to his debut studio mixtape, 10 Day. The mixtape was recorded from 2012 to 2013 in Soundscape, Force One, Seven, and Classick, all studios based in Chance's home city of Chicago. The mixtape was produced by Nate Fox and Peter Cottontale (later of Chance's group the Social Experiment), Cam O'bi, Stefan Ponce, Two-9 member Ceej, Nosaj Thing, DJ Ozone, Ludwig Göransson, Odd Future member Brandun DeShay, Blended Babies, Jake One, and Na'el Shehade. The project features artists such as BJ the Chicago Kid, Lili K., Nosaj Thing, fellow Savemoney member Vic Mensa, Twista, Noname, Saba, Childish Gambino, Action Bronson, and Ab-Soul.

Before the mixtape was released, it was accompanied by two singles: "Juice" on January 31, 2013 (doubling as Chance's debut solo single) and "Acid Rain" on February 22, 2013. The project was later released on April 30, 2013, as a free digital download. After release, the mixtape charted at number 5 on the Billboard 200, number 3 on the Top R&B/Hip-Hop Albums chart, number 2 on the Top Rap Albums chart, and number 18 on the Billboard Canadian Albums chart. In July 2013, the mixtape reached number 63 on the Billboard Top R&B/Hip-Hop Albums chart due to bootleg downloads on iTunes and Amazon not affiliated with the artist.

The mixtape has been certified "diamond" on the mixtape site DatPiff for garnering over 1,000,000 downloads. It was re-released on streaming services on June 21, 2019, alongside his previous mixtape 10 Day. A 10th anniversary "Complete Edition" was released soon after, including the full version of the lead single "Juice", which previously had not been available for streaming due to sampling issues.

== Background and production ==
Bennett has confirmed that LSD was used during the mixtape's recording, stating "[There] was a lot of acid involved in Acid Rap. I mean, it wasn't too much – I'd say it was about 30 to 40 percent acid... more so 30 percent acid." He has also made it clear that LSD's involvement was just a small factor in the making of the mixtape. Bennett explained, "It wasn't the biggest component at all. It was something that I was really interested in for a long time during the making of the tape, but it's not necessarily a huge factor at all. It was more so just a booster, a bit of fuel. It's an allegory to acid, more so than just a tape about acid."

Bennett used artists and producers from Chicago with whom he had collaborated before. The acid jazz sound of the mixtape can be attributed to the collaboration of artists and producers from multiple genres. Bennett remarked, "People that I worked with on other projects from multiple genres just came together to make a dope tape." Bennett attributes most of the funky or jazz sound to Peter Cottontale, saying, "Peter Cottontale is a really sick jazz pianist."

Bennett describes Acid Rap as more of a music-based album and less of a story-based album when compared to his previous mixtape. When asked to compare 10 Day to Acid Rap, Bennett said, "Acid Rap is just a whole different monster; it's me as an adult making great music instead of a kid trying to explain a story. It's less of a conceptual project. It's still very cohesive, storytelling-wise, and its own project. But it's more music-based than story-based this time. I'm still telling the story of what it's like coming out of high school, not going to college, and my experience with LSD. The new music that I started listening to has got a really heavy Acid Jazz base to it. It's just really good songs; it's a collection of great songs, which is exactly what #10Day is. But it's more of just a really good album than a story."

The cover art for Acid Rap was based on a real picture taken at South by Southwest, an annual conglomerate of film, interactive media, and music festivals and conferences that take place in mid-March in Austin, Texas. The picture was taken by Brandon Breaux, who also designed the cover art for Bennett's previous mixtape 10 Day. The picture happened by chance, according to Breaux: "I had made these tie-dye tank tops before we went to SXSW and I gave them to Chance... In the back of my mind, I'm like, I hope you wear this."

== Release and reception ==
Professional ratings
Aggregate scores
Source	Rating
AnyDecentMusic?	8.1/10
Metacritic	86/100
Review scores
Source	Rating
AllMusic	4.5/5 stars
The A.V. Club	A−
Consequence of Sound	4/5 stars
Fact	4/5
MSN Music (Consumer Guide)	A−
Pitchfork	8.4/10
PopMatters	8/10
Rolling Stone	4/5 stars
Spin	8/10
XXL	4/5

Acid Rap was released on April 30, 2013, after two singles from the project ("Juice" and "Acid Rain") were released on January 13 and February 22, 2013. The project was released as a mixtape and not an album. Bennett has stated, "One of my biggest talents is performing live," and considered live performances and selling merchandise a more important source of income than recorded music, which he wanted to release for free. More recently, he has also rapped about his hatred for record labels on "No Problem". Bennett, being unsigned, also had the ability to collaborate with any available artist. The mixtape peaked at number 5 on the Billboard 200, number 3 on the Top R&B/Hip-Hop Albums chart, number 2 on the Top Rap Albums chart, and number 18 on the Billboard Canadian Albums chart. The album would later chart on the Top R&B/Hip-Hop Albums at number 63, due to bootlegs on iTunes and Amazon.

Acid Rap was met with widespread critical acclaim. At Metacritic, which assigns a normalized rating out of 100 to reviews from mainstream publications, the mixtape received an average score of 86, based on 21 reviews. It was also nominated for Best Mixtape at the 2013 BET Hip Hop Awards. The mixtape was ranked at number two on Spin's list and number 26 on Rolling Stone's list of the 50 best albums of 2013, and first on their list of best mixtapes of 2013. It was the second most downloaded mixtape on MixtapeMonkey.com. It was also ranked at number 12 on Pitchfork's Top 50 Albums of 2013. President Barack Obama added the song "Acid Rain" to his 2016 summer playlist.

In November 2018, The Nicholls Worth included Acid Rap in its list of the best mixtapes of the past decade, alongside A Love Letter to You (Trippie Redd, 2017), Days Before Rodeo (Travis Scott, 2014), No Ceilings (Lil Wayne, 2009), Barter 6 (Young Thug, 2015), and Luv Is Rage (Lil Uzi Vert, 2015). In 2019, Pitchfork listed it at number 84 on its top 200 albums of the decade. That same year, on June 28, Bennett officially released the mixtape onto streaming services along with his prior mixtape 10 Day. The track "Juice" did not have its sample cleared and is instead replaced by a 30-second voice memo by Bennett. It was later included in a 10th anniversary Complete Edition, with the original version of "Juice". In 2022, Rolling Stone ranked the album #36 in their list of the greatest hip-hop albums of all time.

== Track listing ==
Credits adapted from Tidal and the album's vinyl liner notes, and reflect the 2019 re-release.

No.	Title	Writer(s)	Producer(s)	Length
1.	"Good Ass Intro" (featuring BJ the Chicago Kid)	Chancelor Bennett; Bryan J. Sledge; Lilliana Kryzanek; Kiara Lanier; Peter Wilkins; Will Miller; J.P. Floyd; Cameron Osteen; Stefan Ponce; Lonnie Lynn; Kanye West; John Stephens; Dewayne Julius Rogers Sr.	Chance the Rapper; Peter Cottontale; Cam O'bi; Ponce	3:59
2.	"Pusha Man" (featuring Nate Fox)	Bennett; Charles Jennings; Nate Fox; Dave Grusin; Curtis Mayfield	Chance the Rapper; Sushi Ceej	2:19
3.	"Paranoia" (featuring Lili K. and Nosaj Thing)	Bennett; Jason Chung	Chance the Rapper; Nosaj Thing	4:35
4.	"Cocoa Butter Kisses" (featuring Vic Mensa and Twista)	Bennett; Victor Mensah; Carl Mitchell; Osteen; Wilkins	Chance the Rapper; Cam O'bi; Peter Cottontale	5:07
5.	"Juice"	Bennett; Fox; Donny Hathaway; John Lennon	Chance the Rapper; Fox	3:35
6.	"Lost" (featuring Noname)	Bennett; Fatimah Warner; Fox; Wilkins; Willie Hutch	Chance the Rapper; Fox	3:04
7.	"Everybody's Something" (featuring Saba and BJ the Chicago Kid)	Bennett; DJ O-Zone; Chuck Mangione; Roger Kay Karshner; James Yancey; Titus Glover	Chance the Rapper; DJ O-Zone	4:36
8.	"Interlude (That's Love)"	Bennett; Ludwig Göransson	Chance the Rapper; Göransson	2:29
9.	"Favorite Song" (featuring Childish Gambino)	Bennett; Fox; Donald Glover II; Willie Clarke; Clarence Reid	Chance the Rapper; Fox	3:05
10.	"NaNa" (featuring Action Bronson)	Bennett; Brandon Rudolph; Ariyan Arslani; Freddie Hubbard	Chance the Rapper; Brandun DeShay	3:20
11.	"Smoke Again" (featuring Ab-Soul)	Bennett; Herbert Stevens IV; Richard Neville Parry; Jonathan Keller	Chance the Rapper; Blended Babies	4:32
12.	"Acid Rain"	Bennett; Jacob Dutton	Chance the Rapper; Jake One	3:36
13.	"Chain Smoker"	Bennett; Fox; Felix Pappalardi; John Ventura; Leslie Weinstein; Norman Landsberg	Chance the Rapper; Fox	3:30
14.	"Everything's Good (Good Ass Outro)"	Bennett; Osteen	Chance the Rapper; Cam O'bi	5:33
Total length:				53:50

Notes

- "Paranoia" was included as a hidden track following "Pusha Man" for the original mixtape release, with Nosaj Thing's contributions receiving no credit. The 28 seconds of silence that separated the two tracks was omitted entirely on the 2019 streaming re-release and vinyl release. The 2023 'complete edition', released on streaming services to commemorate the mixtape's tenth anniversary, restores 15 seconds of silence between the two tracks.
- "Juice" was replaced by a 30-second voice memo for the 2019 streaming re-release and was omitted entirely on the vinyl release. After clearing the requisite sample, the song made its streaming debut on the 2023 'complete edition' release.

Samples

- "Good Ass Intro" contains a sample of "Intro", written by Kanye West; and embodies portions of "Faithful", written by Lonnie Lynn, John Stephens, Dewayne Julius Rogers Sr. and West.
- "Pusha Man" contains a sample and embodies portions of "Modaji", performed and written by Dave Grusin; and contains an interpolation of "Pusherman", written by Curtis Mayfield.
- "Juice" contains a sample of "Jealous Guy", performed by Donny Hathaway and written by Hathaway and John Lennon.
- "Lost" contains a sample and embodies portions of "Brother's Gonna Work It Out", performed and written by Willie Hutch.
- "Everybody's Something" contains an interpolation of "Diana in the Autumn Wind", written by Roger Kay Karshner and Chuck Mangione; and contains a sample and embodies portions of "Fall in Love", performed by Slum Village and written by James Yancey, R.L. Altman and Titus Glover.
- "Favorite Song" contains samples and embodies portions of "Clean Up Woman", performed by Betty Wright and written by Willie Clarke and Clarence Reid.
- "NaNa" contains samples from "Red Clay", written by Freddie Hubbard and performed by Jack Wilkins.
- "Chain Smoker" contains samples from "Long Red (Live)", written by Felix Pappalardi, John Ventura, Leslie Weinstein and Norman Landsberg.

== Personnel ==
- Brandon Breaux – artwork
- OJ Hays – "Acid Rap" typeface
- Elton "L10mixedit" Chueng – engineering, mixing, mastering
- Na'el Shehade – engineer, producer
- Alex "PapiBeatz" Baez – engineering
- Andrew Barber – Founder of Fake Shore Drive
- Su$h! Ceej – Member of Two-9, producer ("Pusha Man")
- Peter CottonTale – Music Director, Producer ("Good Ass Intro," "Cocoa Butter Kisses")
- brandUn DeShay (Ace Hashimoto) – producer ("NaNa")
- J.P. Floyd – Trombonist, featured artist ("Good Ass Intro")
- Nate Fox – Member of the Social Experiment, featured artist ("Pusha Man"), producer ("Juice," "Lost," "Favorite Song," "Chain Smoker")
- Alex Fruchter – Founder of Closed Sessions
- Rich Gains – Member of Blended Babies, producer ("Smoke Again")
- Ludwig Göransson – producer ("Interlude [That's Love]")
- JP – Member of Blended Babies, producer ("Smoke Again")
- Kiara Lanier – singer, featured artist ("Good Ass Intro")
- Lili K – singer, featured artist ("Good Ass Intro," "Pusha Man")
- Mike Kolar – engineer, owner of Soundscape Studios, founder of Closed Sessions
- Vic Mensa – rapper, featured artist ("Cocoa Butter Kisses")
- Cam O'bi – producer ("Good Ass Intro," "Cocoa Butter Kisses," "Everything's Good [Good Ass Outro]")
- Stefan Ponce – producer ("Good Ass Intro")
- Nico Segal – Trumpeter, member of the Social Experiment
- Twista – rapper, featured artist ("Cocoa Butter Kisses")
- Austin Vesely – director ("Juice," "Everybody's Something," "NaNa")

== Charts ==
Chart (2013)	Peak position
US Heatseekers Albums (Billboard)	26
US Top R&B/Hip-Hop Albums (Billboard)	63
Chart (2019)	Peak position
Canadian Albums (Billboard)	19
US Billboard 200	5
US Top R&B/Hip-Hop Albums (Billboard)	3
