= The Record Man =

- Directed by: Mark Moormann
- Produced by: Mark Moormann; Mitch Egber; Debbie Egber
- Starring: Henry Stone; Willie Clarke; Harry Wayne Casey; Clarence Reid; Bobby Caldwell
- Release date: 2015
- Country: United States
- Language: English

The Record Man is a 2015 documentary directed by Mark Moormann.

== Overview ==
The Record Man tells the story musical underdogs led by one man, Henry Stone, who gifted the Miami music sound to the world.

== Critical reception ==
Rolling Stone, "Mark Moorman’s The Record Man shed some equally welcome light on some behind-the scenes heavyweights who have “left the building” — Who managers Kit Lambert and Chris Stamp, and Miami music mogul Henry Stone."

The Tampa Tribune, "Moormann’s latest documentary celebrates the history of disco through the story of one of its biggest influences — the late Miami music producer and record executive Henry Stone."
