= 10 Day =

Mixtape by Chance the Rapper
- Released: April 3, 2012
- Recorded: 2011
- Genres: Hip hop; cloud rap; jazz rap
- Length: 52:19
- Producers: Apollo Brown; Bacchus; Beirut; Blended Babies; Caleb James; Chuck Inglish; DJ SuchNSuch; Flying Lotus; Lex Luger; MC Tree; MF Love; Peter Cottontale; Prince Talent; Professor Zak; Renzell; THEMPeople

Chance the Rapper chronology
10 Day (2012)	Acid Rap (2013)

10 Day is the debut mixtape by American rapper Chance the Rapper. It was released independently on April 3, 2012, as a free digital download. The mixtape was downloaded over 400,000 times on mixtape site DatPiff, and over 235,000 times on MixtapeMonkey. 10 Day was released on commercial streaming platforms in June 2019, followed by a vinyl release.

== Background and production ==
=== Background ===
Following a 10-day suspension in 2011 for possessing marijuana on his high school campus, Bennett recorded his first full-length project, called 10 Day. Prior to the mixtape, he was highlighted as one of Complex magazine's "10 New Chicago Rappers to Watch Out For." The mixtape features guest appearances from Vic Mensa, Sulaiman, and Nico Segal. The mixtape also includes production from Peter Cottontale, Chuck Inglish, Blended Babies, DJ SuchNSuch, MF Love, Flying Lotus, THEMPeople, Caleb James, Lex Luger. The mixtape would also garner the attention of Forbes magazine, as it was featured in the publication's Cheap Tunes column.

=== Cover art ===
The cover art to the mixtape shows a realistic cartoon drawing of Chance in a red jacket looking up to a sky full of clouds, with stylized, comic book looking text that reads "Chance the Rapper" and "10 DAY" in bold red letters above Chance. The artwork was done by Chicago artist Brandon Breaux, and was the first of many collaborations for the two, as Breaux also did the cover art for the two following mixtapes, Acid Rap and Coloring Book. Breaux also worked on the artwork for Chance's 2018 singles "Wala Cam", "65th and Ingleside" and "Work Out".

==== Title ====
The title came from Chance The Rapper’s 10-day high school suspension.

=== Sampling ===
The song "Long Time" features a sample from the song "Nantes" by Beirut, originally released in 2007 and featured on their album "The Flying Club Cup." Additionally, the track "Prom Night" features a sample from the 1979 song "So Good, So Right" by Brenda Russell, and "Family" samples the 1977 track "You're Not Fooling Me" by the band Angel.

== Reception ==
While reviews of 10 Day upon its initial release were scarce, the mixtape has since received recognition for being what launched the now superstar Chance the Rapper into fame. On the music site 'The West Review', critic Joe Stevens described the mixtape as a "notably creative piece of music."

== Merchandise ==
Following the success of the mixtape, Chance put out a line of apparel and products all marked with the 10 Day logo. The items include long sleeve and short sleeve shirts, crewnecks, basketball shorts, a lighter and a vinyl copy of the mixtape. All of these products can be purchased on his website, chanceraps.com, and a digital edition of the mixtape is included with every purchase made.

== Track listing ==
Credits adapted from Tidal.

No.	Title	Writer(s)	Producer(s)	Length
1.	"14,400 Minutes"	Chancelor J. Bennett; Marcus R. Prince	DJ SuchNSuch	2:12
2.	"Nostalgia"	Bennett; MF Love	MF Love	3:23
3.	"Missing You"	Bennett; Craig Thomas	Bacchus	3:24
4.	"Windows" (featuring Alex Wiley and Akenya Seymour)	Bennett; Wiley; Semour; Apollo Brown	Brown	2:59
5.	"Brain Cells"	Bennett; Peter Wilkins	Peter Cottontale	4:56
6.	"Long Time"	Bennett; Zach Condon	Beirut	3:45
7.	"22 Offs"	Bennett; Steven Ellison	Flying Lotus	1:49
8.	"U Got Me Fucked Up"	Bennett; Evan Ingersoll	Chuck Inglish	2:55
9.	"Family" (featuring Vic Mensa and Sulaiman)	Bennett; Sulaiman Shabazz; Victor Kwesi Mensah; Richard Neville Parry; Jonathan Paul Keller	Blended Babies	4:05
10.	"Juke Juke"	Bennett; Caleb James	James	4:09
11.	"Fuck You Tahm Bout"	Bennett; Lex Luger	Luger	4:13
12.	"Long Time II" (featuring Nico Segal)	Bennett; Nico Segal; Lon Rudolph; Wilkins	Renzell; Peter Cottontale	3:57
13.	"Prom Night"	Bennett; Prince; Rudolph	Prince Talent; DJ SuchNSuch; Renzell	5:28
14.	"Hey Ma" (featuring Lili K. and Peter Cottontale)	Bennett; Tremaine Johnson; Zachary Laev Jablow	MC Tree; Professor Zak	5:04
Total length:				52:19

Notes

- "Windows" contains an uncredited sample of "Bridge Through Time" by Lonnie Liston Smith; the song was not included on the commercial streaming re-release for over 48 hours before being added to the commercial release.

== Charts ==
Chart (2019)	Peak position
US Billboard 200	73
