= Brandon Breaux =

American artist

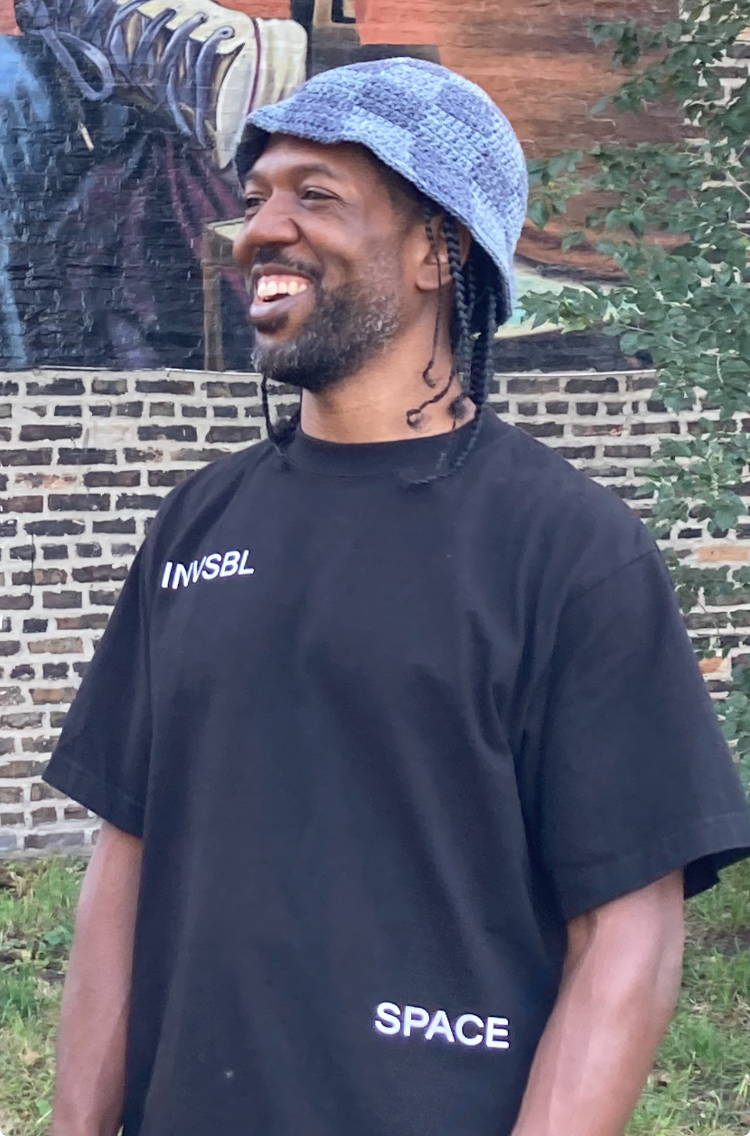
- Brandon Breaux in Washington Park at the unveiling of his SEEN mural
- Born: South Side, Chicago, Illinois
- Education: DePaul University
- Known for: Contemporary art
- Awards: Ebony POWER 100

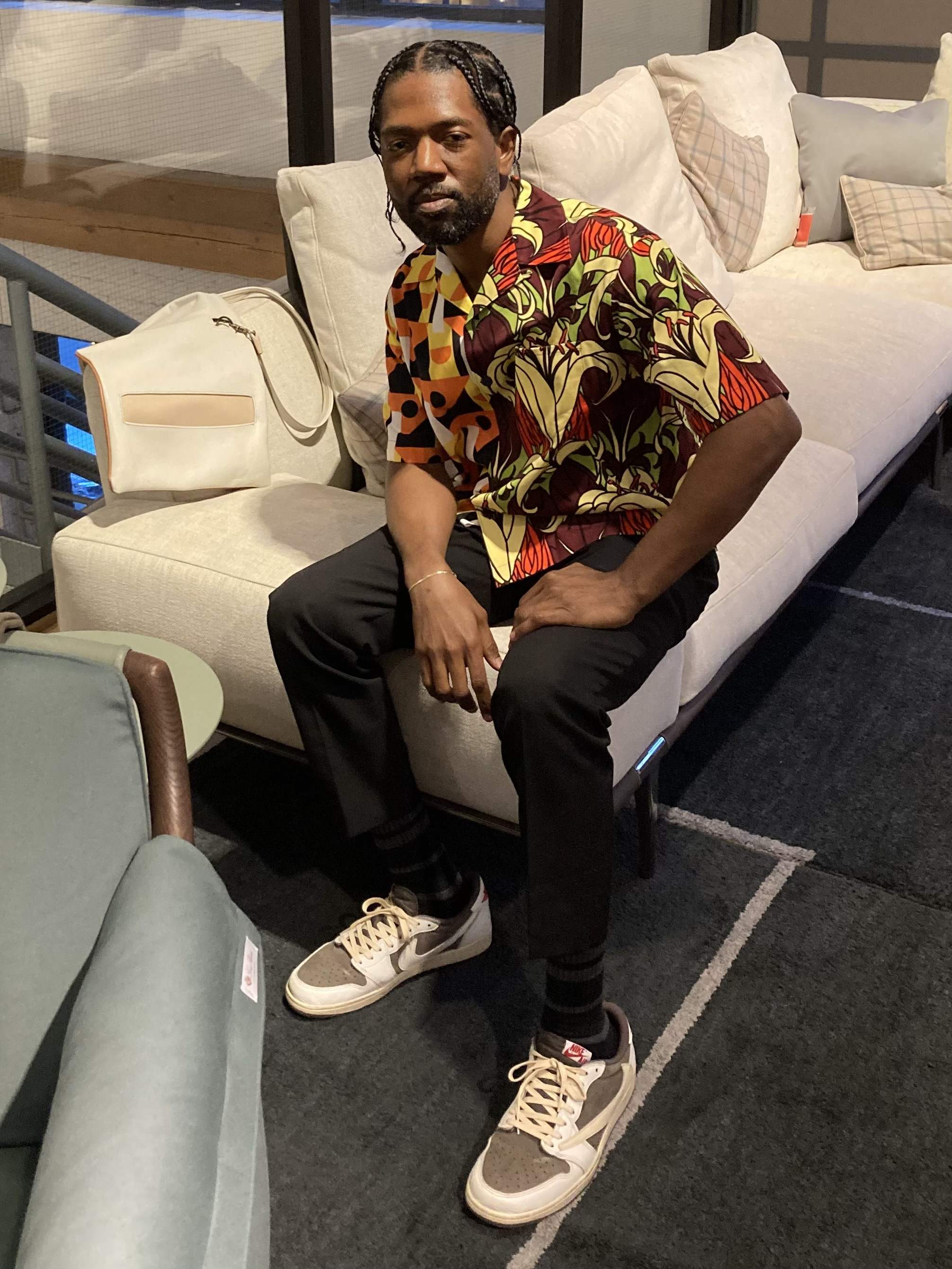
Breaux after giving an artist talk at Luminaire in Chicago

Brandon Breaux is a multi-disciplinary artist from Chicago whose work includes oil-on-canvas and digital art.

== Early life and education ==
Breaux grew up in the Chatham and Grand Crossing neighborhoods on the South Side of Chicago. Breaux graduated from DePaul University in 2006.

== Career ==
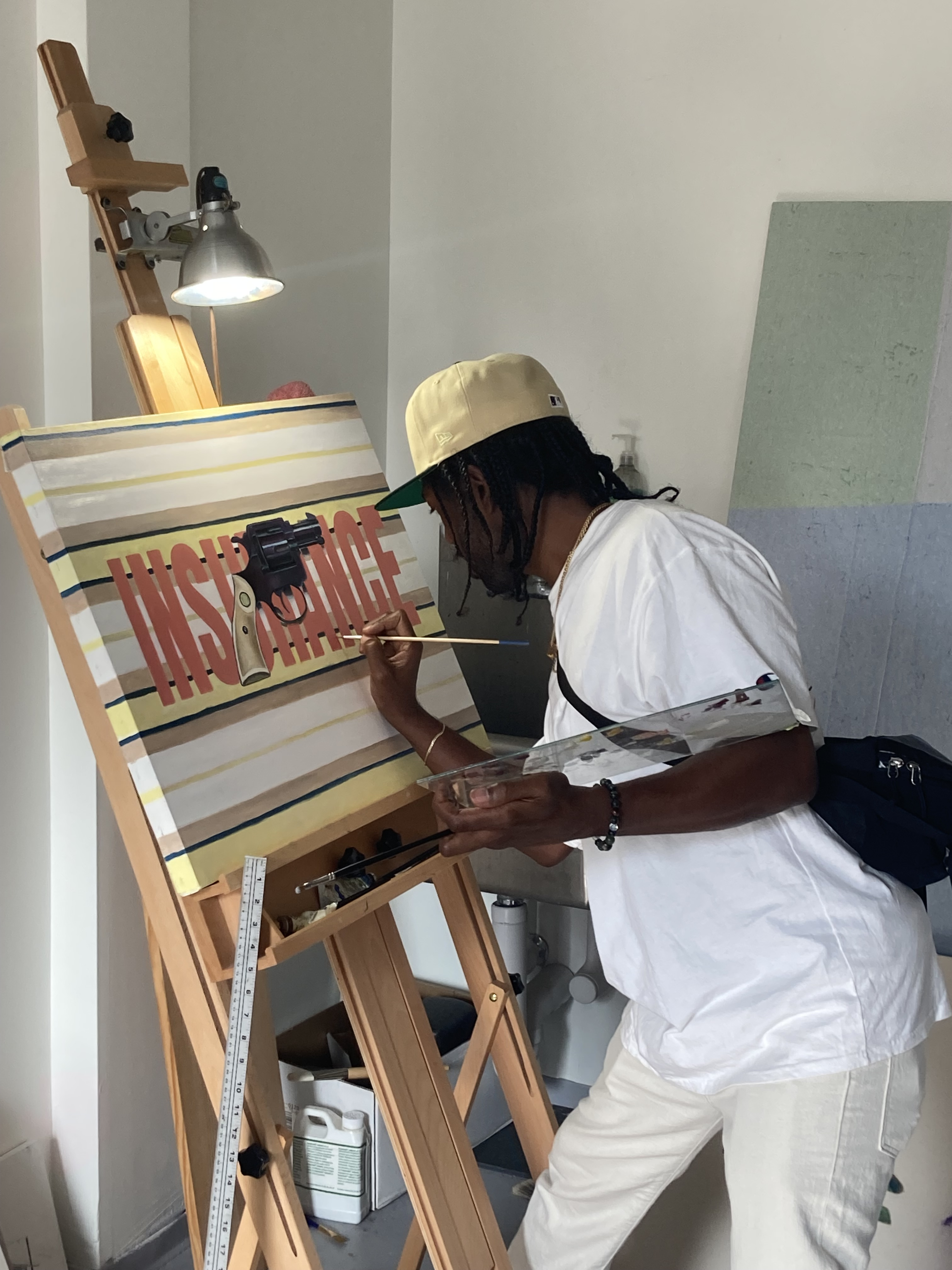
Breaux in the studio at Hyde Park Art Center

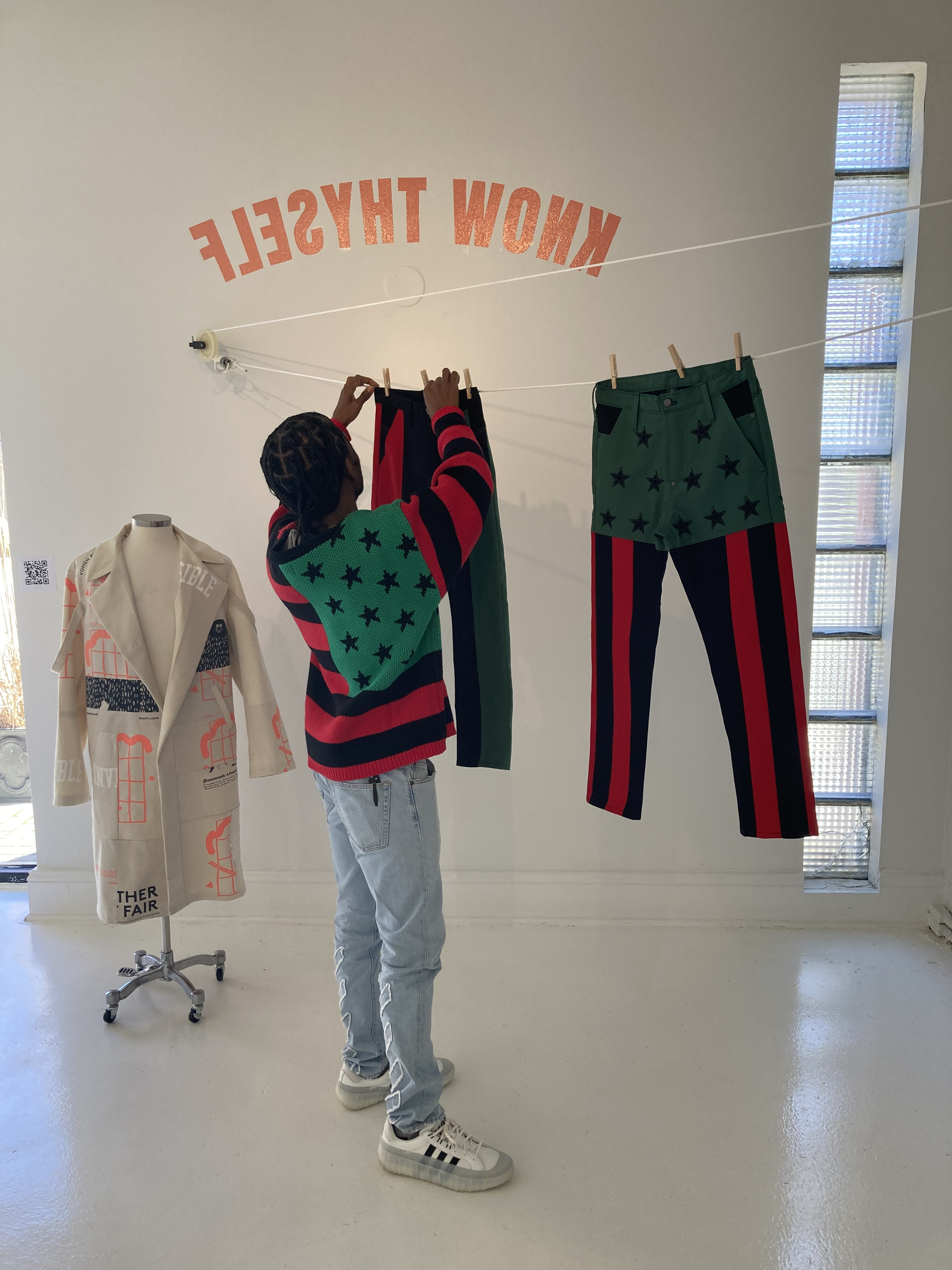
Breaux before the opening of his solo show BIG WORDS at Blanc Art Gallery in Chicago

Breaux's work focuses on representation of his culture on the South Side of Chicago and his advocacy for mental health, especially in the Black community.

Breaux created the cover art to the 2012 Chance the Rapper debut mixtape 10 DAY. Breaux also created the cover art for the Acid Rap and Coloring Book mixtapes, and Chance's 2018 singles "Wala Cam", "65th and Ingleside" and "Work Out".

Breaux shot the original photo and created the cover art for Acid Rap. The picture happened by chance, according to Breaux: "I had made these tie-dye tank tops before we went to SXSW and I gave them to Chance… In the back of my mind I'm like I hope you wear this."

The cover artwork Breaux created for Coloring Book depicted Chance holding his baby daughter, capturing his facial expression but with the baby outside the frame of the image.

Following the publication of the cover art for Chance the Rapper, artists including Drake, Kehlani, Miguel, and Troye Sivan have released album cover art showing Breaux's influence.

His debut U.S. solo exhibition, BIG WORDS, included painting, print, and fashion design, and was curated by Anna Cerniglia and Alison Cuddy for Blanc Gallery. In a review for Dazed, Vanessa Murrell noted the exhibition's use of typography and figures to stimulate the viewer's right and left brain functions.

Ebony magazine published Breaux's commissioned portrait of fashion icon André Leon Talley on its cover.

Civil Rights Movement pioneer Congressman John Lewis commissioned a portrait by Breaux for the cover of his final published work, Carry On: Reflections for a New Generation.

In 2020, Breaux collaborated with the Museum of Contemporary Art on a capsule collection.

In 2022, Breaux was selected in a cohort of 14 master artists and designers to be part of Dorchester Industries Experimental Design Lab, a partnership of the Prada Group, Theaster Gates Studio, Dorchester Industries, and Rebuild Foundation.

In 2022 the Kennedy Center selected Breaux for its "Office Hours" curated developmental artist residency program.

In August 2024, the Chicago Transit Authority wrapped Breaux's SEEN on trains as part of a public art exhibition titled “Track(ed) Changes” coinciding with the 2024 Democratic National Convention.

In 2024 Breaux continued long-term collaboration with Emerald South EDC on a public art mural installation of his SEEN oil-on-canvas painting. The mural, in the Washington Park neighborhood, has augmented reality functionality.

Breaux created the album cover for Chance The Rapper's sophomore album Star Line, released on August 15, 2025.

== Awards and honors ==
In 2022 Ebony magazine named Breaux in its POWER 100 list of Black leaders.

== See also ==
- History of African Americans in Chicago
- Chatham, Chicago
- Theaster Gates
