= No Problem (Chance the Rapper song) =

Single by Chance the Rapper featuring Lil Wayne and 2 Chainz

from the album Coloring Book
- Released: May 26, 2016
- Recorded: 2016
- Genre: Hip hop
- Length: 5:05 (Album version); 4:20 (Clean/Radio edit)
- Songwriters: Chancelor J. Bennett; Ivan Rosenburg; Conor Szymanski; Dwayne Carter Jr.; Tauheed Epps; Peter Wilkins; Cameron Osteen; Jaime Woods; Jonathan Hoard; Lakeitsha Williams; Rachel Cato
- Producers: Chance the Rapper; Brasstracks; Cam O'bi; Peter CottonTale

Chance the Rapper singles chronology
"Show Me Love (Skrillex Remix)" (2016)	"No Problem" (2016)	"Summer Friends" (2016)

Lil Wayne singles chronology
"Order More" (2016)	"No Problem" (2016)	"Sucker for Pain" (2016)

2 Chainz singles chronology
"Watch Out" (2015)	"No Problem" (2016)	"Champions" (2016)

Music video
- "No Problem" on YouTube

"No Problem" is a song by American rapper Chance the Rapper featuring fellow American rappers Lil Wayne and 2 Chainz. The track, produced by Chance himself, along with Brasstracks, Cam O'bi, and Peter CottonTale, it was released on May 26, 2016 as the second single from his third mixtape Coloring Book.

== Background ==
The song was first teased on Chance's Snapchat in January 2016. It later premiered as an exclusive in Zane Lowe's Beats 1 radio program ahead of Chance's mixtape Coloring Book, which was released the following day.

== Critical reception ==
Rolling Stone named "No Problem" one of the 30 best songs of the first half of 2016, stating: "This streaming-only star sounds like he's giving an ultimatum to the record industry: 'If one more label try to stop me / It's gon' be some dreadhead niggas in your lobby.' But the gospel choir in the background makes it feel more like an ecstatic celebration of his blessings."

"No Problem" was included on several best-of-2016 song rankings. Billboard ranked it at number 13 on their "100 Best Pop Songs of 2016" list, while Pitchfork listed it at number 12 on their 100 best songs of 2016. Later, they ranked it at number 162 on their "200 Best Songs of the 2010s" list. Village Voice, in their annual Pazz & Jop mass critics poll of the year's best in music in 2016, ranked "No Problem" at number 11.

== Music video ==
The song's accompanying music video premiered on May 26, 2016 on Chance's YouTube channel. Directed by Austin Vesely and Chance the Rapper, the video features celebrity appearances from DJ Khaled and Young Thug, among others. By December 2020, the song's official music video has amassed over 150 million views, which makes it Chance's most viewed video on his YouTube channel.

== Live performances ==
Chance performed "No Problem" with Lil Wayne and 2 Chainz on The Ellen Show on September 15, 2016. Ten days later, he performed a solo version at his Magnificent Coloring Day festival on September 25, and also performed an encore remix with Skrillex.

== Commercial performance ==
Debuting at number 86 on the Billboard Hot 100 for the chart dated June 4, 2016, "No Problem" eventually peaked at number 43.

== Awards ==
Year	Awards Ceremony	Award	Results
2017	Grammy Awards	Best Rap Performance	Won
2017	Grammy Awards	Best Rap Song	Nominated

== Charts ==
=== Weekly charts ===
Chart (2016–2017)	Peak position
Canada Hot 100 (Billboard)	94
US Billboard Hot 100	43
US Hot R&B/Hip-Hop Songs (Billboard)	14
US Rhythmic Airplay (Billboard)	5

=== Year-end charts ===
Chart (2016)	Position
US Hot R&B/Hip-Hop Songs (Billboard)	41
US Rap Songs (Billboard)	28

== Certifications ==
Certifications for "No Problem"
Region	Certification	Certified units/sales
New Zealand (RMNZ)	2× Platinum	60,000^{‡}
United States (RIAA)	4× Platinum	4,000,000^{‡}
^{‡} Sales+streaming figures based on certification alone.
