= Same Drugs =

2016 song by Chance the Rapper

Song by Chance the Rapper

from the album Coloring Book
- Released: May 13, 2016
- Length: 4:17
- Label: Self-released
- Songwriters: Chancelor Bennett; Nate Fox; Peder Losnegård; Nico Segal; Francis Starlite; Peter Wilkins
- Producers: Chance the Rapper; Peter CottonTale; Francis and the Lights; Lido; Nico Segal

Music video
- "Same Drugs" on YouTube

"Same Drugs" is a song by American rapper Chance the Rapper, from his third mixtape Coloring Book (2016). It contains vocals from Eryn Allen Kane, and was produced by the Social Experiment members Peter CottonTale, Nico Segal (also a member of Savemoney with Chance), and Chance the Rapper himself, alongside Lido and Francis and the Lights.

The song, although not released as a single, earned gold certification by Recorded Music NZ (RMNZ) and charted at number 5 under the Billboard Bubbling Under Hot R&B/Hip-Hop Songs chart in the United States of America, becoming one of 9 non-single songs from Coloring Book to chart. The song also had a music video.

== Background and lyrics ==
Despite the song's title, "Same Drugs" does not reference substance use. Chance the Rapper addressed this misconception directly via Twitter:

Same Drugs isn't about drugs 😒

During a Reddit AMA session, Chance revealed that "Same Drugs" underwent approximately 20 different versions, describing it as the most challenging track to write. He also mentioned that an early version featured singer-songwriter Regina Spektor. Later, he expressed regret over not including her collaboration, tweeting:

Listening to old versions of the songs from Coloring Book. Same Drugs had Regina Spektor on it. Not using this may be my biggest mistake.

The lyrics are characterized by themes of nostalgia, loss, and the passage of time, with references to the story of Peter Pan and its 1991 film adaptation Hook serving as a central allegory.

== Critical reception ==
"Same Drugs" was met with critical acclaim. Adriane Pontecorvo of PopMatters wrote, "Layered with Peter Pan references, surreal puppet side characters, and marvelous guest vocalists, 'Same Drugs' is a masterpiece about growing up and growing apart." Tom Breihan of Stereogum wrote, "'Same Drugs' is a spare, fragile R&B campfire singalong," describing it as "heart-wrenchingly lovely".

== Music video ==
The official music video for "Same Drugs" was released on February 6, 2017, on YouTube. Directed by Jake Schreier, the video depicts Chance playing a piano alongside a puppet, reflecting the song's nostalgic tone. The video features an extended version of the song with additional vocal contributions from Eryn Allen Kane, Yebba, John Legend, Francis Starlite, and Macie Stewart.

== Live performances ==
On December 17, 2016, Chance the Rapper performed "Same Drugs" and "Finish Line / Drown" on Saturday Night Live, featuring guest vocals from Francis and the Lights and Noname, respectively.

== Charts ==
Chart performance for "Same Drugs"
| Chart (2016) | Peak position |
|---|---|
| US Bubbling Under R&B/Hip-Hop Songs (Billboard) | 5 |

== Certifications ==
Certifications for "Same Drugs"
| Region | Certification | Certified units/sales |
|---|---|---|
| New Zealand (RMNZ) | Gold | 15,000^{‡} |
^{‡} Sales+streaming figures based on certification alone.
