= Star Line (album) =

Studio album by Chance the Rapper
- Released: August 15, 2025
- Genre: Hip-hop
- Length: 67:48
- Label: Self-released
- Producers: 7000k.; 9three; Ambezza; Aneesa Strings; Ashton Sellars; August Vineberg; Austin Luera; Catherine Clark; Chance the Rapper; Darkchild; Demibby; DexLvL; Dwayne Verner Jr.; Ephra; Garren; Groove; Jac; KCdaproducer; Kuji; Lil Man; Lucien Parker; Mario Luciano; Mykelonthebeat; Nate Fox; Nico Segal; Obed; Peter CottonTale; Rhyan Douglas; Sam Barsh; Shanks; Smoko Ono; Stix; Thea Gustaffson; Tommy Parker; Void Stryker; XYNothing

Chance the Rapper chronology
The Big Day (2019)	Star Line (2025)

Singles from Star Line
- 1. "The Highs & the Lows" Released: June 17, 2022; 2. "Tree" Released: July 3, 2025

Star Line (stylized in all caps) is the second studio album by the American rapper Chance the Rapper. It was independently released on August 15, 2025. It follows his previous album, The Big Day (2019). It features guest appearances by BabyChiefDoit, BJ the Chicago Kid, Do or Die, Jamila Woods, Jay Electronica, Jazmine Sullivan, Lil Wayne, Lion Babe, Smino, TiaCorine, Vic Mensa, Young Thug, and Joey Bada$$.

The album was supported by the singles "The Highs & the Lows" and "Tree", alongside numerous promotional singles. The album was a moderate commercial success, debuting at number 22 on the US Billboard 200, and received generally positive reviews from critics, who largely considered the album a return to form for Chance the Rapper following the negative reception of The Big Day.

== Background ==
For years, he had teased the release of his album Star Line. The album serves as his fourth collaboration with Brandon Breaux, the visual artist who also created the artwork for 10 Day, Acid Rap, and Coloring Book, but not for the rapper's debut album, The Big Day. Earlier that month, he released the album's lead single, "Tree," and worked on the album with producer DexLvL.

According to Chance when interviewed backstage at Lollapalooza by Rolling Stone, he said the album is "steeped in travel and personal change, incorporating different life lessons, experiences, and sounds he encountered over the past several years". Inspirations for the album come from Chance's trips to Jamaica, Ghana and various art fairs around the world. The album is also inspired by Marcus Garvey's Black Star Line.

== Artwork ==
The album's artwork was designed by Brandon Breaux, who had previously designed all of Chance the Rapper's album covers except for The Big Day. The artwork for Star Line is a painting that depicts Chance with an aurora behind him.

== Release and promotion ==
The album's title was revealed under the working title Star Line Gallery on June 17, 2022, in the credits for "The Highs & the Lows" music video.

Between 2022 and 2025, he released several promotional singles for the album, including:

- "Child of God"
- "Wraith" (with Smoko Ono and Vic Mensa)
- "A Bar About a Bar"
- "The Highs & the Lows"
- "Yah Know" (with King Promise)
- "Buried Alive"
- "Together" (with DJ Premier)
- "Stars Out"
- "Bad Boys 2" (with Joey Purp)
- "3333"
- "Tree" (with Lil Wayne and Smino)

On July 31, 2025, Star Line Gallery's release date was confirmed to be August 15, 2025. On August 21, 2025, a music video for "Just a Drop" was released. On September 24, 2025, a remix to "Do or Die" featuring Twista was released. A music video for the song was released on October 10, 2025.

He embarked on the And We Back Tour in support of the album, which began on September 26, 2025, in Houston and concluded on October 20, 2025, in Los Angeles. In October 2025, Chance collaborated with the Chicago Transit Authority to run a train with a Star Line themed wrap on the Red Line.

== Songs ==
"Tree" praises the virtues of smoking marijuana and includes a sample from India Arie's single "Video".

== Critical reception ==
Professional ratings
Aggregate scores
Source	Rating
Metacritic	75/100
Review scores
Source	Rating
AllMusic	4/5 stars
Clash	8/10
Exclaim!	6/10
Pitchfork	5.9/10
Rolling Stone	4/5 stars

According to the review aggregator Metacritic, Star Line received "generally favorable reviews" based on a weighted average score of 75 out of 100 from 5 critic scores. Clash gave the album an 8/10, with critic Robin Murray writing that "STAR LINE is a feast from start to finish." For the Win gave it a highly positive review, with critic Cory Woodroof saying that "Chance the Rapper's latest project is an extraordinary comeback from a generational force."

In his review for Exclaim!, Wesley McLean highlights that at his best, Chance "is Lil Wayne's most earnest, wholesome son. His flow is malleable, his energy high, and his personality and charisma are undeniable," but notes that failed attempts to re-hash past highlights fall flat, and his attempts to go in new directions that "have a performative, theatre kid-esque quality to them that makes them impossible to connect with." Alphonse Pierre of Pitchfork described the album as a "missed opportunity" and that it was "rarely bad, just safe." Writing for Rolling Stone, Mosi Reeves praised the album's themes and called it a "remarkable return to form."

=== Year-end lists ===
Publication	Accolade	Rank	Ref.
Complex	The 50 Best Albums of 2025	22	
HotNewHipHop	The 40 Best Rap Albums of 2025	15	
HuffPost	The Best Albums of 2025	—N/a	
Rolling Stone	100 Best Albums of 2025	96	
Rolling Stone	The 25 Best Hip-Hop Albums of 2025	11	

== Track listing ==
No.	Title	Writer(s)	Producer(s)	Length
1.	"Star Side Intro"	Chancelor "Chance the Rapper" Bennett; Lolly; Peter "CottonTale" Wilkins	Chance the Rapper; DexLvL; Peter CottonTale	3:43
2.	"Ride" (featuring Do or Die)	Bennett; Dexter "DexLvL" Coleman; Denis "AK-47" Round; Darnell "Belo Zero" Smith	Chance the Rapper; DexLvL	2:59
3.	"No More Old Men" (featuring Jamila Woods)	Bennett; Mykel "Mykelonthebeat" Brown; Rhyan Douglas; Rodney "Darkchild" Jerkins; Antonio "KCdaproducer" Kearney"; Jabari "Jack Red" Rayford; Rachel Robinson	Darkchild; Demibby; KCdaproducer; Mykelonthebeat; Rhyan Douglas; Shanks; XYNothing	4:53
4.	"The Negro Problem" (featuring BJ the Chicago Kid)	Bennett; Aneesa "Strings" Al-Musawwir; Coleman; Darian "Smoko Ono" Garcia; Thomas "Tommy Parker" Lumpkins; Ashton Sellars; Bryan "BJ the Chicago Kid" Sledge	Aneesa Strings; Ashton Sellars; DexLvL; Smoko Ono; Tommy Parker	4:21
5.	"Drapetomania" (featuring BabyChiefDoit)	Bennett; Jayden "BabyChiefDoit" Jones	DexLvL	2:52
6.	"Back to the Go" (featuring Vic Mensa)	Bennett; Victor "Vic Mensa" Mensah	Ephra; Stix	4:20
7.	"The Highs & the Lows" (featuring Joey Badass)	Bennett; Coleman; Jo-Vaughn "Joey Badass" Scott	DexLvL	4:15
8.	"Space & Time"	Bennett; Coleman; Jacques "Jac" Hatch; Greg "Stix" Landfair Jr.; Lucien Parker; Dwayne Verner Jr.; Wilkins	9three; DexLvL; Dwayne Verner Jr.; Jac; Kuji; Peter CottonTale; Stix	3:52
9.	"Link Me in the Future"	Bennett; Sam Barsh; Coleman; Garcia; Garren Langford	DexLvL; Garren; Sam Barsh; Smoko Ono	4:05
10.	"Gun in Yo Purse" (featuring Young Thug and TiaCorine)	Bennett; Coleman; Lumpkins; Mathias "Ambezza" Liyew; Tia "TiaCorine" Shults; Jeffery "Young Thug" Williams	Ambezza; DexLvL; Tommy Parker	3:37
11.	"Tree" (featuring Lil Wayne and Smino)	Bennett; Dwayne "Lil Wayne" Carter Jr.; Coleman; Mensah; Christopher "Smino" Smith; Benjamin "Groove" Tolbert	DexLvL; Dwayne Verner Jr.; Groove; Peter CottonTale	4:27
12.	"Burn Ya Block"	Bennett; Coleman; Thea Gustafsson	August Vineberg; DexLvL; Thea Gustaffson	2:37
13.	"Letters"	Bennett; Coleman; Darryl "Lil Man" Howell; Robinson; Nico Segal; Verner Jr.; Wilkins	DexLvL; Dwayne Verner Jr.; Lil Man; Nico Segal; Peter CottonTale	4:11
14.	"Speed of Light" (featuring Lion Babe and BJ the Chicago Kid)	Bennett; Coleman; Nate Fox; Obed; Sledge; Wilkins	DexLvL; Nate Fox; Obed; Peter CottonTale	5:05
15.	"Pretty"	Bennett; Brandon "7000k." Johnson	7000k.	3:19
16.	"Just a Drop" (featuring Jay Electronica)	Bennett; Elpadaro "Jay Electronica" Allah; Berkay "Void Stryker" Birecikli; Catherine Clark; Landfair Jr.; Robsinson	Catherine Clark; Stix; Void Stryker	3:56
17.	"Speed of Love" (featuring Jazmine Sullivan)	Jazmine Sullivan	DexLvL; Mario Luciano; Peter CottonTale	5:16
Total length:				67:48

== Charts ==
Chart performance for Star Line
Chart (2025)	Peak position
US Billboard 200	22
US Independent Albums (Billboard)	3
US Top R&B/Hip-Hop Albums (Billboard)	5

== Release history ==
Region	Date	Format
Various	August 15, 2025	Digital download; streaming; CD
