= Merry Christmas Lil' Mama =

Mixtape by Jeremih and Chance the Rapper
- Released: December 22, 2016
- Recorded: December 2016
- Genres: Hip-hop; Christmas
- Length: 32:11
- Label: Self-released
- Producers: BJ Burton; Bongo; Carter Lang; C-Sick; Charlie Handsome; ChaseTheMoney; Digi; DJ Gant-Man; DJ Spinn; Flippa; Francis and the Lights; Garren Sean; Hit-Boy; J Proof; Smoke Ono; The Social Experiment; Zaytoven

Chance the Rapper chronology
Coloring Book (2016)	Merry Christmas Lil' Mama (2016)	The Big Day (2019)

Jeremih chronology
Late Nights: Europe (2016)	Merry Christmas Lil' Mama (2016)	Cinco De MihYo (2017)

Merry Christmas Lil' Mama is a collaborative Christmas mixtape by singer Jeremih and rapper Chance the Rapper. It is the fourth mixtape by Jeremih, and the fifth mixtape by Chance the Rapper. The mixtape was self-released via SoundCloud on December 22, 2016, and features collaborations with Noname, King Louie, and comedian Hannibal Buress, amongst others. The mixtape is dedicated to the city of Chicago.

The mixtape was reissued on December 19, 2017, as a double-disc mixtape titled Merry Christmas Lil' Mama Re-Wrapped. The mixtape contained nine new songs and a piano remix of "Stranger At The Table". Disc Two featured a returned guest appearance from Hannibal Buress and Chicagoan rapper Valee. A second reissue occurred in 2020, titled Merry Christmas Lil' Mama: The Gift that Keeps on Giving, featuring the previously unreleased songs "The Return", “Who’s to Say”, and “Let Me Bang”.

== Critical reception ==
Professional ratings
Review scores
Source	Rating
Consequence of Sound	B
Pitchfork	8.1/10
Vulture	Mixed

Craig Jenkins from Vulture called "All the Way" and "Snowed In" the mixtape's best tracks, despite calling the project "less like Christmas music and more like a fun, low-stakes love letter to both artists' place of birth". Pitchfork published a review of the mixtape's reissue in 2017, awarding it 7.7 out of 10.

== Track listing ==
Songwriting credits adapted from American Society of Composers, Authors and Publishers (ASCAP).

Merry Christmas Lil' Mama and Re-Wrapped Disc one
No.	Title	Writer(s)	Producer(s)	Length
1.	"All the Way"		Flippa; J Proof	3:37
2.	"Snowed In"		Carter Lang	4:11
3.	"Stranger at the Table"		C-Sick; Bongo	2:45
4.	"Joy"		The Social Experiment	4:12
5.	"I'm Your Santa"		Francis and the Lights	3:26
6.	"I Shoulda Left You"		Zaytoven	4:41
7.	"The Tragedy"		Bongo	3:24
8.	"Chi Town Christmas"	Chancelor Bennett; Jeremy Felton		2:01
9.	"Merry Christmas Lil' Mama"		C-Sick; DJ Spinn; DJ Gant-Man; The Social Experiment	3:56
Total length:				32:11

Re-Wrapped Disc two
No.	Title	Writer(s)	Producer(s)	Length
1.	"Down Wit That"		Hit-Boy	3:46
2.	"Lil Bit" (Interlude)			4:11
3.	"Held it Down"	Bennett; Jamil Chammas; Darian Garcia; Ryan Vojtesak	Smoke Ono; Charlie Handsome; Digi	3:02
4.	"Big Kid Again"			3:47
5.	"Let it Snow"			3:26
6.	"Family For"			3:29
7.	"Ms. Parker"		Smoke Ono; Garren Sean	3:29
8.	"One More Cry"		Smoke Ono; BJ Burton	4:09
9.	"Are U Live"	Bennett; Felton; Chase Rose; Valee Taylor	ChaseTheMoney	3:41
10.	"Stranger at the Table" (Piano Remix)			3:45
Total length:				36:49

Notes

- "All the Way" features vocals by Hannibal Buress and King Louie
- "Snowed In", "Joy", & "I'm Your Santa" features vocals from Teddy Jackson
- "I Shoulda Left You" features vocals by Lud Foe
- "The Tragedy" features vocals by Noname
- "Merry Christmas Lil Mama" features vocals by King Louie
- "Lil Bit (Interlude)" features vocals by Hannibal Buress
- "Are U Live" features vocals by Valee

== Personnel ==
- Common – drums
- Lena Waithe – drums
