= Clean Up Woman =

- Side A of the US single

Single by Betty Wright

from the album I Love the Way You Love
- B-side: "I'll Love You Forever"
- Released: November 1971
- Studio: Criteria (Miami)
- Genre: Funk; pop; R&B
- Length: 2:40
- Label: Alston
- Songwriters: Clarence Reid, Willie Clarke
- Producers: Clarence Reid, Willie Clarke

Betty Wright singles chronology
"Pure Love" (1970)	"Clean Up Woman" (1971)	"Baby Sitter" (1972)

Official audio
- "Clean up Woman" on YouTube

"Clean Up Woman" is a song by Betty Wright from her second studio album I Love the Way You Love (1972). Written and produced by Clarence Reid and Willie Clarke, it was released in November 1971 in the U.S. as a 7" single with "I'll Love You Forever" on the B-side. The song's distinctive guitar lick was played by "Willie "Little Beaver" Hale.

The song has sold over two million copies with the RIAA gold disc awarded on December 30, 1972. Billboard ranked it as the No. 49 song for 1972. The song also appears as the beginning and end songs in a medley on the 1978 album Betty Wright Live.

== Chart performance ==
The single reached No. 6 on the U.S. Billboard Hot 100 chart, spending fourteen weeks on the chart. It also reached No. 2 on the U.S. Soul Singles chart and remained in that spot for eight weeks, all behind "Let's Stay Together" by Al Green. It peaked at No. 4 on the Cash Box Top 100 singles chart during the weeks ending January 29, 1972 and February 5, 1972. In Canada, the song reached No. 39.

=== Weekly charts ===
Chart (1971–1972)	Peak position
Canada RPM Top Singles	39
U.S. Billboard Hot 100	6
U.S. Billboard R&B	2
U.S. Cash Box Top 100	4

=== Year-end charts ===
Chart (1972)	Rank
U.S. Billboard Hot 100	49
U.S. Cash Box	57

== Samples ==
The song has been sampled in at least 32 other songs, including the 2013 "Favorite Song" by Chance the Rapper featuring Childish Gambino from the mixtape Acid Rap and the 1993 remix of "Real Love" by Mary J. Blige.

== Legacy ==
The song was inducted into the Grammy Hall of Fame in 2021, not too long after Wright's death in 2020.
