= Cocoa Butter Kisses =

Song by Chance the Rapper featuring Vic Mensa and Twista

from the album Acid Rap
- Released: April 30, 2013
- Genre: Hip hop
- Length: 5:07
- Songwriters: Chancelor Bennett; Victor Mensah; Carl Mitchell; Cameron Osteen; Peter Wilkins
- Producers: Chance the Rapper; Cam O'bi; Peter Cottontale

"Cocoa Butter Kisses" is a song by American rapper Chance the Rapper from his second mixtape Acid Rap (2013). The song features fellow American rappers Vic Mensa and Twista, and was produced by Chance himself, alongside Cam O'bi, and Peter Cottontale, who are also credited as writers alongside Chance, Mensa, and Twista.

Despite not being released as a single, the song is one of Chance the Rapper's most popular songs to date and was certified gold by Recorded Music NZ (RMNZ), becoming the only song from the album to be certified, despite not charting. The song has also been covered by English-Albanian singer Dua Lipa.

== Background and production ==
At the time when the song was written, Vic Mensa was staying at an apartment in Humboldt Park, Chicago with his manager Cody Kazarian. Chance the Rapper visited one day and showed Mensa a verse and hook he had written earlier. Soon, Mensa began composing his part for the song. In an interview with DJ Booth, Cam O'bi stated that both Chance and Mensa wrote the song while "on mushrooms".

The song was originally recorded on a different instrumental and titled "Babies and Gunshots: Fuck Hawaii Pt. 2" (which, according to Mensa, was because "we were ruminating on the effects of violence in our community"). The original producer had already given the beat to another rapper and did not let Chance to use it, so Mensa put Cam O'bi in touch with Peter Cottonwood. The rappers asked the producers to remake the beat. In a jam session, Chance and Mensa repeatedly sang the hook while O'bi provided the drums on FL Studio and Cottonwood played chords on the keyboard. Once the producers had a chord progression and bassline ready, Mensa (as a member of Kids These Days) and Chance had to go on tour together for about a week. Upon Chance's request, O'bi finished production by the time they came back.

Chance the Rapper already had an idea of bringing Twista on the track as well. A few weeks after Chance and Mensa finished their verses, Twista recorded a third verse for the song. According to Twista, the song reminded him of being young, as well as memories of smoking marijuana when he became an adult.

== Composition and lyrics ==
Fred Thomas, in an AllMusic review of Acid Rap, wrote that the song "folds church organ swells and synthesizer swirls into its huge, straightforward beat". Chicago Tribune's Greg Kot noticed the use of a smoker's cough as percussion. Lyrically, the song centers on how the rappers' lifestyles of smoking and drugs has caused them to be apart from their families due to their disapproval. In his verse, Chance the Rapper sings about missing the memories of his childhood, such as VHS tapes of Nickelodeon shows, Chuck E. Cheese pizza, and the hymn "Jesus Loves Me".

Several reviewers have described the lyrics as about the smell of cigarette smoke, a person's smoking addiction, or the "long-gone days of youth". Boston Globe's Isaac Feldberg opined that the song portrays the consequences of smoking through a mother refusing to kiss her son due to his smell of cigarettes. Literary critic Adam Bradley calls the song a posse cut for the varying thematic direction of each rapper in a consistent beat.

== Dua Lipa version ==
In October 2013, English-Albanian singer Dua Lipa released a cover of the song on her SoundCloud channel. Its description reads:

"Hey guys this cover was not made to show my vocal abilities, It was simply just for fun while jamming in the studio with the amazing @marlonroudette . I kept it on a one tone range... as trying to sing/rap quickly was adventurous enough for the time being haha! Hope you like it, this is Cocoa Butter Kisses originally by Chance The Rapper"

== Certifications ==
Certifications for "Cocoa Butter Kisses"
Region	Certification	Certified units/sales
New Zealand (RMNZ)	Gold	15,000^{‡}
^{‡} Sales+streaming figures based on certification alone.
