= Mike Golden and Friends =

Indie band

Mike Golden and Friends (MG&F) is an American independent band from Chicago, Illinois, led by singer-songwriter Mike Golden. They started in 2009 when Golden dropped out of Purdue University to pursue music on a full-time basis.

MG&F was included in the 2014 Ubisoft video game release, Watch Dogs, with their song "No Number". This opportunity led to the MG&F song "Every Morning Love" being used by Walmart stores across the US. The band later received requests to perform in multiple festivals, including the Sundance Film Festival, Red Gorilla at SXSW, Indie Week Europe, Canadian Music Week, LoveFest, Center of The Universe, and Chance The Rapper's T.I.P. Fest. MG&F have had songs on Tony Hawk's Ride Channel and in multiple broadcast television shows.

== Features and collaborations ==
Golden has been featured on Donnie Trumpet's The Social Experiment download album, Surf, on the song "GO." Song features include Odd Couple Beats Chatterbox's "Talkin' Like That" and Stefan Ponce's "Kids." Golden has been covered as a crossover standout by sources (and Hype Machine Sources) like Vibe, Complex, Elevator, DJ Booth, The 405, Green Label, Fake Shore Drive, and Dynasty.

== Discography ==
- Trees pt 1
- Trees pt 2
- Groceries
- Utopia
- Golden
