= Willie Clarke (songwriter) =

American musician and songwriter

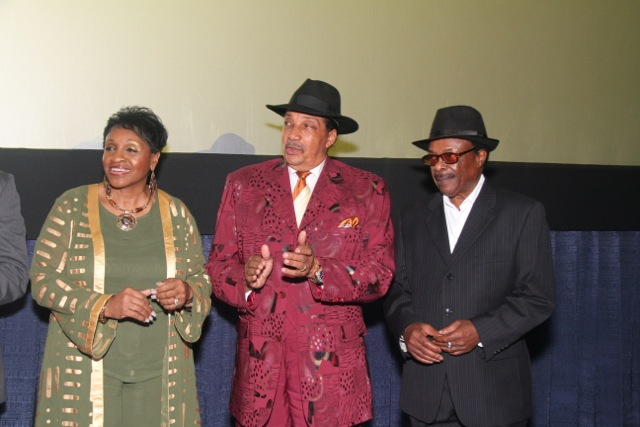
- Anita Ward, Raphael Munnings, and Willie Clarke at a film festival showing The Record Man

Background information
- Born: United States
- Genres: Rhythm and blues, soul
- Occupations: Songwriter, musician, record label owner
- Website: willieclarke.com (Archived)

Willie Clarke is an American musician and songwriter known for songs including "Clean Up Woman", "Rockin' Chair" and "Willing and Able."

Clarke and a college friend, Johnny Pearsall, started the record label Deep City, based out of Johnny's Records in Liberty City, Florida. It was the first African American owned independent record label in Florida.

Clarke was featured on the Miami 2015 episode of the CNN television show Anthony Bourdain: Parts Unknown.

== Deep City Records ==
Deep City Records was a record label run out of a music store in the Liberty City section of Miami. Clarke was one of the founders.

== See also ==
- TK Records
