= Lili K. =

American singer

Lili K
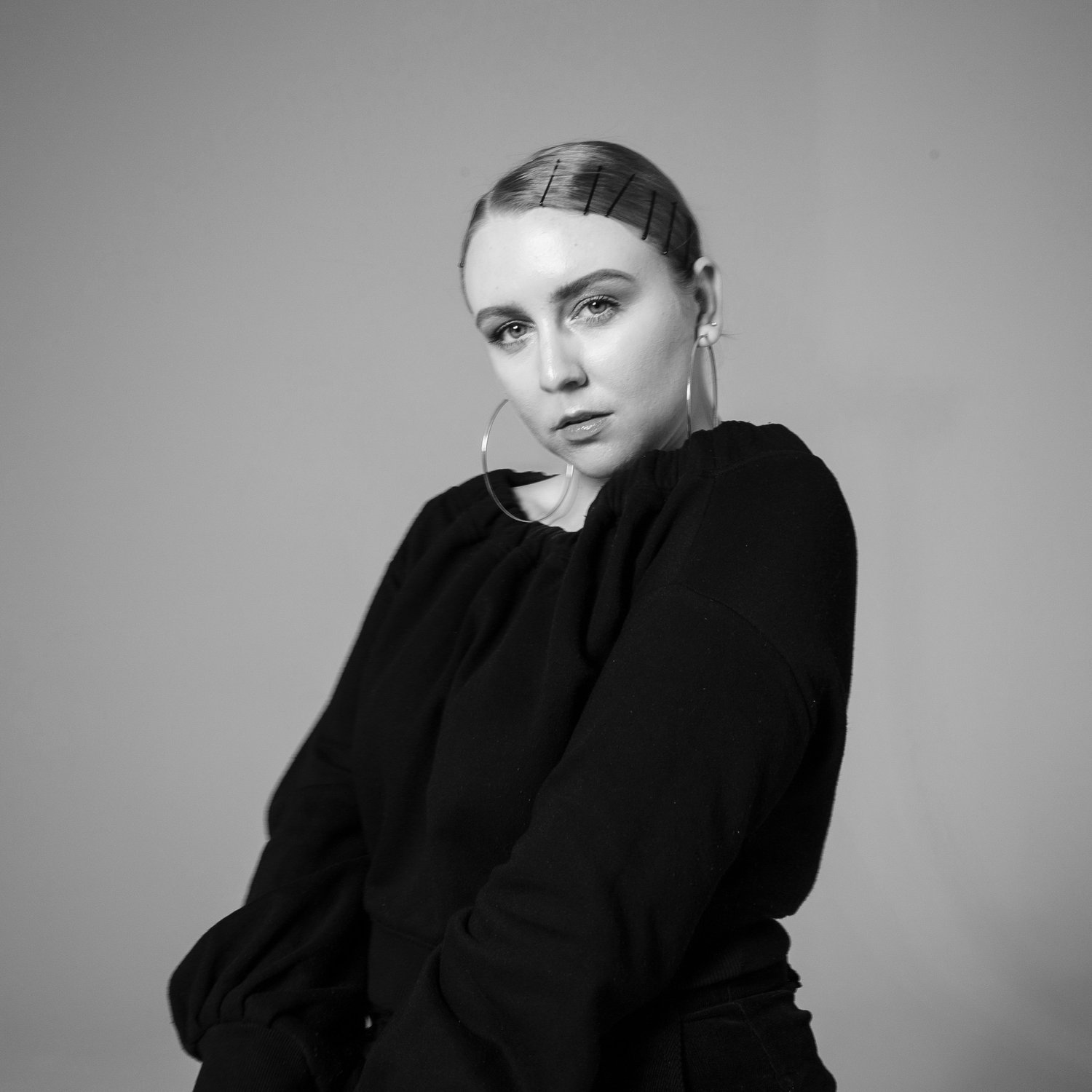
- Born: Lillianna Kryzanek; July 1, 1991 (age 35); Wisconsin, United States
- Education: Columbia College Chicago
- Musical career
- Genres: Jazz, Soul
- Occupations: Singer, songwriter
- Website: lilikmusic.com

Lillianna Kryzanek (born July 1, 1991), better known as her stage name Lili K., is an American jazz and soul vocalist and songwriter born in Milwaukee, Wisconsin and based in Chicago, Illinois. She released her debut album Ruby on April 21, 2015, after becoming widely known for her feature work with artists such as Chance the Rapper and Vic Mensa.

== Biography ==
Lili K was born on July 1, 1991, in Milwaukee, Wisconsin. Lili grew up between Chicago and San Diego. It was in San Diego that Lili K began singing in school and church, as well as writing music. Her mother moved them back to Milwaukee where Lili studied music at Roosevelt Middle School of the Arts and then Milwaukee High School of the Arts.

Lili studied jazz, opera, classical, gospel, and music theory at Milwaukee High School of the Arts, but it was jazz that really caught her attention. After high school she received a scholarship to Columbia College Chicago. She also met producer Peter Cottontale upon her move to Chicago in 2009. She graduated from Columbia College Chicago in December 2012 with a bachelor's degree in Arts, Entertainment, and Media Management, with a focus in Music Business.

She has been a large part of the Chicago music renaissance, as highlighted in the 2016 Chicago Magazine cover story. She has worked with Chance the Rapper, Vic Mensa, Twista, and The O'My's.

Lili K performs with The Lili K Band. Members consist of Phil Patterson on keyboards, Myron Cherry on drums & percussion, Matthew Skillz on bass, and Cullen Bogan on guitar.

== Career ==
Lili K entered the Chicago music scene with Peter Cottontale. The two became collaborators and released three EPs. Metal Petals, which includes contributions from Chance the Rapper and My Favorite Things, an EP of revamped jazz standards. Chicago Reader wrote that Lili K tends to blur genre lines in her solo work, which led to her to work with hip-hop producers and MCs.

Lili K has performed at Made in America, SXSW, and North Coast Music Fest as a main act, as well as Lollapalooza, Pitchfork, and Summerfest as a background vocalist for numerous artists. Her performances with The Lili K Band at Made in America, North Coast, and SXSW 2015 were met with acclaim.

On April 21, 2015, Lili K released her debut album, Ruby with independent Chicago label Freshly Baked. The album was executively produced by Lili K. and was written and recorded by her and The Lili K Band at Mibal Studios in Chicago.

Jay Z's streaming service, Tidal, named Lili K as their first ever Tidal Rising artist – their feature aimed at emerging artists. After exclusively streaming Ruby a week before its official release, Tidal released a docu-series profiling Lili and her life in Chicago. They went on to book her as the headlining act on their Tidal Stage at Made in America 2015.

She was named Best Jazz Artist by the Chicago Reader in 2015.

In 2017, Lili K appeared as a recurring background vocalist on FOX's hit show Empire. In 2019, she released her self-produced EP 'Songs With Friends'

== Discography ==
=== EPs ===
Metal Petals (2012)

1. "Curtain Call"
2. "Never Ever"
3. "Don't Worry"
4. "Ambitious ft. Sulaiman & Chance the Rapper"
5. "Highlight the Moon"
6. "My Name Is [Remix]"
7. "One Date [Remix]"

My Favorite Things (2011)

1. "Interlude"
2. "Come Sunday"
3. "Solar System"
4. "Summertime Valentine"

Songs With Friends (2019)

1. "Will You Still Call ft. The O’My’s"
2. "Right Here ft. Klssik"
3. "Hocus Pocus ft. B-Free"
4. "Fall ft. Evan Lane"
5. "Big Bang ft. Air Credits"

=== Singles ===
1. "Magic" 2016
2. "Best Friend" 2017
3. "Pride and Love ft. Jeremy Jones" 2020
4. "Bluff ft. Jeremy Jones" 2020

=== Albums ===
Ruby (2015)

1. "Mama Told Me"
2. "Pour Some Shuga"
3. "I Don't Want You No More"
4. "One Mo Time"
5. "Hold On"
6. "Know Enough"
7. "Forgive Me"
8. "Tommy"
9. "Refreshing"
10. "Work Of Art"

=== Features ===
Chance the Rapper

1. "Hey Ma"
2. "Good Ass Intro"
3. "Good Ass Outro"
4. "Pusha Man"

Donnie Trumpet & SOX

1. "Go"

Vic Mensa

1. "Hollywood LA"
2. "Lovely Day"

MC Tree

1. "Say How You Feel"

Klassik

1. "This Is That New"
