= Surf (Donnie Trumpet & The Social Experiment album) =

Studio album by Donnie Trumpet & The Social Experiment
- Released: May 28, 2015
- Recorded: 2013–2015 in Los Angeles, California, Florida, CRC in Chicago, Illinois
- Genres: Hip-hop; neo soul; R&B
- Length: 51:54
- Producer: The Social Experiment

Nico Segal chronology
Donnie Trumpet EP (2013)	Surf (2015)	Intellexual (2019)

Chance the Rapper chronology
Acid Rap (2013)	Surf (2015)	Free (Based Freestyles Mixtape) (2015)

Singles from Surf
- 1. "Sunday Candy" Released: November 25, 2014; 2. "Nothing Came to Me" Released: January 27, 2015; 3. "Wanna Be Cool" Released: July 10, 2015

Surf is the debut studio album by American band The Social Experiment; it was released exclusively on iTunes as a free download on May 28, 2015. The album highlights trumpeter Nico Segal, formerly known as "Donnie Trumpet," and was created by Segal along with his band of collaborators called The Social Experiment—a self-described group of bohemian musicians, consisting of Segal, Chance the Rapper, Peter Cottontale, Greg Landfair Jr., and Nate Fox.

The album was highly anticipated because of Chance's heavy involvement with the group, contributing vocals and some of the arrangements to the album. Upon its release, Surf received positive reviews from music critics, who praised the album's sound, production, lyrics, and guest appearances. Commercially, although the album did not make any major chart, it was downloaded 618,000 times via iTunes in its first week, with over 10 million individual track downloads.

== Release and promotion ==
Surf was surprise-released as an iTunes-exclusive free download shortly before midnight on May 28, 2015, after numerous delays. The album was originally slated to be released by the end of 2014, but the release date was pushed back several times. Preceding the album were the singles "Sunday Candy" and "Nothing Came to Me", neither of which showed any of the various features on the album – since Chance is technically part of The Social Experiment, he is not regarded as a feature.

"Sunday Candy", an ode to Chance's grandmother, featuring vocals by Chance the Rapper and various uncredited singers including Jamila Woods, was followed by "Nothing Came to Me", an instrumental track accompanied by a "silent film" starring Cara Delevingne. The Austin Vesely, Ian Eastwood and Chance the Rapper-directed music video for Sunday Candy was released on YouTube on April 12, 2015. The third and final single, "Wanna Be Cool", was released on July 10, 2015.

== Critical reception ==
Professional ratings
Aggregate scores
Source	Rating
AnyDecentMusic?	8.1/10
Metacritic	86/100
Review scores
Source	Rating
The A.V. Club	A−
Chicago Tribune	3.5/4 stars
Complex	4.5/5 stars
The Guardian	4/5 stars
NME	8/10
Pitchfork	8.3/10
PopMatters	9/10
Rolling Stone	3.5/5 stars
Spin	7/10
Vice (Expert Witness)	A

Surf was met with widespread acclaim from music critics who praised its varied musical elements and aesthetic. At Metacritic, the album received an average score of 86, based on 17 critics. In its first week, Surf was downloaded 618,000 times via iTunes, with over 10 million individual track downloads. Critics highly praised the artful style, lyrics, production, and incorporation of dance, jazz fusion, and neo-soul elements in the music of the album. The album's diverse range of guest artists also drew praise; while no officially credited features were listed in the iTunes track list, Surf contains contributions from J. Cole, BJ The Chicago Kid, Big Sean, KYLE, Jamila Woods, Noname, DRAM, B.o.B, Busta Rhymes, Mike Golden, Janelle Monáe, Quavo and Erykah Badu, among others.

=== Accolades ===
Surf has been ranked as one of the highest-acclaimed albums of 2015, according to review aggregator website Metacritic. Robert Christgau named it the sixth best album of 2015 in his ballot for The Village Voice's annual Pazz & Jop critics poll.

Publication	Accolade	Year	Rank
Pitchfork	The 50 Best Albums of 2015	2015	21
Stereogum	The 50 Best Albums of 2015	2015	16

== Track listing ==
All tracks produced by 'The Social Experiment'. Although no features were listed on iTunes, many artists accompanied Nico Segal and The Social Experiment during the recording of Surf.

No.	Title	Writer(s)	Length
1.	"Miracle"	Amanda Bailey; Chancelor Bennett; Eryn Allen Kane; Jeff Gittleman; Lane Beckstrom; Macie Stewart; Nate Fox; Nico Segal; Peter Cottontale; Raury Tullis; The Stepkids; Stix; Victoria Lee	4:11
2.	"Slip Slide"	Ady Suleiman; Bryan James Sledge; Bobby Ray Simmons Jr.; Trevor Smith Jr.; C. Bennett; Janelle Monáe; J. Gittleman; N. Fox; N. Segal; The O'My's; P. Cottontale; Rob Gueringer; Stix	4:00
3.	"Warm Enough"	C. Bennett; Charles Dumazer; E. Kane; Fatimah Warner; Harry Hunt, Jr.; Jermaine Cole; J. Gittleman; Knox Fortune; N. Fox; N. Segal; P. Cottontale	3:22
4.	"Nothing Came to Me"	J.P. Floyd; N. Segal	3:30
5.	"Wanna Be Cool"	Sean Anderson; Cameron Osteen; Carter Lang; C. Bennett; E. Kane; J. Red; J. Gittleman; Jeremih Felton; Kiara Lainer; Kyle Harvey; N. Fox; N. Segal; P. Cottontale	3:28
6.	"Windows"	B. Sledge; R. Tullis; C. Bennett; C. Dumazer; E. Kane; Francis Farewell Starlite; J. Red; Jamila Woods; L. Beckstrom; Liam Cunningham; M. Stewart; Matt Carrol; N. Fox; N. Segal; P. Cottontale; Vivian McConnell	3:57
7.	"Caretaker"	Shelley Massenburg-Smith; P. Cottontale	1:35
8.	"Just Wait"	C. Osteen; C. Lang; C. Bennett; Dustin Green; F. Starlite; J. Floyd; N. Fox; N. Segal; P. Cottontale	3:47
9.	"Familiar"	C. Bennett; D. Green; Ilan Kidron; J. Red; J. Floyd; Louis Johnson, Jr.; N. Fox; N. Segal; P. Cottontale; Quavious Marshall; Sir the Baptist	3:54
10.	"SmthnthtIwnt"	Chuck Ellis; J. Gittleman; Jenna Jimenez; J. Floyd; Mitchell Owens; N. Fox; N. Segal; P. Cottontale; Tahj Chandler	1:51
11.	"Go"	A. Bailey; E. Kane; F. Starlite; J. Gittleman; Mike Golden; Jesse Boykins III; Joey Purp; L. Beckstrom; Lili K.; M. Stewart; N. Fox; N. Segal; P. Cottontale	4:22
12.	"Questions"	D. Green; Jamila Woods; N. Fox; N. Segal	1:55
13.	"Something Came to Me"	F. Starlite; N. Fox; N. Segal; P. Cottontale	3:11
14.	"Rememory"	A. Suleiman; C. Bennett; D. Green; Erykah Badu; N. Fox; N. Segal; P. Cottontale	2:34
15.	"Sunday Candy"	C. Bennett; E. Kane; Franco Davis; J. Red; J. Woods; J. Floyd; M. Stewart; N. Fox; N. Segal; Patrick Paige; P. Cottontale; Sima Cunningham; Stix	3:46
16.	"Pass the Vibes"	Eric Butler; J. Floyd; N. Fox; N. Segal; Thaddeus Tukes	2:31
Total length:			51:54

=== Notes ===
- "Slip Slide" contains uncredited vocals from B.o.B, BJ the Chicago Kid, Busta Rhymes, Janelle Monáe and Ady Suleiman.
- "Warm Enough" contains uncredited vocals from J. Cole and Noname.
- "Wanna Be Cool" contains uncredited vocals from Big Sean, Jeremih and Kyle.
- "Windows" contains uncredited vocals from BJ the Chicago Kid and Raury.
- "Caretaker" contains uncredited vocals from DRAM
- "Familiar" contains uncredited vocals from King L and Quavo.
- "SmthnthtIwnt" contains uncredited vocals from Saba.
- "Go" contains uncredited vocals from Mike Golden, Jesse Boykins III and Joey Purp.
- "Questions" contains uncredited vocals from Jamila Woods.
- "Rememory" contains uncredited vocals from Erykah Badu and Ady Suleiman.
- "Sunday Candy" contains uncredited vocals from Jamila Woods.
- "Pass the Vibes" contains uncredited vocals from Eric Butler.
