= Nico Segal =

American trumpeter and record producer (born 1993)

- Also known as: Donnie Trumpet (2006–2016)
- Born: June 25, 1993 (age 32); Chicago, Illinois, U.S.
- Genres: Hip-hop; jazz; blues; rock; soul
- Occupations: Trumpeter, record producer
- Instrument: Trumpet
- Years active: 2009–present
- Member of: Savemoney; The Social Experiment
- Formerly of: Kids These Days
- Website: http://nicosegal.com

Nico Segal (born June 25, 1993), formerly known by his stage name Donnie Trumpet, is an American trumpeter and record producer from Chicago, Illinois. He is part of the hip-hop collective Savemoney with Chance the Rapper and Vic Mensa, among others. He was a member of the band Kids These Days, which broke up in 2013, and currently performs in the band the Social Experiment.

== Musical career ==
=== 2009-2013: Kids These Days ===
In 2009, the band Kids These Days was formed with Nico Segal, Vic Mensa, Liam Cunningham, Lane Beckstrom, Greg Landfair, Macie Stewart, J. P. Floyd, and Rajiv Halim. On June 28, 2011, they released an extended play titled Hard Times EP and a full length mixtape, Traphouse Rock, on October 30, 2012. On March 26, Nico Segal released his first mixtape Illasoul: Shades of Blue. In May 2013, the band broke up and Nico Segal released his solo extended play, Donnie Trumpet EP on June 28, 2013.

=== 2014-present: the Social Experiment ===
At the end of 2013 Segal performed with Chance the Rapper and the Social Experiment along with Nate Fox, Greg Landfair Jr. and Peter Cottontale. He released his debut album with the band Surf on May 28, 2015. The album was released exclusively on iTunes as a free download and was downloaded over 618,000 times in its first week.

Segal contributed to Earth, a live album by Neil Young and Promise of the Real, released on June 17, 2016.

On November 9, 2016, after Republican nominee Donald Trump won the U.S Presidential election, Segal dropped the nickname Donnie Trumpet.

== Discography ==
=== Studio albums ===
- Surf (2015) (with the Social Experiment)
- Exchange (2017) (with The JuJu Exchange)
- Intellexual (2019) (with Nate Fox)
- JazzRx (2023) (with The Juju Exchange)
- Tell The Ghost Welcome Home (2023)

=== Extended plays ===
- Hard Times EP (2011) (with Kids These Days)
- Donnie Trumpet EP (2013)
- The Eternal Boombox EP (2020) (with The JuJu Exchange)

=== Mixtapes ===
- Illasoul: Shades of Blue (2012)
- Traphouse Rock (2012) (with Kids These Days)
