= Cam O'bi =

Record producer from Chicago, Illinois

- Born: Cameron Osteen; Las Vegas, Nevada. U.S.
- Genres: Hip hop; R&B; neo soul; jazz-funk
- Occupations: Record producer; singer-songwriter; audio engineer

Cameron Osteen, better known by his stage name Cam O'bi, is an American record producer, singer-songwriter and audio engineer. He has produced for Chance the Rapper, Vic Mensa, Mick Jenkins, Noname, J. Cole, Bas, Saba, and Isaiah Rashad. His upcoming debut album is titled Grown Ass Kid.

== Musical career ==
=== 2012–17: Career beginnings ===
Osteen began his music career as part of J.U.S.T.I.C.E. League, a production team based in Tampa, Florida, but is best known for his solo production and songwriting work with Chicago artists Chance the Rapper, Vic Mensa, Mick Jenkins, Noname, and Saba. In 2015, he went on tour with J. Cole as a producer in the Forest Hills Drive Tour, where he began working more with Dreamville artists including Bas and Lute. Osteen was also part of the team working on Grammy Award-winning album Coloring Book in 2017, which was the first-ever streaming-only album to win a Grammy. In 2017, he was included in the XXL best hip-hop producers list.

=== 2018–present: Solo career ===
January 2018 saw the launch of Osteen as an artist in his own right, with the single "TenderHeaded" which features Smino. The song received positive feedback from music journalists. The song also made the BBC Radio 1 playlists in the UK. His debut album Grown Ass Kid has no release date, but was expected to be released in 2018. The album will feature the single "Grown Ass Kid", a co-production between Chance the Rapper and Osteen. It was initially intended for Chance's Coloring Book album in 2017 but didn't make the final cut.

== Discography ==
=== Studio albums ===
- Grown Ass Kid (TBA)

== Production discography ==
=== 2013 ===
Chance the Rapper – Acid Rap

- 01. "Good Ass Intro" (featuring BJ the Chicago Kid, Lili K., Kiara Lanier, Peter Cottontale, Will of the O'mys and JP of Kids These Days)
- 03. "Cocoa Butter Kisses" (featuring Vic Mensa and Twista)
- 13. "Everything's Good (Good Ass Outro)"

Vic Mensa – Innanetape

- 01. "Welcome to INNANET"
- 02. "Orange Soda"
- 09. "Hollywood LA" (featuring Lili K.)
- 10. "Holy Holy" (featuring Ab-Soul and BJ the Chicago Kid)

Lil Wayne – Dedication 5

- 07. "You Song" (featuring Chance the Rapper)

=== 2014 ===
Mick Jenkins – The Waters

- 05. "Comfortable" (featuring Noname)

=== 2015 ===
Rejjie Snow

- 00. "All Around the World”

EarthGang – Strays With Rabies

- 14. "Simba”

=== 2016 ===
Bas – Too High to Riot

- 01. "Too High to Riot"

Domo Genesis – Genesis

- 03. "Wanderer" (featuring Tay Walker)
- 08. "Faded in the Moment" (featuring Cam O'bi)

Twenty88 – Twenty88

- 01. "Déjà Vu"
- 03. "On the Way"

Towkio – .Wav Theory

- 04. "Free Your Mind" (featuring Donnie Trumpet)

Chance the Rapper – Coloring Book

- 13. "Blessings (Reprise)" (featuring Ty Dolla Sign, Raury, BJ the Chicago Kidand Anderson Paak)

Noname – Telefone

- 01. "Yesterday"
- 02. "Sunny Duet" (with theMIND)
- 03. "Diddy Bop" (featuring Raury and Cam O'bi)
- 05. "Reality Check" (featuring Eryn Allen Kane and Akenya)
- 09. "Bye Bye Baby"
- 10. "Shadow Man" (featuring Saba, Smino and Phoelix)

Saba – Bucket List Project

- 03. "GPS" (featuring Twista)
- 04. "Church (Liquor Store)" (featuring Noname)

Isaiah Rashad – The Sun's Tirade

- 03. "Free Lunch"

Mick Jenkins – The Healing Component

- 14. "Angles" (featuring Noname and Xavier Omar)

=== 2017 ===
J. Cole

- 00. "High for Hours"

SZA – CTRL

- 03. "Doves in the Wind" (featuring Kendrick Lamar)

Lute – West1996 pt. 2

- 07. "Ford's Prayer" (featuring Cam O'bi)
- 09. "Premonition" (featuring EarthGang & Cam O'bi)
  Rejjie Snow- The Moon & You

Purple Tuesday (featuring Jesse Boykins lll & Joey Bada$$)

=== 2018 ===
Rejjie S- Dear Annie

- 05. "Pink Lemonade" (featuring Cam O'bi)
- 14. "The Rain" (featuring Krondon & Cam O'bi)

=== 2019 ===
Revenge of the Dreamers III

- 17. "PTSD" (with Omen featuring Mereba, Deante' Hitchcock and St. Beauty)

Cam O’bi – Grown Ass Kid

- "Grown Ass Kid" (featuring Chance the Rapper, Mick Jenkins & Alex Wiley)
- "Living Single" (featuring Big Sean, Chance The Rapper & Jeremih)
- "TenderHead" (featuring Smino)

== Personal life ==
Osteen was raised in the evangelical denomination, but fell out of favor with Christianity at a young age. After his marriage he had a renewed interest in religion, and in the Easter vigil of 2026 he converted to Catholicism.
