= Telefone (mixtape) =

Mixtape by Noname
- Released: July 31, 2016
- Recorded: 2016
- Genres: Hip hop; jazz rap; conscious hip hop; neo soul
- Length: 33:13
- Producers: Cam O'bi (also exec.); Phoelix (also exec.); Saba; Monte Booker

Noname chronology
Telefone (2016)	Room 25 (2018)

Telefone is the debut mixtape by American rapper Noname. Originally announced in 2012, the mixtape faced numerous delays and was finally released four years later on July 31, 2016, as a free digital download. It features guest appearances from Saba, Ravyn Lenae, Raury, and Smino among others.

The mixtape was met with universal acclaim. Pitchfork ranked opening track "Yesterday" as the 37th best track of 2016.

== Background ==
Noname, then performing under the stage name Noname Gypsy, announced to fans in 2012 that her debut project would be titled Telefone. Noname first gained attention through her guest feature on the song "Lost" by Chance the Rapper from his second mixtape Acid Rap (2013). In July 2013, Hypebeast reported that Noname's debut mixtape Telefone was "due out soon" and Fact reported in August 2013 that the mixtape was "set to drop any day now". In January 2014, Noname stated that her first project Telefone would be either an extended play or mixtape, depending on if she could afford to pay for mixing.

However, 2014 and most of 2015 passed with no new information on Telefone. Noname made reference to her fans anxiously awaiting the frequently-delayed project on Mick Jenkins' "Comfortable" from the mixtape The Waters, rapping "Noname on the comeup, Telefone never coming out, what's the hold up? / Where you been at? Where the print at?" Noname was nicknamed the "Jay Electronica of Chicago" for managing to stay relevant despite only releasing music sporadically.

On January 17, 2016, Noname released the song "All I Need" onto SoundCloud, featuring Xavier Omär (originally released under his previous stage name SPZRKT). On April 4, 2016, Noname shared the song "Freedom Interlude", produced by Saba and Phoelix. In June 2016, Noname moved to Los Angeles to finalize Telefone with Saba, Phoelix, and Cam O'bi. The group used two Airbnb rentals to house makeshift studios. That same month, Noname shared on Twitter that Telefone would be released in late July and feature twelve tracks.

Noname is scheduled to embark on a North American tour in 2026 in support of the mixtape's tenth anniversary.

== Artwork and title ==
In a June 2015 interview, Noname was asked about the title Telefone. She responded:

I named it Telefone because I like the idea of what it means to be on the phone with someone for the very first time and all its little intricate idiosyncrasies. From the awkwardness to the laughter or various intimate conversations you can have over the phone, I want my project to be very conversational. I want people to feel like they’re on the phone with me, getting to know me better than a text message or a tweet.

The artwork for Telefone was painted by Nikko Washington, the art director for Chicago collective SaveMoney. Washington had previously done the cover art for Noname's tracks "All I Need" and "Freedom Interlude", but had never hand-painted a cover before. Noname asked Washington to make the cover depict the balancing act of life and death. Washington kept with this request, and painted a child as "a reflection of a young African-American child in this world right now. I tried to make her represent Noname, but not be her."

== Release and reception ==
Professional ratings
Aggregate scores
Source	Rating
AnyDecentMusic?	7.7/10
Metacritic	84/100
Review scores
Source	Rating
The 405	7.5/10
The A.V. Club	A−
Consequence of Sound	B+
DIY	4/5 stars
Flood Magazine	8/10
The Guardian	4/5 stars
Pitchfork	8.0/10
Rolling Stone	3.5/5 stars

Telefone was released to rave reviews from fans and critics. The Guardian called it "nostalgic, intricate coming-of-age hip-hop." Pitchfork called it a "stunning debut" and gave the song "Diddy Bop" their "Best New Track" honor, with Jayson Greene writing:

"Diddy Bop" is luxurious and easy and warm, a reminiscence about good times, or better ones. Her voice is in a playful and confident middle range between forestalling, singing, and slam poetry, and her lyrics carve out enough details to fill the song with an entire imagined cast of characters—jealous boyfriends griping at girls in love with Raz-B from B2K; kids nabbing twenties from their mom's purse..."

Rolling Stone called the mixtape "some of 2016's most thought-provoking hip-hop." Stereogum wrote that on Noname possessed "a potency and urgency in her complicated, spoken word-esque cadences and subdued delivery that escapes many of her more animated peers." Consequence of Sound concluded that "the louder her music is played, the brighter her cadence glows, giving her lyrics a type of 3D craft that makes Telefone a diary of lessons too relevant to keep to yourself."

"Diddy Bop" featuring Raury and Cam O'bi was Beats 1's World Record on August 8, 2016.

=== Accolades ===
Publication	Accolade	Year	Rank	Ref.
Consequence of Sound	Top 50 Albums of 2016	2016	36	
Noisey	The 100 Best Albums of 2016	2016	91	
Pitchfork	The 50 Best Albums of 2016	2016	27	
Stereogum	The 50 Best Albums of 2016	2016	28	
The Skinny	Top 50 Albums of 2016	2016	29	

== Track listing ==
All tracks are written by Fatimah Warner. Additional writing on track 10 by theMIND.

No.	Title	Producer(s)	Length
1.	"Yesterday"	Cam O'bi; Phoelix; Saba	3:09
2.	"Sunny Duet" (with theMIND)	Cam O'bi; Monte Booker	2:42
3.	"Diddy Bop" (featuring Raury and Cam O'bi)	Phoelix; Cam O'bi	3:28
4.	"All I Need" (featuring Xavier Omär)	Saba; Phoelix; THEMpeople	4:00
5.	"Reality Check" (featuring Eryn Allen Kane and Akenya)	Cam O'bi; Phoelix^{[a]}	3:03
6.	"Freedom Interlude"	Saba; Phoelix	3:19
7.	"Casket Pretty"	Saba; Phoelix	1:50
8.	"Forever" (featuring Ravyn Lenae and Joseph Chilliams)	Saba; Phoelix	3:38
9.	"Bye Bye Baby"	Cam O'bi; Phoelix	2:49
10.	"Shadow Man" (featuring Saba, Smino and Phoelix)	Cam O'bi; Phoelix^{[a]}	5:11
Total length:			33:13

Notes

- ^{^[a]} signifies an additional producer
- "All I Need" contains uncredited vocals by Phoelix and L-Boog

== Personnel ==
Credits adapted from Noname's SoundCloud.

- Noname – lead vocals, songwriting (all tracks)
- Cam O'bi – executive producer, additional vocals (track 10)
- Phoelix – executive producer, additional vocals (tracks 1–2)
- Akenya – additional vocals (track 1)
- Cameron Boswell – audio engineering for Eryn Allen Kane (track 5)
- Nick Breton – audio recording (all tracks)
- Elton "L10mixedit" Chueng – mixing, mastering (all tracks)
- Ralph Gene – drums (track 10)
- Saba – additional songwriting (track 10)
- Ron Spraggins – audio engineering for Akenya (track 5)
- theMIND – additional vocals (tracks 1, 10), additional lyrics (track 10)
- Nikko Washington – artwork
