= Fred Warmsley =

American electronic musician

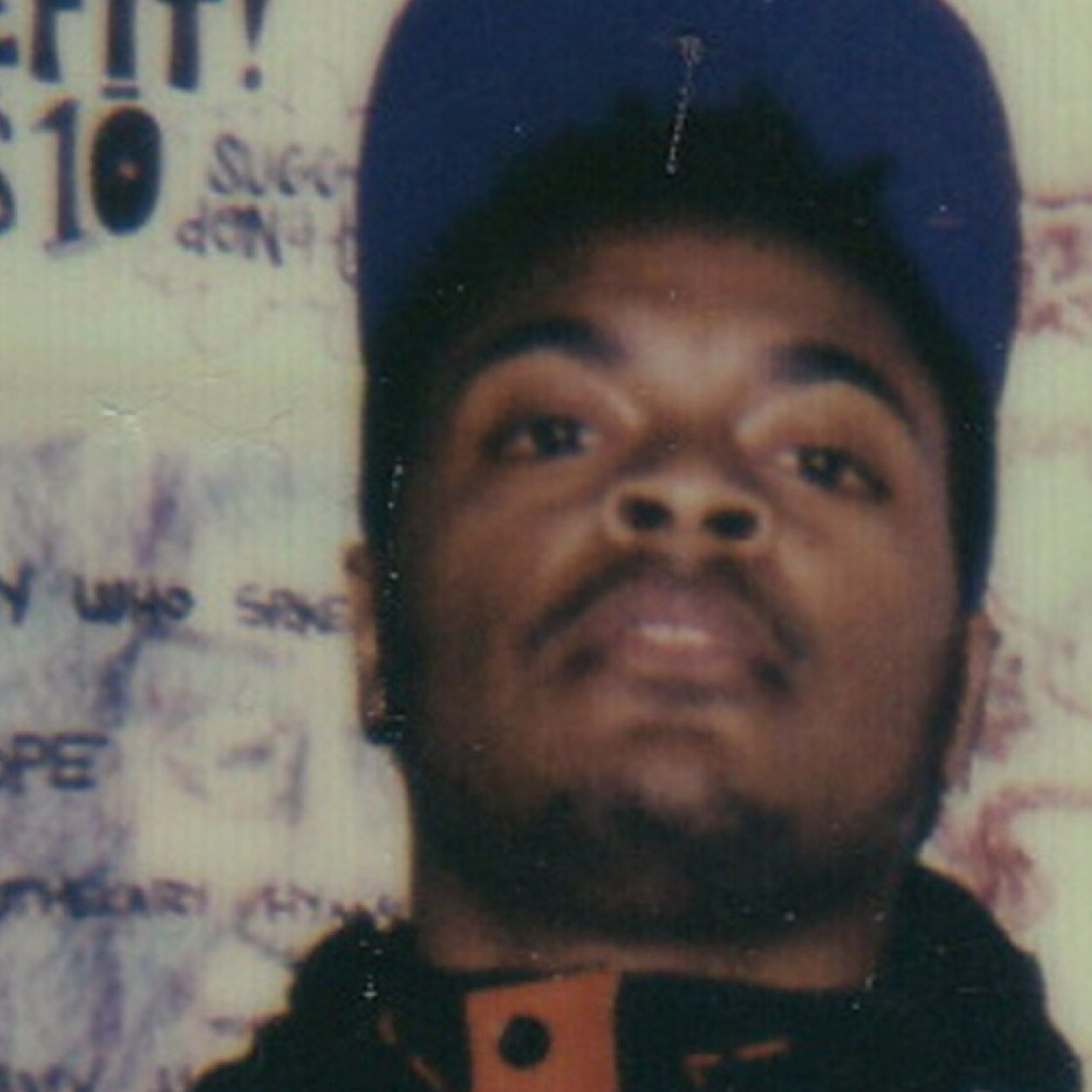
- Warmsley in 2011

Background information
- Also known as: Lee Bannon; ¬ b; Dedekind Cut
- Born: Fred Welton Warmsley III; September 22, 1987 (age 38)
- Origin: Sacramento, California, U.S.
- Genres: Experimental; electronic; ambient
- Occupations: Record producer; DJ
- Instruments: Computer; drum machine; synthesizer
- Years active: 2008–present

Fred Welton Warmsley III (born September 22, 1987) is an American electronic musician from Sacramento, California. Initially known for his work with the East Coast hip hop collective Pro Era, he has since produced experimental electronic music. He released eight extended plays and two albums between 2013 and 2018, including Alternate/Endings (2013) and its follow-up, $uccessor (2016).

== Career ==
=== 2010–2012: Early career and work with Pro Era ===
Warmsley, then known as Lee Bannon, first began to receive attention after self-releasing beat tapes between 2010 and 2012, eventually leading to collaborations with California rappers Souls of Mischief, Hieroglyphics and fellow producer The Alchemist. Soon after, Warmsley was introduced to Joey Bada$$ and the rest of Pro Era through a mutual friend. Bannon signed on as Pro Era's touring DJ in 2012 and doing production for Joey Badas$$' third mixtape Summer Knights. He appeared alongside Joey Bada$$ and The Roots when they performed "Waves" live on Late Night with Jimmy Fallon on November 2, 2012.

=== 2013–2015: Alternate/Endings, Pattern of Excel and name change ===
After his time with Pro Era, Warmsley began to explore a more experimental sound as a solo artist. In June 2013, he self-released "NW/WB", which showcased strong jungle and drum and bass influences and garnered a significant amount of press, including Spin, who included Bannon on their list of the 5 Best New Artists for July 2013. The attention drew the interest of British label Ninja Tune, which signed Bannon in October 2013. His debut long play, entitled Alternate/Endings, was released on January 9, 2014, to critical acclaim. Rolling Stone placed Alternate/Endings at number 15 of its 20 Best Electronic and Dance Albums of 2014.

On April 27, 2015, Warmsley announced his second long play, Pattern of Excel, along with its first single "Artificial Stasis". It was also announced that the album would consist almost completely of ambient music. On May 26, 2015, Warmsley announced via a hand-written note posted on his Instagram page that he would be changing his moniker from Lee Bannon to "¬ b" (meaning "not Bannon"). He wrote that Pattern of Excel would be his final release as Lee Bannon, adding that he feels the name had "reached its limits" and that "the future can no longer exist in the same realm with music I created when I was 17, fickle and still developing." The following day, he released the track "disneμ girls" from Pattern of Excel, which was itself released on July 8, 2015.

=== 2015–present: Second name change and $uccessor ===
On September 9, 2015, Warmsley released an extended play titled tHot eNhançeR under the new moniker "Dedekind Cut". He followed that up with a collaborative project with the musician Rabit titled R&D on January 19, 2016. On March 23, 2016 American Zen was released physically by Hospital Productions and digitally by Ninja Tune. In a review, Resident Advisor described American Zen as "new age" and having "chilling cinematic sound design". On September 1, 2016, it was announced that Warmsley would be releasing his debut studio album as Dedekind Cut, titled $uccessor, on November 11, 2016.

== Discography ==
=== As Lee Bannon ===
Studio albums

- Alternate/Endings (2013)
- Pattern of Excel (2015)

=== As Dedekind Cut ===
Studio albums

- $uccessor (2016)
- Tahoe (2018)

Extended plays

- LAST (2016)
- American Zen (2016)
- The Expanding Domain (2017)

=== Production ===
The following is a list of albums in which Warmsley has produced as either producer or co-producer, showing year released, performing artists and album name.

Year	Artist(s)	Album
As Lee Bannon
2008	Big Shug	Other Side of the Game
2008	Sha Stimuli	Love Jones
2009	The Jacka	Tear Gas
2009	Trife Diesel	Better Late Than Never
2010	Inspectah Deck	Manifesto
2010	Lee Bannon	The Big Toy Box
2010	Lee Bannon	The Big Toy Box 2
2010	Reks	In Between the Lines
2010	Willie the Kid, Lee Bannon	Never a Dull Moment
2011	DJ Deadeye	Substance Abuse
2011	Roc C	Stoned Genius
2011	S.T.R.E.E.T.	S.T.R.E.E.T. (Speakin' Thru Real Experience Every Time)
2012	Big Shug	I.M. 4-Eva
2012	Lee Bannon	Caligula Theme Music
2012	Lee Bannon	Fantastic Plastic
2012	Pro Era	PEEP: The aPROcalypse
2012	Ron Artiste'	R.I.D.S. (Riot in Da Stands)
2012	Smoke DZA	K.O.N.Y.
2012	Strong Arm Steady	Members Only
2012	Tribe of Levi	Follow My Lead
2013	CJ Fly	Thee Way Eye See It
2013	Fat Trel	SDMG
2013	Joey Bada$$	Summer Knights
2013	Joey Bada$$	Summer Knights EP
2013	Lee Bannon	PLACE/CRUSHER
2013	Reks	Revolution Cocktail
2013	Scallops Hotel	Poplar Grove (or How to Rap with a Hammer)
2014	Lee Bannon	Alternate/Endings
2014	Lee Bannon	Caligula Theme Music 2.7.5
2014	Lee Bannon	Joey Bada$$/Pro Era Instrumentals, Vol. 1
2014	Lee Bannon	Never/Mind/The/Darkness/Of/It
2014	R.F.C.	The Outsiders
2014	Smoke DZA	Dream.ZONE.Achieve
2015	Joey Bada$$	B4.DA.$$
2015	Lee Bannon	Cope
2015	Lee Bannon	Pattern of Excel
2015	Mick Jenkins	Wave[s]
2015	Wiki	Lil Me
As Dedekind Cut
2015	Dedekind Cut	tHot eNhançeR
2016	Dedekind Cut	American Zen
2016	Dedekind Cut	LAST
2016	Dedekind Cut	$uccessor
2016	Rabit, Dedekind Cut	R&D
2017	Dedekind Cut	The Expanding Domain
