= The Healing Component =

Studio album by Mick Jenkins
- Released: September 23, 2016
- Recorded: 2014–2016
- Genre: Hip-hop
- Length: 62:18
- Label: Cinematic
- Producers: Rascal; THEMpeople; Sango; Atu; Dee Lilly; BadBadNotGood; Kaytranada; IAMNOBODI; Monte Booker; Cam O'bi; Dpat

Mick Jenkins chronology
Waves (2015)	The Healing Component (2016)	Pieces of a Man (2018)

Singles from The Healing Component
- 1. "Spread Love" Released: August 17, 2016; 2. "Drowning" Released: August 25, 2016

The Healing Component is the debut studio album by American rapper Mick Jenkins. It was released on September 23, 2016, by Cinematic Music Group.

== Background ==
The album's production came from multiple contributors such as Rascal, THEMpeople, Sango, Atu, Dee Lilly, BadBadNotGood, Kaytranada, IAMNOBODI, Monte Booker, Cam O'bi and Dpat. The album features guest appearances, which includes his longtime contributors The Mind and Noname, as well as BadBadNotGood, Ravyn Lenae, J-Stock, Xavier Omar and Michael Anthony.

== Singles ==
On August 17, 2016, Mick Jenkins released "Spread Love" as the album's lead single. On August 25, 2016, he released the album's second single, "Drowning", accompanied by a music video.

== Critical reception ==
Professional ratings
Aggregate scores
Source	Rating
Metacritic	79/100
Review scores
Source	Rating
Consequence of Sound	B+
Exclaim!	8/10 stars
HipHopDX	3.8/5 stars
Now Magazine	3/5 stars
Pitchfork	7.6/10

The Healing Component received generally positive reviews from music critics upon release. On Metacritic, the album has a weighted average score of 79 out of 100, based on seven critics, indicating "generally favorable reviews".

== Track listing ==
No.	Title	Producer(s)	Length
1.	"The Healing Component"	Rascal; THEMpeople	5:02
2.	"Spread Love"	Sango	3:53
3.	"Daniel's Bloom"	Sango; Atu	3:40
4.	"Strange Love"	THEMpeople; Dee Lilly	6:08
5.	"This Type Love?"		2:24
6.	"Drowning" (featuring BadBadNotGood)	BadBadNotGood	6:00
7.	"As Seen in Bethsaida" (featuring theMIND)	THEMpeople	2:47
8.	"Communicate" (featuring Ravyn Lenae)	Kaytranada	3:57
9.	"Plugged"	IAMNOBODI	3:55
10.	"1000 Xans" (featuring theMIND)	Kaytranada	3:15
11.	"Prosperity" (featuring theMIND)	THEMpeople	4:44
12.	"Fall Through"	Rascal; THEMpeople	3:53
13.	"Love, Robert Horry" (featuring J-Stock)	THEMpeople	3:36
14.	"Angles" (featuring Noname and Xavier Omar)	Monte Booker; THEMpeople; Cam O'bi	4:23
15.	"Fucked Up Outro" (featuring Michael Anthony)	Dpat	4:51
Total length:			62:18

== Charts ==
Chart (2016)	Peak position
Belgian Albums (Ultratop Flanders)	156
French Albums (SNEP)	101
New Zealand Heatseekers Albums (RMNZ)	3
US Billboard 200	110
US Top R&B/Hip-Hop Albums (Billboard)	9
US Top Rap Albums (Billboard)	6
