= Thelonious Martin =

American musical artist

- Also known as: King Thelonious
- Born: Malcolm Martin; September 19, 1992 (age 34); Chicago, Illinois, United States
- Origin: New Jersey, United States
- Genre: Hip-hop
- Instruments: Percussion; synthesizer; keyboards; Sampler
- Years active: 2009–present
- Member of: Savemoney

Malcolm Martin (born September 19, 1992), professionally known as Thelonious Martin or King Thelonious is an American hip-hop record producer from Chicago, Illinois. He is a member of the Chicago collective Savemoney.

== Life and career ==
Malcolm Martin was born on September 19, 1992, in Chicago, Illinois. However, shortly afterwards, he and his mother moved to New Jersey.

Martin states his love for music started when he was 14 after watching the late night network Adult Swim and hearing a song by late hip-hop producer J Dilla. Martin later became a fan of other Underground hip-hop producers, most notably Madlib. After graduating from Montclair High School, Martin moved back to Chicago, joining forces with SAVEMONEY, led by Vic Mensa. Martin began producing for members of the group throughout 2011 and in 2012, he produced the tracks "Ave." and "If Heaven is a Ghetto" for Odd Future's Hodgy Beats's EP Untitled. Later that year, he appeared on the Pro Era mixtape PEEP: The Aprocalypse, producing the song "K.I.N.G.S." performed by Joey Badass and Capital STEEZ.

Later that year, Martin collaborated with the Odd Future group MellowHigh for their single "Go" released on April 20. In 2013, he began to work with rapper Curren$y on his mixtape New Jet City. Months after the mixtape release, Martin began to work with Action Bronson and produced two songs on New Jersey rapper Da$h's critically acclaimed mixtape V.I.C.E.S.. Later that year, he collaborated with rapper Retch for his mixtape Polo Sporting Goods, entirely produced by Martin.

In 2014, Martin produced half of Curren$y's mixtape The Drive In Theatre. He later produced "Ghost of Dipset" for New York rapper Smoke DZA for his album Dream.ZONE.Achieve. Later that year, Martin released the song "Her", featuring Mac Miller. The song was released as a promotional single for his upcoming album. He later released the song "Atlantis" featuring Curren$y and Odd Future's Domo Genesis. Along with the song, he released the album title, artwork, and track list. On December 2, 2014, he released his debut album Wünderkid, entirely produced by himself and featured Curren$y, Domo Genesis, Retch, Mac Miller, Ab-Soul, Smoke DZA, and more. Martin later had his song "September" featured on Adult Swim. He also produced the song "Back Home" for A$AP Rocky's sophomore album At.Long.Last.A$AP.

In 2015, Martin had collaborated with Rhode Island musician and designer Theo Martins. The two began collaborating after confusion over similarities between their names became incessant. "Show Me Around", which debuted on Okayplayer was warmly received and the two began work on a full-length. "Bad Tendencies" premiered on The Fader on September 28, 2016, and the two announced a collaborative EP. Theo Martins cites Odd Future member Anwar Carrots as the fuel behind collaborating with Martin.

== Influences ==
Martin has stated that he is influenced by Madlib, MF Doom, J Dilla, Flying Lotus, Alchemist, Pete Rock, and Just Blaze.

== Discography ==
=== Studio albums ===
- Wünderkid (2014)
- Late Night Programming (2016)

=== Collaborative albums ===
- Molotov (with Saga) (2017)
- TM (with Theo Martins) (2017)
- As It Is in Heaven (with Jabee) (2018)
- Deliver Us from Evil (with Jabee) (2018)
- Thy Will Be Done (with Jabee) (2019)
- 5-Series (with Jacob Rochester) (2020)
- Patchworks (with Jacob Rochester) (2021)
- 2409 West Slauson (with Radamiz) (2023)
- Champagne Seats (with Joey Purp) (2025)

== Production discography ==
=== 2012 ===
==== Hodgy Beats – untitled ====
- 06. "Ave."
- 08. "If Heaven Is a Ghetto"

==== Skyzoo – Theo vs. JJ (Dreams vs. Reality) ====
- 03. "Fulfillment"
- 04. "Ever Loyal"

==== Freeway – Freedom of Speech ====
- 10. "Let You Know"

==== Curren$y – Priest Andretti ====
- 08. "Talk My Shit"

==== Pro Era – PEEP: The aPROcalypse ====
- 13. "K.I.N.G.S." (performed by Joey Bada$$ and Capital STEEZ)

==== Curren$y - 3 Piece Set / A Closed Session ====
- 01. "Pick N Roll" (featuring Young Roddy)
- 02. "Can't Get Out" (featuring Young Roddy)
- 03. "Yella Cab"

=== 2013 ===
==== Joey Bada$$ ====
- "Wendy-n-Becky" (featuring Chance the Rapper)

==== Le$ – E36 ====
- 11. "Autobahn" (featuring Smoke DZA)

==== Alex Wiley – Club Wiley ====
- 14. "Icky Woods" (featuring Action Bronson)

==== Dash – V.I.C.E.S ====
- 08. "Brighton Beach"
- 11. "22 Tabs"

==== Showyousuck – One Man Pizza Party 4: Slice After Death ====
- 04. "Flip Phone"

==== World's Fair – Bastards of the Party ====
- 03. "Heathrow" (performed by Children of the Night)

==== Curren$y & Young Roddy – Bales ====
- 03. "Weather Channel"
- 10. "Walkie Talkies"

==== RetcH - Polo Sporting Goods ====
- 01. Graceful Jewelry Removal
- 02. Marmalade Sky
- 03. Burgundy Windbreaker
- 04. Odd Sweaters 1992
- 05. Pimp Sport
- 06. Short $ermons (featuring Ab-Soul)
- 07. Special Jim
- 08. 850 Music (Morimoto Drug Transactions) (featuring Action Bronson)
- 09. Since My Dog Died
- 10. Paul Allen's Business Card (featuring Sulaiman)
- 11. Blue Fin Tuna (featuring Da$H)

==== Kool A.D. – Not O.K. ====
- 07. "PLVYVHVT3" (featuring Jabee)

=== 2014 ===
==== Curren$y - The Drive In Theatre ====
- 01. "Introduction"
- 04. "Vintage Vineyard"
- 05. "Stolen"
- 07. "E.T." (featuring B-Real)
- 08. "Grew Up in This" (featuring Young Roddy & Freddie Gibbs)
- 09. "M.P.R."
- 12. "Hi Top Whites"

==== Smoke DZA – Dream. Zone. Achieve ====
- 03. "Ghost of Dipset" (featuring Cam'ron)

==== Curren$y - Saturday Night Car Tunes ====
- 03. "House Shoes"

==== Thelonious Martin - Wunderkid ====
- 01. "Marvin"
- 02. "Atlantis" (featuring Curren$y & Domo Genesis)
- 03. "September"
- 04. "Corners Of Your Mind" (featuring KSRA & Nylo)
- 05. "Purps Interlude" (featuring Joey Purp)
- 06. "Ode To Madlib"
- 07. "Tree Of Life (Reprise)"
- 08. "The Home Team" (featuring Saint Ross & Topaz Jones)
- 09. "Malcolm Interlude" (featuring Mac Miller)
- 10. "All It Takes" (featuring Smoke DZA)
- 11. "Tonight/Dreaming/Wake Up"
- 12. "Jazzercise" (featuring Michael Christmas)
- 13. "Wrong Or Right"
- 14. "BadGuyGoodGuy" (featuring Ab-Soul & Retch)
- 15. "Purp Outro" (featuring Joey Purp)

=== 2015 ===
==== ASAP Rocky – At. Long. Last. ASAP ====
- 18. "Back Home" (featuring Mos Def, A-Cyde & ASAP Yams)

==== Skyzoo – Music for My Friends ====
- 06. "See a Key (Ki)" (featuring Jadakiss)
- 10. "Women Who Can Cook"

==== RetcH – Finesse the World ====
- 07. "Bad Luck"
- 10. "Dirty Ginger Ale"

==== Da$H - 17 More Minutes ====
- 08. "RUPHUS"

==== Michael Christmas - What A Weird Day ====
- 09. "I Wrote A Poem" (featuring NJOMZA)
- 16. "Just Blaze"

=== 2016 ===
==== Joey Purp - iiiDrops ====
- 06. "Cornerstone" (featuring Saba & theMIND)
- 08. "Godbody"
- 10. "Winners Circle" (featuring Vic Mensa)

==== Hannibal King – Don't Die ====
- 05. "88"

==== Hodgy Beats – Dukkha ====
- 01. "Anime"

==== Xavier Omär - The Everlasting Wave ====
- 02. "Grown Woman"
- 05. "Do Not Disturb" (co-produced with Carter Lang, Peter CottonTale, & Will Miller)

==== Curren$y - Andretti 10/30 ====
- 02. "Lifers"

=== 2017 ===
==== Slayter - REAL NIGGAS GET LONLEY ====
- 10. "DRUGS 2 THE PARTY" (co-produced with Stelios Phil & Smoko Ono)

==== Sha Hef - Out The Mud ====
- 15. "Before The Pen"

==== Al.divino - DUMP GAWD: DIVINO EDITION ====
- 02. "CEMENT SHOES" (featuring Tha God Fahim)

==== G Herbo - Humble Beast ====
- 01. "Street" (co-produced with Isaac Burns)

==== IDK - IWASVERYBAD ====
- 11. "Black Sheep, White Dove" (co-produced with ByLoFi)

=== 2018 ===
==== G Herbo - Humble Beast (Deluxe Edition) ====
- 24. "Shook"

==== Topaz Jones - Nectar / Pleasure Pain Passion - Single ====
- 02. "Pleasure Pain Passion" (co-produced with Topaz Jones)

==== Colez - Poppa EP ====
- 02. "Cool" (featuring Mick Jenkins & Alex Wiley) (co-produced with Carter Lang)

==== Michael Christmas - Role Model ====
- 09. "Ball" (co-produced with Niko the Great)
- 13. "Growing Up"

==== Joey Purp - Quarterthing ====
- 01. "24k Gold / Sanctified" (featuring Ravyn Lenae & Jack Red)
- 13. "LEBRON JAMES" (co-produced with CAMEone)

=== 2019 ===
==== IDK - Is He Real? ====
- 14. "Julia..." (co-produced with IDK)

==== Wynne - If I May ====
- 01. "Roll Call"

=== 2020 ===
==== Curren$y - 3 Piece Set ====
- 01. "52 Seconds"
- 02. "Survivor's Remorse"
- 03. "Rag Top Love Affair"

==== Peter CottonTale - CATCH ====
- 11. "Find You (New Jerusalem)" (co-produced with Peter CottonTale)

==== HateSonny - Golden Child ====
- 07. "St. Mark" (co-produced with 5heriff)

==== Vic Mensa - V TAPE ====
- 02. "Machiavelli" (featuring Eryn Allen Kane) (co-produced with SC & Amir Johnson)
- 05. "Bethlehem / SC Freestyle" (co-produced with SC & Niko the Great)

==== Femdot - Buy One Get One Free, Vol. 1 ====
- 02. "Back Home"

==== Michael Christmas - Hiding ====
- 03. "Nissan Altima" (co-produced with Tee-WaTT)

=== 2021 ===
==== Topaz Jones - Don't Go Tellin' Your Momma ====
- 13. "Buggin'" (co-produced with Topaz Jones, Jack Hallenbeck & Alissia)

==== Skyzoo - All the Brilliant Things ====
- 03. "A Tour in the Neighbourhood" (featuring Al Skratch)

==== Amaria - Bittersweet ====
- 03. "Got Me Like" (featuring Mick Jenkins) (co-produced with Tee-WaTT & Niko the Great)

==== Mick Jenkins - Elephant in the Room ====
- 01. "The Valley of the Shadow of Death" (co-produced with Tee-WaTT & Renzell)

==== Radamiz – Every Bad Day Has Good News ====
- 02. "Ash Wednesday"

=== 2022 ===
==== Marcel Allen - Ebony Goddess ====
- 01. "Dinner Wit Hov"
- 02. "SALT!" (featuring Havoc) (co-produced with Jacob Rochester)
- 05. "4EvaStackin" (featuring Boldy James)
- 06. "Silver Surfer" (co-produced with Jacob Rochester)
- 07. "Dead Wrong" (co-produced with Jacob Rochester)
- 08. "Goddess" (co-produced with Jacob Rochester)

==== Cam'ron & A-Trak - U Wasn't There ====
- 01. "This is My City (Federal Reserve Version)" (co-produced with A-Trak)

==== G Herbo - Survivor's Remorse ====
- 1-07. "Real Rap" (featuring Benny the Butcher) (co-produced with CAMEone & Gerson Zaragoza)
- 1-09. "Shordie" (featuring Gunna) (co-produced with Oz on the Track & Don Rob)
- 2-07. "Machines" (featuring Conway the Machine)

==== Curren$y - The Drive In Theatre, Part 2 ====
- 03. "Umbrellas"
- 11. "Doe Boy"
- 13. "Sun Storm" (featuring Jade Angelle)
- 17. "MPR 2"
- 20. "30 Floors Up" (featuring Ura & Da$H)

=== 2023 ===
==== JELEEL! - REAL RAW! ====
- 08. "CONFETTI" (with Chow Lee) (co-produced with FaxOnly, Anthoine Walters, & Vooo)

==== Radamiz & Thelonious Martin - 2409 West Slauson ====
- 01. "Body Prints, 1992"
- 02. "33 Dice" (featuring Chuck Inglish & Dre Dollasz)
- 03. "Too Often"
- 04. "Pope Power"
- 05. "Lake Shrine/Sam Lindenfeld Speaks"

==== Nolan Lewis - Plastique ====
- 09. "Levels" (co-produced with Nolan Lewis)

==== AUSAR - I NOW KNOW. ====
- 11. "Tattoo"

==== Joey Purp - Heavy Heart, Vol. 1 ====
- 01. "There Must Be Caesar" (co-produced with Stefan Ponce)

==== Vic Mensa - Victor ====
- 05. "Weeping Poets" (featuring Jay Electronica) (co-produced with Bongo, Johan Lenox, Corbett, Subroza, & Vic Mensa)

==== Femdot. - Free Samples Vol. 2 ====
- 06. "Cowboy Bebop"

==== Nolan Lewis - Plastique (Deluxe) ====
- 18. "Levels (Remix)" (co-produced with Nolan Lewis)

=== 2024 ===
==== Mick Jenkins - The Patience (Deluxe Edition) ====
- 13. "Perm" (co-produced with Jacob Rochester)

==== Halsey - The Great Impersonator ====
- 13. "Arsonist" (co-produced with Halsey, Michael Uzowuru, & Rahm Silverglade)

==== J'Von - Green Suit EP ====
- 01. "Acrylic On Canvas"
- 02. "Nalgene Supreme"
- 04. "Friends Again" (featuring MoRuf)

==== Cordae - The Crossroads ====
- 12. "No Bad News" (featuring Kanye West) (co-produced with FnZ, BoogzDaBeast, & Smoko Ono)
- 15. "Syrup Sandwiches" (featuring Joey Bada$$) (co-produced with Smoko Ono)

=== 2025 ===
==== MIKE - Showbiz! ====
- 19. "Burning House" (co-produced with Jacob Rochester)
