= Waves (Mick Jenkins EP) =

EP by Mick Jenkins
- Released: August 21, 2015
- Genre: Hip-hop
- Length: 28:28
- Label: Cinematic
- Producers: Kaytranada; Lee Bannon; Mulatto; Stefan Ponce; THEMpeople

Mick Jenkins chronology
The Waters (2014)	Waves (2015)	The Healing Component (2016)

Waves (stylized as Wave[s]) is the debut extended play (EP) by American rapper Mick Jenkins. It was released on August 21, 2015, by Cinematic Music Group.

== Background ==
The extended play includes guest features from Saba, Sean Deaux, and The Mind. The majority of the production was by THEMpeople, with Kaytranada, Lee Bannon, Stefan Ponce and Mulatto also producing.

== Critical reception ==
Professional ratings
Aggregate scores
Source	Rating
AnyDecentMusic?	6.9/10
Metacritic	77/100
Review scores
Source	Rating
AllMusic	3.5/5 stars
Consequence of Sound	B+
Exclaim!	8/10
Pitchfork	7.6/10
PopMatters	7/10
Spin	8/10
XXL	4/5

Waves received generally positive reviews from critics. At Metacritic, which assigns a normalized rating out of 100 to reviews from mainstream publications, the album received an average score of 77, based on nine reviews. Paul Simpson of AllMusic stated, "His music seems a slight bit more danceable and accessible than before, but not to the point of pandering to a hedonistic club audience." Sheldon Pearce of Consequence of Sound stated, "The biggest difference between the two projects is that The Water[s] focused in on the dense raps, and Wave[s] is far more vibe-driven, with songs ready for radio." Samantha O'Connor of Exclaim! stated, "Wave[s] is a clear indication that Jenkins is expanding his sound and stepping away from expectation as he prepares his debut album, The Healing Component. But in the meantime, he's established himself as an artist with even more to offer than many predicted." Brian Duricy of PopMatters stated, "On Wave[s], Mick Jenkins, whether consciously or otherwise, created a polished body of work with radio-ready potential."

David Drake of Pitchfork stated, "It points to an artistic flexibility that will pay dividends down the road. The room to grow is there, should he decide to pursue the colors Wave[s] has opened up for him." Dan Weiss of Spin stated, "Wave[s] is louder, catchier, and about half the length of The Water[s]." Sidney Madden of XXL stated, "Although it doesn't pan out on every track, the cohesive work allows the listener to feel that they've plunged into the depths of Mick's mind and come out with a soaked sense of clarity."

== Track listing ==
No.	Title	Producer(s)	Length
1.	"Alchemy"	Lee Bannon; THEMpeople	3:09
2.	"Slumber" (featuring Saba, Sean Deaux and Donnie Trumpet)	THEMpeople	3:36
3.	"Get Up Get Down"	Stefan Ponce; THEMpeople	3:19
4.	"Your Love"	Kaytranada	3:14
5.	"Piano"	THEMpeople	2:08
6.	"The Giver"	THEMpeople	3:22
7.	"40 Below"	THEMpeople	3:25
8.	"P's & Q's"	Kaytranada	2:33
9.	"Perception" (featuring The Mind)	Mulatto; THEMpeople	3:42
Total length:			28:28
