= Pieces of a Man (Mick Jenkins album) =

Studio album by Mick Jenkins
- Released: October 26, 2018
- Recorded: 2016–2018
- Genres: Alternative hip-hop; conscious rap; spoken word; jazz rap
- Length: 53:11
- Labels: Free Nation; Cinematic
- Producers: Alexander Sowinski; BadBadNotGood; Ben Hixon; Black Milk; Dee Lilly; Green Sllime; High Klassified; Kaytranada; Nez & Rio; Nissim; OV; STLNDRMS; THEMpeople

Mick Jenkins chronology
The Healing Component (2016)	Pieces of a Man (2018)	The Circus (2020)

Singles from Pieces of a Man
- 1. "Understood" Released: October 12, 2018; 2. "Padded Locks" Released: October 21, 2018

Pieces of a Man is the second studio album by American rapper Mick Jenkins, released on October 26, 2018, via Free Nation and Cinematic Music Group.

== Background ==
The album's production came from multiple contributors such as THEMpeople, Black Milk, Dee Lilly, BadBadNotGood, Kaytranada, OV, Ben Hixon, STLNDRMS, Nez & Rio, and Ahwlee, among others. The album features guest appearances from Ghostface Killah, Julien Bell, Michael Anthony, Ben Hixon and Corinne Bailey Rae. Pieces of a Man also prominently pays homage to Gil Scott-Heron's 1971 debut studio album, Pieces of a Man.

== Singles ==
The album's release was preceded by two promotional singles: "Bruce Banner" and "What Am I To Do" on August 6 and 26, respectively. The album's first single, "Understood" was released on October 12, 2018, preceded its visuals the day before. The second single "Padded Locks" featuring veteran Wu-Tang Clan member Ghostface Killah was released on October 21, 2018.

== Critical reception ==
Professional ratings
Aggregate scores
Source	Rating
Metacritic	77/100
Review scores
Source	Rating
Consequence of Sound	B
Exclaim!	7/10
Northern Transmissions	8/10
Pitchfork	7.6/10
Rolling Stone	3/5 stars

Trey Alston of Highsnobiety gave the album four-and-a-half stars out of five, saying, "Pieces of A Man is at its strongest when it goes full in on that mesmerizingly simple urbane aesthetic, with Jenkins riding the wave with a relaxed nod and making good on his promise to deliver the most authentic experience possible." Gabriel Teodros of KEXP praised the album and listed it in his top 10 of 2018.

== Track listing ==
Credits adapted from Bandcamp and Tidal.

All tracks are written by Mick Jenkins.

No.	Title	Producer(s)	Length
1.	"Heron Flow" (featuring Julian Bell)	THEMpeople	3:17
2.	"Stress Fracture" (featuring Michael Anthony)	Black Milk	3:13
3.	"Gwendolynn's Apprehension"	Black Milk	3:45
4.	"Soft Porn"	THEMpeople; OV	3:42
5.	"Grace & Mercy"	Nez & Rio	1:51
6.	"Barcelona"	Nissim	2:34
7.	"Percy Interlude"		0:44
8.	"Reginald" (featuring Ben Hixon)	Ahwlee	2:48
9.	"Padded Locks" (featuring Ghostface Killah)	Kaytranada, BadBadNotGood	3:45
10.	"Ghost"	THEMpeople; OV	3:34
11.	"Heron Flow 2"	THEMpeople	2:09
12.	"Plain Clothes"	High Klassified	3:51
13.	"Pull Up"	Green Sllime; THEMpeople	4:27
14.	"Consensual Seduction" (featuring Corinne Bailey Rae)	STLNDRMS	3:46
15.	"U Turn"	THEMpeople; Ben Hixon	2:46
16.	"Understood"	Kaytranada; Alexander Sowinski	3:28
17.	"Smoking Song" (featuring BadBadNotGood)	BadBadNotGood	3:31
Total length:			53:11
