= Eryn Allen Kane =

American R&B musician

- Born: December 13, 1989 (age 36); Detroit, Michigan, United States
- Education: Columbia College Chicago
- Musical career
- Genres: R&B; soul; hip-hop
- Occupations: Singer; songwriter
- Labels: Eryn Allen Kane Music (Current); 1552 Music (Former)
- Website: www.erynallenkane.com

Eryn Allen Kane is an American rhythm and blues musician from Detroit, Michigan who has become a frequent collaborator in the Chicago Music scene. Kane released her first EP, Aviary: Act 1, in 2015. In 2016, Kane released her second EP titled Aviary: Act II. Kane was also featured on Chance the Rapper's album Coloring Book as well as the soundtrack of Spike Lee's film Chi-Raq. Kane released her third EP in 2019 titled A Tree Planted by Water.

Kane won the Grammy Award for Best Rap Performance in 2024 for her collaboration with Killer Mike, André 3000, and Future, titled "Scientists & Engineers".

== Discography ==
=== EPs ===
- Aviary: Act 1 (2015)
- Aviary: Act II (2016)
- A Tree Planted by Water (2019)

=== Guest appearances ===
List of guest appearances, with other performing artists, showing year released and album name
| Title | Year | Other performer(s) | Album |
|---|---|---|---|
| "Burnout" | 2014 | Saba | ComfortZone |
| "For Y'all" | 2014 | Saba & MC Tree G | ComfortZone |
| "Musicbx" | 2014 | Moody Good | Moody Good |
| "Wonderful Everyday (Arthur Theme)" | 2014 | Chance the Rapper, Jessie Ware, Francis and the Lights, Elle Varner, The O'Mys & Wyclef Jean | Non-album single |
| "Baltimore" | 2015 | Prince | Hit n Run Phase Two |
| "Born in Chicago" | 2015 | Bruce Hornsby & Sasha Go Hard | Chi-Raq: Original Motion Picture Soundtrack |
| "Heaven Only Knows" | 2015 | Towkio, Chance the Rapper & Lido | .Wav Theory |
| "Miracle" | 2015 | Nico Segal, Chance the Rapper, Peter Cottontale, Nate Fox & Raury | Surf |
| "Warm Enough" | 2015 | Nico Segal, Chance the Rapper, Peter Cottontale, Nate Fox, C-Sick, Noname, J. Cole & Knox Fortune | Surf |
| "Wanna Be Cool" | 2015 | Nico Segal, Chance the Rapper, Peter Cottontale, Nate Fox, Big Sean, Jeremih & Kyle | Surf |
| "Windows" | 2015 | Nico Segal, Chance the Rapper, Peter Cottontale, Nate Fox, Francis and the Lights, BJ the Chicago Kid, Raury & Jamila Woods | Surf |
| "Go" | 2015 | Nico Segal, Peter Cottontale, Nate Fox, Francis and the Lights, Jesse Boykins III, Joey Purp & Mike Golden | Surf |
| "Sunday Candy" | 2015 | Nico Segal, Chance the Rapper, Peter Cottontale, Nate Fox, Jamila Woods & Patrick Paige | Surf |
| "Same Drugs" | 2016 | Chance the Rapper | Coloring Book |
| "Finish Line / Drown" | 2016 | Chance the Rapper, T-Pain, Kirk Franklin & Noname | Coloring Book |
| "Reality Check" | 2016 | Noname & Akenya | Telefone |
| "Remember (Mufasa Interlude)" | 2019 | James Earl Jones | The Lion King: The Gift |
| "At This Point" | 2019 | Daveed Diggs, Rafael Casal, Chris Lee, Matthew Santos, Samora Pinderhughes & Emmy Raver-Lampman | Seven Nights in Chicago |
| "MACHIAVELLI" | 2020 | Vic Mensa | V Tape |
| "Hi 5" | 2020 | Peter Cottontale, Grace Weber, Sing Harlem & Yebba | CATCH |
| "Galaxy" | 2022 | JID | The Forever Story |
| "Lauder Too" | 2022 | JID & Ravyn Lenae | The Forever Story |
| "An Interlude Called 'Circus" | 2022 | Saba | Few Good Things |
| "Few Good Things" | 2022 | Saba & Black Thought | Few Good Things |
| "Lee & Lovie" | 2022 | Smino, Phoelix & Reggie | Luv 4 Rent |
| "Motherless" | 2023 | Killer Mike | Michael |
| "Balloons" | 2023 | Noname & Jay Electronica | Sundial |
| "Apologize" | 2024 | Big Sean | Better Me Than You |
