= Successor (album) =

$uccessor

Studio album by Dedekind Cut
- Released: November 11, 2016
- Studios: Cutting Room Studios, Manhattan; Mexican Summer Studios, Brooklyn; Gresham Hotel, Dublin
- Genres: New-age; ambient; noise
- Length: 40:56
- Labels: NON Worldwide; Hospital
- Producers: Fred Warmsley; Al Carlson

Dedekind Cut chronology
American Zen (2016)	$uccessor (2016)	Tahoe (2018)

Singles from $uccessor
- 1. "46:50"; 2. "Conversation with Angels"

Side B
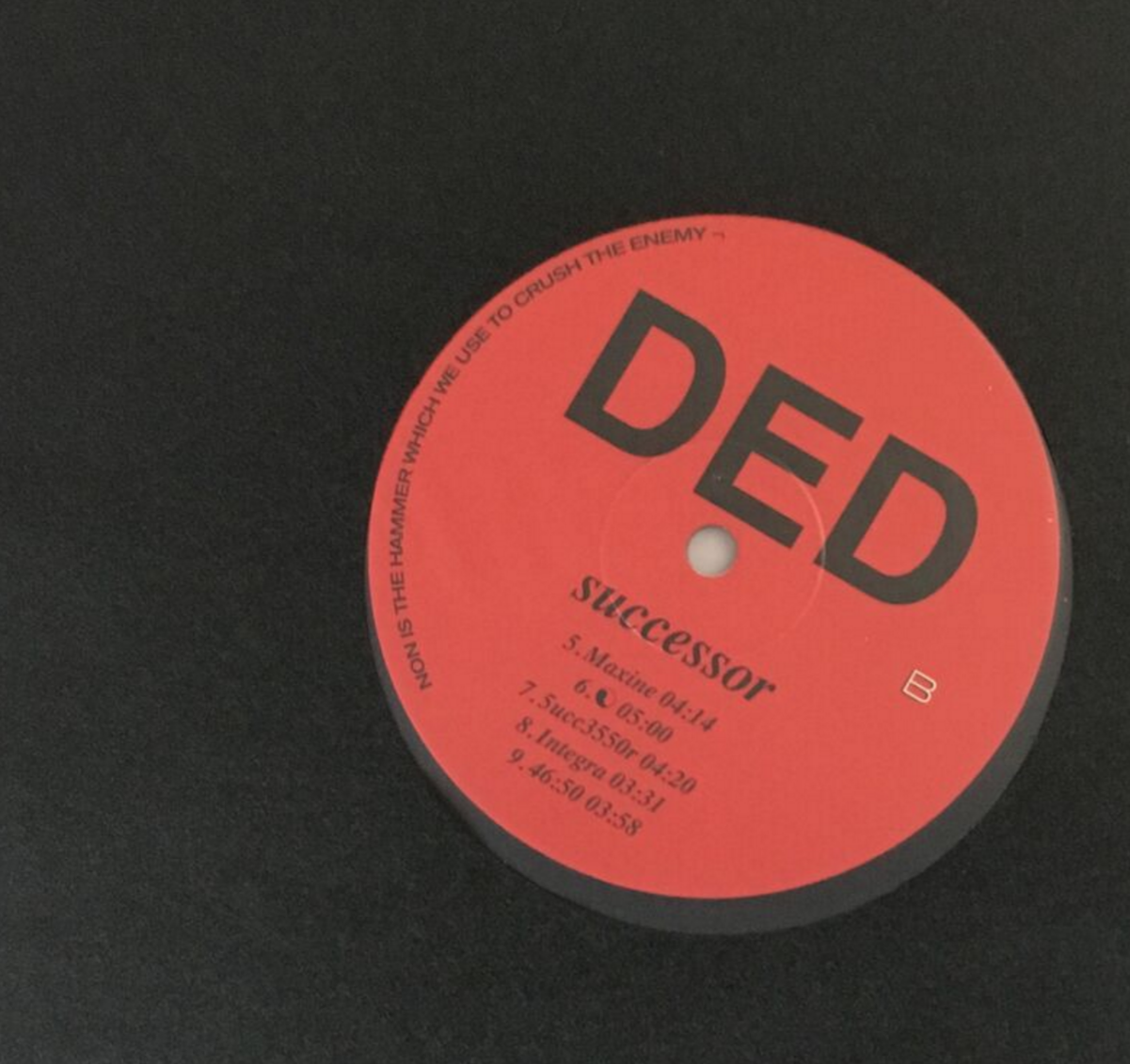

Successor (stylized as $uccessor) is the debut studio album by American experimental artist Fred Warmsley, under the alias Dedekind Cut. It was released on 11 November 2016, by NON Worldwide and Hospital Productions. The album features guest vocals from Active Child, as well as co-production from producer Al Carlson, influential for his work on Oneohtrix Point Never's Replica and St. Vincent's Marry Me.

== Background and recording ==
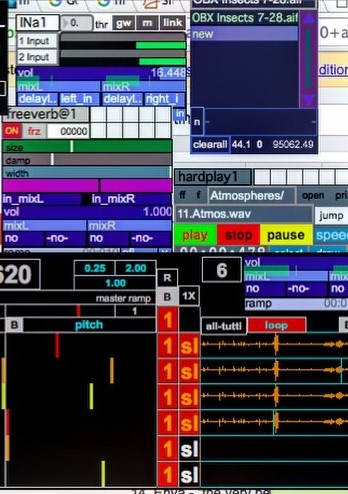
The Cycling '74 software Max was used in a majority of the recording of $uccessor.

In 2013, Warmsley, then known as Lee Bannon and for his production work with Pro Era, began to explore a more experimental sound as a solo artist. In June 2013, he self-released NW/WB, which showcased strong jungle and drum and bass influences and garnered a significant amount of attention. The project drew the interest of record labels including Warp Records, Sacred Bones Records and Ninja Tune, which signed Warmsley in October 2013. His debut studio album, entitled Alternate/Endings, was released on January 9, 2014, to critical acclaim. Rolling Stone placed Alternate/Endings at number 15 of its "20 Best EDM, Electronic and Dance Albums of 2014".

On May 26, 2015, Warmsley announced via a hand-written note shared on his Instagram page that he would be changing his moniker from Lee Bannon to "¬ b" (meaning "not Bannon"). He wrote that Pattern of Excel would be his final release as Lee Bannon, adding that he felt the name had "reached its limits" and that "the future can no longer exist in the same realm with music I created when I was 17, fickle and still developing." Early recording for $uccessor, then titled ANA, began in December 2014 at Warmsley's personal studio in Brooklyn, New York City, but was put on hold while Warmsley released the album Patterns of Excel.

With the inception of the name Dedekind Cut, recording on $uccessor resumed in the summer of 2015 in Dublin, Ireland. On September 9, 2015, Warmsley released an EP entitled tHot eNhançeR, his first release as Dedekind Cut, during the making of which Warmsley befriended NON Worldwide founder Chino Amobi, leading to the label's involvement in the release of $uccessor.

During the fall of 2015, Warmsley began working with Al Carlson on completing the album. They both used Max looping rigs and the Roland Integra-7 synth. In February 2016, various tracks in their demo forms were used to create the EP American Zen, Warmsley's first release with Hospital Productions, with unreleased tracks made exclusively available on his Bandcamp page as free bonus tracks. On September 1, 2016, it was announced that the album would be released on November 11, 2016.

On November 9, 2016, the album's second half and unused bonus tracks were made available for streaming and downloading on Wikipedia and MediaFire respectively.

== Influences ==
In a 2016 interview with the Red Bull Music Academy, Warmsley cited the 'downtown music' of Philip Glass, Steve Reich and Laurie Anderson, along with some of his contemporary collaborators including Juliana Huxtable and Chino Amobi as major influences on the cultural meaning of the album. Michael Cretu's "Return to Innocence" and MCMXC a.D., along with other new age releases were used as sonic markers by Warmsley and producer Al Carlson during the mixing process. Yanni's "One Man's Dream" and Moby's "When It's Cold I'd Like to Die" from his 1995 album Everything Is Wrong were also cited. The English cross-genre experimental group Coil was also noted as being a heavy influence on the early 2015 recording sessions. French composer Erik Satie's concept of "furniture music" inspired both the piano played at the end of the first single "46:50", and the release of limited-edition yoga/meditation mats that accompanied the announcement of the album.

== Critical reception ==
Professional ratings
Review scores
Source	Rating
AllMusic	4/5 stars
Pitchfork	8.2/10
Tiny Mix Tapes	4.5/5 stars
The Drainage	8.4/10

Successor has received generally positive reviews from music critics. Paul Simpson of AllMusic gave the album 4 out of 5 stars, saying that the album is "a chilly, bracing examination of fear and hope, and it's easily the producer's most ambitious work yet." Thea Ballard of Pitchfork also gave the album a good review, commenting that the album "is marked by the productive discomfort that accompanies such unabashed intensity. Whereas American Zen maintained a temperate pace, $uccessor isn’t afraid to crescendo or screech to a halt."

Will Neibergall of Tiny Mix Tapes gave the album 4-and-a-half out of 5 stars, stating: "Not quite abstraction and note quite representation, $uccessor is marked by its persistent attendance of texture and relationship in sound, placing them high above rhythm and melody." Emory Michael of The Drainage gave the album a positive review, but showed skepticism over the album "hovering between several different genres", which he said is "good because it shows off Warmsley's taste and creative dexterity, and bad because, well, this album is bound to be perceived as a 'what the fuck is going on' Eric Andre Show set."

=== Accolades ===
Publication	Accolade	Year	Rank
Pitchfork	The 20 Best Experimental Albums of 2016	2016	—
Tiny Mix Tapes	Favourite 50 Music Releases	2016	17
The Vinyl Factory	The 50 Best Albums of 2016	2016	5

== Track listing ==
Side A
No.	Title	Writer(s)	Length
1.	"Descend from Now"	Fred Warmsley; Claude Speeed	2:48
2.	"Instinct"	Warmsley; Dominick Fernow	4:09
3.	"Conversation with Angels"	Warmsley; Chino Amobi; Joshua Davis; Al Carlson; Mason Youngblood	8:33
4.	"Fear in Reverse"	Warmsley	4:26
Total length:			19:56

Side B
No.	Title	Writer(s)	Length
5.	"Maxine"	Warmsley	4:14
6.	"☯"	Warmsley	5:02
7.	"5ucc3550r"	Warmsley; Angelo Valerio; Eric Burton	4:19
8.	"Integra"	Warmsley; Carlson	3:29
9.	"46:50"	Warmsley; Patrick Grossi	3:56
Total length:			21:00

Bonus tracks
No.	Title	Length
1.	"Untitled"	2:26
2.	"In a Room"	5:45
3.	"Ayahuasca binary 010"	4:32

== Personnel ==
- Chino Amobi – Additional production
- Brunnen – Additional production
- Al Carlson – Mixing, mastering, keyboard, flute
- Claud Speeed – Additional production
- Joshua "DJ Shadow" Davis – Additional production
- Lochlan Doyle – Album art design
- Dominick Fernow – Drums
- Patrick "Active Child" Grossi – Vocals
- Deana Lawson – Photography
- Alec Saint Martin – Vocals
- Angelo "Angel-ho" Valerio – Additional production
- Fred Warmsley – producer
- Mason Youngblood – Additional production
