= Alternate/Endings =

Studio album by Lee Bannon
- Released: December 9, 2013
- Recorded: 2012–2013
- Genre: Electronic
- Length: 1:06:05
- Label: Ninja Tune

Lee Bannon chronology
Alternate/Endings (2013)	Pattern of Excel (2015)

Alternate/Endings is the debut full-length studio album by American record producer Lee Bannon. It was released on December 9, 2013 via Ninja Tune. The album marks Bannon's distancing from hip-hop and towards drum-and-bass and jungle music.

== Critical reception ==
Professional ratings
Aggregate scores
Source	Rating
Metacritic	79/100
Review scores
Source	Rating
Exclaim!	9/10
Financial Times	4/5 stars
Pitchfork	6.8/10
Slant	3.5/5 stars
The 405	7/10
The Irish Times	4/5 stars
The Line of Best Fit	7/10

Alternate/Endings was met with generally favourable reviews from music critics. At Metacritic, which assigns a normalized rating out of 100 to reviews from mainstream publications, the album received an average score of 79 based on eleven reviews.

Daryl Keating of Exclaim! praised the album, stating: "realistically, Alternate/Endings is not for everyone, but anyone who's intrigued by the dark and unconventional side of things--or thinks that jungle needs a new platform--will devour this album". Chase Woodruff of Slant magazine found the album "succeeds in leaving you both exhausted and anxious for more". Andrew Hannah of The Line of Best Fit wrote: "Alternate/Endings is never a relaxing listen; when the breakneck pace drops, it's only replaced by an unsettling calm, and one that doesn't last very long". Andrew Gaerig of Pitchfork called it "tempting, smart, and raw enough to make me wish he'd set up camp somewhere more permanent".

== Track listing ==
No.	Title	Length
1.	"Resorectah"	4:14
2.	"NW/WB"	6:36
3.	"Prime/Decent"	4:39
4.	"Shoot Out the Stars and Win"	3:28
5.	"Bent/Sequence"	5:26
6.	"Phoebe Cates"	4:01
7.	"216"	5:41
8.	"Perfect/Division"	3:50
9.	"Value 10"	4:17
10.	"Cold/Melt"	3:58
11.	"Readly/Available"	9:30
12.	"Eternal/Attack"	6:24
13.	"Alternate/Endings"	4:01
Total length:		1:06:05
