= Tahoe (album) =

Studio album by Dedekind Cut
- Released: February 23, 2018
- Length: 52:18
- Label: Kranky
- Producer: Fred Warmsley

Dedekind Cut chronology
Successor (2016)	Tahoe (2018)

Professional ratings
Aggregate scores
Source	Rating
Metacritic	75/100
Review scores
Source	Rating
AllMusic	4/5 stars
Drowned in Sound	8/10
Exclaim!	8/10
Pitchfork	7.2/10

Tahoe is the second studio album by American musician Fred Warmsley, under the alias Dedekind Cut. It was released on February 23, 2018, by Kranky.

== Critical reception ==
Tahoe was met with "generally favorable" reviews from critics. At Metacritic, which assigns a weighted average rating out of 100 to reviews from mainstream publications, this release received an average score of 75, based on 8 reviews. Aggregator Album of the Year gave the release a 75 out of 100 based on a critical consensus of 6 reviews.

== Track listing ==
Tahoe track listing
No.	Title	Length
1.	"Equity"	4:17
2.	"The Crossing Guard"	10:08
3.	"Tahoe"	4:59
4.	"MMXVIII"	9:21
5.	"De-Civilization"	3:36
6.	"Spiral"	3:17
7.	"Hollow Earth"	12:15
8.	"Virtues"	4:25
