= Room 25 =

Studio album by Noname
- Released: September 14, 2018
- Recorded: July–September 2018
- Genres: Jazz rap; neo soul
- Length: 34:49
- Producers: Phoelix; Luke Titus; Brian Sanborn

Noname chronology
| Telefone (2016) | Room 25 (2018) | Sundial (2023) |

Room 25 is the debut studio album by American hip hop recording artist Noname. Recorded in about a month's time, the album chronicles the two years since the release of Noname's debut mixtape Telefone, most notably her move from Chicago to Los Angeles and an intense, short-lived romantic relationship.

Room 25 was entirely produced by Phoelix, who previously worked as a producer on Telefone. It features guest appearances by Ravyn Lenae, Smino, Saba, and Phoelix among others. The album was self-released through digital services on September 14, 2018. The album was met with universal acclaim from music critics, including veteran critic Robert Christgau, who later named it the fifth-best album of the 2010s.

== Background ==
Following the release of her debut mixtape Telefone, Noname embarked on a headlining tour, after which she moved from her native Chicago to Los Angeles. In Los Angeles, she also experienced her first sexually active relationship. On the experience, she compared her maturity on Room 25 to Telefone, saying "Telefone was a very PG record because I was very PG. I just hadn't had sex." In Los Angeles, Noname also participated in the local comedy scene, a community that influenced the humorous tone found on Room 25.

Unlike Telefone, Room 25 was created due to a financial obligation. Noname said in an interview, "It came to a point where it was, like, I needed to make an album because I need to pay my rent. I could've done another Telefone tour, but I can't play those songs anymore. Like, I could, but I physically hate it because I've just been playing them for so long." Noname paid for the entire album herself using money from touring and guest appearances on Chance the Rapper projects.

In July 2017, Noname announced that her follow-up to Telefone would be titled Room 25. In June 2018, Noname tweeted that she was "excited" to release new music, under the project name Room 25. In August 2018, she announced a September release date.

== Artwork and title ==
The album's cover art was revealed on September 10, 2018 along with the album's release date. The artwork was created by Chicagoan artist Bryant Giles.

The album's title is in reference to Noname's lifestyle while in Los Angeles, living out of different hotel rooms, and that she was 25 years old at the time.

Following accusations of sexual and physical assault against Giles, the artist whose artwork is featured as the album cover art, Noname has stated that she intends to change the artwork in support of victims, tweeting: "I do not and will not support abusers, and I will always stand up for victims and believe their stories." Giles was arrested on October 8 on the domestic battery charge for allegedly grabbing girlfriend Ellie Danisch by the throat, tossing her against the wall and striking her in the throat with a closed fist, according to authorities. He was found not guilty in January 2019. As of 2025, Noname has yet to change the artwork of Room 25.

== Release and promotion ==
Room 25 was released on September 14, 2018. Following the album's release, Noname announced she would be embarking on a 19-date tour in support of Room 25 starting in January 2019. She performed a three song medley of "Blaxploitation," "Prayer Song," and "Don't Forget About Me" from the album in her solo television debut on The Late Show With Stephen Colbert on October 17, 2018.

== Critical reception ==
Professional ratings
Aggregate scores
| Source | Rating |
|---|---|
| AnyDecentMusic? | 8.5/10 |
| Metacritic | 93/100 |
Review scores
| Source | Rating |
| AllMusic | 4.5/5 stars |
| The A.V. Club | A |
| Chicago Tribune | 3.5/4 stars |
| Clash | 8/10 |
| Consequence of Sound | A− |
| Exclaim! | 7/10 |
| NME | 5/5 stars |
| Pitchfork | 8.6/10 |
| PopMatters | 9/10 |
| Vice (Expert Witness) | A |

Room 25 was met with widespread acclaim and rave reviews by critics. At Metacritic, which assigns a normalized rating out of 100 to reviews from mainstream publications, Room 25 received an average score of 93, based on 17 reviews, indicating "universal acclaim".

Reviewing the album for The A.V. Club, Dianca London Potts stated that "From beginning to end, Room 25 is a testimony to the power of telling your story and the hope that can be found in doing so without apology." In the review for AllMusic, Paul Simpson claimed "Her complex lyrics are delivered with ease and confidence, and she's backed up by jazzy, sophisticated rhythms and occasional lush string arrangements." Ural Garrett from HipHopDX said that the album "finely tunes the best assets in Noname's artistic toolset while digging further into her own head; anticipating where the rabbit hole journey goes becomes part of the enjoyment."

El Hunt of NME described the album as "flawless", adding that it is "smartly constructed and laced with intricate subtlety." Rolling Stone declared Noname as "One of the Best Rappers Alive" and included her on a list of "Artists You Need to Know". Briana Younger of Pitchfork designated Room 25 as "Best New Music" and wrote that it is "a transcendent coming-of-age tale built around cosmic jazz and neo-soul, delivered by a woman deeply invested in her interiority and that of the world around her." M. Oliver of PopMatters proclaimed the album to be "vintage neo-soul and future rap hand in hand; a soulful sanctuary for those turned off by the austerity of mainstream mumble rap".

Amongst the more critical reviews of the album, M. T. Richards from Exclaim! wrote "If Noname has one glaring weakness, it's a tendency to ramble without ever seeing the need to switch up her rat-tat-tat triplet flow. She does, though, have the rumpled, mellower-than-thou swagger to pull it off, and why complain when Room 25 is the prettiest rap record to come along in months?" XLR8R's Sam Davis suggested Noname had yet to achieve her full potential: "If “Prayer Song” and “Blaxploitation” are anything to go by, she could yet become a great rapper. For now, she’s a good one."

Room 25 was ranked the 38th best release of the year in The Wire magazine's annual critics' poll. It was voted 7th in the 2018 Pazz & Jop critic’s poll. In 2019, Pitchfork ranked Room 25 at number 160 on their list of "The 200 Best Albums of the 2010s"; contributor Stephen Kearse wrote: "The album is the sound of a rapper realizing her powers and testing them for herself and no one else."

=== Year-end rankings ===
| Publication | Accolade | Rank | Ref. |
|---|---|---|---|
| Bandcamp | Top 100 Albums of 2018 | 3 | |
| Esquire | Top 20 Albums of 2018 | 4 | |
| GQ (Russia) | The 20 Best Albums of 2018 | 6 | |
| NPR | Top 50 Albums of 2018 | 5 | |
| Pitchfork | The 50 Best Albums of 2018 | 15 | |
| The Key | Top 15 Albums of 2018 | 2 | |
| Treble | Top 50 Albums of 2018 | 4 | |
| Vinyl Me, Please | Top 40 Albums of 2018 | 4 | |
| Exclaim! | Top 10 Hip-Hop Albums of 2018 | 3 | |

== Track listing ==
Credits adapted from Qobuz.

| No. | Title | Writer(s) | Producer(s) | Length |
|---|---|---|---|---|
| 1. | "Self" | Fatima Warner | Phoelix | 1:35 |
| 2. | "Blaxploitation" | Warner | Phoelix | 2:13 |
| 3. | "Prayer Song" (featuring Adam Ness) | Warner; Ness | Phoelix; Luke Titus | 4:18 |
| 4. | "Window" (featuring Phoelix) | Warner; Michael Neil | Phoelix; Brian Sanborn; Titus | 4:38 |
| 5. | "Don't Forget About Me" | Warner | Phoelix | 3:39 |
| 6. | "Regal" | Warner | Phoelix | 2:48 |
| 7. | "Montego Bae" (featuring Ravyn Lenae) | Warner; Lenae | Phoelix | 2:44 |
| 8. | "Ace" (featuring Smino and Saba) | Warner; Chris Smith Jr.; Tahj Malik Chandler | Phoelix | 3:03 |
| 9. | "Part of Me" (featuring Phoelix and Benjamin Earl Turner) | Warner; Neil; Turner | Phoelix; Sanborn; Titus | 3:16 |
| 10. | "With You" | Warner | Phoelix; Sanborn; Titus | 2:29 |
| 11. | "No Name" (featuring Yaw and Adam Ness) | Warner; Yaw Agyeman; Ness | Phoelix; Titus | 4:06 |
| Total length: | | | | 34:49 |

Notes

- "No Name" is stylized in lowercase as "no name"
- "Blaxploitation" contains a sample from the 1973 film The Spook Who Sat By the Door

== Personnel ==
Credits adapted from Noname's Twitter.

- Noname – executive production, lead vocals
- Phoelix – executive production, featured vocals (tracks 4, 9), bass, keys, drums
- Adam Ness – featured vocals (tracks 3, 11)
- Ravyn Lenae – featured vocals (track 7)
- Smino – featured vocals (track 8)
- Saba – featured vocals (track 8)
- Benjamin Earl Turner – featured vocals (track 9)
- Yaw – featured vocals (track 11)
- Arima Ederra – additional vocals
- Blake Davis – additional vocals
- Sophie Dimitroff – additional vocals
- Luke Titus Sangerman – drums
- Brian Sanborn – guitar
- Matt Jones – string arrangement
- Elton "L10MixedIt" Chueng – mixing, mastering
- Bryant Giles – artwork
