= The Patience =

Studio album by Mick Jenkins
- Released: August 18, 2023
- Genre: Hip-hop
- Length: 27:53
- Labels: RBC; BMG
- Producers: Beat Butcha; Berg; Dilip; Hollywood Cole; Jake One; Keira Banks; Kulture; Otxhello; Stoic; Tee-WaTT; Venna; VNSN; Yama//Sato

Mick Jenkins chronology
Elephant in the Room (2021)	The Patience (2023)

Singles from The Patience
- 1. "Smoke Break-Dance" Released: July 7, 2023; 2. "Guapanese" Released: July 28, 2023

The Patience is the fourth studio album by American rapper Mick Jenkins, released on August 18, 2023, released through RBC Records and BMG. The album features guest appearances from Freddie Gibbs, Benny the Butcher, JID, and Vic Mensa.

== Background ==
Mick Jenkins announced the album on July 7, 2023. On the same day, he released the album's lead single, "Smoke Break-Dance" featuring American rapper JID, alongside a music video. On July 28, 2023, Jenkins announced the album's tracklist, alongside the album's second single, "Guapanese." The album released on August 18, 2023.

In October 2023, Jenkins announced the "Thank You for Waiting Tour" with Canadian rapper TOBi in support of the album. The tour began on January 19, 2024 in Chicago and ends on March 6, 2024 in Leeds. The deluxe version of the album released on January 19, 2024.

== Critical reception ==
Professional ratings
Aggregate scores
Source	Rating
Metacritic	86/100
Review scores
Source	Rating
Beats per Minute	78%
HipHopDX	4.2/5
The Line of Best Fit	9/10
Sputnikmusic	4.5/5

According to the review aggregator Metacritic, The Patience received "universal acclaim" based on a weighted average score of 86 out of 100 from 4 critic scores.

Writing for Beats per Minute, Steve Forstneger praised the album's production as "a familiar mixture of soulful jazz, jazzy soul, and beats that range from distorted snares to spartan R&B." Alec Siegel of HipHopDX praised Jenkins' writing and delivery on the album, stating: "Jenkins plows through the album with rabid intensity, allowing his delivery to do most of the talking. His writing is crisp and to the point, but it’s his voice – the captivating vigor – that dominates each track." Sheldon Pearce of NPR Music described the album as "a controlled but emphatic album constantly evaluating the measures of his artistry and its place in his development as a person." The Line of Best Fit's Steven Loftin praised the album as a "classy combination" of jazz instrumentals with Jenkins' "pent up thoughts on everything from the state of rap to racial injustice." Writing for BrooklynVegan, Andrew Sacher praised Jenkins' performance on the album, writing: "As ever, he’s a masterful rhymer, an out-of-the-box thinker, and he has an ear for melody. On The Patience, he applies those familiar tricks in new settings and proves to be more versatile than ever." KTSW's Thomas Stevens concludes his review writing: "Jenkins delivers on every song with finesse and with almost zero words wasted." Calum Slingerland of Exclaim! described Jenkins' delivery on the album as "his most urgent in recent memory" and that it drives "determined observations on money, clout, authenticity, resilience and ways of coping with the highs and lows."

Year-end lists
Publication	Accolade	Rank	Ref.
HipHopDX	Best Rap Albums Of 2023	—N/a	
The Line of Best Fit	2023 Albums of the year	16	
NPR Music	Best Albums of 2023	—N/a	

== Track listing ==
No.	Title	Writer(s)	Producer(s)	Length
1.	"Michelin Star"	Jayson Jenkins; Bailey Goldberg; Levante Vinson; Tyron	Berg; VNSN	1:55
2.	"Show & Tell" (featuring Freddie Gibbs)	Jenkins; Goldberg; Fredrick Jamel Tipton	Berg; VNSN	4:20
3.	"Sitting Ducks" (featuring Benny the Butcher)	Jenkins; Jai Nitai Allard; Jeremie Damon Pennick; Sonnie-Angelo Tanas-Bactad	Yama//Sato; VNSN	2:17
4.	"Smoke Break-Dance" (featuring JID)	Jenkins; Matthew Moleta; Destin Route	Stoic	2:47
5.	"007"	Jenkins; Goldberg	Berg; VNSN	2:26
6.	"2004"	Jenkins; Terry Kevontay Watson	Tee-WaTT; Keira Banks	1:25
7.	"ROY G. BIV"	Jenkins; Eliot Dubock; Malik Venner	Venna; Beat Butcha; Jake One	1:54
8.	"Pasta"	Jenkins; Goldberg	Berg; VNSN	2:25
9.	"Farm to Table" (featuring Vic Mensa)	Jenkins; Goldberg; Victor Kwesi Mensah; Dilip Venkatesh; Othello Houston	Berg; Dilip; Otxhello	3:08
10.	"Guapanese"	Jenkins; Moleta; Skyler Lamoine Kieler	Stoic; Kulture	2:24
11.	"Mop"	Jenkins	Hollywood Cole	2:48
Total length:				27:53

Deluxe edition
No.	Title	Writer(s)	Producer(s)	Length
12.	"2011"	Jenkins	Venna	2:50
13.	"Perm"	Jenkins	Thelonious Martin; Jacob Rochester	1:57
14.	"Michelin Star (Instrumental)"		Berg; VNSN	2:00
15.	"Show & Tell (Instrumental)"		Berg; VNSN	3:32
16.	"Sitting Ducks (Instrumental)"		Yama//Sato; VNSN	2:06
17.	"Smoke Break-Dance (Instrumental)"		Stoic	2:55
18.	"007 (Instrumental)"		Berg; VNSN	2:32
19.	"2004 (Instrumental)"		Tee-WaTT; Keira Banks	1:26
20.	"ROY G. BIV (Instrumental)"		Venna; Beat Butcha; Jake One	2:01
21.	"Pasta (Instrumental)"		Berg; VNSN	2:34
22.	"Farm to Table (Instrumental)"		Berg; Dilip; Otxhello	3:08
23.	"Guapanese (Instrumental)"		Stoic; Kulture	2:24
24.	"Mop (Instrumental)"		Hollywood Cole	2:16
Total length:				59:48
