= Sundial (album) =

- Cover based on John Gurche's reconstruction of Homo floresiensis specimen LB1

Studio album by Noname
- Released: August 11, 2023
- Length: 31:50
- Producer: Saba; Yussef Dayes; Wesley Singerman; Berg; BMC; Daoud; emil; Gaetan Judd; Kevin Efofo; Ben Nartey; Nascent; R-Kay; Slimwav

Noname chronology
Room 25 (2018)	Sundial (2023)

Sundial is the second studio album by American hip hop artist Noname. It was self-released on August 11, 2023, and features guest appearances by Ayoni, Eryn Allen Kane, Jay Electronica, Common and Billy Woods, amongst others.

== Background ==
On May 15, 2019, Noname broke the news about her second studio album being titled Factory Baby. The album was expected to be released in late 2021 but was later scrapped. According to the rapper, she had trouble finding producers she could "genuinely connect with sonically".

On April 9, 2023, she revealed details of the upcoming album and a release date slated for July. The lead single "Balloons" with Eryn Allen Kane and Jay Electronica, her first solo single in three years, was announced on July 13 and initially planned to be released on July 21. However, the news caused backlash amongst her fans due to some of Electronica's controversial statements and led to the cancellation of the single, which she said she would rather share "with the rest of the album". While arguing with fans online, she went as far as pondering whether to release the album at all. The definitive release date and tracklist of the album spanning 11 tracks were also shared on July 13. Further guest artists included Common, Billy Woods, Ayoni, $ilkmoney and Stout.

== Promotion ==
Noname performed some of the tracks at rapper Mike's Young World III festival on July 15. To further promote the record, Noname announced the "Sundial Block Party", expected to take place in Chicago on August 17.

== Controversy ==
Following the release of the album, Jay Electronica was accused of antisemitism and of suggesting the war in Ukraine is "a hoax" for his verse on "Balloons".

== Critical reception ==
Professional ratings
Aggregate scores
Source	Rating
AnyDecentMusic?	8.2/10
Metacritic	87/100
Review scores
Source	Rating
AllMusic	3.5/5 stars
Beats Per Minute	83%
Clash	8/10
The Guardian	4/5 stars
The Line of Best Fit	9/10
Pitchfork	8.8/10
PopMatters	9/10
Rolling Stone	4/5 stars
Slant Magazine	4/5 stars

Sundial was met with widespread acclaim and rave reviews by critics. At Metacritic, which assigns a normalized rating out of 100 to reviews from mainstream publications, Sundial received an average score of 87, based on nine reviews, indicating "universal acclaim".

Reviewing the album for AllMusic. Paul Simpson felt that, "Sundial has a harsher tone than Noname's previous efforts, but it still contains many powerful, thought-provoking lines, and her skills as an emcee have never been stronger." In the review for Clash, Robin Murray wrote that, "[By] Refusing to take the easy route, ‘Sundial’ can at times be daunting, and the task of following the profound success of her earlier work isn’t an easy one. On repeated listens, however, the project breaks open as a singular work of Black American artistry." In The Guardian, Ben Beaumont-Thomas claimed, "You sense some listeners will find Sundial too ethically complex and contrary. Hopefully many more will flock to Noname, who brings piercing intellect and joie de vivre to tough questions. A librarian, yes, but also a moon stalker."

Writing for The Line of Best Fit, Noah Barker commented that, "Her striking lyrical flow has become more relentless but comes off more like a constant drip of honey than an imposing assault, at least sonically. On the other hand, the subject matter of the lyrics is rife with Socratic lines of moral questioning and political comedy. Every track excels in a topical focus that will not be spoiled or summarized by the deadline-watching eyes of a critic." For Pitchfork, Alphonse Pierre claimed, "The one slight drag of Sundial: In contrast to Noname constantly barring out, her hooks sound a little weak, as on “Hold Me Down,” where her plain melodies are backed by the type of full-throated choir that sounded better on Chance’s Coloring Book. The features, however, are explosive." in the review for PopMatters, Luis Aguasvias wrote, " There are outstanding performances throughout Sundial. Rapper billy woods in “Gospel?” spews magma, and Chicago legend Common drops a verse on the song “Oblivion” that could have easily fit into his great album Be from 2005. The singer Ayoni adds her voice on two tracks to make Sundial feel like a momentous occasion."

== Track listing ==
Sundial track listing
No.	Title	Writer(s)	Producer(s)	Length
1.	"Black Mirror"	Fatimah Warner	Daoud	2:17
2.	"Hold Me Down" (featuring Jimetta Rose and the Voices of Creation)	Warner; Jimetta Rose	Gaetan Judd; Kevin Efofo; BMC^{[a]}	2:21
3.	"Balloons" (featuring Eryn Allen Kane and Jay Electronica)	Warner; Jay Electronica	Saba; Ben Nartey	3:44
4.	"Boomboom" (featuring Ayoni)	Warner; Ayoni	Judd	3:22
5.	"Potentially the Interlude"	Warner	Wesley Singerman; Yussef Dayes	2:07
6.	"Namesake"	Warner	Slimwav	2:58
7.	"Beauty Supply"	Warner	emil; R-Kay^{[b]}	3:13
8.	"Toxic"	Warner	Saba; Nartey; AJ Halls	3:14
9.	"Afro Futurism"	Warner	Nascent	2:00
10.	"Gospel?" (featuring Silkmoney, Billy Woods, and Stout)	Warner; Silkmoney; Stout; Billy Woods	Judd	3:36
11.	"Oblivion" (featuring Ayoni and Common)	Warner; Common	Berg	2:58
Total length:				31:50

Notes

- ^{^[a]} signifies a co-producer
- ^{^[b]} signifies an additional producer
- All track titles are stylized in all lowercase

== Charts ==
Chart performance for Sundial
Chart (2023)	Peak position
UK Album Downloads (OCC)	99
