= Elephant in the Room (album) =

Studio album by Mick Jenkins
- Released: October 29, 2021
- Recorded: 2020–2021
- Genres: Hip-hop; conscious rap; jazz rap
- Length: 38:17
- Labels: Free Nation; Cinematic
- Producers: Eli Brown; Kiran Kai; LeRoyce; lophiile; Monte Booker; Rascal; Renzell; Saba; Tae Beast; Tee-WaTT; Thelonious Martin

Mick Jenkins chronology
The Circus (2020)	Elephant in the Room (2021)	The Patience (2023)

Singles from Elephant in the Room
- 1. "Truffles" Released: June 23, 2021; 2. "Contacts" Released: October 8, 2021; 3. "Scottie Pippen" Released: October 22, 2021

Elephant in the Room is the third studio album by American rapper Mick Jenkins, released on October 29, 2021, via Free Nation and Cinematic Music Group.

== Background ==
Jenkins created a website as part of the album rollout. The website is password protected, with the password being Carefree. On the website, he explained the concept of the album saying:

This album is an attempt to address various unspoken personal and/or general truths. And how they have affected me and can affect those around me. From my estranged relationship with my father to friendships that don't feel the same anymore to the even more basic idea of acknowledging that I need help. We become accustomed to allowing none progressive qualities and truths to occupy so much space in our lives simply by ignoring them, or ignoring them despite them being right in our faces! I intend to face several of those dormant issues/topics head-ons in the hopes that others can, at the very least, identify with the spaces I've grown from.

== Recording and production ==
The album's production came from multiple contributors such as Eli Brown, Kiran Kai, LeRoyce, lophiile, Monte Booker, Rascal, Renzell, Saba, Tae Beast, Tee-WaTT and Thelonious Martin. The album features guest appearances from Ben Hixon, Ayinde Cartman, and greenSLLIME.

== Music and lyrics ==
Jenkins explained the inspiration behind the song "Scottie Pippen", saying "Scottie Pippen never got the recognition he deserved when playing next to Michael Jordan. He is often relegated to just a sidekick, but he was just as important in those championship games as Mike. Sometimes no matter how hard we try we'll just be number two to some. And no matter how great the work is, it goes under appreciated." The song "Reflections" is about Jenkins' dealings with his father in the past 20 years. "Speed Racer" was created after a conversation with Saba about how they had drifted away from how close they used to be as friends. "Is, This Cigarettes" was based on an "idea that comes from an entire adulthood of perspectives and ideologies about the way that the world works, especially within the bounds of the internet."

== Singles ==
On October 8, 2021, Jenkins announced that his third album Elephant in the Room would be released on October 29. The first single, "Truffles", was released on June 23, 2021. This was followed by "Contacts", released on October 8 with the announcement of the official album release date and track list reveal. The album's final single "Scottie Pippen" was released on October 22.

== Critical reception ==
Professional ratings
Aggregate scores
Source	Rating
Metacritic	82/100
Review scores
Source	Rating
Clash	9/10
HipHopDX	3.4/5
Pitchfork	7.2/10
Under the Radar	8/10

Elephant in the Room was met with widespread acclaim from music critics. At Metacritic, which assigns a normalized rating out of 100 to reviews from mainstream publications, the album received an average score of 82, based on 6 reviews. Dean Van Nguyen of Pitchfork scored the album a 7.2 out of 10 saying the rapper "ditches the epic scope and thematic cohesion of those projects for something shorter and more scattered. By and large, he sticks to what has worked in the past: soft beats, jerky raps, intimate writing, and big-picture examination." Spin gave the album a positive review saying the album "lands somewhere between concept piece and exhibition, balancing an array of new and familiar styles. While navigating the emotional distance in his relationships, Jenkins explores and refines the technique that first launched him from the fertile ground of his hometown Chicago. Seven years after his breakthrough, he remains one of the best writers in the game—but rather than a big fish in a small pond, he’s only showing room for growth." Ben Brutocao of HipHopDX scored the album a 3.4 out of 5 saying "Jenkins showcases his artistic maturity by allowing himself to wander through subversively dense philosophical quandaries packaged neatly as coffee house jazz-hop."

== Track listing ==
Elephant in the Room track listing
No.	Title	Producer(s)	Length
1.	"The Valley of the Shadow of Death"	Tee-WaTT; Thelonious Martin; Renzell	3:01
2.	"Things You Could Die for If Doing While Black" (featuring Ben Hixon)	Renzell	3:02
3.	"Stiff Arm" (featuring Ayinde Cartman)	Renzell; Otto	3:29
4.	"Contacts"	Eli Brown; Tae Beast; Rascal	2:56
5.	"Scottie Pippen"	Kiran Kai	3:53
6.	"Gucci Tried to Tell Me"	lophiile	3:09
7.	"D.U.I." (featuring greenSLLIME)	Tee-WaTT	2:59
8.	"Speed Racer"	Saba	2:02
9.	"Truffles"	Renzell; Monte Booker	3:14
10.	"Is, This Cigarettes"	Tee-WaTT; LeRoyce	3:31
11.	"Reflection"	Renzell	3:43
12.	"Rug Burn" (featuring serpentwithfeet)	Tee-WaTT	3:14
Total length:			38:17
