= The Circus (EP) =

EP by Mick Jenkins
- Released: January 10, 2020
- Genre: Hip-hop
- Labels: Free Nation; Cinematic
- Producers: Beat Butcha; Bizness Boi; Black Milk; Chirashe; Coop The Truth; Da-P; DJ FU; Fortune; C.H.O.P.; Hit-Boy; IAMNOBODI; Martin $ky

Mick Jenkins chronology
Pieces of a Man (2018)	The Circus (2020)	Elephant in the Room (2021)

The Circus is an extended play by American rapper Mick Jenkins. It was released on January 10, 2020 via Free Nation and Cinematic Music Group. Composed of seven tracks, production was handled by eleven record producers, including Black Milk and Hit-Boy. It features a guest appearance from Atlanta-based hip-hop duo EarthGang.

== Singles and promotion ==
On January 3, 2020, "Carefree" produced by Black Milk was released, supported by a music video, as he announced the EP.

== Critical reception ==
Professional ratings
Aggregate scores
Source	Rating
Metacritic	78/100
Review scores
Source	Rating
Clash Music	8/10
Exclaim!	8/10
HipHopDX	3.9/5
NME	4/5 stars
Pitchfork	6.7/10

The Circus received generally positive reviews from critics. At Metacritic, which assigns a normalized rating out of 100 to reviews from mainstream publications, the album received an average score of 78, based on 5 reviews.

== Track listing ==
The Circus track listing
No.	Title	Producer(s)	Length
1.	"Same Ol"	Hit-Boy	2:10
2.	"Carefree"	Black Milk	3:10
3.	"The Light" (featuring EarthGang)	IAMNOBODI	4:24
4.	"Flaunt"	Da-P	2:21
5.	"The Fit"	Bizness Boi; Fortune; Coop The Truth	2:22
6.	"I'm Convinced"	DJ FU; C.H.O.P.; Beat Butcha	2:20
7.	"Different Scales"	Martin $ky; Chirashe	2:24
