= The Waters =

Mixtape by Mick Jenkins
- Released: August 12, 2014
- Genre: Hip-hop
- Length: 54:19
- Label: Cinematic
- Producers: Cam O'bi; Da P; DJ Dahi; Dream Koala; High Klassfied; J Money; Kirk Knight; OnGaud; Spacedtime; Statik Selektah; THEMpeople; THC; TJ Osinulu

Mick Jenkins chronology
Trees & Truths (2013)	The Waters (2014)	Waves (2015)

The Waters (stylized as The Water[s]) is the fourth mixtape by American rapper Mick Jenkins. It was released on August 12, 2014, by Cinematic Music Group.

== Background ==
The Waters is a concept mixtape. Throughout the album, he uses water to symbolize truth. The mixtape includes features by Pro Era member Joey Badass as well as The Mind, Noname, and Jean Deaux. Producers who contributed in the mixtape include Statik Selektah, Kirk Knight, OnGaud, Spacedtime, THEMpeople, THC, Dream Koala, DJ Dahi, High Klassfied, Da P, J Money, TJ Osinulu and Cam for J.U.S.T.I.C.E. League.

== Critical reception ==
Professional ratings
Review scores
Source	Rating
HipHopDX	4.0/5
Pitchfork	7.8/10
PopMatters	7/10
XXL	4/5

Nathan Stevens of PopMatters rated the mixtape a 7/10 saying "There's not really a bad song here, but next to monsters like "Jazz", "Martyrs", and "Jerome" some of the album feels like filler. When the album's main trio is composed of some of the best songs of the year, other tracks can't help but pale in comparison. Still, The Water(s) proves that Jenkins is as ambitious as he is talented. Saying that The Water(s) shows potential would be unfair. Jenkins has already arrived."

Steven Goldstein of HipHopDX gave the mixtape a positive review saying "The Water[s] is one of the most accomplished releases out of Chicago this year, but it's not sensitive to time or location. Rather, the 23-year-old Jenkins raps about longstanding issues that are both institutional and individual. He's keen to point out the bullshit that clouds our day-to-day, but more importantly, he readily admits when the solutions can't be found."

Michael Blair of XXL gave the mixtape a grand "XL", writing "The indisputable success that Mick has achieved in The Water[s], is not only confirmation that he is imperative to the progress of hip-hop within his specific region of the country, but most importantly, that he warrants recognition as a formidable opponent to some of hip-hop's most highly regarded MCs. Mick Jenkins' proverbial cup is currently filled with some of the purest water that the industry has to offer, and if you ask the fearless man who's holding it, he'll assure you that there is an eternal supply of it to come."

== Track listing ==
No.	Title	Producer(s)	Length
1.	"Shipwrecked" (featuring The Mind)	THEMpeople	4:21
2.	"THC"	THC	1:51
3.	"The Waters"	High Klassfied; Da P	4:13
4.	"Healer" (featuring Jean Deaux)	Dream Koala; OnGaud	4:15
5.	"Comfortable" (featuring Noname)	Cam O'bi	4:15
6.	"Vibe"	OnGaud	4:34
7.	"Jazz"	OnGaud	4:20
8.	"Black Sheep"	Statik Selektah	3:17
9.	"Drink More" (featuring Ebony)	Spacedtime	3:12
10.	"Canada Dry"	J Money; OnGaud	2:50
11.	"Who Else"	TJ Osinulu	3:35
12.	"Dehydration" (featuring The Mind)	DJ Dahi	3:39
13.	"514"	OnGaud	3:55
14.	"Martyrs"	OnGaud	3:39
15.	"Jerome" (featuring Joey Badass)	Kirk Knight	5:05
Total length:			54:19

Sample credits

- "Shipwrecked" contains a sample of "Supernatural", performed by KING.
- "THC" contains a sample of "Play", performed by iamamiwhoami.
- "Healer" contains a sample of "We Can't Be Friends", performed by Dream Koala.
- "Vibe" contains a sample of "The Sweetest Pain", performed by Dexter Wansel.
- "Jazz" contains a sample of "Toxic", performed by Yael Naim.
- "514" contains a sample of "Fog", performed by Nosaj Thing.
- "Martyrs" contains a sample of "Strange Fruit", performed by Carmen McRae.
- "Jerome" contains samples of "Testify", performed by Sounds of Blackness; and "Dead Wrong", performed by The Notorious B.I.G.
