= Noname (rapper) =

American rapper

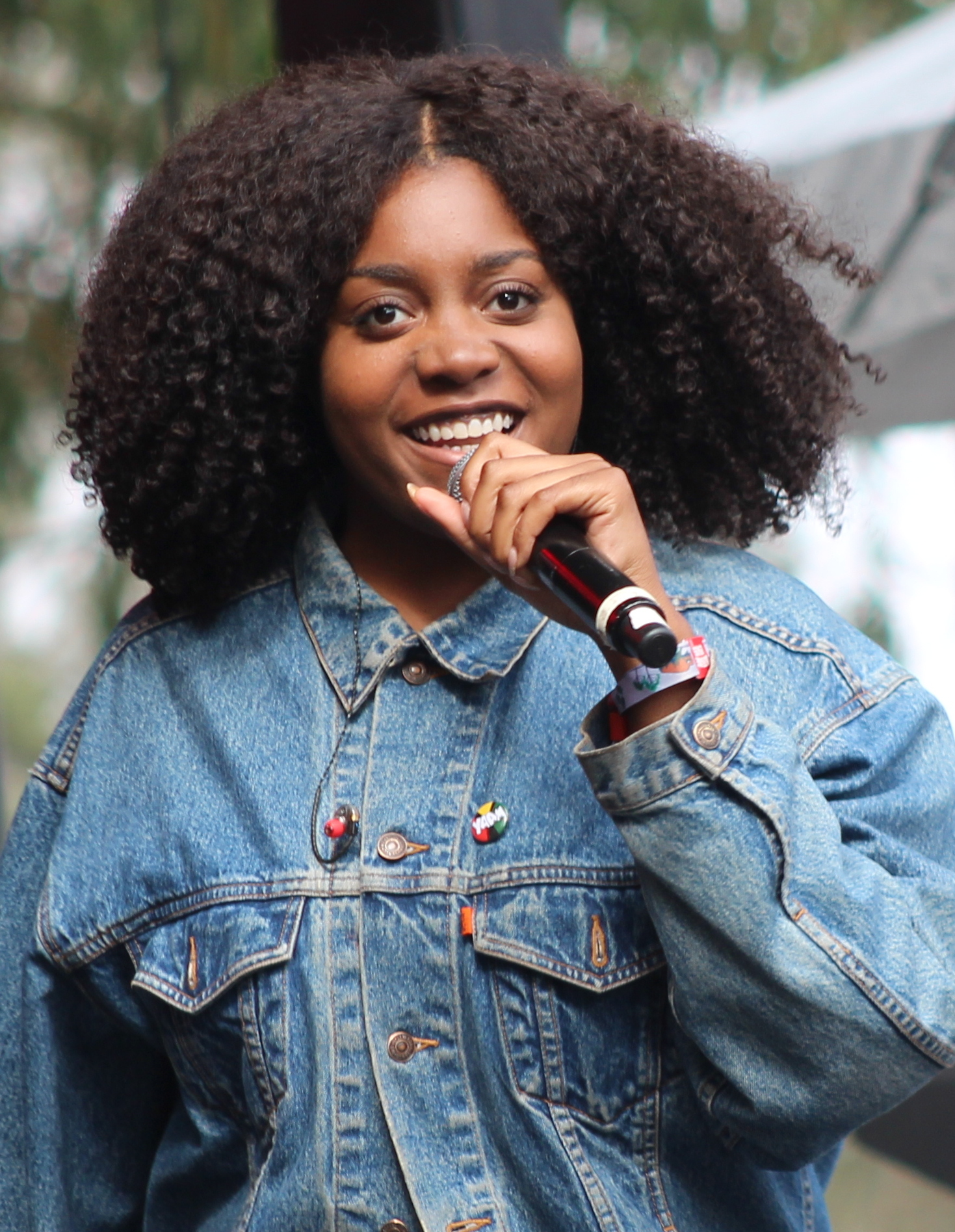
- Noname performing in 2017

Background information
- Born: Fatimah Nyeema Warner; September 18, 1991 (age 35); Chicago, Illinois, U.S.
- Genres: Hip hop; jazz rap; neo soul
- Occupations: Rapper; songwriter; poet
- Years active: 2010–present
- Member of: Ghetto Sage

Fatimah Nyeema Warner (born September 18, 1991), known professionally as Noname, is an American rapper. She began rapping and performing slam poetry in 2010, and gained wider recognition in 2013 for her appearance on the track "Lost" from Chance the Rapper's mixtape Acid Rap. She released her debut mixtape, Telefone, in 2016 to critical acclaim. Her debut album, Room 25, was released in 2018 and received further acclaim.

Noname is one third of the musical supergroup Ghetto Sage with rappers Smino and Saba. Since 2019, she has also run the Noname Book Club, which focuses on radical texts by authors of color.

== Early life ==
Noname grew up in the Bronzeville neighborhood of Chicago. She was raised by her grandparents until she was in middle school. Her grandparents were entrepreneurs, as was her mother, who owned an Afrocentric Bookstore. When she returned to live with her mother, she had a new sibling and she and her mother did not get along.

As a teenager, she listened to blues musicians Buddy Guy and Howlin' Wolf, and spent time in her mother's bookstore. She started writing poetry after taking a creative writing class in high school. As a teen, she spent time in the YOUMedia project, a space for young artists to create and network then based at the Harold Washington Library. There, she befriended local talents including Chance the Rapper. Experimental rapper LUCKI also attended the sessions.

== Career ==
=== 2010–2015: Early works ===
Noname's interest in poetry led her to compete in local open mics and slam poetry competitions; she took third place in Chicago's annual Louder Than a Bomb competition. Noname then started to freestyle rap with friends, collaborating with local Chicago artists including Chance the Rapper, Saba, and Mick Jenkins.

In 2013, she appeared on Chance the Rapper's second mixtape, Acid Rap, contributing a verse to the track "Lost" and singing the chorus. She later contributed a verse to the song "Finish Line/Drown" from Chance the Rapper's 2016 mixtape Coloring Book. In December 2016, she appeared with Chance the Rapper on Saturday Night Live. She announced her first tour on November 13, 2016.

In 2014, she was featured on Mick Jenkins's mixtape The Waters, contributing to the track "Comfortable". In 2015, she was featured on multiple tracks from Kirk Knight's album Late Knight Special. That year, she also featured on fellow Chicago rapper Ramaj Eroc's single "I Love You More".

=== 2016–2017: Telefone ===
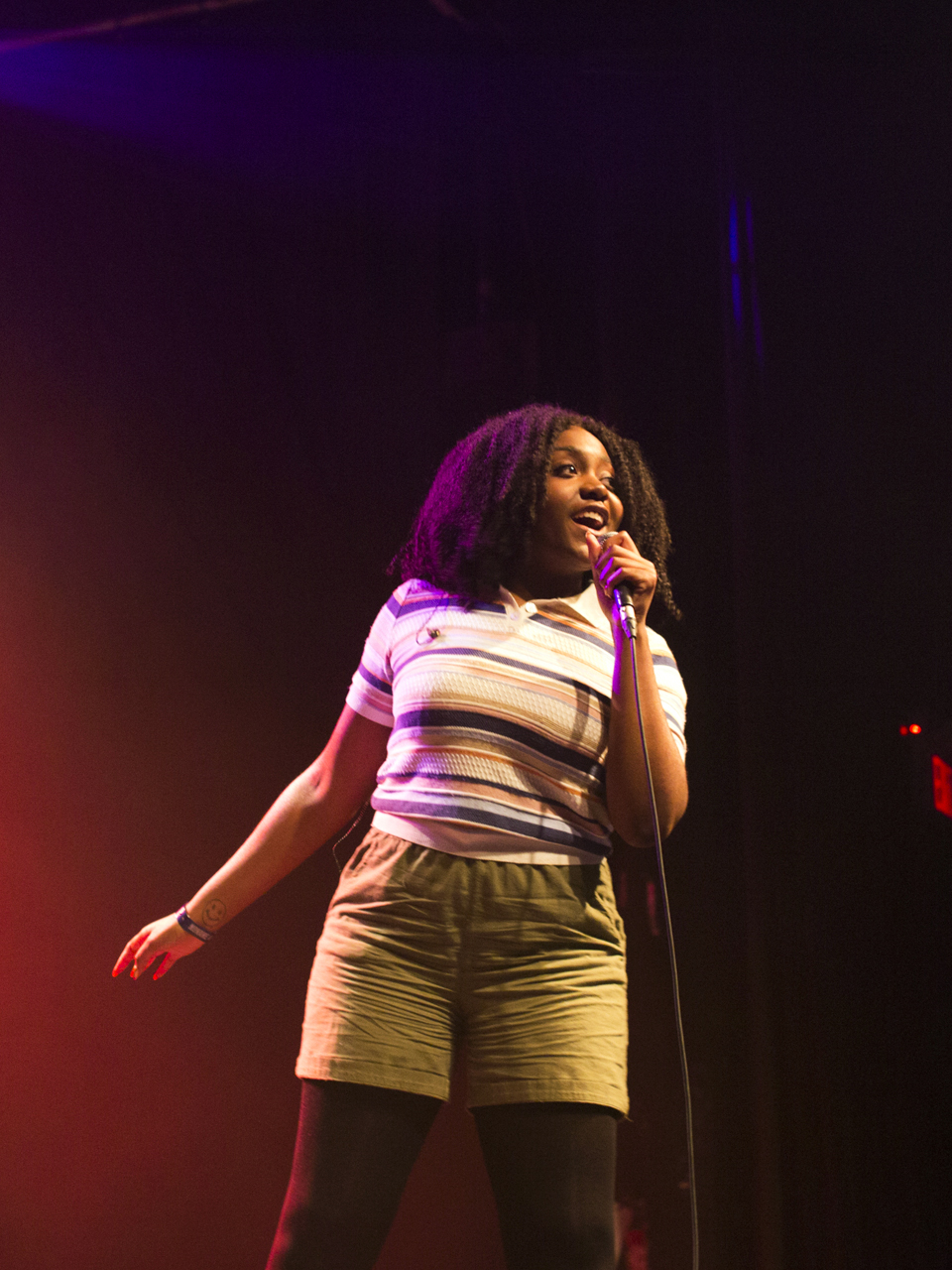
Noname on her Telefone tour in 2017

Noname first used the stage name "Noname Gypsy", which she chose as a teenager when she was transitioning from poetry to music, believing "gypsies were very nomadic, just not about staying in one space for a long time". In March 2016, she removed "Gypsy" from her stage name after learning of its racial connotation, saying she had been unaware of its negative connotations and did not want to offend Romani people. In a 2016 interview with The Fader, she explained her current stage name, following the change:

I try to exist without binding myself to labels. I’m not really into labels at all, even the way I dress; I usually don't wear anything with a name brand. For me, not having a name expands my creativity. I’m able to do anything. Noname could potentially be a nurse. Noname could be a screenwriter. I’m not limited to any one category of art or other existence, on a more existential level.

Noname released her first mixtape, Telefone, on July 31, 2016, after three years of production. Telefone publicized her new stage name through songs presented as open-ended telephone conversations. The album centers on important telephone conversations Noname has had. Her rap speaks of black women's pain and highlights the struggles of growing up in Chicago. The album was originally released as a free download on Bandcamp, and then on vinyl in September 2017. Rolling Stone called it some of 2016's "most thought-provoking hip-hop." Stereogum wrote that Noname possessed "a potency and urgency in her complicated, spoken word-esque cadences and subdued delivery that escapes many of her more animated peers." Consequence of Sound wrote that "the louder her music is played, the brighter her cadence glows, giving her lyrics a type of 3D craft that makes Telefone a diary of lessons too relevant to keep to yourself."

In October 2016, Noname and fellow Chicago resident Saba collaborated to produce "Church/Liquor Store", a song that explores the Westside of Chicago, where liquor stores sit directly next to places of worship. Noname critiques the gentrification of the neighborhood and the erasure of crime believed to accompany it.

Noname performed a NPR Tiny Desk Concert in April 2017.

=== 2018–2019: Room 25 ===
In August 2018, Noname announced that her second album, Room 25, would be released in fall 2018. The album, which took about a month to record, chronicles the two years since the release of Telefone, during which she moved from Chicago to Los Angeles and had a short romantic relationship.

Noname compared her maturity on Room 25 to Telefone, saying "Telefone was a very PG record because I was very PG. I just hadn't had sex." Unlike Telefone, Room 25 was created due to a financial obligation. Noname said in an interview, "It came to a point where it was, like, I needed to make an album because I need to pay my rent. I could've done another Telefone tour, but I can't play those songs anymore. Like, I could, but I physically hate it because I've just been playing them for so long." Noname paid for the entire album herself using money from touring and guest appearances on Chance the Rapper projects.

The album was released on September 14, 2018. El Hunt of NME called the album "flawless" and "smartly constructed and laced with intricate subtlety." Rolling Stone said Noname was "One of the best rappers alive" and included her on a list of "Artists You Need to Know". Pitchfork designated Room 25 as "Best New Music" and wrote that it is "a transcendent coming-of-age tale built around cosmic jazz and neo-soul, delivered by a woman deeply invested in her interiority and that of the world around her." PopMatters said the album was "vintage neo-soul and future rap hand in hand; a soulful sanctuary for those turned off by the austerity of mainstream mumble rap". Noname performed a three-song medley of "Blaxploitation," "Prayer Song," and "Don't Forget About Me" from the album in her solo television debut on The Late Show with Stephen Colbert on October 17, 2018.

=== 2019–present: Factory Baby, hiatus, and Sundial ===
On May 15, 2019, Noname announced that her upcoming second studio album would be titled Factory Baby. She also formed the trio Ghetto Sage with Smino and Saba.

In 2020, she stated that her music career was on pause to focus on education and her book club.

On June 18, 2020, two days after J. Cole had seemingly criticized her activism in his song "Snow on tha Bluff", Noname released the Madlib-produced "Song 33", in which she alluded to Cole and reflected on violence against black women, mainly the death of 19-year-old Black Lives Matter activist Oluwatoyin Salau. She expressed regret at responding to Cole, saying that although she had tried to "use it as a moment to draw attention back to the issues" she cares about, she apologized "for any further distraction this caused." She did not take the song down, instead donating all proceeds to black mutual aid funds.

On August 7, 2020, Noname appeared on a remix to Anderson Paak's "Lockdown", along with JID and Jay Rock. In February 2021, she revealed she had turned down an offer to be on the soundtrack for Judas and the Black Messiah after seeing the film, criticizing the film for not centering Fred Hampton's "radical communist politics".

In May 2021, Noname was one of more than 600 musicians who signed an open letter calling for a boycott of performances in Israel until they end the occupation of the Palestinian territories.

On December 5, 2021, Noname announced on Instagram that her album Factory Baby, originally due to be released in 2021, had been canceled and that she would be taking an indefinite hiatus from music.

In March 2022, Pitchfork announced that Noname would be performing at the 2022 Pitchfork Music Festival in Chicago that July. The next day, she posted a photo of her home studio to Instagram with the caption "maybe 30 is too young to retire". The next month, she was announced as part of the 2022 Afropunk Festival lineup and said that she would be releasing an album after "play[ing] a few shows".

In January 2023, the Coachella 2023 lineup was revealed, with Noname scheduled to perform at the festival. That April, she announced that her second studio album, titled Sundial, would release in July 2023.

On July 13, she announced that the lead single "Balloons" featuring Jay Electronica and Eryn Allen Kane would be released on July 21. She received criticism for featuring Electronica, who has been accused of antisemitism due to his affiliation with Louis Farrakhan, an antisemitic black supremacist and the leader of the Nation of Islam, and his support for Kanye West in the midst of a series of antisemitic remarks made by West. In response, Noname posted a series of tweets defending Electronica and her decision to collaborate with him before suggesting that Sundial may not be released. Two days later, she deleted her Twitter account.

Days after the controversy, Noname shared the album's tracklist and pushed the release date back to August 11, 2023, while deciding to no longer release "Balloons" as a single. The album was released to positive reviews; however, Electronica's verse, which was accused of antisemitism, was a source of continued controversy. In an Instagram story, Noname refused to apologize for the inclusion of the verse, stating "I'm not going to apologize for a verse I didn't write" and that "your disappointment truly means absolutely nothing to me and I say that with love".

After the album's release, she held a block party in Chicago on August 17, 2023, where she performed along with Navy Blue and Alex Vaughn.

== Noname Book Club ==
In July 2019, Noname created a book club. She came up with the idea after a fan commented on her post on X (formerly Twitter) that they were reading the same book as her, Jackson Rising, about Cooperation Jackson. The book club encourages support of locally owned bookstores, with her website providing a directory of bookstores owned by people of color. The club has also partnered with local libraries across the country to increase the circulation and accessibility of these books. Noname described the book club as "a little bit of a fuck you to Amazon, and kind of a fuck you to the FBI," referencing how the FBI's COINTELPRO program had targeted Black independent booksellers. The book club has partnerships with libraries in Oakland, Chicago, New York, and Los Angeles, where the libraries promote and help readers find the chosen books. It also hosts discussions on the literature and donates books to prisons, sending books to over 400 facilities as of 2023.

The book club chooses two books a month. The first two books chosen were Pedagogy of the Oppressed by Paulo Freire and We Are Never Meeting in Real Life by Samantha Irby. Celebrities sometimes choose a book, including Kehlani (choosing Parable of the Sower by Octavia E. Butler) and Earl Sweatshirt (choosing Faces & Masks (Memory of Fire, Vol. 2) by Eduardo Galeano). The book club aims to provide a "radical curated book list" and has been described by Vogue as focusing on "anti-capitalist and radical leftist literature".

In January 2020, Noname created "Library Card Registration Day" asking people to go to their local libraries on January 11 and register for a library card. She called the day "basically an 'F you' to major corporations who have privatized the way we consume goods and services," specifically referencing how her mother's bookstore had closed due to Amazon. Noname also called for her followers to end their subscriptions with Amazon, tweeting that Amazon had "created a consumer model that is extremely addictive and removes human compassion. We don’t think about the workers who are underpaid and exploited. We just want our next-day delivery."

In March 2021, Noname revealed on her Instagram story that work on a physical headquarters for Noname Book Club had begun, which would act as a center for political education classes, book drives, a library, food drives, book club meet-ups, tent drives, free art shows, free movie screenings, and more. In April 2021, Haymarket Books donated 180 titles to the book club's personal collection of reading material, which Noname called a "radical community library."

== Influences ==
Musically and stylistically, Noname has credited Avril Lavigne, Nina Simone, André 3000, and Missy Elliott as her influences. She cites the author Toni Morrison and poet Patricia Smith as notable influences on her writing style. Her most recent work revolves around themes of social injustices, inspired by anti-capitalist theories.

== Comments on her fanbase ==
In November 2019, Noname announced she was considering quitting music and expressed frustration with her predominantly white audience. She went on to say that the demographics of her fanbase made her want to quit music: "I refuse to keep making music and putting it online for free for people who won’t support me. If y'all don't wanna leave the crib I feel it. I don't want to dance on a stage for white people."

== Discography ==
=== Studio albums ===
List of studio albums, with selected details
Title	Album details
Room 25	Released: September 14, 2018; Label: Self-released; Format: Digital download, vinyl
Sundial	Released: August 11, 2023; Label: Self-released; Format: Digital download, vinyl

=== Mixtape ===
Title	Album details
Telefone	Released: July 31, 2016; Label: Self-released; Format: Digital download, vinyl

=== Singles ===
List of singles, with year released and album name shown
Title	Year	Album
"Song 31" (featuring Phoelix)	2019	Non-album singles
"Song 32"	2019	Non-album singles
"Häagen Dazs" (as Ghetto Sage, with Saba and Smino)	2019	Non-album singles
"Song 33"	2020	Non-album singles
"Rainforest"	2021	Non-album singles

=== Guest appearances ===
List of non-single guest appearances, with other performing artists, showing year released and album name
Title	Year	Artist(s)	Album
"The Truth"	2013	Mick Jenkins	Trees & Truths
"Lost"	2013	Chance the Rapper	Acid Rap
"Touchdown"	2013	John Walt	Get Happy 2.0
"All Love"	2014	C-Sick, Taylor Bennett, Nick Astro	La Collection
"Comfortable"	2014	Mick Jenkins	The Water[s]
"Future Plans Pt. III"	2014	Woo Park	Smokes
"Food for Thought"	2015	IKON, Saba, Malcolm London, Anthony Pavel	Private Stock
"Warm Enough"	2015	Donnie Trumpet & the Social Experiment, J. Cole	Surf
"I Love You More"	2015	Ramaj Eroc	—N/a
"Israel (Sparring)"	2015	Chance the Rapper	—N/a
"Last Dance"	2015	Chance the Rapper, Lil B	Free (Based Freestyles Mixtape)
"Dead Friends"	2015	Kirk Knight, Thundercat	Late Knight Special
"I Had Music"	2016	Mont Jake	Shadow
"Finish Line / Drown"	2016	Chance the Rapper, T-Pain, Kirk Franklin, Eryn Allen Kane	Coloring Book
"Only the Beginning"	2016	theMIND	Summer Camp
"VRY BLK"	2016	Jamila Woods	Heavn
"Into You"	2016	Jesse Boykins III	Bartholomew
"Angles"	2016	Mick Jenkins, Xavier Omär	The Healing Component
"Church / Liquor Store"	2016	Saba	Bucket List Project
"Counterfeit"	2016	Phoelix, Chelsea Reject, Saba	Countdown 2 Midnight
"The Tragedy"	2016	Jeremih, Chance the Rapper	Merry Christmas Lil' Mama
"Amphetamine"	2017	Smino	blkswn
"Kale"	2017	Joseph Chilliams, Supa Bwe	Henry Church
"For A Reason"	2018	Tennis Shoes	Breakfast
