= Mick Jenkins =

American rapper (born 1991)

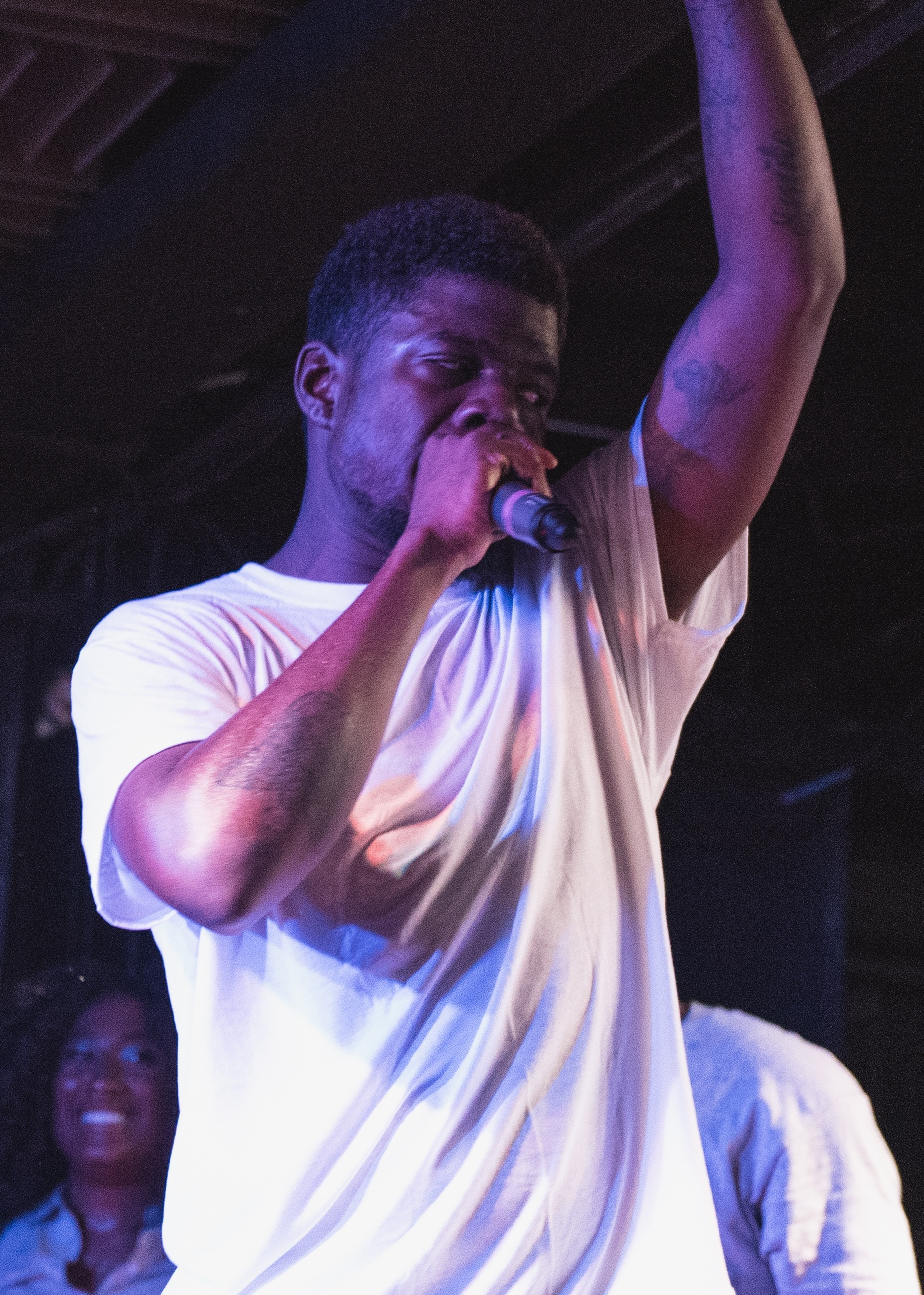
- Jenkins performing in 2016

Background information
- Born: Jayson Andrew Jenkins; April 16, 1991 (age 35); Huntsville, Alabama, U.S.
- Origin: Chicago, Illinois, U.S.
- Genres: Hip-hop
- Occupations: Rapper; songwriter; record producer
- Years active: 2011–present
- Labels: Cinematic; Free Nation; RBC; BMG
- Spouse: Kendra Kash (m. 2020)

Jayson Andrew "Mick" Jenkins (born April 16, 1991) is an American rapper based in Chicago and signed to Cinematic Music Group.

== Early life and education ==
Jenkins was born in Huntsville, Alabama. Following his parents divorce, he moved to Chicago, Illinois with his mother and sister when he was nine years old. As a child, Jenkins was heavily influenced by his parents' musical preferences. His mother listened to Neo-soul, while his father enjoyed contemporary black gospel music. When Jenkins was just 17 years old, he began going to open-mic events at Young Chicago Authors, which engages young writers. Mick Jenkins attended Hirsch Metropolitan High, where he began participating in mock trials for the school's law academy in 2008. Following this opportunity, he went on to become a courthouse intern at the Dirksen Federal Building in Chicago. Jenkins ended his law studies in 2009, when he became an intern at Sir & Madame, a clothing store, and briefly became an aspiring fashion mogul. Later in 2009, he returned to Huntsville to attend Oakwood University, and later served 34 days for a misdemeanour charge. Oakwood is a private college that is affiliated with the Seventh Day Adventist Church. In Jenkins's sophomore year at the school, he entered a rap competition, where the prize was a pair of Beats By Dre headphones. Jenkins did not win the competition, but states that it led him to discover a passion in making music. Jenkins ultimately dropped out of Oakwood after his father lost his job at the school, meaning tuition was no longer affordable. Jenkins claims to have dropped five mixtapes while in college, though he later disregarded them and removed them from internet access. The Mickstape and The Pursuit of HappyNess: The Story of MickalasCage, however, are still available. In 2012, Jenkins pleaded guilty to a misdemeanor charge for possession of marijuana. He consequently served 34 days in jail in Alabama, before returning to Chicago to focus on music.

== Career ==
=== 2012–2013: Career beginnings, Trees & Truths, and mixtapes ===
On January 13, 2012, Jenkins released his first official mixtape, The Mickstape, followed by The Pursuit of HappyNess: The Story of Mickalascage in August 2012. These consecutive mixtapes included involvement from several record producers, such as After the Smoke, Swisha House, Chris Calor, Quincy Banks, Chuck Inglish, Vanilla, and Dijon, among others. During 2012, Jenkins returned to Chicago and joined the YCA (Young Chicago Authors), poetry collective, where he performed his first a cappella verse. This resulted in attention from local recording artist, and a leader of Chicago's Pivot Gang collective, Saba. The two then collaborated on a track called "Heaux", which was meant for a Mick Jenkins project, but ended up featuring on Saba's mixtape GETCOMFORTable (2012). Jenkins also became a member of a hip-hop group, called Free Nation. Other members include Prop, J-Stock, Burman, and Maine The Saint. Free Nation is "a hip hop group that promotes creative thought without accepting narrow views imposed by the powers that be".

In April 2013, Jenkins released his Trees & Truths mixtape. The tape quickly became a local favorite, featuring acid jazz-influenced production, biblical allegory, and his lacerating lyricism. Only few months after its release, a collaboration between him and fellow Chicago rappers Chance The Rapper and Vic Mensa came in the form of the single "Crossroads", which garnered both attention and praise.

=== 2014–2015: The Waters and Waves ===
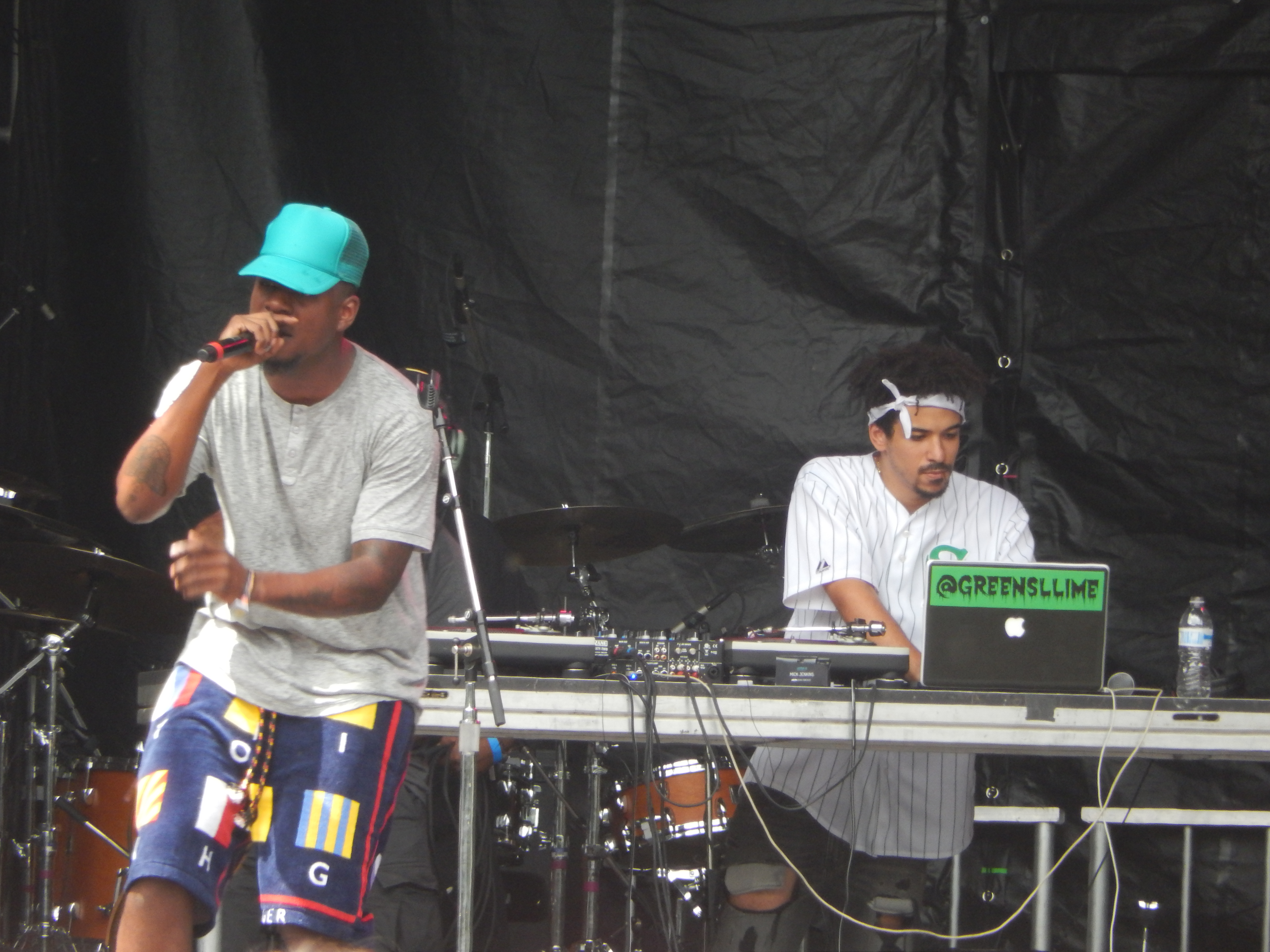
Jenkins (left) in 2015

In July 2014, Jenkins received significant attention after the release of his single and a visual of "Martyrs", which juxtaposed insight on harsh societal truths with a catchy hook. The thought-provoking single held messages on gun violence, the fight between his conscience and new-found success, and his turbulent childhood in Chicago. "Martyrs" led prominent figures in the hip-hop community such as Timbaland, to reach out and praise Jenkins for his musical talent and intricate lyricism. On August 12, Jenkins released his project, The Waters, to critical acclaim. Considered by many to be Jenkins' breakout project, The Waters is centered on the idea of comparing water to life's truths. Shortly after releasing the project, Jenkins announced he would be touring during the fall on the 2014 Smoker's Club World Wide Roller's Tour alongside Method Man, Redman, B-Real, Trademark da Skydiver, and Berner. His first official tour took place in February 2015 with Kirk Knight, Noname and Saba. He also joined Joey Bada$$ and Denzel Curry for Phase 1 of their World Domination Tour.

On July 20, 2015, Mick Jenkins announced his Waves EP, which was released on August 21, 2015. Mick Jenkins began streaming his new project in full via NPR's First Listen on August 13, 2015. Waves is the follow-up to Jenkins' critically acclaimed 2014 mixtape, The Waters. Jenkins kept the collaborators on Waves confined to those within his inner circle. The project features the likes of Jean Deaux, Saba, TheMind and popular producers such as Kaytranada. Jenkins also accompanied French producer STWO on his North American tour from the end of August through the beginning of October.

=== 2016: The Healing Component ===
On August 17, 2016, Mick Jenkins released the first single from his highly anticipated debut album, "Spread Love". On August 25, 2016, Jenkins released his second single of the album, called "Drowning", which features an instrumental performed by Toronto-based jazz quartet BADBADNOTGOOD. The song has a direct reference to the death of Eric Garner, a black man who was strangled by police. The album, The Healing Component, was released on September 23, 2016. Many of the songs on the albums feature intros and outros with a dialogue about love with a female narrator, his sister. The Healing Component, abbreviated THC, explores the theme of love throughout the album. From self-love to romantic experience, he juxtaposes different forms love can take.

=== 2017–2020: Or More EP series, Pieces of a Man and The Circus ===
On November 21, 2017, Mick Jenkins released Or More; The Anxious, the first mixtape in a series of projects Jenkins describes as "a project series involving musical ideas and concepts that are currently inspiring the album's creation process." The second mixtape in the series, Or More; The Frustration, was released on February 24, 2018. On October 26, his second studio album, Pieces of a Man, was released. The album's first single, "Understood" was released on October 12, 2018. The second single "Padded Locks", featuring veteran Wu-Tang Clan member Ghostface Killah, was released on October 21, 2018. The album also prominently pays homage to Gil Scott-Heron's 1971 album of the same name.

In March 2019, Jenkins was featured on the single "Cold" with Brooklyn Michelle. Additionally later in the year on September 18, Jenkins released the single "Percy" featuring fellow Chicago-based rapper Qari produced by greenSLLIME, also from Chicago.

On January 3, 2020, he released the single "Carefree" from the EP The Circus, released on January 10, 2020.

=== 2021: Elephant in the Room ===
On October 8, 2021, Mick Jenkins announced his anticipated third album titled Elephant in the Room, which was released on October 29. The first single, "Truffles" was released on June 23, 2021. This was followed by "Contacts", released on October 8 with the announcement of the official album release date and track list reveal. The album's final single "Scottie Pippen" was released on October 22.

=== 2023-2024: The Patience ===
On July 7, 2023, Jenkins announced his fourth album The Patience, releasing the JID-assisted lead single "Smoke Break-Dance" on the same day. The album would mark his first release away from Cinematic Music Group, now releasing in collaboration with RBC Records and BMG. The album's second single, "Guapanese" released on July 28, 2023. In June 2024, Jenkins was featured on Indian rap duo Seedhe Maut's single "Bure Din".

=== 2025: type shit, Scarecrows and A Murder of Crows ===
On January 16, 2025, Jenkins released the EP type shit, exclusively on the online music platform EVEN. The EP would see Jenkins rap over "type beats" that he found on YouTube, and he explained the process behind the release, noting the underpayments that artists get from music streaming platforms. He would also mark this as the start of his "next phase in music", promising more music and content to arrive throughout 2025. Seven months later, Jenkins released the two-track single Scarecrows, consisting of respective collaborations with Smino and Ab-Soul.

On September 19, 2025, Jenkins released his fifth album A Murder of Crows, in collaboration with British producer Emil, exclusively on EVEN. Supported by the singles "Coco Gauff" and the Enny-assisted "Words I Should've Said", the album would later be released on streaming platforms two weeks later on October 3.

== Discography ==
=== Studio albums ===
List of albums, with album details and selected chart positions
Title	Album details	Peak chart positions		
Title	Album details	US	US R&B/HH	US Rap
The Healing Component	Released: September 23, 2016; Label: Cinematic; Format: LP, digital download, streaming	110	9	6
Pieces of a Man	Released: October 26, 2018; Label: Cinematic; Format: Digital download, streaming	—	—	—
Elephant in the Room	Released: October 29, 2021; Label: Free Nation, Cinematic; Format: Digital download, streaming	—	—	—
The Patience	Released: August 18, 2023; Label: RBC / BMG; Format: CD, LP, digital download, streaming	-	-	-
A Murder of Crows (with Emil)	Released: September 19, 2025; Label: Self-released; Format: digital download, streaming	-	-	-

=== EPs ===
Title	EP details
Wave[s]	Released: August 21, 2015; Format: LP, digital download, streaming
Or More; The Anxious	Released: November 22, 2017; Format: digital download
Or More... The Frustration	Released: February 24, 2018; Format: digital download
The Circus	Released: January 10, 2020; Format: digital download, streaming
type shit	Released: January 16, 2025; Format: digital download

=== Mixtapes ===
Title	Album details
The Mickstape	Released: January 13, 2012; Format: Digital download
The Pursuit of HappyNess: The Story of Mickalascage.	Released: August 5, 2012; Format: Digital download
Trees & Truths	Released: April 25, 2013; Format: Digital download
The Water[s]	Released: August 12, 2014; Format: LP, digital download, streaming

=== Singles ===
List of singles, with showing year released, and album name
Title	Year	Album
"Spread Love"	2016	The Healing Component
"Drowning" (featuring BadBadNotGood)	2016	The Healing Component
"Cool" (with Alex Wiley and Calez)	2018	Non-album singles
"Bruce Banner"	2018	Non-album singles
"What Am I to Do"	2018	Non-album singles
"Understood"	2018	Pieces of a Man
"frontstreet"	2020	Non-album single
"Truffles"	2021	Elephant in the Room
"Contacts"	2021	Elephant in the Room
"Scottie Pippen"	2021	Elephant in the Room
"Smoke Break-Dance" (featuring JID)	2023	The Patience
"Guapanese"	2023	The Patience
