= Robert G. Lee =

- Education: Brown University
- Employer: Brown University
- Notable work: Dear Miye, Letters Home from Japan 1939-1946 (1995); Orientals: Asian Americans in Popular Culture (1999)
- Title: Professor

Robert George Lee is an associate professor emeritus of American Studies at Brown University. He has authored key texts in Asian American Studies and, nominated by his current and former students and his colleagues, was awarded the Association for Asian American Studies' Lifetime Achievement Award in 2020.

== Biography ==
Lee received his Bachelor of Arts from the University of the Pacific in 1969, his Master of Arts from the University of California, Berkeley in 1971, and then a Ph.D. in History from Brown University in 1980.

Shortly after receiving his Ph.D., Lee was appointed the director of the Third World Center at Brown (now the Brown Center for Students of Color), a center that is now dedicated to the general support of students of color. His appointment began in 1981, and during his time Lee focused on helping students of color expand their career choices. Lee served as the director of the Third World Center until 1985. From 1986 to 1990, Lee served as Associate Dean of the college, associate director of the Center for the Study of Race and Ethnicity in America, and Adjunct Lecturer in the Department of American Civilization (now American Studies). In 1990, he was appointed as assistant professor in American Civilization and as associate professor in 1997. He served as Chair of the Department of American Civilization from 2009 to 2013.

== Academic work ==
Professor Lee's interest lies in the history of Asians in the United States, specifically the racial formation of Chinese immigrants and their American-born offspring. Lee explores the ways in which Chinese Americans invented Chinese-American identity and informal citizenship through social, cultural, and political institutions. More recently, he has begun a study of vernacular photography and the self-representation of Chinese in America in the early to mid-20th century, as well as examining transpacific popular culture and social movements, including the transmission of food, martial arts, and visual cultures.

Lee has written about these interests as an author of several books and as an editor for others.

Historian Roger Daniels explains that Dear Miye, Letters Home from Japan 1939-1946, in which Lee was the editor, "opens a window into a little-known aspect of the Nisei experience during World War II: that of the Japanese Americans who were, for one reason or another, resident in Japan during the war." Daniels lightly critiques Lee for not having "a firmer editorial hand" and for not providing enough editorial annotation at times; however, he compliments Lee for his "competent, unobtrusive job of editing."

Historian Timothy A. Hickman praises the way in which Lee uses popular culture in Orientals: Asian Americans in Popular Culture to explore the social construction of the "Oriental" in terms of race and class. Hickman writes, "This is an impressive and much needed analysis. Its influence will register in studies of Asian Americans, popular culture, race and gender." Yet, Hickman is concerned that Lee's analysis could just "[boil] down to reductive assertions of false consciousness" due to Lee's "insistence that popular culture is... rooted in economic relations." Historian David Roediger cannot stop praising the book and declares, "Because it engages so many critical debates, this brilliant and highly compressed book almost defies brief review." Scott H. Tang is also impressed with Lee's Orientals, but highlights a potential weakness in "the brief treatment of the thirties and forties."

Historian Daniel E. Bender commends the collection Race, Nation and Empire in American History, edited by Lee alongside James T. Campbell and Matthew Pratt Guterl. Bender asserts that "the book suggests new models of collaboration that address an ongoing crisis in edited collection publishing," its "cohesiveness" defined by its "complexity."

== Awards ==
Lee has received the following awards for his work:

- Dear Miye, Letters Home from Japan received a Special Book Award from the Association for Asian American Studies.
- Orientals: Asian Americans in Popular Culture received three Best Book awards from the Northeast Popular Culture/American Culture Association, the American Political Science Association, and the American Studies Association. This book also received an honorable mention for the John Hope Franklin Prize for Best Book in American Studies, given by the American Studies Association.
- Association for Asian American Studies' Lifetime Achievement Award (2020)

In 2007, Lee helped compile a volume of conference papers called Race, Nation and Empire in American History with James T. Campbell and Matthew Pratt Guterl. This compilation examined American empire, nationalism and foreign policy.

Lee was awarded a Fulbright for the 2013–2014 academic year at the Research Institute for the Humanities, Chinese University of Hong Kong. While there he developed, with his colleague Professor Evelyn Hu-Dehart, a graduate seminar on “Transpacific History” taught in real time between Brown and the Chinese University of Hong Kong (and subsequently with the Nanyang Technological University, Singapore). Professor Lee wrote about his most recent research, a large project that traces his family's photos in “Against Invisibility: Asian American Family Photographs and Public Humanities.” The essay appeared in a new anthology, Doing Public Humanities (edited by Susan Smulyan), and was completed while Lee was a fellow at the John Nicholas Brown Center for Public Humanities and Cultural Heritage at Brown University.

== Selected publications ==
- “Against Invisibility” in Doing Public Humanities (edited by Susan Smulyan) (2020)
- Race, Nation and Empire in American History, edited with James T. Campbell and Matthew Pratt Guterl (2007)
- Displacements and Diasporas: Asians in the Americas, edited with Wanni Anderson (2005)
- Orientals: Asian Americans in Popular Culture (1999)
- Dear Miye, Letters Home from Japan 1939-1946, editor (1995)
