= James T. Campbell =

American historian

James T. Campbell is an American historian. He is a professor of history at Stanford University.

== Career ==
Campbell graduated from Yale University, in 1980 with a B.A degree and in 1983 with an M.A., and from Stanford University, with a Ph.D. in 1989. He is a professor at Stanford University, and formerly taught at Northwestern University and Brown University. He was denied tenure from Northwestern, before joining the faculty at Stanford. Campbell collaborated with Susan Smulyan of Brown, and Ernie Limbo of Tougaloo College in creating the "Freedom Now!" website.

=== Reception of his work ===
In a review for The New York Times, Campbell's 2006 work Middle Passages is described by Raymond Arsenault as an "episodic book of interlocking stories" that explores the complex and often bittersweet experiences of African Americans who journeyed to Africa over two centuries. The reviewer praises Campbell's engaging narrative and his ability to illuminate the complexities of national identity and race through the stories of a diverse cast of characters. The review highlights Campbell's balanced approach, noting that he avoids romanticizing Africa or its visitors and instead presents a nuanced portrait of the continent and its relationship with African Americans throughout history. Arsenault also focuses on Campbell's description of Langston Hughes, stating: "As Campbell later shows in an informative chapter on Africa and the Harlem Renaissance, Hughes managed to recover from his initial disappointment [at being perceived as white by the Africans he encountered], adopting a more realistic appreciation of the limitations of both his 'African' identity and African virtue."

== Views ==
In a 2020 interview after the murder of George Floyd and ensuing unrest, Campbell, who is white, voiced his belief that periods of increased attention to racial injustice, as in 2020, have historically been followed by white backlash driven by a sense of grievance and fear of losing power. Campbell further emphasized what he sees as the role of narratives in shaping these reactions, citing the rewriting of Civil War history to portray regular white Southerners as victims and downplay the central role of slavery. He also points out the enduring appeal of states' rights arguments, and highlighted how historically both sides of the slavery debate used states' rights arguments to their advantage, demonstrating the opportunistic and situational nature of these arguments.

== Awards ==
- 1992: National Endowment for the Humanities summer stipend
- 1992–1993: Fulbright African Regional Research Fellowship,
- 1996: Carl Sandburg Literary Award for Non-Fiction for Songs of Zion
- 1996: Frederick Jackson Turner Award, Organization of American Historians, for Songs of Zion: The A.M.E. Church in the United States and South Africa
- 2000–2001: Charles Warren Center for American History Fellow, Harvard University
- 2003–2004: Center for the Comparative Study of Race and Ethnicity Fellow, Stanford University
- 2007: Mark Lynton History Prize for Middle Passages: African American Journeys to Africa, 1787-2005
- 2020: Guggenheim Fellowship

== Works ==
- Songs of Zion: The A.M.E. Church in the United States and South Africa. UNC Press. 1998. ISBN 978-0-8078-4711-4.
- Middle Passages: African American Journeys to Africa, 1787-2005. Penguin Group. 2007. ISBN 978-0-14-311198-6.. (Penguin History of American Life series)
- James T. Campbell; Matthew Pratt Guterl; Robert G. Lee, eds. (August 29, 2007). Race, Nation, and Empire in American History. The University of North Carolina Press. ISBN 978-0-8078-5828-8. (paperback edition)
- Leslie M. Harris; James T. Campbell; Alfred L. Brophy, eds. (2019). Slavery and the University - Histories and Legacies. The University of Georgia Press. ISBN 978-0-8203-5443-9.
