= Concept album =

Album that tells a self-contained story

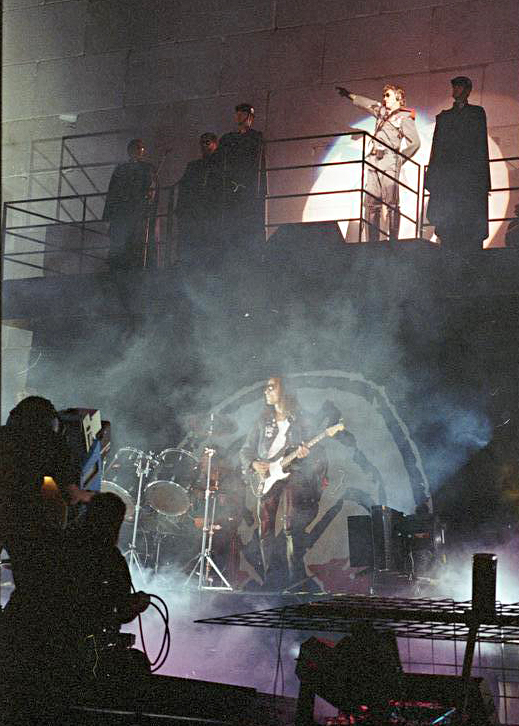
Roger Waters (saluting on top) leading a live performance of Pink Floyd's The Wall, one of the best-known concept albums of all time

A concept album is a musical album whose tracks hold a larger purpose or meaning collectively than they do individually. This is typically achieved through a single central narrative or theme, which can be instrumental, compositional, or lyrical. Alternatively, the term may signify an album that lacks any explicit musical or lyrical motif, but is considered to be of "uniform excellence". Music critics remain divided on the precise definition of a concept album.

The format is often stated to have begun with folk singer Woody Guthrie's Dust Bowl Ballads (1940) and was subsequently popularized by traditional pop singer Frank Sinatra's 1940s–50s string of albums centered around a given theme. However, the term is most closely associated with rock music from the 1960s and afterwards. In the 1960s, various rock bands released several well-regarded concept albums, eventually leading to the birth of the rock opera.

== Definitions ==
There is no clear definition of a "concept album". Fiona Sturges of The Independent stated that the concept album "was originally defined as a long-player where the songs were based on one dramatic idea – but the term is subjective." A precursor to this type of album can be found in the 19th-century song cycle, which ran into similar difficulties in classification. The extremely broad definitions of a "concept album" could potentially encompass all soundtracks, compilations, cast recordings, greatest hits albums, tribute albums, Christmas albums, and live albums.

The most common definitions refer to an expanded approach to a rock album (as a story, play, or opus), or a project that either revolves around a specific theme or a collection of related materials. AllMusic writes, "A concept album could be a collection of songs by an individual songwriter or a particular theme – these are the concept LPs that reigned in the '50s ... the phrase 'concept album' is inextricably tied to the late 1960s, when rock & rollers began stretching the limits of their art form." Author Jim Cullen describes it as "a collection of discrete but thematically unified songs whose whole is greater than the sum of its parts ... sometimes [erroneously] assumed to be a product of the rock era." Author Roy Shuker defines concept albums and rock operas as albums that are "unified by a theme, which can be instrumental, compositional, narrative, or lyrical. ... In this form, the album changed from a collection of heterogeneous songs into a narrative work with a single theme, in which individual songs segue into one another."

Speaking of concepts in albums during the 1970s, Robert Christgau wrote in Christgau's Record Guide: Rock Albums of the Seventies (1981), because "overall impression" of an album matters, "concept intensifies the impact" of certain albums "in more or less the way Sgt. Pepper intended", as well as "a species of concept that pushes a rhythmically unrelenting album like The Wild Magnolias or a vocally irresistible one like Shirley Brown's Woman to Woman, to a deeper level of significance."

== History ==
=== 1940s–50s: Origins ===
In the 2016 BBC documentary When Pop Went Epic: The Crazy World of the Concept Album, it is suggested that the first concept album is Woody Guthrie's 1940 album Dust Bowl Ballads. The Independent regards it as "perhaps" one of the first concept albums, consisting exclusively of semi-autobiographical songs about the hardships of American migrant labourers during the 1930s. In 1948, the first commercially successful LP record was introduced. These LP records had higher quality sound, and up to 25 minutes per side of a record. With close to one hour listening time, LPs allowed the possibility of lengthier compositions or suites which could be contained in one album. Soon after, space age pop composers were producing concept albums. Themes included exploring wild life and dealing with emotions, with some albums meant to be played while dining or relaxing. This was accompanied in the mid-1950s with the invention of book-like gatefold packaging, which allowed room for liner notes to explain the concept.

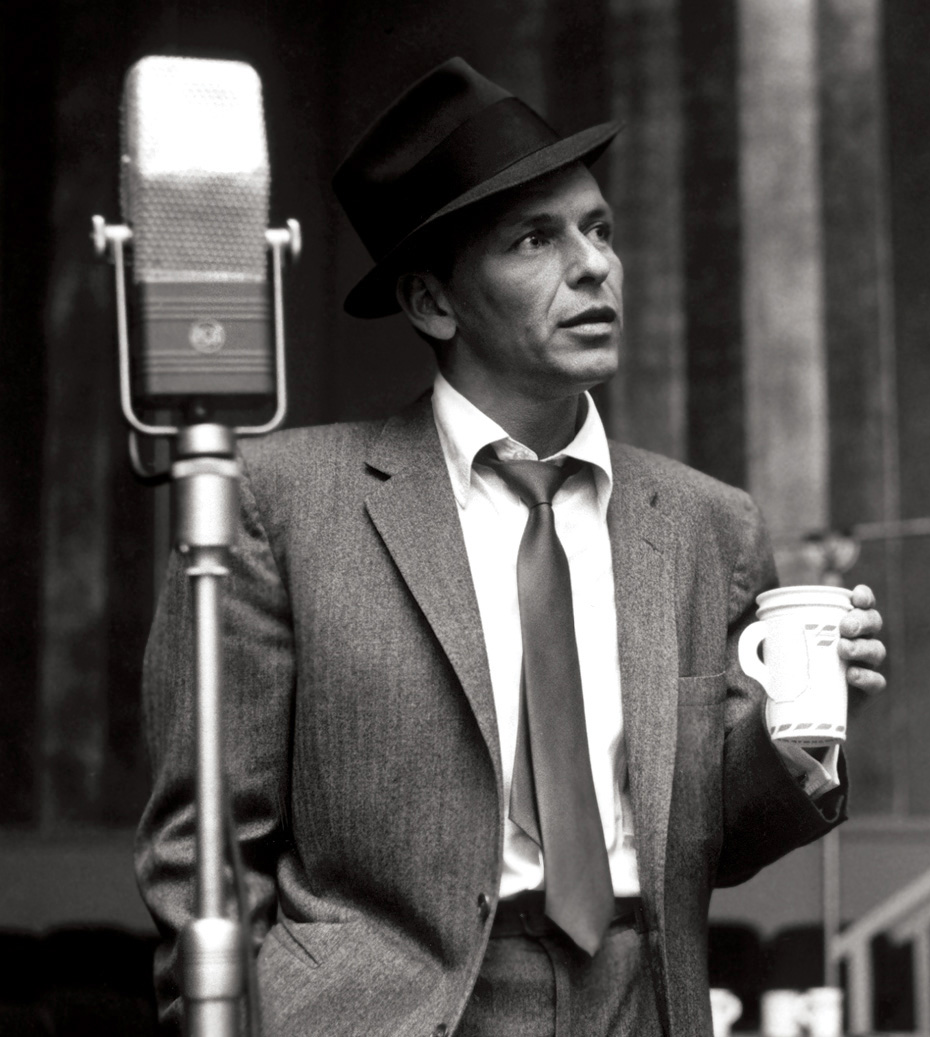
Frank Sinatra in Capitol Records Studio A, 1956, during the recording of his album Songs for Swingin' Lovers!

Singer Frank Sinatra recorded several concept albums prior to the 1960s rock era, including In the Wee Small Hours (1955) and Frank Sinatra Sings for Only the Lonely (1958). Sinatra is occasionally credited as the inventor of the concept album, beginning with The Voice of Frank Sinatra (1946), which led to similar work by Bing Crosby. According to biographer Will Friedwald, Sinatra "sequenced the songs so that the lyrics created a flow from track to track, affording an impression of a narrative, as in musical comedy or opera. ... [He was the] first pop singer to bring a consciously artistic attitude to recording." (Note: In the late 1940s, boogie-woogie and stride pianist Pete Johnson recorded an early concept album, House Rent Party (1946), in which he starts out playing alone, supposedly in a new empty house, and is joined there by other players. Each has a solo single backed by Johnson, and then the whole group plays a jam session together.)

Singer/pianist Nat "King" Cole (who, along with Sinatra, often collaborated with arranger Nelson Riddle during this era) was also an early pioneer of concept albums, as with his Wild Is Love (1960), a suite of original songs about a man's search for love.

Julie London's 1956 album Calendar Girl included one song about each of the months of the year as well as one called "Thirteenth Month."

=== 1960s: Rock and country music ===
In the early 1960s, concept albums became common in American country music, such as Gunfighter Ballads and Trail Songs (1959), by Marty Robbins. However, country concept albums were largely unacknowledged by fans and critics of rock and pop, who would only begin noting concept albums as a phenomenon later in the decade, when such albums became closely aligned with countercultural ideology, resulting in a recognised "album era" and the introduction of the rock concept album. The author Carys Wyn Jones writes that the Beach Boys' Pet Sounds (1966), the Beatles' Revolver (1966) and Sgt. Pepper's Lonely Hearts Club Band (1967), and the Who's Tommy (1969) are variously cited as "the first concept album", usually for their "uniform excellence rather than some lyrical theme or underlying musical motif".

Other records have been claimed as "early" or "first" concept albums. The Beach Boys' first six albums, released over 1962–64, featured collections of songs unified respectively by a central concept, such as cars, surfing, and teenage lifestyles. Writing in 101 Albums That Changed Popular Music, Chris Smith commented: "Though albums such as Frank Sinatra's 1955 In the Wee Small Hours and Marty Robbins' 1959 Gunfighter Ballads and Trail Songs had already introduced concept albums, [the Beach Boys' 1963 album] Little Deuce Coupe was the first to comprise almost all original material rather than standard covers." Music historian Larry Starr, who identifies the Beach Boys' 1964 releases Shut Down Volume 2 and All Summer Long as heralding the album era, cites Pet Sounds as the first rock concept album on the basis that it had been "conceived as an integrated whole, with interrelated songs arranged in a deliberate sequence."

The 100 Greatest Bands of All Time (2015) states that the Ventures "pioneered the idea of the rock concept album years before the genre is generally acknowledged to have been born". Writing in his Concise Dictionary of Popular Culture, Marcel Danesi identifies the Beatles' Rubber Soul (1965) and the Who's The Who Sell Out (1967) as other examples of early concept albums. Brian Boyd of The Irish Times names the Kinks' Face to Face (1966) as the first concept album: "Written entirely by Ray Davies, the songs were supposed to be linked by pieces of music, so that the album would play without gaps, but the record company baulked at such radicalism. It's not one of the band's finest works, but it did have an impact." The Moody Blues' second album Days of Future Passed (1967) is also often considered one of rock's first concept albums. The group would also release further concept albums including In Search of the Lost Chord (1968), On the Threshold of a Dream (1969), and To Our Children's Children's Children (1969).

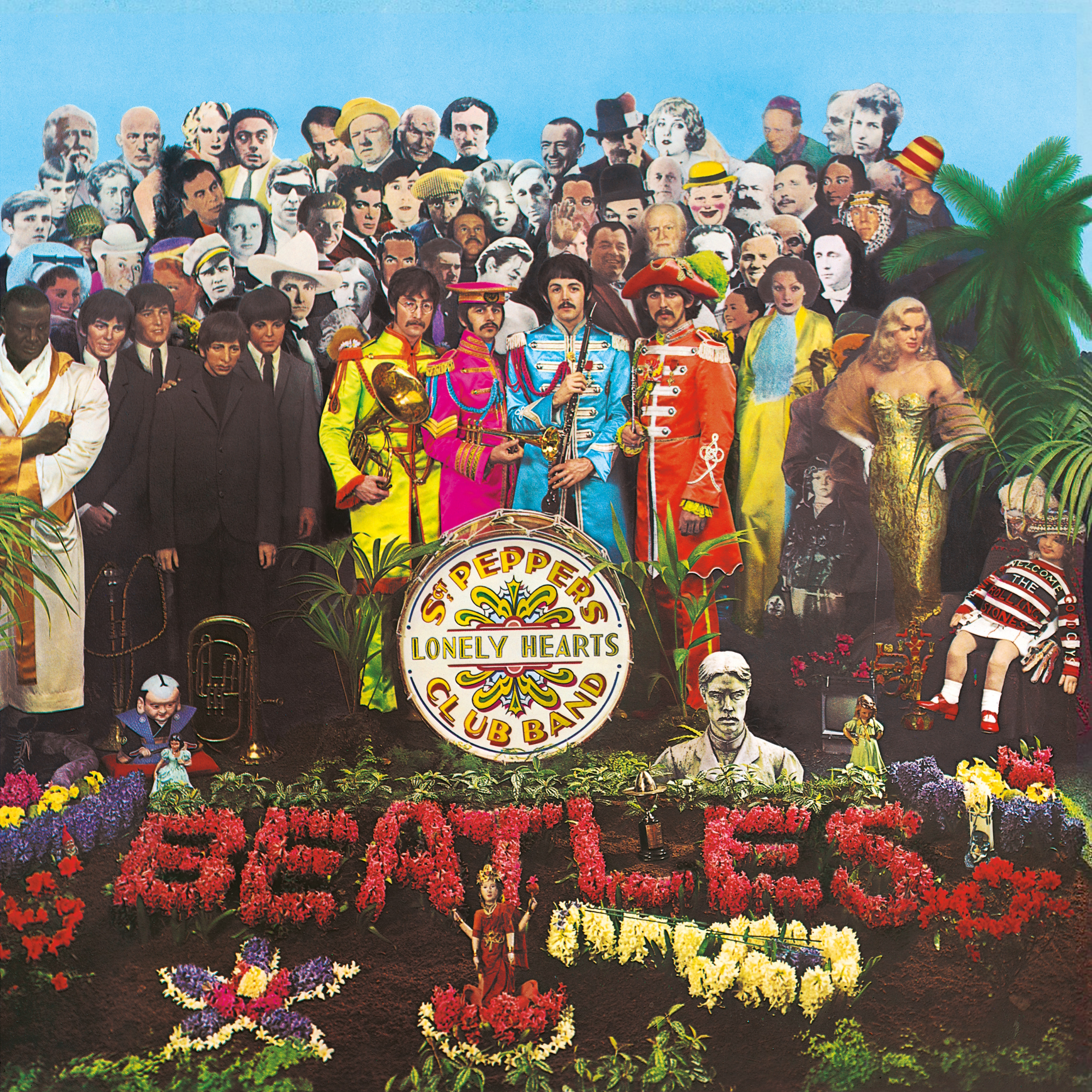
Cover art of the Beatles' 1967 album Sgt. Pepper's Lonely Hearts Club Band

"Popular consensus" for the first rock concept album, according to AllMusic, favours Sgt. Pepper. According to music critic Tim Riley, "Strictly speaking, the Mothers of Invention's Freak Out! [1966] has claims as the first 'concept album', but Sgt. Pepper was the record that made that idea convincing to most ears." (Note: Frank Zappa said that within Freak Out!, "It wasn't as if we had a hit single and we needed to build some filler around it. Each tune had a function." The Beatles' John Lennon commented: "Sgt. Pepper is called the first concept album, but it doesn't go anywhere ... it works because we said it worked.") Musicologist Allan Moore says that "Even though previous albums had set a unified mood (notably Sinatra's Songs for Swingin' Lovers!), it was on the basis of the influence of Sgt. Pepper that the penchant for the concept album was born." (Note: He continues that: "Things might have looked different had Brian Wilson and the Beach Boys managed to complete the album Smile at the time. ... it would have suggested an entirely different possible line of development for the concept album, wherein parts of tracks reappeared in others producing a form frankly far more sophisticated than any of its contemporaries.") Adding to Sgt. Pepper's claim, the artwork reinforced its central theme by depicting the four Beatles in uniform as members of the Sgt. Pepper band, while the record omitted the gaps that usually separated album tracks. Music critic and journalist Neil Slaven stated that Frank Zappa's Absolutely Free, released the same day as Sgt. Pepper, was "very much a concept album, but The Beatles effortlessly stole his thunder", and subsequently Sgt. Pepper was hailed as "perhaps the first 'concept album' even though the songs were unrelated."

=== 1960s–70s: Rock operas, progressive rock, soul, and disco ===
Author Bill Martin relates the assumed concept albums of the 1960s to progressive rock:

In discussions of progressive rock, the idea of the "concept album" is mentioned frequently. If this term refers to albums that have thematic unity and development throughout, then in reality there are probably fewer concept albums than one might first think. Pet Sounds and Sergeant Pepper's do not qualify according to this criterion ... However, if we instead stretch the definition a bit, to where the album is the concept, then it is clear that progressive rock is entirely a music of concept albums—and this flows rather directly of Rubber Soul (December 1965) and then Revolver (1966), Pet Sounds, and Sergeant Pepper's. ... in the wake of these albums, many rock musicians took up "the complete album approach."

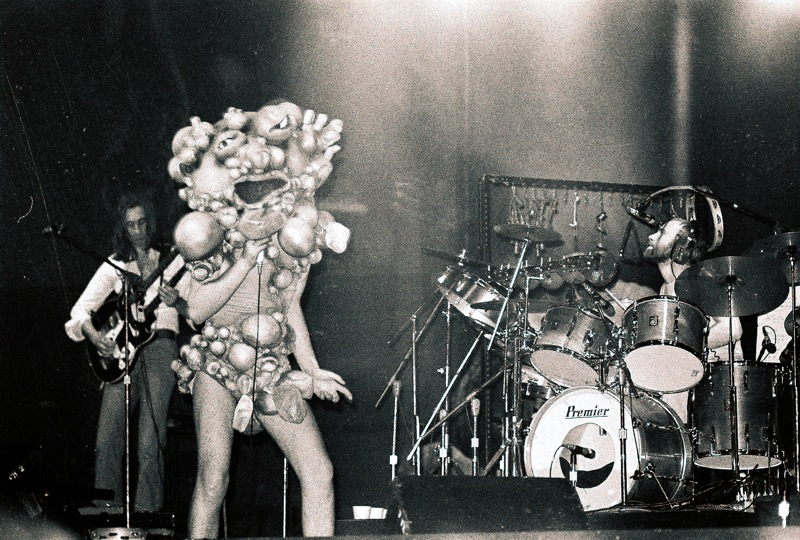
Genesis recreating their concept album The Lamb Lies Down on Broadway (1974) for a live performance. Band member Peter Gabriel is wearing a costume for one of the album's characters.

Popmatters' Sarah Zupko notes that while the Who's Tommy is "popularly thought of as the first rock opera, an extra-long concept album with characters, a consistent storyline, and a slight bit of pomposity", it is preceded by the shorter concept albums Ogdens' Nut Gone Flake (Small Faces, 1968) and S.F. Sorrow (The Pretty Things, 1968). Stewart Mason of AllMusic also retrospectively described The Story of Simon Simopath by British psychedelic pop band Nirvana, released in 1967, as an "unashamedly twee early concept album" with a "deliberately childlike tone", and the album was also selected for The MOJO Collection as one of the most significant albums in musical history due to its early forays into the format. On the consolidation of the format, author Jim Cullen states: "The concept album reached its apogee in the 1970s in ambitious records like Pink Floyd's Dark Side of the Moon (1973) and the Eagles' Hotel California (1976)." In 2015, Rolling Stone ranked Dark Side of the Moon at number one among the 50 greatest progressive rock albums of all time, also noting the LP's stature as the second-best-selling album of all time. Pink Floyd's The Wall (1979), a semi-autobiographical story modeled after the band's Roger Waters and former member Syd Barrett, is one of the most famous concept albums by any artist. In addition to The Wall, Danesi highlights Genesis' The Lamb Lies Down on Broadway (1974) and Frank Zappa's Joe's Garage (1979) as other culturally significant concept albums.

According to author Edward Macan, concept albums as a recurrent theme in progressive rock was directly inspired by the counterculture associated with "the proto-progressive bands of the 1960s", observing: "the consistent use of lengthy forms such as the programmatic song cycle of the concept album and the multimovement suite underscores the hippies' new, drug-induced conception of time."

Progressive soul musicians inspired by this approach conceived concept albums during this era reflecting themes and concerns of the African-American experience, including Marvin Gaye (1971's What's Going On), George Clinton (the 1975 Parliament album Mothership Connection), and Stevie Wonder's Innervisions (1973) and Songs in the Key of Life (1976).

During the 1970s, concept albums had begun developing within disco, specifically through the works of Donna Summer and producers Giorgio Moroder and Pete Bellote. Their albums increasingly employed overarching themes and narratives, including Four Seasons of Love (1976), which structured a love affair around the four seasons, and I Remember Yesterday (1977), whose tracks moved through different eras of popular music before concluding with the intentionally futuristic "I Feel Love." Their double album Once Upon a Time (1977), a disco adaptation of the Cinderella story, furthered the development of long-form narrative within disco. Music scholar Alex Jeffery places the album within a broader Eurodisco tradition in which producers experimented with adapting classical narratives to dance music.

Other artists soon brought their own concepts to disco and related dance genres. Examples include Phylicia Rashad's 1978 album Josephine Superstar, which details the life of film star and activist Josephine Baker; Parliament's Mothership Connection (1975) featuring space disco elements such as sci-fi, UFOs, galactic exploration, and spaceflight; The Undisputed Truth's Method to the Madness (1976) which is framed by the group's abduction by aliens and performance for "the Space Gods"; French band Voyage's self-titled debut album (1977); and Dee D. Jackson's space disco album Cosmic Curves (1978).

The concept-album format was also adopted within electronic music during the 1970s. Scholarship on Kraftwerk identifies the group's output from 1974 to 1981 as a sequence of concept albums developed around recurring themes of technology, transportation, retro-futurism and the relationship between humans and machines.

In the country realm, Willie Nelson recorded the most prominent concept albums, releasing Phases and Stages in 1974 and Red Headed Stranger in 1975. The latter went double platinum in the United States, launching him from being merely a noted songwriter and regional success to worldwide superstardom.

=== 1980s–present: Decline and return to popularity ===
With the emergence of MTV as a music video network which valued singles over albums, concept albums became less dominant in the 1980s. Some artists, however, still released concept albums and experienced success in the 1990s and 2000s, including within dance and electronic music.

Madonna's house-influenced Erotica (1992), described retrospectively as a concept album about sex and love, explored sexuality alongside personal relationships and AIDS-related loss. Released simultaneously with her Sex book, the album formed part of a broader multimedia project whose surrounding publicity and controversy frequently overshadowed the music itself.

Self's fourth studio album Gizmodgery (2000) was recorded entirely with toy instruments, selling 13,000 units in one week. NME's Emily Barker cites Green Day's American Idiot (2004) as one of the "more notable" examples, having brought the concept album back to high-charting positions. My Chemical Romance's The Black Parade (2006) is another example of a modern concept album. Dorian Lynskey, writing for GQ, noted a resurgence of concept albums in the 2010s due to streaming: "This is happening not in spite of the rise of streaming and playlists, but because of it. Threatened with redundancy in the digital era, albums have fought back by becoming more album-like." Cucchiara argues that concept albums should also describe "this new generation of concept albums, for one key reason. This is because the unison between the songs on a particular album has now been expanded into a broader field of visual and artistic design and marketing strategies that play into the themes and stories that form the album."

Twenty One Pilots' albums Blurryface (2015), and Trench (2018) are unique examples of concept albums achieving wide-scale success that also translated into the singles market during the 2010s. As well as presenting individual themes and stories, they follow each other in a progressing storyline, as part of a universe that spans over the course of multiple albums including Clancy (2024) and Breach (2025), which is the final installation of the story. More recent concepts albums include Ethel Cain's Preacher's Daughter (2022) and the sister album, Willoughby Tucker, I'll Always Love You (2025). Irish singer Hozier released the critically acclaimed Unreal Unearth in 2023, a concept album that follows Dante's in his descent to the underworld, based on the book Dante's Inferno.

Towards the end of the 1980s, however, as heavy metal suited a fairly niche crowd, a small number of heavy metal artists began producing concept albums, particularly groups with more influences from progressive rock, and this would further develop the progressive metal and power metal genres. King Diamond's Abigail and Savatage's Hall of the Mountain King, both released in 1987, stand some of the earliest examples of concept albums produced by a heavy metal artist. A year later, Iron Maiden's, Seventh Son of a Seventh Son, released in 1988, would become one of the most commercially successful examples of a heavy metal concept album at the time. Also around this point, the genre of progressive metal became more fully consolidated with artists such as Queensrÿche, Fates Warning, and Savatage attaining success, particularly following the release of Queensrÿche's successful concept album Operation: Mindcrime in 1988, which is considered to be one of the first definitive examples of a true progressive metal album. Thus it could be argued that from the genre's inception, progressive metal has been a hotspot for concept albums, like its rock counterpart. Other notable progressive metal concept albums are Dream Theater's Metropolis Pt. 2: Scenes from a Memory, Opeth's Still Life, and Orphaned Land's Mabool.

In the 21st century, the field of classical music has adopted the idea of the concept album, citing such historical examples as Schubert's Winterreise and Schumann's Liederkreis as prototypes for contemporary composers and musicians. Classical composers and performers increasingly adopt production and marketing strategies that unify otherwise disparate works into concept albums or concerts. Since 2019, the classical music magazine Gramophone has included a special category for "concept album" in its annual recordings of the year awards, to celebrate "albums where a creative mind has curated something visionary, a programme whose whole speaks more powerfully than its parts. A thought-through journey, which compels to be heard in one sitting."

In a year-ending essay on the album in 2019, Ann Powers wrote for Slate that the year found the medium in a state of flux. In her observation, many recording artists revitalized the concept album around autobiographical narratives and personal themes, such as intimacy, intersectionality, African-American life, the violation of women's boundaries, and grief associated with death. She cited such albums as Brittany Howard's Jaime, Raphael Saadiq's Jimmy Lee, Jamila Woods' Legacy! Legacy!, Rapsody's Eve, Jenny Lewis' On the Line, Julia Jacklin's Crushing, Joe Henry's The Gospel According to Water, and Nick Cave's Ghosteen. Epic: The Musical, a series of concept albums retelling The Odyssey, arose to massive popularity, with its first release in January 2023 surpassing three million streams within its first week of release and the musical remaining popular as subsequent "saga" albums were released, the last one being released in December 2024.

== See also ==
- List of concept albums
- Visual album
- Leitmotif

== Bibliography ==
- Cullen, Jim (2001). Restless in the Promised Land. Rowman & Littlefield. ISBN 978-1-58051-093-6.
- Danesi, Marcel (2017). Concise Dictionary of Popular Culture. Rowman & Littlefield. ISBN 978-1-4422-5312-4.
- Elicker, Martina (2001). "Concept Albums: Song Cycles in Popular Music". Word and Music Studies: Essays on the Song Cycle and on Defining the Field. Rodopi. ISBN 90-420-1565-9.
- Friedwald, Will (1995). Sinatra! the Song is You: A Singer's Art. Simon and Schuster. ISBN 9780684193687.
- Jones, Carys Wyn (2008). The Rock Canon. Ashgate. ISBN 978-0-7546-6244-0.
- Macan, Edward (1997). Rocking the Classics: English Progressive Rock and the Counterculture. Oxford University Press. ISBN 978-0-19-509887-7.
- Martin, Bill (2015). Listening to the Future: The Time of Progressive Rock, 1968-1978. Open Court Publishing Company. ISBN 978-0-8126-9944-9.
- McKnight-Trontz, Jennifer (1999). Exotiquarium: Album Art from the Space Age. St. Martin's Press. ISBN 978-0-312-20133-3.
- Moore, Allan F. (2016). Song Means: Analysing and Interpreting Recorded Popular Song. Routledge. ISBN 978-1-317-05265-4.
- Moskowitz, David V., ed. (2015). The 100 Greatest Bands of All Time: A Guide to the Legends Who Rocked the World [2 volumes]: A Guide to the Legends Who Rocked the World. ABC-CLIO. ISBN 978-1-4408-0340-6.
- Riley, Tim (1988). Tell Me Why: The Beatles: Album By Album, Song By Song, The Sixties And After. Alfred A. Knopf. ISBN 978-0-394-55061-9.
- Rojek, Chris (2004). Frank Sinatra. Polity. ISBN 9780745630908.
- Sheff, David (1981). Golson, G. Barry (ed.). All We Are Saying: The Last Major Interview with John Lennon and Yoko Ono (2000 ed.). St Martin's Griffin. ISBN 978-0-312-25464-3.
- Shuker, Roy (2012). Popular Music Culture: The Key Concepts. Routledge. ISBN 978-1-136-57771-0.
- Shuker, Roy (2017). Popular Music: The Key Concepts. London: Routledge. ISBN 978-1138680920.
- Smith, Chris (2009). 101 Albums that Changed Popular Music. Oxford University Press. ISBN 978-0-19-537371-4.
- Starr, Larry (2007) [2006]. American Popular Music: From Minstrelsy to MP3 (2nd ed.). New York: Oxford University Press. ISBN 9780195300536.
- Zappa, Frank; Occhiogrosso, Peter (1989). The real Frank Zappa book. New York: Poseidon Press. ISBN 0-671-70572-5.
