= Leslie M. Harris =

American historian

Leslie Harris
- Education: Columbia University (BA); Stanford University (MA, PhD)
- Scientific career
- Fields: History; African American studies; African studies
- Workplaces: University of Maryland at College Park; Emory University; Northwestern University; Radcliffe Institute for Advanced Study at Harvard University

Leslie Maria Harris is an American historian and scholar of African American Studies. She is a professor of History and African American Studies at Northwestern University. Harris studies the history of African Americans in the United States. She has published work on the history of slavery in New York City, on slavery, gender and sexuality in the Antebellum South, and on the historiography of slavery in the United States.

== Education and positions ==
Harris attended Columbia University, where she graduated in 1988 with a BA degree, majoring in American history and minoring in literature. Thereafter she attended Stanford University, where she obtained an MA degree in American History in 1993, followed by a PhD in 1995 in American history with a secondary focus on African history and a tertiary focus on humanities.

From 1994 to 1995, Harris was a postdoctoral researcher at the University of Maryland at College Park. In 1995, she became a professor of history at Emory University. She remained at Emory until 2016. Beginning in 2003, Harris was also affiliated with the department of African American Studies at Emory, where she served as the chair for multiple years. She was also a co-founder and director of the Transforming Community Project at Emory. In 2011 Harris was awarded a Winship Distinguished Research Professorship in the Humanities, which recognizes "tenured faculty who demonstrate singular accomplishments in research". In 2016, she moved to Northwestern University, where she became a professor in the departments of history and African American studies.

Harris was chosen as the 2020–2021 Beatrice Shepherd Blane Fellow at the Radcliffe Institute for Advanced Study at Harvard University, to work on a book studying Hurricane Katrina in the context of family history and climate change.

== Research ==
In 2003, Harris published In the Shadow of Slavery: African Americans in New York City, 1626-1863. Harris studies the history of slavery in New York City throughout the 17th, 18th, and especially the 19th centuries, with a focus on the 1830s and 1840s. She particularly focuses on the city's Black voluntary associations, which began as informal networks organized around purposes like mutual aid and mechanical or literary instruction, and evolved into formal institutions that helped structure the lives of African American residents of the city. In the Shadow of Slavery won the 2003 Wesley-Logan Prize from the American Historical Association and the Association for the Study of African American Life and History, which is "awarded annually for an outstanding book in African diaspora history". In 2005, she co-edited the book Slavery in New York with Ira Berlin, which accompanied an exhibition on Slavery in New York by the New-York Historical Society.

In 2011, Harris organized the first ever conference on slavery and the university, which was held at Emory University. This conference was the originator of several pieces in a book that Harris co-edited with James T. Campbell and Alfred L. Brophy, called Slavery and the University: Histories and Legacies and published in 2019. The chapters of Slavery and the University study the history of American higher education, and higher education in contemporary America, in light of revelations about universities and slavery.

Harris has also co-edited two books with Daina Ramey Berry. The first of these was Slavery and Freedom in Savannah, published in 2014. In collaboration with the Telfair Museums preservation of the slave quarters at the Owens–Thomas House, the chapters in the volume study urban slavery in antebellum Georgia and aim to place urban slavery in the broader context of southern American slavery. The book focuses on Savannah, Georgia both as an integral part of the staple crop production of the surrounding rural areas as well as a distinctive area with somewhat different social systems. Though Slavery and Freedom in Savannah begins with a study of the founding of the Province of Georgia in the mid-1700s and largely focuses on studying slavery in Savannah, it also studies the ramifications of these systems as late as the era of the Civil Rights Movement in the mid-1900s. Harris and Berry also co-edited the 2018 book Sexuality and Slavery: Reclaiming Intimate Histories in the Americas, a collection that E. R. Crowther wrote uses the small amount of evidence that is available on the topic to understand "how intimacy and sexuality operated in the cruel world of slavery".

Harris has engaged in substantial public education regarding African American history. She was one of the historians who was consulted on The 1619 Project for The New York Times. Harris has written that although she argued that evidence was insufficient to conclude "that the patriots fought the American Revolution in large part to preserve slavery in North America," the project was overall a "much-needed corrective to the blindly celebratory histories that once dominated our understanding of the past." She has also stated that by ignoring her advice, editors opened the door for critics to "use the overstated claims to discredit the entire undertaking".

== Selected works ==
- In the Shadow of Slavery: African Americans in New York City, 1626-1863 (University of Chicago Press, 2003)
  ISBN 9780226317731
- "Slavery, emancipation, and class formation in colonial and early national New York City," Journal of Urban History, 2004
- Slavery in New York, co-edited with Ira Berlin, (New Press, 2005) ISBN 9781565849976
- Slavery and freedom in Savannah, co-edited with Daina Ramey Berry (University of Georgia Press, 2014)
  ISBN 9780820344096
- Sexuality and Slavery: Reclaiming Intimate Histories in the Americas, co-edited with Daina Ramey Berry (University of Georgia Press, 2018) ISBN 9780820354033
- Slavery and the University: Histories and Legacies, co-edited with James T. Campbell and Alfred L. Brophy (University of Georgia Press, 2019) ISBN 9780820354422
