= Water Made Us =

Studio album by Jamila Woods
- Released: October 13, 2023
- Genres: R&B, neo soul
- Length: 45:01
- Label: Jagjaguwar
- Producers: Alissia Benveniste; Biako; Chris McClenney; George Moore; Gia Margaret; Grades; Jamila Woods; Nao; Peter CottonTale; Wynne Ashley Bennett

Jamila Woods chronology
Legacy! Legacy! (2019)	Water Made Us (2023)

Singles from Water Made Us
- 1. "Tiny Garden" Released: July 11, 2023; 2. "Boomerang" Released: August 16, 2023; 3. "Good News" Released: September 13, 2023

Water Made Us is the third studio album by American singer-songwriter and poet Jamila Woods. It was released on October 13, 2023, through Jagjaguwar.

== Background and composition ==
Water Made Us was born out of a period of "intense self-reflection and creative expression" during the COVID-19 pandemic. As she "sat in the house for 2 years" she became her own "source material", of which she loves to draw inspiration from. In a statement, Woods described the project as "the most personal and vulnerable piece of art" she has ever created. She personally wished for the album to become a playlist that carries one through a "life cycle of a relationship", as she and co-producer Chris McClenney tried to narrow the tracklist down to 17 tracks. McClenney praised her "amazing sense of language and a way with words" that puts "so much weight" on every lyric of the album.

The project was described as her own "search for love". While the first few tracks capture the "fluttery apprehension of a new connection", the ballads "Wreckage Room" and "Thermostat" reflect on motifs such as "conflict" and heartbreak. Finally, the songs concluding the album are seen as "mantra songs" by Woods due to their "expressions of accumulated wisdom".

== Release and promotion ==
The lead single "Tiny Garden" was released on July 11 and features New York singer Duendita. A "nourishing, uplifting" track with "hip-hop instrumentation" that sees another chapter of her signature "spirit of benevolence", Pitchfork writer Dylan Green awarded it "Best New Music" upon release. Woods explained that the song is about the way her heart works in "the slow and steady way" she loves. An accompanying music video sees her directorial debut, as she expresses how she oftentimes feels about relationships. On August 16, Woods released the single "Boomerang", co-written by Nao, London producers Grades and George Moore. The singer revealed that the song talks about the kind of relationship "keeps popping back up throughout your life" and the feelings that come with wondering "will we or won't we?" A third single titled "Good News" came out on September 13. The song was integral to the determination of what the album title would be, as it arose from a lyric of the track.

In October 2023, Woods announced The Water Made Us Tour in support of the album. The tour began on February 1, 2024 in Seattle and concluded on April 30, 2024 in Copenhagen.

== Critical reception ==
Professional ratings
Aggregate scores
Source	Rating
Metacritic	85/100
Review scores
Source	Rating
AllMusic	4/5 stars
Beats Per Minute	85%
Clash	9/10
HipHopDX	4.2/5
Exclaim!	8/10
The Guardian	4/5 stars
The Line of Best Fit	8/10
Pitchfork	8.0/10
PopMatters	8/10
Slant Magazine	4/5 stars

According to the review aggregator Metacritic, Water Made Us received "universal acclaim" based on a weighted average score of 85 out of 100 from 11 critic scores.

Writing for AllMusic, Andy Kellman praised the album as "unique in the way it examines and reflects on love with its philosophical and patient yet unconcealed perspective." HipHopDX's Alec Siegel praised the album as "bursting with intimate details on a diorama-sized scale that loosely trace the relationship lifecycle: the boundless beginning, the comfortable middle, the abrupt end, and, crucially, the reflective aftermath." Robin Murray of Clash described the album as "lavish in scope but touchingly personal." Writing for Beats Per Minute, Steve Forstneger praised the album as "possibly the most intelligent album about love this decade." Pitchfork's Tarisai Ngangura praised Woods' writing as having "irreverence, flexibility, and discipline." Writing for The Guardian, Rachel Aroesti described the album as "hook-filled" and "restlessly genre-blending." Noah Barker of The Line of Best Fit praised the album's themes as "pair[ing] harmony with righteousness." In his review for PopMatters, Steve Horowitz described Woods' as having "a good sense of humor and engag[ing] in wordplay and childlike melodies to affect a mood or make a point." Slant Magazine's Dana Poland described the album as a "radically honest journey through the complexities of love." Safiya Hopfe of Exclaim! described the album as "densely poetic and sonically diverse."

=== Accolades ===
Publication	Accolade	Rank	Ref.
Consequence	The 50 Best Albums of 2023	17	
Entertainment Weekly	The 10 best albums of 2023	5	
The New York Times	Best Albums of 2023	8	
PopMatters	The 80 Best Albums of 2023	55	
Rolling Stone	The 100 Best Albums of 2023	88	
Slant Magazine	The 50 Best Albums of 2023	39	
Time	The 10 Best Albums of 2023	5	
Under the Radar	Top 100 Albums of 2023	53	

== Track listing ==
Water Made Us track listing
No.	Title	Writer(s)	Producer(s)	Length
1.	"Bugs"	Jamila Woods; Alissia Benveniste; Homer Steinweiss; Jasmin Charles	Alissia Benveniste	3:21
2.	"Tiny Garden" (featuring Duendita)	Woods; Chris McClenney; Candace Camacho; Wynne Ashley Bennett	McClenney; Bennett	4:11
3.	"Practice" (featuring Saba)	Woods; McClenney; Charles; Tahj Malik Chandler	McClenney	3:14
4.	"Let the Cards Fall"	Woods	Woods	0:43
5.	"Send a Dove"	Woods; McClenney; Peter Wilkins	Woods; McClenney; Peter CottonTale	3:56
6.	"Wreckage Room"	Woods; Julian Davis Reed; Wilkins	CottonTale	3:19
7.	"Thermostat" (featuring Peter CottonTale)	Woods; Justin Canavan; Nate Fox; Wilkins; Shaan Ramaprasad	CottonTale	3:01
8.	"Out of the Doldrums"	Woods	Woods	0:35
9.	"Wolfsheep"	Woods; McClenney	McClenney	2:57
10.	"I Miss All My Exes" (featuring Gia Margaret)	Woods; McClenney; Margaret Comes; Nico Segal	Woods; Gia Margaret	1:57
11.	"Backburner"	Woods; McClenney	McClenney	3:29
12.	"Libra Intuition"	Woods	Woods	0:14
13.	"Boomerang"	Woods; Daniel Traynor; McClenney; George Moore; Neo Jessica Joshua	Grades; McClenney; Nao; George Moore	3:02
14.	"Still"	Woods; McClenney; Bennett	McClenney; Bennett	3:02
15.	"The Best Thing"	Woods	Woods	0:33
16.	"Good News"	Woods; Itai David Shapira; Jean Placide	Biako	3:03
17.	"Headfirst"	Woods; McClenney; Bennett; George Lewis Jr.	McClenney; Bennett	4:24
Total length:				45:01
