= Legacy! Legacy! =

Studio album by Jamila Woods
- Released: May 10, 2019
- Studio: Audiotree; SoundScape (Chicago)
- Genre: R&B; neo soul; funk; electro-soul; hip hop
- Length: 49:02
- Label: Jagjaguwar
- Producer: Slot-A; Oddcouple; Peter Cottontale; Ralph Gene; Justin Canavan; Aminata Burton; Jamila Woods; Stephon "Mooch" Brown; Jasmin Charles; Nico Segal

Jamila Woods chronology
| Heavn (2016) | Legacy! Legacy! (2019) | Water Made Us (2023) |

Professional ratings
Aggregate scores
| Source | Rating |
|---|---|
| AnyDecentMusic? | 8.4/10 |
| Metacritic | 89/100 |
Review scores
| Source | Rating |
| AllMusic | 5/5 stars |
| And It Don't Stop | B+ |
| Chicago Tribune | 3.5/4 stars |
| Exclaim! | 8/10 |
| Financial Times | 4/5 stars |
| The Guardian | 4/5 stars |
| NME | 5/5 stars |
| Pitchfork | 8.5/10 |
| Rolling Stone | 4/5 stars |
| Uncut | 9/10 |

Legacy! Legacy! is the second studio album by American singer-songwriter and poet Jamila Woods, released on May 10, 2019, by Jagjaguwar. Woods supported the album with her own concert tour, along with performing as the opening act for the rapper Common's tour in 2019 and the singer Raphael Saadiq's 2020 Jimmy Lee Tour.

== Critical reception ==
The album was met with widespread critical acclaim. Reviewing for AllMusic, Andy Kellman hailed it as a "galvanizing declaration of pride, support, and discontent", as well as a "modern R&B album" with mostly "electro-soul" and "chunky hip hop" productions. Ann-Derrick Gaillot from The Nation credited Woods's neo soul style for "captur[ing] the power of black pride" and achieving a novel musical accomplishment, "in which she melds disparate influences and pushes her vocal-layering techniques to build her dynamic neo-soul sound". In his "Consumer Guide" column, Robert Christgau highlighted musical qualities on the songs "Miles", "Muddy", "Zora", and "Basquiat" while saying of the album as a whole: "This poetry-with-sophistofunk tribute to a sharp selection of 20th-century African-American art heroes plus Frida Kahlo will always be a tad too atmospheric and impressionistic to suit me. But it does both flow and signify."

In a year-end essay for Slate, Ann Powers cited Legacy! Legacy! as one of her favorite albums from 2019 and proof that the format is not dead but rather undergoing a "metamorphosis". She added that concept albums had reemerged through the culturally-relevant autobiographical narratives of artists such as Woods, who created a tribute to her ancestors "that spoke volumes about black life today".

== Accolades ==
Accolades for Legacy! Legacy!
| Publication | List | Rank | Ref. |
|---|---|---|---|
| Exclaim! | Exclaim!'s 10 Best Soul, Funk and World Albums of 2019 | 1 | |
| Pitchfork | The 50 Best Albums of 2019 | 11 | |
| Pitchfork | The 200 Best Albums of the 2010s | 181 | |
| Stereogum | The 50 Best Albums of 2019 | 37 | |
| Under the Radar | Under the Radar's Top 100 Albums of 2019 | 82 | |

== Track listing ==
All tracks are written by Jamila Woods, except where noted.

| No. | Title | Writer(s) | Producer(s) | Length |
|---|---|---|---|---|
| 1. | "Betty" | | Oddcouple | 3:11 |
| 2. | "Zora" | | Slot-A | 3:06 |
| 3. | "Giovanni" | | Slot-A; Ralph Gene^{[a]}; Justin Canavan^{[a]}; Aminata Burton^{[a]} | 4:48 |
| 4. | "Sonia" (featuring Nitty Scott) | Woods; Nitzia Scott | Slot-A | 4:21 |
| 5. | "Frida" | | Slot-A | 2:58 |
| 6. | "Eartha" | | Peter Cottontale | 2:49 |
| 7. | "Miles" | | Slot-A | 3:08 |
| 8. | "Muddy" | | Slot-A | 3:11 |
| 9. | "Basquiat" (featuring Saba) | Woods; Tahj Chandler | Slot-A; Woods^{[a]}; Canavan^{[a]}; Burton^{[a]}; Stephon "Mooch" Brown^{[a]} | 6:45 |
| 10. | "Sun Ra" (featuring theMIND and Jasminfire) | Woods; Zarif Omer | Slot-A; Canavan^{[a]}; Jasmin Charles^{[a]} | 3:26 |
| 11. | "Octavia" | | Slot-A | 3:11 |
| 12. | "Baldwin" (featuring Nico Segal) | | Slot-A; Segal^{[a]} | 3:53 |
| 13. | "Betty (For Boogie)" | | Slot-A | 4:15 |
| Total length: | | | | 49:02 |

Track notes

- ^{^[a]} signifies an additional producer

== Charts ==
| Chart (2019) | Peak position |
|---|---|
| UK R&B Albums (OCC) | 20 |
| US Heatseekers Albums (Billboard) | 6 |
| US Independent Albums (Billboard) | 26 |
