= Heavn =

Studio album by Jamila Woods
- Released: July 15, 2016
- Genres: R&B; neo soul
- Length: 45:50
- Label: Jagjaguwar
- Producers: Saba; Nico Segal; The Roots; Kweku Collins; oddCouple; Peter CottonTale

Jamila Woods chronology
| Heavn (2016) | Legacy! Legacy! (2019) |

Professional ratings
Aggregate scores
| Source | Rating |
|---|---|
| Metacritic | 83/100 |
Review scores
| Source | Rating |
| AllMusic | 4/5 stars |
| Consequence of Sound | B+ |
| Pitchfork | 8.4/10 |
| Record Collector | 3/5 stars |
| Spin | 8/10 |
| Tom Hull – on the Web | B+ |
| Vice (Expert Witness) | (2-star Honorable Mention) |

Heavn (stylized as HEAVN) is the debut studio album by American singer-songwriter Jamila Woods. It was released on July 15, 2016 through Jagjaguwar.

Woods embarked on a North American tour in support of the album's tenth anniversary in 2026.

== Accolades ==
| Publication | Accolade | Rank | Ref. |
|---|---|---|---|
| Consequence of Sound | Top 50 Albums of 2016 | 26 | |
| Esquire | Top 30 Albums of 2016 | 24 | |
| Exclaim! | Top 15 Soul/R&B Albums of 2016 | 9 | |
| NPR | Top 50 Albums of 2016 | 27 | |
| Pitchfork | Top 50 Albums of 2016 | 36 | |
| PopMatters | Top 15 Soul/R&B Albums of 2016 | 5 | |
| Variance | Top 50 Albums of 2016 | 27 | |

== Track listing ==
| No. | Title | Length |
|---|---|---|
| 1. | "Bubbles" | 2:06 |
| 2. | "VRY BLK" | 2:54 |
| 3. | "Popsicle (Interlude)" | 0:38 |
| 4. | "Lonely" | 3:25 |
| 5. | "HEAVN" | 4:23 |
| 6. | "Eve (Interlude)" | 0:31 |
| 7. | "In My Name" | 1:25 |
| 8. | "Assata's Daughter (Interlude)" | 0:24 |
| 9. | "Blk Girl Soldier" | 3:22 |
| 10. | "LSD" (featuring Chance the Rapper) | 3:28 |
| 11. | "Still (Interlude)" | 0:27 |
| 12. | "Emerald Street" (featuring Saba) | 3:13 |
| 13. | "Lately" | 2:42 |
| 14. | "Always Loving (Interlude)" | 0:26 |
| 15. | "Breadcrumbs" (featuring Nico Segal) | 3:33 |
| 16. | "Stellar" | 2:02 |
| 17. | "Good Morning (Interlude)" | 0:28 |
| 18. | "Holy" | 3:12 |
| 19. | "Way Up" | 3:54 |
| 20. | "Holy (Reprise)" | 3:22 |
