= Jimmy Lee (album) =

Studio album by Raphael Saadiq
- Released: August 23, 2019
- Studio: Blakeslee Recording Co. (North Hollywood)
- Genres: R&B; soul; neo soul
- Length: 39:27
- Label: Columbia
- Producers: Raphael Saadiq; Brook D'Leau; Dylan Wiggins; Charles Brungardt; Charlie Bereal; Kevin Wooten

Raphael Saadiq chronology
Stone Rollin' (2011)	Jimmy Lee (2019)

Singles from Jimmy Lee
- 1. "Something Keeps Calling" Released: June 7, 2019; 2. "Glory to the Veins" Released: July 5, 2019

Jimmy Lee is the fifth studio album by American R&B singer, songwriter, and producer Raphael Saadiq. It was released on August 23, 2019 by Columbia Records. Recorded at Saadiq's personal studio in North Hollywood, it follows the critical success of his 2011 album Stone Rollin' and a period of years spent working on other musical projects, particularly those associated with African-American culture.

Departing from the upbeat retro stylings of Saadiq's previous albums, Jimmy Lee explores themes of stress, addiction, family dysfunction, financial burden, mortality, and mass incarceration, particularly in the context of African-American life. It uses murkier, more modern R&B sounds and a song cycle of personal narratives, inspired in part by the singer's older brother, who died from a heroin overdose when Saadiq was young, and after whom the album is titled. Saadiq, who played bass, guitar, and percussion, was joined in its recording by drummer Chris Dave, producer Brook D'Leau, engineer Gerry Brown, vocalist Taura Stinson, and rapper Kendrick Lamar, among others.

While performing modestly on record charts, Jimmy Lee received widespread acclaim and earned Saadiq some of the best reviews of his solo career. Critics applauded its ambitious sonic qualities and the singer's navigation through the complexities of its lyrical tragedies. Saadiq toured the US in early 2020 to further support the album, accompanied by singer-songwriter Jamila Woods as his opening act.

== Background ==
Raphael Saadiq's solo career has been haunted by the ghosts of tormented men and women. ... He's walked a fine line between approaching these self-destructive figures—stand-ins for the ruptures and trauma in African-American communities—with empathy and pity.

— Ann-Derrick Gaillot (Pitchfork, 2019)

Jimmy Lee is Saadiq's fifth album as a solo artist and his first in eight years, following the critically acclaimed Stone Rollin' (2011). In between albums, he had worked on various projects and recordings, including executive production of the Solange album A Seat at the Table (2016), score composition for the TV series Insecure, and co-writing of the Mary J. Blige song "Mighty River" (2017), which received an Academy Award nomination for its inclusion in the film Mudbound. According to Pitchfork writer Ann-Derrick Gaillot, these ventures left Saadiq's "fingerprints ... all over the past few years of Black American culture" and seemed to have "emboldened" him for Jimmy Lee.

The album is named after and inspired in part by Saadiq's brother, who died in the 1990s of a heroin overdose after contracting HIV. He was one of four siblings in Saadiq's family to die tragically young. As Dylan Hicks chronicles for City Pages, "brother Alvie was murdered in a dispute with a family member when Raphael was a boy; Jimmy Lee Baker, much older than Raphael, had a long struggle with heroin that eventually led to a fatal overdose; another brother, Desmond, a suicide, also battled chemical dependency; a sister, Sarah, was killed after backing her car into a police chase."

== Writing and recording ==
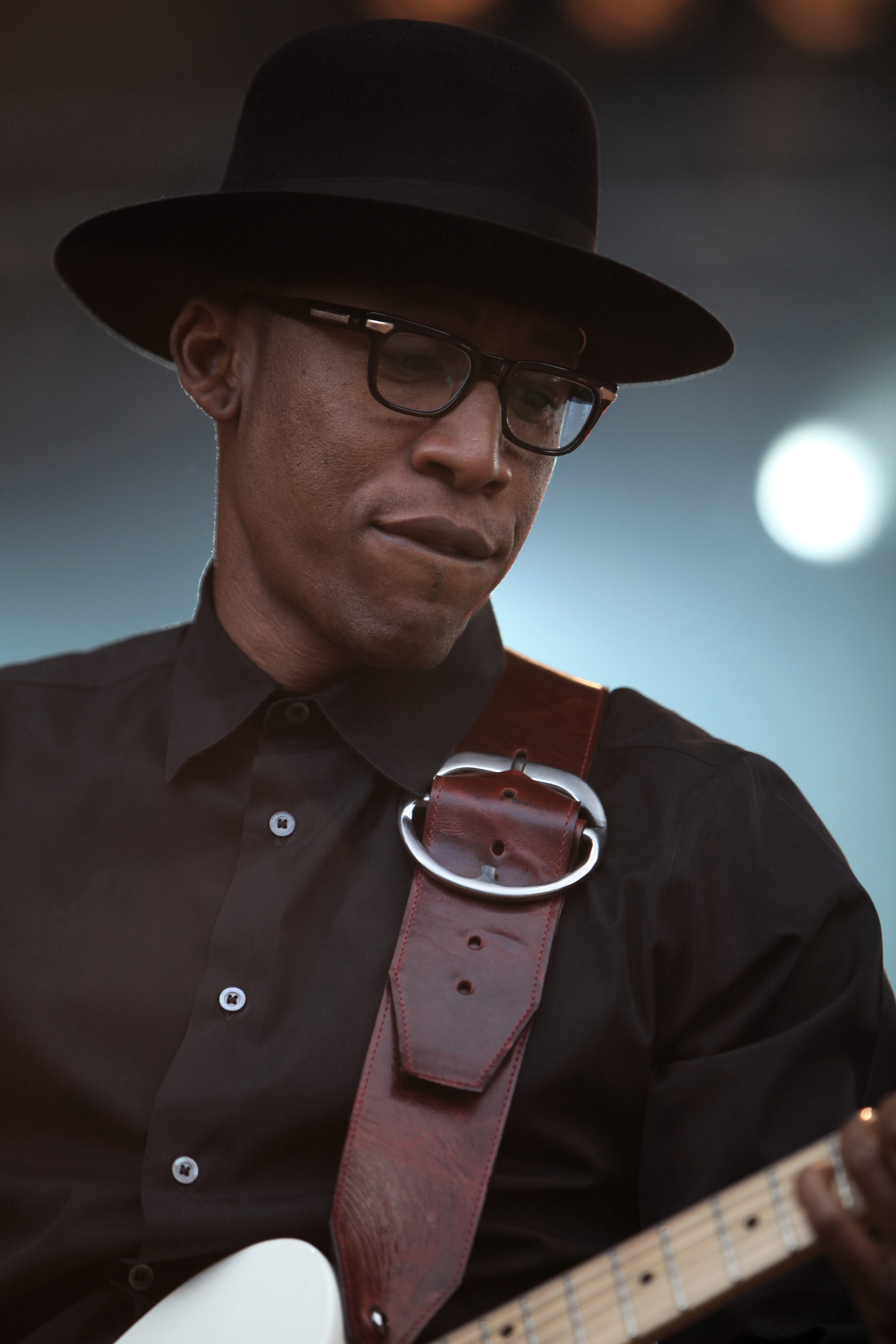
Saadiq with a guitar, one of several instruments he played for Jimmy Lee

When asked about writing the album, Saadiq told Entertainment Weekly in August 2019 that he first considered his own struggle with dieting and eating healthy before arriving at a deeper concept. "I would do it for a while but then I'd just fall off track", he explained. "Then I started thinking about people who are addicted to drugs, like my brother, and how much people wanted him to stop, and I figured I couldn't even stop doing some of the things I was doing when it came to food." After contemplating his brother's self-destruction with drugs, Saadiq elaborated on it further to write more songs, considering his own brushes with drugs, the experiences of his friends, and visits with his mother to a Kaiser Permanente facility, where he recalled seeing long lines for prescription drug pickups. "People don't realize that addiction can take over your entire life", he went on to tell the magazine. "This is a world epidemic. I stayed in that space and I didn't come back out until I was done [recording the album]."

Saadiq recorded and produced Jimmy Lee at Blakeslee Recording Co., his personal studio in North Hollywood. For certain songs, he collaborated with multi-instrumentalist Ali Shaheed Muhammad, rapper Kendrick Lamar, and producer Brook D'Leau, among others. According to Jem Aswad of Variety in August 2019, "unusually for contemporary R&B, Saadiq's songs seem mostly to have been written on guitar or bass (he excels on both), giving them a rootsy core that's rare in most popular music today."

== Music and lyrics ==
The music of Jimmy Lee is a significant departure for Saadiq artistically, abandoning the upbeat retro stylings of his previous solo albums and the psychedelic, Dylanesque influences of Stone Rollin' in particular. Instead, it features a wide range of R&B styles produced in modern fashion, albeit still employing soul and funk sounds from the 1970s. From that period, Aswad cites influences in the socially conscious recordings of Marvin Gaye, Curtis Mayfield, and Stevie Wonder, while Damien Morris from The Observer says the album strives to be a modern version of Gaye's What's Going On (1971) or Prince's Sign o' the Times (1987). Detroit Metro Times journalist Jerylin Jordan observes elements of Motown and gospel music in Jimmy Lee's "danceable neo-soul stylings". Gospel is overtly represented on "Belongs to God", while Saadiq's vocals throughout the album are characterized by gospel-style shouts, along with crooning and whispered singing.

The album's soul songs have uniform rhythms overall, although "Kings Fall", "My Walk", and "I'm Feeling Love" feature dissonance in the form of clashing electronic sounds and erratic vocals, reflecting themes of distress in their narratives. Saadiq sings over rough-sounding synthesizer sounds in a bluesy, soulful cadence on "My Walk", which is "his biggest musical departure, and also the album's most frankly autobiographical track", says Gaillot. According to Nashville Scene writer Stephen Trageser, Jimmy Lee's literary narratives about cycles of poverty, addiction, and incarceration are placed in the framework of "futuristic soul" and "warped, swirling beats", resulting in a tone that Greg Kot describes as murky throughout.

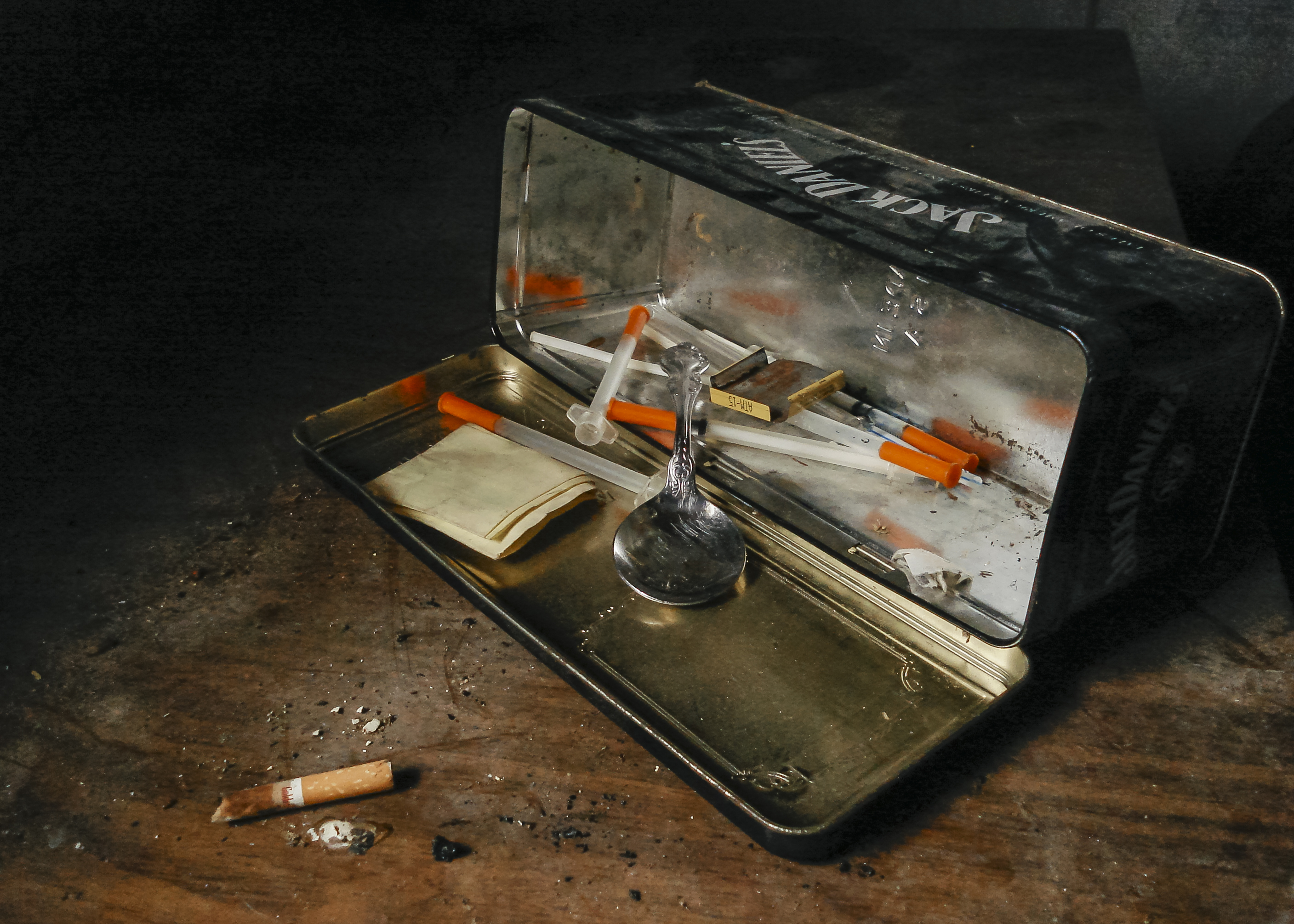
A heroin kit found in an abandoned East Texas house, 2007. Cycles of drug addiction and poverty are explored throughout the album.

Composed as a song cycle, the album follows characters who are variously affected by stress, addiction, family dysfunction, inadequate love, loneliness, chronic financial burden, despair, AIDS, death, mass incarceration, and drug criminalization's relationship to African-American men. Jordan describes it more broadly as a collection of "wise and prolific hypotheticals suited for those touched by addiction and anyone who might find themselves confronted with temptation". Perspectives from the addict are told on the blues-inspired "Kings Fall" and the groove-oriented neo soul song "I'm Feeling Love". "Kings Fall", which also takes after the Motown soul of Saadiq's The Way I See It (2008), draws on Jimmy Lee's reputation as a much-loved and charming drug addict around Saadiq's childhood neighborhood in Oakland, reflected in lyrics such as "I used to be everybody's hero / Shakin' hands and kissing babies". Another Motown-influenced track, "Rikers Island", is a protest song.

== Marketing and sales ==
Columbia Records released Jimmy Lee on August 23, 2019. "Something Keeps Calling" and "Glory to the Veins" were released as singles on June 6 and July 5, respectively. In interviews leading up to the album's release, Saadiq spoke about his relationship with Jimmy Lee and the role of heroin addiction in his brother's life. According to Mix magazine's Lily Moayeri, while Jimmy Lee is a kind of concept album, Saadiq had not perceived an overriding theme "until he started promoting the album and had to respond to what listeners were taking away from it".

Commercially, Jimmy Lee charted in the US at number 25 on Billboard magazine's Top Album Sales in the week of September 7, 2019, its only week on the chart. Saadiq further supported the album with a concert tour of the US, accompanied by a live band. Beginning on January 23, 2020, at the House of Blues in San Diego, the 27-show Jimmy Lee Tour featured DJ Duggz in the role of concert DJ and singer-songwriter Jamila Woods as the opening act.

== Critical reception ==
Jimmy Lee ratings
Aggregate scores
Source	Rating
Metacritic	90/100
Review scores
Source	Rating
AllMusic	4.5/5 stars
And It Don't Stop	A−
Chicago Tribune	4/4 stars
Daily Republic	3/4 stars
Knack	4/5 stars
The Observer	4/5 stars
Paste	8.0/10
Pitchfork	7.8/10
PopMatters	9/10
Q	4/5 stars

Jimmy Lee was met with widespread critical acclaim. At the aggregate website Metacritic, which assigns a weighted average rating out of 100 to reviews from professional publications, the album received a score of 90, based on eight reviews. It is Saadiq's highest-scoring solo work and the 63rd-scoring album of the 21st century, according to the website's data in April 2020.

Reviewing for Q in October 2019, Steve Yates hailed Jimmy Lee as "a dark album for darker times" and declared, "at 53, Saadiq is still ahead of the curve." In The New York Times, Alex Pappademas claimed, "As a solo artist, Saadiq has long been a master without a masterpiece for consensus to point to. Jimmy Lee could change that through sonic ambition alone." Adriane Pontecorvo, for PopMatters, said of the album, "Saadiq puts his artistic skills to use in full, reaching new emotional and technical heights while delving into heartbreaking lows. Jimmy Lee shows why, even though he so often stays behind the scenes these days, his is one of the most compelling voices in modern-day soul music." In Paste, Saby Reyes-Kulkarni was impressed by Saadiq's "truly remarkable combination of dexterity and ease" in maneuvering through "a complicated tangle of feelings", considering his love and idolization of Jimmy Lee growing up.

Some reviewers were more reserved in their praise. While not finding the album entirely successful in its ambition, Damien Morris of The Observer called the songs "brutally honest, occasionally impressionistic", and "beautiful", highlighting the "astonishing, soul-scraping laments" of "This World Is Drunk" and "Kings Fall". Reviewing in his "Consumer Guide" column, Robert Christgau said that only "My Walk" has a "surefire hook" on what is nevertheless a "one-of-a-kind album" that places the "slick modernist R&B" style of Saadiq's 1990s group, Tony! Toni! Toné!, "in a tragic vision of black life that's devoid of street and hood – of realities turned hip hop commonplaces that too often ignore the complexities".

In a year-end list for the Chicago Tribune, Kot ranked Jimmy Lee as the second best album of 2019, behind Woods' Legacy! Legacy! In a year-end essay for Slate, Ann Powers also named it one of her favorite albums from 2019, as well as proof that the album format is not dead but rather undergoing a "metamorphosis". She added that concept albums had reemerged through the culturally-relevant autobiographical narratives of artists such as Saadiq, whose "masterful Jimmy Lee had the R&B Jedi master using all of his wisdom as a serious soul nerd to create a tragic but ultimately transcendent saga from the real travails of his very broken family".

== Track listing ==
Jimmy Lee track listing
No.	Title	Writer(s)	Producer(s)	Length
1.	"Sinners Prayer"	Raphael Saadiq; Taura Stinson	Saadiq	4:34
2.	"So Ready"	Saadiq; Brook D'Leau	Saadiq; D'Leau	4:19
3.	"This World Is Drunk"	Saadiq	Saadiq	4:24
4.	"Something Keeps Calling" (featuring Rob Bacon)	Saadiq	Saadiq	4:44
5.	"Kings Fall"	Saadiq; Dylan Wiggins	Saadiq; Sir Dylan	2:46
6.	"I'm Feeling Love"	Saadiq; D'Leau	Saadiq; D'Leau	3:04
7.	"My Walk"	Saadiq; Charlie Bereal	Saadiq; Bereal	2:16
8.	"Belongs to God" (featuring Reverend E. Baker)	Saadiq; Elijah Baker Sr.	Saadiq	2:05
9.	"Dottie Interlude"	Saadiq; D'Leau	Saadiq; D'Leau	0:06
10.	"Glory to the Veins" (featuring Ernest Turner)	Saadiq; Charles Brungardt	Saadiq; Brungardt	2:05
11.	"Rikers Island"	Saadiq	Saadiq; D'Leau; Wooten	3:39
12.	"Rikers Island Redux" (featuring Daniel J. Watts)	Saadiq	Saddiq	2:57
13.	"Rearview" (featuring Kendrick Lamar)	Saadiq; Kendrick Duckworth	Saadiq	2:28
Total length:				39:27

- The vinyl edition ends "Rearview" with two minutes of silence and the hidden track "Angel".

== Personnel ==
Credits are adapted from AllMusic.

- Raphael Saadiq – bass guitar, guitar, percussion, additional synthesizer programming
- Taura Stinson – background vocals
- Chris Dave – drums
- Rob Bacon – guitar
- Thomas McElroy – additional synthesizer
- Daniel Crawford – additional synthesizer
- Lemar Carter – drums
- Sir Dylan – piano, recording engineering
- Ernest Turner – piano
- Brook D'Leau – drums
- Charlie Bereal – guitar
- Jairus Mozee – guitar
- Ali Shaheed Muhammad – congas
- Kelvin Wooten – upright piano, B-3 Organ
- Gerry "The Gov" Brown – recording engineering
- Hotae Alexander Jang – recording engineering, mix engineering
- Charles Brungardt – recording engineering, mix engineering
- Steve Rusch – recording engineering
- Dave Kutch – mastering

== Charts ==
Chart performance for Jimmy Lee
Chart (2019)	Peak position
French Albums (SNEP)	170
Swiss Albums (Schweizer Hitparade)	90
UK R&B Albums (Official Charts)	7
US Top Album Sales (Billboard)	25

== See also ==
- African-American family structure
- Progressive soul
- Race and health in the United States
- Race in the United States criminal justice system
