= Rum.gold =

R&B singer and songwriter

rum.gold
- Born: Delonte Drumgold; Washington, D.C.
- Origin: Brooklyn, NY
- Genres: R&B, Soul
- Years active: 2018–present
- Label: Leola LLC
- Website: www.rum.gold

Delonte Drumgold, known professionally as rum.gold, is an American R&B singer and songwriter. rum.gold is currently based in Brooklyn, NY, but he originally grew up in Washington, D.C. His childhood in the DMV area is the inspiration for a lot of his music, including his album U Street Anthology (2023).

== Early life ==
rum.gold was born at Howard University Hospital in Washington, D.C. in 1994, and he grew up living with different family members in the area. As a young child, he sang in the church choir. In high school, he started playing the trumpet and joined his school's jazz band. Inspired by his love for jazz music, rum.gold moved to Boston in 2012 to attend Berklee College of Music. He ultimately graduated with a degree in music business management and marketing.

In 2016, rum.gold moved to Brooklyn, where he began to pursue songwriting more seriously.

== Career ==
After moving to Brooklyn, rum.gold spent his first few months working odd jobs such as 1 Hotel Brooklyn Bridge, writing music, and uploading it to SoundCloud under the name Anon. Encouraged by listeners' responses, he continued writing music and switched to his current name, rum.gold. Through SoundCloud, he met Berlin-based producer James Chatburn, who helped him release his first EP, yaRn, in 2019.

In 2020, rum.gold released his second EP, aiMless, which discusses themes of his upbringing. This EP features the song Waiting For, a collaboration with singer-songwriter Jamila Woods.

In 2021, he released his first full album, Thicker Than Water. This album discusses family units, both chosen or biological, as well as rum.gold's journey to reconnect with his biological mother. The title of the album comes from the phrase "the blood of the covenant is thicker than the water of the womb," which rum.gold often heard from family members while growing up.

In 2023, rum.gold released his second full album, U Street Anthology. This album is dedicated to rum.gold's city of origin, Washington D.C., and it highlights aspects of Black history and stories that are central to the city.

On the 27th of March 2026, he released his second album Is There Anybody Home?. In his new two-part project, Is There Anybody Home?, R&B artist rum.gold explores a single narrative of inherited family trauma and childhood baggage across two different perspectives: adulthood and childhood. He deliberately released the darker, adulthood-focused Part 2 first, while the brighter, childhood-focused Part 1 is set to follow in the spring. These deeply personal themes were sparked by his experience going through a divorce at a young age, which prompted him to reflect on how his early life shaped his adult relationships and emotional reactions, leading him to compare the inheritance of emotional trauma to the physical hoarding of objects.

== Discography ==
=== EPs ===
Release date	EP name	Song name
2019	yaRn	1. "Bluu - Acoustic"; 2. "Cashmere Cage"; 3. "Get Through"; 4. "Where There's Smoke"; 5. "Cut Me Down"; 6. "Hell on Earth - Acoustic"
2020	aiMless	1. "An Apology (intro)"; 2. "Save You"; 3. "Waiting For" (feat. Jamila Woods); 4. "Call It What You Want"; 5. "Hazel Chandeliers"; 6. "All I Wanna Do (Voice Memo)"

=== Albums ===
Release date	Album name	Song name
2021	Thicker Than Water	1. "Follow the Light"; 2. "Niagara Falls"; 3. "Human"; 4. "Fix Me"; 5. "Greed"; 6. "Lullaby"; 7. "Thicker Than Water"; 8. "How You Like It"; 9. "Thank You"
2023	U Street Anthology	1. "Northeast (Intro)"; 2. "The Candy Lady"; 3. "AM/FM"; 4. "Forever in a Song"; 5. "Forget Me" (feat. Kiah Victoria); 6. "Blessed"; 7. "Death of the Author"; 8. "Love & Basketball"; 9. 12th & i (Interlude)"; 10. "Water My Heart" (feat. Mereba); 11. "Monuments"; 12. "Glory Days"; 13. "Forgiveness (Outro)"
2026	Is There Anybody Home?	1. Intro - Might as Well; 2. Asleep at the Wheel; 3. Friend of a Friend; 4. Walking Dead; 5. Another Life; 6. Is There Anybody Home; 7. Is It Something I Said; 8. Blessed Me With A Broken Heart; 9. Act of God / Force Majeure; 10. Love Me Better; 11. Good Bones
