= New Urban Arts =

Non-profit organization

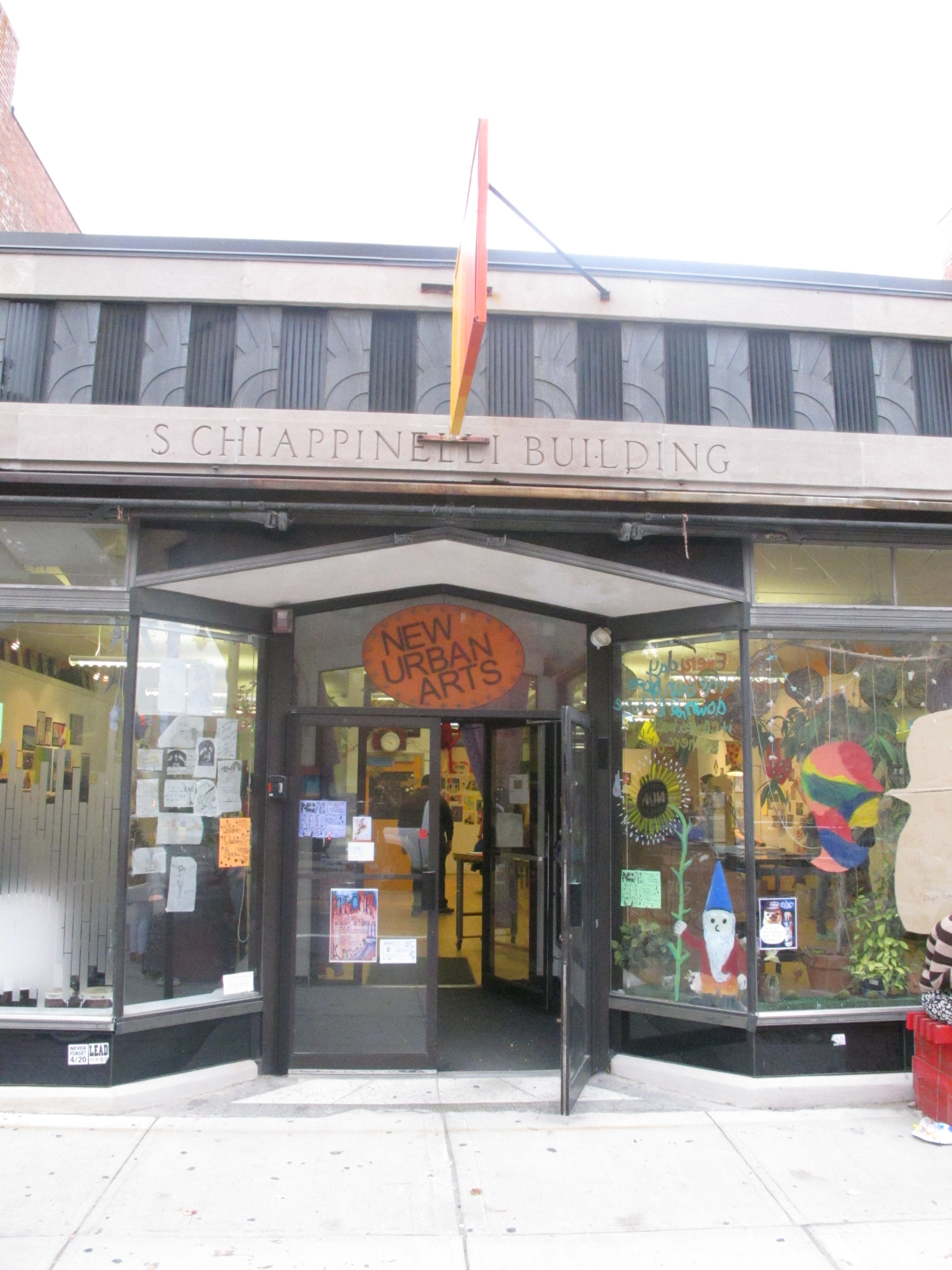
Front of New Urban Arts

New Urban Arts is a nonprofit arts organization that provides after school arts mentoring and studio space for high school students and emerging artists in Providence, Rhode Island. In 2017, students at New Urban Arts came primarily from four Providence schools: Classical High School, Central High School, the Metropolitan Regional Career and Technical Center (the Met), and Providence Career and Technical Academy (PCTA). The organization focuses on helping students develop a life-long creative practice, a summer arts inquiry program, and a leadership program that allows student participants to drive the direction of the organization. Each year, New Urban Arts serve 700 high school students, 25 emerging artists, and 2,000 visitors to the studio.

== History ==
Originally called "Project New Urban Arts," the organization was founded in October 1997 by four college students (Jullia Kim, Malaika Thorne, Marcus Civin, and Tyler Denmead) and ten high school students from Brown University, the Rhode Island School of Design, Central High School, Mount Pleasant High School, and Hope High School. In 1998, Tyler Denmead was awarded a prestigious Echoing Green Fellowship to launch New Urban Arts as a nonprofit, and he became the first executive director.

New Urban Arts began in a loft above Grace Church in downtown Providence, Rhode Island and then moved to 743 Westminster Street in Providence in 1998. In 2011, New Urban Arts announced a capital campaign and purchased, renovated, and moved to its current space at 705 Westminster Street. In 2016, with support from the Rhode Island State Council for the Arts, New Urban Arts renovated 705 Westminster Street, adding space and accessibility for a total of 6,000 square feet.

== People ==
Notable alumni, staff, and former staff members of New Urban Arts include:

- Animator Monty Oum (New Urban Arts alumni)
- University Lecturer of Arts and Creativity in Education at the Faculty of Education, University of Cambridge, Tyler Denmead (New Urban Arts co-founder)
- Professor and Chair of Art, University of Nevada, Las Vegas, Marcus Civin (New Urban Arts co-founder)
- Artist and 2019 RISD Museum Fellow Dana Heng (New Urban Arts alumni and resident artist)
- Musician and member of band Javelin Tom Van Buskirk (New Urban Arts resident artist)
- Singer, songwriter, and poet Jamila Woods (former New Urban Arts volunteer)
- Downtown Boys, punk band (New Urban Arts mentors)
- Rhode Island community advocate, Marvin Ronning (former New Urban Arts board member)

Executive Directors:

- Tyler Denmead, 1998–2007
- Tamara Kaplan (Interim Director), 2007–2008
- Jason Yoon, 2008–2012
- Elia Gurna, 2013–2014
- Daniel Schleifer, 2015–present

== Programs ==
Central to New Urban Arts is the Youth Mentorship in the Arts program, which pairs adult artists with small groups of students for after school art making. Artist mentors include both volunteers and staff, known as resident artist mentors. New Urban Arts supports volunteer artist mentors through a Professional Development Program and the students through leadership programs (the Studio Team Advisory Board), postsecondary advising, and tutoring. Summer programs include paid internships, arts inquiry explorations, an Untitlement program that explores identities, and open studio time. In 2017, New Urban Arts and Central High School began a collaboration called NUA Knights, which includes arts programming at the school. During the COVID-19 pandemic, New Urban Arts arranged for the delivery of arts supplies to students and mentors.

== Awards ==
In 2009, New Urban Arts received a Coming Up Taller Award presented by Michelle Obama at the White House. These awards "recognize exemplary arts and humanities programs which foster young people's intellectual and creative development."

Another national award came in 2008 (followed by renewals in 2013 and 2018) when the Rhode Island Department of Education named New Urban Arts a 21st Century Community Learning Center.

The Initiative for Nonprofit Excellence of the Rhode Island Foundation and Blue Cross & Blue Shield of Rhode Island awarded New Urban Arts a Best Practices Award in Board Governance in 2013.

Emily Ustach, Deputy Director, was named a National Institute on Out-of-School Time Fellow for 2017–2019.

== Influential Ideas ==
The ideas and practices developed in New Urban Arts over more than twenty years have been very influential. In a recent book, The Creative Underclass: Youth, Race and the Gentrifying City, founding director Tyler Denmead provides an ethnography of New Urban Arts in the beginning of the twentieth century and ties student expectations to local and national public policy initiatives. Susan Smulyan, a Brown University professor and former Board Chair at New Urban Arts, writes about the organization and what it can teach the new academic field of public humanities in an essay in an anthology, Doing Public Humanities. Staff and mentors have written hands-on essays, most recently Deputy Director Emily Ustach who describes “Flexibility and Fidelity in a Drop-In, After School Art Studio Program” in Afterschool Matters.
