= Matthew Pratt Guterl =

Education
- Education: Rutgers University (PhD); Richard Stockton College (BA)

Philosophical work
- Institutions: Brown University; Indiana University; Washington State University; St. John's University
- Main interests: Africana studies, American studies

Matthew Pratt Guterl is the L. Herbert Ballou University Professor of Africana Studies and American Studies at Brown University. Before his arrival at Brown University, Guterl was the James Rudy Professor of American Studies and History at Indiana University and chair of the department of American Studies. He is the author of five books and the co-author of another, and has written for The Guardian, The New Republic, The Chronicle of Higher Education, and Inside Higher Education. Guterl appeared in the documentary Race: the Power of an Illusion.

In March 2025, Guterl was named the Vice President for Diversity and Inclusion at Brown University. "To be the vice president for diversity and inclusion at this moment," he wrote in the Brown Alumni Magazine, "is an impossible contradiction. At its core, this office represents the driving need for grace, decency, and kindness in any living and learning community. It also reflects the perverse, tragic absence of the same. "

== Background ==
Guterl graduated from Richard Stockton College in 1993 with a B.A. in Historical Studies, and in 1999 from Rutgers University with a Ph.D. in History. At Rutgers, Guterl wrote his dissertation under the supervision of David Levering Lewis. Prior to working at Indiana University, Guterl was an Assistant Professor of Comparative American Cultures at Washington State University.

He has written extensively about growing up in New Jersey in the 1970s as a member of a large, multiracial, adoptive family, most particularly in the memoir, Skinfolk, published in 2023 and named a "Best of 2023" by Kirkus Reviews. Chloé Cooper Jones, reviewing it in the New York Times, described Skinfolk as an "ambitious, intellectually searching" memoir, revealing "how racial prejudice flows within and around the family and how this engulfing tide cannot be stemmed by good intentions, nor by fierce and protective familial love."

== Writings ==
Describing himself as "an historian of race and nation, and a scholar of African American, American, and World histories," Guterl's work has shifted over time across subfields and specializations: his first book was on the Progressive Era North, while his second book was on the Civil War Era South, and his more recent work is focused on the post-World War II era. His work is also transnational in scope and topic, and he often draws on archives outside of the United States.

Guterl is the author of several books, each taking up the common histories of race and nation and class. His first, The Color of Race in America, 1900-1940, was published by Harvard University Press in 2001. That book is a narrative of the shifting racial classifications in New York City, as witnessed by the African American civil rights leader W.E.B. Du Bois, the Irish American nationalist Daniel Cohalan, the Nordic supremacist and armchair racial scientist Madison Grant, and the mixed-race novelist Jean Toomer.

The Color of Race in America won a "Best Book" award from the American Political Science Association. It was reviewed in the Los Angeles Times and the Economist, among other venues.

His second, American Mediterranean: Southern Slaveholders in the Age of Emancipation, was published by Harvard University Press in 2008. Therein, he traces the rise and fall of Southern slaveholding against a hemispheric backdrop, suggesting that the Old South was tightly connected to the Caribbean, the West Indies, and even South America, and that the Civil War fundamentally changed this relationship.

American Mediterranean received honorable mention in the competition for the 2009 Gordon K. and Sybil Lewis Award, given by the Caribbean Studies Association.

A third book, Seeing Race in Modern America, was published in the Fall of 2013 by the University of North Carolina Press, and considers the history of racial sight over the past two hundred years. Framing the front and back of the book with a critique of racial profiling, Guterl suggests that the practice of seeing race is more commonplace than we think, and that unjust policing tactics share much with other, apparently benign racial sightlines, from narratives about multiracial adoption to platoon movies to silhouetting to debates about mixed-race children.

His biography of the famous African American singer and performer, Josephine Baker, published in 2014 by Harvard University Press, focuses on her multiracial, transnational, adopted family in France and the historical contexts of decolonization, civil and human rights, liberalism and utopianism. Recently, he has described this book as a challenge, as well, to the notion of "nation-time" and conventional periodizations in American and world history.

In the spring of 2015, Guterl and his co-author, Caroline Field Levander, released Hotel Life, published by the University of North Carolina Press, a book about the social and political work of hotels in contemporary American culture. Together, they describe their writing partnership as "a third way," or "a new inquiry space, a space we might both imaginatively inhabit."

Hotel Life was excerpted by Slate and Business Insider. Writing together in the New York Times about the 2015 United States Supreme Court decision in Los Angeles v. Patel, they concluded that the contradictions of the public "need-to-know" and the private requirement for concealment would likely never be fully resolved, and that "the hotel fascinates us because it sits at the intersection of public and private life. People will always find some of these opportunities to be threatening or dangerous."

Guterl is also the co-editor (with James T. Campbell and Robert G. Lee) of Race, Nation, and Empire in American History, published in 2007. Guterl is also the editor of proposed Oxford Handbook on the History of Race.

== Awards ==
Guterl was the 2010 winner of the Mary Turpie Prize for Distinguished Teaching, Advising, and Program Development, from the American Studies Association. In that same year, he was given the Distinguished Alumni Award from the School of Arts and Humanities, Richard Stockton College of New Jersey. In 2023, he was given the President's Award for Excellence in Faculty Governance by Brown University. He is a "Distinguished Lecturer" for the Organization of American Historians, and an elected member of the Society of American Historians. He has also been awarded fellowships from the John Simon Guggenheim Memorial Foundation, the Humanities Research Center, Rice University, the Center for the Study of Race and Ethnicity in America, Brown University, the National Museum of American History, Smithsonian Institution, the Gilder Lehrman Center, Yale University, and the Library Company of Philadelphia.
