= Marvin Ronning =

Community advocate

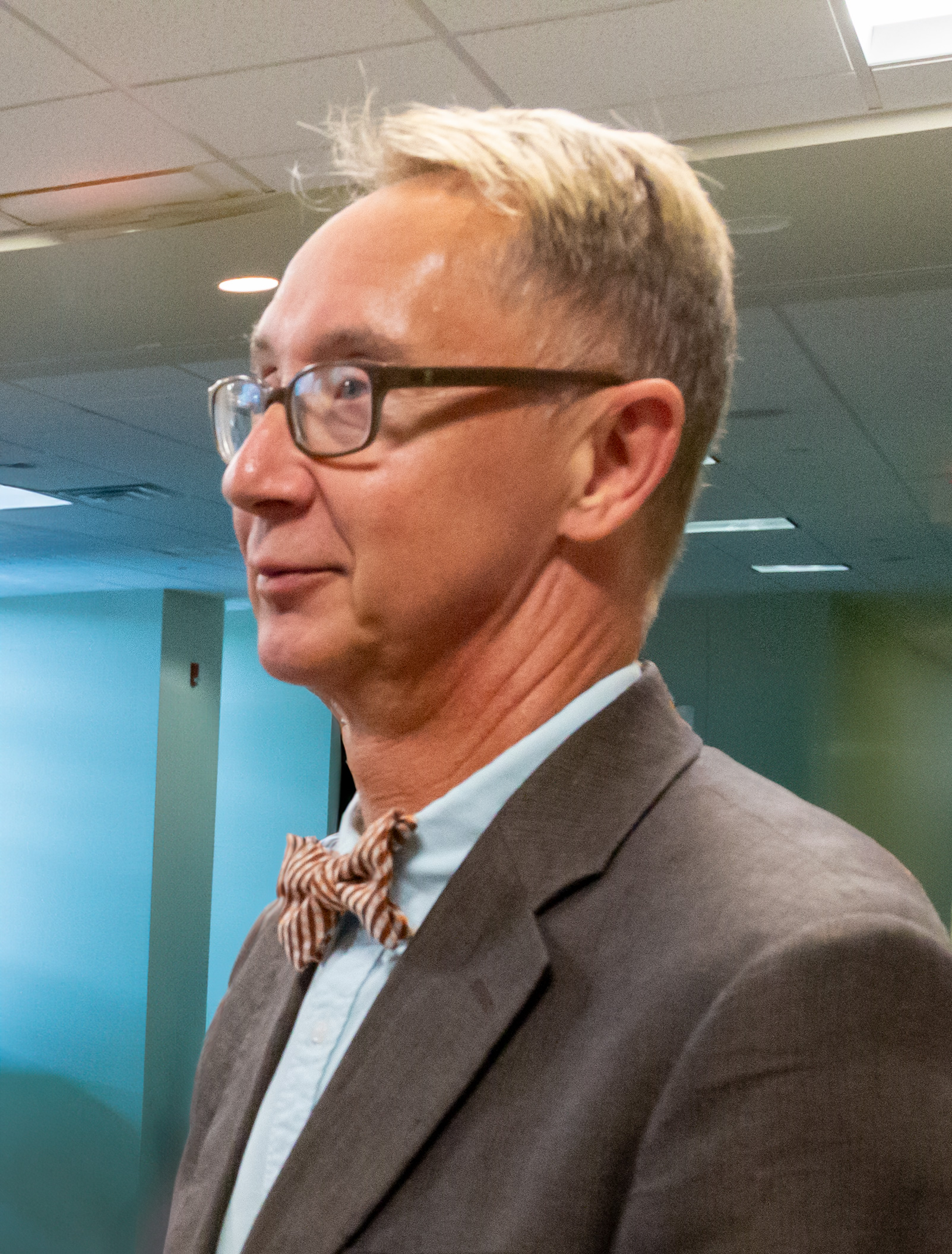
- Born: December 18, 1961; Montana, US
- Died: November 7, 2022 (aged 60); Providence, Rhode Island, US
- Education: Master of Education, Harvard University
- Alma mater: Pacific Lutheran University
- Years active: 2010-2022
- Employer: Rhode Island Free Clinic
- Organization: Save the Bay

Marvin Ronning (December 18, 1961 – November 7, 2022) was a community advocate and the director of the Rhode Island Free Clinic (RIFC).

== Advocacy ==
=== Education ===
Ronning was a guest lecturer and mentor at several universities. He served as an advisor to students at Brown University School of Public Health and many other community organizations.

Ronning was on the board of, and frequently donated to, the youth arts program, New Urban Arts. He was the board chair of The Learning Community school in Central Falls. He was a supporter of the nonprofit, Big Picture Learning, which works to increase equity and innovation in public education.

=== Environment ===
Before joining the Rhode Island Free Clinic, Ronning worked as the director of project planning and administration at Save the Bay. He helped make local waterfronts and environmental programming more accessible to urban communities in Rhode Island through his contributions to the construction of the Bay Center on Fields Point.

== Rhode Island Free Clinic ==
Rhode Island Free Clinic was founded in 1999. It is run by community partners, volunteers, and supporters. The clinic serves thousands of patients and conducts around 11,000 appointments a year. It provides more than 25 different specialties and services to adults who can't afford treatment or have no insurance.

For twelve years, Ronning was a senior administrator at the RIFC. Ronning transformed RIFC into a training site for potential health care professionals, created a network of academic partnerships with every higher education institution in the state, built a dental clinic, and served as Director of the Northern RI Area Health Education Center. He partnered with Arts Connection Rhode Island to incorporate art in the clinic, and stated the art represented the beauty and dignity of the overall facility. Ronning was RIFC’s longest tenured employee.

== Death ==
Ronning died suddenly on November 7, 2022. Before he died, he focused greatly on succession planning for the Rhode Island Free Clinic, educating staff on management practices and creating a shared network of files that provided guidance and infrastructure. An endowed fund to honor his legacy was created through the Rhode Island Foundation.
