= Jamila Woods =

American singer-songwriter and poet (born 1989)

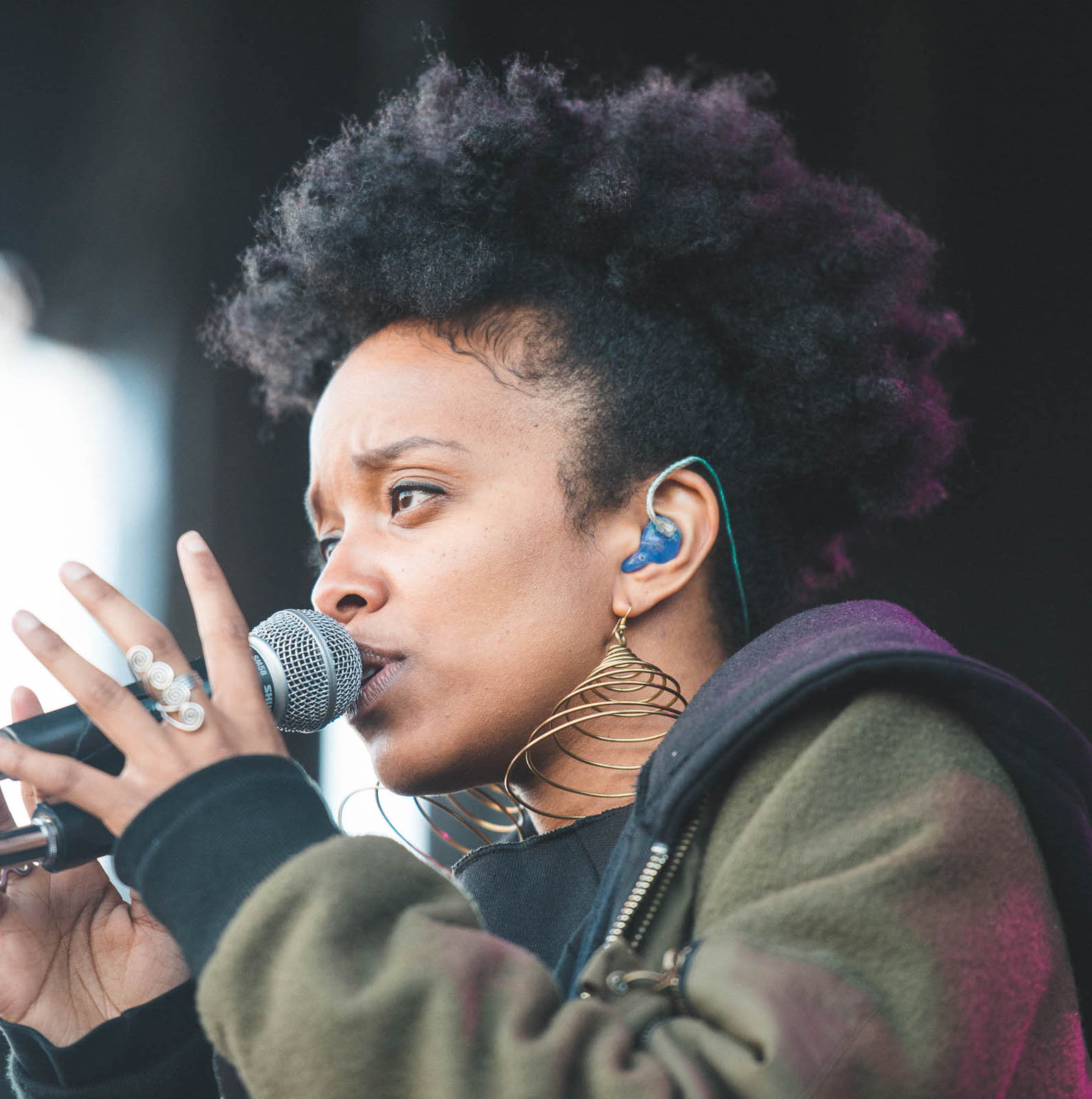
- Woods in 2018

Background information
- Born: October 6, 1989 (age 37); Chicago, Illinois, U.S.
- Genres: R&B; neo soul; soul; hip hop
- Occupations: Singer-songwriter; dancer; poet
- Years active: 2012–present
- Label: Jagjaguwar
- Website: www.jamila-woods.com

Jamila Abidemi Woods (born October 6, 1989) is an American singer, songwriter and poet based in Chicago, Illinois. Her work focuses on themes of Black ancestry, Black feminism, and Black identity, with recurring emphases on self-love and the City of Chicago.

== Early life and education ==
Woods was born on October 6, 1989, in Chicago, Illinois. She is a graduate of St. Ignatius College Prep and Brown University, where she received a BA in Africana Studies and Theater & Performance Studies.

== Career ==
=== Poetry ===
In 2012, Jamila Woods published her first chapbook, entitled The Truth About Dolls. Her work can be found in the anthologies The Breakbeat Poets: New American Poetry in the Age of Hip-Hop (2015), Courage: Daring Poems for Gutsy Girls (2014), and The UnCommon Core: Contemporary Poems for Learning & Living (2013). Her influences include Lucille Clifton, Gwendolyn Brooks, Toni Morrison, and Frida Kahlo.

Woods was also one of three editors of The Breakbeat Poets Volume II, entitled Black Girl Magic. The 2018 publication is an anthology of poetry by contemporary Black women, “exploring themes of beauty, unapologetic blackness, intersectionality, self-definition, and more.” Woods is a member of the Dark Noise Poetry Collective with fellow creatives Fatimah Asghar, Franny Choi, Nate Marshall, Aaron Samuels, and Danez Smith.

=== Community organizing ===
Woods was the Associate Artistic Director of Young Chicago Authors (YCA), an organization in the Chicago area dedicated to uplifting youth voices through arts, education, and mentorship. Through YCA, Woods helps to organize Louder Than a Bomb, the world's largest youth poetry slam festival. She also facilitates poetry workshops and creates curriculum for Chicago Public Schools. While in Providence, Woods served as a volunteer at non-profit arts center New Urban Arts.

=== Music ===
After completing studies at Brown, Woods and classmate Owen Hill formed soul-pop band Milo and Otis, or M&O, which released two albums: The Joy in 2012 and Almost Us in 2014. The song "Lift Up" on the band's debut album features Chance the Rapper. M&O disbanded in 2014. Woods is widely known for her other collaborative works with Chance the Rapper on the hit song "Sunday Candy" from the album Surf as well as "Blessings" from Coloring Book. Woods is also featured on the Macklemore & Ryan Lewis song "White Privilege II". In January 2016, Woods signed to Chicago's independent hip-hop label, Closed Sessions. In that same year Woods released her debut album Heavn on her SoundCloud page on July 11, 2016 to critical acclaim. The album features collaborations with Chance the Rapper, Noname, Saba, Lorine Chia, Kweku Collins and Donnie Trumpet. Heavn was ranked as the 36th best album of 2016 by Pitchfork. Heavn features a variety of producers, including oddCouple, a fellow Closed Sessions signee who produced five of the album's 12 tracks. In 2017, Woods partners with Jagjaguwar and Closed Sessions to re-release the album.

Jamila released her second album Legacy! Legacy! via Jagjaguwar on May 10, 2019 to rave reviews. Each song is named after a prolific black creator and the album features collaborations with Nitty Scott, Saba, theMIND, Jasminfire, and Nico Segal. Legacy! Legacy! includes hook song "Eartha" that assists in displaying the history and lineage of a country obsessed with forgetting. Released along with "Legacy! Legacy!" were videos for her songs "SONIA/FRIDA".

In early 2020, Woods performed as the opening act for the R&B singer Raphael Saadiq's Jimmy Lee Tour. The same year, she also collaborated with R&B singer rum.gold to release the song Waiting For.

== Bibliography ==
=== Poems ===
- "Frida Kahlo to Diego, or the Ways My Body Feels Empty Sometimes", Muzzle Magazine, 2012
- "Pigeon Man", Radius Lit, 2012
- "Daddy Dozens", Poetry Foundation, 2015
- "Beverly, Huh.", Poetry Foundation, 2015
- "Coconut Oil Kind of Woman", Winter Tangerine Review: Hands Up Don’t Shoot, 2015
- "Bird's Nest", Winter Tangerine Review: Hands Up Don't Shoot, 2015
- "In Security or on Being Touched Without Permission", Winter Tangerine Review: Hands Up Don’t Shoot, 2015
- "How Our Hair Got This Way", Winter Tangerine Review: Hands Up Don't Shoot, 2015
- "Blk Grl Art", The Offing, 2016
- "Ghazal for White Hen Pantry", Poetry Foundation, 2015
- "Ode to Herb Kent", Poetry Foundation, 2015

=== Plays ===
- "theSHARK", Muzzle Magazine, 2012

=== Anthologies ===
- The UnCommon Core: Contemporary Poems for Learning Living (2013)
- Courage: Daring Poems for Gutsy Girls (2014)
- The Breakbeat Poets: New American Poetry in the Age of Hip-Hop (2015)
- The BreakBeat Poets: Black Girl Magic (2018)
- The End of Chiraq: A Literary Mixtape (2018)

=== Chapbooks ===
- Monsters of Metal, 2010
- The Truth About Dolls, 2012

== Discography ==
=== Studio albums ===
List of studio albums, with selected details
Title	Album details
Heavn	Released: July 7, 2016; Label: Closed Sessions, Jagjaguwar; Format: CD, LP, digital download, streaming
Legacy! Legacy!	Released: May 10, 2019; Label: Jagjaguwar; Format: CD, LP, digital download, streaming, cassette
Water Made Us	Released: October 13, 2023; Label: Jagjaguwar; Format: CD, LP, digital download, streaming, cassette

=== Singles ===
- "Blk Girl Soldier" (2016)
- "Holy" (2017)
- "LSD" featuring Chance the Rapper [RP Boo Remix] (2017)
- "Giovanni" (2018)
- "Zora" (2019)
- "Eartha" (2019)
- "Baldwin" (2019)
- "Zora" [Live] (2020)
- "Sula" [Hardcover] (2020)
- "Sula" [Paperback] (2020)
- "Tiny Garden" featuring duendita (2023) – No. 29 Adult Alternative Airplay

== Music videos ==
- "Blk Girl Soldier" (2016)
- "Holy" (2017)
- "LSD" featuring Chance the Rapper (2017)
- "Giovanni" (2018)
- "Zora" (2019)
- "Eartha" (2019)
- "Baldwin" (2019)
- "Sula (Hardcover)" (2020)
- "Tiny Garden" featuring duendita (2023)
