= Alfred Brophy =

American lawyer

- Education: University of Pennsylvania (BA); Columbia University (JD); Harvard University (PhD)
- Occupation: Legal scholar
- Employer: University of Alabama

Alfred L. Brophy is an American legal scholar. He is retired. He held the Paul and Charlene Jones Chair in law at the University of Alabama from 2017 to 2019.

== Early life ==
Brophy was born in Champaign, Illinois. He graduated summa cum laude from the University of Pennsylvania, where he earned a bachelor of arts degree. He earned a J.D. from Columbia University, where he was an editor of the Columbia Law Review, and a Ph.D. from Harvard University, where he held a Woodrow Wilson Foundation Fellowship.

== Career ==
Brophy was a law clerk to John Butzner of the United States Court of Appeals for the Fourth Circuit and practiced law with Skadden, Arps, Slate, Meagher & Flom in New York.

He taught at the University of North Carolina School of Law from 2008 to 2017, where he became the Judge John J. Parker Distinguished Professor of Law. He has held the Paul and Charlene Jones Chair in law at the University of Alabama from 2017 to 2019. He has a intracranial hemorrhage stroke and is retired now.

Brophy is the author of several books, co-author of two casebooks, and co-editor of three other volumes. He has been the co-editor of the American Journal of Legal History from 2016 to 2018.

In August 2017, in the wake of the Unite the Right rally in Charlottesville, Virginia, Brophy argued that Confederate monuments should remain, as "removal facilitates forgetting." Though at certain points he has supported renaming of campus buildings and also removal of some monuments, he is generally against removal of monuments and renaming. Instead, he has argued for counter-monuments and for more contextualization of monuments.

== Works ==
- Reconstructing the Dreamland: The Tulsa Race Riot of 1921 (2002)
- Reparations Pro and Con (2006)
- Transformations in American Legal History (co-editor, 2009 and 2010)
- Integrating Spaces: Property Law and Race (co-author, 2011)
- Companion to American Legal History (co-editor, 2013)
- University, Court, and Slave: Proslavey Thought in Southern Colleges and Courts and the Coming of Civil War (2016)
- Experiencing Trusts and Estates (co-author 2017) (co-author, 2nd ed. 2021)
- Slavery and the University: Histories and Legacies (co-editor, 2019)
- Francis Daniel Pastorius Reader: Writings by an Early American Polymath (associate editor, 2019)
