= Susan Smulyan =

- Education: Yale University
- Employer: Brown University
- Notable work: Selling Radio (1994); Popular Ideologies (2007); Major Problems in American Popular Culture (2011); Doing Public Humanities (2020)
- Title: Professor

Susan Smulyan is professor of American Studies and former director of the John Nicholas Brown Center for Public Humanities and Cultural Heritage at Brown University. A graduate of Yale University, Smulyan's research focuses on U.S. popular culture in the 20th century.

== Early life and education ==
Smulyan attended Yale University, where she earned a BA (1975), MA (1980), and PhD (1985).

== Career ==
Smulyan taught at University of Texas at San Antonio from 1985 until 1988, when she joined the Department of American Civilization (later renamed American Studies) at Brown University. She is professor of American Studies and director of the John Nicholas Brown Center for Public Humanities and Cultural Heritage at Brown.

Smulyan's work focuses on popular culture in the United States in the 20th century. Her first book, Selling Radio: The Commercialization of American Broadcasting, 1920-1934, described the rise of advertising on the medium of radio. Reviewing the book for the journal American Journalism, William James Ryan suggested that Smulyan made an important contribution in documenting the historical contingency (rather than inevitability) of this development: that, per Ryan, "American radio did not need to become what it became." In The Business History Review, Regina Lee Blaszczyk emphasized Smulyan's "savvy borrowing of research methods and theories from several fields" to develop this investigation.

Smulyan has also served as chair of the board of directors of New Urban Arts, a youth mentoring program in Rhode Island.

=== Doing Public Humanities (2020) ===
In July 2020, Routledge published Smulyan's Doing Public Humanities, an edited collection of essays, which "explores the cultural landscape from disruptive events to websites, from tours to exhibits, from after school arts programs to archives", providing a broad perspective of the work of public humanities. This work builds on Smulyan's tenure as the director of the John Nicholas Brown Center for Public Humanities and Cultural Heritage at Brown University and features case studies written by other scholars affiliated with the center.

Like Smulyan's earlier work, Doing Public Humanities is interdisciplinary and combines a practitioner's focus on case studies with the scholar's more abstract and theoretical approach. Smulyan's own essay, "What Can the Public Arts Teach the Public Humanities", draws on her work with an after school arts program in Providence, RI—New Urban Arts. Other contributors present a public humanities practice that encourages social justice and explores the intersectionalities of race, class, gender, and sexualities.

== Works ==
- Selling Radio: The Commercialization of American Broadcasting, 1920-1934 (Smithsonian Institution Press, 1994)
- Popular Ideologies: Mass Culture at Mid-Century (University of Pennsylvania Press, 2007)
- ed., Major Problems in American Popular Culture, with Kathleen Franz (Wadsworth Cengage Learning, 2011)
- ed., Doing Public Humanities (Routledge, 2020)
