= Chance the Rapper =

American rapper (born 1993)

- Chance the Rapper in 2026
- Born: Chancelor Jonathan Bennett; April 16, 1993 (age 33); Chicago, Illinois, U.S.
- Other name: Chano
- Occupations: Rapper; singer; songwriter; record producer; activist
- Years active: 2011–present
- Organization: SocialWorks
- Works: Discography; production
- Spouse: Kirsten Corley (m. 2019; div. 2025)
- Children: 3
- Relatives: Taylor Bennett (brother)
- Awards: Full list
- Musical career
- Genres: Midwestern hip-hop; alternative hip hop
- Instruments: Vocals
- Formerly of: Savemoney; The Social Experiment
- Website: chanceraps.com chancestuff.com

Chancelor Jonathan Bennett (born April 16, 1993), known professionally as Chance the Rapper, is an American rapper. He gained widespread recognition with his second mixtape, Acid Rap (2013), which helped establish him as a leading figure in Chicago hip-hop and among independent artists.

His third mixtape, Coloring Book (2016), received critical acclaim and became the first streaming-only project to win the Grammy Award for Best Rap Album at the 59th Annual Grammy Awards, while its single "No Problem" (featuring 2 Chainz and Lil Wayne) won Best Rap Performance. His debut album, The Big Day (2019), peaked at number two on the Billboard 200. He released his second album, Star Line, in 2025.

As a featured artist, he has appeared on songs including "Ultralight Beam" by Kanye West and the chart-topping single "I'm the One" by DJ Khaled. Bennett is also a member of the Chicago-based collective Savemoney and a lead vocalist for the hip hop band the Social Experiment. Outside of music, he has worked in television and film, including serving as a judge on the Netflix series Rhythm + Flow and as a coach on The Voice. He received a Primetime Emmy Award nomination for writing the song "Last Christmas", performed during his appearance on Saturday Night Live in 2017.

His accolades include three Grammy Awards (including Best New Artist), three BET Awards, and a Soul Train Music Award. He is among the highest-grossing hip-hop touring artists and has also pursued philanthropic efforts, including advocating for the public education system in Chicago.

== Early life ==
Chancelor Jonathan Bennett was born on April 16, 1993, in Chicago, Illinois. His father, Ken Williams-Bennett, was an aide to the late Chicago mayor Harold Washington and then-senator Barack Obama. His mother, Lisa, worked for the Illinois attorney general. Bennett grew up in the middle-class neighborhood of West Chatham on Chicago's South Side. When he was sixteen, Bennett's father began to work in the Department of Labor during President Obama's first term. Bennett personally met Obama in his youth and talked about his aspirations to be a rapper, to which Obama responded with "word". Bennett was originally going to move to Washington, D.C., following Obama's win in the 2008 presidential election, although those plans eventually fell through. Bennett attended Jones College Prep High School where he was a member of the Jewish Student Union.

Bennett's interest in music began with Michael Jackson, who he exclusively listened to on cassettes until the fifth grade. Growing up, Bennett's parents were constantly playing music, including Billie Holiday, Sam Cooke and other artists in the jazz and gospel genres. Bennett began listening to hip-hop after hearing "Through the Wire" by Kanye West on the radio while walking through Hyde Park. After finding out the song was on West's debut album The College Dropout, Bennett purchased the album, making it the first hip-hop album that Bennett listened to. Bennett considers West a huge influence on him and has said that he was inspired to begin rapping by West. Bennett and West met each other in August 2014 at Bonnaroo Music Festival.

Bennett began rapping in the sixth grade when his cousin let him start using his studio. In his freshman year at Jones College Prep High School, Bennett formed the hip-hop duo Instrumentality alongside a friend. Many of Chance's earliest performances took place at the YOUmedia Lyricist Loft at Harold Washington Library in Chicago. After placing second in a local songwriting contest, Bennett met then-Chicago Mayor, Richard M. Daley who enjoyed his music. Bennett spent most of his junior year and a small amount of his senior year writing a draft for his debut project, 10 Day, which was later released after Bennett was suspended for ten days after being caught smoking cannabis.

== Music career ==
=== 2011–2012: Career beginnings and 10 Day ===
At Jones College Prep High School, some of Bennett's teachers ridiculed his aspirations to become a musician. In 2011 during his school year, following a 10-day suspension for marijuana possession on campus, he recorded his first full-length project in a span of 8 months, a mixtape titled 10 Day (also known as #10Day). In December 2011, he released a song titled "Windows", and publicly announced his 10 Day project. In February 2012, Bennett was highlighted as one of Complex magazine's "10 New Chicago Rappers to Watch Out For". He says he spent "about eight months recording, writing, and making connections off of the hunger to put out something". He released the mixtape on April 3, 2012, and it has since been downloaded over 500,000 times via mixtape-sharing site DatPiff. The mixtape was well-received locally and helped him make connections with producers such as Chuck Inglish, Kenny Jame$, and Blended Babies. The mixtape grabbed the attention of Forbes magazine, which featured it in the publication's Cheap Tunes column.

=== 2012–2015: Acid Rap and The Social Experiment ===
In July 2012, Bennett appeared on Childish Gambino's sixth mixtape, Royalty, on the track "They Don't Like Me". Gambino asked Bennett to join him on his first concert tour of North America as his opening act.

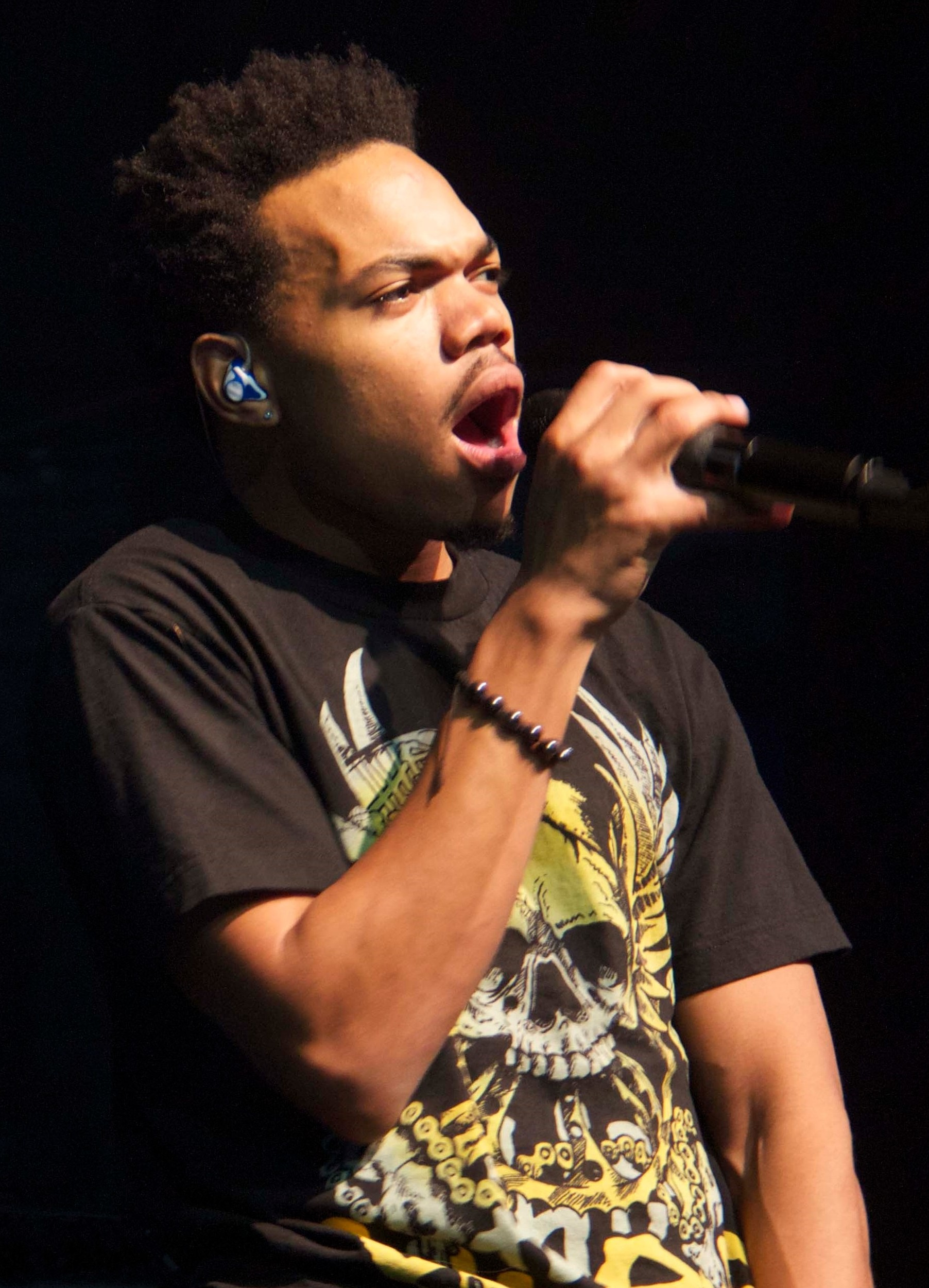
Bennett performing in 2013

On April 30, 2013, Bennett released his second mixtape, Acid Rap, on DatPiff. The record has been downloaded over 1.5 million times. He got Twista, Vic Mensa, Saba, BJ the Chicago Kid, Action Bronson, Childish Gambino, and Ab-Soul to make guest appearances. Acid Rap was well received by critics. At Metacritic, the mixtape received an average score of 86, based on 21 critics, which indicates "universal acclaim". It was nominated for Best Mixtape at the 2013 BET Hip Hop Awards. On May 6, 2013, the song "Paranoia" (produced by Nosaj Thing), after initially being featured as a hidden track on Acid Rap, was released as a contribution to Yours Truly and Adidas originals' "Songs from Scratch" series. In June 2013, Bennett was featured in a commercial for MySpace as part of their relaunch, alongside fellow American rappers Mac Miller, Pharrell Williams and Schoolboy Q, among others. In July 2013, Acid Rap debuted at number 63 on the Billboard Top R&B/Hip-Hop Albums chart, due to downloads on iTunes and Amazon. In August 2013, Bennett performed at the Chicago music festival Lollapalooza. Acid Rap was listed on multiple 50 best albums of 2013 lists, including 26th for Rolling Stone, 12th on Pitchfork's list, and ranked 4th by Complex. It was also listed as one of NPR Music's 50 Favorite Albums of 2013. Bennett began his Social Experiment Tour in Champaign, Illinois, on October 25, 2013, lasting until December 19, 2013.

In March 2014, Bennett appeared in a shoppable online video for Dockers, promoting the brand's spring line, in which Bennett talks his style, love for creating music, and how it feels to live in Los Angeles. On May 5, 2014, XXL revealed Bennett was included in their annual freshman class, alongside fellow up-and-comers Isaiah Rashad, Ty Dolla $ign, Rich Homie Quan, Vic Mensa, August Alsina, Troy Ave, Kevin Gates, Lil Bibby, Jon Connor, Lil Durk and Jarren Benton. During Fall 2014, Bennett and other artists participated in Verge Campus tour. In November 2014, Bennett was presented Chicago's "Outstanding Youth of the Year Award" by Mayor Rahm Emanuel.

In January 2015, Bennett was listed number 7 on the "Forbes 30 Under 30" 2015 music list. In March 2015, Bennett released a short film called Mr. Happy, which was directed by Colin Tilley. Mr. Happy centers around the main character, named Victor, who is struggling from depression and was attempting to kill himself. After many suicide attempts, he discovers Mr. Happy. Along with boxer Mike Tyson, Bennett worked with Madonna to write and feature on the track "Iconic" released that same month. On April 30, 2015, Bennett gave a lecture at Harvard University's Hiphop Archive & Research Institute. Just before midnight on May 28, 2015, Surf was released for free on the American iTunes store as an iTunes Exclusive. The album received high acclaim from music critics, receiving an aggregate score of 86 on review site Metacritic, which indicates "universal acclaim", based on 17 reviews. In June 2015, Bennett performed at the Bonnaroo Music Festival in the super jam concert collection. He also made a guest performance with fellow rapper Kendrick Lamar, on stage with Earth, Wind & Fire. On July 19, 2015, Bennett and Lil B announced that they recorded a collaborative mixtape. The two rappers released it on August 5, titled Free (Based Freestyles Mixtape).

On October 13, 2015, Bennett released a video for a new song, titled "Family Matters", on his website. The song, which shares the same name as his fall 2015 tour with D.R.A.M., Metro Boomin, Towkio (and Hiatus Kaiyote on select dates), is a rework of the Kanye West song "Family Business" from his 2004 album The College Dropout. A few days before this, a video surfaced online of Bennett performing a new song live, ending the song by saying the words "third mixtape", leading many to believe the wait might be coming to a close for his next release. On October 27, 2015, Bennett premiered a new song, titled "Angels" featuring Saba, on The Late Show with Stephen Colbert. On December 12, 2015, Bennett performed on Saturday Night Live, on a new song, titled "Somewhere in Paradise", which featured Jeremih and fellow Chicago artist R. Kelly. The song was later pulled from circulation in wake of the airing of the television documentary, Surviving R. Kelly in 2019, which exposed new allegations of sexual misconduct and sexual assault by Kelly. Bennett expressed his regret of working with Kelly, and apologized with a statement on Twitter.

=== 2016–2021: Coloring Book and The Big Day ===
In 2016, Bennett was a prominent figure on Kanye West's album The Life of Pablo, co-writing and appearing on several tracks, including "Ultralight Beam", "Father Stretch My Hands Pt. 1", "Famous", "Feedback", and "Waves". According to West, the album's release was delayed due to Bennett's desire for "Waves" to make the album's final cut. Bennett was also featured on a track titled "Need To Know" on Macklemore & Ryan Lewis's album This Unruly Mess I've Made. The following March, Bennett was featured on Skrillex's remix of Hundred Waters' "Show Me Love". On April 16, 2016, Bennett and other musicians, including Alicia Keys, Busta Rhymes, Janelle Monáe, and J. Cole met with President Obama at the White House to discuss the My Brother's Keeper Challenge initiative.

On May 12, 2016, Bennett's third mixtape, Coloring Book (promoted as Chance 3), was released, streaming exclusively on Apple Music. In the first week, the mixtape was streamed over 57.3 million times, which was equivalent to 38,000 units sold, debuting at number eight on the US Billboard 200 chart. It became the first release to chart solely on streams. The mixtape was met with widespread acclaim from music critics, and on review aggregator site Metacritic, received an average score of 89, based on 21 critics, which indicates "universal acclaim". On July 13, at the 2016 ESPY Awards show, along with Kareem Abdul-Jabbar, he performed a tribute song titled "I Was A Rock" for the late Muhammad Ali. On August 16, 2016, Chance wrote the single "We the People" paired in a Nike commercial titled "Unlimited Together", a film directed by Hiro Murai. A second commercial was released on October 4, by Nestlé, to promote the Kit Kat bar, with Chance starring in costume remixing their jingle. On September 15, 2016, Chance began his Magnificent Coloring World Tour in San Diego.

Bennett announced the Magnificent Coloring Tour with an event called Magnificent Coloring Day Festival at Chicago's Guaranteed Rate Field, with a line up including Lil Wayne, Young Thug, Skrillex, Tyler, the Creator and Lil Uzi Vert, taking place on September 24, 2016, being the first-ever music festival at U.S. Cellular Field. This one day festival event also featured a surprise appearance by Kanye West. Bennett launched a campaign in conjunction with rapperradio.com to get his music on the radio on August 17, 2016.

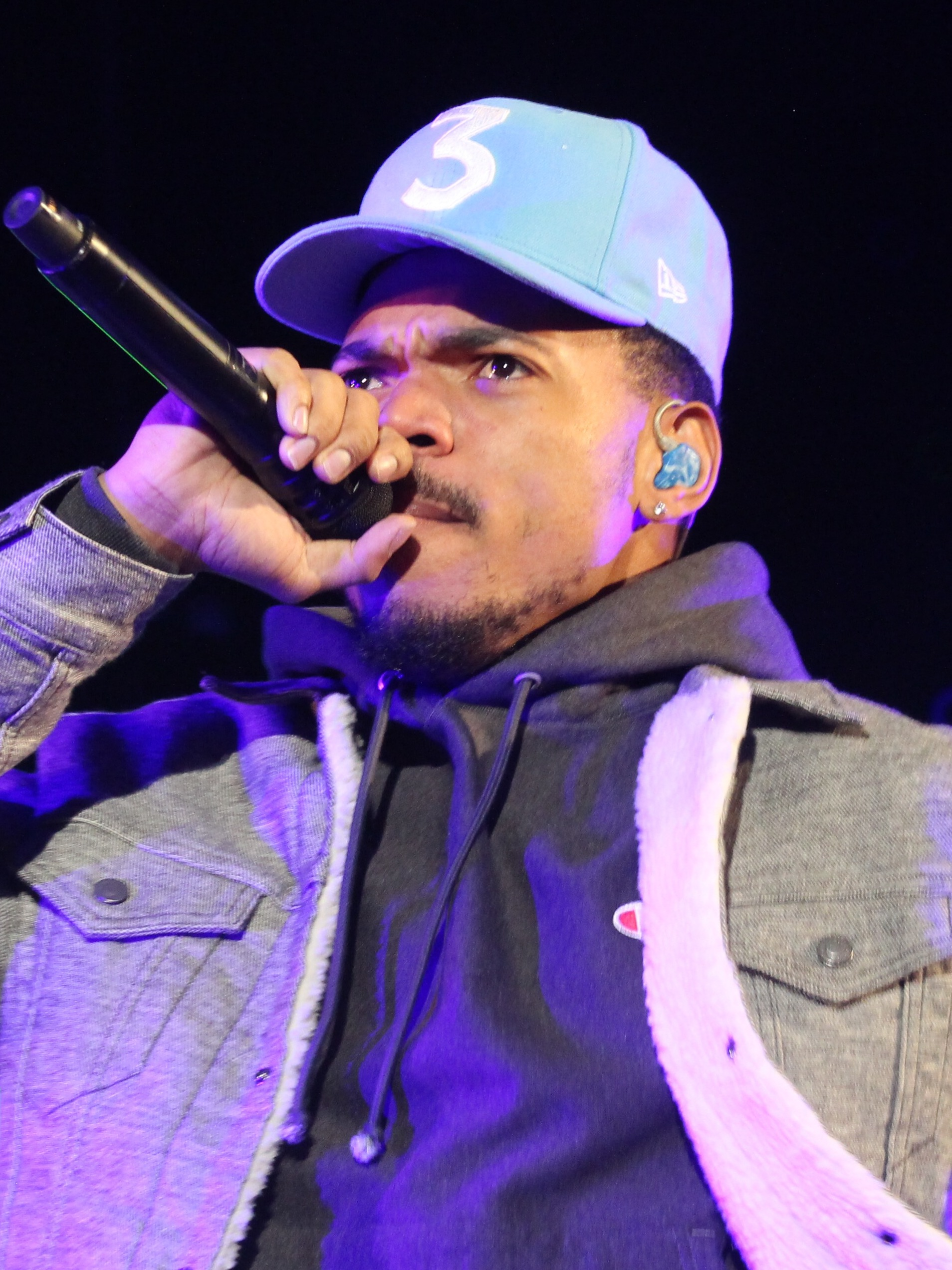
Bennett performing at Red Rocks in 2017

In September 2016, H&M solicited Bennett to headline their new campaign. In November 2016, he continued on the Magnificent Coloring World Tour, but cancelled the rest of his shows on the European leg for personal reasons. In November 2016, Bennett announced during an interview with DJ Semtex that he was working on his debut album. Bennett was offered a chance to sign with Kanye West's GOOD Music in December 2016, though he refused due to his popularity as an independent artist and the freedom of not being attached to a label. In an August interview about his debut album, Bennett said he may sell the album, a departure from his previous projects' free distribution format. After a report was leaked claiming that audio distribution platform SoundCloud was close to bankruptcy and had laid off most of its workers, Bennett had a phone call with SoundCloud CEO Alex Ljung. Following the phone call, Bennett went onto Twitter, posting that SoundCloud is "here to stay". It was later reported that Bennett was just reflecting on what Ljung had previously published in a press release following the leak. Soon after, Bennett released a SoundCloud exclusive track with Young Thug called "Big B's" to benefit the platform, a surprise move that was planned in response to the SoundCloud bankruptcy leak.

In February 2017, Bennett performed at the 59th annual Grammy Awards, receiving 7 nominations and winning 3 Grammys. His performance featured Kirk Franklin and Tamela Mann, along with a gospel choir and orchestra conducted by Tom Brooks. On July 13, Bennett performed a NPR Tiny Desk Concert where he recited an original poem. The poem, titled "The Other Side", was crafted on his ride from his hotel, in Washington, D.C., to the NPR music offices and was written with black marker on typing paper. Chance also performed, "Juke Jam", a song off of his album Coloring Book, and a cover to Stevie Wonder's song "They Won't Go When I Go" released in 1974.

In July 2017, Bennett was nominated for an Emmy Award for his song "Last Christmas" that was performed on Saturday Night Live. He shares the nomination with Kenan Thompson, Eli Brueggemann, and Will Stephen in the category for Outstanding Original Music and Lyrics. In August 2017, Bennett headlined day three of Lollapalooza at Grant Park in his hometown of Chicago. His performance drew record crowds with some estimates making it the largest attended performance in the event's history. In November 2017, Bennett curated and headlined the Obama Foundation community event at the Wintrust Arena in Chicago. The event capstoned the inaugural Obama Summit event which featured special guests including former President Barack Obama, First Lady Michelle Obama, Andra Day, Gloria Estefan, Aziz Ansari, Lena Waithe, Lin-Manuel Miranda, and more.

In 2018, he featured on "Logout", a song from Saba's album Care for Me and "Best Life" from Cardi B's debut album Invasion of Privacy, and released 4 new songs in July. Bennett performed at Mac Miller: A Celebration of Life on October 31, 2018, a tribute concert in honor of the recently passed Mac Miller. On November 29, 2018, Bennett released 2 new songs, "My Own Thing" and "The Man Who Has Everything", and announced on February 11, 2019, that his debut album would be released sometime in July of that same year. During Super Bowl LII Bennett appeared alongside The Backstreet Boys in a commercial for Doritos with the two artist performing a remix of "I Want it That Way" In May of that year Bennett was featured in Ed Sheeran's song "Cross Me" On July 26, 2019, Bennett released his debut studio album The Big Day.

In 2019, he wrote the song "True Kinda Love" for Steven Universe: The Movie alongside Rebecca Sugar, James Fauntleroy, Macie Stewart, and Julian Sanchez, with vocals being performed by Estelle and Zach Callison. In December 2019, Bennett canceled his "The Big World Tour" for the second time to spend time with his newborn daughter.

In January 2020, it was announced that Bennett will be the host of the reboot of Punk'd that will air on the streaming service Quibi.

In February 2020, Nickelodeon announced that Bennett would be the host of the 2020 Kids' Choice Awards on March 22. The entire show was later scrapped and replaced with a virtual ceremony hosted by Victoria Justice from her home, delayed to May 2 due to the COVID-19 pandemic, and with a lack of live musical performances overall due to the circumstances.

In July 2021, Bennett released Magnificent Coloring World, a concert film directed by Jake Schreier documenting a 2016 exclusive-fan performance of the Magnificent Coloring World Tour shot at Cinescape Studios in Chicago. Through his content production company House of Kicks, Bennett signed a trailblazing international distribution agreement with AMC Theatres for the film, marking the first time an individual recording artist has distributed a film through AMC.

=== 2022–present: Star Line and The Voice ===
In summer 2022, Bennett announced his forthcoming album titled Star Line Gallery and began to release several singles over the next few months including "Child of God", "Wraith" (with Vic Mensa and Smoko Ono), and "The Highs & the Lows" (with Joey Badass).

On October 11, 2022, it was announced that Bennett would be a coach on the 23rd season of The Voice in spring 2023. He didn't return as a coach for the twenty-fourth season in the fall 2023, and was replaced by John Legend, but briefly participated in the season as an advisor. In June 2023, it was announced that Bennett would return to The Voice as a coach for the 25th season in spring 2024. On April 23, 2024, he released the single "Buried Alive", announced that the project was renamed to Star Line, and that it would be released as a mixtape. In the song, he addresses various aspects of his life including his latest divorce, his fallout with his former manager, and criticisms he has faced in recent years. Bennett is scheduled to headline the "And We Back Tour" in 2025 in support of the album.

Star Line was ultimately released on August 15, 2025, preceded by the lead single "Tree" featuring Lil Wayne and Smino. Produced largely with longtime collaborator DexLvL, the album draws on Bennett's travels to Ghana and Jamaica and features guests including Vic Mensa, Joey Badass, Jamila Woods and BJ the Chicago Kid. It debuted at number 22 on the Billboard 200 with about 21,000 units, well below the number-two debut of The Big Day though critics widely described as a "remarkable return to form."

== Artistry ==
=== Musical style ===
Bennett has said in interviews with XXL and Complex that Kanye West, James Brown, MC Hammer, Prince, Lupe Fiasco, Common, Young Thug, Lil Wayne, Esham, Eminem, Souls of Mischief, and Freestyle Fellowship have influenced him. When asked about gospel influences in his music, he mentioned that Kirk Franklin is one of his favorite artists and his favorite composer.

Bennett's music has been described as versatile and uplifting. His music generally contains jazz-inspired melodies and gospel influences. His lyrics usually have references to Christian theology, his struggles with his faith, and his upbringing. He incorporates choirs into his music to attempt to maximize the gospel undertones. Shardé Chapman at HuffPost has described Bennett's lyrics as "creative" and "colorful".

He often performs traditional singing songs and has a light-lyric tenor voice with an expansive vocal range which spans three octaves. Bennett's vocal range reaches its extreme low at the bass F♯ (F♯2), and rises to its peak high at the tenor high F (F5).

=== Fashion ===
Bennett's fashion style is a large part of his public image and he has taken interest in the industry. He has designed hats for the Chicago White Sox. The Hollywood Reporter said that Bennett is "redefining fashion" with his style of generally wearing overalls and contesting traditional hip-hop fashion norms. He wore a suit which was meant to imitate Michael Jackson at the 2017 BET Awards. Bennett was seen wearing Thom Browne clothing at the 2017 Grammys. Bennett has been known to wear a signature hat with the number three on it. Regarding the meaning of the number three in his fashion, he said, "I've rationalized it to myself that it stands for the third mixtape, the Holy Trinity, and the three-pronged family of myself, my daughter, and my girl."

== Activism and politics ==
Bennett's father, Ken Bennett, has been involved in Democratic Party politics on the local and national level. Ken worked for Barack Obama as a presidential appointee and as an aide. Ken worked on Obama's presidential campaign in 2008, was an aide to Rahm Emanuel, the mayor of Chicago, and was the Chicago mayoral campaign co-chair for Toni Preckwinkle in 2019.

Despite his family's ties to the Democratic Party, Chance Bennett has called himself an independent voter, although he has a history of supporting Democrats. Bennett volunteered with Barack Obama's reelection campaign by phonebanking in Hyde Park, Chicago and has given speeches at the University of Chicago Institute of Politics.

In 2020, Bennett endorsed Kanye West for president in West's 2020 presidential campaign. Bennett took to Twitter to praise West, stating he trusted in him more than he trusted Joe Biden. His Tweets were criticized heavily, but Bennett reiterated that he did not take them back. In 2018, West had donated $73,540 to the campaign of Amara Eniya a week after Bennett had endorsed her.

=== Chicago politics ===
In November 2014, Mayor Rahm Emanuel named Bennett as Chicago's Outstanding Youth of the Year for his activism. Bennett's work to support Chicago youth includes hosting Open Mike nights for Chicago-area high school students in collaboration with Chicago Public Library, which drew the attendance of fellow Chicago natives and celebrities like Hannibal Buress and Kanye West. In December 2015, Bennett joined with Detroit-based nonprofit group Empowerment Plan to start an initiative called Warmest Winter 2016. The initiative raised money to give 1,000 specially manufactured coats, which doubled as sleeping bags and shoulder bags, and were manufactured by homeless citizens of Detroit, to homeless citizens of Chicago. In June 2016, he hosted the Teens in the Park event, a free youth festival on Chicago's Northerly Island that drew an attendance of 3,300.

Bennett co-created a new nonprofit called SocialWorks in September 2016, an extension of his Open Mike program which aimed to create youth programs for residents of Chicago, among other goals. Open Mike nights and the Warmest Winter initiative later became part of SocialWorks.

Bennett has actively fought to combat gun violence in his hometown of Chicago and in 2014, along with his father, promoted the "#SaveChicago" campaign. The campaign sought to stop gun violence over Memorial Day Weekend. During 2014's Memorial Day weekend, Chicago went 42 straight hours without a shooting. Bennett met with President Obama at the White House on April 16, 2016, to discuss My Brother's Keeper Challenge, an initiative of the United States Federal Government to promote intervention by civic leaders in the lives of young men of color to address their unique challenges and to promote racial justice, with other musicians, including Alicia Keys, Busta Rhymes, Janelle Monáe, J. Cole, and others. Bennett started a Twitter campaign for May 23, 2016, using #May23 to stop gun violence for 42 hours.

On March 6, 2017, after a meeting with Governor Bruce Rauner that did not go well only days before, Bennett announced his intention to donate $1,000,000 to Chicago Public Schools in order to help offset the lack of government funding provided. Following this, a movement arose to try and inspire Bennett to run for mayor of Chicago. This was backed by fellow media personalities including musician Drake.

In July 2018, Bennett purchased the Chicago journalism website Chicagoist from WNYC. The website had been inactive since it was abruptly shut down by former owner Joe Ricketts in November 2017, and Bennett planned to relaunch the website later in 2018. Chicagoist did not relaunch in 2018 and is currently inactive, with no update since 2022.

In the 2019 Chicago mayoral election, Bennett was an active supporter of Amara Enyia. Bennett initially endorsed Enyia at a press conference in October 2018. Bennett campaigned with Enyia and made major donations to her mayoral bid. Fellow rapper and Chicago native Kanye West also donated to Enyia's campaign. In the February 2019 election, Enyia finished fifth out of fourteen candidates, and did not advance to the mayoral runoff. Lori Lightfoot and Preckwinkle, who had hired Bennett's father as campaign co-chair, instead advanced to the runoff. In the runoff, Chance Bennett endorsed Preckwinkle, criticizing Lightfoot as having worked against the interests of Chicago's black community.

=== Opposition to Donald Trump ===
Bennett is an outspoken critic of President Donald Trump, having criticized him numerous times and drawn comparisons to former President Barack Obama. During the 2016 Presidential election, Bennett said he was not scared of a Trump presidency. When asked why by GQ, Bennett said "Like, 'Make America Great Again', that's not a real thing because shit ain't really switched up for [white middle class]". Bennett endorsed Democratic candidate Hillary Clinton on October 6, 2016, expressing concerns about the way she was treated in the media and also expressing that she could "fix Chicago" and led a "march" to numerous polling stations with thousands of Chicagoans. Following the victory of Donald Trump in the 2016 presidential election, Bennett said "Trump was going to win, anybody in the world who's surprised by the election of Donald Trump has been ignorant of racism, and the tides and patterns of American history and world history." In February 2017, Bennett posted publicly on Twitter that he was worried President Trump was going to change constitutional term limits. Bennett has compared Trump's fascination with Chicago to "going to war". In August 2017, Bennett claimed to have a "bigger voice than Donald Trump". Bennett also became an outspoken critic of Chicago Mayor Emanuel later in his term, though his father had worked for Emanuel and he himself had earlier accepted Emanuel's support.

Bennett has been an active Twitter user, with several of his tweets on social issues going viral. For example, Bennett garnered attention from Time magazine when he tweeted criticism of an article titled "In Wake of Weinstein, Men Wonder If Hugging Women Still OK". Following Kanye West's Tweets announcing his support of Donald Trump in April 2018, Bennett tweeted in support of West's freedom to choose to be Republican, sparking controversy among his fanbase. Trump later tweeted thanking Bennett for his support of West, though Bennett disavowed Trump's praise.

== Personal life ==
Bennett lives in Chicago, his hometown. He once shared a house in North Hollywood with James Blake, a British singer. Bennett said that the time he lived in North Hollywood was "ungodly". After graduating from high school, Bennett attended a community college for a week before dropping out. Bennett has taken numerous recreational drugs during his lifetime, including LSD and Xanax, but has since stepped away from them.

=== Family ===
His younger brother, Taylor Bennett, is also a rapper. Both brothers began rapping at the same time and have a similar style. Both of them draw inspiration from fellow Chicago native Kanye West.

In July 2015, Chance Bennett announced that he was expecting his first child with his girlfriend Kirsten Corley, whom he began dating in 2013. In September 2015, Corley gave birth to their daughter. By May 2016, Bennett and Corley had broken up with Corley petitioning that Bennett be legally declared the father of their daughter, requiring him to pay child support.

In February 2017, Bennett's child support case reopened in an attempt to work out child support terms and a parenting schedule as Bennett and Corley moved to separate residences. The Chicago Sun-Times published an article about a dispute between the two in March 2017. Bennett replied to the article saying "Y'all better do y'all jobs and stop worrying about how good my family is. Just a friendly reminder. Don't let anybody get between you and your family." On March 21, 2017, the dispute was settled out of court. Corley and Bennett reconciled and on July 4, 2018, they got engaged after five years together. They married on March 9, 2019, at the Pelican Hill Resort in Newport Beach, California; guests included Kim Kardashian and Kanye West. In September 2019, Corley and Bennett announced that they had welcomed their second daughter. In April 2024, the couple announced that they had separated after five years of marriage. In December 2024, Corley filed for divorce; it was finalized in early 2025. In November 2026, Bennett announced the birth of his third child, a daughter named Hayli, via Instagram.

=== Christianity ===
Bennett is Christian and refers to Jesus in many of his songs. Bennett grew up as a Christian inspired by his grandmother but later fell out of the faith. He rediscovered his faith when his daughter was born with atrial flutter. Speaking about the situation Bennett said "[I just] pray a whole lot, you know, and need a lot of angels and just see shit in a very, like, direct way…You know, God bless everything, it worked out well." Bennett wrote on Twitter after the situation on January 31, 2016, "Today's the last day my old life, last day smoking cigs. Headed to church for help. All things are possible through Christ who strengthens me."

Since the release of his mixtape Coloring Book, Bennett identifies as being a Christian rapper. He believes that God is responsible for his blessings and his success. He has attended many dates for Kanye West's Sunday Service (Sunday Service Choir), most notably performing his verse on "Ultralight Beam" at Coachella 2019 and in his hometown at Chicago's Huntington Bank Pavilion.

== Discography ==
Studio albums

- The Big Day (2019)
- Star Line (2025)

Mixtapes

- 10 Day (2012)
- Acid Rap (2013)
- Coloring Book (2016)

== Filmography ==
Film
Year	Film	Role	Notes
2018	Slice	Dax Lycander	Credited as Chance Bennett
2019	The Lion King	Bushbaby (voice)	
2019	Between Two Ferns: The Movie	Himself	
2021	Chance The Rapper's Magnificent Coloring World	Himself	Concert film directed by Jake Schreier

Television
Year	Show	Role	Notes
2013	The Eric Andre Show	Himself	
2013	The Arsenio Hall Show	Himself	
2014	Black Dynamite	Bob Marley	Voice role
2015	The Late Show with Stephen Colbert	Himself	
2015	Saturday Night Live	Himself	Musical guest
2016	The Tonight Show Starring Jimmy Fallon	Himself	
2016	The Ellen DeGeneres Show	Himself	
2017	Wild 'N Out	Himself	
2017	Saturday Night Live	Himself	Guest host
2019	Saturday Night Live	Himself	Guest host and musical guest
2019	The Late Late Show with James Corden	Himself	Guest host and musical Guest
2019	Rhythm + Flow	Himself	Judge
2020	Punk'd	Himself	Host
2020	Nickelodeon's Unfiltered	Himself	Episode: "Robots Love Cereal!"
2021	South Side	Herbert	Episodes: "Sarcophacouch", "The Laughter"
2021	Tyler Perry's Young Dylan	Himself	Episode: "Rap Dreams Do Come True"
2022	That's My Jam	Himself/Guest	Along with Joseph Gordon-Levitt, Josh Groban, Alessia Cara
2023	The Proud Family: Louder and Prouder	Darrius	Guest star in season 2
2023	The Voice	Himself/Coach	Season 23
2023	The Voice	Himself/Advisor	Season 24
2024	The Voice	Himself/Coach	Season 25

Short films
	Film	Role	Notes
2013	Clapping for the Wrong Reasons	Marcus	
2015	Mr. Happy	Victor	
2019	Steven Universe: The Movie	Songwriter, Co-executive producer	TV movie

== Concert tours ==
- Magnificent Coloring World Tour (2016)
- Be Encouraged Tour (2017)
- The Big Tour (2019)
- And We Back Tour (2025)
- 10 Years of Coloring Book (2026)

== Awards and nominations ==
Award	Year (Note: Indicates the year of ceremony. Each year is linked to the article about the awards held that year, wherever possible.)	Recipient(s) and nominee(s)	Category	Result	Ref.
American Music Awards	2017	"I'm the One" (with DJ Khaled, Justin Bieber, Quavo and Lil Wayne)	Collaboration of the Year	Nominated	
American Music Awards	2017	"I'm the One" (with DJ Khaled, Justin Bieber, Quavo and Lil Wayne)	Favorite Song — Rap/Hip Hop	Nominated	
BET Awards	2017	Himself	Best New Artist	Won	
BET Awards	2017	Himself	Best Male Hip-Hop Artist	Nominated	
BET Awards	2017	Himself	Humanitarian Award	Won	
BET Awards	2017	"No Problem" (featuring Lil Wayne and 2 Chainz)	Best Collaboration	Won	
BET Awards	2017	Coloring Book	Album of the Year	Nominated	
BET Hip Hop Awards	2016	Himself	Lyricist of the Year	Nominated	
BET Hip Hop Awards	2016	Himself	Best New Hip Hop Artist	Won	
BET Hip Hop Awards	2016	Coloring Book	Best Mixtape	Won	
BET Hip Hop Awards	2017	Himself	Hot Ticket Performer	Nominated	
BET Hip Hop Awards	2017	Himself	Lyricist of the Year	Nominated	
BET Hip Hop Awards	2017	Himself	MVP of the Year	Nominated	
BET Hip Hop Awards	2017	Himself	Hustler of the Year	Nominated	
BET Hip Hop Awards	2017	"I'm the One" (with DJ Khaled, Justin Bieber, Quavo and Lil Wayne)	Sweet 16: Best Featured Verse	Nominated	
Billboard Live Music Awards	2016	Himself	Concert and Marketing Promotions	Won	
Billboard Music Awards	2018	"I'm the One" (with DJ Khaled, Justin Bieber, Quavo and Lil Wayne)	Top Rap Song	Nominated	
Billboard Music Awards	2019	"No Brainer" (with DJ Khaled, Justin Bieber and Quavo)	Top R&B Song	Nominated	
BMI R&B/Hip-Hop Awards	2017	"No Problem"	Winning Songs	Won	
BMI R&B/Hip-Hop Awards	2017	"Father Stretch My Hands, Pt. 1"	Winning Songs	Won	
BMI R&B/Hip-Hop Awards	2018	"I'm the One"	Winning Song	Won	
GAFFA Awards (Denmark)	2016	Himself	Best Foreign Male Act	Nominated	
GAFFA Awards (Denmark)	2016	Coloring Book	Best Foreign Album	Nominated	
GAFFA Awards (Norway)	2016	Himself	Best Foreign Solo Artist	Nominated	
GAFFA Awards (Norway)	2016	Coloring Book	Best Foreign Album	Nominated	
GAFFA Awards (Sweden)	2016	Himself	Best Foreign Solo Artist	Nominated	
GAFFA Awards (Sweden)	2016	Coloring Book	Best Foreign Album	Nominated	
Grammy Awards	2017	Coloring Book	Best Rap Album	Won	
Grammy Awards	2017	Himself	Best New Artist	Won	
Grammy Awards	2017	"No Problem" (featuring Lil Wayne and 2 Chainz)	Best Rap Performance	Won	
Grammy Awards	2017	"No Problem" (featuring Lil Wayne and 2 Chainz)	Best Rap Song	Nominated	
Grammy Awards	2017	"Famous" (as songwriter)	Best Rap Song	Nominated	
Grammy Awards	2017	"Ultralight Beam" (with Kanye West, Kirk Franklin, The-Dream and Kelly Price)	Best Rap Song	Nominated	
Grammy Awards	2017	"Ultralight Beam" (with Kanye West, Kirk Franklin, The-Dream and Kelly Price)	Best Rap/Sung Performance	Nominated	
HipHopDX Awards	2019	Rhythm & Flow (as a judge and executive producer)	Best TV Show of the Year	Won	
iHeartRadio Much Music Video Awards	2017	Himself	Best New International Artist	Nominated	
iHeartRadio Music Awards	2017	Himself	Best New Artist	Nominated	
iHeartRadio Music Awards	2017	Himself	Best New Hip-Hop Artist	Won	
iHeartRadio Music Awards	2018	Himself	iHeartRadio Innovator Award	Won	
iHeartRadio Music Awards	2018	"I'm the One" (with DJ Khaled, Justin Bieber, Quavo and Lil Wayne)	Best Music Video	Nominated	
iHeartRadio Music Awards	2018	"May I Have This Dance" (with Francis & The Lights)	Best Remix	Nominated	
MOBO Awards	2016	Himself	Best International Act	Nominated	
MTV Video Music Awards	2016	"Angels" (featuring Saba)	Best Hip Hop	Nominated	
MTV Video Music Awards	2017	"Same Drugs"	Best Hip Hop	Nominated	
MTV Video Music Awards	2017	"I'm the One" (with DJ Khaled, Justin Bieber, Quavo and Lil Wayne)	Best Hip Hop	Nominated	
MTV Video Music Awards	2018	"No Brainer" (with DJ Khaled, Justin Bieber and Quavo)	Song of Summer	Nominated	
MTV Video Music Awards Japan	2016	"Angels" (featuring Saba)	Best Hip Hop Video	Nominated	
MTV Woodies	2017	Himself	Woodie of the Year	Nominated	
MTV Woodies	2017	"Ultralight Beam"	Cover Woodie	Nominated	
NAACP Image Awards	2017	Himself	Outstanding New Artist	Won	
NAACP Image Awards	2017	Himself	Outstanding Male Artist	Nominated	
NAACP Image Awards	2017	Coloring Book	Outstanding Album	Nominated	
Nickelodeon Kids' Choice Awards	2018	"I'm the One" (with DJ Khaled, Justin Bieber, Quavo and Lil Wayne)	Favorite Song	Nominated	
Nickelodeon Kids' Choice Awards	2019	"No Brainer" (with DJ Khaled, Justin Bieber and Quavo)	Favorite Collaboration	Won	
Primetime Emmy Award	2017	"Last Christmas" shared with: Eli Brueggemann (music); Chance the Rapper, Will Stephen & Kenan Thompson (lyrics)	Outstanding Original Music and Lyrics	Nominated	
Soul Train Music Awards	2016	Himself	Best New Artist	Won	
Soul Train Music Awards	2016	"No Problem" (featuring Lil Wayne and 2 Chainz)	Rhythm & Bars Award	Nominated	
Soul Train Music Awards	2016	"No Problem" (featuring Lil Wayne and 2 Chainz)	Best Collaboration	Nominated	
Soul Train Music Awards	2017	Himself	Best Gospel/Inspirational Award	Nominated	
Soul Train Music Awards	2018	"I'm the One" (with DJ Khaled, Justin Bieber, Quavo and Lil Wayne)	Rhythm & Bars Award	Nominated	
Teen Choice Awards	2017	Himself	Choice Breakout Artist	Won	
Teen Choice Awards	2017	Himself	Choice Artist: R&B/Hip-Hop	Nominated	
Teen Choice Awards	2017	"I'm the One" (with DJ Khaled, Justin Bieber, Quavo and Lil Wayne)	Choice Song: R&B/Hip-Hop	Won	
UK Music Video Awards	2019	"Cross Me" (with Ed Sheeran and PnB Rock)	Best Pop Video – UK	Nominated	
Libera Awards	2020	The Big Day	Best R&B/Hip-Hop Album	Nominated	
