= Ponyride =

Coworker-space-providing nonprofit organization

- Company type: Private
- Industry: nonprofit
- Founded: 1935
- Founders: Phil Cooley & Kate Bordine
- Headquarters: Corktown, Detroit, Detroit, USA

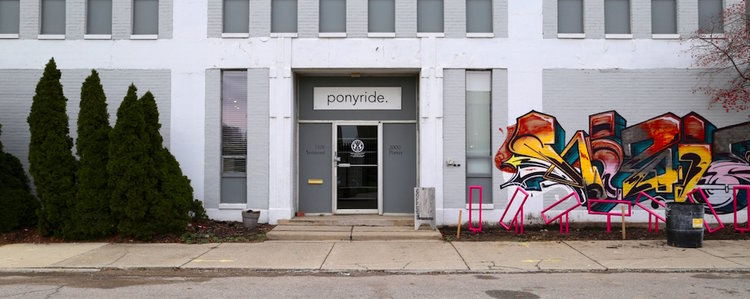
Entrance to Ponyride in Detroit, Michigan

Ponyride is a nonprofit located in Detroit, Michigan. Since 2011, the organization has occupied a 33,000 square foot building located at 1401 Vermont Street in the Corktown neighborhood. Founded by Phil Cooley and Kate Bordine, Ponyride provides workspace, educational and material resources, and networking tools to artists, entrepreneurs, craftspeople, and other nonprofits.

== Description ==
The building Ponyride occupies was originally built in 1935 as a printing facility for the automotive industry, designed by Smith, Hinchman and Grylls. Ponyride currently rents space to over 60 residents on a month-to-month lease term. The facility also includes a dance studio, coffee shop, and event space. Most of the tenants produce work centered on a community focus, enhancing social welfare in Detroit to some capacity. For example, Ponyride served as an incubator for the Empowerment Plan which manufactures specialized coats that double as sleeping bags for the homeless population.

In 2017, Ponyride became the first Detroit coworking space to offer on-site child care. The foundation received more national buzz when MythBusters' Adam Savage toured the facility for his video series Tested.com. The New York Times also featured Ponyride and spoke to founder Phil Cooley in their feature, "Detroit, the Most Exciting City in America?" Additionally in 2017, the Ponyride Market Summer Series became a monthly event, giving resident makers of the building a direct means of vending to the community.
