= The Big Tour (Chance the Rapper) =

2019 concert tour by Chance the Rapper

- Tour by Chance the Rapper
- Associated album: The Big Day
- Start date: September 20, 2019
- End date: December 14, 2019
- Legs: 1
- No. of shows: 5

Chance the Rapper concert chronology
- Be Encouraged Tour (2017); The Big Tour (2019-2020)

The Big Tour (stylized THE BIG TOUR!) was the third concert tour by American recording artist, Chance the Rapper, in support of his debut album, The Big Day (2019). The tour began on September 20, 2019 in Las Vegas. The tour was cancelled in December 2019 after just five shows.

== Background ==
On July 29, 2019, the rapper originally announced a 35-date tour starting in North America to promote his first album, The Big Day. However, on September 9, 2019, the rapper announced most tour dates would be postponed to spend more time with his family. Tickets bought for the original dates will be honored for the rescheduled dates. Festival appearances in Las Vegas & Miami Beach, and the first tour date in Chicago remained as scheduled. On September 25, 2019, Lil Yachty and Taylor Bennett were announced as the opening acts. The entire tour was cancelled on December 15, 2019.

== Tour dates ==
List of concerts, showing date, city, country, venue, opening acts, tickets sold, number of available tickets and amount of gross revenue
Date	City	Country	Venue	Opening acts	Attendance	Revenue
Leg 1 - North America
September 20, 2019 (Note: The concert on September 20, 2019 at Downtown Las Vegas was part of Life Is Beautiful Music & Art Festival.)	Las Vegas	United States	Downtown Las Vegas	—N/a	—N/a	—N/a
September 21, 2019 (Note: The concert on September 21, 2019 at T-Mobile Arena was part of iHeartRadio Music Festival.)	Las Vegas	United States	T-Mobile Arena	—N/a	—N/a	—N/a
September 28, 2019	Chicago	United States	United Center	Lil Yachty; Taylor Bennett	13,760 / 13,760	$1,248,302
November 10, 2019 (Note: The concert on November 10, 2019 at South Beach is part of Miami Beach Pop Festival.)	Miami Beach	United States	South Beach	—N/a	—N/a	—N/a
December 14, 2019 (Note: The concert on December 14, 2019 at Banc of California Stadium is part of Rolling Loud Festival.)	Los Angeles	United States	Banc of California Stadium	—N/a	—N/a	—N/a

=== Cancelled shows ===
List of cancelled concerts, showing date, city, country, venue, and reason for cancellation
Date	City	Country	Venue	Reason
October 14, 2019	Tampa	United States	Amalie Arena	Originally postponed for paternity leave in 2019; Cancelled due to venue unavailability in 2020
October 29, 2019	Saint Paul	United States	Xcel Energy Center	Originally postponed for paternity leave in 2019; Cancelled due to venue unavailability in 2020
January 15, 2020	San Diego	United States	Pechanga Arena	Taking time to be with family and develop new music
January 16, 2020	Inglewood	United States	The Forum	Radius clause due to performing at Rolling Loud Festival
January 17, 2020	San Francisco	United States	Chase Center	Taking time to be with family and develop new music
January 19, 2020	Glendale	United States	Gila River Arena	Taking time to be with family and develop new music
January 21, 2020	Denver	United States	Pepsi Center	Taking time to be with family and develop new music
January 23, 2020	Austin	United States	Frank Erwin Center	Taking time to be with family and develop new music
January 25, 2020	Dallas	United States	American Airlines Center	Taking time to be with family and develop new music
January 26, 2020	Houston	United States	Toyota Center	Taking time to be with family and develop new music
January 28, 2020	Nashville	United States	Bridgestone Arena	Taking time to be with family and develop new music
January 29, 2020	Atlanta	United States	State Farm Arena	Taking time to be with family and develop new music
January 30, 2020	Charlotte	United States	Spectrum Center	Taking time to be with family and develop new music
February 1, 2020	Louisville	United States	KFC Yum! Center	Taking time to be with family and develop new music
February 4, 2020	Cleveland	United States	Rocket Mortgage FieldHouse	Taking time to be with family and develop new music
February 6, 2020	Detroit	United States	Little Caesars Arena	Taking time to be with family and develop new music
February 8, 2020	New York City	United States	Madison Square Garden	Taking time to be with family and develop new music
February 10, 2020	Buffalo	United States	KeyBank Center	Taking time to be with family and develop new music
February 12, 2020	Toronto	Canada	Scotiabank Arena	Taking time to be with family and develop new music
February 13, 2020	Montreal	Canada	Bell Centre	Taking time to be with family and develop new music
February 14, 2020	Boston	United States	TD Garden	Taking time to be with family and develop new music
February 18, 2020	Washington, D.C.	United States	Capital One Arena	Taking time to be with family and develop new music
February 19, 2020	Philadelphia	United States	Wells Fargo Center	Taking time to be with family and develop new music
February 20, 2020	Pittsburgh	United States	PPG Paints Arena	Taking time to be with family and develop new music
February 22, 2020	Kansas City	United States	Sprint Center	Taking time to be with family and develop new music
February 24, 2020	Milwaukee	United States	Fiserv Forum	Taking time to be with family and develop new music
Date never finalized	Chicago	United States	United Center	Taking time to be with family and develop new music
Date never finalized	Newark	United States	Prudential Center	Taking time to be with family and develop new music
Date never finalized	St. Louis	United States	Enterprise Center	Taking time to be with family and develop new music
Date never finalized	Tulsa	United States	BOK Center	Taking time to be with family and develop new music
Date never finalized	Omaha	United States	CHI Health Center Omaha	Taking time to be with family and develop new music
Date never finalized	Ottawa	Canada	Canadian Tire Centre	Taking time to be with family and develop new music
