= Veronika Scott =

American social entrepreneur

Veronika Scott is an American social entrepreneur and CEO and founder of The Empowerment Plan, a Detroit-based humanitarian organization.

== Personal life and education ==
Scott was born on June 27, 1989, in Orange, California, but was raised in Huntington Woods, Michigan, a town just outside of Detroit. She has 2 younger siblings. She attended Clarkston High School and continued her academic studies at the College for Creative Studies (CCS) in Detroit, where she studied industrial design. Scott lived with her grandparents while she was at school. She graduated from CCS in December 2011 with a degree in Product Design.

== Career ==
During college, Veronika worked as a design intern for The Little Tikes Company (2009-2010) and for ECCO design (2010). In the fall of 2010, in response to a class assignment sponsored by Project H to design something to fill a social need, Scott reached out to the homeless community in Detroit. After five months of working closely with the individuals at a local homeless shelter, she had designed a heat-trapping jacket that can transform into a warm and weather-resistant sleeping bag. At the end of the semester, Scott continued to work with the homeless population to create other prototypes and to improve the quality and design of the jacket. At one point during her visits at the shelter, Veronika was approached by a woman who stated that "We don't need coats. We need jobs." Scott went on to hire and train homeless mothers to make the coats.

Scott's idea for her class project quickly evolved into a non-profit organization known as Empowerment Plan. The mission according to their website is:

Our goal is to help build a better life for those that have become trapped in the cycle of homelessness. We mostly hire homeless parents from local shelters to become full time seamstresses so that they can earn a stable income, find secure housing, and gain back their independence for themselves and for their families.

== Awards and recognition ==
- In 2011, Scott was recognized by the Industrial Design Society of America and was awarded the IDSA: IDEA Gold Award

- In 2012, Scott became the youngest person ever to receive the JFK New Frontier Award from the John F. Kennedy Library Foundation

- In 2013, Scott was named one of Crain’s Detroit Business “Twenty in their 20s”

- In 2015, Scott was named a CNN Hero
