= Ultralight Beam =

2016 song by Kanye West

Song by Kanye West

from the album The Life of Pablo
- Released: February 14, 2016
- Recorded: 2015–2016
- Genre: Hip hop; gospel
- Length: 5:21
- Label: GOOD Music; Def Jam
- Songwriters: Kanye West; Mike Dean; Kelly Price; Terius Nash; Nico Segal; Kirk Franklin; Kasseem Dean; Chancelor Bennett; Noah Goldstein; Jerome Potter; Samuel Griesemer; Cydel Young; Derek Watkins
- Producers: Kanye West; Mike Dean; Chance the Rapper; Swizz Beatz

"Ultralight Beam" is a song by American recording artist Kanye West from his seventh studio album The Life of Pablo (2016). The song features vocals by R&B singers The-Dream and Kelly Price, rapper Chance the Rapper, gospel singer Kirk Franklin and a ten-piece choir, with additional vocals by Natalie Green and Samoria Green. It was first performed live on Saturday Night Live in February 2016.

The song, heavily influenced by soul and gospel music, is about West's faith in God. As described by producer Derek Watkins, Its recording process took place over multiple jam sessions, where some of West's regular collaborators, including Mike Dean, were involved. Other participants included Watkins, producer Swizz Beatz and singer Justin Bieber, whose contributions were omitted from the final recording. In an interview, Watkins describes the "ultralight beam" as "the connection that goes straight to heaven." The song's opening is taken from a video uploaded to the social media site Instagram of a four-year-old girl named Natalie Green talking about God.

Since being released, "Ultralight Beam" has received universal acclaim from music critics, who complimented its message and performances. Chance the Rapper was singled out with praise for his performance. It charted in the United States, the United Kingdom, New Zealand, Ireland, and Canada in 2016. The song was nominated for the Grammy Award for Best Rap/Sung Performance and Best Rap Song at the 59th Annual Grammy Awards in 2017. The song appeared on year-end lists for 2016 by multiple publications, including Complex and Consequence of Sound. In 2019, Pitchfork and Rolling Stone both listed it among the best songs of the 2010s.

The song has since been performed by both West and Chance the Rapper in concert. It has left a significant legacy despite never being released as a single. The song has been covered by other artists including Harry Styles, Stormzy, Austin Gleason and Local Natives. A reinterpretation of the song, produced by West, was released by the Sunday Service Choir in 2019.

== Background and recording ==
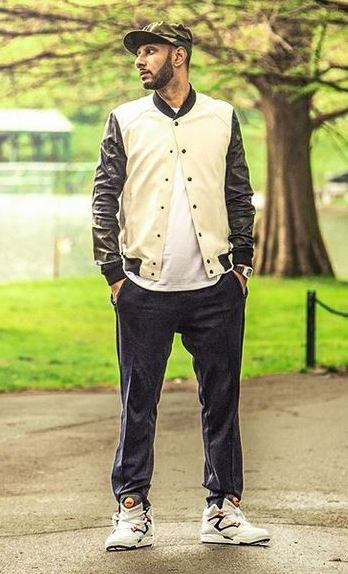
Producer Swizz Beatz programmed the song's drums.

According to writer and producer Derek Watkins, better known as Fonzworth Bentley, the song originated after he arrived at an L.A. studio and heard Mike Dean playing the song's chords. The drums were programmed by Swizz Beatz several days later. Watkins and Plain Pat retrieved some tambourines and held an impromptu jam session with Kanye West and Chance the Rapper. The tambourines from this session are on the song's final mix. The group was joined by Justin Bieber and his collaborator Poo Bear. A freestyle was initiated by West. The song's melody and the lyrics "this is an ultralight beam" were sung by West and Chance the Rapper during this freestyle. According to Watkins, many of West's patterns and words during the freestyle ended up in his final verse. The two were joined by Bieber, who sang a cappella. Bieber's participation was first revealed by Chance the Rapper, and later confirmed by Fonzworth Bentley in an interview with The Fader. However, he does not appear on the final version of the song.

Watkins began editing the freestyle at West's request. As he was editing, he "heard" Kelly Price and Kirk Franklin in a choir and knew they had to be on the track. Watkins told West and contacted Price and Franklin. He told Price about the concept of the "ultralight beam." Price said Watkins sent her the track and told her to "write what you feel." She felt the connection between the contributors was "spiritual." Watkins called Franklin and had him fly to L.A. to record his verse. When he was in the studio with the choir, Franklin taught every member their parts in seven minutes. After the choir had performed, Franklin and Price recorded their parts. Chance the Rapper knew the lyrics to his verse. He put headphones on and penned it out. According to Watkins, the song was not officially complete until The Life of Pablo's release. The song, like its parent album, was viewed as "a working document." He stated, "you don't hear the final version of it until it is available for purchase."

In an interview, producers Samo Sound Boy and DJ Dodger Stadium (DJDS) said they both contributed to songs on The Life of Pablo, including "Ultralight Beam", a month before the album's release. On the final release, Same Sound Boy is credited as a writer and DJ Dodger Stadium is credited as both a writer and producer.

== Composition and lyrics ==
"Ultralight Beam"
A 22-second sample of West's vocals on "Ultralight Beam".

"Ultralight Beam" is a hip hop song with elements of soul and gospel music. The song has one official sample credit, a video uploaded to the social media site Instagram by user @sheisnatalie of a four-year-old girl named Natalie Green talking about God. In the video, she says, "We don't want no devils in the house, God!", followed by: "We want the Lord, and that's it!" The clip is used as the song's intro. The girl's adoptive parents sued West on February 8, 2019, claiming in court documents that although the sample was cleared by her biological mother, she was not authorized to give permission for its use.

After the Instagram sample, West sings his verse, with assistance from The-Dream. Kelly Price provides the third verse and Chance the Rapper raps the fourth verse. The song ends with West, the choir, and gospel singer Kirk Franklin. In his verse West talks about his relationship with and his faith in God. In her verse, Price asks her own questions about God, but ultimately knows when her faith is tested she can look towards "the light" and everything will be alright. In his verse, the longest on the song, Chance the Rapper speaks about his relationship with God, his daughter, and his life growing up in Chicago. He also comments on Spike Lee's film Chi-Raq (2015), whose premise he has openly spoken out against. Explaining the lyrics: "You can feel the lyrics, the spirit coming in braille/Tubman of the underground, come and follow the trail," Chance the Rapper wrote: "The Tubman line refers to my own leadership of all other artists towards independence and freedom."

Watkins, Price, and Chance the Rapper have spoken out about the song's meaning. In an interview with The Fader, Derek Watkins describes the "ultralight beam" as "the connection that goes straight to heaven." Watkins continued, "This is the thing that people say is intangible, that people try to wrap their heads around. A lot of different people articulate it in different ways, but it just made sense in the way that Kanye said it." Chance the Rapper has said that "'Ultralight Beam' is about West's faith in God. Whenever he's down or feels he can't fight anymore, he searches for the light and knows, in God's hands, everything will be alright." Price has praised the track, calling it "a street parable." Price continued, "I can listen to it and hear messages of hurt, shame, anger, and fear, and then I can turn around and see hope, faith, redemption, compassion, rejuvenation, forgiveness, and getting up from a fall."

== Release and promotion ==
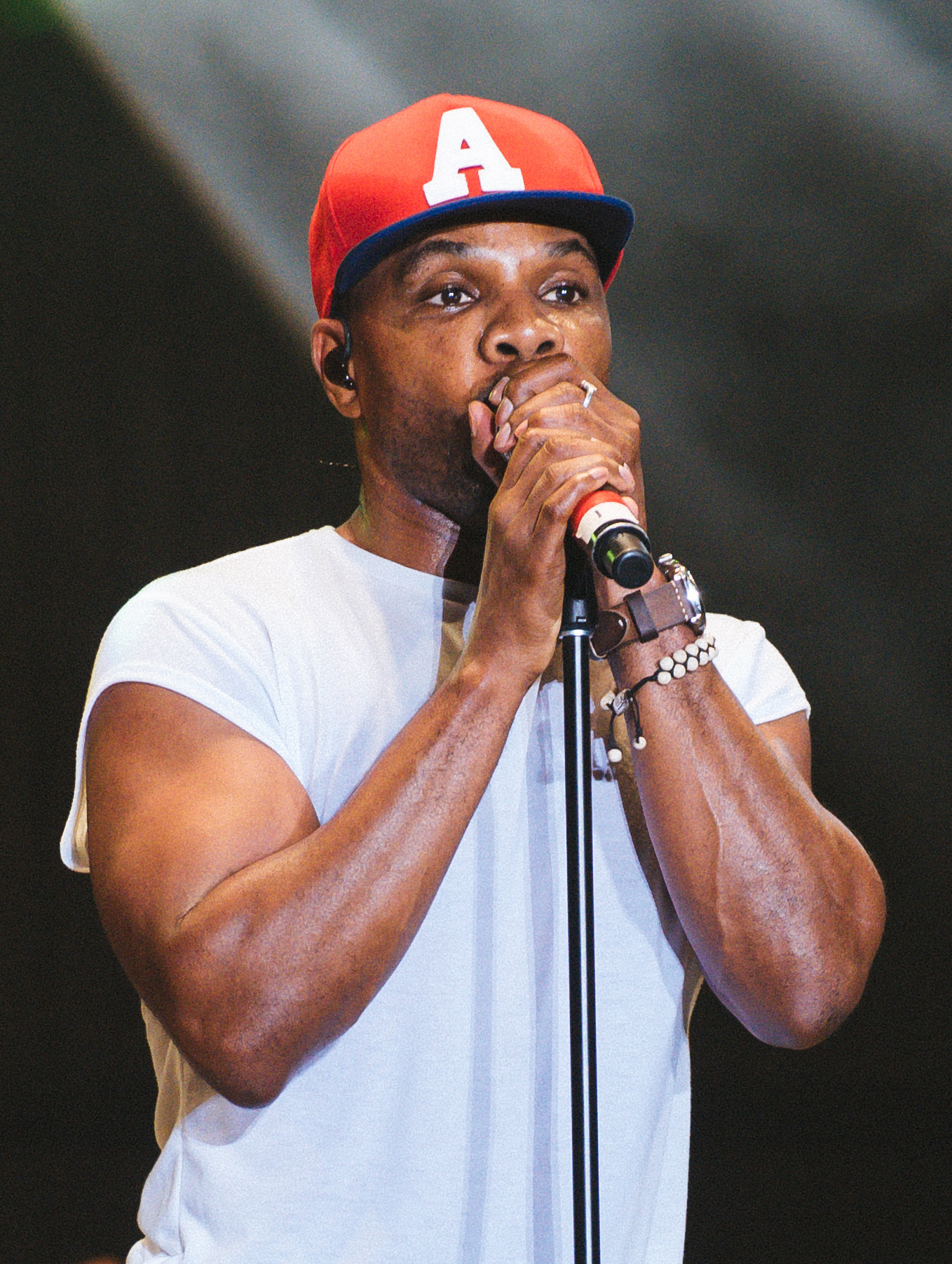
Kirk Franklin was one of the performers who debuted "Ultralight Beam" with West for Saturday Night Live and on Easter 2016, West shared an alternate version by the singer.

"Ultralight Beam" was released on February 14, 2016, as the first track on West's seventh studio album The Life of Pablo. The day before, West performed the song on Saturday Night Live with Chance the Rapper, Kirk Franklin, The-Dream, Kelly Price and a gospel choir. The performance received positive reviews from critics, with many commenting on Chance the Rapper's verse. Matt Wilstein of The Daily Beast said that he "ended up stealing the show with his fire verse." Jon Caramanica of The New York Times described the performance as "stirring" and "of uncommon intensity and vision." Price, in particular, has praised the performance because of her "spiritual connection" to the song. Two days before the album's release, a handwritten track list had been tweeted by West. It showed the song was called "Ultra Light Beams" rather than "Ultralight Beam" as it was titled on the official release. Chance the Rapper revealed the song was originally slated to be the closing track to The Life of Pablo rather than the album's opener.

On Easter 2016, West shared the SoundCloud link to an alternative version of the song, titled "Ultralight Prayer", via Twitter and wished everyone a happy Easter in his tweet. Chance the Rapper is not present on the two-minute long alternate gospel version, as sung by Franklin. When West traveled to Iceland with The Kardashians in April 2016, it had been rumored he was either filming a music video for "Ultralight Beam" or another album track, "Highlights". His wife Kim Kardashian and her sister Khloé Kardashian confirmed West filmed a video for "Highlights". Kim released Ultra Light Beam Highlighters for KKW Beauty in November 2017, as an "unexpected tribute" to her husband's song of the same name. This marked the first time West was part of KKW Beauty. It was not the first connection between his music and Kim's brand. She featured prominently on some of the merchandise for West's Saint Pablo Tour. The name choice was praised by fans across Twitter.

== Critical reception ==
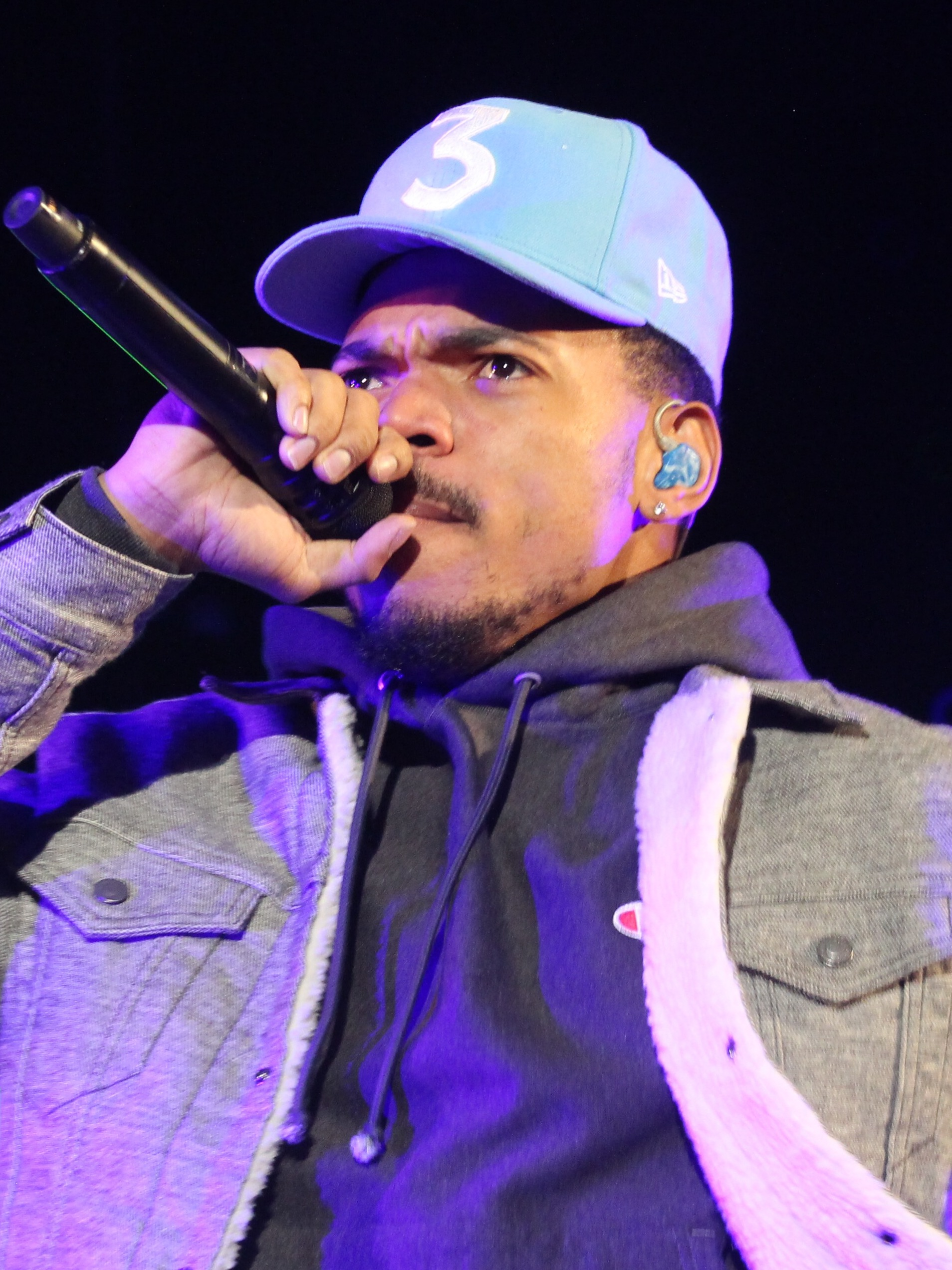
Chance the Rapper has received widespread acclaim for his performance on the song, with his verse described by one critic as a "clear highlight."

The song has received universal acclaim from music critics. David Jeffries of AllMusic called the song a "masterpiece." Jeffries felt "[it] represents the angelic side, offering a complicated emotional ride with the Gospel of Kirk Franklin fueling the song's jaw-dropping climax." Slate's Forrest Wickman described the track as signaling listeners that "[The Life of Pablo] will be the anti-Yeezus." Ray Rahman from Entertainment Weekly praised the performances and viewed the song as a "powerful" and "electric opening track." Writing for The Guardian, Alexis Petridis looked at the song as not feeling "episodic so much as fractured."

Many critics have commented upon Chance the Rapper's verse and performance on the track. Wickman called him "a clear highlight". Brian Josephs of Spin wrote that, "Chance's performance on "Ultralight Beam" was arguably his strongest" performance of 2016, on top of his own critically acclaimed mixtape Coloring Book. Complex called Chance the Rapper's verse one of the best rap verses of 2016 describing it as "dexterous and forceful" noting it is "more than a star turn, it's the kind of performance legacies are built on." Ryan Dombal of Pitchfork also praised Chance's the Rapper verse, writing, "In one virtuosic verse, Chance raps his redemption, how he was saved by God, by Kanye, by his baby daughter. He's giddy, young. 'Ugh, I'm just having fun with it,' he glows as a swell of brass joins his exaltation. Then those same horns dissipate, leaving Kanye alone with his cavernous choir once again." Okayplayer listed Chance the Rapper's verse among the 25 best rap verses of the 2010s, with the verse being ranked at number 16. Entertainment Weekly ranked the verse at number six on their list of the top ten rap verses of the decade.

== Accolades ==
The song has appeared on year-end lists of multiple publications. Pitchfork listed "Ultralight Beam" as the best song of 2016 on their ranking of the year's 100 best songs, writing: "[The song] is an exalted space, a promise of redemption and healing that felt more fragile and unlikely as the year wore on. It is a song of Godlike perspective from a man who spent most of the year appearing to have none." Similarly, Rolling Stone listed it as the fifth best song of 2016 on their list of the year's 50 best songs, writing "[the song's collaborators] help [West] plant a foot on the devil's neck." Conversely, Complex ranked the song 31 on their list of the year's 50 best songs, describing it as "audio weed, Xanax on wax, and a Bible verse rolled into one."

In 2019, Pitchfork listed "Ultralight Beam" among the 200 best songs of the 2010s decade, ranking it number 77. Mike Gowler of the publication praised West's use of guest appearances, the song's "uplifting" message, as well as the music itself. On Rolling Stone's list of the 100 best songs of the 2010s, the song was ranked at number 70, with Charles Holmes of the publication calling it "where West soars as a possessed choir director bringing out the best of his collaborators in service of a nearly six-minute opus." Other best songs of the decade list placements include; Insider ranking it the 27th best song of the 2010s, Uproxx naming it the 21st best song of the 2010s, and Stereogum placing it at 45th on its best songs of the 2010s list.

The song received Grammy nominations for Best Rap/Sung Performance and Best Rap Song at the 59th Annual Grammy Awards in 2017, losing both to "Hotline Bling" by Canadian rapper and singer Drake. However, the lack of a nomination for Song of the Year at the ceremony was called a snub by several publications. Kyle Hodge of VH1 viewed "Ultralight Beam" as the most deserving track from The Life of Pablo to earn a nomination for the award and described Chance the Rapper's verse on it as one of the album's "incredible musical and pop culture moments that can't be overlooked." In an interview with The Associated Press, The-Dream spoke of the song being snubbed, saying: "Usually in those Grammy categories, the song with more feeling actually wins. ... When I listen to this record, whether I'm in it or not, I would still feel something listening to it."

=== Listicles ===
Year-end lists
Publication	Accolade	Rank	Ref.
Billboard	The 100 Best Pop Songs of 2016	5	
Consequence of Sound	The 50 Songs of 2016	2	
Entertainment Weekly	The 100 Best Songs of 2016	4	
The Fader	The 115 Best Songs of 2016	3	
Highsnobiety	The 25 Best Songs of 2016	10	
HipHopDX	The 50 Best Songs of 2016	1	
HotNewHipHop	The Hottest 50 Songs of 2016	2	
The New York Times (Nate Chinen's List)	56 of the Best Songs of 2016	10	
NME	The Songs of the Year 2016	7	
NPR	Top 100 Songs of 2016	3	
Paste	The 50 Best Songs of 2016	10	
Pitchfork	The 100 Best Songs of 2016	1	
Pitchfork	Pitchfork Readers' Poll: Top 50 Songs of 2016	1	
Rolling Stone	The 50 Best Songs of 2016	5	
Spin	The 101 Best Songs of 2016	7	
The Village Voice	The Pazz & Jop Music Critics Poll 2016	2	
Yahoo!	The Best Songs of 2016	6	

== Live performances ==
West performed "Ultralight Beam" with Chance the Rapper, Kirk Franklin, The-Dream, Kelly Price and a gospel choir live on Saturday Night Live along with The Life of Pablo track "Highlights" the day before the album's release. Immediately after the performance, West made the announcement that The Life of Pablo had been released telling viewers: "Kanye West dot com right now, Tidal streaming right now." "Ultralight Beam" was on the setlist West shared for the kickoff show on his Saint Pablo Tour in Indianapolis on August 25, 2016, but he did not perform the song there as planned. On September 5, 2016, West performed the track as a closer for the tour's Madison Square Garden show. GQ's Jake Wolf felt, "It served less as musical entertainment and more as a collective exhalation for everyone making their way towards the exit." Rapper G-Eazy and DJ Carnage moshed with a fan to the song when West performed it live on October 29, 2016, in Las Vegas on the Saint Pablo Tour. In September 2019, Chance the Rapper performed his verse at a "Sunday Service" of West's in Chicago. Chance the Rapper would also perform his verse as part of a medley on his 2020 NBA All-Star Game halftime performance.

== Commercial performance ==
"Ultralight Beam" charted in a number of countries and performed similarly to the album track "Waves" commercially. The song peaked at number 63 on the UK Singles Chart, making it the highest charting non-single from The Life of Pablo in the United Kingdom; the song remained on the chart for two weeks. As of October 24, 2019, the song ranks as West's 36th most successful track of all time on the UK Singles Chart. The song entered at number 67 on the US Billboard Hot 100 with 7.8 million streams—the highest charting non-single from the album in the United States—and spent two weeks on the chart before dropping off it. On the US Billboard Hot R&B/Hip-Hop Songs chart, "Ultralight Beam" debuted at number 22 in the same week as it debuted on the Billboard Hot 100. In its second week on the chart, the song fell 11 places to number 33. It fell a further eight places to number 41 in its third and final week on the chart. In Canada, the song debuted at number 88 on the Canadian Hot 100, where it remained for one week before dropping off the chart. Along with "Waves" and "FML", it became one of only three non-single releases from the album to chart in Canada. The song charted in Ireland, debuting at number 78 on the Ireland Singles Top 100 chart where it remained for two weeks. This made it the highest charting non-single release from The Life of Pablo in the country. Like "Waves" it was the second non-single release from the album to chart in Ireland. The following week, the song dropped to number 82 and then off the chart.

In March 2018, the song was certified Platinum in the United States by the Recording Industry Association of America (RIAA). It stands with "Waves" as one of the two non-single releases from The Life of Pablo to achieve the certification in the US. The track was certified Gold in the UK by the British Phonographic Industry (BPI) on February 7, 2025.

== Legacy ==
Post-release, the song's legacy has grown, even though West never released it as a single. On March 10, 2016, West tweeted out: "A lot of people tell me 'Ultralight Beam' is my greatest artwork to date only rival being 'Jesus Walks'." West's then-wife Kim listed the track among her 28 favorite songs by her (now) ex-husband in August 2016. When Premier Gospel looked into The Life of Pablo possibly being the gospel album of 2016. The site's Jamie Cutteridge voiced the belief that if the album's "Ultralight Beam", "Jesus Walks" or "Low Lights" had been released by anyone other than West, "we'd be hailing them as the new hero of gospel music." According to Lawrence Ware of The Root, "Ultralight Beam" has become "the official song of Christians who love Jesus but curse a little." He believes this because of the track's callback to old gospel traditions. He also cites the lyric "This is a God dream", and Kirk Franklin's appearance as enhancing the song's gospel roots. Ware felt: "[The song] took me and many other black millennials into the presence of God like few songs can. It is self-assured yet humble, genre-bending while respecting and participating in black folk traditions. If that doesn't describe the current generation of black folks, then I don't know what does." In June 2018, Complex looked back on "Ultralight Beam" as a track that "sounded exactly like what [West] promised" when he made the claim that The Life of Pablo would be a gospel album. On the track "Kids See Ghosts" by the group Kids See Ghosts, which consists of Kanye West and Kid Cudi, West drops a reference to the song with the line: "Ultralight building in the building by amateur."

=== Lawsuit ===
In February 2019, West was sued by Natalie Green's legal guardians over the sample he used to open the track The child's adoptive parents, Andrew and Shirley Green in a joint lawsuit with Andreia Green who appeared with Natalie in the sample's source video, claimed that West had sought approval from Green's biological mother, Alice Johnson, and not them. According to the Green family, Johnson was not authorized to clear the sample, as they adopted her in December 2012, nor did she receive written license or payment for the use of Natalie's voice on the song. The parents sought profits made from "Ultralight Beam" and "additional damages."

In December 2019, West and his team filed a motion for judgement, arguing that due to the sample not having been registered with the United States Copyright Office by the Green family at the time of the song's release, statutory damages or attorney fees could not be claimed by the family.

In January 2020, West's motion was denied in respect to Andrew and Shirley's claims on behalf of Natalie, who had been registered since April 2016 with the United States Copyright Office as the sole owner of the sample's source. West's motion was granted by the court in respect to Andreia Green's claims, which at the time of the lawsuit could be based only on an in-progress application to be registered as an owner of the copyright alongside Natalie. West subsequently filed a motion to reconsider which was denied. In October 2020 the case reached an undisclosed settlement out of court.

== Cover versions and usage in media ==
American indie rock band Local Natives covered the song in late 2016 as part of Spotify's "Singles" program. The band announced the cover on Twitter, saying that they "need the prayer of peace & serenity now more than ever." The band later performed the cover live as part of their June 2017 set at Primavera Sound in Barcelona. In early 2017, English hip hop artist Stormzy covered the song during an appearance on BBC Radio 1's Live Lounge, and subsequently performed the cover during his headlining set at the 2019 Glastonbury Festival. In May 2017, Harry Styles covered the song during a surprise concert in London, in celebration of the release of his self-titled debut album. Daniel Kreps of Rolling Stone said Styles stripped the song of its gospel elements, instead giving it a "moody Purple Rain makeover" that made his rendition stand out on its own.

Chance the Rapper performed a cover of the song live in June 2017 on the Be Encouraged Tour, alongside covers of West's "Waves" and "Father Stretch My Hands, Pt. 1". American artist and filmmaker Arthur Jafa used "Ultralight Beam" as the soundtrack for his 2016 seven and a half-minute video artwork Love Is The Message, The Message Is Death. Austin Gleason uploaded a cover version of the song in May 2017 to his SoundCloud. It was released for digital download as a single in November 2018. In 2019, New Zealand artist Stan Walker covered the song on his EP Faith Hope Love.

=== Sunday Service Choir version ===
"Ultralight Beam"

Song by Sunday Service Choir

from the album Jesus Is Born
- Released: December 25, 2019
- Recorded: 2019
- Genre: Gospel
- Length: 3:20
- Label: INC
- Composers: Kanye West; Nikki Grier

American gospel group Sunday Service Choir recorded a cover of the song in late 2019. Composed by West and Nikki Grier, it was released as the eighth track on their debut studio album Jesus Is Born. Prior to release, the song had been featured at Sunday Service sessions throughout 2019. The song is a gospel track that has the same meaning as the original version of "Ultralight Beam", while staying true to the chorus. Both Chance the Rapper and West's verses are replaced with flourishes from the choir's director Jason White.

==== Reception ====
The Sunday Service Choir version of "Ultralight Beam" received widespread acclaim from music critics, with many comparing it to the original version. The song was viewed by Laviea Thomas of ClashMusic as a "distinctive" rendition of the original. In The Guardian, Dean Van Nguyen listed the song among the most interesting parts of the album for West's fans and described it as "whittled down to the choir section that helped power the original." Ryan B. Patrick from Exclaim cited the song as a "new take" of the original and viewed it as one of the parts of Jesus Is Born to vibe off of. Rhian Daly of NME cited the song as one of the parts that draw fans of West into the album and looked at the song as what "stays faithful to the original" outside of Chance the Rapper's appearance. Bianca Gracie of Billboard described the song as making the original "even more captivating." Writing for AllMusic, Neil Z. Young commented that the song is a fresh take on the latter.

"Ultralight Beam" experienced a lesser reception commercially. Following the release of Jesus Is Born, the track entered at number 25 on the US Billboard Gospel Songs chart. The next week, it rose 14 places to peak at number 11 on the chart.

==== Credits and personnel ====
Credits adapted from Tidal.

- Jason White – arranger
- Phil Cornish – arranger
- Kanye West – composer
- Nikki Grier – composer

== Credits and personnel ==
Credits adapted from West's official website.

- Production – Kanye West, Mike Dean #MWA for Dean's List Productions, Chance the Rapper & Swizz Beatz
- Co-production – Rick Rubin & Derek Watkins
- Additional production – Plain Pat, DJDS & Noah Goldstein for Ark Productions, Inc
- Engineering – Noah Goldstein, Andrew Dawson, Anthony Kilhoffer, Mike Dean & Mike Malchicoff
- Mix – Manny Marroquin at Larrabee Studios, North Hollywood, CA.
- Mix assisted – assisted by Chris Galland, Ike Schultz & Jeff Jackson
- Vocals – Chance the Rapper, Kirk Franklin, The-Dream & Kelly Price
- Additional vocals – Natalie Green & Samoria Green
- Trumpets – Donnie Trumpet
- Keyboards & bass guitar – Mike Dean
- Choir contractor – Anthony Evans for Sherman James Productions
- Choir – Aaron Encinas, Shanika Bereal, Crystal Lewis Ray, Kenyon Dixon, Rachel Whitlow, George Young, Lakesha Shantell, Tiffany Stevenson & Chavonne Stewart

== Charts ==
=== Weekly charts ===
==== Original version ====
Chart performance for "Ultralight Beam"
Chart (2016)	Peak position
Canada Hot 100 (Billboard)	88
Ireland (IRMA)	78
New Zealand Heatseekers (RMNZ)	10
Sweden Heatseeker (Sverigetopplistan)	5
UK Singles (Official Charts)	63
UK Hip Hop/R&B (Official Charts)	15
US Billboard Hot 100	67
US Hot R&B/Hip-Hop Songs (Billboard)	22

==== Sunday Service Choir version ====
Chart performance for "Ultralight Beam"
Chart (2020)	Peak position
US Gospel Songs (Billboard)	11

== Certifications ==
Sales certifications for "Ultralight Beam"
Region	Certification	Certified units/sales
Denmark (IFPI Danmark)	Gold	45,000^{‡}
New Zealand (RMNZ)	Platinum	30,000^{‡}
United Kingdom (BPI)	Gold	400,000^{‡}
United States (RIAA)	2× Platinum	2,000,000^{‡}
^{‡} Sales+streaming figures based on certification alone.
