= SocialWorks =

Non-profit organization in Chicago

- Formation: 2016
- Founders: Chancelor Bennett; Justin Cunningham; Essence Smith
- Type: Non-Profit
- Purpose: Humanitarian
- Website: socialworkschi.org

SocialWorks is a non-profit organization founded in Chicago in August 2016 by artist Chancelor Bennett (also known as Chance the Rapper), Justin Cunningham, and Essence Smith. SocialWorks was founded in support of Chicago Public Schools (CPS). SocialWorks raises money for social issues that affect Chicago's youth, such as education, homelessness, mental health support, as well as to create spaces and bring visibility to Chicago's artistic community. Bennett founded SocialWorks with the intention of “giving back to his community.”

== History ==
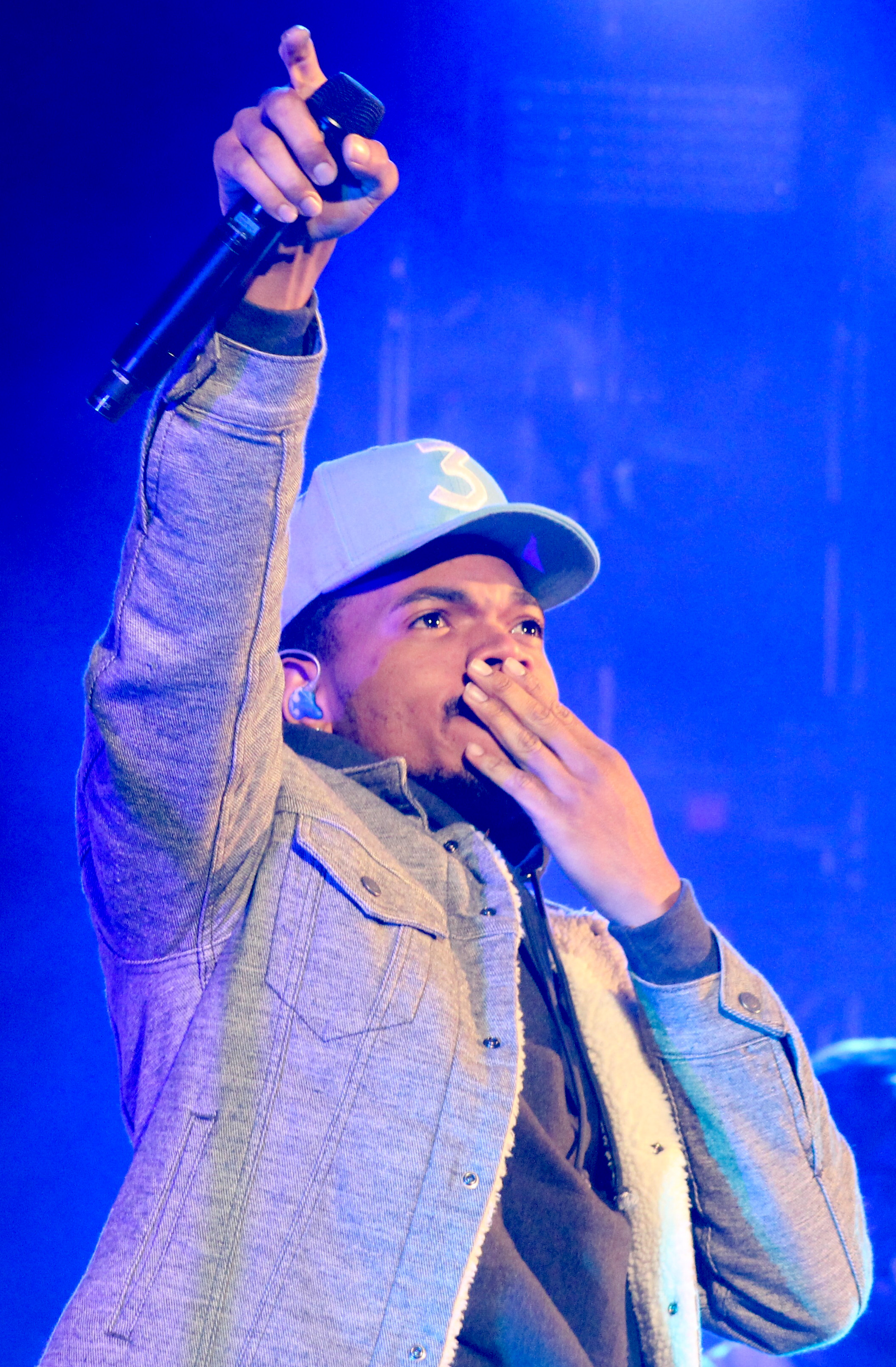
Chancelor Bennett: Founder of SocialWorks

SocialWorks became a registered public charity in August, 2016. The non-profit charity was announced September 24, 2016, at Bennett's music festival, Magnificent Coloring Day, on the South Side of Chicago. The inception of this non-profit began in 2015 with OpenMike, an event which is hosted monthly and offers a creative space for Chicago's youth to perform and to be exposed to art. In January 2015, Chance teamed up with the program Get Schooled, Get Connected in order to raise $100,000 for technological equipment for CPS. This was a precedent for SocialWorks’ Support CPS Initiative. As a result of this fundraising, SocialWorks came into formation, under the partnership of Bennett, Cunningham and their friend Essence Smith. The initial funding for the charity came from Bennett, who donated $1 million.

SocialWorks initiated the Support CPS and the New Chance: Arts and Literature Fund campaigns, which raise money for education, technological equipment, and arts programs in schools in under served areas which have experienced budget cuts.

In 2017 Google partnered with SocialWorks and awarded the program a grant of 1 million, and an additional $500,000 directly donated to CPS. Chance discussed the funding on Twitter, stating that it would fund “coding classes for 20 schools on the South and West side.”

In 2017, at an assembly at Michele Clark High School, Jewel Osco donated 1 million to the charity. The money was designated for the New Chance: Arts and Literature Fund.

== Initiatives ==
The organization operates five campaigns: Support CPS, which raises money for Chicago Public Schools, My State of Mind, which raises funds to increase accessibility to mental health services, The Warmest Winter, which operates clothing drives for the homeless, OpenMike, which supports young artists in Chicago, and Kids of the Kingdom, which provides funding for educational summer programs.

=== Support CPS ===
The Support CPS fund was launched in 2017 by Bennett and SocialWorks after budget discussions with Governor Bruce Rauner over funding for CPS reached an impasse. Bennett donated $1 million to the fund and awareness was raised for Support CPS through the hashtag #SupportCPS on social media. Following his donation individuals, businesses, and organizations such as Jewel Osco, the Chicago Bulls, Google, and STATE Bags also made donations. During that same year SocialWorks partnered with CPS and Ingenuity, an arts advocacy organization, to create the New Chance Literature and Arts Fund in order to raise money for arts programs in schools experiencing severe budget cuts.

In 2018 SocialWorks announced that $2.2 million had been raised through the New Chance Fund and that twenty CPS would be receiving donations of $100,000 to help fund their arts and literature programs. The organization also partnered with shared riding service Lyft to raise money for new arts and literature programs for CPS. Donations would be gathered by riders opting in to round up their fares and since its launch, the initiative has raised over $100,000. SocialWorks has also raised funding for CPS by partnering with UNITY to host the #SupportCPS fashion show, which featured student created designs to raise money for CPS and support local artists.

=== My State Of Mind ===
The My State of Mind initiative was introduced in September 2018 to increase awareness and visibility for mental health services in Chicago, Illinois. The initiative began with a $1 million donation from Bennett, with the intention to establish a modern resource for obtaining information about mental health services. Essence Smith further commented that a central goal of the initiative is to create a guidebook filled with "a comprehensive collection of mental health resources." The guidebook is designed to include all mental health services, both direct care and referral-based; as well as, educational services within Cook county. Through this initiative the organization plans to donate $100,000 to six mental health providers in the city.

=== The Warmest Winter ===
The Warmest Winter Initiative was first announced in December 2015 through a radio appearance Chance made at a local Chicago radio station, WGCI FM 107.5. The initiative was created through a partnership with The Empowerment Plan to help raise $100,000 U.S. dollars for winter coats through donations. These donations would be used to fund the employment of homeless people from Detroit, who would create coats that were capable of being turned into sleeping bags for homeless people in Chicago. Incentives such as tickets to games or shows were used to encourage people to donate and sponsor the cost of a coat for the initiative, which was initially only planned to run until 2016. SocialWorks took over the initiative after their creation in 2016 and has continued Warmest Winter after re-branding it to offer different services, experiences and donations. Efforts by the initiative in its current state include clothing drives and events such as the "Night at the Museum", where families bring in items to build Warmth Kits for the homeless while also participating in exhibits and activities.

=== OpenMike ===
OpenMike is a series of free monthly events hosted in Chicago, for high school students that could provide their school ID. OpenMike was officially hosted in February 2015 at the Chicago Cultural Center, as an event to honor the passing of poet Mike Hawkins, Brother Mike. It was first started between Chance the Rapper and Malcolm London but was later incorporated into SocialWorks. Because Brother Mike was a poet and mentor with Harold Washington Library's YouMedia Center, OpenMike incorporated coordinates programs that encourages teen artists to perform and connect with other artists in attendance. OpenMike also has celebrity guest performances, like Kanye West and Kendrick Lamar, and they occasionally have different partnerships that take place. In December 2017, the Air Jordan brand teamed up with SocialWorks in a one-time event. Air Jordan donated 300 pairs of unreleased Jordan 11 sneakers to teens attending OpenMike at Cindy Pritzker Auditorium.

=== Kids of the Kingdom ===
Kids of the Kingdom is a program created in 2017 by Social Works and LANDR Music to provide additional audio mastering classes after school for students in the Chicago metropolitan area. Starting in June 2017, 75 Chicago kids participated in this program through the Kids of the Kingdom Summer Music Academy. The idea behind this initiative is to provide a space for kids to be social, learn, and become civically engaged in their community. LANDR Music donated $1 for every new user of their website and 10% of its profits to SocialWorks between June 6 and June 20, 2017.

== Partnerships and Donors ==
My State of Mind partners with Two Goats, JPA, DHS, and Cook County Public Health. OpenMike partners with Chicago Public Library and the Jordan Brand. Support CPS partners with Ingenuity, Children First Fund, Google, Lyft, Jewel Osco, Conagra Brands, Sky Zone, and Champion. The Warmest Winter partners with the Field Museum, Michael Airhart, and the Museum of Science and Industry.

== Events ==
=== Black History Month Film Festival ===
The Black History Month Film Festival was launched in 2018 and runs during the month of February, offering reduced price tickets for youth to attend and familiarize themselves with films created by Black artists. The 2018 festival featured a selection of five films at Chicago's Studio Grill with showings rotating each week. In 2019 the program moved to the Showplace Icon Theater, where fifteen films were shown and patrons could attend panel discussions and Q&A post-screening interviews with film directors and special guests.

=== Parade To The Polls ===
In November 2016 SocialWorks teamed up with Chicago Votes for a get out and vote initiative. This was an effort to encourage young Chicagoans to vote. The event started with a free concert in Grant Park and ended when Chance led thousands of fans through the streets of Chicago to The Chicago Board of Elections.

=== Mahalia Jackson Elementary School: New Auditorium ===
At the end of March 2019, Bennett announced, via Instagram, Mahalia Jackson Elementary School as a new beneficiary of SocialWorks, New Chance Arts and Literature fund. The South side school was deemed needy after a prolonged lack of funding for the art programs. The grant allowed the school to finish construction of a new performing arts auditorium.
