= Magnificent Coloring World Tour =

2016 concert tour by Chance the Rapper

- Tour by Chance the Rapper
- Associated album: Coloring Book
- Start date: September 15, 2016
- End date: November 26, 2016
- Legs: 2
- No. of shows: 27 in North America; 10 in Europe; 37 total

Chance the Rapper concert chronology
- Family Matters Tour (2015); Magnificent Coloring World Tour (2016); Be Encouraged Tour (2017)

Magnificent Coloring World Tour was a headlining concert tour by American recording artist, Chance the Rapper, starting at the CalCoast Credit Union Open Air Theatre in San Diego on September 15, 2016, and ending on November 26, 2016, in Manchester, England. Francis and the Lights served as the opening act.

== Tour dates ==
Date	City	Country	Venue
North America
September 15, 2016	San Diego	United States	CalCoast Credit Union Open Air Theatre
September 17, 2016	Los Angeles	United States	Greek Theatre
September 18, 2016	Las Vegas	United States	Brooklyn Bowl
September 20, 2016	Denver	United States	Fillmore Auditorium
September 21, 2016	Kansas City	United States	Arvest Bank Theatre at The Midland
September 25, 2016	Detroit	United States	Fox Theatre
September 27, 2016	Toronto	Canada	Canada Echo Beach
September 29, 2016	Boston	United States	Leader Bank Pavilion
October 2, 2016	New York City	United States	The Meadows
October 6, 2016	Fairfax	United States	EagleBank Arena
October 7, 2016	Raleigh	United States	Red Hat Amphitheater
October 8, 2016	Atlanta	United States	Fox Theatre
October 10, 2016	Miami	United States	The Fillmore Miami Beach
October 11, 2016	Miami	United States	The Fillmore Miami Beach
October 12, 2016	Tallahassee	United States	Warchant
October 13, 2016	New Orleans	United States	Mardi Gras World Ballroom
October 15, 2016	Houston	United States	Revention Music Center
October 16, 2016	Dallas	United States	The Bomb Factory
October 21, 2016	San Francisco	United States	Bill Graham Civic Auditorium
October 22, 2016	Berkeley	United States	Hearst Greek Theatre
October 24, 2016	Seattle	United States	WaMu Theatre
October 25, 2016	Vancouver	Canada	U of British Columbia
October 26, 2016	Vancouver	Canada	U of British Columbia
October 28, 2016	Portland	United States	Veterans Memorial Coliseum
October 30, 2016	Davis	United States	UC Davis
November 11, 2016	Mesa	United States	Mesa Amphitheatre
November 13, 2016	Los Angeles	United States	Camp Flog Gnaw
Europe
November 15, 2016	Frederiksberg	Denmark	Falconersalen
November 16, 2016	Berlin	Germany	Columbiahalle
November 17, 2016	Tilburg	Netherlands	013
November 19, 2016	Manchester	England	Academy
November 20, 2016	London	England	O_{2} Academy Brixton
November 21, 2016	Paris	France	Zenith
November 22, 2016	London	England	O_{2} Academy Brixton
November 23, 2016	Dublin	Ireland	Dublin Helix
November 25, 2016	Dublin	Ireland	Dublin Helix
November 26, 2016	Manchester	England	O_{2} Apollo

== Magnificent Coloring World ==
Magnificent Coloring World is a 2021 American concert film produced by singer-songwriter Chance the Rapper. Directed by Jake Schreier, the film documents a special performance of Magnificent Coloring World, Bennett's 2016 concert tour in support of Coloring Book. Through his content production company House of Kicks, Bennett signed a trailblazing international distribution agreement with AMC Theatres for the film, marking the first time an individual recording artist has distributed a film through AMC.

Filming occurred in secret with an audience of Bennett's 1500 closest fans at Cinescape Studios in his hometown of Chicago, Illinois, but was shelved due to other projects he was working on at the time. The COVID-19 pandemic gave Bennett an opportunity to retreat to House of Kicks — his one-stop-shop office, content production house, movie set and recording studio — to spend the required time to fully complete the editing of the project alongside his team. The unconventional move to bypass studios and directly partner with theaters was the result of Bennett's vision of a "community" experience that only a movie theater could accomplish, coinciding with cinemas reopening to partial capacity.

The film premiered in Los Angeles, California, on August 13, 2021 and New York City on August 14, 2021, with a simultaneous release to select theaters worldwide on August 13. The film was also released to select Odeon Theaters in the United Kingdom, Ireland, and Canada on Friday, September 10, 2021.

== Production ==
=== Background and development ===
Bennett released Coloring Book in 2016, which was credited for modifying the music industry's view of streaming and the hip-hop landscape at a time when a physical release of a project was required to add legitimacy. The project topped multiple year-end lists, debuted in the top 10 of the Billboard 200 chart without a single “sale”, and became the first streaming-only album to win a Grammy. Bennett also embarked on an international concert tour to promote the project.

On May 21, 2016, Bennett surprised a portion of his earliest fans to a day of secret activities in celebration of the success of the project (including a giant Chance-themed carnival, choir performance, and exclusive merchandise), which concluded with a free concert at a secret hometown location, and fans’ phones were confiscated during the event to mitigate spoilers. He was inspired by the Ed Sullivan Show and American Bandstand stage shows of the Motown era, which influenced a final design centered around numerous semi-circular stages with various themes tied together with bleachers. Bennett shelved the footage as new music was imminent, and continued to produce, direct, and storyboard short-form videos of his concerts. These projects culminated in 2020 virtual Concert Film Chi-Town Christmas - his largest production to-date - being filmed at Cinescape Studios, the same soundstage as the 2016 concert footage, but without an audience as the result of the pandemic. Upon completion of the editing for Chi-Town Christmas, Bennett and his team realized that the virtual concert production would have been "a cool holiday [theater] experience”, and he suddenly remembered the Jake Schreier-directed footage from the secret 2016 concert.

== Reception ==
=== Critical response ===
Richard Roeper of Chicago Sun-Times awarded the film a three-point-five out of four-star rating, praising its "captivating" energy and "coolness". Carla Hay from Culture Mix described the film as "[no]thing groundbreaking in its production and staging, but... a lively showcase for Chance the Rapper and his charismatic showmanship."

== Legacy ==
Bennett's 2021 move to partner directly with AMC Theatres, who agreed to serve as both worldwide distributor and exhibitor, has been echoed in similar deals for several subsequent concert films, including Taylor Swift: The Eras Tour (2023), and hybrid concert-film/documentary Renaissance: A Film by Beyoncé (2023).
