= Be Encouraged Tour =

2017 concert tour by Chance the Rapper

- Tour by Chance the Rapper
- Promotional Poster for Tour
- Associated album: Coloring Book
- Start date: April 24, 2017
- End date: October 4, 2017
- Legs: 1
- No. of shows: 48 in North America; 1 in Europe; 49 total

Chance the Rapper concert chronology
- Magnificent Coloring World Tour (2016); Be Encouraged Tour (2017); The Big Day Tour (2019)

Be Encouraged Tour was a headlining concert tour by American recording artist, Chance the Rapper, in support of his third mixtape, Coloring Book (2016). The tour began in San Diego on April 24, 2017, and concluded in Los Angeles on October 22, 2017. American pop act Francis and the Lights, fellow Chicago rapper King Louie, and DJ Oreo served as opening acts.

== Background ==
Following his successful Grammy weekend, Chance took to Instagram to deliver the news with a photo of the tour dates, which spans from April through June as well as one October date. The caption in part reads, “thank YOU GUYS for everything.”

== Set list ==
This set list is representative of the show on April 24, 2017 in San Diego. It is not representative of all concerts for the duration of the tour.

1. "Angels"
2. "Blessings"
3. "Sunday Candy" (Donnie Trumpet & The Social Experiment cover)
4. "Pusha Man"
5. "Smoke Again"
6. "Cocoa Butter Kisses"
7. "Favorite Song"
8. "Everybody's Something"
9. "Waves" (Kanye West cover)
10. "Father Stretch My Hands" (Kanye West cover)
11. "Ultralight Beam"
12. "Juke Jam"
13. "Smoke Break"
14. "No Problem"
15. "Mixtape"
16. "All Night"
17. "Finish Line / Drown"
18. "Same Drugs"
19. "How Great"
20. "All We Got"
21. "Summer Friends"
22. "Paranoia"
23. "Blessings (Reprise)"

== Tour dates ==
List of concerts, showing date, city, country, venue, opening acts, tickets sold, number of available tickets and amount of gross revenue
Date	City	Country	Venue	Opening acts	Attendance	Revenue
North America
April 24, 2017	San Diego	United States	Valley View Casino Center	King Louie; DJ Oreo	—	—
April 26, 2017	Oakland	United States	Oracle Arena	King Louie; DJ Oreo	—	—
April 27, 2017	Sacramento	United States	Golden 1 Center	King Louie; DJ Oreo	12,117 / 12,117	$667,250
April 29, 2017	West Valley City	United States	Maverik Center	King Louie; DJ Oreo	8,301 / 9,977	$482,167
April 30, 2017	Nampa	United States	Ford Idaho Center	King Louie; DJ Oreo	5,123 / 8,933	$320,959
May 2, 2017	Morrison	United States	Red Rocks Amphitheatre	King Louie; DJ Oreo	—	—
May 3, 2017	Morrison	United States	Red Rocks Amphitheatre	King Louie; DJ Oreo	—	—
May 5, 2017 (Note: The concert on May 5, 2017 at Fair Park in Dallas is part of JMBLYA.)	Dallas	United States	Fair Park	—	—	—
May 6, 2017 (Note: The concert on May 6, 2017 at Circuit of the Americas in Austin is part of JMBLYA.)	Austin	United States	Circuit of the Americas	—	—	—
May 7, 2017	The Woodlands	United States	Cynthia Woods Mitchell Pavilion	King Louie; DJ Oreo	—	—
May 9, 2017	Tulsa	United States	BOK Center	King Louie; DJ Oreo	10,650 / 10,650	$574,755
May 10, 2017	Omaha	United States	CenturyLink Center Omaha	King Louie; DJ Oreo	13,217 / 13,217	$720,552
May 12, 2017	Saint Paul	United States	Xcel Energy Center	King Louie; DJ Oreo	14,012 / 14,012	$815,854
May 13, 2017	Bonner Springs	United States	Providence Medical Center Amphitheater	King Louie; DJ Oreo	17,729 / 17,729	$797,856
May 14, 2017	St. Louis	United States	Scottrade Center	King Louie; DJ Oreo	14,028 / 14,028	$757,926
May 16, 2017	Columbus	United States	Nationwide Arena	King Louie; DJ Oreo	13,161 / 13,161	$727,200
May 18, 2017	Auburn Hills	United States	The Palace of Auburn Hills	King Louie; DJ Oreo	—	—
May 19, 2017	Cuyahoga Falls	United States	Blossom Music Center	King Louie; DJ Oreo	—	—
May 20, 2017	Pittsburgh	United States	PPG Paints Arena	King Louie; DJ Oreo	12,693 / 12,693	$659,159
May 21, 2017 (Note: The concert on May 21, 2017 in Gulf Shores Beach at Gulf Shores is part of Hangout Music Festival.)	Gulf Shores	United States	Gulf Shores Beach	—	—	—
May 25, 2017	Montreal	Canada	Bell Centre	King Louie; DJ Oreo	7,522 / 9,244	$484,143
May 26, 2017 (Note: The concert on May 26, 2017 at Harvard Athletic Complex in Allston is part of Boston Calling Music Festival.)	Allston	United States	Harvard Athletic Complex	—	—	—
May 28, 2017 (Note: The concert on May 28, 2017 at The Gorge Amphitheatre in George is part of Sasquatch! Music Festival.)	George	United States	The Gorge Amphitheatre	—	—	—
May 30, 2017 (Note: The concert on May 30, 2017 at Budweiser Stage in Toronto was originally scheduled on May 24, 2017, but was rescheduled due to rising lake levels from Lake Ontario.)	Toronto	Canada	Budweiser Stage	King Louie; DJ Oreo	—	—
May 31, 2017	Darien	United States	Darien Lake Performing Arts Center	King Louie; DJ Oreo	—	—
June 2, 2017 (Note: The concert on June 2, 2017 at Randall's Island in New York City is part of Governors Ball Music Festival.)	New York City	United States	Randall's Island	—	—	—
June 3, 2017	Virginia Beach	United States	Veterans United Home Loans Amphitheater	King Louie; DJ Oreo	18,516 / 20,055	$577,326
June 4, 2017	Bristow	United States	Jiffy Lube Live	King Louie; DJ Oreo	—	—
June 6, 2017	Baltimore	United States	Royal Farms Arena	King Louie; DJ Oreo	10,924 / 11,317	$581,936
June 7, 2017	Greensboro	United States	Greensboro Coliseum	King Louie; DJ Oreo	—	—
June 8, 2017	Charlotte	United States	PNC Music Pavilion	King Louie; DJ Oreo	18,512 / 18,881	$577,623
June 10, 2017 (Note: The concert on June 10, 2017 at Great Stage Park in Manchester is part of Bonnaroo Music Festival.)	Manchester	United States	Great Stage Park	—	—	—
June 11, 2017	Atlanta	United States	Lakewood Amphitheatre	King Louie; DJ Oreo	—	—
June 13, 2017	Miami	United States	American Airlines Arena	King Louie; DJ Oreo	—	—
June 14, 2017	Tampa	United States	Amalie Arena	King Louie; DJ Oreo	—	—
June 16, 2017 (Note: The concert on June 16, 2017 at Eaux Claires Campgrounds in Eau Claire is part of Eaux Claires Festival.)	Eau Claire	United States	Eaux Claires Campgrounds	—	—	—
June 17, 2017 (Note: The concert on June 17, 2017 at The Woodlands of Dover International Speedway in Dover is part of Firefly Music Festival.)	Dover	United States	The Woodlands of Dover International Speedway	—	—	—
July 2, 2017 (Note: The concert on July 2, 2017 at Mercedes-Benz Superdome in New Orleans is part of Essence Music Festival.)	New Orleans	United States	Mercedes-Benz Superdome	—	—	—
Europe
July 7, 2017 (Note: The concert on July 7, 2017 at Finsbury Park in London is part of Wireless Festival.)	London	England	Finsbury Park	—	—	—
North America
July 21, 2017 (Note: The concert on July 21, 2017 at Xfinity Theatre in Hartford is part of Hot 93.7's HOT JAM.)	Hartford	United States	Xfinity Theatre	—	—	—
August 5, 2017 (Note: The concert on August 5, 2017 at Grant Park in Chicago is part of Lollapalooza.)	Chicago	United States	Grant Park	—	—	—
August 17, 2017 (Note: The concert on August 17, 2017 at Radio City Music Hall in New York City is part of Dave Chappelle & Chance The Rapper: Live From Radio City.)	New York City	United States	Radio City Music Hall	—	—	—
September 9, 2017 (Note: The concert on September 9, 2017 at Angel Stadium in Anaheim is part of Day N Night Festival.)	Anaheim	United States	Angel Stadium	—	—	—
September 22, 2017 (Note: The concert on September 22, 2017 at Downtown Las Vegas in Las Vegas is part of Life Is Beautiful.)	Las Vegas	United States	Downtown Las Vegas	—	—	—
September 26, 2017	New York City	United States	Forest Hills Stadium	Francis and the Lights; DJ Oreo	—	—
September 27, 2017	New York City	United States	Forest Hills Stadium	Francis and the Lights; DJ Oreo	—	—
October 3, 2017	Los Angeles	United States	Hollywood Bowl	King Louie; DJ Oreo	—	—
October 4, 2017	Los Angeles	United States	Hollywood Bowl	King Louie; DJ Oreo	—	—
Total					—	—

== Cancelled shows ==
List of cancelled concerts, showing date, city, country, venue and reason for cancellation
Date	City	Country	Venue	Reason
July 13, 2017	Pemberton	Canada	Pemberton Campgrounds	Pemberton Music Festival bankruptcy
July 22, 2017	Centre Hall	United States	Penn's Cave & Wildlife Park	Rescheduling of Karoondinha
August 8, 2017	Oslo	Norway	Middelalderparken	Scheduling conflicts
August 10, 2017	Gothenburg	Sweden	Slottsskogen	Scheduling conflicts
August 11, 2017	Copenhagen	Denmark	Refshalevej 151	Scheduling conflicts
August 16, 2017	Hasselt	Belgium	Pukkelpop Campgrounds	Scheduling conflicts
