= Empowerment Plan =

Humanitarian organization

The Empowerment Plan is an American humanitarian organization, located in Milwaukee Junction, Detroit, Michigan. The organization works to address homelessness by providing jobs to homeless women, and by manufacturing a coat that is given to homeless individuals in need.

== Background ==
The Empowerment Plan was established as a 501(c)3 nonprofit corporation in 2011, by Veronika Scott, who was a student at the College for Creative Studies in Detroit. Beginning as a school project, Scott initially designed the sleeping bag coat, called "Element S(urvival)" from the Tyvek home insulation and wool army blankets to help the homeless population of Detroit in two ways: By providing making warm, durable coats suitable for the below freezing temperatures throughout the winter months and by helping to train and employ them. As of December 2015, the organization had trained and employed 30 homeless women and made and distributed over 10,000 coats for homeless people. Production per coat costs $100.

Where else in the world, but Detroit? It's the Wild West of Creativity. If our job that we want isn't here, and isn't being offered, we make it here for ourselves. We can really drastically change our environment and the community around us, and here in Detroit, we're doing that all the time.

Veronika Scott, via TEDx Detroit

== Support ==
To get to the production phase, the Empowerment Plan relied on the apparel company Carhartt. The Empowerment Plan also receives support from numerous Detroit-based companies, including The Women's Foundation, ACME Mills, along with insulation materials donated by GM. The production studio was first located in Corktown, Detroit. One of many organizations at the non-profit Ponyride, a non-profit where space is rented to makers and entrepreneurs with a social mission for about 20% of comparable market value. It has since graduated from Ponyride and moved to a larger space in the Detroit neighborhood Milwaukee Junction in order to expand operations. According to Scott, during the creation of the project, she was told over and over that her idea would never succeed - not because the person running it had no business experience, but because the homeless women she hired would not be "capable." Says Scott, "Everyday I enjoy proving that the homeless women I hire are powerful and driven. I am so privileged to be a part of their lives." In 2015, Empowerment Plan worked with Chicago-based musician and activist Chancelor Bennett, or Chance the Rapper, on an initiative to raise money to bring the Empowerment Plan's coats to Chicago's homeless.

== Recognition ==
In 2010, Veronika Scott was invited to the UN to speak as a young woman change-maker, and in 2011 by the Clinton Global Initiative, part of the Clinton Foundation, to speak on her drive to create The Empowerment Plan. In 2012, Veronika Scott was awarded the JFK New Frontiers Award from the John F. Kennedy Library Foundation. She is the youngest person to ever have received the honor. Also in 2012, Scott spoke via the Tedx Traverse City forum as well as Tedx Detroit.
