= Musical guest =

Form of televisual appearance

A musical guest is a singer, band, or other musician who makes a brief musical appearance on a television program of a non-musical nature.

While some shows have a format that traditionally includes numerous performances by musical guests (such as Saturday Night Live), other shows include popular musicians to boost ratings for particular episodes (such as on cartoons or sitcoms) or to help new artists gain exposure (such as The Tonight Show or The Late Show).

While many shows employ their own live band, this regular band is not considered a musical "guest". Additionally, if the theme of a program revolves completely around live music (such as American Idol or Star Search), the musicians who appear are generally not considered musical guests, as they are either contestants or are performing a different, non-musical function (such as judging the competition).

Depending on the format of the show, musical guests may simply perform a song and leave the stage, while other shows include interviews with the musicians following their performance. On Saturday Night Live, some musical guests have participated in comedy sketches with the stars of the show.

== Partial list of programs with musical guests ==
- All That
- The Dick Cavett Show
- The Ed Sullivan Show
- The Tonight Show
- Late Show with David Letterman
- The Late Late Show
- Late Night with Conan O'Brien
- Last Call with Carson Daly
- Saturday Night Live
- Mad TV
- Scooby-Doo
- The Simpsons
- Gilmore Girls
- Beverly Hills, 90210
- Chappelle's Show
- Jimmy Kimmel Live!
- The Rosie O'Donnell Show
- The Arsenio Hall Show
